= Tennis at the 1908 Summer Olympics – Men's outdoor doubles =

Tennis at the Olympics

Men's doubles tennis at the Games of the IV Olympiad
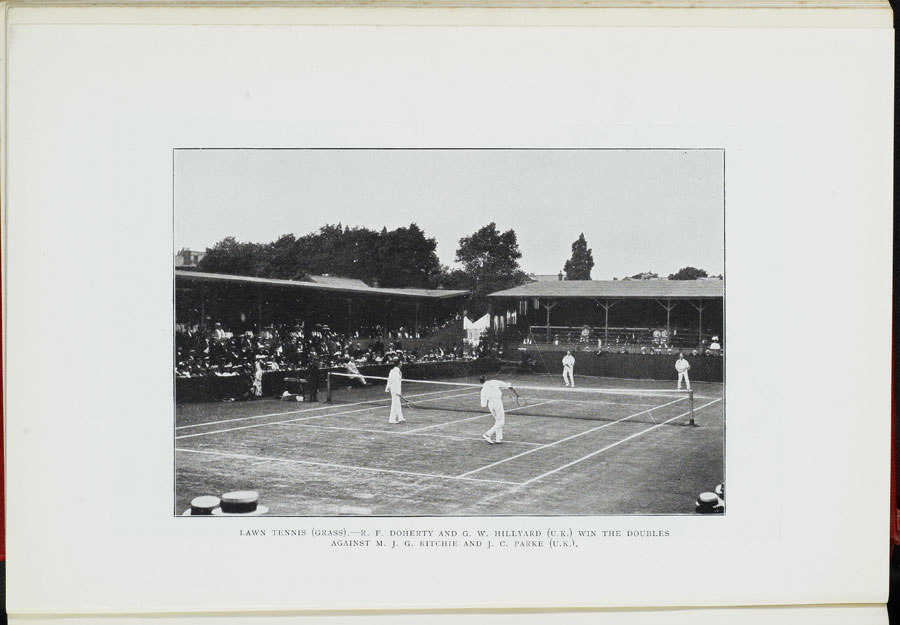
- The final between Doherty/Gillyard and Ritchie/Parke
- Venue: All England Lawn Tennis and Croquet Club
- Dates: 6 July 1908 (round 1); 7 July 1908 (round 2); 9 July 1908 (quarterfinals); 10 July 1908 (semifinal); 11 July 1908 (final)
- Competitors: 12 teams from 8 nations

Medalists
1st place, gold medalist(s)		Reginald Doherty; George Hillyard; Great Britain
2nd place, silver medalist(s)		James Cecil Parke; Major Ritchie; Great Britain
3rd place, bronze medalist(s)		Clement Cazalet; Charles P. Dixon; Great Britain

Men's outdoor doubles
- Tennis at the 1908 Summer Olympics

Events
Outdoor
Singles	men	women
Doubles	men
Indoor
Singles	men	women
Doubles	men
- Summer Olympics

The men's outdoor doubles' was one of six lawn tennis events on the Tennis at the 1908 Summer Olympics programme. Nations could enter up to 6 pairs (12 players). The event was plagued by withdrawals, with only 12 teams competing of the 21 that entered. There were 24 players from 8 nations. The event was won by Reginald Doherty and George Hillyard after defeating James Cecil Parke and Major Ritchie in the final. Clement Cazalet and Charles P. Dixon took the bronze medal without a bronze-medal match due to the withdrawal of an entire quadrant of the bracket. All three medal pairs were British. It was the second medal sweep in the men's doubles, after the United States did it in 1904, and it was also the last time that the men's doubles gold medal match was contested by pairs representing the same nation until Tokyo 2021. Doherty became the first man to win multiple men's doubles medals and gold medals, having earned gold with his brother Laurence Doherty in 1900.

== Background ==
This was the fourth appearance of the men's doubles tennis. The event has been held at every Summer Olympics where tennis has been on the program: from 1896 to 1924 and then from 1988 to the current program. A demonstration event was held in 1968. In 1908, for the first time of two, an indoor version was held concurrently. Teams of mixed nationality, which had been permitted in previous Games, were no longer allowed.

The British brothers Laurence Doherty and Reginald Doherty had been dominant for the late 1890s and early 1900s, winning the 1900 Olympic championship and eight consecutive Wimbledon titles. Laurence retired in 1906, however, leaving Reginald to search for other partners. He played with George Hillyard, an accomplished player past his prime, for the 1908 Olympic tournament. Arthur Gore and Herbert Roper Barrett, who had won the indoor doubles event, were among the most notable late scratches.

Austria, Bohemia, Canada, Hungary, the Netherlands, and South Africa each made their debut in the event. Germany and Great Britain each made their third appearance in the event, tied for most among nations.

== Competition format ==
The competition was a single-elimination tournament. A bronze-medal match was expected, but not played due to withdrawals. All matches were best-of-five sets. Tiebreaks had not been invented yet.

== Schedule ==
The Olympics started three days after the end of the 1908 Wimbledon Championships, a scheduling issue which the Official Report recommended avoiding in the future.

Date	Time	Round
Monday, 6 July 1908		Round of 32
Tuesday, 7 July 1908		Round of 16
Thursday, 9 July 1908		Quarterfinals
Friday, 10 July 1908		Semifinals
Saturday, 11 July 1908		Final

== Draw ==
Key

- Q = Qualifier
- WC = Wild card
- LL = Lucky loser
- Alt = Alternate
- ITF = ITF entry
- PR = Protected ranking
- SR = Special ranking
- SE = Special exempt
- JE = Junior exempt
- JR = Junior Accelerator Programme entrant
- CO = College Accelerator Programme entrant
- NG = Next Gen Accelerator Program entrant
- w/o = Walkover
- r = Retired
- d = Defaulted

=== Finals ===
Semifinals
Reginald Doherty (GBR); George Hillyard (GBR)	5	2	6	17	6
Clement Cazalet (GBR); Charles Dixon (GBR)	7	6	4	15	4
Major Ritchie (GBR); James Cecil Parke (GBR)	w/o
Max Decugis (FRA); Maurice Germot (FRA)

Final (gold-medal match)
Reginald Doherty (GBR); George Hillyard (GBR)	9	7	9
Major Ritchie (GBR); James Cecil Parke (GBR)	7	5	7

=== Top half ===
First round
C Cazalet (GBR); C Dixon (GBR)
R Kinzl (AUT); K von Wessely (AUT)	w/o
O Froitzheim (GER); H Schomburgk (GER)	6	6	6
O Kreuzer (GER); F Rahe (GER)	1	3	3
V Gauntlett (RSA); H Kitson (RSA)	6	6	6
B Hykš (BOH); D Slíva (BOH)	0	4	3

Second round
W Crawley (GBR); K Powell (GBR)	7	6	6
J Foulkes (CAN); R Powell (CAN)	5	3	2
R Doherty (GBR); G Hillyard (GBR)
V Károly (BOH); J Žemla (BOH)	w/o
C van Lennep (NED); R van Lennep (NED)	4	0	6	2
C Cazalet (GBR); C Dixon (GBR)	6	6	3	6
O Froitzheim (GER); H Schomburgk (GER)	6	2	5	3
V Gauntlett (RSA); H Kitson (RSA)	3	6	7	3

Quarterfinals
W Crawley (GBR); K Powell (GBR)	8	1	9	5
R Doherty (GBR); G Hillyard (GBR)	10	6	7	7
C Cazalet (GBR); C Dixon (GBR)	6	5	2	6	6
V Gauntlett (RSA); H Kitson (RSA)	2	7	6	3	3

Semifinals
R Doherty (GBR); G Hillyard (GBR)	5	2	6	17	6
C Cazalet (GBR); C Dixon (GBR)	7	6	4	15	4

=== Bottom half ===
First round
L Ivánka (HUN); D Lauber (HUN)
HR Barrett (GBR); Arthur Gore (GBR)	w/o
F Pipes (AUT); A Zborzil (AUT)
J Mičovský (BOH); J Rössler-Ořovský (BOH)	w/o

Second round
L Ivánka (HUN); D Lauber (HUN)	w/o
F Pipes (AUT); A Zborzil (AUT)
M Ritchie (GBR); JC Parke (GBR)	6	6	6
E Tóth (HUN); J Zsigmondy (HUN)	1	0	3
C Brown (CAN); H Suckling (CAN)
L Žemla (BOH); Z Žemla (BOH)	w/o
M Decugis (FRA); M Germot (FRA)
G Ball-Greene (GBR); W Eaves (GBR)	w/o

Quarterfinals
F Pipes (AUT); A Zborzil (AUT)	5	4	2
M Ritchie (GBR); JC Parke (GBR)	7	6	6
C Brown (CAN); H Suckling (CAN)	w/o
M Decugis (FRA); M Germot (FRA)

Semifinals
M Ritchie (GBR); JC Parke (GBR)
M Decugis (FRA); M Germot (FRA)	w/o
