= 1908 Wimbledon Championships – Men's singles =

Men's singles
- 1908 Wimbledon Championships

Final
- Champion: (United Kingdom) Arthur Gore
- Runner-up: (United Kingdom) Herbert Roper Barrett
- Score: 6–3, 6–2, 4–6, 3–6, 6–4

Details
- Draw: 69
- Seeds: –

Events
Singles	men	women
Doubles	men	women
- Wimbledon Championships

Arthur Gore defeated Herbert Roper Barrett 6–3, 6–2, 4–6, 3–6, 6–4 in the All-Comers final to win the gentlemen's singles tennis title at the 1908 Wimbledon Championships. The reigning champion Norman Brookes did not defend his title.

== Draw ==
Key

- Q = Qualifier
- WC = Wild card
- LL = Lucky loser
- Alt = Alternate
- ITF = ITF entry
- PR = Protected ranking
- SR = Special ranking
- SE = Special exempt
- JE = Junior exempt
- JR = Junior Accelerator Programme entrant
- CO = College Accelerator Programme entrant
- NG = Next Gen Accelerator Program entrant
- w/o = Walkover
- r = Retired
- d = Defaulted

=== All comers' finals ===
Quarterfinals
(Belgium) William le Maire de Warzée	4	6	4
(Canada) Robert Powell	6	8	6
(United Kingdom) Charles Dixon	8	3	6	0
(United Kingdom) Arthur Gore	10	6	3	6
(United Kingdom) Walter Crawley	1	3	2
(United Kingdom) Major Ritchie	6	6	6
(New Zealand) Anthony Wilding	6	4	4	0
(United Kingdom) Herbert Roper Barrett	2	6	6	6

Semifinals
(Canada) Robert Powell	8	4	2
(United Kingdom) Arthur Gore	10	6	6
(United Kingdom) Major Ritchie	3	1	6	1
(United Kingdom) Herbert Roper Barrett	6	6	3	6

Final
(United Kingdom) Arthur Gore	6	6	4	3	6
(United Kingdom) Herbert Roper Barrett	3	2	6	6	4

=== Top half ===
==== Section 1 ====
First round

Second round
(United Kingdom) CS Gordon-Smith	6	6	6
(France) Pierre Verdé-Delisle	1	4	3
(United States) Wylie Grant	6	8	7	6
(United Kingdom) JB Ward	3	10	5	3
(United Kingdom) Frank Pearce
(United Kingdom) George Simond	w/o
(Belgium) William le Maire de Warzée	6	2	6	9
(South Africa) Harold Kitson	1	6	2	7

Third round
(United Kingdom) CS Gordon-Smith	6	3	5	2
(United States) Wylie Grant	4	6	7	6
(United Kingdom) F Pearce	3	3	2
(Belgium) W le Maire de Warzée	6	6	6

Fourth round
(United States) Wylie Grant	6	6	4	2	2
(Belgium) W le Maire de Warzée	3	4	6	6	6

==== Section 2 ====
First round

Second round
(Germany) Friedrich Rahe
(United Kingdom) Stanley Franklin	w/o
(United Kingdom) George Ball-Greene	6	6	3	6
(United Kingdom) RH Hotham	3	2	6	0
(Canada) Robert Powell	6	6	6
(France) Élie de Lastours	0	2	2
(United Kingdom) Charles Tuckey	7	4	7	4	6
(United Kingdom) Alfred Taylor	5	6	5	6	3

Third round
(Germany) F Rahe	2	7	1
(United Kingdom) G Ball-Greene	6	9	6
(Canada) R Powell	6	6	6
(United Kingdom) C Tuckey	1	2	2

Fourth round
(United Kingdom) G Ball-Greene	3	6	0^{r}
(Canada) R Powell	6	8	0

==== Section 3 ====
First round

Second round
(United Kingdom) Charles Dixon	6	6	6
(United Kingdom) Fritz Goldberg	4	4	1
(United Kingdom) Charles Ridding	6	6	6
(United Kingdom) Valentine Miley	3	3	2
(United Kingdom) George Caridia	6	6	6
(United Kingdom) WP Haviland	1	2	2
(Canada) JF Foulkes	6	4	7	6
(United Kingdom) AW Andrews	3	6	5	0

Third round
(United Kingdom) C Dixon	6	6	6
(United Kingdom) C Ridding	3	2	3
(United Kingdom) C Caridia	6	6	6
(Canada) JF Foulkes	1	2	1

Fourth round
(United Kingdom) C Dixon	1	6	6	6
(United Kingdom) G Caridia	6	3	3	3

==== Section 4 ====
First round
(United Kingdom) Percival Davson	6	10	6
(Germany) Moritz von Bissing	4	8	3
(United Kingdom) Roderick McNair	6	6	6
(United Kingdom) Ernest Wills	3	1	1
(United Kingdom) FN Warden	6	3	6	3	6
(United Kingdom) Clement Cazalet	4	6	4	6	4

Second round
(South Africa) John Richardson	6	6	1	2	6
(United Kingdom) EW Timmis	4	3	6	6	4
(United Kingdom) Arthur Gore	6	6	7
(United Kingdom) Lionel Escombe	2	1	5
(United Kingdom) Kenneth Powell	7	6	6
(United Kingdom) P Davson	5	4	1
(United Kingdom) R McNair	6	6	7
(United Kingdom) FN Warden	3	3	5

Third round
(South Africa) J Richardson	2	4	0
(United Kingdom) A Gore	6	6	6
(United Kingdom) K Powell	6	7	6
(United Kingdom) R McNair	1	5	4

Fourth round
(United Kingdom) A Gore	6	9	7
(United Kingdom) K Powell	2	7	5

=== Bottom half ===
==== Section 5 ====
First round
(United Kingdom) Henry Pollard
(Germany) Otto Froitzheim	w/o
(United Kingdom) AR Sawyer	2	6	7	6	6
(United Kingdom) FH Bryant	6	2	9	4	3
(United Kingdom) Henry Wilson-Fox	11	6	6
(India) Sirdar Nihal Singh	9	2	4

Second round
(United Kingdom) H Pollard	6	7	6
(United Kingdom) AR Sawyer	0	5	1
(United Kingdom) H Wilson-Fox	0	2	0
(United Kingdom) Walter Crawley	6	6	6
(United Kingdom) Albert Prebble	6	6	6	0	6
(United Kingdom) Peter Hicks	3	8	3	6	1
(United Kingdom) George Thomas	6	6	4	6
(United Kingdom) John Flavelle	2	0	6	3

Third round
(United Kingdom) H Pollard	6	4	1	1
(United Kingdom) W Crawley	1	6	6	6
(United Kingdom) A Prebble	w/o
(United Kingdom) G Thomas

Fourth round
(United Kingdom) W Crawley	6	6	6
(United Kingdom) G Thomas	1	4	1

==== Section 6 ====
First round

Second round
(United Kingdom) Major Ritchie	6	1	6	6
(South Africa) Victor Gauntlett	3	6	2	4
(United Kingdom) Blackwood Price	6	3	7	6
(United Kingdom) Sydney Watts	1	6	5	4
(United Kingdom) TD Stoward	6	2	5	6	6
(United Kingdom) Douglas Kitching	2	6	7	4	0
(United Kingdom) Wilberforce Eaves	6	6	6
(United Kingdom) E Yatman	1	1	3

Third round
(United Kingdom) M Ritchie	6	6	6
(United Kingdom) B Price	2	0	2
(United Kingdom) TD Stoward	1	2	6
(United Kingdom) W Eaves	6	6	8

Fourth round
(United Kingdom) M Ritchie	7	6	3
(United Kingdom) W Eaves	5	3	1^{r}

==== Section 7 ====
First round

Second round
(United Kingdom) Theodore Mavrogordato	6	6	6
(United Kingdom) Charles Pritchett	1	2	2
(New Zealand) Anthony Wilding	3	6	6	7
(Germany) Oscar Kreuzer	6	0	2	5
(United Kingdom) E Morris Hall	6	6	5	6
(United Kingdom) Dunstan Rhodes	3	3	7	3
(United Kingdom) Frank Pearson	9	6	3	6	6
(United Kingdom) Alfred Beamish	11	1	6	4	3

Third round
(United Kingdom) T Mavrogordato	0	3	3
(New Zealand) A Wilding	6	6	6
(United Kingdom) E Morris Hall	1	4	2
(United Kingdom) F Pearson	6	6	6

Fourth round
(New Zealand) A Wilding	6	6	6
(United Kingdom) F Pearson	1	1	1

==== Section 8 ====
First round

Second round
(France) Maurice Germot
(United Kingdom) Gordon Lowe	w/o
(United Kingdom) Arthur Lowe	6	4	4	8	6
(United Kingdom) WG Milburn	2	6	6	6	1
(United Kingdom) WS Andrews	3	2	4
(United Kingdom) Herbert Roper Barrett	6	6	6
(United Kingdom) Otway Toler
(United Kingdom) AN Other	w/o

Third round
(France) M Germot	w/o
(United Kingdom) A Lowe
(United Kingdom) HR Barrett	6	6	6
(United Kingdom) O Toler	0	0	1

Fourth round
(United Kingdom) A Lowe	7	1	3
(United Kingdom) HR Barrett	9	6	6

Preceded by 1907 Australasian Championships – Men's singles	Grand Slam men's singles	Succeeded by 1908 U.S. National Championships – Men's singles
