= 1913 Wimbledon Championships – Men's singles =

Men's singles
- 1913 Wimbledon Championships

Final
- Champion: (New Zealand) Anthony Wilding
- Runner-up: (United States) Maurice McLoughlin
- Score: 8–6, 6–3, 10–8

Details
- Draw: 116
- Seeds: –

Events
Singles	men	women		boys	girls
Doubles	men	women	mixed	boys	girls
- Wimbledon Championships

Maurice McLoughlin defeated Stanley Doust 6–3, 6–4, 7–5 in the All Comers' Final, but the reigning champion Anthony Wilding defeated McLoughlin 8–6, 6–3, 10–8 in the challenge round to win the gentlemen's singles tennis title at the 1913 Wimbledon Championships.

== Draw ==
Key

- Q = Qualifier
- WC = Wild card
- LL = Lucky loser
- Alt = Alternate
- ITF = ITF entry
- PR = Protected ranking
- SR = Special ranking
- SE = Special exempt
- JE = Junior exempt
- JR = Junior Accelerator Programme entrant
- CO = College Accelerator Programme entrant
- NG = Next Gen Accelerator Program entrant
- w/o = Walkover
- r = Retired
- d = Defaulted

=== Challenge round ===
Challenge Round
(United States) Maurice McLoughlin	6	3	8
(New Zealand) Anthony Wilding	8	6	10

=== All-Comers' Finals ===
Quarterfinals
(United Kingdom) Alfred Ingram	1	2	4
(United States) Maurice McLoughlin	6	6	6
(United Kingdom) Douglas Watson	4	1	4
(United Kingdom) James Cecil Parke	6	6	6
(Germany) Oscar Kreuzer	6	6	5	6
(United Kingdom) Kenneth Powell	4	1	7	0
(Australia) Stanley Doust	7	6	3	11
(United Kingdom) Hope Crisp	5	3	6	9

Semifinals
(United States) Maurice McLoughlin	6	7	6
(United Kingdom) James Cecil Parke	4	5	4
(Germany) Oscar Kreuzer	3	2	3
(Australia) Stanley Doust	6	6	6

Final
(United States) Maurice McLoughlin	6	6	7
(Australia) Stanley Doust	3	4	5

=== Top half ===
==== Section 1 ====
First round
(United Kingdom) FF Roe	6	6	6
(United States) Harry Guggenheim	3	1	0
(United Kingdom) Alfred Ingram	4	6	6	6
(United Kingdom) B Wood-Hill	6	1	2	1

Second round
(United States) Craig Biddle	7	6	6
(Canada) Henry Mayes	5	4	3
(United Kingdom) Frank Jarvis	6	6	6
(United Kingdom) Alfred Hunter	4	2	2
(New Zealand) Frank Wilding	6	6	7
(United Kingdom) Scotter Owen	1	1	5
(United Kingdom) FF Roe	4	9	4	6	6
(United Kingdom) A Ingram	6	7	6	2	8

Third round
(United States) C Biddle	6	6	7
(United Kingdom) F Jarvis	1	3	5
(New Zealand) F Wilding	0	3	4
(United Kingdom) A Ingram	6	6	6

Fourth round
(United States) C Biddle	3	2	6	1
(United Kingdom) A Ingram	6	6	1	6

==== Section 2 ====
First round
(United Kingdom) AH Glendinning	6	6	6	6
(United Kingdom) AJ Jiminez	2	3	8	2
(United States) Maurice McLoughlin	4	8	1	6	8
(United Kingdom) Herbert Roper Barrett	6	6	6	2	6
(United Kingdom) Theodore Mavrogordato	6	6	6
(Germany) Heinrich Kleinschroth	4	2	1
(United Kingdom) Alfred Crawley	6	7	6
(Australia) Edmund Herring	4	5	2
(United States) R. Norris Williams
(United Kingdom) Percy Tabbush	w/o
(United Kingdom) Richard Turnbull	6	6	2	6
(United Kingdom) SF Thol	4	4	6	1
(United Kingdom) H Nickerson	3	7	7	3	6
(United Kingdom) CA Patterson	6	5	5	6	3
(South Africa) RF Le Sueur	4	6	6	8
(United Kingdom) Amphlett Davis	6	2	3	6

Second round
(United Kingdom) AH Glendinning	2	0	3
(United States) M McLoughlin	6	6	6
(United Kingdom) T Mavrogordato	6	6	6
(United Kingdom) A Crawley	2	0	4
(United States) RN Williams	6	6	6
(United Kingdom) R Turnbull	1	4	3
(United Kingdom) H Nickerson	0	4	3
(South Africa) RF Le Sueur	6	6	6

Third round
(United States) M McLoughlin	6	6	6
(United Kingdom) T Mavrogordato	4	3	2
(United States) RN Williams	8	8	7
(South Africa) RF Le Sueur	6	6	5

Fourth round
(United States) M McLoughlin	6	6	3	0
(United States) RN Williams	4	4	6	0^{r}

==== Section 3 ====
First round
(United Kingdom) Douglas Watson	6	6	4	6
(United Kingdom) Mark Hick	4	1	6	1
(Germany) G Zinn	6	6	9
(Italy) Johann de Morpurgo	4	2	7
(United Kingdom) Fritz Goldberg	6	6	6
(United Kingdom) EA Ess	3	4	2
(United Kingdom) WH Warman
(France) Maurice Germot	w/o
(United Kingdom) George Caridia	6	6	6
(United Kingdom) George Boustead	3	3	4
(United Kingdom) WG Milburn	6	7	6
(United Kingdom) SH Cole	1	5	3
(United Kingdom) Henry Webb	6	5	9	7
(United Kingdom) JD Fuller	3	7	7	5
(United States) Wallace Johnson	6	6	6
(United Kingdom) AW Andrews	1	0	3

Second round
(United Kingdom) D Watson	6	6	6
(Germany) G Zinn	2	1	2
(United Kingdom) F Goldberg	12	6	6
(United Kingdom) WH Warman	10	0	3
(United Kingdom) G Caridia	6	3	7	8
(United Kingdom) WG Milburn	2	6	5	6
(United Kingdom) H Webb	2	1	5
(United States) W Johnson	6	6	7

Third round
(United Kingdom) D Watson	6	6	8
(United Kingdom) F Goldberg	3	3	6
(United Kingdom) G Caridia	w/o
(United States) W Johnson

Fourth round
(United Kingdom) D Watson	2	8	6	7
(United States) W Johnson	6	6	1	5

==== Section 4 ====
First round
(United Kingdom) J Robinson	3	6	6	7
(United Kingdom) LS Hunter	6	2	2	5
(United Kingdom) George Cartwright	6	7	7
(United Kingdom) FR Price	4	5	5
(United Kingdom) Arthur Lowe	6	6	6
(United Kingdom) George Thomas	4	0	3
(United Kingdom) Gordon Lowe	6	6	6
(United Kingdom) HB Bland	0	0	0
(United Kingdom) Sam O'Donnell
(United Kingdom) Stanley Franklin	w/o
(United Kingdom) James Cecil Parke
(United Kingdom) RD Nolan	w/o
(Australia) Horace Rice	6	6	8
(United Kingdom) Noel Turnbull	3	4	6
(United Kingdom) Alfred Beamish	6	6	6
(United Kingdom) LE Milburn	2	2	1

Second round
(United Kingdom) J Robinson	6	6	6
(United Kingdom) G Cartwright	4	4	4
(United Kingdom) A Lowe
(United Kingdom) G Lowe	w/o
(United Kingdom) S O'Donnell	1	4	4
(United Kingdom) JC Parke	6	6	6
(Australia) H Rice	4	1	4
(United Kingdom) A Beamish	6	6	6

Third round
(United Kingdom) J Robinson	3	1	2
(United Kingdom) A Lowe	6	6	6
(United Kingdom) JC Parke	6	4	6	6
(United Kingdom) A Beamish	2	6	3	3

Fourth round
(United Kingdom) A Lowe	5	0	5
(United Kingdom) JC Parke	7	6	7

=== Bottom half ===
==== Section 5 ====
First round
(Australia) Ernest Hicks	5	6	2	6	10
(United Kingdom) FN Thorne	7	1	6	3	8
(South Africa) CR Leach	4	7	11	0
(Belgium) Paul de Borman	6	5	9	0^{r}
(United Kingdom) GTC Watt
(United Kingdom) RWF Harding	w/o
(Germany) Oscar Kreuzer	6	5	6	6
(United Kingdom) Charles Simond	4	7	2	1
(Canada) Bernie Schwengers	6	6	2	4	8
(United Kingdom) CS Grace	3	2	6	6	6
(United Kingdom) Roderick McNair	6	6	6
(United Kingdom) LS Lee	1	0	1
(United Kingdom) Arthur Gore	7	6	6
(United Kingdom) Sydney Watts	5	4	2
(United Kingdom) Cecil Tindell-Green
(United States) Samuel Hardy	w/o

Second round
(Australia) E Hicks	6	4	5	6	1
(South Africa) CR Leach	3	6	7	4	6
(United Kingdom) GTC Watt	2	2	3
(Germany) O Kreuzer	6	6	6
(Canada) B Schwengers	4	7	6	6
(United Kingdom) R McNair	6	5	1	2
(United Kingdom) A Gore	2	7	6	6	6
(United Kingdom) C Tindell-Green	6	9	3	2	3

Third round
(South Africa) CR Leach	w/o
(Germany) O Kreuzer
(Canada) B Schwengers	1	3	6	9
(United Kingdom) A Gore	6	6	4	11

Fourth round
(Germany) O Kreuzer	3	7	6	6
(United Kingdom) A Gore	6	5	2	0

==== Section 6 ====
First round
(United Kingdom) F Good	6	4	10	3	6
(United Kingdom) HJ Gilbert	3	6	8	6	1
(United Kingdom) George Stoddart	6	6	6
(United Kingdom) EW Timmis	2	3	3
(United Kingdom) Neville Willford	5	6	6	0
(Australia) Alfred Jones	7	4	2	0^{r}
(United Kingdom) Charles Dixon	6	6	6
(United Kingdom) JE Boyd	2	0	3
(South Africa) Victor Gauntlett	6	6	6
(United Kingdom) A. Wallis Myers	2	0	0
(Austria) Ludwig von Salm-Hoogstraeten
(Australia) EL Jones	w/o
(United Kingdom) Reginald Gamble	6	6	6
(Germany) F. Karl	2	1	4
(United Kingdom) Kenneth Powell	7	7	6
(United Kingdom) Peter Hicks	5	5	4

Second round
(United Kingdom) F Good	6	6	1	5	2
(United Kingdom) G Stoddart	3	2	6	7	6
(United Kingdom) N Willford	0	4	4
(United Kingdom) C Dixon	6	6	6
(South Africa) V Gauntlett	3	6	6	6
(Austria) L von Salm-Hoogstraeten	6	4	3	3
(United Kingdom) R Gamble	1	1	2
(United Kingdom) K Powell	6	6	6

Third round
(United Kingdom) G Stoddart	2	2	4
(United Kingdom) C Dixon	6	6	6
(South Africa) V Gauntlett	6	1	3	5
(United Kingdom) K Powell	4	6	6	7

Fourth round
(United Kingdom) C Dixon	3	6	6	3	9
(United Kingdom) K Powell	6	3	3	6	11

==== Section 7 ====
First round
(United Kingdom) EC Williams
(Canada) JF Foulkes	w/o
(United Kingdom) DM Field	6	6	5	6
(United Kingdom) Henry Wilson-Fox	4	3	7	1
(United Kingdom) MRL White
(France) Max Decugis	w/o
(Denmark) Erik Larsen	6	6	6
(United Kingdom) Augustus Hendriks	0	2	1
(United Kingdom) Percival Davson	6	5	6	6
(United Kingdom) A Traill	0	7	0	1
(United Kingdom) James Zimmermann	5	6	6	6
(United Kingdom) NSB Kidson	7	4	1	2
(Australia) Stanley Doust	6	6	6
(United Kingdom) CJ Adams	1	2	0
(United Kingdom) RH Hotham	12	6	9	6
(Switzerland) Armand Simon	14	2	7	2

Second round
(United Kingdom) EC Williams	3	2	6	3
(United Kingdom) DM Field	6	6	4	6
(United Kingdom) MRL White	3	3	3
(Denmark) E Larsen	6	6	6
(United Kingdom) P Davson	7	6	7
(United Kingdom) J Zimmermann	5	4	5
(Australia) S Doust	6	6	6
(United Kingdom) RH Hotham	0	1	2

Third round
(United Kingdom) DM Field	6	2	4	2
(Denmark) E Larsen	4	6	6	6
(United Kingdom) P Davson	2	4	6	6	8
(Australia) S Doust	6	6	1	1	10

Fourth round
(Denmark) E Larsen	6	6	1	0	4
(Australia) S Doust	4	2	6	6	6

==== Section 8 ====
First round
(United Kingdom) Walter Crawley
(France) Georges Gault	w/o
(Germany) Friedrich Rahe	6	6	6
(United Kingdom) Vernon Kirk	0	0	4

Second round
(United Kingdom) W Crawley	10	0	6	9
(Germany) F Rahe	8	6	4	7
(United Kingdom) JB Ward	5	7	6	1
(Canada) Robert Powell	7	9	3	6
(United Kingdom) Hope Crisp	6	6	6
(United Kingdom) BS Foster	4	2	0
(United Kingdom) John Flavelle	5	6	6	6
(United Kingdom) Cyril Eltringham	7	4	3	0

Third round
(United Kingdom) W Crawley	2	4	2
(Canada) R Powell	6	6	6
(United Kingdom) H Crisp	6	6	6
(United Kingdom) J Flavelle	2	2	1

Fourth round
(Canada) R Powell	4	5	3
(United Kingdom) H Crisp	6	7	6

Preceded by 1912 Australasian Championships – Men's singles	Grand Slam men's singles	Succeeded by 1913 U.S. National Championships – Men's singles
