= Tennis at the 1908 Summer Olympics – Men's outdoor singles =

Tennis at the Olympics

Men's outdoor singles tennis at the Games of the IV Olympiad
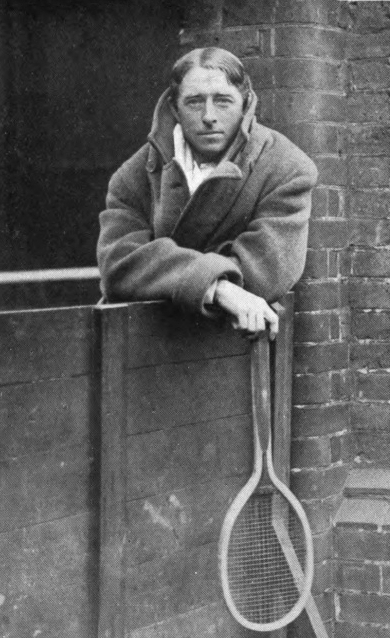
- Major Ritchie
- Venue: All England Lawn Tennis and Croquet Club
- Dates: 6 July (rounds 1–3); 7 July (rounds 2 and 3); 8 July (round 3); 9 July (quarterfinals); 10 July (semifinal); 11 July (semifinal, final)
- Competitors: 31 from 9 nations

Medalists
| 1st place, gold medalist(s) | | Major Ritchie; Great Britain |
| 2nd place, silver medalist(s) | | Otto Froitzheim; Germany |
| 3rd place, bronze medalist(s) | | Wilberforce Eaves; Great Britain |

Men's outdoor singles
- Tennis at the 1908 Summer Olympics

Events
Outdoor
| Singles | men | women |
| Doubles | men |
Indoor
| Singles | men | women |
| Doubles | men |
| ← 1904 · | Summer Olympics | · 1912 → |

The men's (outdoor) singles was one of six lawn tennis events on the Tennis at the 1908 Summer Olympics programme. The tournament was played on grass courts at the All England Lawn Tennis and Croquet Club. There were 31 competitors from 9 nations. Nations could enter up to 12 players. The event was won by Major Ritchie of Great Britain, the nation's third victory in four Games. Otto Froitzheim earned Germany's first medal in the event with his silver. Another Briton, Wilberforce Eaves, took bronze.

== Background ==
This was the fourth appearance of the men's singles tennis. The event has been held at every Summer Olympics where tennis has been on the program: from 1896 to 1924 and then from 1988 to the current program. Demonstration events were held in 1968 and 1984. In 1908, for the first time of two, an indoor version was held concurrently.

The top players did not compete in this event. Arthur Gore played only in the indoor event. William Larned, Norman Brookes, Anthony Wilding, and Laurence Doherty were noted absences. Major Ritchie was a solid player, having gone deep into Wimbledon multiple times but never having won in singles (he took doubles titles in 1908 and 1910 with Wilding).

Austria, Bohemia, Canada, the Netherlands, and South Africa each made their debut in the event. France, Germany, and Great Britain each made their third appearance, tied for most among all nations.

== Competition format ==
The competition was a single-elimination tournament. For the first time at the Olympics, a bronze medal match was played. All matches were best-of-five sets.

== Schedule ==
The schedule was impacted by rain, with matches adjourned overnight on occasion.

The Olympics started three days after the end of the 1908 Wimbledon Championships, a scheduling issue which the Official Report recommended avoiding in the future.

| Date | Time | Round |
|---|---|---|
| Monday, 6 July 1908 | | Round of 64; Round of 32; Round of 16 |
| Tuesday, 7 July 1908 | | Round of 32; Round of 16 |
| Wednesday, 8 July 1908 | | Round of 16; Quarterfinals |
| Thursday, 9 July 1908 | | Round of 16; Quarterfinals; Semifinals |
| Friday, 10 July 1908 | | Quarterfinals; Semifinals |
| Saturday, 11 July 1908 | | Bronze medal match Final |

== Draw ==
=== Key ===
- Q = Qualifier
- WC = Wild card
- LL = Lucky loser
- Alt = Alternate
- ITF = ITF entry
- PR = Protected ranking
- SR = Special ranking
- SE = Special exempt
- JE = Junior exempt
- JR = Junior Accelerator Programme entrant
- CO = College Accelerator Programme entrant
- NG = Next Gen Accelerator Program entrant
- w/o = Walkover
- r = Retired
- d = Defaulted

=== Finals ===
Quarterfinals
Maurice Germot (FRA) | 0 | 0^{r}
Major Ritchie (GBR) | 6 | 4
Charles Dixon (GBR) | 3 | 5 | 3
Wilberforce Eaves (GBR) | 6 | 7 | 6
Otto Froitzheim (GER) | 6 | 6 | 5 | 6
George Caridia (GBR) | 4 | 1 | 7 | 1
John Richardson (RSA) | 6 | 6 | 6
Claude Russell-Brown (CAN) | 3 | 1 | 0

Semifinals
Major Ritchie (GBR) | 2 | 6 | 6 | 6
Wilberforce Eaves (GBR) | 6 | 1 | 4 | 1
Otto Froitzheim (GER) | 2 | 6 | 6 | 6
John Richardson (RSA) | 6 | 1 | 4 | 4

Finals
Major Ritchie (GBR) | 7 | 6 | 6
Otto Froitzheim (GER) | 5 | 3 | 4
Third place
Wilberforce Eaves (GBR) | 6 | 6 | 6
John Richardson (RSA) | 2 | 2 | 3

=== Top half ===
==== Section 1 ====
First round

Second round
V Károly (BOH)
H Suckling (CAN) | w/o
M Germot (FRA) | 7 | 6 | 6
H Schomburgk (GER) | 5 | 4 | 2
M Ritchie (GBR) | 6 | 6 | 6
V Gauntlett (RSA) | 1 | 4 | 1
W Crawley (GBR)
G Hillyard (GBR) | w/o

Third round
V Károly (BOH) | w/o
M Germot (FRA)
M Ritchie (GBR) | 6 | 6 | 6
W Crawley (GBR) | 1 | 4 | 1

Quarterfinals
M Germot (FRA) | 0 | 0^{r}
M Ritchie (GBR) | 6 | 4

==== Section 2 ====
First round
C Dixon (GBR) | 6 | 7 | 6
F Rahe (GER) | 2 | 5 | 4
B Hykš (BOH)
O Schmid (HUN) | w/o
J Zsigmondy (HUN)
L Ivánka (HUN) | w/o
M von Bissing (GER)
G Ball-Greene (GBR) | w/o
A Zborzil (AUT)
A Gore (GBR) | w/o
K von Wessely (AUT)
HR Barrett (GBR) | w/o
W Eaves (GBR) | 6 | 6 | 6
R Kinzl (AUT) | 3 | 1 | 0

Second round
D Lauber (HUN) | 1 | 0 | 0
C Dixon (GBR) | 6 | 6 | 6
B Hykš (BOH) | 7 | 6 | 3 | 6
J Zsigmondy (HUN) | 5 | 4 | 6 | 0
M von Bissing (GER) | 6 | 6 | 6
A Zborzil (AUT) | 1 | 4 | 4
K von Wessely (AUT) | w/o
W Eaves (GBR)

Third round
C Dixon (GBR) | 6 | 6 | 6
B Hykš (BOH) | 1 | 2 | 3
M von Bissing (GER) | 6 | 5 | 5
W Eaves (GBR) | 8 | 7 | 7

Quarterfinals
C Dixon (GBR) | 3 | 5 | 3
W Eaves (GBR) | 6 | 7 | 6

=== Bottom half ===
==== Section 3 ====
First round
E Tóth (HUN) | 6 | 2
J Mičovský (BOH) | 3 | 1^{r}
JC Parke (GBR)
J Rössler-Ořovský (BOH) | w/o
O Kreuzer (GER) | 6 | 6 | 6
F Pipes (AUT) | 3 | 1 | 4
O Froitzheim (GER) | 6 | 6 | 6
K Powell (GBR) | 3 | 1 | 4
R Powell (CAN) | 6 | 6 | 6
C van Lennep (NED) | 4 | 1 | 2
L Žemla (BOH)
L Doherty (GBR) | w/o

Second round
E Tóth (HUN) | 1 | 3 | 2
JC Parke (GBR) | 6 | 6 | 6
O Kreuzer (GER) | 2 | 3 | 3
O Froitzheim (GER) | 6 | 6 | 6
R Powell (CAN) | 2 | 6 | 6 | 6
L Žemla (BOH) | 6 | 0 | 4 | 1
G Caridia (GBR) | 6 | 6 | 6
H Kitson (RSA) | 1 | 3 | 1

Third round
JC Parke (GBR) | 4 | 9 | 4
O Froitzheim (GER) | 6 | 11 | 6
R Powell (CAN) | 4 | 6 | 4 | 2
G Caridia (GBR) | 6 | 3 | 6 | 6

Quarterfinals
O Froitzheim (GER) | 6 | 6 | 5 | 6
G Caridia (GBR) | 4 | 1 | 7 | 1

==== Section 4 ====
First round

Second round
J Foulkes (CAN) | 6 | 6 | 6
R van Lennep (NED) | 2 | 4 | 3
J Richardson (RSA)
M Decugis (FRA) | w/o
D Slíva (BOH)
J Žemla (BOH) | w/o
C Brown (CAN)
Z Žemla (BOH) | w/o

Third round
J Foulkes (CAN) | 2 | 4 | 3
J Richardson (RSA) | 6 | 6 | 6
D Slíva (BOH) | 2 | 1 | 2
C Brown (CAN) | 6 | 6 | 6

Quarterfinals
J Richardson (RSA) | 6 | 6 | 6
C Brown (CAN) | 3 | 1 | 0

== Results summary ==
| Rank | Player | Nation | Round of 64 | Round of 32 | Round of 16 | Quarterfinals | Semifinals | Final |
|---|---|---|---|---|---|---|---|---|
| 1st place, gold medalist(s) | Major Ritchie | Great Britain | Bye | V Gauntlett (RSA); W 6–1, 6–4, 6–1 | W Crawley (GBR); W 6–1, 6–4, 6–1 | M Germot (FRA); W 6–0, 6–4^{r} | W Eaves (GBR); W 2–6, 6–1, 6–4, 6–1 | O Froitzheim (GER); W 7–5, 6–3, 6–4 |
| 2nd place, silver medalist(s) | Otto Froitzheim | Germany | K Powell (GBR); W 6–3, 6–1, 6–4 | O Kreuzer (GER); W 6–2, 6–3, 6–3 | JC Parke (GBR); W 6–4, 11–9, 6–4 | G Caridia (GBR); W 6–4, 6–1, 5–7, 6–1 | J Richardson (RSA); W 2–6, 6–1, 6–4, 6–4 | M Ritchie (GBR); L 7–5, 6–3, 6–4 |
| 3rd place, bronze medalist(s) | Wilberforce Eaves | Great Britain | R Kinzl (AUT); W 6–3, 6–1, 6–0 | K von Wessely (AUT); W w/o | M von Bissing (GER); W 8–6, 7–5, 7–5 | C Dixon (GBR); W 6–3, 7–5, 6–3 | M Ritchie (GBR); L 2–6, 6–1, 6–4, 6–1 | J Richardson (RSA); W 6–2, 6–2, 6–3 |
| 4 | John Richardson | South Africa | Bye | M Decugis (FRA); W w/o | J Foulkes (CAN); W 6–2, 6–4, 6–3 | C Brown (CAN); W 6–3, 6–1, 6–0 | O Froitzheim (GER); L 2–6, 6–1, 6–4, 6–4 | W Eaves (GBR); L 6–2, 6–2, 6–3 |
| 5 | George Caridia | Great Britain | Bye | H Kitson (RSA); W 6–1, 6–3, 6–1 | R Powell (CAN); W 6–4, 3–6, 6–4, 6–2 | O Froitzheim (GER); L 6–4, 6–1, 5–7, 6–1 | did not advance | |
| 5 | Charles P. Dixon | Great Britain | F Rahe (GER); W 6–2, 7–5, 6–4 | D Lauber (HUN); W 6–1, 6–0, 6–0 | B Hykš (BOH); W 6–1, 6–2, 6–3 | W Eaves (GBR); L 6–3, 7–5, 6–3 | did not advance | |
| 5 | Maurice Germot | France | Bye | H Schomburgk (GER); W 7–5, 6–4, 6–2 | V Károly (BOH); W w/o | M Ritchie (GBR); L 6–0, 6–4^{r} | did not advance | |
| 5 | Claude Russell-Brown | Canada | Bye | Z Žemla (BOH); W w/o | D Slíva (BOH); W 6–2, 6–1, 6–2 | J Richardson (RSA); L 6–3, 6–1, 6–0 | did not advance | |
| 9 | Moritz von Bissing | Germany | G Ball-Greene (GBR); W w/o | A Zborzil (AUT); W 6–1, 6–4, 6–4 | W Eaves (GBR); L 8–6, 7–5, 7–5 | did not advance | | |
| 9 | Walter Crawley | Great Britain | Bye | G Hillyard (GBR); W w/o | M Ritchie (GBR); L 6–1, 6–4, 6–1 | did not advance | | |
| 9 | J. F. Foulkes | Canada | Bye | R van Lennep (NED); W 6–2, 6–4, 6–3 | J Richardson (RSA); L 6–2, 6–4, 6–3 | did not advance | | |
| 9 | Bohuslav Hykš | Bohemia | O Schmid (HUN); W w/o | J Zsigmondy (HUN); W 7–5, 6–4, 3–6, 6–0 | C Dixon (GBR); L 6–1, 6–2, 6–3 | did not advance | | |
| 9 | James Cecil Parke | Great Britain | J Rössler-Ořovský (BOH); W w/o | E Tóth (HUN); W 6–1, 6–3, 6–2 | O Froitzheim (GER); L 6–4, 11–9, 6–4 | did not advance | | |
| 9 | Robert Powell | Canada | C van Lennep (NED); W 6–4, 6–1, 6–2 | L Žemla (BOH); W 2–6, 6–0, 6–4, 6–1 | G Caridia (GBR); L 6–4, 3–6, 6–4, 6–2 | did not advance | | |
| 9 | David Slíva | Bohemia | Bye | J Žemla (BOH); W w/o | C Brown (CAN); L 6–2, 6–1, 6–2 | did not advance | | |
| 16 | Victor Gauntlett (tennis) | South Africa | Bye | M Ritchie (GBR); L 6–1, 6–4, 6–1 | did not advance | | | |
| 16 | Harold Kitson | South Africa | Bye | G Caridia (GBR); L 6–1, 6–3, 6–1 | did not advance | | | |
| 16 | Oscar Kreuzer | Germany | F Pipes (AUT); W 6–3, 6–1, 6–4 | O Froitzheim (GER); L 6–2, 6–3, 6–3 | did not advance | | | |
| 16 | Dezső Lauber | Hungary | Bye | C Dixon (GBR); L 6–1, 6–0, 6–0 | did not advance | | | |
| 16 | Heinrich Schomburgk | Germany | Bye | M Germot (FRA); L 7–5, 6–4, 6–2 | did not advance | | | |
| 16 | Ede Tóth | Hungary | J Mičovský (BOH); W 6–3, 2–1^{r} | JC Parke (GBR); L 6–1, 6–3, 6–2 | did not advance | | | |
| 16 | Roelof van Lennep | Netherlands | Bye | JF Foulkes (CAN); L 6–2, 6–4, 6–3 | did not advance | | | |
| 16 | Arthur Zborzil | Austria | A Gore (GBR); W w/o | M von Bissing (GER); L 6–1, 6–4, 6–4 | did not advance | | | |
| 16 | Ladislav Žemla | Bohemia | L Doherty (GBR); W w/o | R Powell (CAN); L 2–6, 6–0, 6–4, 6–1 | did not advance | | | |
| 16 | Jenő Zsigmondy | Hungary | L Ivánka (HUN); W w/o | B Hykš (BOH); L 7–5, 6–4, 3–6, 6–0 | did not advance | | | |
| 26 | Kenneth Powell | Great Britain | O Froitzheim (GER); L 6–3, 6–1, 6–4 | did not advance | | | | |
| 26 | Rolf Kinzl | Austria | W Eaves (GBR); L 6–3, 6–1, 6–0 | did not advance | | | | |
| 26 | Josef Mičovský | Bohemia | E Tóth (HUN); L 6–3, 2–1^{r} | did not advance | | | | |
| 26 | Felix Pipes | Austria | O Kreuzer (GER); L 6–3, 6–1, 6–4 | did not advance | | | | |
| 26 | Friedrich Wilhelm Rahe | Germany | C Dixon (GBR); L 6–2, 7–5, 6–4 | did not advance | | | | |
| 26 | Christiaan van Lennep | Netherlands | R Powell (CAN); L 6–4, 6–1, 6–2 | did not advance | | | | |
| — | Herbert Roper Barrett | Great Britain | K von Wessely (AUT); L w/o | did not advance | | | | |
| — | G Ball-Greene | Great Britain | M von Bissing (GER); L w/o | did not advance | | | | |
| — | Max Decugis | France | Bye | J Richardson (RSA); L w/o | did not advance | | | |
| — | Laurence Doherty | Great Britain | L Žemla (BOH); L w/o | did not advance | | | | |
| — | Arthur Gore | Great Britain | A Zborzil (AUT); L w/o | did not advance | | | | |
| — | George Hillyard | Great Britain | Bye | W Crawley (GBR); L w/o | did not advance | | | |
| — | L. Ivánka | Hungary | J Zsigmondy (HUN); L w/o | did not advance | | | | |
| — | Vitus Károly | Bohemia | Bye | H Suckling (CAN); W w/o | M Germot (FRA); L w/o | did not advance | | |
| — | Josef Rössler-Ořovský | Bohemia | JC Parke (GBR); L w/o | did not advance | | | | |
| — | Ödön Schmid | Hungary | B Hykš (BOH); L w/o | did not advance | | | | |
| — | Hedley Suckling | Canada | Bye | Vitus Károly (BOH); L w/o | did not advance | | | |
| — | Kurt von Wessely | Austria | HR Barrett (GBR); W w/o | W Eaves (GBR); L w/o | did not advance | | | |
| — | Jaroslav Žemla | Bohemia | Bye | D Slíva (BOH); L w/o | did not advance | | | |
| — | Zdeněk Žemla | Bohemia | Bye | C Brown (CAN); L w/o | did not advance | | | |
