= British Columbia Championships =

Defunct tennis tournament
- Tour: ILTF Circuit (1913=69)
- Founded: 1886; 140 years ago
- Abolished: 1978; 48 years ago
- Venue: Victoria Lawn Tennis Club (1887-49); Victoria Lawn Tennis and Badminton Club (1950-62); Victoria Racquet Club (1963-78)

The British Columbia Championships also known as the British Columbia Lawn Tennis Championships or the Labatts British Columbia Championships (for sponsorship reasons) was a men's and women's international tennis tournament founded in 1886 as the Victoria Lawn Tennis Challenge Cup. also called the British Columbia Challenge Cup.

It was first played at the Esquimalt Royal Navy Dockyard, Victoria British Columbia, Canada. The tournament ran as part of ILTF Circuit until 1973. The tournament continued as part of the Satellite Circuit until 1978 when it was discontinued.

== History ==
In 1886 Victoria Lawn Tennis Challenge Cup was played at the naval base of the British Royal Navy in Esquimalt Royal Navy Dockyard, Esquimalt, Canada. The tournament was then organized by the Victoria Lawn Tennis Club (f. 1884) During the World War I, from 1915 to 1918, the championships were not held. In 1925, 1926, and 1930 the tournament was jointly valid as Canadian International Championships. From 1940 to 1945 the tournament was not held again due to World War II.

In 1973 the event ceased to be a part of the worldwide ILTF Circuit. In 1974 it was downgraded to the Satellite Circuit joining the Western Satellite Circuit. In 1975 it became part of the Pacific Northwest Satellite Tour. In 1976 it was part American Express Western Challenger Circuit. In 1975 the Labatt Brewing Company took over sponsorship the event. In 1977 the tournament was not held. In 1978 in its final year it became part of the Canadian Challenger Circuit then was discontinued.

== Venue ==
The tournament was held at the Victoria Lawn Tennis Club. In 1950 its name was changed to the Victoria Lawn Tennis and Badminton Club. In 1963 the club's name was altered again to the Victoria Racquet Club. The event was played exclusively on grass courts until 1966 when it switched to hard courts.

== Finals ==
Notes 1: Challenge Round: the final round of a tournament, in which the winner of a single-elimination phase faces the previous year's champion, who plays only that one match. The challenge round was used in the early history of tennis (from 1877 through 1921), in some tournaments not all.

(CR) Indicates a challenge round was in operation

=== Men's singles ===
Included:

Year	Champion	Runner up	Score
British Columbia Challenge Cup
1886	(Canada) R. H. Handcock	(United Kingdom) Julian Gaisford	?
1887	(Canada) R. H. Handcock (2)	(Canada) Harvey Coombe	3–0, retd.
British Columbia Lawn Tennis Championships
1888 (CR)	(Canada) John Chawner Williams	(Canada) R. H. Handcock	?
1889 (CR)	(Canada) Charles Longe	(Canada) John Chawner Williams	6–1, 6–0, 6–0
1890 (CR)	(Canada) Charles Longe (2)	(Canada) Harvey Combe	4–6, 6–8, 7–5, 6–0, 6–2
1891 (CR)	(Canada) Charles Longe (3)	(Canada) John Fortescue Foulkes	6–8, 6–0, 6–1, 6–3
1892	(Canada) John Fortescue Foulkes	(Canada) Arthur Longe	6–3, 6–3, 6–3
1893	(Canada) Charles Longe (4)	(United States) Lancelot Pelly	6–0, 6–1, 6–3
1894	(Canada) John Fortescue Foulkes (2)	(Canada) Charles Longe	6–1, 4–6, 6–3, 6–4
1895	(Canada) John Fortescue Foulkes (3)	(Canada) Harvey Combe	2–6, 6–2, 6–2, 6–4
1896	(Canada) John Fortescue Foulkes (4)	(United States) George Hurd	6–1, 7–5, 6–4
1897	(Canada) John Fortescue Foulkes (5)	(United States) George Hurd	6–0, 6–1, 6–1
1898	(Canada) John Fortescue Foulkes (6)	(Canada) Robert Branks Powell	6–1, 6–2, 6–1
1899 (CR)	(Canada) John Fortescue Foulkes (7)	(United States) Lancelot Pelly	6–1, 6–2, 6–2
1900 (CR)	(Canada) John Fortescue Foulkes (8)	(Canada) Robert Powell	6–1, 6–2, 6–1
1901	(Canada) Robert Powell	(Canada) Albert Goward	6–1, 6–2, 6–3
1902 (CR)	(Canada) Albert Goward	(Canada) Robert Powell	6–0, 6–1, 6–0
1903 (CR)	(Canada) Robert Powell (2)	(Canada) Albert Goward	7–5, 6–0, 6–3
1904 (CR)	(Canada) Robert Powell (3)	(United States) Walter Bethel	6–3, 3–6, 7–5, 6–1
1905	(Canada) Capt. Wright	(Canada) Bernie Schwengers	6–4, 6–4, 2–6, 6–2
1906	(United States) Joe Tyler	(Canada) Bernie Schwengers	5–7, 6–1, 6–1, 1–6, 6–4
1907 (CR)	(Canada) Bernie Schwengers	(United States) Joe Tyler	8–6, 6–2, 3–6, 6–4
1908 (CR)	(Canada) Bernie Schwengers (2)	(Canada) Bruce Smith	6–3, 6–1, 6–2
1909 (CR)	(United States) Joe Tyler (2)	(Canada) Bernie Schwengers	5–7, 6–1, 6–1, 1–6, 6–4
1910 (CR)	(Canada) Bernie Schwengers (3)	(United States) Joe Tyler	6–2, 6–1, 6–0
1911	(United States) Joe Tyler (3)	(Canada) Beverly Rhodes	7–5, 6–0, 6–2
1912 (CR)	(United States) Bill Johnston	(United States) Joe Tyler	6–0, 7–5, 6–1
1913	(United States) Joe Tyler (4)	(Canada) Herbert Garrett	6–4, 6–3, 6–2
1914	(Canada) Bernie Schwengers (4)	(United States) Henry Breck	6–2, 6–1, 6–4
1915–1918: Not held (due to World War I)
1919	(Canada) Ashley Stuart Milne	(Canada) R. C. Mercer	10–8, 6–1, 6–2
1920 (CR)	(United States) Phil Neer	(Canada) Ashley Stuart Milne	3–6, 6–2, 11–9, 6–3
1921	(United States) Marshall Allen	(United States) Carl Gardner	6–4, 6–4, 8–6
1922 (HR)	(Canada) Keith Verley	(United States) Marshall Allen	8–6, 5–7, 7–5, 6–3
1923	(Canada) Keith Verley (2)	(Canada) John Proctor	7–5, 6–2, 5–7, 6–3
1924	(United States) Ray Casey	(United States) Ed Chandler	6–1, 6–2, 6–3
1925	(Canada) Leroy Rennie	(Canada) Marsh Gordon	6–2, 6–2, 6–3
1926	(United States) Leon de Turenne	(United States) Wallace Scott	6–4, 6–3, 6–0
1927	(United States) John Risso	(United States) Bradshaw Harrison	6–3, 6–3, 3–6, 6–2
1928	(United States) Bradshaw Harrison	(United States) Leon de Turenne	6–3, 3–6, 9–7, 6–1
1929	(United States) Jerry Bartosh	(United States) Kurt Berndt	6–3, 6–1, 10–8
1930	(United States) Joe Coughlin	(United States) Henry Prusoff	6–2, 4–6, 8–6, 6–3
1931	(United States) Henry Prusoff	(United States) Laurason Driscoll	10–8, 1–6, 6–0, 7-5
1932	(United States) Henry Prusoff (2)	(United States) John Murio	6:2, 6:3, 6:2
1933	(United States) John Murio	(United States) Charlie Hunt	6–3, 6–2, 6-2
1934	(United States) Mel Dranga	(United States) Wayne Sabin	6–0, 8–6, 6-1
1935	(United States) Gene Smith	(United States) Dick Bennett	8-6, 6–2, 7-5
1936	(United States) John Murio (2)	(United States) Verne Hughes	6–4, 6–1, 6-4
1937	(United States) Dick Bennett	(United States) Morton Ballogh	6–2, 6–0, 3–6, 5–7, 6-2
1938	(United States) Mel Dranga (2)	(United States) Bobby Caruthers	6:3, 2:6, 2:6, 6:2, 6:1
1939	(United States) Eddie Amark	(United States) Tate Coulthard	7–5, 6–4, 6-3
1940–1945: No held (due to World War II)
British Columbia Championships
1946	(United States) Bud Gilmore	(United States) Sam Lee	5–7, 1–6, 7–5, 6–4, 6-1
1947	(United States) Arnold Beisser	(United States) Merwin Miller	6–4, 6–4, 6-1
1948	(United States) John Fleitz	(United States) Jack Lowe	2–6, 6–4, 6–1, 7-5
1949	(United States) Jim Kroesen	(United States) Jack Shoemaker	6–4, 11–13, 7–5, 6-4
1950	(Canada) Lorne Main	(United States) Ed Kauder	6–2, 7–5, 6-1
1951	(United States) Merwin Miller	(Canada) Paul Willey	7–9, 6–3, 6–4, 2–6, 6-3
1952	(United States) Jerry DeWitts	(United States) Fred Fisher	7–5, 6–2, 6-0
1953	(United States) Jim Demas	(United States) Stanley Hack	3–6, 6–3, 4–6, 6–3, 6-0
1954	(United States) Seth Petersen	(United States) Jim Demas	4–6, 6–0, 6–3, 8-6
1955	(United States) Harry Buttimer	(United States) Joe Woolfson	6–4, 4–6, 6-1
1956	(Canada) Paul Willey	(United States) Bill Rose	6–2, 6–0, 6-3
1957	(United States) Merwin Miller (2)	(United States) Gordon Davis	6–4, 6–3, 6-2
1958	(United States) Jim Watson	(United States) Bill Rose	4–6, 2–6, 6–2, 6–3, 7-5
1959	(United States) Bill Hoogs Jr.	(United States) Dale Rohland	6–1, 3–6, 1–6, 6–4, 6-2
1960	(United States) Bobby Delgado	(United States) Forrest Stewart	1–6, 6–1, 6–4, 6–8, 6-2
1961	(Japan) Yoshi Minegishi	(United States) Paul Welles	6–3, 6–4, 4–6, 6-3
1962	(United States) Dave Sanderlin	(United States) Chuck Rambeau	6–4, 4–6, 6–4, 6-4
1963	(United States) Jerry Cromwell	(United States) Bob Sherman	6–4, 3–6, 6-4
1964	(Mexico) Jaime Subirats	(United States) Steve Tidbal	6–3, 6-3
1965	(United States) Dick Leach	(United States) Jack Neer	7–5, 7-5
1966	(Canada) Bob Puddiecombe	(Canada) Don McCormick	6–2, 6–4, 12-10
1967	(United States) Tom Muench	(United States) Doug Verdieck	1–6, 6–4, 6-0
1968	(United States) Jim Parker	(United States) Bill Tym	11–9, 8-6
Open era
1969	(United States) Pierce Kelley	(United States) Craig Hardy	6–3, 6-2
1970	(United States) Steve Cornell	(United States) Mike Mullan	6–2, 6-2
1971	(United States) Avery Rush	(Mexico) Manuel Castenada	6–4, 7-5
1972	(United States) Chip Fisher	(Australia) Peter Campbell	6–3, 6-2
1973	(Brazil) João Soares	(United States) Bill Hoover	6–1, 6-4
1974	(United States) Chip Fisher (2)	(United States) Jerry Van Linge	4–6, 7–5, 7-6
Labatts British Columbia Championships
1975	(United States) Dave Kanter	(Puerto Rico) Stan Pasarell	7–6, 6-3
1976	(Australia) Paul McNamee	(United States) Dick Bohrnstedt	7–6, 6-3
1977: Event not held
1978	(Australia) Bill Lloyd	(United States) Bruce Kleege	6–2, 6-1
