= Austria at the 1908 Summer Olympics =

- IOC code: AUT
- NOC: Austrian Olympic Committee

in London
- Competitors: 7 in 4 sports
- Medals Ranked 19th: Gold 0 Silver 0 Bronze 1 Total 1

Summer Olympics appearances (overview)
- 1896; 1900; ~~1904~~; 1908; 1912; 1920; 1924; 1928; 1932; 1936; 1948; 1952; 1956; 1960; 1964; 1968; 1972; 1976; 1980; 1984; 1988; 1992; 1996; 2000; 2004; 2008; 2012; 2016; 2020; 2024; 2028

Other related appearances
- 1906 Intercalated Games

Austria competed at the 1908 Summer Olympics in London, England. Austrian and Hungarian results at early Olympic Games are generally kept separate despite the union of the two nations as Austria-Hungary at the time.

== Medalists ==
Medal	Name	Sport	Event	Date
Bronze	Otto Scheff	Swimming	Men's 400 m freestyle	July 16

== Results by event ==
=== Athletics ===
Event	Place	Athlete	Heats	Semifinals	Final
Men's 100 metres	Heats	Eduard Schönecker	Unknown; 4th, heat 13	Did not advance	
Men's 200 metres	Heats	Eduard Schönecker	Unknown; 3rd, heat 12	Did not advance	
Men's marathon	25th	Emmerich Rath	None held		3:50:30.4
Men's marathon	—	Felix Kwieton	None held		Did not start
Men's 10 mile walk	15th	Emmerich Rath	None held	1:30:33.8; 8th, semifinal 2	Did not advance

=== Fencing ===
Austria's lone sabreur advanced to the second round before being eliminated.

Event	Place	Fencer	First round	Second round	Semi- final	Final
Men's sabre	Second round	Siegfried Flesch	5-0 (1st in A)	1-3 (3rd in 6)	Did not advance	

=== Swimming ===
Event	Place	Swimmer	Heats	Semifinals	Final
Men's 100 metre freestyle	Semi- finalist	Otto Scheff	1:11.8; 1st, heat 2	Unknown; 4th, semifinal 2	Did not advance
Men's 400 metre freestyle	3rd	Otto Scheff	5:51.0; 1st, heat 7	5:40.6; 1st, semifinal 1	5:46.0
Men's 1500 metre freestyle	4th	Otto Scheff	24:15.8; 2nd, heat 6	24:25.0; 2nd, semifinal 2	Unknown

=== Tennis ===
Event	Place	Name	Round of 64	Round of 32	Round of 16	Quarter- finals	Semi- finals	Final
Men's singles	16th	Arthur Zborzil	Bye	Lost to Bissing	Did not advance			
Men's singles	26th	Rolf Kinzl	Lost to Eaves	Did not advance				
Men's singles	26th	Felix Pipes	Lost to Kreuzer	Did not advance				
Men's doubles	4th	Felix Pipes; Arthur Zborzil	None held	Bye	Bye	Lost to Ritchie/Parke	Did not advance	

Opponent nation	Wins	Losses	Percent
Great Britain	0	2	.000
Germany	0	2	.000
Total	0	4	.000

== Sources ==
- Cook, Theodore Andrea (1908). The Fourth Olympiad, Being the Official Report. London: British Olympic Association.
- De Wael, Herman (2001). "Top London 1908 Olympians". Herman's Full Olympians. Archived from the original on 12 July 2006.
