= Paul Willey =

Canadian tennis player

- Full name: Paul Arden Willey
- Country (sports): Canada
- Born: 1930 or 1931
- Died: June 5, 2005 (aged 74) Arizona, United States

Singles
- Career record: 45-57
- Career titles: 5

Grand Slam singles results
- Wimbledon: 1R (1956, 1959)
- US Open: 2R (1953)

Paul Arden Willey was a Canadian tennis player and winner of the Ontario Tennis Championships in 1954 and the 1956 ILTF British Columbia Lawn Tennis Championships. He represented Canada in the Davis Cup.

== Junior career ==
Willey, the Canadian junior champion in 1949, attended Vancouver's Kitsilano Secondary School.

== Career ==
In 1954 Willey won the Ontario Championships in singles at the Boulevard Club in Toronto defeating Lawrence Barclay in the final. He was runner-up at the same event in 1956 to Bob Bédard and in 1957 to Don Fontana, in the latter tournament playing with a sore elbow. In 1956, he defeated Nicola Pietrangeli on red clay at Florence, and in 1957 he defeated Mal Anderson on grass at Southampton.

Willey won several tournaments in British Columbia in the late 1950s. He won the 1956 ILTF British Columbia Lawn Tennis Championships at the Victoria Lawn Tennis and Badminton Club, defeating U.S. player Bill Rose, the U.S. Pacific Northwest No. 1 ranked player, in the final in straight sets. In March 1959, he won the Pacific Northwest Indoor in Vancouver defeating Lawrence Barclay in the final. Willey won the Western Canada Grass Court Championships at the Vancouver Lawn Tennis Club in August 1959, defeating U.S. player Dale Rohland in a close five set final. Rohland had eliminated Willey from the Canadian Championships the previous year.

== Davis Cup ==
He played for the Canada Davis Cup team from 1953 to 1958 and had a singles win against American Barry MacKay in 1956. Between 1959 and 1963 he served as Canada's national coach, before relocating to Arizona with wife Colleen.

== See also ==
- List of Canada Davis Cup team representatives
