= Crematogaster cornuta =

Scientific classification
- Kingdom: Animalia
- Phylum: Arthropoda
- Clade: Pancrustacea
- Class: Insecta
- Order: Hymenoptera
- Family: Formicidae
- Subfamily: Myrmicinae
- Genus: Crematogaster
- Species: C. cornuta

Binomial name
- Crematogaster cornuta Crawley, 1924

Species of ant

Crematogaster cornuta is a species of ant in tribe Crematogastrini. It was described by Crawley in 1924.
