= Granville Park =

Granville Park may refer to:

- Granville Park, Merrylands in Sydney, Australia
- Vancouver Lawn Tennis Club in Canada
