= Slíva =

Slíva is a surname. Notable people with the surname include:

- David Slíva, Czech tennis player
- Josef Slíva (1898–?), Czech figure skater

== See also ==
- Silva
