= Victor Gauntlett (tennis) =

South African tennis player

- Full name: Victor Reginald Gauntlett
- Country (sports): South Africa
- Born: 30 January 1884; Dulwich, London, England
- Died: 12 February 1949 (aged 65); Witbank, South Africa

Singles

Grand Slam singles results
- Wimbledon: 3R (1919)

Other tournaments
- Olympic Games: 2R (1908)

Doubles

Grand Slam doubles results
- Wimbledon: 2R (1913)

Other doubles tournaments
- Olympic Games: QF (1908)

Mixed doubles

Grand Slam mixed doubles results
- Wimbledon: 3R (1913)

Team competitions
- Davis Cup: QF (1913)

Victor Reginald Gauntlett (30 January 1884 – 12 February 1949) was a South African male tennis player.

== Biography ==
He competed for the South Africa in the tennis event at the 1908 Summer Olympics, where he took part in the men's singles and doubles event. In the singles competition, he was beaten in the first round by Josiah Ritchie in straight sets. In the doubles he paired up with Harold Kitson and reached the quarterfinals which they lost in five sets to the British team of Clement Cazalet and Charles Dixon.

Gauntlett reached the finals of the 1908 men's singles event at the South African Championships but was defeated by Harold Kitson in five sets. He was runner-up at the 1908 All England Plate tournament, a tennis competition held at the Wimbledon Championships, which consisted of players who were defeated in the first or second rounds of the singles competition. His best performance at a Grand Slam tournament was reaching the third round of the 1913 Wimbledon Championships in which Kenneth Powell proved too strong.

Gauntlett was a member of the 1913 South African Davis Cup team, which competed for the first time. South Africa was eliminated in the first round, played on the grass courts of the Queen's Club in London, against Canada (1–4). Gauntlett won the only point for South Africa in his first singles match. He and R.F. le Sueur lost the doubles match, and he conceded his second singles match.
