= 1913 International Lawn Tennis Challenge =

1913 edition of the International Lawn Tennis Challenge

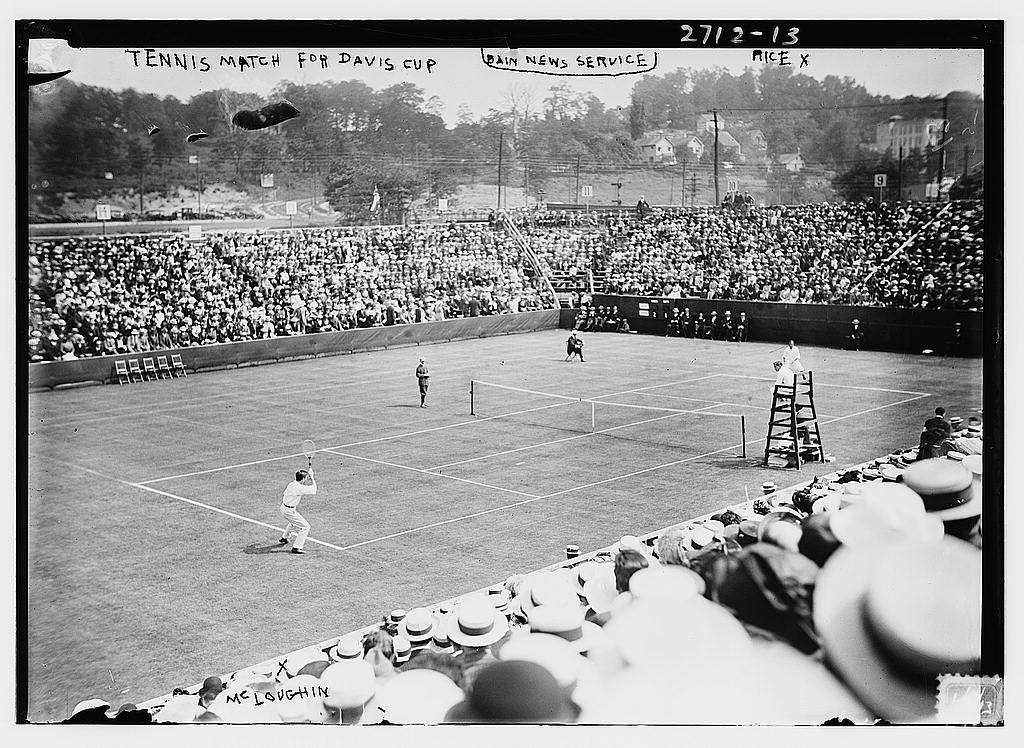
- Davis Cup 1913 quarterfinal at the West Side Tennis Club, New York - Rice (Australasia) against McLoughlin (United States)

Details
- Duration: 3 June – 28 July 1913
- Edition: 12th
- Teams: 8

Champion
- Winning nation: United States

The 1913 International Lawn Tennis Challenge was the 12th edition of what is now known as the Davis Cup. With Great Britain's win in 1912, the competition returned to Europe for the first time in five years. This prompted several new teams to join the competition, creating the largest field to date. The first round tie between Germany and France, played at Wiesbaden, Germany was the first Davis Cup tie to be played on clay courts, or any surface other than grass. The United States would triumph in the final, which was played at Worple Road in Wimbledon, London, England on 25–28 July.

== Teams ==
Canada, Germany, and South Africa all competed for the first time. Belgium returned for the first time since 1904.

== Draw ==
Quarterfinals; 3–21 June
New York, United States (grass)
Australasia	1
United States	4
Wiesbaden, Germany (clay)
Germany	4
France	1
London, England (grass)
South Africa	1
Canada	4
bye
Belgium

Semifinals; 10–12 July
Nottingham, England (grass)
United States	5
Germany	0
Folkestone, England (grass)
Canada	4
Belgium	0

Final; 17–19 July
Wimbledon, England (grass)
United States	3
Canada	0

=== Quarterfinals ===
United States vs. Australasia

United States
4
West Side Tennis Club, New York, NY, United States
6–9 June 1913
Grass

Australasia
1

			1	2	3	4	5
1	(United States) (Australasia)	Maurice McLoughlin; Horace Rice	6; 1	6; 3	6; 3
2	(United States) (Australasia)	Richard Norris Williams; Stanley Doust	6; 4	6; 4	1; 6	7; 5
3	(United States) (Australasia)	Harold Hackett / Maurice McLoughlin; Stanley Doust / Alfred Jones	6; 2	2; 6	7; 5	2; 6	7; 9
4	(United States) (Australasia)	Maurice McLoughlin; Stanley Doust	6; 4	6; 4	6; 2
5	(United States) (Australasia)	Richard Norris Williams; Horace Rice	1; 6	4; 6	9; 7	6; 1	6; 2

Germany vs. France

Germany
4
Wiesbaden, Germany
3–5 June 1913
Clay

France
1

			1	2	3	4	5
1	(Germany) (France)	Oscar Kreuzer; André Gobert	1; 6	6; 4	6; 2	6; 3
2	(Germany) (France)	Friedrich Wilhelm Rahe; Max Decugis	6; 2	4; 6	6; 2	6; 8	5; 7
3	(Germany) (France)	Heinrich Kleinschroth / Friedrich Wilhelm Rahe; Max Decugis / Maurice Germot	7; 5	6; 4	4; 6	9; 7
4	(Germany) (France)	Oscar Kreuzer; Max Decugis						w/o
5	(Germany) (France)	Friedrich Wilhelm Rahe; André Gobert	6; 1	6; 1	6; 1

Canada vs. South Africa

Canada
4
Queen's Club, London, England
19–21 June 1913
Grass

South Africa
1

			1	2	3	4	5
1	(Canada) (South Africa)	Robert Powell; R.F. le Sueur	6; 3	6; 4	4; 6	3; 6	7; 5
2	(Canada) (South Africa)	Bernard Schwengers; Victor Gauntlett	9; 11	3; 6	0; 6
3	(Canada) (South Africa)	Robert Powell / Bernard Schwengers; Victor Gauntlett / R.F. le Sueur	7; 5	6; 3	3; 6	6; 3
4	(Canada) (South Africa)	Robert Powell; Victor Gauntlett						w/o
5	(Canada) (South Africa)	Bernard Schwengers; R.F. le Sueur	6; 3	6; 3	6; 3

=== Semifinals ===
United States vs. Germany

United States
5
Nottingham Lawn Tennis Club, Nottingham, England
10–12 July 1913
Grass

Germany
0

			1	2	3	4	5
1	(United States) (Germany)	Richard Norris Williams; Oscar Kreuzer	7; 5	6; 4	4; 6	6; 1
2	(United States) (Germany)	Maurice McLoughlin; Otto Froitzheim	5; 7	2; 6	6; 4	6; 2	6; 2
3	(United States) (Germany)	Harold Hackett / Maurice McLoughlin; Heinrich Kleinschroth / Friedrich Wilhelm Rahe	6; 4	2; 6	6; 3	8; 6
4	(United States) (Germany)	Richard Norris Williams; Otto Froitzheim	5; 7	6; 1	6; 3	6; 1
5	(United States) (Germany)	Wallace Johnson; Oscar Kreuzer	7; 5	6; 4	5; 7	6; 4

Canada vs. Belgium

Canada
4
Pleasure Gardens, Folkestone, England
10–12 July 1913
Grass

Belgium
0

			1	2	3	4	5
1	(Canada) (Belgium)	Robert Powell; Paul de Borman	6; 2	6; 1	6; 1
2	(Canada) (Belgium)	Bernard Schwengers; Georges Watson	6; 4	6; 1	6; 0
3	(Canada) (Belgium)	Robert Powell / Bernard Schwengers; William du Vivier / Georges Watson	6; 2	6; 2	6; 2
4	(Canada) (Belgium)	Bernard Schwengers; Paul de Borman	4; 6	6; 4	6; 2	6; 2
5	(Canada) (Belgium)	Robert Powell; Georges Watson						not played

=== Final ===
United States
3
Worple Road, Wimbledon, London, England
17–19 July 1913
Grass

Canada
0

			1	2	3	4	5
1	(United States) (Canada)	Richard Norris Williams; Bernard Schwengers	6; 4	6; 2	6; 4
2	(United States) (Canada)	Maurice McLoughlin; Robert Powell	10; 8	6; 1	6; 4
3	(United States) (Canada)	Harold Hackett / Maurice McLoughlin; Robert Powell / Bernard Schwengers	6; 3	6; 3	12; 10
4	(United States) (Canada)	Richard Norris Williams; Robert Powell						not played
5	(United States) (Canada)	Maurice McLoughlin; Bernard Schwengers						not played

== Challenge Round ==
Great Britain vs. United States

Great Britain
2
Worple Road, Wimbledon, London, England
25–28 July 1913
Grass

United States
3

			1	2	3	4	5
1	(United Kingdom) (United States)	James Cecil Parke; Maurice McLoughlin	8; 10	7; 5	6; 4	1; 6	7; 5
2	(United Kingdom) (United States)	Charles Dixon; Richard Norris Williams	6; 8	6; 3	2; 6	6; 1	5; 7
3	(United Kingdom) (United States)	Charles Dixon / Herbert Roper Barrett; Harold Hackett / Maurice McLoughlin	7; 5	1; 6	6; 2	5; 7	4; 6
4	(United Kingdom) (United States)	Charles Dixon; Maurice McLoughlin	6; 8	3; 6	2; 6
5	(United Kingdom) (United States)	James Cecil Parke; Richard Norris Williams	6; 2	5; 7	5; 7	6; 4	6; 2
