= Charles Hefferon =

South African long-distance runner

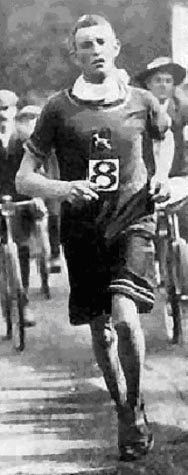

Personal information
- Born: 25 February 1878 Newbury, England
- Died: 1 May 1932 (aged 54) Brampton, Ontario

Sport
- Country: South Africa
- Sport: Athletics
- Event: Marathon
Medal record
Men's athletics
Representing South Africa
Olympic Games
Silver medal – second place	1908 London	Marathon

Charles Archer Hefferon (25 January 1878 – 13 May 1932) was an athlete representing South Africa who competed mainly in the marathon. Hefferon was born in Newbury, Berkshire, England, to an Irish father and an English mother but moved with his family to Canada and was raised on a farm near Brandon, Manitoba. He settled in South Africa after fighting in the Boer War, where he worked as a prison officer in Bloemfontein.

He competed for South Africa in the 1908 Summer Olympics held in London, Great Britain in the marathon where he won the silver medal in the race famous for the dramatic finish of Dorando Pietri. Hefferon was leading until the last mile and a half, when he lost ground after accepting a drink of champagne and being patted on the back by a well-wisher in the crowd. He was overtaken by Pietri, who was subsequently disqualified for being helped over the line, and by the eventual winner, Johnny Hayes of the United States.

In 1909, he won his fifth South African national title for the 4 mile run (as well as one for 10 miles), but turned professional and moved to England, winning 4 and 10 mile titles there in 1910. In 1912, he returned to Canada and settled near Simcoe, Ontario. During World War I, he enlisted and served with the Royal Canadian Dragoons. After the war, Hefferon became acting chief of police in Dunnville before transferring to the Ontario Provincial Police. He worked on special assignments in Hamilton and then transferred to motorcycle patrol with the Department of Highways in Brantford, Blenheim, and starting in 1930 in Brampton.

Hefferon died in Brampton in 1932, when he was hit by a motorist while on duty.
