= Tennis at the 1912 Summer Olympics =

- Date: 5–12 May 1912 (indoor); 29 June–5 July 1912 (outdoor)
- Edition: 5th
- Surface: Wood (indoor); Clay (outdoor)
- Location: Östermalm Tennis Pavilion, Östermalm

Champions

Men's outdoor singles
- Charles Winslow (RSA)

Women's outdoor singles
- Marguerite Broquedis (FRA)

Men's outdoor doubles
- Harold Kitson / Charles Winslow (RSA)

Mixed outdoor doubles
- Dorothea Köring / Heinrich Schomburgk (GER)

Men's indoor singles
- André Gobert (FRA)

Women's indoor singles
- Edith Hannam (GBR)

Men's indoor doubles
- Maurice Germot / André Gobert (FRA)

Mixed indoor doubles
- Edith Hannam / Charles Dixon (GBR)
- Summer Olympics

At the 1912 Summer Olympics in Stockholm, Sweden eight tennis events were contested divided over two tournaments; an indoor covered courts tournament, played on wood, held from May 5 until May 12 and an outdoor hard court tournament, played on clay, held from June 28 until July 5.

Tennis on covered courts was agreed initially for the 1912 Games, with competitions run for gentlemen's singles and doubles, ladies' singles and mixed doubles. The outdoor tournament was confirmed once the Östermalm Athletic Grounds were completed in late 1911, with the plans modified to have both indoor and outdoor tournaments.

Six countries sent players for the covered court competitions, with representatives from Sweden, Great Britain, Denmark, France, Australasia and Bohemia appearing. Included in this lineup was Australasia's only competitor, the New Zealander Anthony Wilding, who was also the reigning Wimbledon gentlemen's champion. The indoor knockout competition started on 5 May, and continued as expected until the semi-final round where Wilding was beaten by Britain's Charles P. Dixon. The British player met Frenchman André Gobert in the final, but Gobert was victorious over the Englishman in straight sets. Wilding took the bronze medal in a playoff against another British player, Arthur Lowe.

The outdoors tennis competition saw seventy players enter from twelve nations. However, Great Britain did not enter any competitors as the dates of the outdoor competition clashed with the 1912 Wimbledon Championships despite attempts by the British authorities to convince the Olympic organizing committee to change the dates. Other noted tennis players including Anthony Wilding, André Gobert and Arthur Gore refused to compete at the Olympics and instead attended Wimbledon. The gold and silver medals in the gentlemen's singles ended up being decided between two South Africans, with Charles Winslow and Harold Kitson playing each other. Winslow won the match and the gold medal, 7–5, 4–6, 10–8, 8–6. The duo also competed as a pair in the gentlemen's doubles and took the gold medal, beating the Austrians Felix Pipes and Arthur Zborzil. Marguerite Broquedis of France defeated Dorothea Koring of Germany in the ladies' singles for the gold medal. In the mixed double Koring teamed up with Heinrich Schomburgk to win the gold, the duo defeating Sigrid Fick and Gunnar Setterwall of Sweden in the final.

== Medal summary ==
=== Events ===
==== Outdoor ====
Event	Gold	Silver	Bronze
Men's outdoor singles	Charles Winslow; South Africa	Harold Kitson; South Africa	Oscar Kreuzer; Germany
Men's outdoor doubles	South Africa; Harold Kitson; Charles Winslow	Austria; Felix Pipes; Arthur Zborzil	France; Albert Canet; Édouard Mény de Marangue
Women's outdoor singles	Marguerite Broquedis; France	Dorothea Köring; Germany	Molla Mallory; Norway
Mixed outdoor doubles	Germany; Dorothea Köring; Heinrich Schomburgk	Sweden; Sigrid Fick; Gunnar Setterwall	France; Marguerite Broquedis; Albert Canet

==== Indoor ====
Event	Gold	Silver	Bronze
Men's indoor singles	André Gobert; France	Charles Dixon; Great Britain	Anthony Wilding; Australasia
Men's indoor doubles	France; Maurice Germot; André Gobert	Sweden; Carl Kempe; Gunnar Setterwall	Great Britain; Alfred Beamish; Charles Dixon
Women's indoor singles	Edith Hannam; Great Britain	Sofie Castenschiold; Denmark	Mabel Parton; Great Britain
Mixed indoor doubles	Great Britain; Edith Hannam; Charles Dixon	Great Britain; Helen Aitchison; Herbert Roper Barrett	Sweden; Sigrid Fick; Gunnar Setterwall

=== Medal table ===
Rank	Nation	Gold	Silver	Bronze	Total
1	France	3	0	2	5
2	Great Britain	2	2	2	6
3	South Africa	2	1	0	3
4	Germany	1	1	1	3
5	Sweden	0	2	1	3
6	Austria	0	1	0	1
6	Denmark	0	1	0	1
8	Australasia	0	0	1	1
8	Norway	0	0	1	1
Totals (9 entries)		8	8	8	24

== Participating nations ==
A total of 82 tennis players (69 men and 13 women) from 14 nations (men from 14 nations - women from 6 nations) competed at the Stockholm Games:

- Australasia (1) (men:1 women:0)
- Austria (3) (men:3 women:0)
- Bohemia (8) (men:8 women:0)
- Denmark (10) (men:9 women:1)
- France (6) (men:5 women:1)
- Germany (7) (men:6 women:1)
- Great Britain (11) (men:8 women:3)
- Hungary (6) (men:6 women:0)
- Netherlands (1) (men:1 women:0)
- Norway (7) (men:6 women:1)
- Russian Empire (2) (men:2 women:0)
- South Africa (3) (men:3 women:0)
- Sweden (16) (men:10 women:6)
- United States (1) (men:1 women:0)
