= Ede Tóth =

Hungarian tennis player

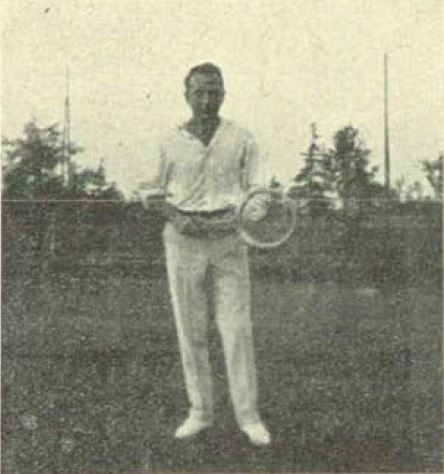
- Tóth in 1929
- Born: 8 July 1884; Oradea, Austria-Hungary
- Died: 1 March 1943 (aged 58)
- Plays: right-handed

Ede Tóth (11 March 1884 – 1 March 1943) was a Hungarian tennis player. He competed in the men's singles and doubles events at the 1908 Summer Olympics.

== Works cited ==
- "Ede Tóth Olympic Results". Sports Reference. Archived from the original on 18 April 2020.
- "Olimpiai sportolóink – Tóth Ede". mob.hu (in Hungarian). Budapest, Hungary: Hungarian Olympic Committee.
