= Roelof van Lennep =

Dutch tennis player (1876–1951)

- Country (sports): Netherlands
- Born: 3 October 1876; Wiesbaden, German Empire
- Died: 13 September 1951 (aged 74); The Hague, Netherlands

Jonkheer Roelof van Lennep (Dutch pronunciation: [ˈrulɔ fɑn ˈlɛnɛp]; (Note: In isolation, Roelof and van are pronounced [ˈrulɔf] and [vɑn], respectively.) 3 October 1876 – 13 September 1951) was a Dutch male tennis player. He competed for the Netherlands in the tennis event at the 1908 Summer Olympics where he took part in the men's singles and men's doubles competitions (partnering with his brother Christiaan).

== Tennis family and career ==
Roelof was born on 3 October 1876 to Christiaan van Lennep and his second wife Charlotta Louise Küpfer. Roelof had six siblings, and a half-sister, including Madzy, Christine, August Willem and Christiaan van Lennep, all of whom later got involved in tennis . In 1895 he and his family founded the Hilversumsche Lawn Tennisclub in their own house. Some years after they established three cement courts. His sister Christine was appointed the club's treasurer. His brother August Willem won the national championships in 1903 but died young, at the age of only 24, in 1908 in London. His sister Madzy won the ladies' doubles three consecutive times (1899-1901) and the mixed two consecutive time (1899–1900, partnering Karel Beukema) both streaks started from the inaugural championships. His brother Christiaan was the most successful amongst them winning the singles on six occasions, the doubles seven times (1904, 1905, 1907, 1908, 1912, 1916, 1923).

His breakthrough came when in 1904 he won a triple crown at the Haarlem International Championships (partnering Emilie Dolleman and J. F. Sol). In the same month he reached the finals of the Dutch International Championships in Scheveningen with his brother Christiaan but fell to Wylie Cameron Grant and Irving Wright. On top of that he became the triple crown national champion of the Netherlands after he copied his brother, August's singles feat from last year then claimed the doubles with Christiaan and finished the day with the mixed title partnering Louise Dolleman. Next year he was able to defend his doubles titles only losing the singles to Christiaan.

In 1909 he won the mixed national championships after a three-year hiatus partnering Loes Everts. In 1910 he regained his national doubles title alongside Gerard Scheurleer. In 1911 he booked his last national title in the doubles teaming up with Adolf Broese van Groenou.

== Personal life ==
Roelof was a soccer supporter as well and was the founding member of the Hilversumsche Footballclub 'T Gooi in 1889, first football club in Hilversum. He was also the director of the Tarakan Petroleum and the Kali Tello coffee estate in Jakarta at the Dutch East Indies during the 1930s. He married twice and had three children, Sylvia (who married Frits Philips), Warner and Marnix Roelof.

== Ancestry ==
Ancestors of Roelof van Lennep

16. Cornelis van Lennep
8. David Jacob van Lennep
17. Cornelia Henrietta van de Poll
4. Jacob van Lennep
18. Christiaan van Orsoy
9. Jonkvrouwe Cornelia Christina van Orsoy
19. Anna Louisa van der Poorten
2. Jonkheer Christiaan van Lennep
20. Nicolaas Willem Roëll
10. Willem Frederik Roëll
21. Anna Sophia Frederica van Gheel van Spanbroek
5. Jonkvrouwe Henrietta Sophia Wilhelmina Roëll
22. Johannes Hop
11. Sara Johanna Hop
23. Maria Henriëtta van der Hoop
1. Roelof van Lennep
6. Auguste Próspere Küpfer
3. Charlotta Louise Küpfer
7. Charlotte Louise Coblijn
