= Dulwich Farm Hard Courts =

Defunct tennis tournament
- Tour: Mens Amateur Tour (1877-1912); Women Amateur Tour (1877-1912); ILTF Mens Amateur Tour (1913-1967); ILTF Women's Amateur Tour (1913-1967)
- Founded: 1909
- Abolished: 1914
- Editions: 6
- Location: Dulwich, Surrey, England
- Venue: Dulwich Farm Club
- Surface: Clay

The Dulwich Farm Hard Courts also known as the Dulwich Farm Open was a combined clay court tennis tournament staged at Dulwich Farm Club, Dulwich, Surrey, England in 1909, that ran until 1932.

== History ==
The Dulwich Farm Hard Courts was a combined clay court tennis tournament established in 1909 and held at the Dulwich Farm Club (f.1907), Dulwich, Southwark, England. The tournament was staged only until 1914. The first edition of the men's tournament was won by Charles P. Dixon. The first edition of the women's singles was won by Dora Boothby. Following the World War I, the Dulwich Farm Club closed, and it was merged into the Dulwich Lawn Tennis Club. In 1921 Dulwich LTC formed a new event known as the Gallery Tournament that ran until 1932.

Notbable winners of the men's singles included; Charles P. Dixon who won four times from (1909–1910, 1912–1913), Major Ritchie (1914). Former winners of the women's singles title included; Dorothy Holman three-time winner (1911–1913). Aurea Farrington Edgington was the final women's singles champion.

== Tennis in Dulwich ==
Other tennis tournaments held in the same area included the Dulwich Covered Courts tournament, it was an indoor tournament that ran from 1922 to 1933. The Surrey Covered Courts, was also staged in Dulwich, that tournament ran from 1920 to 1938.

== Sources ==
- 1877 to 2012 Finals Results. stevegtennis.com. Steve G Tennis.
- Dulwich Lawn Tennis Club. Dulwich Lawn Tennis Club.
- Illustrated Sporting & Dramatic News. London: George S. Maddick. 1911
- Mcinnes, Ian. "The Story of the Dulwich Covered Courts". www.dulwichsociety.com. Dulwich Society.
- Nieuwland, Alex. "Tournament – Dulwich Farm". www.tennisarchives.com. Tennis Archives.
- The Sphere. London Illustrated Newspapers. London: 1922.
