= Claude Russell-Brown =

Canadian tennis player

- Full name: Claude Russell-Brown
- Country (sports): Canada
- Born: 11 April 1873
- Died: 19 January 1939 (aged 65)

Singles

Grand Slam singles results
- Wimbledon: 1R (1904)

Other tournaments
- Olympic Games: QF (1908)

Claude Russell-Brown (11 April 1873 – 19 January 1939) was a Canadian tennis player. He reached the quarterfinals of the men's singles event at the 1908 Summer Olympics and competed at Wimbledon in 1904.
