= John Richardson (tennis) =

South African tennis player

- Full name: John R. Richardson
- Country (sports): South Africa
- Born: 24 June 1873 Antananarivo, Madagascar

Grand Slam singles results
- Wimbledon: 3R (1903)

Other tournaments
- Olympic Games: SF – 4th (1908)

John R. Richardson (born 24 June 1873, date of death unknown) was a South African tennis player. He competed in the men's singles event at the 1908 Summer Olympics.
