= J. F. Foulkes =

Canadian tennis player

J.F. Foulkes
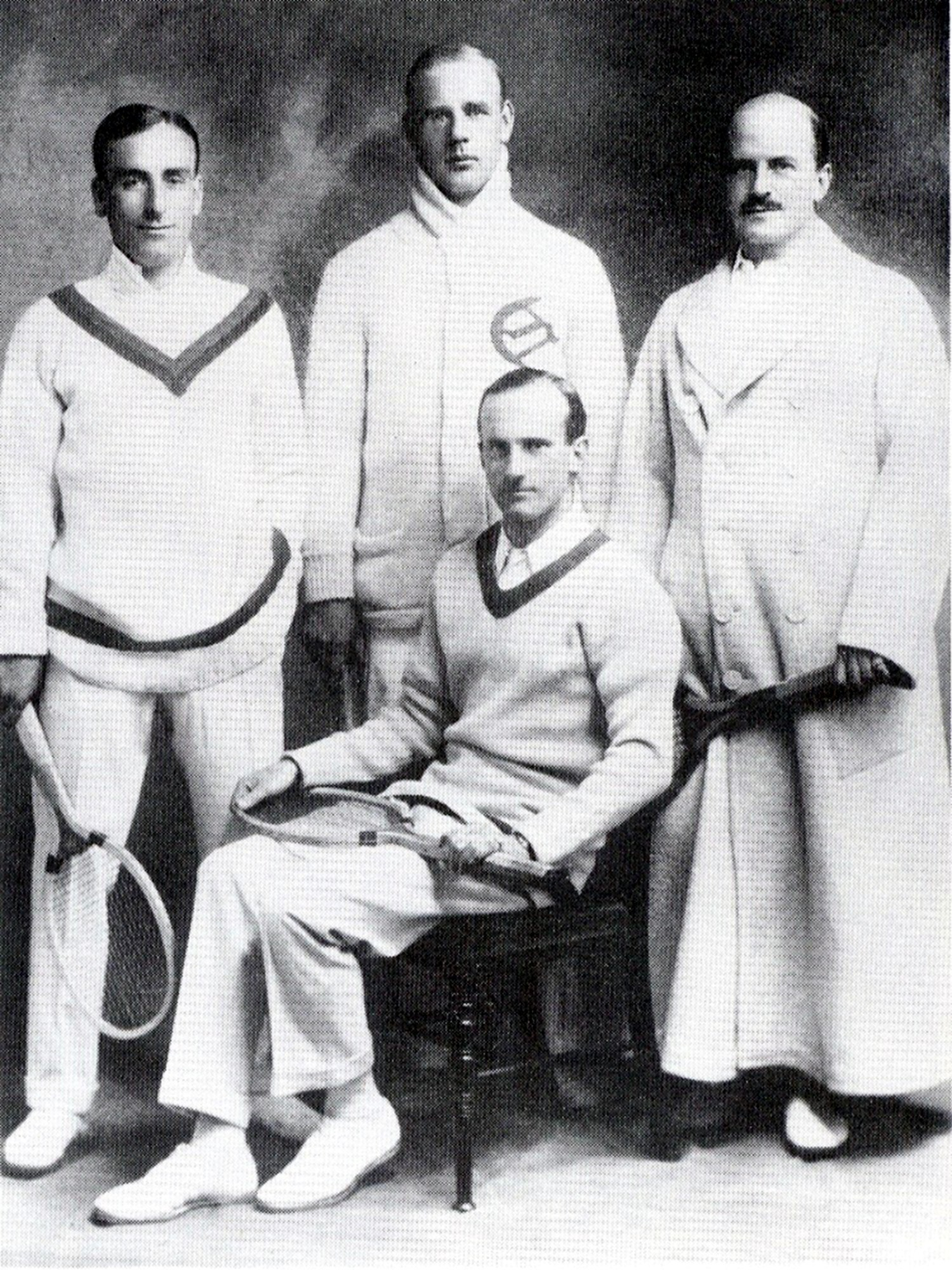
- Canada's 1913 Davis Cup team; J. F. Foulkes is at the right.
- Full name: John Fortescue Foulkes
- Country (sports): Canada
- Born: 10 July 1872 Middlesex (now London), England
- Died: 22 June 1948 (aged 75) Canada

Grand Slam singles results
- Wimbledon: 3R (1908)

Other tournaments
- Olympic Games: 3R (1908)

Team competitions
- Davis Cup: F (1913)

John Fortescue Foulkes DSO (10 July 1872 – 22 June 1948), also known as Captain Foulkes, was an early star of Canadian tennis. Foulkes may have been a three-time winner of the Canadian national championship, today known as the Rogers Cup. He was also a member of the Canadian team which reached the finals of the Davis Cup.

== Early life and family ==
Foulkes was born in Middlesex, England, the second of six children born to Rev. Augustine Lempriere Foulkes and Francesca Forster (née Godfrey). His father, who had been a cricket player, was a graduate of Queen's College, Oxford, vicar of Steventon. He had three brothers (Godfrey, Louis Augustine and Leonard) and two sisters (Francesca and Catherine). Louis was the father of Sir Nigel Foulkes.

On 2 December 1899, he married Margaret May Thomas and they had two children.

== Tennis career ==
He moved to Canada as a teenager in 1891, and quickly began winning tournaments. A member of the Victoria Lawn Tennis Club, Foulkes may have captured the Canadian national championship in singles 1907, 1909, and 1910 - at least one source says otherwise however. His 1907 win, if it did occur, broke a string of 13 consecutive wins by an American player and only the second for a Canadian in 18 years. The source that disputes that Foulkes won his titles claims he was, instead, runner-up in 1907 and again in 1908.

He competed in the men's singles and doubles events at the 1908 Summer Olympics.

Foulkes along with fellow Victoria natives B. P. Schwengers, R. B. Powell and Victoria-based Henry Mayes reached the final of the 1913 Davis Cup in the country's first attempt. (All four players were members of the Victoria LTC.) With the entire tournament played at Wimbledon in June–July, the upstart Canadians, with Powell and Schwengers playing each match, beat South Africa, 4 wins to 1 and then Belgium, 4-0, to reach the final. In the final, however, they were overwhelmed by the Americans losing each set of three matches they contested.

Foulkes was also a British Columbia, five-time Pacific Northwest champion, and two-time Washington State champion. He was ranked No. 1 singles in the USTA Pacific Northwest in 1914.

Foulkes has been elected to both the Greater Victoria Sports Hall of Fame as a member of the 1913 Davis Cup team. He was also elected to USTA Pacific Northwest Tennis Hall of Fame in 2008.

== Captain Foulkes ==
Foulkes served in the Canadian Army during the Boer War, earning the Queen's Medal with four clasps. From then on he was frequently referred to as "Captain" Foulkes. He served again during the First World War in the 4th Canadian Division in the Canadian Service Corps. He was awarded the Order of Agricultural Merit from France and was mentioned in despatches three times in 1917 and 1918. In the 1919 New Year Honours following the war, he was awarded the Distinguished Service Order.

His wife's younger sister was the poet Rosemary Thomas. Her book of poems, Immediate Sun (1951), includes a poem about Foulkes entitled "The Colonel".
