= Satellite Circuit =

Temporary cycling venue at the 1968 Summer Olympics

The Satellite Circuit was a temporary cycling venue constructed for the 1968 Summer Olympics in Mexico City. This venue hosted the road cycling individual road race and road team time trial events for those games.

It was a 24.525 km (15.239 mi) long lap, considered quite hilly, and located in Ciudad Satélite in Naucalpan, part in the western part of Greater Mexico City.
