= David Slíva =

Czech tennis player

- Full name: David Slíva

David Slíva was a Czech tennis player. He competed for Bohemia in the men's singles and doubles events at the 1908 Summer Olympics.
