= Walter Crawley =

British tennis player

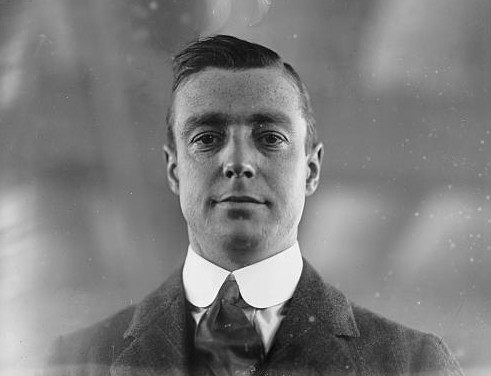
- Full name: Walter Cecil Crawley
- Country (sports): Great Britain
- Born: 29 March 1880 Masham, England
- Died: 11 October 1940 (aged 60) Graffham, England
- Turned pro: 1901 (amateur tour)
- Retired: 1927

Singles
- Career record: 155–68
- Career titles: 8

Grand Slam singles results
- Wimbledon: QF (1908)

Other tournaments
- WHCC: 2R (1920)
- WCCC: F (1920)
- Olympic Games: 3R (1908)

Doubles

Grand Slam doubles results
- Wimbledon: SF (1910, 1913)
- Olympic Games: QF (1908)

Mixed doubles

Grand Slam mixed doubles results
- Wimbledon: QF (1922, 1923)

Walter Cecil Crawley FES (29 March 1880 – 11 October 1940) was a British tennis player and entomologist. He was active from 1901 to 1927 and won 8 career singles titles.

== Life ==
Crawley was born on 29 March 1880 and educated at St John's School, Leatherhead. In 1901 he played his first tournament at the Yorkshire Championships where he lost in round three to Ernest Watson. he won his first singles title at the North of England Championships in 1907. The same year he won the inaugural Dieppe International Championship men's singles title. He competed in the singles and doubles at the 1908 Summer Olympics. In the doubles, he reached the quarterfinals with Kenneth Powell in which they lost to compatriots and eventual Olympic champions George Hillyard and Reginald Doherty.

His other career singles highlights include winning the Chichester Open (1907), the Epsom Open (1908), the Sussex Championships (1908), Roehampton Autumn Meeting (1922) and the Brockenhurst Open (1922). In addition he was also a losing finalist at the Derbyshire Championships (1903), the Northumberland Championships (1903), the Berkshire Championships (1904), the Championships of Pays-d'Enhaut (1906), the South of England Championships (1907), the Leicestershire County Lawn Tennis Championships (1908), the Championship of Europe (1908), Championship of Wales (1909), Nottinghamshire Championships (1910), Welsh Covered Court Championships (1921), the London Covered Court Championships (1921), the British Covered Court Championships (1921) and the Isle of Wight Championships (1922).

He won his final singles title in 1923 at the New Forest Open. He played his final tournament at the 1927 Wimbledon Championships. He studied ants and was a Fellow of the Entomological Society. His brother, Alfred Ernest Crawley was also a tennis player.
