= Josef Mičovský =

Czech tennis player (1884–1968)

Josef Gruss (Mičovský)
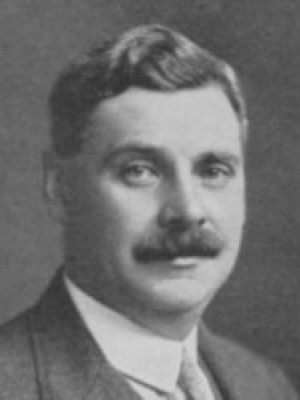
- Josef Gruss
- Born: 8 July 1884 Prague, Austria-Hungary
- Died: 28 May 1968 (aged 83) Prague, Czechoslovakia

Dr. Josef Gruss (pseudonym Josef Mičovský; 8 July 1884 – 28 May 1968) was a Czech tennis player. He competed for Bohemia in the men's singles event at the 1908 Summer Olympics.
