= Kurt von Wessely =

Austrian tennis player

- Country (sports): (Austria-Hungary) Austria–Hungary
- Born: 18 October 1881; Prague, Austria-Hungary
- Died: 25 October 1917 (aged 36); Vienna, Austria-Hungary

Singles

Grand Slam singles results
- Wimbledon: 2R (1907)

Other tournaments
- WHCC: QF (1913)
- Olympic Games: 2R (1908)

Doubles

Grand Slam doubles results
- Wimbledon: 2R (1907)

Team competitions
- Davis Cup: SF (1905)

Kurt von Wessely, also Curt von Wessely (German pronunciation: [ˈkʊʁt fɔn ˈvɛsəli]; 18 October 1881 – 25 October 1917), was an Austrian tennis player who was active during the beginning of the 20th century.

== Career ==
In July 1905, he played for the Austrian Davis Cup team in a semifinal match against Australasia. The match was played on the grass courts at the Queen's Club, London, England and was won 5–0 by Australasia. Von Wessely lost his singles match against Tony Wilding in four sets and his match against Norman Brookes in three straight sets.

Von Wessely participated in the Wimbledon Championships in 1903 and 1907 and, on both occasions, lost his first-round match. At the time, players defeated in the first or second rounds of the singles competition were entitled to compete for the All England Plate. In 1907, he reached the final of that competition, losing in two straight sets to future four-time Wimbledon champion Anthony Wilding from New Zealand.

In 1901 and 1903, von Wessely reached the singles final at the Austrian Championship, played in Prague, but on both occasions lost in straight sets to Major Ritchie. In 1909, he again reached the singles final and, this time, won the title, defeating compatriot Fritz Pipes in three straight sets.

In August 1904 he reached the challenge round of the German International Championships in Hamburg and was beaten once more by Ritchie, this time in straight sets. In July 1905 Von Wessely won the Franzensbad tournament, through a walkover in the final against his compatriot Rolf Kinzl, and the following Marienbad tournament. In September 1908 he won the singles title of the Championships of the Suisse Romande in Territet. In the final, he defeated R. Norris Williams in three straight sets.

During World War I, he became a lieutenant in the cavalry until a gunshot wound in the arm prevented further active duty. He died on 25 October 1917 in Vienna as a result of complications of this wound.
