= Dezső Lauber =

Hungarian sportsman and architect

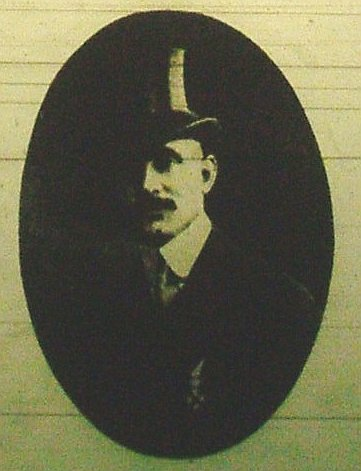
- Dezső Lauber

Medal record

Art competitions

Representing Hungary

Olympic Games
Silver medal – second place	1924 Paris	Town planning

Dezső Lauber (23 May 1879 – 5 September 1966) was a Hungarian all-round sportsman and architect. He was born in Pécs and died in Budapest.

== Career ==
Lauber was an all-round champion athlete in the late 19th and early 20th century, competing in (among others) bobsleigh, ice skating, golf, cycling, and tennis. In that last sport, he competed in the 1908 Summer Olympics in London but lost his first match and was eliminated.

He was an architect by profession and a close associate of 1896 Olympic swimming champion Alfréd Hajós. Together with Hajós, he entered a design for a stadium in the art competitions held during the 1924 Summer Olympics. The jury did not award a gold medal in this competition, but Hajós and Lauber received a silver medal for their design.

Lauber was also secretary of the Hungarian Olympic Committee.
