= Moritz von Bissing (tennis) =

German tennis player

- Country (sports): Germany
- Born: 9 September 1886 Metz, Imperial Territory of Alsace-Lorraine, German Empire
- Died: 18 March 1954 (aged 67) Frankfurt am Main, Hesse, West Germany

Grand Slam singles results
- Wimbledon: 2R (1912)

Other tournaments
- WHCC: 2R (1913)
- Olympic Games: 3R (1908)

Grand Slam doubles results
- Wimbledon: QF (1912)

Other doubles tournaments
- WHCC: W (1913)

Alexander Moritz Reinhold Freiherr von Bissing (9 September 1886 – 18 March 1954) was a German officer as well as tennis, football, rugby, field hockey and golf player. In international circles, because of his German origin, he received the nickname "Fritz".

== Life ==
Moritz was born in Metz where his father, an officer of the Prussian Army, was serving. Later, the family relocated to Frankfurt am Main. After attending school and an apprenticeship, Freiherr von Bissing became a clerk with the Deutsche Bank. At the time, he was already an active athlete. His sporting career began in 1899 on the new tennis courts of the Frankfurt Palmengarten. He began his compulsory military service with the Guard Dragoon Regiment (1st Grand Ducal Hessian) No. 23, where he later became a 2nd Lieutenant of the Reserves and, during WWI, 1st Lieutenant of the Reserves. In the military he met Adolf Wilhelm August Merton, who was the same age as him; they became close friends, and later he would marry Merton's younger sister. 2nd Lieutenant of the Reserves Merton, serving with the Magdeburg Dragoon Regiment No. 6, was killed in action on 30 October 1914 in Le Quesnoy.

He competed in the men's singles event at the 1908 Summer Olympics in London, in 1910, he played in Sydney, Australia. In 1913, he won the doubles title at the World Hard Court Championships partnering compatriot Heinrich Kleinschroth. He had an international tennis career, winning first prize in 141 out of 157 tournaments.

In WWI, Freiherr von Bissing was reactivated with his regiment and served with the 2nd Squadron. In September 1914, he was wounded, in 1915, he was transferred to the High Command of the 10th Army where, on 2 December 1915, he was promoted to 1st Lieutenant of the Reserves. In c. 1916, he was transferred to the General Command of the 14th Reserve Corps, in 1917, he was transferred to the Fliegertruppe as an aerial observer.

In 1918, Moritz Freiherr von Bissing took over as chairman of the club. Under his leadership, tennis was integrated into the club as a separate department, and the name was changed to "Sportclub Frankfurt 1880". The club's development during the "Golden Twenties" is closely linked to his name, as he remained chairman until 1933.

=== World Championships finals ===
==== Doubles: (1 title) ====
Result	Year	Championship	Surface	Partner	Opponents	Score
Win	1913	World Hard Court Championships	Clay	(Germany) Heinrich Kleinschroth	(Germany) Otto Froitzheim (New Zealand) Anthony Wilding	7–5, 0–6, 6–3, 8–6

=== Football Club Frankfurt ===
In 1880, the "Football Club Frankfurt" was founded through the merger of the two rugby teams Germania and Franconia Frankfurt; this club dissolved later in the 1880s. It was re-established in March 1891 under the leadership of the sports figure Herrmann Stasny. The only sport played at that time was still called rugby football (in contrast to association football, which later became football). As part of the 1900 Olympic Games and World's Fair in Paris, a rugby match against France was played for the first time. On 14 October 1900, FC Frankfurt, representing Germany, played against a French team at the Vélodrome de Vincennes. The match ended 27-17 in favor of France. Hockey has been one of the club's sports since 1902. The first recorded hockey match involving the club took place in 1905.

Freiherr von Bissing didn't play tennis at the Football Club Frankfurt, but through his friend Oskar Kreuzer, he already had a connection to the club. As the only German on an English team, he participated in the Football Club Frankfurt's first hockey match. This laid the foundation for the inclusion of field hockey in the club's program. His foresight in promoting hockey is evidenced by the fact that the Silver Shield – the most coveted hockey challenge trophy of the coming decades – was established at his instigation (and donated by his mother).

In 1918, Moritz Freiherr von Bissing took over as chairman of the club. Under his leadership, tennis was integrated into the club as a separate department, and the name was changed to "Sportclub Frankfurt 1880" (SC Frankfurt 1880). The club's development during the "Golden Twenties" is closely linked to his name, as he remained chairman until 1933. Another brother-in-law, metal entrepreneur Alfred Merton (1878–1954), introduced him to the prestigious Frankfurt Golf Club (FGC) and fostered his love for the sport. Merton was chairman of the club from 1932 to 1933.

=== Post-WWII ===
After World War II, he again would become chairman of the SC Frankfurt 1880 from 1947 to 1953. He was also president of the German Golf Association (DGV) from 1949 to 1951. With the release of Friedrichshof Castle, an imperial castle in Kronberg (Taunus), in 1952, which had been occupied by the Americans since 1945, its owner, Wolfgang Prince of Hesse, to whose Hessian line the castle had passed, began converting it into a hotel. At the suggestion of hotelier Richard Pertram and based on designs by golf instructor Ernst Kothe, a 9-hole golf course was laid out in the castle park in 1953. After the owner consulted with Werner Reimers and Ernst Kothe, the founding of a golf club was decided upon the following year. Thus, on 6 January 1954, the founding members Wolfgang Prince of Hesse, Moritz Freiherr von Bissing, Franz Gömöri, Hans Heinrich Hauck, Georg von Opel, Richard Pertram, Werner Reimers, Peter Skeffington, Erich Vierhub, and Gerhard Alois Westrick gathered at the Hessischer Hof hotel in Frankfurt am Main for the official founding of the Kronberg Golf and Country Club. The pitch was playable from spring 1954 onwards, but unfortunately Moritz Freiherr von Bissing would not live to see it.

== Family ==
Moritz was the son of Major General August Friedrich Sigismund Freiherr von Bissing (1842–1918) and his wife (∞ Darmstadt 3 July 1873) Adele Charlotte Robertine, née Freiin van der Capellen van Berkenwoude (1850–1919). On 1 June 1912 in Frankfurt am Main, Moritz Freiherr von Bissing married his Protestant fiancée Eugenie Amalie Essie Gertrud "Gerta" Merton (1894–1968), daughter of prominent and influential German Jewish entrepreneur and philanthropist Wilhelm Ralph Merton (1848–1916) and his wife (∞ Bornheim 1877) Henriette Caroline Emma, née Ladenburg (1859–1939). They would have three children:

- August-Wilhelm Walter Moritz (b. 28 November 1915 in Frankfurt am Main), 2nd Lieutenant of the Wehrmacht, † on 14 April 1943, he rests in the German War Cemetery in Maleme (Crete); final resting place: Block 1, Grave 108.
- Moritz Alexander Gotthard Wulf (b. 27 August 1917 in Frankfurt am Main; d. 11 August 1975 in New Jersey)
- Rosemarie Clotilde Olga Senta (b. 11 June 1919 in Frankfurt am Main; d. 12 June 1979 in New York)
