= Kenneth Powell (tennis) =

British tennis player

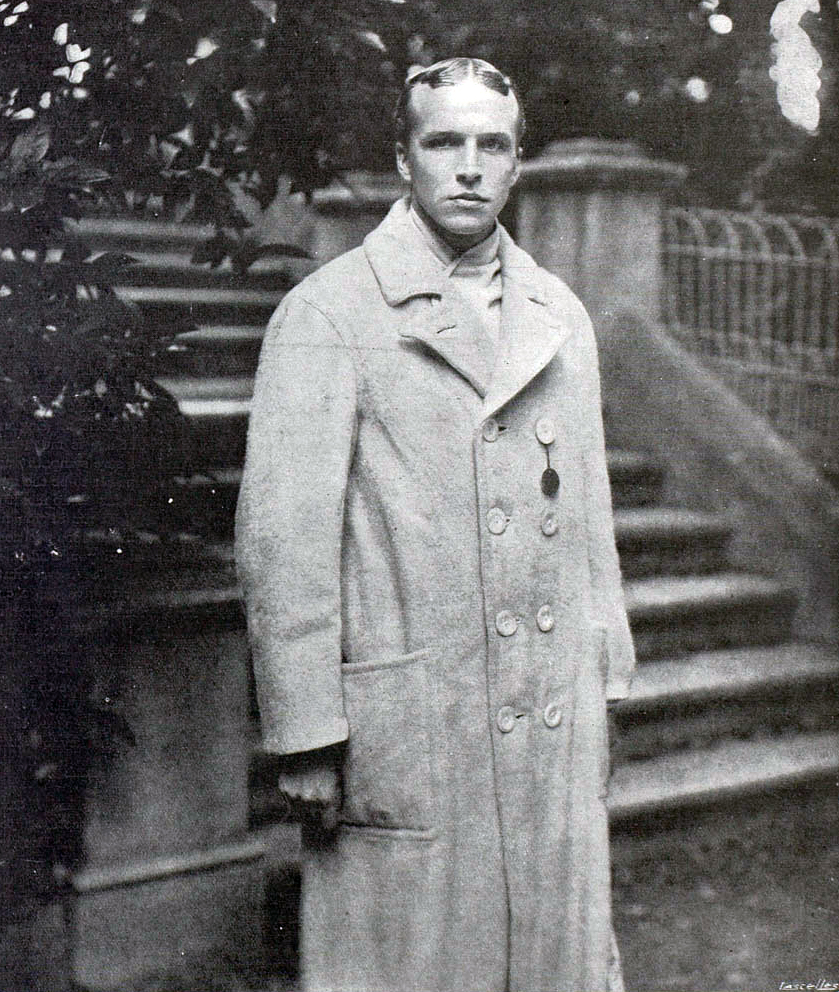
- Kenneth Powell
- Country (sports): British
- Born: 8 April 1885 Hampstead, London
- Died: 18 February 1915 (aged 29) Ypres Salient, Belgium
- Plays: Left-handed

Grand Slam singles results
- Wimbledon: QF (1913)

Other tournaments
- Olympic Games: 1R (1908)

Grand Slam doubles results
- Wimbledon: F (1910)

Other doubles tournaments
- Olympic Games: QF (1908)

Grand Slam mixed doubles results
- Wimbledon: 2R (1913)

Kenneth Powell (8 April 1885 – 18 February 1915) was a British athlete and tennis player who competed in the 1908 and the 1912 Summer Olympics as well as at the Wimbledon Championships.

== Tennis ==
Powell studied at Cambridge University and was a member of the 1905 Cambridge University Lawn Tennis Club which was captained by Tony Wilding. Powell became team captain in 1906 and 1907.

In 1908, he won the singles title at the Queen's Club Championships when his opponent in the final Major Ritchie retired in the second set. That year he also won the Covered Court Championships in Sweden.

Between 1905 and 1913, Powell competed in eight editions of the Wimbledon Championships. In the singles, his best result was achieved during his last visit in 1913 when he defeated one of the favourites CP Dixon in the fourth round in five sets. In the quarterfinal the next day, he lost in four sets to Oskar Kreuzer. In the doubles event, he teamed up with his Canadian namesake Robert Powell. He reached the semifinal of the All-Comers tournament in 1909 and the final in 1910.

At the 1908 Olympic Games in London, he competed in the outdoor tennis singles event but lost his first round match to Otto Froitzheim. In the outdoor tennis doubles, he and his partner Walter Crawley were eliminated in the quarterfinals.

Powell was a left-handed player with a break service, and his main strength was his excellent volley, speed, and agility. His backhand shot was a comparative weakness.

== Athletics ==
Powell was honoured as Victor Ludorum for athletics for two consecutive years for his school. In 1908, Powell participated in the 110 metre hurdles competition at the 1908 Olympic Games but was eliminated in the first round. Powell competed at multiple AAA Championships, finished second in the 120 yards hurdles at the 1909 AAA Championships, third at the 1910 AAA Championships, second at the 1911 AAA Championships and third at the 1912 AAA Championships.

Shortly after the 1912 AAA Championships, he competed for Great Britain in the 110 metre hurdles competition at the 1912 Olympic Games. He also finished second and third respectively at the 1913 and 1914 AAA Championships.

== Other sports ==
Powell was an all-round sportsman who captained the school fifteen at Rugby. He played rackets, reaching the final of the public schools competition in 1903, and was a member of his school gymnastic eight.

== Death ==
On 18 February 1915, Powell was killed in action during the First World War, serving as a private with the Honourable Artillery Company, when he was struck by a bullet near Ypres. He is buried in the Commonwealth War Graves section of the churchyard at Loker.

== See also ==
- List of Olympians killed in World War I
