= Bohuslav Hykš =

Czech tennis player

- Born: 7 May 1889 Prague, Austria-Hungary

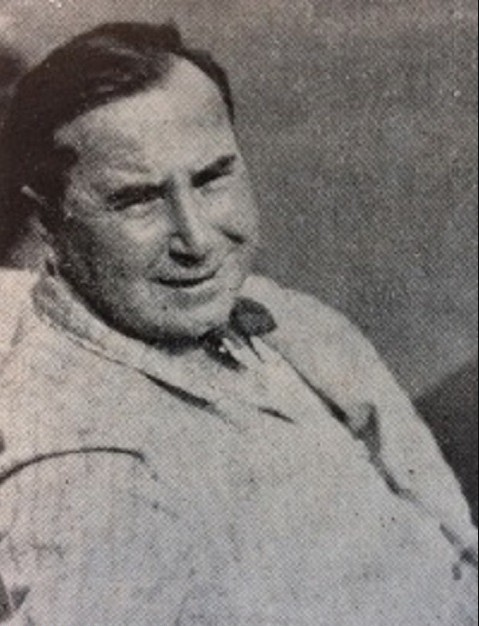
Bohuslav Hykš

Bohuslav Hykš (born 7 May 1889, date of death unknown) was a Czech tennis player. He competed for Bohemia at the 1908 and 1912 Summer Olympics and for Czechoslovakia at the 1920 Summer Olympics.
