= Vancouver Lawn Tennis & Badminton Club =

Sports club in Vancouver, British Columbia

Coordinates: 49.257614°N 123.142573°W

- Formerly: Vancouver Lawn Tennis Club (1897–1927)
- Founded: 2 October 1897
- Headquarters: 1630 W 15th Avenue, Vancouver, British Columbia
- Website: vanlawn.com

The Vancouver Lawn Tennis & Badminton Club is a racquet club located at Granville Park in the upmarket neighborhood of Fairview in Vancouver, British Columbia, Canada.

== History ==
Founded in 1887, in the 1890s and early 1900s, the club was the first racquets club in the city and became of the more fashionable hotspots, attracting the city elite to play at the club. The club hosted the annual Vancouver Lawn Tennis Club Championship, attracting big name players such as Bernie Schwengers who won there in 1900 and twice in 1906 in the singles and doubles.

One of the earliest presidents was a man named Abbott who was also president both of the Vancouver Boating Club (predecessor of the Vancouver Yacht Club) in 1889.

== Facilities ==
As of 2011, the club has 16 tennis courts (eight indoor), six badminton courts and four squash courts. It is a member of the prestigious International Associate Clubs (IAC).
