= Rolf Kinzl =

Austrian tennis player (1878–1938)

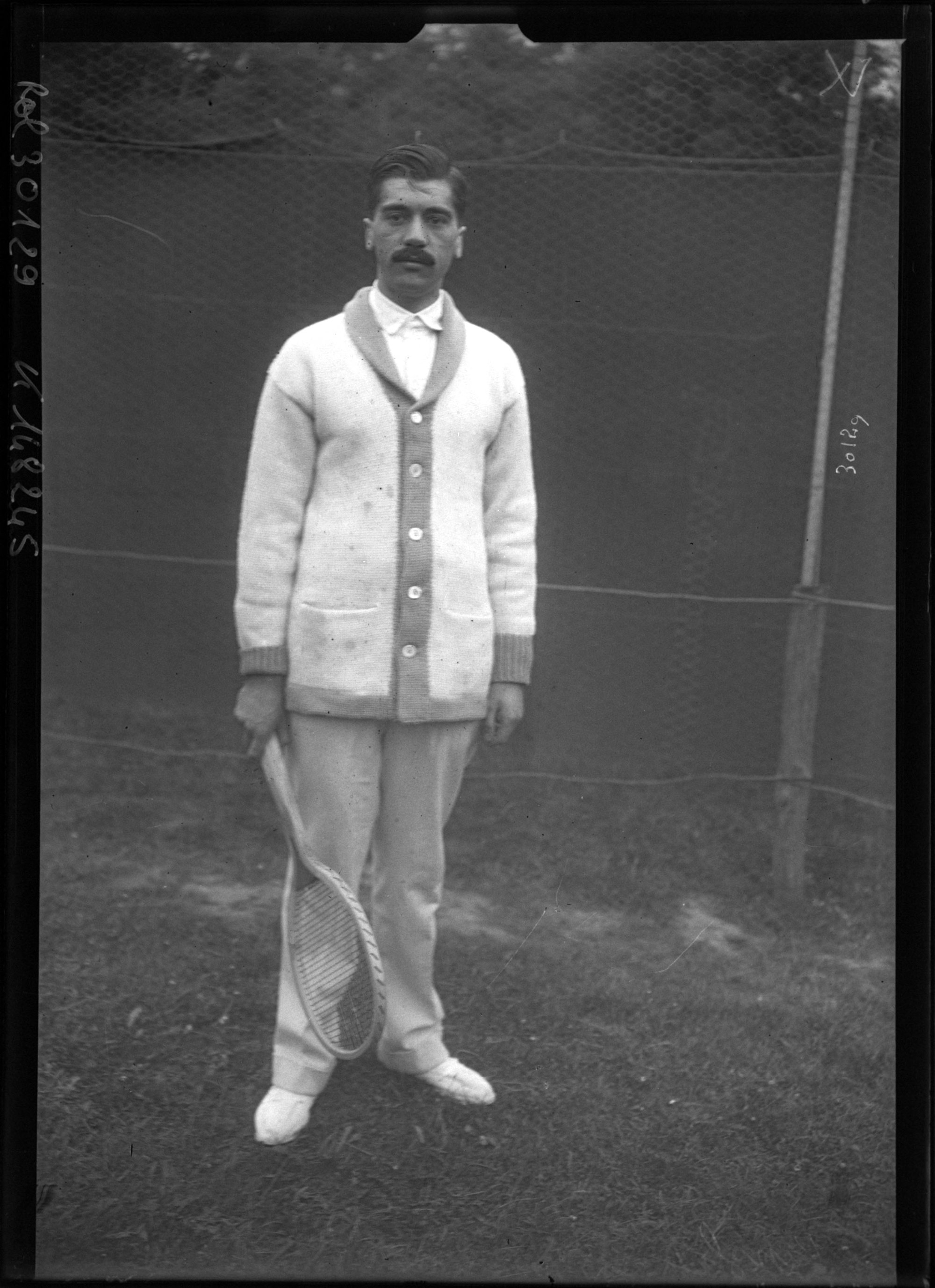
- Kinzl at the 1913 WHCC
- Country (sports): Austria
- Born: 19 October 1878 Prague, Austria-Hungary
- Died: 14 November 1938 (aged 60) Vienna, Third Reich
- Turned pro: 1897 (amateur tour)
- Retired: 1927
- Plays: Right-handed

Singles

Grand Slam singles results
- Wimbledon: 3R (1907)

Other tournaments
- WHCC: 1R (1913)
- Olympic Games: 1R (1908)

Doubles

Other doubles tournaments
- WHCC: SF (1913)

Rolf Kinzl, (German pronunciation: [ʀɔlf kɪnʦl]; 19 October 1878 – 14 November 1938) was an Austrian tennis player, football player, and cyclist who was active during the beginning of the 20th century.

== Tennis career ==
In 1898 he reached the final of the Austrian Championship but lost in four sets to Jorge André. In 1901 he won the Adriatic Championships in Triest in a three-set match. His opponent in the final had been Miklós Horthy who later became the Regent of Hungary.

In 1903 he won the international tournament of the Magyar Athletikai Club in Budapest with a victory over Josiah Ritchie. With his compatriot Kurt von Wessely he celebrated his first important doubles title in the German International Championships. In 1904 he was defeated in the semifinals of the Austrian Championship by Josiah Ritchie in straight sets. He and von Wessely also lost the doubles final to Herbert Roper-Barrett and B.W. Frost.

Kinzl played for the Austrian Davis Cup team during the 1905 World Group semifinal against Australasia. He lost both his singles matches against Norman Brookes and Anthony Wilding as well as the doubles match with his partner Kurt von Wessely. His best result at a Grand Slam tournament was reaching the third round at the 1907 Wimbledon Championships. In 1907, he was the finalist of the Budapest International Doubles Championships partnering von Wessely but eventually lost it to Tony Wilding and Oscar Kreuzer.

In May 1908, he was runner-up at the Wiesbaden Cup, having lost the final in straight sets to Anthony Wilding. In July, he participated in the singles event at the Summer Olympics but lost in the first round to Wilberforce Eaves. In 1912 he clinched the title of the inaugural Academic Sports Association international tournament in Wawel.

In 1913 he captured his second German International Championships doubles trophy in Hamburg alongside von Wessely. The same year they reached the semifinals of the World Hard Court Championships.

== Other ==
In football, he played as the center-forward of the DFC Prague. He was an occasional football referee as well.

In civil life he was an editor-in-chief for a sport magazine called Wiener Sporttagblattes.

He died in Vienna on 14 November 1938 of a sudden heart attack.
