= Robert Powell (tennis) =

Canadian tennis player

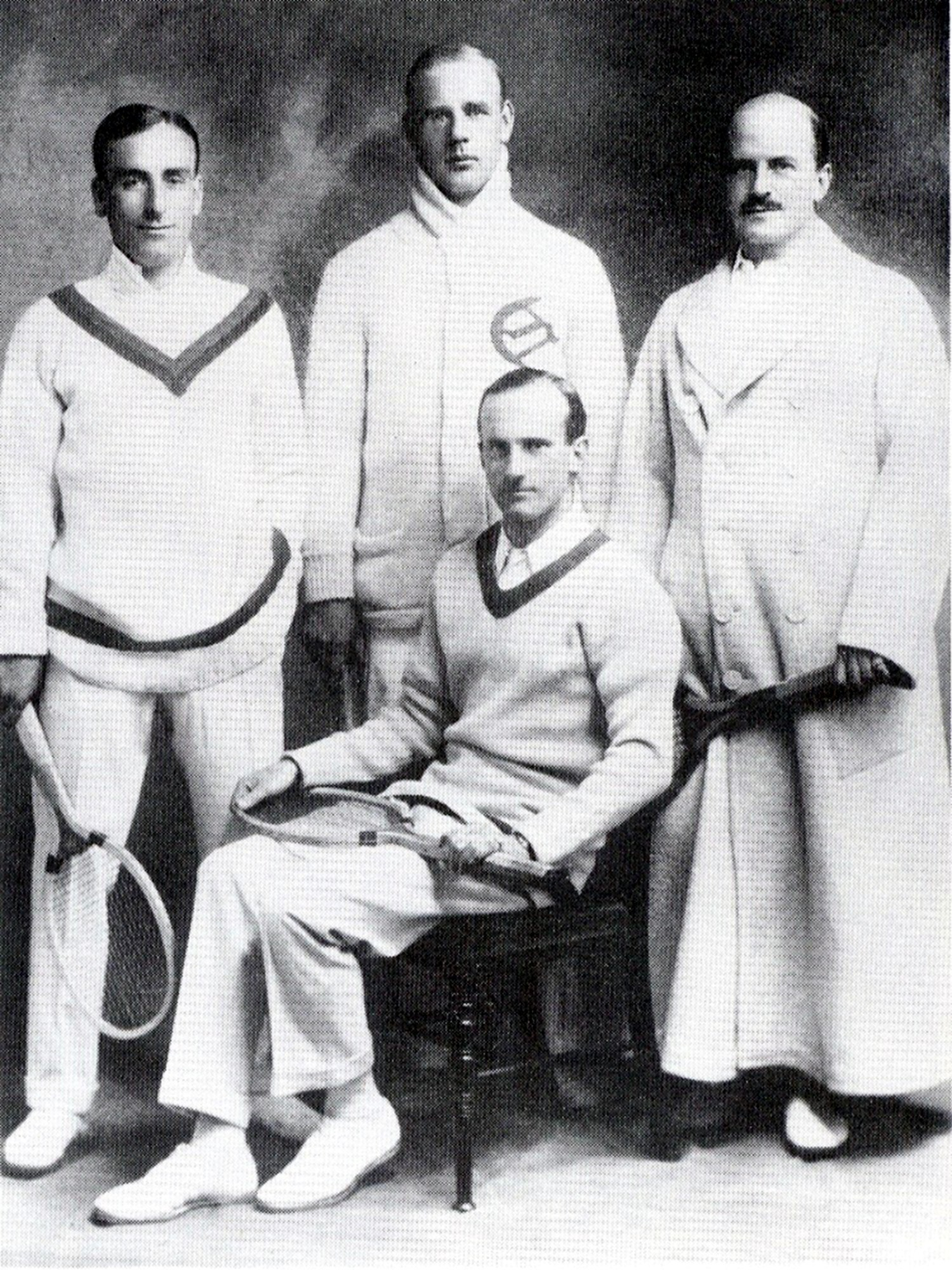
- Robert Powell (seated) – playing captain of the 1913 Canadian Davis Cup Team
- Full name: Robert Branks Powell
- Country (sports): Canada
- Born: 11 April 1881 Victoria, British Columbia, Canada
- Died: 28 April 1917 (aged 36) Vimy Ridge, France
- Plays: Left-handed (one-handed backhand)

Singles
- Career record: 132-57
- Career titles: 12

Grand Slam singles results
- Wimbledon: SF (1908)

Doubles

Grand Slam doubles results
- Wimbledon: F (1909)

Team competitions
- Davis Cup: F (1913)

Robert Branks 'Bobby' Powell (11 April 1881 – 28 April 1917) was a male tennis player from Canada.

== Biography ==
In 1904 Powell was the founder of the North Pacific International Lawn Tennis Association. He won several singles titles including the 1901 Western Canadian and Pacific Northwest in Tacoma, the 1903 British Columbia Championships and the 1904 Oregon State title 1904.

From 1900 to 1904 he was the private secretary to the Lieutenant Governor of British Columbia Henri-Gustave Joly de Lotbinière.

Powell reached the semifinal of the 1908 Wimbledon Championships in which he lost to the eventual champion Arthur Gore in straight sets. In 1909 he won the All England Plate at Wimbledon, a competition and prize introduced for players who had lost in the first or second round of the singles.

In July 1908 Powell won the singles and doubles title of the Scottish Lawn Tennis Championships, defeating Douglas Kitching, who would reach the fourth round at Wimbledon the following season, in the singles final.

Powell won the 1909 Sussex Championships on grass at Brighton, defeating A. Wallis Myers, Charles Tuckey (husband of Agnes Tuckey), Henry Carson, and Alfred Ingram in the six-round event.

In 1909 Powell won the Northern Lawn Tennis Championships in Manchester, defeating Ernest Charlton (a later champion of this event in 1924 at age 42) in the semifinal and Theodore Mavrogordato, ranked world No. 9 in 1914 and later a twice winner of the event, in the final.

In 1909, Powell won the Carlisle Championships, defeating John C. S. Rendall, a later professional tennis champion, in the semifinal and Alexander Mackay, Lord Mackay, the multiple Scottish champion, in the final. Powell successfully defended his Carlisle title the following year.

He participated in the 1908 Summer Olympics in London, where he captained Canada's tennis delegation and placed joint-ninth in the singles tournament and, alongside compatriot James Foulkes, joint-seventh in the doubles competition.

At the 1910 Wimbledon Championships he reached the All-Comers final of the men's doubles competition partnering Kenneth Powell. They lost in three straight sets to eventual champions Major Ritchie and Anthony Wilding.

Powell won the Scottish Lawn Tennis Championships singles title a second time in 2010, defeating Belgian champion A. Georges Watson in the singles final.

In July 1910 Powell competed in the Surrey Championships, defeating Stanley Doust, a world No. 8 and multiple state championships winner from Australia, and reaching the final in which he was defeated in four sets by Major Ritchie.

In 1913 and 1914 he played in four ties for the Canadian Davis Cup team. The best team result was reaching the Challenge Round in the 1913 against the US at Wimbledon. This was the best performance of a Canadian Davis Cup team before the Canadian Davis Cup runner-up and win in 2021 and 2022. That Davis Cup team has been inducted into the Greater Victoria Sports Hall of Fame in 2008. Powell had a Davis Cup match record of 4 wins vs. 5 losses.

Tennis author and journalist A. Wallis Myers described Powell in his book Twenty Years of Lawn Tennis as "A sound player, using a left arm and a resourceful brain to deceive his opponent, one of the best lobbers I have ever known, an intrepid poacher and a fast sprinter..".

Powell enlisted in the Forty-Eighth Canadian Battalion of the Canadian Infantry in World War I and reached the rank of Lieutenant. He was killed in action in France during the Battle of Vimy Ridge on 28 April 1917, perhaps the most famous military victory in Canadian history.

In 1993 he was inducted into the Canadian Tennis Hall of fame followed in 2000 by his induction into the USTA Pacific Northwest Hall of Fame. Powell was later inducted into the Canada's Sports Hall of Fame in 2015.

== See also ==
- List of Olympians killed in World War I
