= Charles P. Dixon =

British tennis player

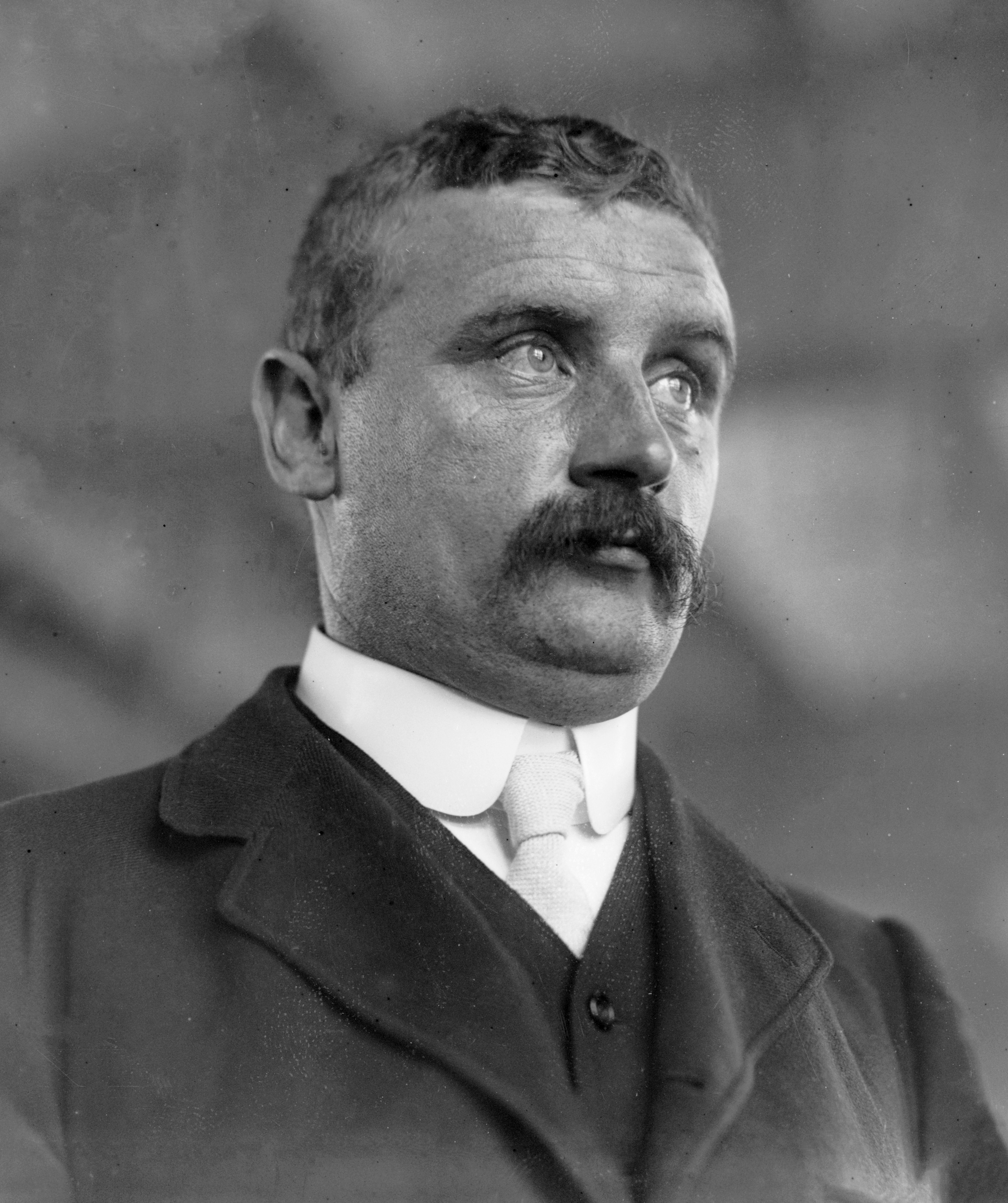
- Full name: Charles Percy Dixon
- Country (sports): United Kingdom
- Born: 7 February 1873; Grantham, England
- Died: 7 April 1939 (aged 66); London, England

Singles
- Career record: 303/99 (75.38%)
- Career titles: 34
- Highest ranking: No. 6 (1913, A. Wallis Myers)

Grand Slam singles results
- Australian Open: QF (1912)
- Wimbledon: F (1901^{AC}, 1911^{AC})

Doubles

Grand Slam doubles results
- Australian Open: W (1912)
- Wimbledon: W (1912, 1913)

Team competitions
- Davis Cup: W (1912)
Medal record
Olympic Games
Gold medal – first place	1912 Stockholm	Indoor mixed doubles
Silver medal – second place	1912 Stockholm	Indoor singles
Bronze medal – third place	1908 London	Doubles
Bronze medal – third place	1912 Stockholm	Indoor doubles

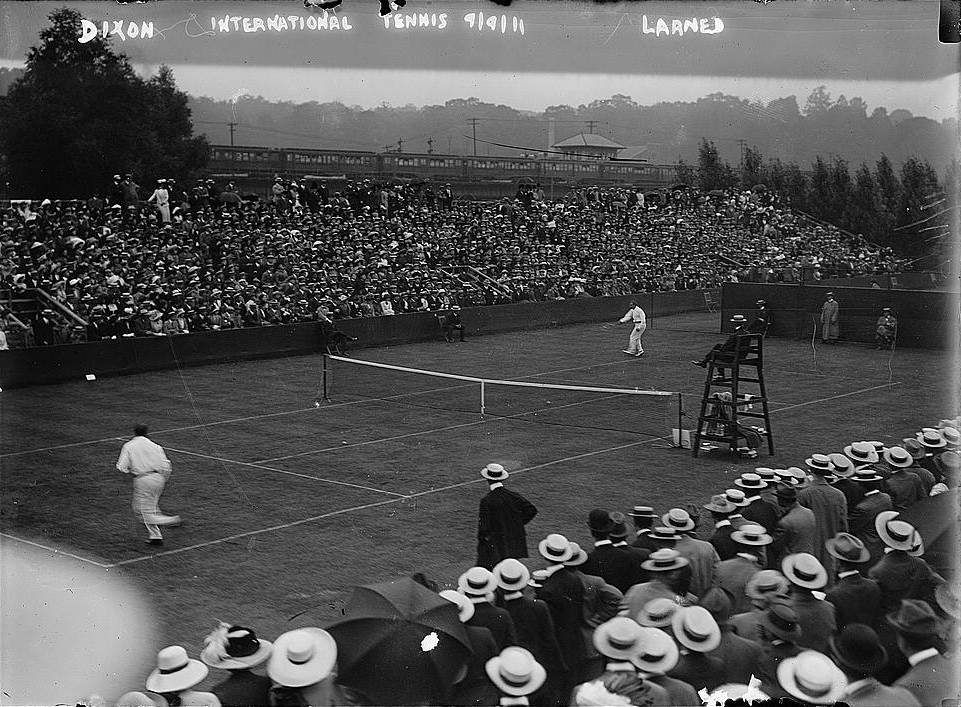
Charles Dixon vs. Bill Larned on 9 September 1911 at The Championships, Wimbledon

Charles Percy Dixon (7 February 1873 – 29 April 1939) was a male tennis player from Great Britain. He was a four-time Olympic medallist and led a successful British team to victory in the Davis Cup.

== Biography ==
Dixon was born on 7 February 1873 in Grantham, Lincolnshire. He won a bronze medal in the men's doubles event at the 1908 Summer Olympics in London. In the 1912 Summer Olympics, he won three medals in the indoor tennis events: gold in the mixed doubles, silver in men's singles, and bronze in men's doubles.

From 1929 to 1932, he represented the International Club of Great Britain against France at Queens and at Auteuil in 1932 and 1933. After retiring from tournaments, he coached juniors and umpired at Wimbledon, becoming President of the Umpire's Association. He died on 29 April 1939.

== Tennis tournaments ==
Dixon was born in 1873, the year that Major Walter Clopton Wingfield defined the first rules for lawn tennis. Dixon reached his first all comers final at Wimbledon in 1901, beating Harold Mahony before losing to Arthur Gore. A decade later, in 1911, Dixon reached the all comers final again, beating Major Ritchie and Max Decugis before losing to Herbert Roper Barrett. He won the doubles with Roper Barrett in 1912 and 1913.

His career included victories in international tournaments overseas include the Ostend International tournament (1905), the Doubles at the Championship of Dieppe (Championnat de Diepper) (1908) won partnering with M.J.G. Ritchie In the UK he won the Surrey Championships (1911) on grass, defeating Anthony Wilding in four sets.

He also won the Dulwich Farm Hard Courts on clay at Dulwich four times from (1909–1910, 1912–1913). He also won the Drive Club Tournament at the Drive Club, Fulham that was played on hard cement courts three times (1908-1910).

Dixon was better known at the time for his many successes when representing Britain in the Davis Cup, starting in the 1909 Cup in Philadelphia, he led the British team to victory in the 1912 Cup in Australia. He was also a member of the English Drive Club team in South Africa in 1910–1911.

He won the 1913 Doubles title at the Russian Open Tennis Championship, partnering Albert D Prebble, and was runner up in the singles.

== Grand Slam finals ==
=== Doubles (3 titles, 1 runner-ups) ===
Result	Year	Championship	Surface	Partner	Opponents	Score
Win	1912	Wimbledon	Grass	(United Kingdom of Great Britain and Ireland) Herbert Roper Barrett	(France) Max Decugis (France) André Gobert	3–6, 6–3, 6–4, 7–5
Win	1912	Australasian Championships	Grass	(Ireland) James Cecil Parke	(United Kingdom) Alfred Beamish (United Kingdom) Gordon Lowe	6–4, 6–4, 6–2
Win	1913	Wimbledon	Grass	(United Kingdom of Great Britain and Ireland) Herbert Roper Barrett	(Germany) Heinrich Kleinschroth (Germany) Friedrich Wilhelm Rahe	6–2, 6–4, 4–6, 6–2
Loss	1914	Wimbledon	Grass	(United Kingdom of Great Britain and Ireland) Herbert Roper Barrett	(Australia) Norman Brookes (Australia) Anthony Wilding	1–6, 1–6, 7–5, 6–8
