= Tennis at the 1912 Summer Olympics – Men's outdoor singles =

Olympic tennis event

Men's outdoor singles tennis at the Games of the V Olympiad
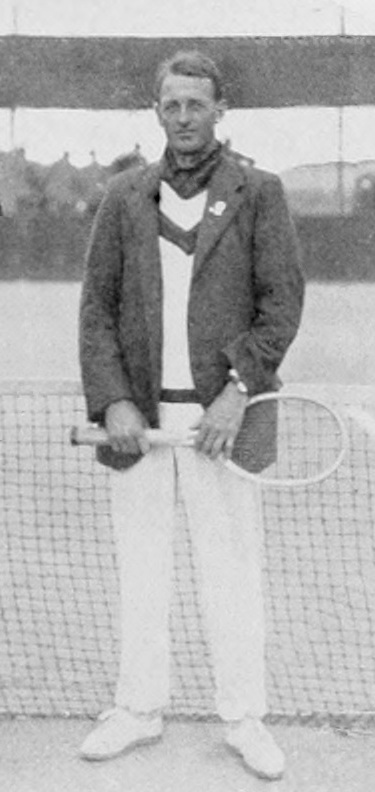
- Charles Winslow
- Venue: Östermalms IP
- Dates: 28 June – 5 July 1912
- Competitors: 49 from 12 nations

Medalists
| 1st place, gold medalist(s) | | Charles Winslow; South Africa |
| 2nd place, silver medalist(s) | | Harold Kitson; South Africa |
| 3rd place, bronze medalist(s) | | Oscar Kreuzer; Germany |

Men's outdoor singles
- Tennis at the 1912 Summer Olympics

Events
Outdoor
| Singles | men | women |
| Doubles | men | | mixed |
Indoor
| Singles | men | women |
| Doubles | men | | mixed |
- Summer Olympics

The (outdoor) men's singles competition at the 1912 Summer Olympics was part of the tennis program for the games. There were 49 competitors from 12 nations. Nations were limited to 8 players each. The event was won by Charles Winslow in an all-South African final over Harold Kitson; they were the nation's first medals in the men's singles. Oscar Kreuzer of Germany won the bronze-medal match against Bohemian Ladislav Žemla.

== Background ==
This was the fifth appearance of the men's singles tennis. The event has been held at every Summer Olympics where tennis has been on the program: from 1896 to 1924 and then from 1988 to the current program. Demonstration events were held in 1968 and 1984. 1912 was the second and last time an indoor version was held concurrently.

The 1908 Official Report's recommendation to schedule Olympic tennis not so close to Wimbledon was not acted upon; indeed, the scheduling issue was worse in 1912. Rather than starting three days after the end of Wimbledon, the Olympic outdoor tennis events were now at the same time as Wimbledon. The indoor events, held in May, were thus attended by top-flight players, while the outdoor competitions were not.

Denmark, Norway, Russia, and Sweden each made their debut in the event. France and Germany both made their fourth appearance, tied for most among all nations.

== Competition format ==
The competition was a single-elimination tournament with a bronze-medal match. All matches were best-of-five sets.

== Schedule ==
The tournament was beset by withdrawals; there were 67 entries, necessitating drawing up a bracket for seven rounds, but only 49 men actually started.

| Date | Time | Round |
|---|---|---|
| Friday, 28 June 1912 | | Round of 128; Round of 64 |
| Saturday, 29 June 1912 | | Round of 128; Round of 64; Round of 32 |
| Sunday, 30 June 1912 | | Round of 64; Round of 32 |
| Monday, 1 July 1912 | | Round of 32; Round of 16 |
| Tuesday, 2 July 1912 | | Quarterfinals |
| Wednesday, 3 July 1912 | | Quarterfinals; Semifinals |
| Thursday, 4 July 1912 | | Semifinals; Bronze medal match |
| Friday, 5 July 1912 | | Final |

== Draw ==
Key

- Q = Qualifier
- WC = Wild card
- LL = Lucky loser
- Alt = Alternate
- ITF = ITF entry
- PR = Protected ranking
- SR = Special ranking
- SE = Special exempt
- JE = Junior exempt
- JR = Junior Accelerator Programme entrant
- CO = College Accelerator Programme entrant
- NG = Next Gen Accelerator Program entrant
- w/o = Walkover
- r = Retired
- d = Defaulted

=== Finals ===
Quarterfinals
Harold Kitson (RSA) | 6 | 6 | 6
Ludwig Salm (AUT) | 2 | 2 | 4
Otto von Müller (GER) | 4 | 5 | 4
Ladislav Žemla (BOH) | 6 | 7 | 6
Charles Winslow (RSA) | 6 | 6 | 8 | 4 | 6
Luis Heyden (GER) | 2 | 4 | 10 | 6 | 3
Arthur Zborzil (AUT) | 4 | 3 | 2
Oscar Kreuzer (GER) | 6 | 6 | 6

Semifinals
Harold Kitson (RSA) | 2 | 6 | 6 | 4 | 6
Ladislav Žemla (BOH) | 6 | 3 | 2 | 6 | 3
Charles Winslow (RSA) | 9 | 7 | 6
Oscar Kreuzer (GER) | 7 | 5 | 2

Final (gold-medal match)
Harold Kitson (RSA) | 5 | 6 | 8 | 6
Charles Winslow (RSA) | 7 | 4 | 10 | 8
Bronze-medal match
Ladislav Žemla (BOH) | 2 | 6 | 3 | 1
Oscar Kreuzer (GER) | 6 | 3 | 6 | 6

=== Top half ===
==== Section 1 ====
First round

Second round
H Leffler (SWE) | 2 | 1 | 0
H Kitson (RSA) | 6 | 6 | 6
F Möller (SWE)
J-P Samazeuilh (FRA) | w/o
R Spiess (GER) | 2 | 6 | 3 | 6 | 6
J Just (BOH) | 6 | 3 | 6 | 3 | 1
H Schomburgk (GER)
J Montariol (FRA) | w/o

Third round
H Kitson (RSA) | 6 | 6 | 6
F Möller (SWE) | 2 | 2 | 3
R Spiess (GER) | 6 | 1 | 1
H Schomburgk (GER) | 8 | 6 | 4

Fourth round
H Kitson (RSA) | 6 | 6 | 6
H Schomburgk (GER) | 2 | 2 | 3

==== Section 2 ====
First round

Second round
W Boström (SWE) | 6 | 6 | 6
T Smith (NOR) | 2 | 4 | 1
R Peterson (NOR) | 1 | 5 | 3
L Salm (AUT) | 6 | 7 | 6
J Zeman (BOH) | 1 | 0 | 0
C Wennergren (SWE) | 6 | 6 | 6
L Rovsing (DEN)
P Segner (HUN) | w/o

Third round
W Boström (SWE) | 5 | 4 | 1
L Salm (AUT) | 7 | 6 | 6
C Wennergren (SWE) | 4 | 9 | 6 | 6 | 6
L Rovsing (DEN) | 6 | 7 | 8 | 1 | 1

Fourth round
L Salm (AUT) | 6 | 5 | 7 | 6
C Wennergren (SWE) | 3 | 7 | 5 | 1

==== Section 3 ====
First round

Second round
V Hansen (DEN)
Ö Schmid (HUN) | w/o
C Kempe (SWE) | w/o
B von Kehrling (HUN)
J Zsigmondy (HUN)
H Liebisch (AUT) | w/o
O von Müller (GER) | 6 | 6 | 6
O Frederiksen (DEN) | 2 | 1 | 4

Third round
V Hansen (DEN) | 2 | 1 | 8 | 4
B von Kehrling (HUN) | 6 | 6 | 6 | 6
J Zsigmondy (HUN) | 1 | 2 | 0
O von Müller (GER) | 6 | 6 | 6

Fourth round
B von Kehrling (HUN) | 2 | 1 | 1
O von Müller (GER) | 6 | 6 | 6

==== Section 4 ====
First round
J Kodl (BOH) | 4 | 1 | 2
L Tapscott (RSA) | 6 | 6 | 6
F Pipes (AUT) | 6 | 6 | 6
O Lindpaintner (GER) | 2 | 3 | 3

Second round
H Planner von Plaun (AUT) | w/o
R Bertrand (AUT)
A Hammacher (GER) | w/o
L Žemla (BOH)
F Blanchy (FRA) | 5 | 6 | 6 | 6
B Hykš (BOH) | 7 | 1 | 2 | 1
L Tapscott (RSA) | 3 | 7 | 4 | 7 | 7
F Pipes (AUT) | 6 | 5 | 6 | 5 | 5

Third round
R Bertrand (AUT) | w/o
L Žemla (BOH)
F Blanchy (FRA) | 6 | 7 | 3 | 4 | 4
L Tapscott (RSA) | 1 | 5 | 6 | 6 | 6

Fourth round
L Žemla (BOH) | 1 | 4 | 6 | 6 | 6
L Tapscott (RSA) | 6 | 6 | 2 | 4 | 2

=== Bottom half ===
==== Section 5 ====
First round
A Thayssen (DEN)
K Ardelt (BOH) | w/o

Second round
A Thayssen (DEN) | 6 | 6 | 3 | 6
A Madsen (DEN) | 1 | 3 | 6 | 3
C Winslow (RSA) | 7 | 6 | 6
E Frigast (DEN) | 5 | 2 | 3
T Grönfors (SWE)
E Tóth (HUN) | w/o
J Arenholt (DEN) | 2 | 6 | 0 | 4
V Ingerslev (DEN) | 6 | 1 | 6 | 6

Third round
A Thayssen (DEN) | 4 | 6 | 4 | 4
C Winslow (RSA) | 6 | 3 | 6 | 6
T Grönfors (SWE) | 1 | 2 | 2
V Ingerslev (DEN) | 6 | 6 | 6

Fourth round
C Winslow (RSA) | 6 | 8 | 6
V Ingerslev (DEN) | 4 | 6 | 4

==== Section 6 ====
First round

Second round
É Mény de Marangue (FRA) | 9 | 6 | 2 | 5 | 1
L Heyden (GER) | 7 | 4 | 6 | 7 | 6
L von Baráth (HUN) | 1 | 3 | 4
A von Kelemen (HUN) | 6 | 6 | 6
A Canet (FRA) | 6 | 6 | 6
C Langaard (NOR) | 3 | 0 | 1
P Gyula (HUN)
T Pell (USA) | w/o

Third round
L Heyden (GER) | 6 | 4 | 7 | 7
A Kelemen (HUN) | 3 | 6 | 5 | 5
A Canet (FRA) | 2 | 3 | 4
T Pell (USA) | 6 | 6 | 6

Fourth round
L Heyden (GER) | 2 | 7 | 8 | 7
T Pell (USA) | 6 | 5 | 6 | 5

==== Section 7 ====
First round

Second round
W Stibolt (NOR)
D Lawton (FRA) | w/o
J Šebek (BOH)
O Froitzheim (GER) | w/o
K von Wessely (AUT) | w/o
K Robětín (BOH)
A Zborzil (AUT) | 6 | 6 | 1 | 6
C Benckert (SWE) | 2 | 4 | 6 | 3

Third round
W Stibolt (NOR) | 1 | 3 | 0
J Šebek (BOH) | 6 | 6 | 6
K Robětín (BOH) | 4 | 2 | 1
A Zborzil (AUT) | 6 | 6 | 6

Fourth round
J Šebek (BOH) | 1 | 0 | 6 | 2
A Zborzil (AUT) | 6 | 6 | 3 | 6

==== Section 8 ====
First round

Second round
O Blom (NED) | 3 | 3 | 6
G Setterwall (SWE) | 6 | 6 | 8
M Sumarokov (RUS)
A Alenitsyn (RUS) | w/o
O Relly (AUT) | w/o
B Angell (NOR)
O Kreuzer (GER) | 6 | 6 | 6
H Bjørklund (NOR) | 0 | 0 | 1

Third round
G Setterwall (SWE) | 2 | 3 | 13 | 2
M Sumarokov (RUS) | 6 | 6 | 11 | 6
B Angell (NOR) | w/o
O Kreuzer (GER)

Fourth round
M Sumarokov (RUS) | 2 | 12 | 4 | 0
O Kreuzer (GER) | 6 | 10 | 6 | 6

== Results summary ==
| Rank | Player | Nation | Round of 128 | Round of 64 | Round of 32 | Round of 16 | Quarterfinals | Semifinals | Final |
|---|---|---|---|---|---|---|---|---|---|
| 1st place, gold medalist(s) | Charles Winslow | South Africa | Bye | E Frigast (DEN); W 7–5, 6–2, 6–3 | A Thayssen (DEN); W 6–4, 3–6, 6–4, 6–4 | V Ingerslev (DEN); W 6–4, 8–6, 6–4 | L Heyden (GER); W 6–2, 6–4, 8–10, 4–6, 6–3 | O Kreuzer (GER); W 9–7, 7–5, 6–2 | H Kitson (RSA); W 7–5, 4–6, 10–8, 8–6 |
| 2nd place, silver medalist(s) | Harold Kitson | South Africa | Bye | H Leffler (SWE); W 6–2, 6–1, 6–0 | F Möller (SWE); W 6–2, 6–2, 6–3 | H Schomburgk (GER); W 6–2, 6–2, 6–3 | L Salm (AUT); W 6–2, 6–2, 6–4 | L Žemla (BOH); W 2–6, 6–3, 6–2, 4–6, 6–3 | C Winslow (RSA); L 7–5, 4–6, 10–8, 8–6 |
| 3rd place, bronze medalist(s) | Oscar Kreuzer | Germany | Bye | H Bjørklund (NOR); W 6–0, 6–0, 6–1 | B Angell (NOR); W w/o | M Sumarokov (RUS); W 6–2, 2–4, 6–4, 6–0 | A Zborzil (AUT); W 6–4, 6–3, 6–2 | C Winslow (RSA); L 9–7, 7–5, 6–2 | L Žemla (BOH); W 6–2, 3–6, 6–3, 6–1 |
| 4 | Ladislav Žemla | Bohemia | Bye | A Hammacher (GER); W w/o | R Bertrand (AUT); W w/o | L Tapscott (RSA); W 6–1, 6–4, 2–6, 4–6, 6–2 | O von Müller (GER); W 6–4, 7–5, 6–4 | H Kitson (RSA); L 2–6, 6–3, 6–2, 4–6, 6–3 | O Kreuzer (GER); L 6–2, 3–6, 6–3, 6–1 |
| 5 | Luis Maria Heyden | Germany | Bye | É Mény de Marangue (FRA); W 7–9, 4–6, 6–2, 7–5, 6–1 | A Kelemen (HUN); W 6–3, 4–6, 7–5, 7–5 | T Pell (USA); W 2–6, 7–5, 8–6, 7–5 | C Winslow (RSA); L 6–2, 6–4, 8–10, 4–6, 6–3 | did not advance | |
| 5 | Otto von Müller | Germany | Bye | O Frederiksen (DEN); W 6–2, 6–1, 6–4 | J Zsigmondy (HUN); W 6–1, 6–2, 6–0 | B von Kehrling (HUN); W 6–2, 6–1, 6–1 | L Žemla (BOH); L 6–4, 7–5, 6–4 | did not advance | |
| 5 | Ludwig von Salm-Hoogstraeten | Austria | Bye | R Peterson (NOR); W 6–1, 7–5, 6–3 | W Boström (SWE); W 7–5, 6–4, 6–1 | C Wennergren (SWE); W 6–3, 5–7, 7–5, 6–1 | H Kitson (RSA); L 6–2, 6–2, 6–4 | did not advance | |
| 5 | Arthur Zborzil | Austria | Bye | C Benckert (SWE); W 6–2, 6–4, 1–6, 6–3 | K Robětín (BOH); W 6–4, 6–2, 6–1 | J Šebek (BOH); W 6–1, 6–0, 3–6, 6–2 | O Kreuzer (GER); L 6–4, 6–3, 6–2 | did not advance | |
| 9 | Vagn Ingerslev | Denmark | Bye | J Arenholt (DEN); W 6–2, 1–6, 6–0, 6–4 | T Grönfors (SWE); W 6–1, 6–2, 6–2 | C Winslow (RSA); L 6–4, 8–6, 6–4 | did not advance | | |
| 9 | Béla von Kehrling | Hungary | Bye | C Kempe (SWE); W w/o | V Hansen (DEN); W 6–2, 6–1, 6–8, 6–4 | O von Müller (GER); L 6–2, 6–1, 6–1 | did not advance | | |
| 9 | Theodore Pell | United States | Bye | P Gyula (HUN); W w/o | A Canet (FRA); W 6–2, 6–3, 6–4 | L Heyden (GER); L 2–6, 7–5, 8–6, 7–5 | did not advance | | |
| 9 | Heinrich Schomburgk | Germany | Bye | J Montariol (FRA); W w/o | R Spiess (GER); W 8–6, 6–1, 6–4 | H Kitson (RSA); L 6–2, 6–2, 6–3 | did not advance | | |
| 9 | Josef Šebek | Bohemia | Bye | O Froitzheim (SWE); W w/o | W Stibolt (NOR); W 6–1, 6–3, 6–0 | A Zborzil (AUT); L 6–1, 6–0, 3–6, 6–2 | did not advance | | |
| 9 | Mikhail Sumarokov-Elston | Russia | Bye | A Alenitsyn (RUS); W w/o | G Setterwall (SWE); W 6–2, 6–3, 3–5, 6–2 | O Kreuzer (GER); L 6–2, 2–4, 6–4, 6–0 | did not advance | | |
| 9 | Lionel Tapscott | South Africa | J Kodl (BOH); W 6–4, 6–1, 6–2 | F Pipes (AUT); W 3–6, 7–5, 4–6, 7–5, 7–5 | F Blanchy (FRA); W 1–6, 5–7, 6–3, 6–4, 6–4 | L Žemla (BOH); L 6–1, 6–4, 2–6, 4–6, 6–2 | did not advance | | |
| 9 | Charles Wennergren | Sweden | Bye | J Zeman (BOH); W 6–1, 6–0, 6–0 | L Rovsing (DEN); W 4–6, 9–7, 6–8, 6–1, 6–1 | L Salm (AUT); L 6–3, 5–7, 7–5, 6–1 | did not advance | | |
| 17 | François Blanchy | France | Bye | B Hykš (BOH); W 5–7, 6–1, 6–2, 6–1 | L Tapscott (RSA); L 1–6, 5–7, 6–3, 6–4, 6–4 | did not advance | | | |
| 17 | Wollmar Boström | Sweden | Bye | T Smith (NOR); W 6–2, 6–4, 6–1 | L Salm (AUT); L 7–5, 6–4, 6–1 | did not advance | | | |
| 17 | Albert Canet | France | Bye | C Langaard (NOR); W 6–3, 6–0, 6–1 | T Pell (USA); L 6–2, 6–3, 6–4 | did not advance | | | |
| 17 | Torsten Grönfors | Sweden | Bye | E Tóth (HUN); W w/o | V Ingerslev (DEN); L 6–1, 6–2, 6–2 | did not advance | | | |
| 17 | Victor Hansen | Denmark | Bye | Ö Schmid (HUN); W w/o | B von Kehrling (HUN); L 6–2, 6–1, 6–8, 6–4 | did not advance | | | |
| 17 | Aurél von Kelemen | Hungary | Bye | L von Baráth (HUN); W 6–1, 6–3, 6–4 | L Heyden (GER); L 6–3, 4–6, 7–5, 7–5 | did not advance | | | |
| 17 | Frans Möller | Sweden | Bye | J-P Samazeuilh (FRA); W w/o | H Kitson (RSA); L 6–2, 6–2, 6–3 | did not advance | | | |
| 17 | Karel Robětín | Bohemia | Bye | K von Wessely (AUT); W w/o | A Zborzil (AUT); L 6–4, 6–2, 6–1 | did not advance | | | |
| 17 | Leif Rovsing | Denmark | Bye | P Segner (HUN); W w/o | C Wennergren (SWE); L 4–6, 9–7, 6–8, 6–1, 6–1 | did not advance | | | |
| 17 | Gunnar Setterwall | Sweden | Bye | O Blom (NED); W 6–3, 6–3, 8–6 | M Sumarokov (RUS); L 6–2, 6–3, 3–5, 6–2 | did not advance | | | |
| 17 | Robert Spiess | Germany | Bye | J Just (BOH); W 2–6, 6–3, 3–6, 6–3, 6–1 | H Schomburgk (GER); L 8–6, 6–1, 6–4 | did not advance | | | |
| 17 | Willem Stibolt | Norway | Bye | D Lawton (FRA); W w/o | J Šebek (BOH); L 6–1, 6–3, 6–0 | did not advance | | | |
| 17 | Axel Thayssen | Denmark | K Ardelt (BOH); W w/o | A Madsen (DEN); W 6–1, 6–3, 3–6, 6–3 | C Winslow (RSA); L 6–4, 3–6, 6–4, 6–4 | did not advance | | | |
| 17 | Jenő Zsigmondy | Hungary | Bye | H Liebisch (AUT); W w/o | O von Müller (GER); L 6–1, 6–2, 6–0 | did not advance | | | |
| 31 | Jørgen Arenholt | Denmark | Bye | V Ingerslev (DEN); L 6–2, 1–6, 6–0, 6–4 | did not advance | | | | |
| 31 | Leó von Baráth | Hungary | Bye | A von Kelemen (HUN); L 6–1, 6–3, 6–4 | did not advance | | | | |
| 31 | Curt Benckert | Sweden | Bye | A Zborzil (AUT); L 6–2, 6–4, 1–6, 6–3 | did not advance | | | | |
| 31 | Herman Bjørklund | Norway | Bye | O Kreuzer (GER); L 6–0, 6–0, 6–1 | did not advance | | | | |
| 31 | Otto Blom | Netherlands | Bye | G Setterwall (SWE); L 6–3, 6–3, 8–6 | did not advance | | | | |
| 31 | Trygve Smith | Norway | Bye | W Boström (SWE); L 6–2, 6–4, 6–1 | did not advance | | | | |
| 31 | Ove Frederiksen | Denmark | Bye | O von Müller (GER); L 6–2, 6–1, 6–4 | did not advance | | | | |
| 31 | Ernst Frigast | Denmark | Bye | C Winslow (RSA); L 7–5, 6–2, 6–3 | did not advance | | | | |
| 31 | Bohuslav Hykš | Bohemia | Bye | F Blanchy (FRA); L 5–7, 6–1, 6–2, 6–1 | did not advance | | | | |
| 31 | Jaroslav Just | Bohemia | Bye | R Spiess (GER); L 2–6, 6–3, 3–6, 6–3, 6–1 | did not advance | | | | |
| 31 | Conrad Langaard | Norway | Bye | A Canet (FRA); L 6–3, 6–0, 6–1 | did not advance | | | | |
| 31 | Hakon Leffler | Sweden | Bye | H Kitson (RSA); L 6–2, 6–1, 6–0 | did not advance | | | | |
| 31 | Aage Madsen | Denmark | Bye | A Thayssen (DEN); L 6–1, 6–3, 3–6, 6–3 | did not advance | | | | |
| 31 | Édouard Mény de Marangue | France | Bye | L Heyden (GER); L 7–9, 4–6, 6–2, 7–5, 6–1 | did not advance | | | | |
| 31 | Richard Peterson | Norway | Bye | L Salm (AUT); L 6–1, 7–5, 6–3 | did not advance | | | | |
| 31 | Felix Pipes | Austria | O Lindpaintner (GER); W 6–2, 6–3, 6–3 | L Tapscott (RSA); L 3–6, 7–5, 4–6, 7–5, 7–5 | did not advance | | | | |
| 31 | Jaromír Zeman | Bohemia | Bye | C Wennergren (SWE); L 6–1, 6–0, 6–0 | did not advance | | | | |
| 48 | Jiří Kodl | Bohemia | L Tapscott (RSA); L 6–4, 6–1, 6–2 | did not advance | | | | | |
| 48 | Otto Lindpaintner | Germany | F Pipes (AUT); L 6–2, 6–3, 6–3 | did not advance | | | | | |
| — | Aleksandr Alenitsyn | Russia | Bye | M Sumarokov (RUS); L w/o | did not advance | | | | |
| — | Bjarne Angell | Norway | Bye | O Relly (AUT); W w/o | O Kreuzer (GER); L w/o | did not advance | | | |
| — | Karel Ardelt | Bohemia | A Thayssen (DEN); L w/o | did not advance | | | | | |
| — | Rudolf Bertrand | Austria | Bye | H Planner von Plaun (AUT); W w/o | L Žemla (BOH); L w/o | did not advance | | | |
| — | Paller Gyula | Hungary | Bye | T Pell (USA); L w/o | did not advance | | | | |
| — | Otto Froitzheim | Germany | Bye | J Šebek (BOH); L w/o | did not advance | | | | |
| — | Adolf Hammacher | Bohemia | Bye | L Žemla (GER); L w/o | did not advance | | | | |
| — | Carl Kempe | Sweden | Bye | B von Kehrling (HUN); L w/o | did not advance | | | | |
| — | Daniel Lawton | France | Bye | W Stibolt (NOR); L w/o | did not advance | | | | |
| — | Hermann Liebisch | Austria | Bye | J Zsigmondy (HUN); L w/o | did not advance | | | | |
| — | Jean Montariol | France | Bye | H Schomburgk (GER); L w/o | did not advance | | | | |
| — | Herbert Planner von Plaun | Austria | Bye | R Bertrand (AUT); L w/o | did not advance | | | | |
| — | Otto Relly | Austria | Bye | B Angell (NOR); L w/o | did not advance | | | | |
| — | Jean-Pierre Samazeuilh | France | Bye | F Möller (SWE); L w/o | did not advance | | | | |
| — | Ödön Schmid | Hungary | Bye | V Hansen (DEN); L w/o | did not advance | | | | |
| — | Pál Segner | Hungary | Bye | L Rovsing (DEN); L w/o | did not advance | | | | |
| — | Ede Tóth | Hungary | Bye | T Grönfors (SWE); L w/o | did not advance | | | | |
| — | Kurt von Wessely | Austria | Bye | K Robětín (BOH); L w/o | did not advance | | | | |
