= Tennis at the 1912 Summer Olympics – Men's outdoor doubles =

Men's doubles tennis at the Games of the V Olympiad
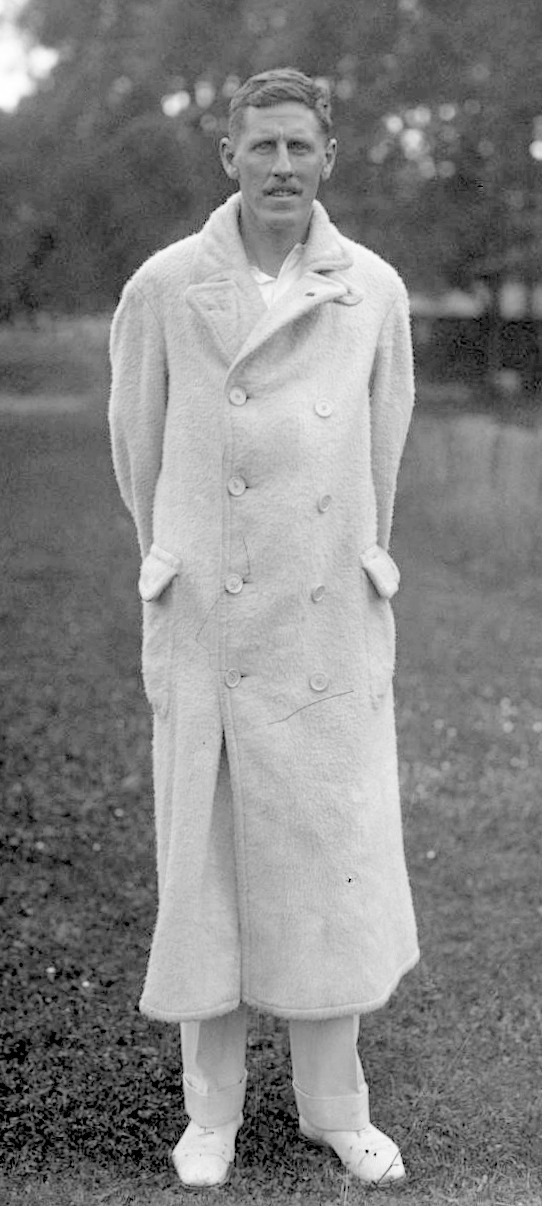
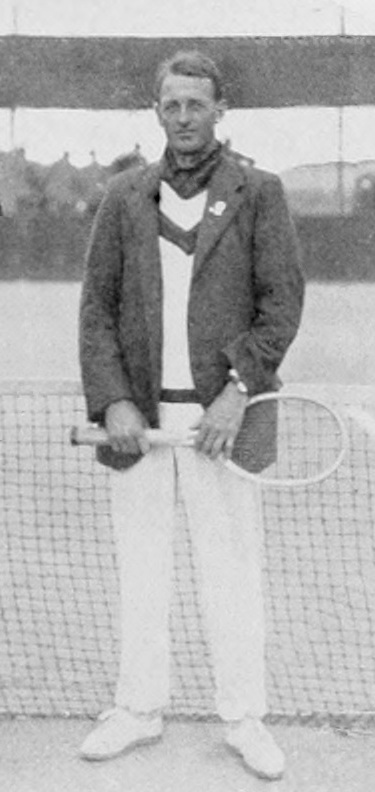
- Harold Kitson Charles Winslow
- Venue: Östermalms IP
- Dates: 28 June – 5 July 1912
- Competitors: 21 teams (42 players) from 10 nations

Medalists
1st place, gold medalist(s)		Harold Kitson; Charles Winslow; South Africa
2nd place, silver medalist(s)		Felix Pipes; Arthur Zborzil; Austria
3rd place, bronze medalist(s)		Albert Canet; Édouard Mény de Marangue; France

Men's outdoor doubles
- Tennis at the 1912 Summer Olympics

Events
Outdoor
Singles	men	women
Doubles	men		mixed
Indoor
Singles	men	women
Doubles	men		mixed
- Summer Olympics

The outdoor men's doubles competition at the 1912 Summer Olympics was part of the tennis program for the games. There were 42 players from 10 nations, comprising 21 teams. Nations were limited to 4 pairs (8 players) each. The event was won by South African team Harold Kitson and Charles Winslow, defeating Austrians Felix Pipes and Arthur Zborzil in the final. It was the first medal in the event for both nations. France earned its first men's double since 1900 as Albert Canet and Édouard Mény de Marangue defeated Jaroslav Just and Ladislav Žemla of Bohemia in the bronze-medal match.

== Background ==
This was the fifth appearance of the men's doubles tennis. The event has been held at every Summer Olympics where tennis has been on the program: from 1896 to 1924 and then from 1988 to the current program. A demonstration event was held in 1968. 1912 was the second and last time an indoor version was held concurrently.

The British brothers Laurence Doherty and Reginald Doherty had been dominant for the late 1890s and early 1900s, winning the 1900 Olympic championship and eight consecutive Wimbledon titles. Both had retired by 1912, however, and there was no dominant doubles team.

The 1908 Official Report's recommendation to schedule Olympic tennis not so close to Wimbledon was not acted upon; indeed, the scheduling issue was worse in 1912. Rather than starting three days after the end of Wimbledon, the Olympic outdoor tennis events were now at the same time as Wimbledon. The indoor events, held in May, were thus attended by top-flight players, while the outdoor competitions were not.

Denmark, Norway, Russia, and Sweden each made their debut in the event. Germany made its fourth appearance in the event, most among nations, having missed only the 1900 event.

== Competition format ==
The competition was a single-elimination tournament with a bronze-medal match. All matches were best-of-five sets. Tiebreaks had not been invented yet.

== Schedule ==
The tournament was beset by withdrawals.

Date	Time	Round
Friday, 28 June 1912		Round of 32
Saturday, 29 June 1912		Round of 32; Round of 16
Sunday, 30 June 1912		Round of 32; Round of 16
Monday, 1 July 1912	17:00	Round of 16; Quarterfinals
Tuesday, 2 July 1912	11:00; 14:00	Quarterfinals
Wednesday, 3 July 1912	11:00; 17:30	Semifinals
Thursday, 4 July 1912	15:00	Final
Friday, 5 July 1912	15:00	Bronze medal match

== Draw ==
Key

- Q = Qualifier
- WC = Wild card
- LL = Lucky loser
- Alt = Alternate
- ITF = ITF entry
- PR = Protected ranking
- SR = Special ranking
- SE = Special exempt
- JE = Junior exempt
- JR = Junior Accelerator Programme entrant
- CO = College Accelerator Programme entrant
- NG = Next Gen Accelerator Program entrant
- w/o = Walkover
- r = Retired
- d = Defaulted

=== Finals ===
Semifinals
Albert Canet (FRA); Édouard Mény de Marangue (FRA)	5	6	6	8	8
Felix Pipes (AUT); Arthur Zborzil (AUT)	7	2	3	10	10
Harold Kitson (RSA); Charles Winslow (RSA)	4	6	7	6
Jaroslav Just (BOH); Ladislav Žemla (BOH)	6	1	5	4

Final (gold-medal match)
Felix Pipes (AUT); Arthur Zborzil (AUT)	6	1	2	2
Harold Kitson (RSA); Charles Winslow (RSA)	4	6	6	6
Bronze-medal match
Albert Canet (FRA); Édouard Mény de Marangue (FRA)	13	6	8
Jaroslav Just (BOH); Ladislav Žemla (BOH)	11	3	6

=== Top half ===
First round
H Schomburgk (GER); O von Müller (GER)	6	6	6
L von Bárath (HUN); A von Kelemen (HUN)	0	0	2
D Lawton (FRA); J-P Samazeuilh (FRA)	w/o
A Canet (FRA); É Mény de Marangue (FRA)
M Sumarokov (RU1); A Alenitsyn (RU1)
F Blanchy (FRA); J Montariol (FRA)	w/o
V Hansen (DEN); L Rovsing (DEN)
J Kodl (BOH); K Robětín (BOH)	w/o
O Froitzheim (GER); O Kreuzer (GER)	w/o
C Benckert (SWE); W Boström (SWE)
A Hammacher (GER); O Lindpaintner (GER) (Note: Official Olympic sources give different results for this double walkover round. This is probably because none of the teams showed up to the match.)
P Gyula (HUN); Ö Schmid (HUN)	w/o
C Kempe (SWE); G Setterwall (SWE)	w/o
L Salm (AUT); H Planner von Plaun (AUT)
H Bjørklund (NOR); T Smith (NOR)	0	2	0
F Pipes (AUT); A Zborzil (AUT)	6	6	6

Second round
H Schomburgk (GER); O von Müller (GER)	8	3	2	3
A Canet (FRA); É Mény de Marangue (FRA)	6	6	6	6
M Sumarokov (RU1); A Alenitsyn (RU1)	2	6	7	6
V Hansen (DEN); L Rovsing (DEN)	6	3	5	3
C Benckert (SWE); W Boström (SWE)
A Hammacher (GER); O Lindpaintner (GER)	w/o
L Salm (AUT); H Planner von Plaun (AUT)	w/o
F Pipes (AUT); A Zborzil (AUT)

Quarterfinals
A Canet (FRA); É Mény de Marangue (FRA)	6	6	6
M Sumarokov (RU1); A Alenitsyn (RU1)	3	0	1
C Benckert (SWE); W Boström (SWE)	3	6	1	1
F Pipes (AUT); A Zborzil (AUT)	6	4	6	6

Semifinals
A Canet (FRA); É Mény de Marangue (FRA)	5	6	6	8	8
F Pipes (AUT); A Zborzil (AUT)	7	2	3	10	10

=== Bottom half ===
First round
B Hykš (BOH); J Šebek (BOH)	3	4	4
A Madsen (DEN); A Thayssen (DEN)	6	6	6
C-O Nylén (SWE); C Wennergren (SWE)
P Segner (HUN); E Tóth (HUN)	w/o
B von Kehrling (HUN); J Zsigmondy (HUN)	3	6	6	6
K Robětín (BOH); J Zeman (BOH)	6	1	4	4
H Kitson (RSA); C Winslow (RSA)	6	6	6
J Arenholt (DEN); V Ingerslev (DEN)	4	1	4
B Angell (NOR); W Stibolt (NOR)	1	2	0
J Just (BOH); L Žemla (BOH)	6	6	6
C Langaard (NOR); R Petersen (NOR)
R Bertrand (AUT); K von Wessely (AUT)	w/o
L Heyden (GER); R Spiess (GER)	3	6	6	4	6
T Grönfors (SWE); F Möller (SWE)	6	4	2	6	1

Second round
A Madsen (DEN); A Thayssen (DEN)	1	2	4
C-O Nylén (SWE); C Wennergren (SWE)	6	6	6
B von Kehrling (HUN); J Zsigmondy (HUN)	3	3	9	2
H Kitson (RSA); C Winslow (RSA)	6	6	7	6
J Just (BOH); L Žemla (BOH)	6	6	6
Langaard (NOR); Petersen (NOR)	1	2	4
L Heyden (GER); R Spiess (GER)	6	7	6
O Frederiksen (DEN); E Frigast (DEN)	2	5	3

Quarterfinals
C-O Nylén (SWE); C Wennergren (SWE)	3	5	1
H Kitson (RSA); C Winslow (RSA)	6	7	6
J Just (BOH); L Žemla (BOH)	6	8	6
L Heyden (GER); R Spiess (GER)	0	6	4

Semifinals
H Kitson (RSA); C Winslow (RSA)	4	6	7	6
J Just (BOH); L Žemla (BOH)	6	1	5	4
