= South Africa at the 1912 Summer Olympics =

- IOC code: RSA (ZAF used at these Games)
- NOC: South African Olympic and Empire Games Association

in Stockholm
- Competitors: 21 in 6 sports
- Medals Ranked 7th: Gold 4 Silver 2 Bronze 0 Total 6

Summer Olympics appearances (overview)
- 1904; 1908; 1912; 1920; 1924; 1928; 1932; 1936; 1948; 1952; 1956; 1960; 1964–1988; 1992; 1996; 2000; 2004; 2008; 2012; 2016; 2020; 2024

The Union of South Africa competed at the 1912 Summer Olympics in Stockholm, Sweden. 21 competitors, all men, took part in 21 events in 6 sports.

== Medalists ==
=== Gold ===
- Ken McArthur — Athletics, Men's Marathon
- Rudolph Lewis — Cycling, Men's Individual Time Trial
- Harold Kitson and Charles Winslow — Tennis, Men's doubles outdoor
- Charles Winslow — Tennis, Men's singles outdoor

=== Silver ===
- Christian Gitsham — Athletics, Men's Marathon
- Harold Kitson — Tennis Men's singles outdoor

== Aquatics ==
=== Swimming ===
A single swimmer competed for South Africa at the 1912 Games. It was the nation's debut in swimming. Godfrey competed in one event, placing fifth in his quarterfinal of the 400 metre freestyle and not advancing to the semifinals.

Ranks given for each swimmer are within the heat.

Men

Swimmer	Events	Heat		Quarterfinal		Semifinal		Final	
Swimmer	Events	Result	Rank	Result	Rank	Result	Rank	Result	Rank
George Godfrey	400 m freestyle	N/A		6:30.6	4	did not advance			

== Athletics ==
Seven athletes represented South Africa. It was the nation's third appearance in both the sport and the Olympics. McArthur and Gitsham finished first and second, respectively, in the marathon to give South Africa its only athletics medals in 1912 as well as an Olympic record in the event with McArthur's mark. Richardson's Olympic record in the 10000 metres, set in the semifinals, was broken in the final; Richardson did not finish that race.

Ranks given are within that athlete's heat for running events.

Athlete	Events	Heat		Semifinal		Final	
Athlete	Events	Result	Rank	Result	Rank	Result	Rank
Christian Gitsham	Marathon	N/A				2:37:52.0	2nd place, silver medalist(s)
Ken McArthur	Marathon	N/A				2:36:54.8 OR	1st place, gold medalist(s)
George Patching	100 m	?	2 Q	19.9	1 Q	11.0	4
George Patching	200 m	22.3	1 Q	did not finish		did not advance	
George Patching	400 m	51.1	1 Q	50.5	3	did not advance	
Reuben Povey	100 m	?	2 Q	?	2	did not advance	
Reuben Povey	200 m	?	2 Q	?	5	did not advance	
Leonard Richardson	10000 m	N/A		32:30.3 OR	1	did not finish	
Leonard Richardson	Marathon	N/A				did not start	
Leonard Richardson	Ind. cross country	N/A				47:33.5	8
Arthur St. Norman	Marathon	N/A				did not finish	
Arthur St. Norman	10 km walk	N/A		50:17.9	2 Q	Disqualified	
John Victor	800 m	?	3	did not advance			
John Victor	1500 m	N/A		4:12.7	3	did not advance	

== Cycling ==
A single cyclist represented South Africa. It was the second appearance of the nation in cycling. Rudolph Lewis won the gold medal, South Africa's first cycling medal.

=== Road cycling ===
Cyclist	Events	Final	
Cyclist	Events	Result	Rank
Rudolph Lewis	Ind. time trial	10:42:39.0	1st place, gold medalist(s)

== Fencing ==
A single fencer represented South Africa. It was the second appearance of the nation in fencing. Walter Gate, who had also been South Africa's only fencer in 1908, competed in all three weapons and was defeated in the first round of each competition.

Fencer	Event	Round 1		Quarterfinal		Semifinal		Final	
Fencer	Event	Record	Rank	Record	Rank	Record	Rank	Record	Rank
Walter Gates	Foil	4 losses	5	did not advance					
Walter Gates	Épée	5 losses	7	did not advance					
Walter Gates	Sabre	1 win	4	did not advance					

== Shooting ==
Eight shooters represented South Africa. It was the nation's first appearance in shooting. The South African team took fourth place in the team rifle competition; this was the closest the nation got to winning a medal in shooting. The best individual performance was Harvey's tenth place finish in the military rifle.

Shooter	Event	Final	
Shooter	Event	Result	Rank
Robert Bodley	300 m free rifle, 3 pos.	806	55
Robert Bodley	600 m free rifle	73	54
Robert Bodley	300 m military rifle, 3 pos.	78	45
Charles Jeffreys	300 m free rifle, 3 pos.	715	70
Charles Jeffreys	600 m free rifle	76	42
Charles Jeffreys	300 m military rifle, 3 pos.	82	34
Albert Johnstone	300 m free rifle, 3 pos.	741	67
Albert Johnstone	600 m free rifle	75	43
Albert Johnstone	300 m military rifle, 3 pos.	62	77
George Harvey	300 m free rifle, 3 pos.	874	40
George Harvey	600 m free rifle	83	21
George Harvey	300 m military rifle, 3 pos.	90	10
Ernest Keeley	300 m free rifle, 3 pos.	800	56
Ernest Keeley	300 m military rifle, 3 pos.	89	13
Robert Patterson	300 m free rifle, 3 pos.	810	51
Robert Patterson	600 m free rifle	73	53
Robert Patterson	300 m military rifle, 3 pos.	72	59
Arthur Smith	300 m free rifle, 3 pos.	752	64
Arthur Smith	300 m military rifle, 3 pos.	56	84
George Whelan	300 m free rifle, 3 pos.	762	61
George Whelan	300 m military rifle, 3 pos.	64	73
Robert Bodley; George Harvey; Charles Jeffreys; Ernest Keeley; Arthur Smith; Robert Patterson	Team rifle	1531	4
Robert Bodley; George Harvey; Ernest Keeley; Arthur Smith; Robert Patterson; George Whelan	Team free rifle	4897	6

== Tennis ==
Three tennis players represented South Africa at the 1912 Games. It was the nation's second appearance in tennis.

Kitson and Winslow dominated the men's outdoor competitions. They met in the final of the singles tournament, with Winslow taking the championship and Kitson winning silver. The two also paired up for the doubles tournament, defeating all their opponents to add a third medal. Tapscott, competing in the singles only, advanced to the round of 16 before losing to an eventual semifinalist.

Men

Athlete	Event	Round of 128	Round of 64	Round of 32	Round of 16	Quarterfinals	Semifinals	Final	
Athlete	Event	Opposition Score	Opposition Score	Opposition Score	Opposition Score	Opposition Score	Opposition Score	Opposition Score	Rank
Harold Kitson	Outdoor singles	Bye	Leffler (SWE); W 6-2, 6-1, 6-0	Möller (SWE); W 6-2, 6-2, 6-3	Schomburgk (GER); W 6-2, 6-2, 6-3	von Salm (AUT); W 6-2, 6-2, 6-4	Žemla (BOH); W 2-6, 6-3, 6-2, 4-6, 6-2	Winslow (RSA); L 7-5, 4-6, 10-8, 8-6	2nd place, silver medalist(s)
Lionel Tapscott	Outdoor singles	Kodl (BOH); W 6-4, 6-1, 6-2	Pipes (AUT); W 3-6, 7-5, 4-6, 7-5, 7-5	Blanchy (FRA); W 1-6, 5-7, 6-3, 6-4, 6-4	Žemla (BOH); L 6-1, 6-4, 2-6, 4-6, 2-6	did not advance			9
Charles Winslow	Outdoor singles	Bye	Frigast (DEN); W 7-5, 6-2, 6-3	Thayssen (DEN); W 6-4, 3-6, 6-4, 6-4	Ingerslev (DEN); W 6-4, 8-6, 6-4	Heyden (GER); W 6-2, 6-4, 8-10, 4-6, 6-3	Kreuzer (GER); W 9-7, 7-5, 6-2	Kitson (RSA); W 7-5, 4-6, 10-8, 8-6	1st place, gold medalist(s)
Harold Kitson; Charles Winslow	Outdoor doubles	N/A		Arenholt & Ingerslev (DEN); W 6-4, 6-1, 6-4	Kehrling & Zsigmondy (HUN); W 6-3, 6-3, 7-9, 6-2	Nylén & Wennergren (SWE); W 6-3, 7-5, 6-1	Just & Žemla (BOH); W 4-6, 6-1, 7-5, 6-4	Pipes & Zborzil (AUT); W 4-6, 6-1, 6-2, 6-2	1st place, gold medalist(s)
