= Denmark at the 1912 Summer Olympics =

- IOC code: DEN
- NOC: Danish Olympic Committee

in Stockholm
- Competitors: 152 (151 men and 1 woman) in 13 sports
- Flag bearer: Arne Højme
- Medals Ranked 14th: Gold 1 Silver 6 Bronze 5 Total 12

Summer Olympics appearances (overview)
- 1896; 1900; 1904; 1908; 1912; 1920; 1924; 1928; 1932; 1936; 1948; 1952; 1956; 1960; 1964; 1968; 1972; 1976; 1980; 1984; 1988; 1992; 1996; 2000; 2004; 2008; 2012; 2016; 2020; 2024; 2028

Other related appearances
- 1906 Intercalated Games

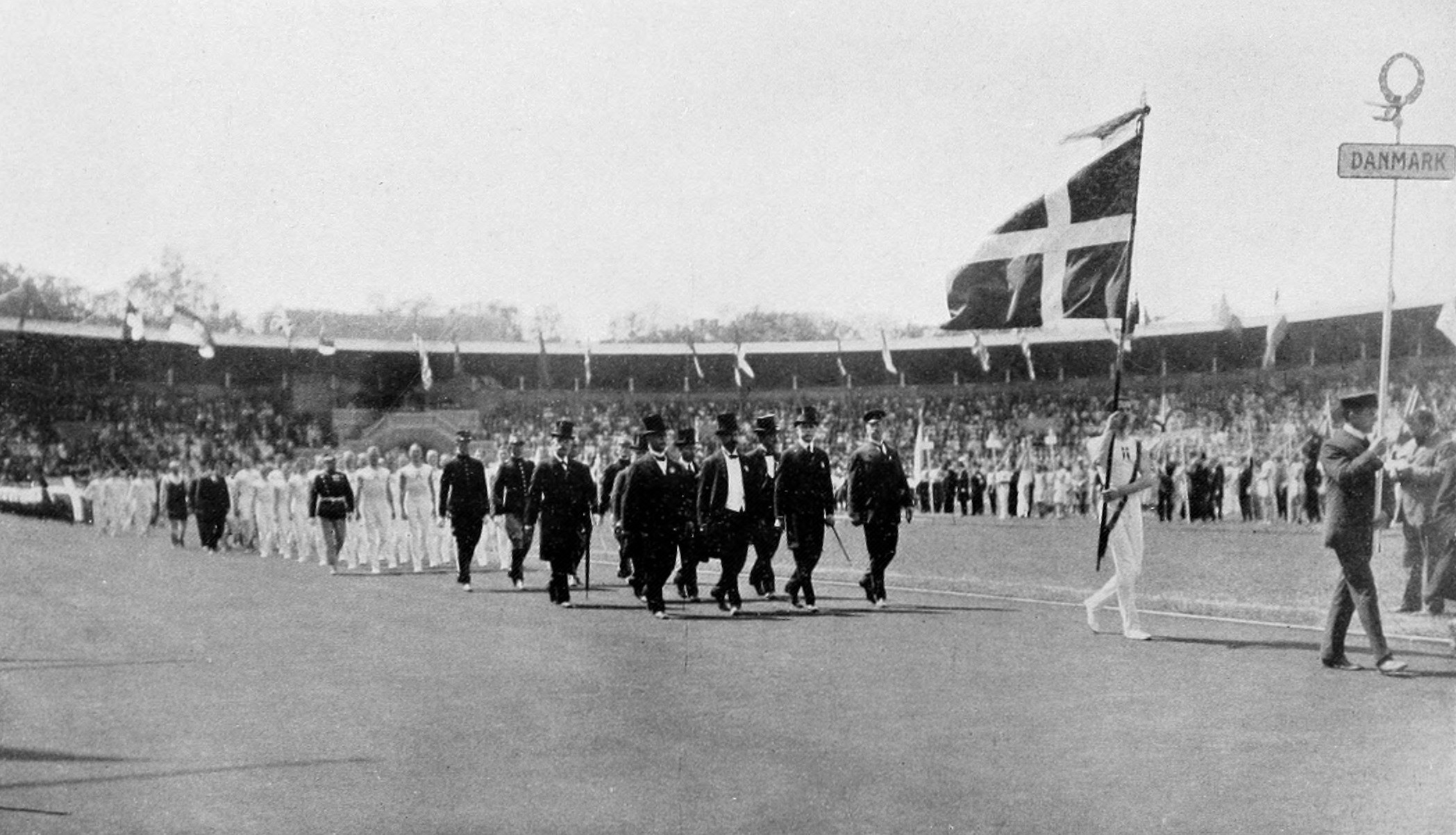
The team of Denmark at the opening ceremony.

Denmark competed at the 1912 Summer Olympics in Stockholm, Sweden. 152 competitors, 151 men and 1 woman, took part in 46 events in 13 sports.

== Medalists ==
=== Gold ===
- Ejler Allert, Christian Hansen, Carl Møller, Carl Pedersen and Poul Hartmann — Rowing, Men's coxed fours, inriggers

=== Silver ===
- Ivan Joseph Martin Osiier — Fencing, Men's Épée
- Men's Team — Football
- Men's Team (Swedish system) — Gymnastics
- Steen Herschend, Sven Thomsen and Hans Meulengracht-Madsen — Sailing, Men's 6m class
- Lars Madsen — Shooting, Men's 300m free rifle, three positions
- Sofie Castenschiold — Tennis, Women's singles indoor

=== Bronze ===
- Men's Team, free system — Gymnastics
- Erik Bisgaard, Rasmus Frandsen, Mikael Simonsen, Poul Thymann and Ejgil Clemmensen — Rowing, Men's coxed fours
- Niels Larsen — Shooting, Men's 300m free rifle, three positions
- Ole Olsen, Lars Madsen, Niels Larsen, Niels Andersen, Laurits Larsen and Jens Hajslund — Shooting, Men's Team free rifle
- Søren Jensen — Wrestling, Greco-Roman heavyweight

== Athletics ==
14 athletes represented Denmark. It was the fourth appearance of the nation in athletics, which Denmark had competed in each time the nation appeared at the Olympics. Aage Rasmussen's fourth-place finish in the racewalk was Denmark's best athletics result in 1912.

Ranks given are within that athlete's heat for running events.

Athlete	Events	Heat		Semifinal		Final	
Athlete	Events	Result	Rank	Result	Rank	Result	Rank
Holger Baden	Ind. cross country	N/A				Did not finish	
Johannes Christensen	Marathon	N/A				3:21:57.4	29
Karl Christiansen	Ind. cross country	N/A				49:06.4	14
Fritz Danild	Ind. cross country	N/A				Did not finish	
Vilhelm Gylche	10 km walk	N/A		51:13.8	4	Did not finish	
Karl Julius Jensen	Ind. cross country	N/A				Did not finish	
Svend Langkjær	Decathlon	N/A				1830.850	26
Olaf Lodal	Marathon	N/A				3:21:57.6	30
Niels Petersen	10 km walk	N/A		Disqualified		Did not advance	
Viggo Petersen	Ind. cross country	N/A				53:00.8	23
Aage Rasmussen	10 km walk	N/A		48:15.8	3	48:00.0	4
Steen Rasmussen	Ind. cross country	N/A				55:27.0	28
Gerhard Topp	Ind. cross country	N/A				54:24.9	26
Fritz Vikke	Pole vault	N/A		3.40	16	Did not advance	
Karl Christiansen; Viggo Petersen; Gerhard Topp	Team cross country	N/A				36	5

== Cycling ==
Eight cyclists represented Denmark. It was the first appearance of the nation in cycling. Olaf Meyland-Smith had the best time in the time trial, the only race held, placing 25th. The top four Danish cyclists had a combined time that placed them 8th of the 15 teams.

=== Road cycling ===
Cyclist	Events	Final	
Cyclist	Events	Result	Rank
Charles Hansen	Ind. time trial	11:40:04.0	32
Otto Jensen	Ind. time trial	Did not finish	
Olaf Meyland-Smith	Ind. time trial	11:32:24.2	25
Valdemar Nielsen	Ind. time trial	12:33:09.2	72
Valdemar Christoffer Nielsen	Ind. time trial	Did not finish	
Godtfred Olsen	Ind. time trial	12:06:18.8	53
Hans Olsen	Ind. time trial	Did not finish	
Johannes Reinwaldt	Ind. time trial	11:57:20.0	48
Charles Hansen; Olaf Meyland-Smith; Godtfred Olsen; Johannes Reinwaldt	Team time trial	47:16:07.0	8

== Equestrian ==
Dressage

Rider	Horse	Event	Final	
Rider	Horse	Event	Penalties	Rank
Rudolf Keyper	Kinley Princess	Individual	111	16
Carl Saunte	Streg	Individual	120	18

Eventing

(The maximum score in each of the five events was 10.00 points. Ranks given are for the cumulative score after each event. Team score is the sum of the top three individual scores.)

Rider	Horse	Event	Long distance		Cross country		Steeplechase		Show jumping		Dressage		Total	
Rider	Horse	Event	Score	Rank	Score	Rank	Score	Rank	Score	Rank	Score	Rank	Score	Rank
Frode Kirkebjerg	Dibbe-Lippe	Individual	10.00	1	5.69	23	10.00	20	Did not start		Retired		Did not finish	
Carl Kraft	Gorm	Individual	10.00	1	10.00	1	Did not start		Retired				Did not finish	
Carl Saunte	Streg	Individual	Did not finish		Retired								Did not finish	
Frode Kirkebjerg; Carl Kraft; Carl Saunte	Dibbe-Lippe; Gorm; Streg	Team	Did not finish		Retired								Did not finish	

== Fencing ==
Six fencers represented Denmark. It was the fourth appearance of the nation in fencing, in which Denmark had competed each time the nation appeared at the Olympics. Ivan Osiier was the only Danish fencer to advance to the final in an event, eventually capturing the silver medal in the épée. His second-place finish was the best in Danish Olympic fencing history at the time, as no Danish fencer had gotten to a final since Holger Nielsen won the bronze in the 1896 sabre competition.

Fencer	Event	Round 1		Quarterfinal		Semifinal		Final	
Fencer	Event	Record	Rank	Record	Rank	Record	Rank	Record	Rank
Oluf Berntsen	Foil	3 losses	4	Did not advance					
Oluf Berntsen	Épée	4 losses	5	Did not advance					
Oluf Berntsen	Sabre	2 wins	2 Q	2 losses	3 Q	0 wins	6	Did not advance	
Jens Berthelsen	Foil	3 losses	3 Q	3 losses	4	Did not advance			
Jens Berthelsen	Épée	3 losses	3 Q	5 losses	6	Did not advance			
Jens Berthelsen	Sabre	1 win	3 Q	3 losses	4	Did not advance			
Einar Levison	Foil	0 losses	1 Q	3 losses	4	Did not advance			
Einar Levison	Épée	1 loss	1 Q	2 losses	3 Q	4 losses	4	Did not advance	
Einar Levison	Sabre	3 wins	1 Q	4 losses	5	Did not advance			
Hans Olsen	Foil	4 losses	6	Did not advance					
Hans Olsen	Épée	6 losses	8	Did not advance					
Ivan Osiier	Foil	0 losses	1 Q	1 loss	1 Q	?	5	Did not advance	
Ivan Osiier	Épée	0 losses	1 Q	1 loss	1 Q	2 losses	1 Q	5–2	2nd place, silver medalist(s)
Lauritz Østrup	Foil	2 losses	3 Q	3 losses	4	Did not advance			
Lauritz Østrup	Épée	3 losses	4	Did not advance					
Oluf Berntsen; Jens Berthelsen; Ejnar Levison; Hans Olsen; Ivan Osiier; Lauritz Østrup	Team épée	N/A		2–0	1 Q	1–2	3	Did not advance	
Jens Berthelsen; Ejnar Levison; Hans Olsen; Ivan Osiier; Lauritz Østrup	Team sabre	N/A		0–2	3	Did not advance			

== Football ==
Quarterfinals

1912-06-30

Denmark	7 – 0	Norway
Olsen 4' 70' 88'; S. Nielsen 60' 85'; Wolfhagen 25'; Middelboe 37'

Råsunda Stadium, Stockholm
Attendance: 700

Semifinals

1912-07-02

Denmark	4 – 1	Netherlands
Olsen 14' 87'; Jørgensen 7'; P. Nielsen 37'		H. Hansen 85' (o.g.)

Olympiastadion, Stockholm
Attendance: 6,000

Final

1912-07-04

Great Britain	4 – 2	Denmark
Hoare 22' 41'; Walden 10'; Berry 43'		Olsen 27' 81'

Olympiastadion, Stockholm
Attendance: 25,000

Final rank
Silver

== Gymnastics ==
Forty-nine gymnasts represented Denmark. It was the third appearance of the nation in gymnastics. Denmark had a team compete in two of the three team competitions. The Danish teams won the nation's first gymnastics medals, placing third of five in the free system and second of three in the Swedish system. Six Danish gymnasts competed in the individual competition, with Arvor Hansen's 26th-place finish the best of the six.

=== Artistic ===
Gymnast	Events	Final	
Gymnast	Events	Result	Rank
Axel Andersen	All-around	98.75	33
Arvor Hansen	All-around	107.50	26
Charles Jensen	All-around	103.75	30
Einar Møbius	All-around	86.75	40
Carl Pedersen	All-around	97.25	34
Niels Petersen	All-around	97.25	34
Denmark	Team, free system	21.25	3rd place, bronze medalist(s)
Denmark	Team, Swedish system	898.84	2nd place, silver medalist(s)

== Modern pentathlon ==
Denmark had four competitors in the first Olympic pentathlon competition. The Danish pentathletes had little success, with three of them not finishing and the fourth coming in last among the finishers, nearly 30 points behind the next nearest competitor.

(The scoring system was point-for-place in each of the five events, with the smallest point total winning.)

Athlete	Shooting		Swimming		Fencing			Riding			Running		Total points	Rank
Athlete	Score	Points	Time	Points	Wins	Touches	Points	Penalties	Time	Points	Time	Points	Total points	Rank
Kai Jølver	52	32	9:32.6	26	7	13	22	14	10:49.5	21	26:08.6	22	123	22
Vilhelm Laybourn	140	25	12:09.6	29	6	10	24	Disqualified			Retired		Did not finish	
Johannes Ussing	57	31	7:40.2	20	6	8	23	0	11:21.0	9	Did not finish		Did not finish	
Theodor Zeilau	93	30	7:59.4	22	4	7	26	Did not finish			Retired		Did not finish	

== Rowing ==
Fifteen rowers represented Denmark. It was the nation's first appearance in rowing. Denmark's debut was successful, especially in the coxed fours events, with the team winning a gold medal in the inriggers competition and a bronze in the outriggers.

(Ranks given are within each crew's heat.)

Rower	Event	Heats		Quarterfinals		Semifinals		Final	
Rower	Event	Result	Rank	Result	Rank	Result	Rank	Result	Rank
Mikael Simonsen	Single sculls	8:14.0	1 Q	Did not start		Did not advance			
Erik Bisgaard; Ejgil Clemmensen (cox); Rasmus Frandsen; Mikael Simonsen; Poul Thymann	Coxed four	7:20.0	1 Q	7:09.0	1 Q	Unknown	2	Did not advance ( (bronze) )	
Theodor Eyrich; Knud Gøtke; Hans Jørgensen; Johan Praem; Silva Smedberg (cox)	Coxed four	Unknown	2	Did not advance					
Ejler Allert; Christian Hansen; Poul Hartmann (cox); Carl Møller; Carl Pedersen	Coxed four, inriggers	N/A		7:52.0	1 Q	7:59.5	1 Q	7:44.6	1st place, gold medalist(s)

== Sailing ==
Three sailors represented Denmark. It was the nation's first appearance in sailing. Denmark sent only one boat, which took the silver medal in the six metre class.

(7 points for 1st in each race, 3 points for 2nd, 1 point for 3rd. Race-off to break ties in total points if necessary.)

Sailors	Event	Race 1			Race 2			Total		
Sailors	Event	Time	Points	Rank	Time	Points	Rank	Points	Race-off	Rank
Steen Herschend; Hans Meulengracht-Madsen; Sven Thomsen	6 metre class	2:34:41	7	1	2:26:07	3	2	10	2:41:40	2nd place, silver medalist(s)

== Shooting ==
Fourteen shooters represented Denmark. It was the nation's fourth appearance in shooting, in which Denmark had competed each time the nation appeared at the Olympics. Madsen and Niels Larsen took second and third, respectively, in the 300 metre free rifle from three positions to take the nation's only individual shooting medals in 1912; both were also on the six-man team which earned a bronze medal in the team rifle competition. They were the first medals won by Denmark in shooting since 1900.

Rower	Event	Final	
Rower	Event	Result	Rank
Hans Denver	300 m free rifle, 3 pos.	Did not finish	
Rasmus Friis	600 m free rifle	74	48
Povl Gerlow	50 m rifle, prone	167	38
Povl Gerlow	300 m free rifle, 3 pos.	772	60
Povl Gerlow	300 m free rifle, 3 pos.	64	74
Povl Gerlow	25 m small-bore rifle	174	31
Jens Hajslund	300 m free rifle, 3 pos.	Did not finish	
Laurits Larsen	300 m free rifle, 3 pos.	894	33
Laurits Larsen	50 m pistol	432	21
Niels Larsen	300 m free rifle, 3 pos.	962	3rd place, bronze medalist(s)
Niels Larsen	300 m free rifle, 3 pos.	70	63
Niels Larsen	50 m pistol	405	41
Lars Jørgen Madsen	300 m free rifle, 3 pos.	981	2nd place, silver medalist(s)
Lars Jørgen Madsen	50 m pistol	452	14
Anders Peter Nielsen	300 m free rifle, 3 pos.	849	47
Anders Peter Nielsen	50 m pistol	355	50
Frants Nielsen	50 m rifle, prone	180	26
Frants Nielsen	300 m free rifle, 3 pos.	851	46
Frants Nielsen	50 m pistol	406	40
Peter Sofus Nielsen	50 m pistol	397	43
Ole Olsen	300 m free rifle, 3 pos.	926	12
Hans Schultz	300 m free rifle, 3 pos.	808	52
Hans Schultz	600 m free rifle	75	44
Hans Schultz	300 m free rifle, 3 pos.	82	36
Hans Tauson	300 m free rifle, 3 pos.	921	16
Hans Denver; Povl Gerlow; Lars Jørgen Madsen; Frants Nielsen	50 m team small-bore rifle	708	5
Niels Andersen; Rasmus Friis; Jens Hajslund; Niels Larsen; Lars Jørgen Madsen; Hans Schultz	Team rifle	1419	8
Niels Andersen; Jens Hajslund; Laurits Larsen; Niels Larsen; Lars Jørgen Madsen; Ole Olsen	Team rifle	5570	3rd place, bronze medalist(s)

== Swimming ==
One swimmer competed for Denmark at the 1912 Games. It was the third time the nation had competed in swimming. Hedegaard was unable to advance out of the first round in either of his two events.

Ranks given for each swimmer are within the heat.

Men

Swimmer	Events	Heat		Quarterfinal		Semifinal		Final	
Swimmer	Events	Result	Rank	Result	Rank	Result	Rank	Result	Rank
Harry Hedegaard	400 m freestyle	N/A		7:07.8	5	Did not advance			
Harry Hedegaard	1500 m freestyle	N/A		28:32.4	3	Did not advance			

== Tennis ==
Ten tennis players, including one woman, represented Denmark at the 1912 Games. It was the nation's debut appearance in tennis. The lone Danish woman was also the lone Danish medalist, taking the silver medal in the indoor singles. She, along with Larsen, advanced to the quarterfinals in the indoor mixed doubles event as well. None of the other players advanced past the round of 16.

Men

Athlete	Event	Round of 128	Round of 64	Round of 32	Round of 16	Quarterfinals	Semifinals	Final	
Athlete	Event	Opposition Score	Opposition Score	Opposition Score	Opposition Score	Opposition Score	Opposition Score	Opposition Score	Rank
Jørgen Arneholt	Outdoor singles	Bye	Ingerslev (DEN); L 6-2, 1-6, 6-0, 6-4	Did not advance					31
Ove Fredriksen	Outdoor singles	Bye	von Müller (GER); L 6-2, 6-1, 6-4	Did not advance					31
Ernst Frigast	Outdoor singles	Bye	Winslow (RSA); L 7-5, 6-2, 6-3	Did not advance					31
Victor Hansen	Outdoor singles	Bye	Bye	Kehrling (HUN); L 6-2, 6-1, 6-8, 6-4	Did not advance				17
Vagn Ingerslev	Outdoor singles	Bye	Arneholt (DEN); W 6-2, 1-6, 6-0, 6-4	Grönfors (SWE); W 6-1, 6-2, 6-2	Winslow (RSA); L 6-4, 8-6, 6-4	Did not advance			9
Erik Larsen	Indoor singles	N/A		Gobert (FRA); L 8-6, 6-1, 5-7, 8-6	Did not advance				16
Aage Madsen	Outdoor singles	Bye	Thayssen (DEN); L 6-1, 6-3, 3-6, 6-3	Did not advance					31
Ludvig Rovsing	Outdoor singles	Bye	Bye	Wennergren (SWE); L 4-6, 9-7, 6-8, 6-1, 6-1	Did not advance				17
Axel Thayssen	Outdoor singles	Bye	Madsen (DEN); W 6-1, 6-3, 3-6, 6-3	Winslow (RSA); L 6-4, 3-6, 6-4, 6-4	Did not advance				17
Jørgen Arenholt; Vagn Ingerslev	Outdoor doubles	N/A		Kitson & Winslow (RSA); L 6-4, 6-1, 6-4	Did not advance				15
Victor Hansen; Ludvig Rovsing	Outdoor doubles	N/A		Bye	Alejnicyn & Sumarokow (RUS); L 2-6, 6-3, 7-5, 6-3	Did not advance			9
Aage Madsen; Axel Thayssen	Outdoor doubles	N/A		Hykš-Černý & Šebek (BOH); W 6-3, 6-4, 6-4	Nylén & Wennergren (SWE); L 6-1, 6-2, 6-4	Did not advance			9
Ove Frederiksen; Ernst Frigast	Outdoor doubles	N/A		Bye	Heyden & Spiess (GER); L 6-2, 7-5, 6-3	Did not advance			9

Women

Athlete	Event	Round of 16	Quarterfinals	Semifinals	Final	
Athlete	Event	Opposition Score	Opposition Score	Opposition Score	Opposition Score	Rank
Thora Castenschiold	Indoor singles	Bye	Aitchison (GBR); W 2-6, 6-2, 6-1	Fick (SWE); W 6-4, 6-4	Hannam (GBR); L 6-4, 6-3	2nd place, silver medalist(s)

Mixed

Athlete	Event	Round of 16	Quarterfinals	Semifinals	Final	
Athlete	Event	Opposition Score	Opposition Score	Opposition Score	Opposition Score	Rank
Thora Castenschiold; Erik Larsen	Indoor doubles	Bye	Aitchison & Barrett (GBR); L 6-0, 6-3	Did not advance		5

== Wrestling ==
=== Greco-Roman ===
Denmark sent nine wrestlers in 1912. It was the nation's second Olympic wrestling appearance.

Two of the three Danish bronze medalists returned in 1912. Andersen, the middleweight, was not as successful as four years earlier; he lost his first two matches to be eliminated at 26th place. Jensen, on the other hand, matched his prior bronze with another. He won his first three matches before taking his first loss to Saarela. In a loser-out fifth round match against Backenius, Jensen won and advanced to the medal round. There, he again faced Saarela; a second loss to the Finn put Jensen in a match against Olin. The winner of this match would face Saarela in the final while the loser would take the bronze medal. Olin turned out to be too much for Jensen, who finished the tournament with the bronze.

Four other Danes advanced to the fifth round before receiving their second loss and elimination. The team overall went 15-17 in the elimination rounds and 0-2 in the medal round.

Wrestler	Class	First round	Second round	Third round	Fourth round	Fifth round	Sixth round	Seventh round	Final			
Wrestler	Class	Opposition Result	Opposition Result	Opposition Result	Opposition Result	Opposition Result	Opposition Result	Opposition Result	Match A Opposition Result	Match B Opposition Result	Match C Opposition Result	Rank
Anders Andersen	Middleweight	Kurz (GER); L	Holm (FIN); L	Did not advance								26
Jens Christensen	Light heavyweight	Nilsson (SWE); W	Ahlgren (SWE); L	Barl (AUT); W	Bye	Böhling (FIN); L	Did not advance					6
Johannes Eriksen	Light heavyweight	Wiklund (FIN); L	Fogelmark (SWE); W	Salila (FIN); W	Oehler (GER); W	Rajala (FIN); L	Did not advance					6
Carl Hansen	Featherweight	Andersson (SWE); L	Koskelo (FIN); L	Did not advance								26
Frederik Hansen	Lightweight	Szántó (HUN); W	Márkus (HUN); W	Fischer (AUT); L	Urvikko (FIN); W	Radvány (HUN); L	Did not advance					11
Hvitfeldt Hansen	Middleweight	Johansson (SWE); L	Sint (NED); L	Did not advance								26
Verner Hetmar	Featherweight	Mustonen (FIN); W	Meesits (RUS); W	Haapanen (FIN); L	Schärer (AUT); W	Koskelo (FIN); L	Did not advance					9
Søren Marinus Jensen	Heavyweight	Barrett (GBR); W	Lindfors (FIN); W	Pelander (FIN); W	Saarela (FIN); L	Backenius (FIN); W	Bye	N/A	Saarela (FIN); L	Olin (FIN); L	Did not advance	3rd place, bronze medalist(s)
Otto Nagel	Light heavyweight	Oehler (GER); L	Rajala (FIN); L	Did not advance								20
