= Karel Robětín =

Czech tennis player (1889–1941)

- Full name: Karel Ludvik Fuchs-Robětín
- Born: 25 January 1889; Prague, Austria-Hungary
- Died: 14 October 1941 (aged 52); Marylebone, Greater London, England

Karel Fuchs-Robětín (Czech pronunciation: [ˈkarɛl ˈfuks ˈrobjɛciːn], 25 January 1889 – 14 October 1941) was a Czech tennis and ice hockey player. He competed for Bohemia in tennis at the 1912 Summer Olympics.

== Early life and family ==
Fuchs-Robětín was born 25 January 1889 in Prague to aristocrat Robert Fuchs, proprietor of the paper mill Böhmisch-Kamnitzer Papierfabriken Robert Fuchs in Kamenice and the Holzstoff– und Papierfabrik Robert Fuchs in Haunoldmühle. The company exported paper products worldwide to South America, India, Indonesia, China, Japan, the Middle East and Australia. His father was awarded the Order of the Iron Crown third class. Later for his philanthropic ventures Emperor Franz Josef I also granted him the title of noble, which allowed him to bear the name Robettin (in Czech: Robětín), Roděk or Roněk, compounded with the German prefix "Fuchs Edler von Robbetin", and also a coat of arms. Karel's mother was Hermine von Poster, daughter of the factory owner and wholesaler from Budapest Karl Ludwig Ritter von Poster. Karl had two brothers Herbert and Oswald. The former married Hanna Fuchs-Robettin (née Werfel) an thus she is the sister-in-law of Karel.

Karel studied at the Czech Technical University in Prague and started to play tennis there at his college years.

After World War I the family moved from Austria to Czechoslovakia and officially changed their name to Fuchs-Robětín (a nominal form that was rejected by Austrian Aristocratic department of the ministry before). The father died in 1925 in Prague.

== Tennis career ==
At the age of nineteen he was one of the many Bohemians who competed in the international lawn tennis tournament of the Hungarian Athletics Club of Budapest. In 1919 he was a team member of the inter-club match between LTC Řevnice and LTC Černošice, a tie which they won nine rubbers to five. Karel became a one-time national tennis champion, a feat, which he accomplished in 1920 in singles category. He represented Bohemia at the 1912 Summer Olympics in three events: outdoor singles, outdoor doubles (with Jaromír Zeman), and indoor singles. He was also entered in the indoor doubles event (with Jaroslav Just) but did not play. In 1921 he was a member of the Czechoslovak team facing Belgium but lost both of his rubbers. In 1922 he was a part of a relief match for the Verdun Restoration Fund held at Wimbledon, in which he was defeated by Gerald Patterson in singles and again by Patterson and Rupert Wertheim in doubles with Friedrich Rohrer. The same year he played at the World Hard Court Championships but fell in the first round in singles but reached the quarterfinals of the consolation tournament but was beaten by Marius van der Feen. In doubles he met Henri Cochet and Jean Borotra in the second round but the French world class team proved to be too strong for him and his Czech teammate Pavel Macenauer. In 1923 he entered the World Hard Court Championships again but was eliminated by Roger Danet. In doubles he partnered Ladislav Žemla and lost to the French team of Pierre Canivet and R. Barbas. Despite his initial successes he retired early in 1924 although he did return to court in 1927. In 1930 he was ranked joint 14–15th shared with Felix Pipes on the official Czechoslovak rankings. Next year he slipped to joint 16-17–18th shared with Pipes and Bertrand.

== Ice hockey career ==
Unlike his brothers Karel stayed in his home country after the German occupation of Czechoslovakia in 1938. He kept on practising at I. ČLTK Prague, which also had an ice hockey department. After the occupation of Czechoslovakia, the club life has changed. Surprisingly, in many aspects for the better. As any international sports meetings had ceased including tennis and hockey, which encompassed actually one and the same group of athletes gather daily at the club and diligently trained as domestic competition continued during the war. All this resulted in the season 1940 – 1941 the club's victory over an age-old rival LTC Prague (2:1) and hence triumphed in the Protectorate hockey league. Karel competed there with his son Robă as forwards. Later, ČLTK didn't decline, but the club was held among the best three teams for ten more years. Many of Karel's clubmates and tennis opponents would later gone on to become 1947 World Ice Hockey Champions as part of the Czechoslovakia men's national ice hockey team.

== Personal life ==
Karel finished his studies and became an architect. In 1921 he was the secretary of the Czechoslovak Tennis Association and became the President in 1929 and held the office to 1938. Later he stayed in touch with tennis and devoted himself to design tennis courts including the tennis stadium LTC Praha in Letná.

Apart from the sports interests, the Fuchs-Robětín brothers took over the family business after Robert's death. Karel was appointed the chairman of the Economic Association of Paper Industry in Prague in the meantime. He also served as a chairman of the Technical Museum in Prague.

He wrote a book on tennis, the Jak se naučit hrát tenis dřív než ostatní (How to learn to play tennis before others) and was an editor of the monthly magazine Stolní tenis a tenis (Table tennis and tennis). He also published two economy books relating to timber and paper manufacturing in 1921 and 1933.

He received the Honor of Czechoslovak Physical Education and Sport in 1964.

Karel married Anda Havlíček and they two sons, Robě and Karlíček.

== Works cited ==
=== Books ===
- Floros, Constantin (2001). "Fuchs z Robettina". Alban Berg und Hanna Fuchs. Die Geschichte einer Liebe in Briefen [Alban Berg and Hanna Fuchs. A Love Story in Letters] (in Czech). Zurich, Switzerland: Arche Verlag. ISBN 9783716039038.
- Ganz, Fedor (1983). Inventar vor dem brand (Eine Frau. zwischen zwei Welten) [Inventory before the fire (A woman between two worlds)] (in German). Zurich, Switzerland: Mohrbooks.

=== Online media ===
- Jára Bečka (2009). "O velké partě, "regenerákách" a fotbálku s Pepi Bicanem" [The big team "regeneration" and soccer with Pepi Bican] (PDF). I ČLTK revue (in Czech). Prague, Czech Republic: I. Czech Lawn Tennis Club. p. 44. Archived from the original (PDF) on 4 March 2016.
- "author search:"Karel Robětín"".
- Jindřich König (2002). "100 let řevnického tenisu (1902–2002)" [100 years Řevnice tennis (1902–2002)]. ltcrevnice.cz (in Czech). Řevnice, Czech Republic: Řevnice Tennis Association. Archived from the original (DOC) on 31 July 2017.
- Lubomír Král (25 November 2009). "Historie sportu v Písku – TENIS" [The history of sport in Písek – TENNIS]. icpisek.cz (in Czech). Prague, Czech Republic: Písek District council. Archived from the original on 18 July 2013.
- Miloslav Trnka (15 January 2013). "Olympionik Karel Ardelt nepřišel na svět v Praze, ale v Písku" [Olympian Karel Ardelt wasn't born in Prague but in Písek] (PDF). Rodopisná revue (in Czech). Prague, Czech Republic: rodopisna-revue-online.tode.cz/.
- Evans, Hilary; Gjerde, Arild; Heijmans, Jeroen; Mallon, Bill; et al. "Karel Robětín". Olympics at Sports-Reference.com. Sports Reference LLC. Archived from the original on 3 December 2016.
- Wolf Reinhardt. "Olympische Sommerspiele" [Summer Olympic Games]. reinhardt-consult.de (in German). Bonn, Germany. Archived from the original (XLS) on 4 March 2016.

=== Periodicals ===
- "Le championnat du monde de tennis" [World Tennis Championships]. Le Petit Parisien (in French) (16, 884). Paris, France: Paul Dupuy: 2. 22 May 1923.
- "Ivo Kaderka" (PDF). TK Plus Magazine (in Czech). Prostějov, Czech Republic. p. 4.
- Petr Novotný, ed. (2002). "Česká Kamenice aneb zde bývala papírna" [Czech Kamenice where used to be a paper mill] (PDF). Packaging magazine (in Czech). Prague, Czech Republic: Richtr & Co. p. 37.
- "Lawn-Tennis" (PDF). L'Express du Midi (in French). 32 (11, 042). Toulouse, France: Cibiel Family: 2. 23 May 1923.
- "Games at Wimbledon". The Evening Post. CIV (14). Wellington, New Zealand: Blundell Bros Limited: 11. 17 July 1922.
- "A MAC. V.-ik nemzetközi lawn-tenis versenye" [The Fifth International lawn-tennis tournament of MAC] (in Hungarian). Budapest, Hungary: Huszadik Század. June 1908.
- Béla Kehrling, ed. (28 June 1930). "Külföldi hírek" [International news] (PDF). Tennisz és Golf (in Hungarian). II (12). Budapest, Hungary: Bethlen Gábor írod. és Nyomdai Rt: 228.
- Béla Kehrling, ed. (10 January 1931). "Külföldi hírek" [International news] (PDF). Tennisz és Golf (in Hungarian). III (1). Budapest, Hungary: Bethlen Gábor írod. és Nyomdai Rt: 17.
- "Belgium Wins Series" (PDF). Brooklyn Daily Eagle. 81 (192). Brooklyn, New York, United States: M. Preston Goodfellow: C/3. 13 July 1921.
- "De Tennis-Wereldkampioenschappen te Brussel" [The World Tennis Championships of Brussels] (PDF). De Sumatra Post (in Dutch). 24 (137). Medan: J. Hallermann: 5. 16 June 1922.
- J. Von Straten, ed. (19 May 1922). "De Tennis-Wereldkampioenschappen te Brussel" [The World Tennis Championships of Brussels] (PDF). Rotterdams Nieuwsblad (in Dutch). No. 13, 541. Rotterdam, Netherlands: Albertus Willem Sijthoff. p. 7.
