= List of flag bearers for Bohemia at the Olympics =

Bohemia at the Olympics
- IOC code: BOH
- NOC: Czech Olympic Committee
- Medals: Gold 0 Silver 1 Bronze 3 Total 4

Summer appearances
- 1900; 1904; 1908; 1912

Other related appearances
- 1906 Intercalated Games –––– Czechoslovakia (1920–1992); Czech Republic (1994–)

This is a list of flag bearers who have represented Bohemia at the Olympics.

Flag bearers carry the national flag of their country at the opening ceremony of the Olympic Games.

#	Event year	Season	Flag bearer	Sport
1	1908	Summer	Miroslav Šustera	Track & Field
2	1912	Summer	Jiří Kodl	Tennis

== See also ==
- Bohemia at the Olympics
