= Édouard Mény de Marangue =

French tennis player

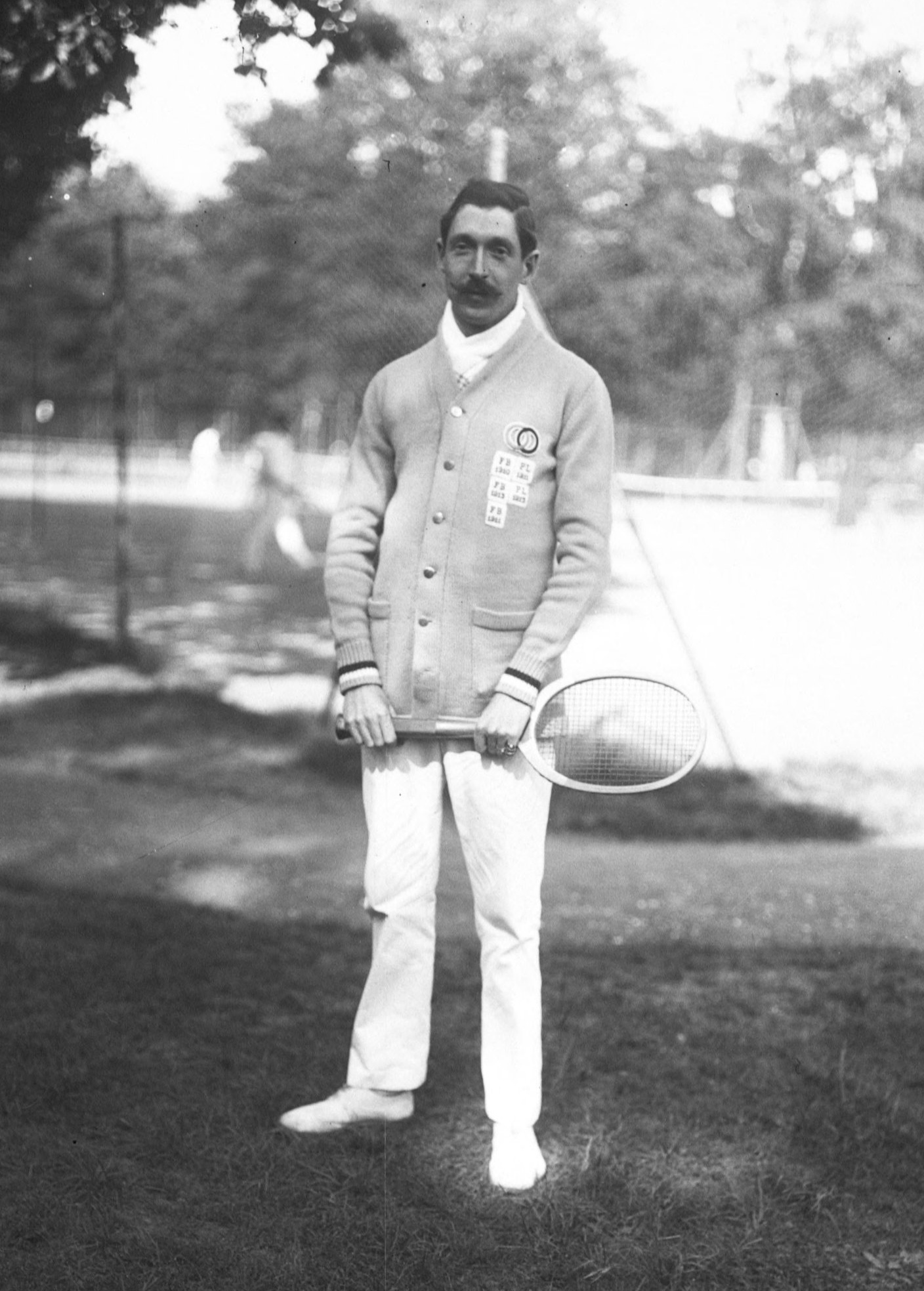
- Full name: Édouard Marie Marc Mény de Marangue
- Born: 30 November 1882; Paris, France
- Died: 23 January 1960 (aged 77); Beaulieu-sur-Mer, France
Medal record
Representing France
Men's Tennis
Olympic Games
Bronze medal – third place	1912 Stockholm	Doubles

Édouard Marie Marc Mény de Marangue (30 November 1882 – 23 January 1960) was a French tennis player who competed in the 1912 Summer Olympics.

In 1912, he won the bronze medal with his partner Albert Canet in the outdoor doubles event. He also competed in the outdoor singles competition but was eliminated in the first round.
