= Lionel Tapscott =

South African cricketer and tennis player (1894–1934)

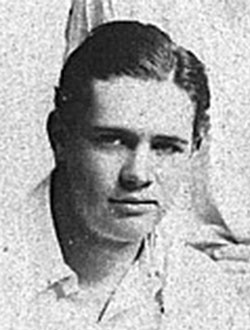

Personal information
- Full name: Lionel Eric Tapscott
- Born: 18 March 1894; Kimberley, Cape Colony
- Died: 7 July 1934 (aged 40); Kenilworth, Cape Town, South Africa
- Nickname: Doodles
- Batting: Right-handed
- Bowling: Right-arm
- Role: Batsman
- Relatives: George Tapscott (brother); Billie Tapscott (sister)

International information
- National side: South Africa
- Test debut (cap 108): 9 February 1923 v England
- Last Test: 16 February 1923 v England

Career statistics
Competition	Test	First-class
Matches	2	39
Runs scored	58	1,759
Batting average	29.00	26.25
100s/50s	0/1	2/10
Top score	50*	102
Balls bowled	12	1,502
Wickets	0	34
Bowling average	–	23.91
5 wickets in innings	–	1
10 wickets in match	–	0
Best bowling	–	6/35
Catches/stumpings	0/–	19/–
- Source: CricketArchive, 8 October 2019

Lionel Eric "Doodles" Tapscott (18 March 1894 – 7 July 1934) was a South African cricketer who played in two Test matches in 1923.

He was born on 18 March 1894 at Kimberley, Cape Colony.

Outside of cricket, Tapscott excelled at tennis and represented South Africa at the 1912 Summer Olympics. He made it to the Round of 16 before losing a five set match to Bohemian Ladislav Žemla-Rázný.

His brother, George, also played Test cricket for South Africa, and his sister Billie was a tennis player who reached the quarterfinals at the French Championships and Wimbledon.

He died on 7 July 1934 at Kenilworth, Cape Town.
