= Olaf Meyland-Smith =

Danish cyclist

Personal information
- Born: 23 July 1882 Fraugde, Odense County, Denmark
- Died: 26 November 1924 (aged 42) Sundby, Copenhagen, Denmark

Cycling career
- Sport: Cycling

Olaf Meyland-Smith (23 July 1882 – 26 November 1924) was a Danish road racing cyclist who competed in the 1912 Summer Olympics. He was born in Fraugde, Odense County and died in Sundby, Copenhagen.

In 1912, he was a member of the Danish cycling team, which finished eighth in the team time trial event. In the individual time trial competition he finished 25th.
