= Paul Lindpaintner =

German tennis player

- Born: 22 May 1883 Munich, German Empire
- Died: 23 April 1969 (aged 85) Tegernsee, West Germany

Paul Lindpaintner (22 May 1883 – 23 April 1969) was a German tennis player. He competed in the men's outdoor singles event at the 1912 Summer Olympics.

As an amateur art dealer, Lindpaintner traveled extensively throughout Europe. From 1928, he was a partner of Johannes Hinrichsen (1884–1971) in the Hinrichsen and Lindpaintner art dealership in Berlin, located on Bellevuestrasse. He was involved in Nazi-looted art operations in France. In 1939, he facilitated sales from the collection of the art dealer Jean Seligmann in Paris. From 1941 to 1944, he worked for the Munich antiques dealer Fritz Pössenbacher (1906–1990) in Paris, using his connections to sell to Nazi dignitaries. Even after the war, he continued to work as an antiques dealer in Tegernsee and Munich. The Art Looting Investigation Unit investigated Lindpaintner, and included him in its "Red Flag" list.

His marriage to Maria Wegmann (1887–1970) produced three children: Maria da Gloria Lindpaintner (* 1911), who married Otto Pössenbacher in 1937, Ludwig Moritz Lindpaintner (* 1914) and Victoria Lindpaintner (1918–1965). The latter competed in the 1936 Olympics and was a figure skater.
