= Charles Wennergren =

Swedish tennis player (1889–1978)

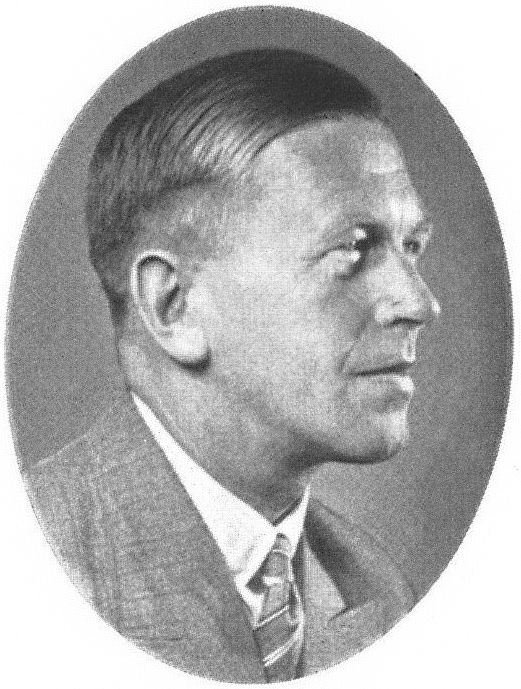
- Full name: Sven Charles Otto Wennergren
- Born: 7 February 1889 Gothenburg, Sweden
- Died: 3 January 1978 (aged 88) Linköping, Sweden
- Plays: Right-handed

Singles
- WCCC: 1R (1913)
- Olympic Games: 4R (1912)

Doubles

Other doubles tournaments
- Olympic Games: QF (1912, 1924)

Mixed doubles
- Olympic Games: 1R (1924)

Team competitions
- Davis Cup: 2R (Europe) (1928)

Sven Charles Otto Wennergren (7 February 1889 – 3 January 1978) was a Swedish tennis player who competed at the 1912 and 1924 Summer Olympics.

== Tennis career ==
Wennergren made an impact in 1911 when he won the Swedish International Championships at the age of 22. He marched through names such as Gunnar Setterwall, Hakon Leffler and Carl-Olof Nylén to clinch the title. The same year he was crowned the national singles champion as well, which he later repeated five more times.

He represented his country in the 1912 Summer Olympics, competing in men's singles and doubles. He and Carl-Olof Nylén reached the quarter-finals in men's doubles, losing to Harry Kitson and Charles Winslow of South Africa, who went on to win the gold medal. In singles competition, he won his first three matches and lost in the fourth round to Count Ludwig von Salm-Hoogstraeten, who was representing Austria.

He entered the 1913 World Covered Court Championships when it was held in Stockholm, Sweden. He subsequently lost in the early rounds to eventual champion Anthony Wilding. In 1915 he won the National Indoors Doubles Championships with Nylén and the outdoors in 1916 partnering John Söderström. He was a one-time Danish covered courts champion by winning the 1921 mixed doubles alongside home favorite Agnete Goldschmidt. In 1924 he was a runner-up for the Swedish National Championships both in singles and in doubles lost both times to Henning Müller.

Also in 1924, he participated in his second Olympic Games, competing in men's singles, men's doubles, and mixed doubles. He won his first singles match but lost his second-round match. His partner in men's doubles was Henning Müller; the pair reached the quarter-finals, where they lost to the eventual winners of the bronze medal, Jean Borotra and René Lacoste of France. In mixed doubles, he was partnered with Lily Strömberg-von Essen; they lost their first-round match.

In 1926 he was selected into the team, which faced the touring Davis Cup champion French team. He was sent to action in singles against Jacques Brugnon and in doubles against Brugnon and Jean Richard le Besnerais, but lost in both matches. There was also a mixed double contest, that he was a part of, where he was also defeated by the duo of Mrs. le Besnerais and Brugnon. Wennergren was also a national mixed doubles champion, which he claimed in 1927 alongside Sigrid Fick. In Davis Cup he was drafted once in 1928 playing doubles with Sune Malmström against Czechoslovakia, a tie they lost.

== Personal life ==
Wennergren was born on 7 February 1889 to Carl Otto Wennergren, a wholesaler, and Maria Lind. He was a tax affairs chairman, and länsassessor at the Länsstyrelse from 1916. He primarily supervised the management of bank savings. He married Sigrid Ingeborg Axner and they had two children, Bertil and Margareta. His son later became a Swedish Parliamentary Ombudsman and Justice of the Swedish Supreme Administrative Court and published several books related to legal issues.
