= Otto von Müller =

German tennis player

- Born: 17 October 1875 Jülich, German Empire
- Died: 2 April 1976 (aged 100) Grafrath, West Germany

Otto von Müller (German pronunciation: [ˈɔtoː fɔn ˈmʏlɐ]; born the 17th October 1875 in Jülich and died the 2nd April 1976 in Fürstenfeldbruck) was a German tennis player. He competed in two events at the 1912 Summer Olympics.

== Career ==
Military

After attending the Luisengymnasium in Berlin, Müller joined the 1st Foot Guard Regiment of the Prussian Army on October 1, 1892, and was promoted to second lieutenant by the end of January 1894. For further training, he graduated from the War Academy in 1900/03, rose to the rank of lieutenant in mid-April 1903, and was commanded from the end of July to the end of September 1903 to serve in the 1st Battalion in the Foot Artillery Regiment "von Hindersin" (1st Pomeranian) No. 2 . From April 1, 1905, his command was followed by a year of service with the Great General Staff. This command was extended until he was promoted to Hauptmann and transferred to the officers assigned to the General Staff on March 21, 1908. On April 10, 1908, Müller was appointed adjutant to the Oberquartiermeister and transferred to the General Staff of the Army at the end of March of the following year, being transferred to the General Staff. From April 20, 1909, to March 21, 1910, he was on the General Staff of the VIII Army Corps and then returned to his main regiment with the appointment as Chief of the 8th Company. In 1913, he joined the General Staff of the 21st Division in Frankfurt am Main.

From June 30, 1914, Müller was personal adjutant to the last German Crown Prince, Wilhelm of Prussia, until he took his leave on November 26, 1918. In this capacity, he was promoted to major on August 19, 1914, after the start of World War I.

By May 6, 1914, Müller had been awarded the following medals and decorations:

- Order of the Red Eagle IV Class
- Order of the Crown IV Class
- Knight of Honor of the Order of St. John
- Knight 2nd Class of the Ducal Saxe-Ernestine House Order
- Knight of the Golden Cross of the Greek Order of the Redeemer

Athletic

At the Olympic Games 1912 in Stockholm, Müller participated in the tennis singles and doubles competition on the lawn. He reached the quarterfinals in singles with three straight victories but was eliminated there against Ladislav Žemla from Bohemia, who later participated in the Olympics. With Heinrich Schomburgk, he clearly survived the first round of the doubles competition, but in the round of 16, they lost out in four sets against the French Édouard Mény de Marangue and Albert Canet, who later won the bronze medal.

He was an active tennis player from 1897 to 1933. In 1913, he played against Schomburgk in the final of the International German Championships in Hamburg. He played almost exclusively in German tournaments, with a break from 1913 to 1925.

Müller was the first German Olympian to live to be over 100 years old. When he died in April 1976, he was 100 years and about 6 months old.

== Origin and family ==
The family originates from Mecklenburg-Schwerin and begins the lineage with Adam Möller († 1693), who was Amtmann in Redentin near Wismar from 1689. His parents were the Prussian Lieutenant General Eduard von Müller (1841-1932) and his wife Marie, née Schweickhardt (* 1850).Otto von Müller married Olly Wessel on October 2, 1905 in Potsdam. The marriage produced the children Irmgard Ingeborg (* 1906) and Wolfgang (* 1910). The coat of arms of the family was split; on the right in silver a half black crested wheel at the split, on the left in green a golden lion; on the helmet on the right with blue-silver, on the left with green-silver decoes a growing golden lion.

== See also ==
- List of centenarians (sportspeople)
