= Bjarne Angell =

Norwegian tennis player

- Born: 27 April 1888 Oslo, Norway
- Died: 12 December 1938 (aged 50) Oslo, Norway

Bjarne Angell (27 April 1888 – 12 December 1938) was a Norwegian tennis player. He competed in the men's outdoor doubles' event at the 1912 Summer Olympics.
