= Ludwig von Salm-Hoogstraeten =

Austrian tennis player (1885–1944)

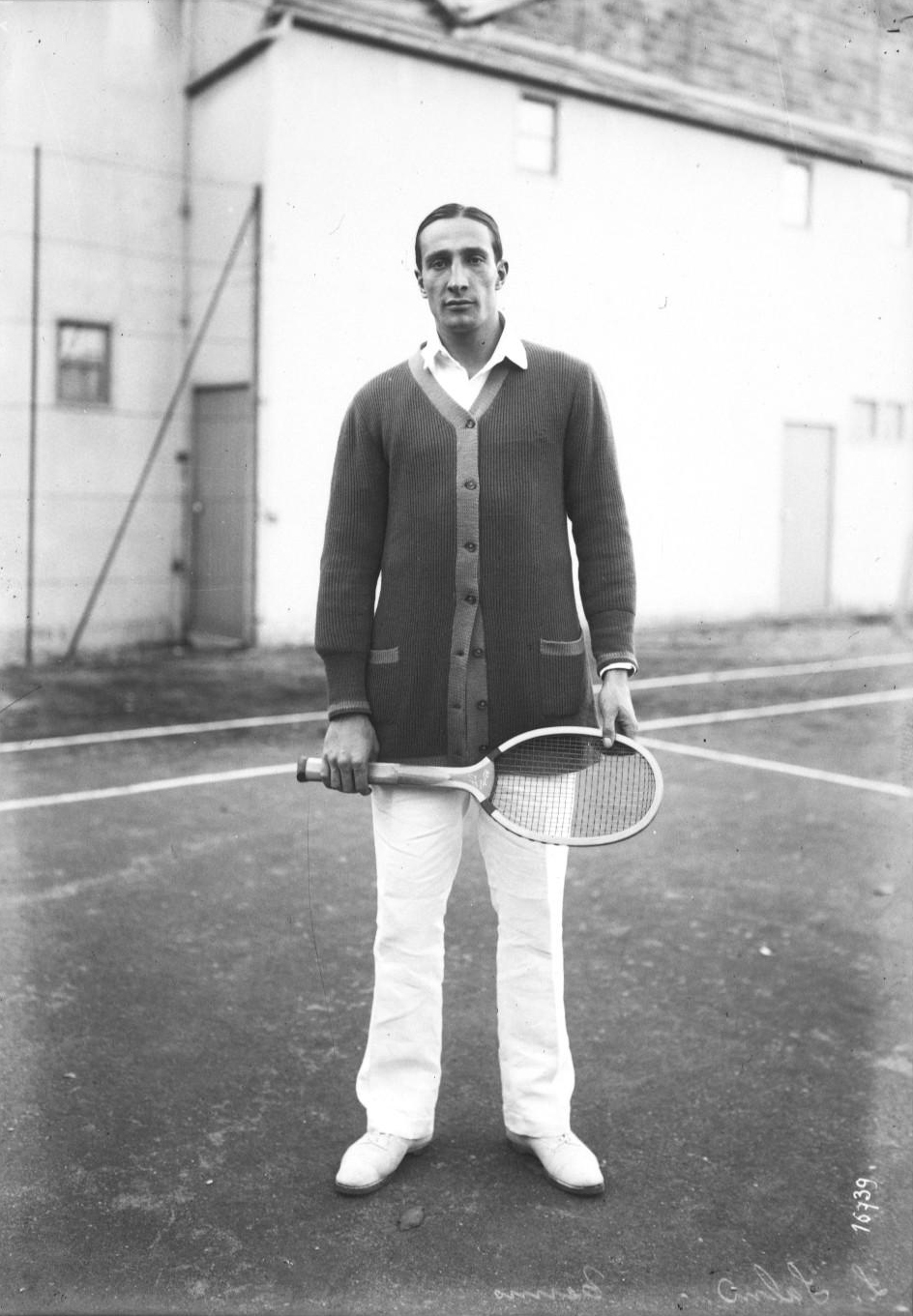
- Full name: Ludwig Albrecht Constantin Maria von Salm Hoogstraeten
- Country (sports): Austria-Hungary; Austria
- Born: 24 February 1885 Bad Homburg vor der Höhe, German Empire
- Died: 23 July 1944 (aged 59) Budapest, Hungary
- Turned pro: 1910 (amateur tour)
- Retired: 1932
- Plays: Right-handed (one-handed backhand)

Grand Slam singles results
- French Open: 3R (1926)
- Wimbledon: 2R (1913)
- US Open: 1R (1907)
- French Open Senior: F (1931)

Other tournaments
- WHCC: F (1914)
- Olympic Games: QF (1912)

Grand Slam doubles results
- Wimbledon: 1R (1913, 1929, 1930)

Grand Slam mixed doubles results
- Wimbledon: 3R (1913)

Other mixed doubles tournaments
- WHCC: F (1914)

Team competitions
- Davis Cup: QF (1925^{Eu})

Count Ludwig von Salm-Hoogstraeten (German pronunciation: [ˈluːtvɪç fɔn ˈzalm ˈhoːkˌʃtʁaːtn̩]; Hungarian: Salm Lajos [sɒlm ˈlɒjoʃ]; 24 February 1885 – 23 July 1944), nicknamed "Ludi", was an Austrian tennis player of the pre-Open Era. He competed in the men's outdoor singles event at the 1912 Summer Olympics. He reached the quarterfinal in which he lost to South African Harold Kitson in straight sets.

Salm-Hoogstraeten played in six ties for the Austrian Davis Cup team between 1924 and 1928 and compiled a record of four wins and eight losses.

== Early life and family ==
Count Salm was born on 24 February 1885 in Bad Homburg vor der Höhe, Germany, to Count Alfred von Salm-Hoogstraeten, a Prussian cavalry officer in the Franco-Prussian War, and Baroness Adolphine von Erlanger. He had three brothers, Alfred, Otto and Alexander. The latter two were also tennis players and formed a doubles team, were Austrian champions and competed in the 1914 US Indoor Championships. His family held an estate at Reichenau, Lower Austria, and as the oldest child, he was the first in line to inherit it.

== Tennis career ==
=== 1910–1914 ===
Ludwig von Salm was particularly successful in doubles competitions. His pre-World War I career included a mixed final in the Les Avants tournament with Miss Turner, which he lost to Eric Pockley and Miss Brook-Smith. In April 1911 he won the San Remo doubles together with Anthony Wilding after defeating the German duo of Curt Bergmann and Friedrich Rahe. The same month they split for the Croquet et Lawn-Tennis Club de Cannes championships, Wilding played with A. Wallis Myers, Salm chose Robert Kleinschroth, and the four of them met in the semifinal, which was won by Wilding and Myers. In 1912 he was a singles runner-up for the Biarritz Golf Club tournament, losing to Rahe; however, he was still successful in doubles, winning the inaugural Russian Championships doubles pairing with home favorite Mikhail Sumarokov-Elston. In 1913, he was a doubles semifinalist in the Monaco tournament with French netman Max Decugis but ceded the victory to Kleinschroth and Rahe in a straight two-set match. In 1914, pairing again with Wilding, they clinched the Cannes doubles title by beating Decugis and Gordon Lowe. At Nice, Wilding and Craig Biddle defeated Salm and Gordon Lowe. The same year, he was the finalist for the World Hard Court Championships mixed doubles and the French Championships doubles. In the former with Suzanne Lenglen, he was routed by Elizabeth Ryan and Max Decugis. In the latter, he and William Laurentz fell in the challenge round to title defenders Max Decugis and Maurice Germot.

Although he only reached the second round of the Wimbledon singles in 1913, he did better in the All England Plate, a consolation tournament for losing participants, where he was eliminated by Horace Rice in the fourth round. In 1914, Salm achieved his biggest achievement in the French Championships by advancing to the All Comers' final of the tournament, where he was forced to give up the contest to Jean Samazeuilh at the fifth set due to fatigue. A week later he reached the final of the World Hard Court Championships, losing to Anthony Wilding in straight sets.

=== 1920–1930, on-court controversies ===
After the war, he made his comeback at the 1920 German International Tennis Championships, winning the doubles title with Oscar Kreuzer. In 1924, the French Riviera tennis clubs refused him entry to their championships for his lack of sportsmanship. In 1925, his playing license was suspended by the Austrian Lawn Tennis Federation for failing to show up at an international match in Breslau (this ban was lifted a couple of years later). During that season, he violated the attitude code on several occasions. In a Viennese doubles match, he insulted his recurring partner Suzanne Lenglen to the point that she dropped her racquet and quit the match. He also provoked Irish player Charles Scroope in a Davis Cup meeting by constantly questioning the umpire's decisions.

In 1926, he reached the quarterfinals of the French International Hard Court Championship partnering Béla von Kehrling; they were defeated by eventual victors Howard Kinsey and Vincent Richards. Also in 1926, he won the Rot-Weiss Tennis Club of Berlin tournament, a victory which caused a major scandal. Count Salm verbally abused his 18-old opponent Herman Wetzel, who then walked off the court in the second set. The judges overruled the first decision and awarded the match to Salm, reasoning that Wetzel had voluntarily left the court. It was the second time within a year that Salm's misbehavior stirred international controversy, and as a result, an official ban was requested to deny him access to tournaments. On another occasion in 1928, while he was participating in the mixed doubles at Cannes, he drew attention when he walked off the court in outrage during a match after a ball flew in from outside, distracting him so that he lost the point. He came back when he heard the laughter of the spectators. His partner, Blanche Gladys Duddell, wife of Edward Murray Colston, 2nd Baron Roundway, was upset by the count's actions, and her husband officially protested during this interruption to ensure that the rules prevented the count from leaving the court again.

In 1928 at New Courts Club tournament in Cannes, Salm partnered with Austrian champion Hermann von Artens and won the doubles without losing a set. In 1929, the Austrian team pushed to the semifinals of the South of France Championships, where they were stopped by René Gallèpe and Charles Aeschlimann. In 1930, he claimed the Austrian International Championships doubles, teaming up with eventual world number one Bill Tilden. He was also runner-up in Ostend, Venice, and Merano with three different partners. In 1931, he earned a second place at the veterans' singles of the French Championships granting a flawless two straight sets victory to Briton Leighton Crawford.

== World Championships finals ==
=== Singles (1 runner-up) ===
Result	Year	Championship	Surface	Opponent	Score
Loss	1914	World Hard Court Championships	Clay	(New Zealand) Anthony Wilding	0–6, 2–6, 4–6

== Personal life and death ==
During World War I, Count von Salm-Hoogstraeten served as a dragoon officer in the Austrian Army and as a military aide to the governor of Vienna. After the war he settled in Vienna, where he lost much of his fortune and properties over card games held at the Jockey Club. He married his first wife, Anne-Marie von Kramsta, on 30 June 1909. His second marriage, on 8 January 1924, was to American heiress Millicent Rogers and produced one son, but the couple had divorced before he was born. Apart from playing tennis, he occasionally acted in movies because his friend Count Alexander Kolowrat, who was a film producer and owner of Sascha-Film. His director Mihály Kertész encouraged Kolowrat to offer Salm movie roles and hire him.

He was cast in three feature films alongside Lucy Doraine, including the Masters of the Sea and A Vanished World. In 1929, he published a book dedicated to his son, Peter, titled Mein lieber Peter ... beichte eines vaters. While living in Austria, he gave private tennis etiquette and fair-play lessons to Viennese children. After his financial breakdown, Salm moved to Budapest and started a wine business. He rented and lived in a second-story room in the Hotel Dunapalota-Ritz.

On 1 March 1939, The New York Times reported that Count von Salm-Hoostraeten petitioned the court for annual allowances totaling $30,000 from the estate of his then 14-year-old son Peter Salm. $20,000 a year was requested to support the count and his elderly mother, with an additional $10,000 a year to support the expenses of visitation from his son. The Count admitted that he did not visit with his son following the divorce of Count von Salm-Hoogstraeten and Peter's mother, Millicent Rogers Balcolm. On 25 May 1939, Supreme Court Justice William T. Collins denied the Count's request for an annual allowance from his son's estate. The court ruled that there was "no authority in law or foundation in equity" for granting the application. They contended that there was no legal or moral duty for Peter to contribute to his father's support, and that it was unnecessary to subsidize the father so that the father may spend time with his son. The court also added that the count failed to establish that he was indigent and unable to earn a living.

On 23 July 1944, he jumped off the hotel balcony onto the Danube Promenade and died immediately. According to the Winona Daily News, he did so because the Nazis had arrived on the scene to arrest him for his Jewish ancestry. According to his friend Sidney Wood, the root cause behind his suicide was that the Nazi regime pressured him to engage in espionage, which he refused to do and thus the SS wanted to hunt him down. However, according to the Jewish Criterion, he was a Nazi collaborator and avid anti-Semite and chose to end his life in fear of post-war reprisals. He was buried on 28 July 1944; his funeral became a social affair.

== Ancestry ==
Ancestors of Ludwig von Salm-Hoogstraeten

16. Maximilian Friedrich, Prince of Salm-Salm
8. Prince Konstantine Alexander of Salm-Salm
17. Landgravine Marie Luise of Hesse-Rheinfels-Rotenburg
4. Count Albrecht Friedrich von Salm-Hoogstraeten
9. Catherine Bender (Madam Salm de Loon)
2. Count Alfred Wilhelm von Salm-Hoogstraeten
10. Count Karl Wilhelm von Bohlen
5. Countess Luise von Bohlen
11. Henriette Auguste von Ingersleben
1. Count Ludwig von Salm-Hoogstraeten
24. Ludwig Moritz Erlanger
12. Baron Raphael von Erlanger
6. Baron Victor Alexander von Erlanger
26. Johann Valentin Albert
13. Ida Mary Albert
3. Baroness Adolphine von Erlanger
7. Henriette von Bognar

== See also ==
- Salm Island
- Hoogstraten

== Works cited ==
=== Online media ===
- "Count Ludi Salm". Internet Movie Database.
- "Ludwig von Salm-Hoogstraeten Olympic Results". sports-reference.com. Archived from the original on 18 April 2020.
- Mein lieber Peter ... beichte eines vaters. OCLC. OCLC 18569452 – via WorldCat.
- "Die Doppelsieger seit 1902" [Doubles Champions since 1902]. Norddeutscher Rundfunk (in German). ARD.
- "Count Mikhail Sumarokov-Elston – Tennis – Russian Sport – Biographies". RusArtNet.com. Archived from the original on 4 March 2016.
- "Sensation caused by appearance of Count Salm". Getty Images. Carlyle Group. 24 June 1929.
- "Ludwig Salm". The Championships, Wimbledon. All England Lawn Tennis and Croquet Club.

=== Books ===
- United States Lawn Tennis Association (1931). American Lawn Tennis (25 ed.). American Lawn Tennis Publishing Company.
- Benoit, Arthur (1878). Une page inédite de l'histoire de la principauté de Salm [An unedited page in the history of the Salm principality] (PDF) (in French). Archived from the original (PDF) on 4 March 2016.
- Niemann, A, ed. (1872). "Salm-Salm". Almanach de Gotha (in French). Justus Perthes.
- Varnhagen, Rahel (2001). Briefwechsel mit Ludwig Robert (in German). C.H.Beck. ISBN 9783406482564.
- Bergvall, Erik (1913). The Fifth Olympiad – The Official Report (of) The Olympic Games of 1912 (PDF). London, United Kingdom: The Swedish Olympic Committee.
- Wood, Sidney (2011). The Wimbledon Final That Never Was... New Chapter Press. ISBN 9780942257847. Archived from the original on 9 August 2013.

=== Periodicals ===
- Béla Kehrling, ed. (3 April 1931). "Lapzárta után kapott jelentések" [Fudges] (PDF). Tennisz és Golf (in Hungarian). III (7). Budapest, Hungary: Egyesült Kő-, Könyvnyomda, Könyv- és Lapkiadó Rt: 105.
- "Miért lett öngyilkos gróf Salm Lajos?" [Why did Count Ludwig von Salm commit suicide?] (in Hungarian). Budapest, Hungary: Huszadik Század. July 1944.
- "Will Pat Guiness Get the Aga Khan?". Winona Daily News. Winona, Minnesota, United States: Lee Enterprises: 38. 11 May 1969.
- "Lawn tennis". The Evening Post (135). Wellington, New Zealand: Blundell Bros Limited: 7. 9 June 1914.
- "Lawn tennis". The Evening Post (116). Wellington, New Zealand: Blundell Bros Limited: 14. 12 November 1910.
- "Lawn tennis". New Zealand Herald (14645). Auckland, New Zealand: Wilson & Horton: 8. 3 April 1911. ISSN 1170-0777.
- "Wilding and Brookes". Auckland Star (87). Auckland, New Zealand: 5. 13 April 1914.
- "Lawn tennis". The Evening Post (3). Wellington, New Zealand: Blundell Bros Limited: 7. 3 July 1913.
- Béla Kehrling, ed. (24 May 1930). "Külföldi hírek" [International news] (PDF). Tennisz és Golf (in Hungarian). II (10). Budapest, Hungary: Bethlen Gábor írod. és Nyomdai Rt: 174, 179, 182.
- Béla Kehrling, ed. (30 August 1930). "Külföldi hírek" [International news] (PDF). Tennisz és Golf (in Hungarian). II (16). Budapest, Hungary: Bethlen Gábor Irod. és Nyomdai RT: 322.
- François Coty, ed. (17 September 1930). "Tennis". Le Figaro (in French) (260). Paris, France: Dassault Group: 7. ISSN 0182-5852.
- François Coty, ed. (21 September 1912). "Tennis". Le Figaro (in French) (265). Paris, France: Dassault Group: 5. ISSN 0182-5852.
- François Coty, ed. (22 May 1914). "Lawn-Tennis". Le Figaro (in French) (142). Paris, France: Dassault Group: 5. ISSN 0182-5852.
- François Coty, ed. (26 May 1914). "Lawn-Tennis". Le Figaro (in French) (146). Paris, France: Dassault Group: 7. ISSN 0182-5852.
- Béla Kehrling, ed. (22 October 1930). "Külföldi hírek" [International news] (PDF). Tennisz és Golf (in Hungarian). II (19–20). Budapest, Hungary: Bethlen Gábor Irod. és Nyomdai R.T.: 375.
- "Collaborationist Suicides To Escape Judgment Day". Jewish Criterion. Pittsburgh, United States: Pittsburgh Jewish Newspaper Project. 28 July 1944.
- "Lawn-Tennis" (PDF). La Vanguardia (in Spanish). Barcelona, Spain: Carlos Godó Valls: 5. 9 June 1914.
- "Maud Coster will wed Austrian count" (PDF). The New York Times. 21 April 1916.
- "Olympic Invitation to Austria Made in Good Faith, French Say". The New York Times. 1924.
- "Austrian count is ordered home" (PDF). Ogden Standard. 44 (209). Ogden, Utah, United States: William Glasmann: 1. 28 July 1914.
- "Lawn tennis". Wairarapa Daily Times (11931). Masterton, New Zealand: 5. 19 March 1914.
- "Lawn-Tennis" (PDF). Le Littoral (in French). 27. Cannes, France: Fortuné Robaudy: 1. 3 April 1911.
- "Richard Kinsey win" (PDF). The Auburn Citizen. Auburn, New York, United States: Lee Enterprises: 1. 7 June 1926. ISSN 0738-7520.
- "Count Salm again in tennis mixup". The Montreal Gazette. CLV (128). Montreal, Quebec, Canada: 8. 29 May 1926.
- "Tennis fans get big laugh when Salm airs peeve". The Milwaukee Journal. 46. Milwaukee, Wisconsin, United States: 16. 27 March 1928.
- "Tennis League Suspends Salm". Hartford Courant. Hartford, Connecticut, United States: Hartford Courant Co. 10 July 1925.
- "Salm "in Dutch" in tennis circles". Spokane Daily Chronicle. 40 (71). Spokane, Washington, United States: 2. 10 December 1925.
- François Coty, ed. (28 February 1913). "Tennis". Le Figaro (in French) (59). Paris, France: Dassault Group: 8. ISSN 0182-5852.
- François Coty, ed. (18 March 1929). "Tennis". Le Figaro (in French) (77). Paris, France: Dassault Group: 4. ISSN 0182-5852.
- Cunliffe-Owen, Marguerite (19 June 1923). "Tales of the Old World" (PDF). The Sun and the Globe. XC (247). New York City, United States: 21.
- "Unexpected Upsets Scored in First International Net Tourney at Cannes, France" (PDF). New York Evening Post. 127 (40). New York City, United States: Edwin Francis Gay: 17. 8 February 1928.
- Béla Kehrling, ed. (6 June 1931). "Párizsi Nemzetközi Bajnokságok" [French International Championships] (PDF). Tennisz és Golf (in Hungarian). III (11–12). Budapest, Hungary: Egyesült Kő-, Könyvnyomda. Könyv- és Lapkiadó Rt.: 198.
