= Willem Stibolt =

Norwegian tennis player

- Born: 9 June 1890; Drammen, Norway
- Died: 5 April 1964 (aged 73); Oslo, Norway

Willem Stibolt (9 June 1890 – 5 April 1964) was a Norwegian tennis player. He competed in two events at the 1912 Summer Olympics.
