= Jørgen Arenholt =

Danish tennis player (1876–1953)

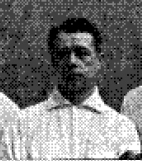
- Country (sports): Denmark
- Born: 14 December 1876 Copenhagen, Denmark
- Died: 27 July 1953 (aged 76) Copenhagen, Denmark

Grand Slam singles results
- Wimbledon: 1R (1910)

Other tournaments
- Olympic Games: 1R (1912)

Grand Slam doubles results
- Wimbledon: 2R (1910)

Other doubles tournaments
- Olympic Games: 1R (1912)

Jørgen Arenholt (14 December 1876 – 27 July 1953) was a Danish tennis player and medical doctor. He competed in two events at the 1912 Summer Olympics.

He was married to Julie Arenholt née Rosengreen (10 December 1873 – 21 July 1952), a Danish civil engineer, women's rights activist and politician.
