= Leó von Baráth =

Hungarian tennis player

- Born: 9 June 1891; Budapest, Hungary

Leó von Baráth (born 9 June 1891, date of death unknown) was a Hungarian tennis player. He competed in two events at the 1912 Summer Olympics.
