= Daniel Lawton =

French tennis player

Personal information
- Nationality: French
- Born: 27 November 1881 Cantenac, France
- Died: 27 March 1979 (aged 97) Bordeaux, France

Sport
- Sport: Tennis

Daniel Édouard Lawton (27 November 1881 – 27 March 1979) was a French tennis player. He competed in the men's doubles event at the 1920 Summer Olympics.
