= Jiří Kodl =

Czech tennis player (1889–1955)

- Born: 3 April 1889; Písek, Austria-Hungary
- Died: 29 October 1955 (aged 66)

Jiří Kodl (3 April 1889 – 29 October 1955) was a Czech tennis player. He competed for Bohemia in the men's outdoor singles event at the 1912 Summer Olympics. He was the flag bearer for Bohemia at the 1912 Games.
