= Herman Bjørklund =

Norwegian tennis player

- Born: 29 April 1883; Oslo, Norway
- Died: 15 March 1960 (aged 76); Oslo, Norway

Herman Bjørklund (29 April 1883 – 15 March 1960) was a Norwegian tennis player. He competed in two events at the 1912 Summer Olympics.
