= Richard Peterson (tennis) =

Norwegian tennis player

- Full name: Richard Kang Paterson
- Born: 9 March 1884; Oslo, Norway
- Died: 2 April 1967 (aged 83); Oslo, Norway

Richard Peterson (9 March 1884 – 2 April 1967) was a Norwegian tennis player. He competed in two events at the 1912 Summer Olympics.
