= Trygve Smith (tennis) =

Norwegian tennis player

- Born: 20 September 1880; Oslo, Norway
- Died: 10 November 1948 (aged 68); Oslo, Norway

Trygve Smith (20 September 1880 – 10 November 1948) was a Norwegian tennis player. He competed in two events at the 1912 Summer Olympics.
