= Arthur Zborzil =

Austrian tennis player

- Born: 15 July 1885; Vienna, Austria-Hungary
- Died: 15 October 1937 (aged 52)
Medal record
Representing Austrian Empire
Men's Tennis
Olympic Games
Silver medal – second place	1912 Stockholm	Doubles

Arthur Zborzil (15 July 1885 – 15 October 1937) was a male tennis player from Austria. At the 1912 Stockholm Olympics, he teamed up with Felix Pipes to win a silver medal in the men's doubles event.

Zborzil also competed at the 1908 Summer Olympics, but he lost his first match in the singles event as well as his first match with Felix Pipes in the doubles event.

== Olympic finals ==
=== Doubles (1 silver medal) ===
Result	Year	Location	Surface	Partner	Opponents	Score
Silver	1912	Summer Olympics, Stockholm	Clay	(Austrian Empire) Felix Pipes	(South Africa) Harold Kitson (South Africa) Charles Winslow	6–4, 1–6, 2–6, 2–6
