= Curt Benckert =

Swedish tennis player (1887–1950)

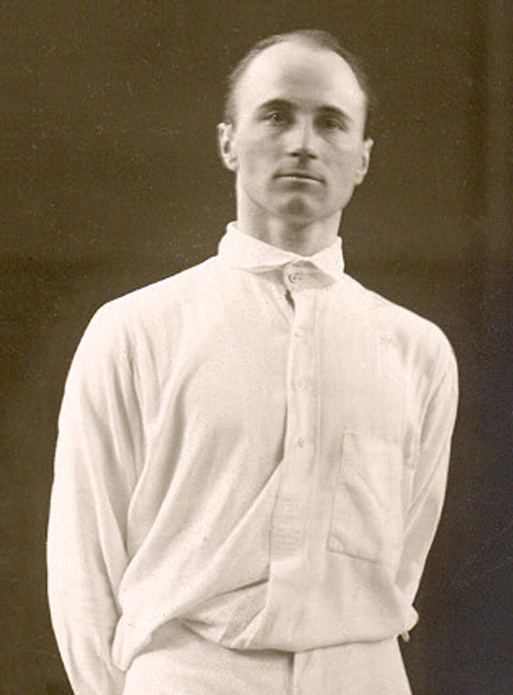
- Born: 8 August 1887; Sundsvall, Sweden
- Died: 28 November 1950 (aged 63); Österhaninge, Sweden

Curt Ragnar Benckert (8 August 1887 – 28 November 1950) was a Swedish tennis player. He competed in singles and doubles at the 1912 Summer Olympics and finished fifth in two doubles events.
