= Aleksandr Alenitsyn =

Russian tennis player

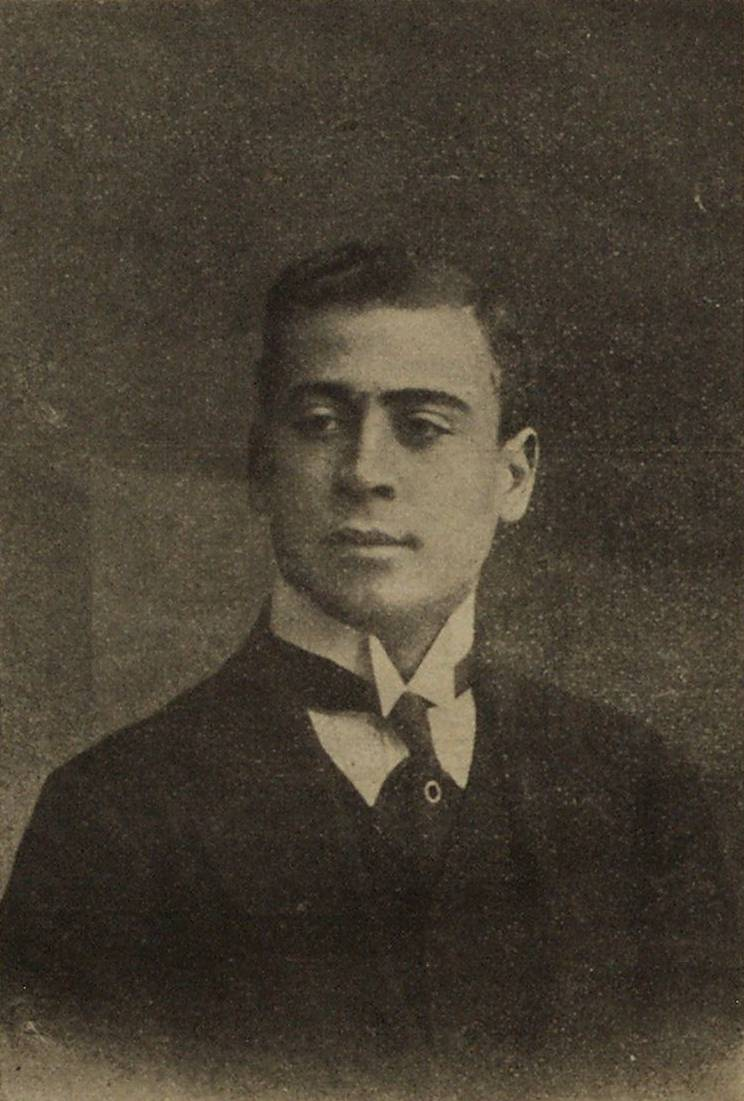
- Born: 29 November 1884 St. Petersburg, Russian Empire
- Died: 5 October 1922 (aged 37) Moscow, Soviet Union

Aleksandr Appolonovich Alenitsyn (Russian: Александр Аполлонович Аленицын, 29 November 1884 – 5 October 1922) was a Russian tennis player. He competed in the men's outdoor doubles event at the 1912 Summer Olympics. He committed suicide in prison in 1922 after being arrested and tortured by Soviet authorities for "having contacts with other countries".
