= Vagn Ingerslev =

Danish tennis player

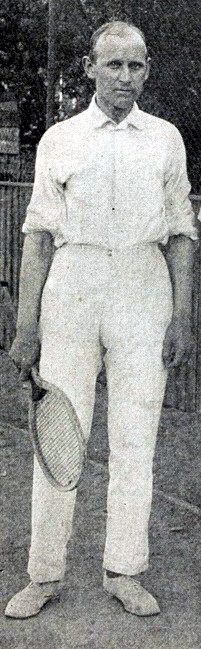
- Ingerslev in 1920
- Born: 23 March 1885; Vordingborg, Denmark
- Died: 28 December 1952 (aged 67); Copenhagen, Denmark

Singles
- WCCC: QF (1921)
- Olympic Games: 3R (1912) (outdoors)

Doubles
- Olympic Games: 1R (1912) (outdoors)

Vagn Ingerslev (23 March 1885 – 28 December 1952) was a Danish tennis player. He competed in two events at the 1912 Summer Olympics.
