= Jaromír Zeman =

Czech tennis player

- Born: 12 August 1886; Prague, Austria-Hungary

Jaromír Zeman (born 12 August 1886, date of death unknown) was a Czech tennis player. He competed for Bohemia in two events at the 1912 Summer Olympics.
