= Aage Madsen =

Danish tennis player

- Born: 25 May 1883; Faaborg, Denmark
- Died: 9 April 1937 (aged 53); Copenhagen, Denmark

Aage Madsen (25 May 1883 – 9 April 1937) was a Danish tennis player. He competed in two events at the 1912 Summer Olympics.

== Early life and education ==
Madsen was born on 25 May 1883 in Faaborg, the son of merchant Anders Sudergaard Madsen and Anne Catharina Dorothea Poulsen. He graduated from Borgerdyd School in Copenhagen in 1901. He completed his law studies (cand. jur.) at the University of Copenhagen in 1907.

== Career ==
Madsen was a paralegal in Esbjerg. He briefly worked for the By- og Herredsret in Sæby and Frederiksberg Birk in 1909–10 before his employment as an assistant in the Ministry of Financial Aggairs later in 1910. He worked as a copyist at the Landsoverret and Hof- og Stadsret-ten from 1015 and as a police accessor in Copenhagen from 1919. On 25 July 1919, he was licensed as a high court attorney (Overretssagfører). He was employed as a Police Attorney in 1028. He resigned in 1934 due to illness.

== Personal life ==
Madsen married dentist Mary Agnes Herskind on 23 December 1914. He died on 9 April 1937 in Copenhagen.
