= Hakon Leffler =

Swedish tennis player and businessman (1887–1972)

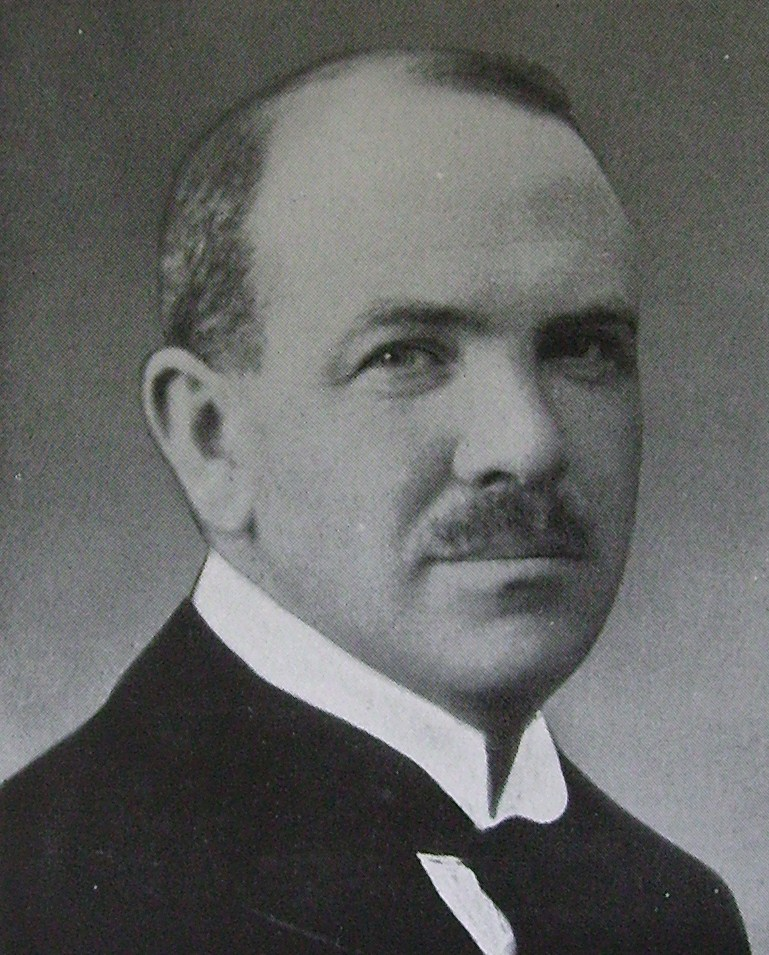
- Hakon Leffler in 1937
- Born: 11 March 1887; Gothenburg, Sweden
- Died: 31 July 1972 (aged 85); Gothenburg, Sweden

Hakon Leffler (11 March 1887 – 31 July 1972) was a Swedish engineer, businessman and tennis player.

He was the son of merchant Carl Leopold Leffler, studied electrical engineering at the Royal Institute of Technology from 1905 to 1908, and at Uppsala University where he graduated in 1910. After having worked at the M.E. Delbanco company 1912–1915, he became the CEO of Svensk oljeslageri AB 1916. In 1929, he became the deputy CEO at Gamlestadens fabriker, a textile company in Gothenburg, and in 1935, its CEO.

== Olympic career ==
Leffler competed in two individual tennis events at the 1912 Summer Olympics.
