= François Blanchy =

French tennis player

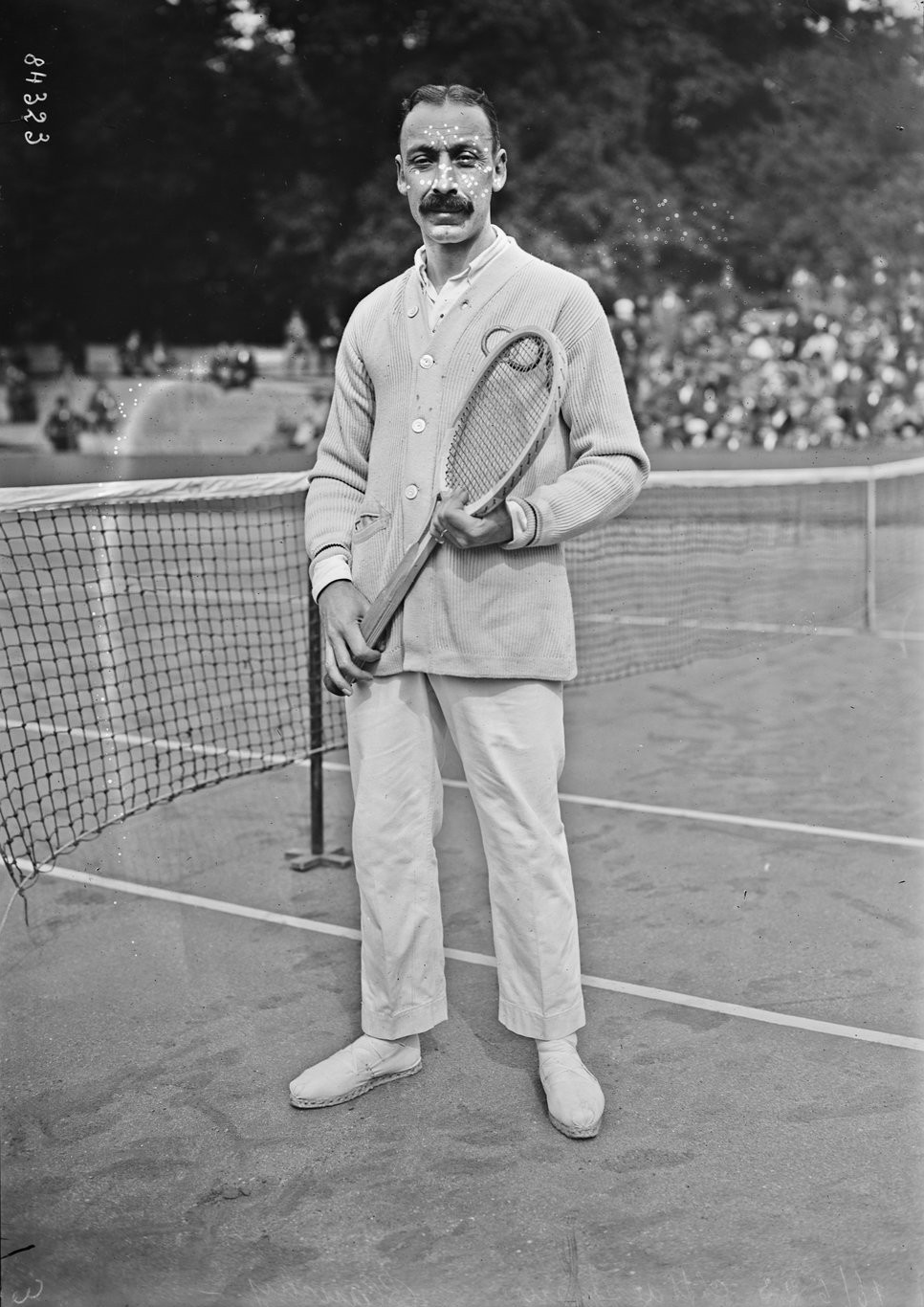
- Full name: François Joseph Marie Antoine Blanchy
- Country (sports): France
- Born: 12 December 1886; Bordeaux, France
- Died: 2 October 1960 (aged 73); Saint-Jean-de-Luz, France

François Joseph Marie Antoine Blanchy (French pronunciation: [fʁɑ̃swa blɑ̃ʃi]; 12 December 1886 – 2 October 1960) was a tennis player competing for France. He competed at the 1912 Summer Olympics and the 1920 Summer Olympics.

== Career ==
Runner-up to Maurice Germot in the singles final of the Amateur French Championships in 1910, Blanchy eventually won the title in 1923 over eight-time champion Max Decugis. He also won the doubles title at the tournament in 1923, partnering Jean Samazeuilh. Blanchy later became a sports official, directing the Villa Primrose (Bordeaux tennis club), and the French Tennis Federation.
