= Ove Frederiksen =

Danish tennis player

- Born: 22 August 1884; Køge, Denmark
- Died: 24 May 1966 (aged 81); Hellerup, Denmark

Ove Frederiksen (22 August 1884 – 24 May 1966) was a Danish tennis player. He competed in two events at the 1912 Summer Olympics.
