= Victor Georg Hansen =

Danish entomologist and tennis player

- Born: 29 August 1889; Copenhagen, Denmark
- Died: 6 March 1974 (aged 84); Copenhagen, Denmark

Victor Georg Hansen (29 August 1889 – 6 March 1974) was a Danish jurist, entomologist and tennis player. As an entomologist, he specialized in the beetles and is best known for his contributions to the beetle volumes of the Danmarks Fauna series. He competed in two events at the 1912 Summer Olympics.

Hansen studied law after going to the Metropolitanskolen and graduating in 1913. He joined the law ministry in 1915. He became a senior judge in 1941 and retired in 1959. Collecting beetles from the age of 22, he pursued entomology in his spare time throughout his life. His first publication was on the Danish Scydmaenidae (1911), and over his lifetime, he published numerous papers and 23 volumes on beetles in the series Danmarks Fauna. The Zoological Museum, Copenhagen, now holds his collections.

He was given an honorary doctorate by Copenhagen University in 1950.
