= Jean-Pierre Samazeuilh =

French tennis player

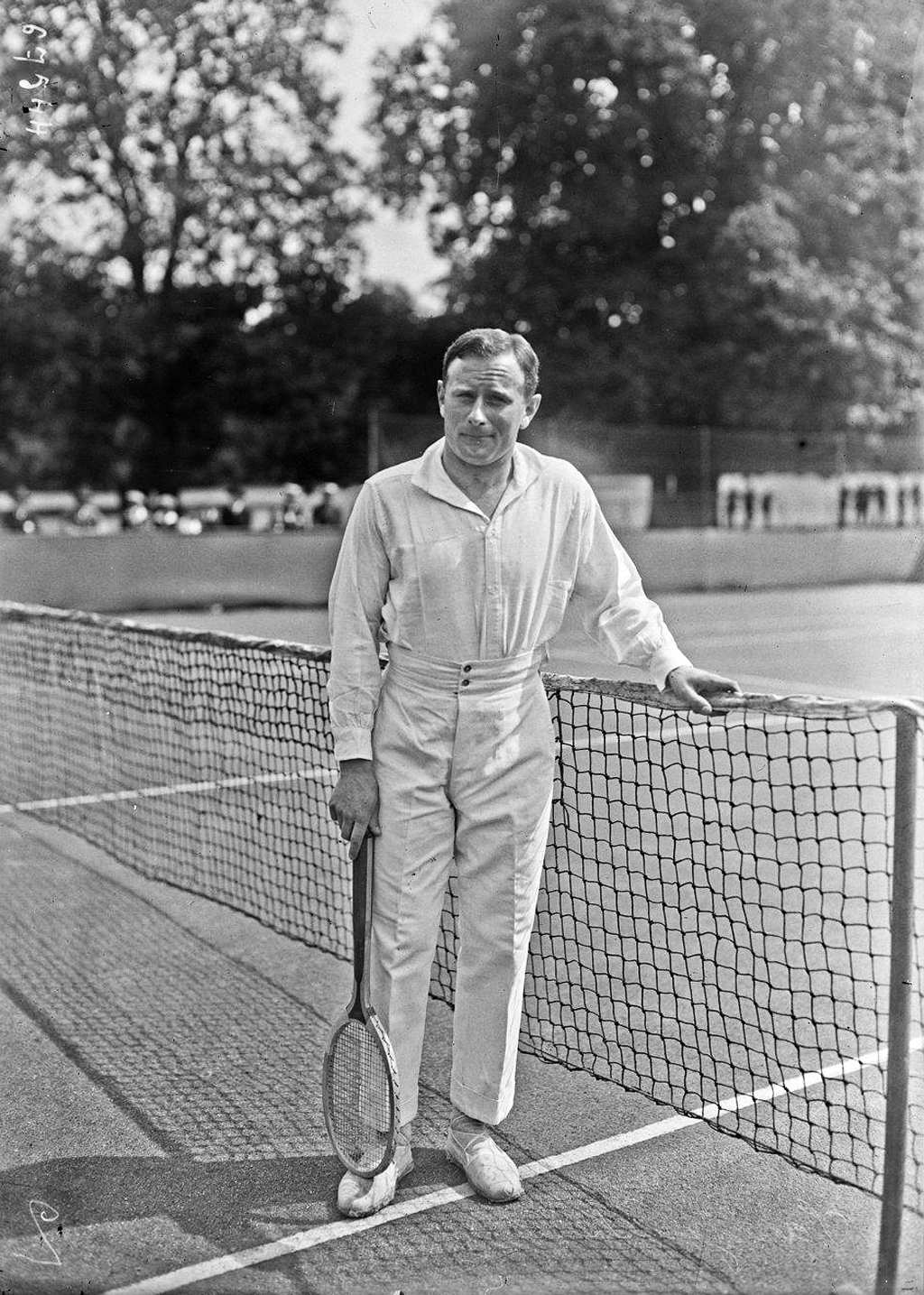
- Jean Samazeuilh at the 1921 Davis Cup match against British India in Paris
- Country (sports): France
- Born: 17 January 1891 Bordeaux, France
- Died: 13 April 1965 (aged 74) Mérignac, France
- Plays: Right-handed

Singles

Grand Slam singles results
- French Open Junior: Winner (1921)

Doubles

Grand Slam doubles results
- French Open Junior: Winner (1923)

Jean-Pierre Samazeuilh, best known as Jean Samazeuilh (17 January 1891, Bordeaux – 13 April 1965, Mérignac), was a right-handed tennis player competing for France.

Samazeuilh reached three singles finals at the Amateur French Championships, winning in 1921 over André Gobert. Samazeuilh also won the doubles title at the tournament in 1923, partnering François Blanchy. He also competed at the 1920 Summer Olympics.
