= Axel Thayssen =

Danish tennis player

- Born: 22 February 1885; Sorø, Denmark
- Died: 31 January 1952 (aged 66); Gentofte, Denmark

Axel Thayssen (22 February 1885 – 31 January 1952) was a Danish tennis player. He competed in two events at the 1912 Summer Olympics.
