= Harold Kitson =

South African tennis player

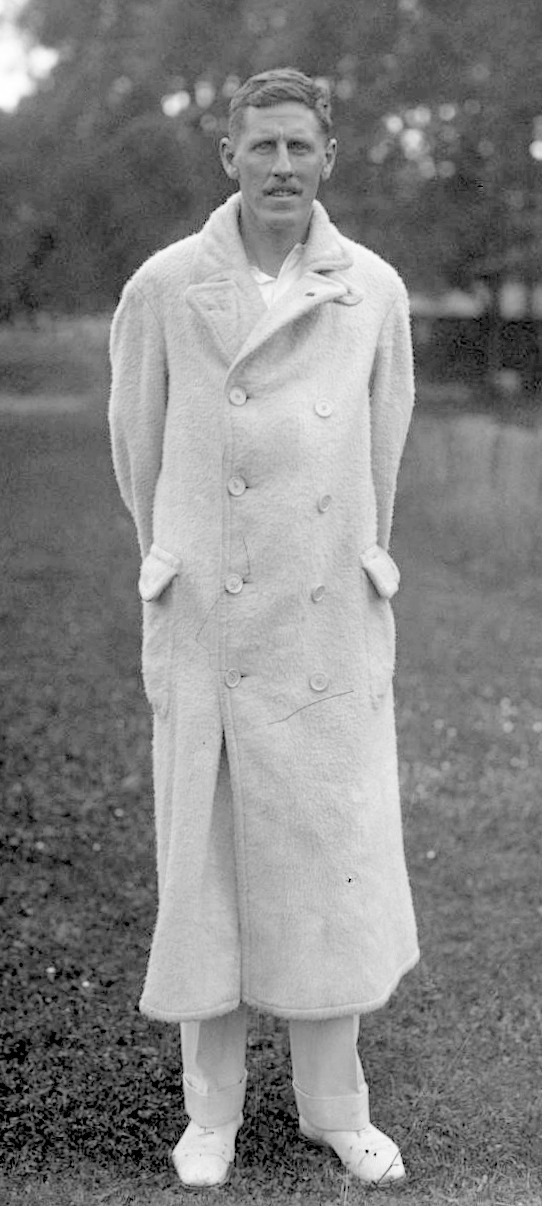
- Kitson in 1912
- Full name: Harold Austin Kitson
- Country (sports): South Africa
- Born: 17 June 1874 Richmond, Colony of Natal
- Died: 30 November 1951 (aged 77) Umkomaas, South Africa
- Turned pro: 1903 (amateur tour)
- Retired: 1914
- Plays: Right-handed (one-handed backhand)

Singles
- Career record: 0–2

Grand Slam singles results
- Wimbledon: 2R (1905, 1908)

Other tournaments
- WHCC: 2R (1912)

Doubles
- Career record: 0–0

Grand Slam doubles results
- Wimbledon: QF (1905)
Medal record
Representing South Africa
Olympic Games – Tennis
Gold medal – first place	1912 Stockholm	Doubles
Silver medal – second place	1912 Stockholm	Singles

Harry Austin Kitson (17 June 1874 – 30 November 1951) was a male tennis player from South Africa who won a gold medal at the men's doubles event at the 1912 Summer Olympics.

== Tennis career ==
Kitson competed in the singles and doubles events at the 1908 Summer Olympics in London. In the singles event, he had a bye in the first round and lost in straight sets to George Caridia in the second round. In the doubles, he was partnered by Victor Gauntlett and reached the quarterfinals, where Clement Cazalet and Charles P. Dixon proved too strong. Kitson was more successful at the 1912 Summer Olympics in Stockholm winning two medals. He won the gold medal in the men's doubles event together with Charles Lindhurst Winslow, defeating the Austrian team Arthur Zborzil / Fritz Pipes in the final. He won a silver medal in the men's singles tournament after losing in the final to his doubles partner in four sets.

Kitson won the South African Championships in 1905, 1908, 1911 and 1913 and was runner–up in 1909 and 1910 respectively to Reginald Doherty and Anthony Wilding.

== World Championships finals ==
=== Doubles (1 runner-up) ===
Result	Year	Championship	Surface	Partner	Opponents	Score
Loss	1912	World Hard Court Championships	Clay	(South Africa) Charles Winslow	(Germany) Otto Froitzheim (Germany) Oscar Kreuzer	6–4, 2–6, 1–6, 3–6

== Olympic finals ==
=== Singles (1 silver medal) ===
Result	Year	Location	Surface	Opponent	Score
Silver	1912	Summer Olympics, Stockholm	Clay	(South Africa) Charles Winslow	5–7, 6–4, 8–10, 6–8

=== Doubles (1 gold medal) ===
Result	Year	Location	Surface	Partner	Opponents	Score
Gold	1912	Summer Olympics, Stockholm	Clay	(South Africa) Charles Winslow	(Austrian Empire) Felix Pipes (Austrian Empire) Arthur Zborzil	4–6, 6–1, 6–2, 6–2
