= Jaroslav Just =

Czech tennis player

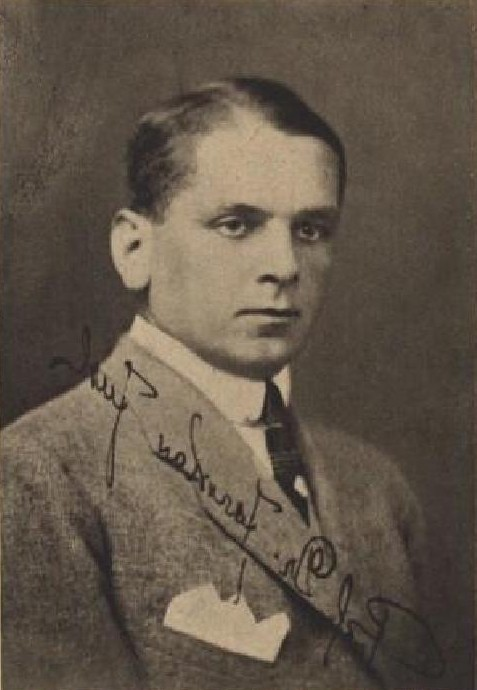
- Born: 6 February 1883; Prague, Austria-Hungary
- Died: 5 August 1928 (aged 45); Prague, Czechoslovakia

Jaroslav Just (Czech pronunciation: [ˈjaroslaf ˈjust]; 6 February 1883 – 5 August 1928) was a Czech tennis player. He competed for Bohemia at the 1912 Summer Olympics and for Czechoslovakia at the 1920 Summer Olympics. He was the president of the Czechoslovak Tennis Association between 1919 and 1928.
