= Albert Canet =

French tennis player (1878–1930)

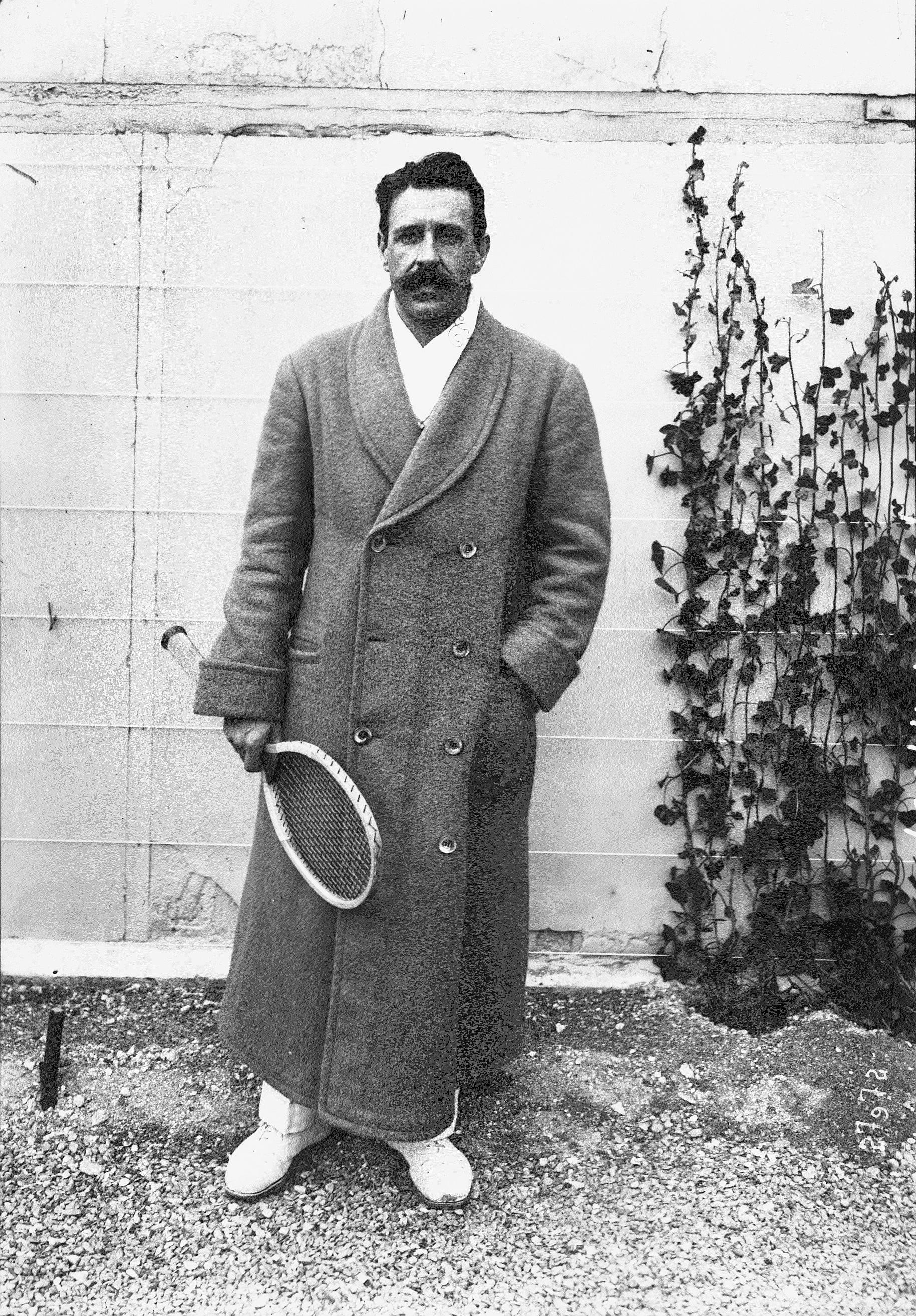
- Canet in 1913
- Full name: Henry Albert Canet
- Born: 17 April 1878 London, England
- Died: 25 July 1930 (aged 52) Paris, France
Medal record
Representing France
Men's Tennis
Olympic Games
Bronze medal – third place	1912 Stockholm	Doubles
Bronze medal – third place	1912 Stockholm	Mixed doubles

Henry Albert Canet (French: [albɛʁ kanɛ]; 17 April 1878 – 25 July 1930) was a male tennis player from France. He competed in the 1912 Summer Olympics in Stockholm, Sweden where he won two bronze medals. In the singles division, he succeeded in beating Norwegian Conrad Langaard, although lost to American opponent Roosevelt Pell.
