= Sweden at the 1912 Summer Olympics =

- IOC code: SWE

in Stockholm
- Competitors: 444 (421 men and 23 women) in 16 sports
- Flag bearer: Robert Olsson
- Medals Ranked 2nd: Gold 23 Silver 25 Bronze 17 Total 65

Summer Olympics appearances (overview)
- 1896; 1900; 1904; 1908; 1912; 1920; 1924; 1928; 1932; 1936; 1948; 1952; 1956; 1960; 1964; 1968; 1972; 1976; 1980; 1984; 1988; 1992; 1996; 2000; 2004; 2008; 2012; 2016; 2020; 2024

Other related appearances
- 1906 Intercalated Games

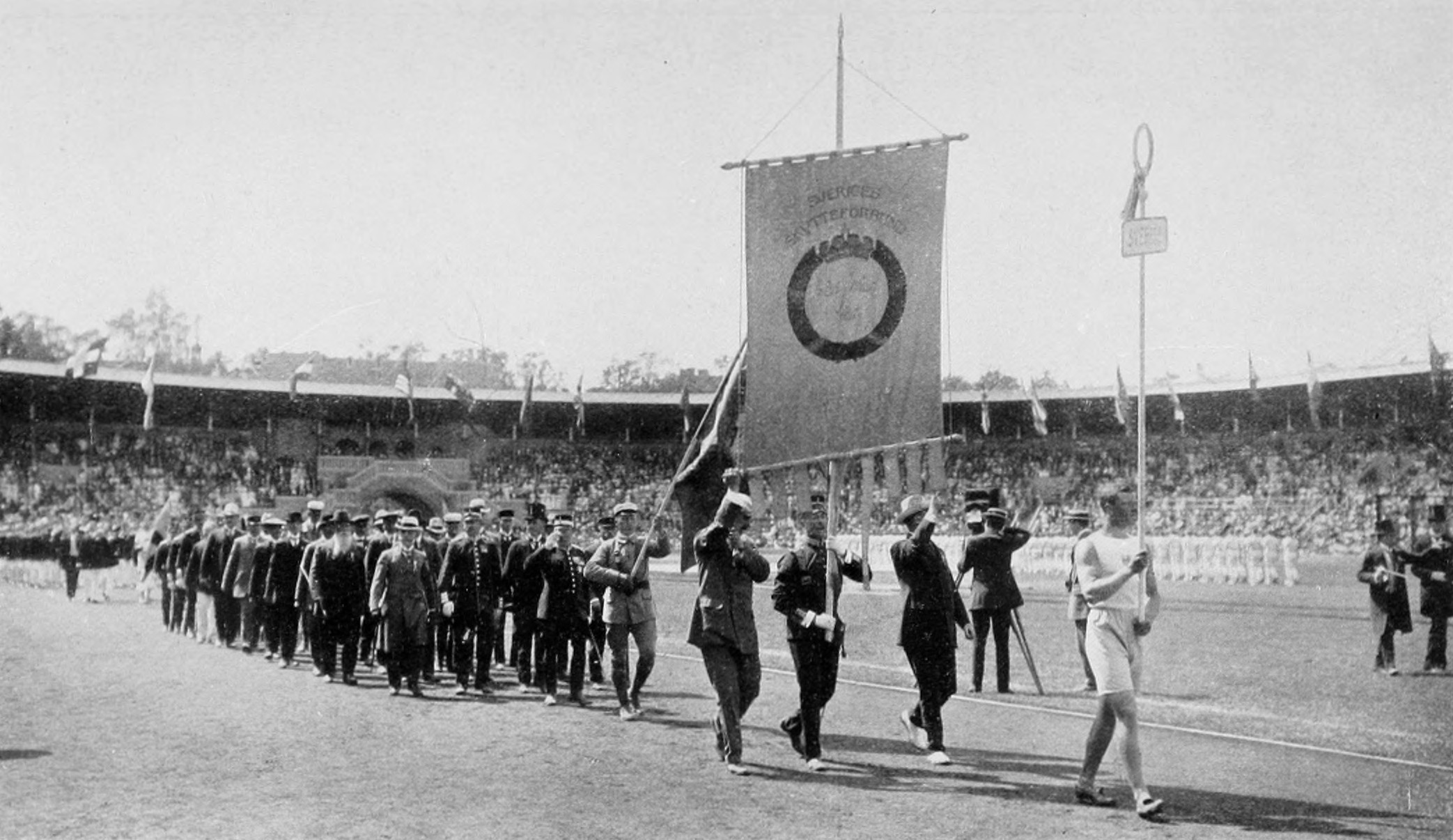
The team of Sweden at the opening ceremony.

Sweden was the host nation for the 1912 Summer Olympics in Stockholm. This was the nation's fourth appearance at the Olympics, after debuting in 1896. 444 competitors, 421 men and 23 women, took part in 95 events in 16 sports.

== Medalists ==
| Medal | Name | Sport | Event |
|---|---|---|---|
| Gold | Hjalmar Andersson; John Eke; Josef Ternström | Athletics | Men's team cross country |
| Gold | Eric Lemming | Athletics | Men's javelin |
| Gold | Gustaf Lindblom | Athletics | Men's triple jump |
| Gold | Erik Friborg; Ragnar Malm; Axel Persson; Algot Lönn | Cycling | Men's team time trial |
| Gold | Erik Adlerz | Diving | Men's 10m Platform |
| Gold | Greta Johansson | Diving | Women's 10 m Platform |
| Gold | Erik Adlerz | Diving | Men's plain high diving |
| Gold | Carl Bonde | Equestrian | Individual dressage |
| Gold | Axel Nordlander | Equestrian | Individual eventing |
| Gold | Axel Nordlander; Nils Adlercreutz; Ernst Casparsson; Henric Horn af Åminne | Equestrian | Team eventing |
| Gold | Gustaf Lewenhaupt; Gustaf Kilman; Hans von Rosen; Fredrik Rosencrantz | Equestrian | Team jumping |
| Gold | Men's team: Per Bertilsson; Carl-Ehrenfried Carlberg; Nils Granfelt; Curt Hartzell; Oswald Holmberg; Anders Hylander; Axel Janse; Boo Kullberg; Sven Landberg; Per Nilsson; Benkt Norelius; Axel Norling; Daniel Norling; Sven Rosén; Nils Silfverskiöld; Carl Silfverstrand; John Sörenson; Yngve Stiernspetz; Carl-Erik Svensson; Karl Johan Svensson; Knut Torell; Edward Wennerholm; Claës-Axel Wersäll; David Wiman | Gymnastics | Men's team (Swedish system) |
| Gold | Gösta Lilliehöök | Modern pentathlon | Men's individual |
| Gold | Carl Hellström; Erik Wallerius; Harald Wallin; Humbert Lundén; Herman Nyberg; Harry Rosenswärd; Paul Isberg; Filip Ericsson | Sailing | Men's 10 metre class |
| Gold | Åke Lundeberg | Shooting | Men's 100 m running deer, double shots |
| Gold | Alfred Swahn | Shooting | Men's 100 m running deer, single shot |
| Gold | Alfred Swahn; Oscar Swahn; Åke Lundeberg; Per-Olof Arvidsson | Shooting | Men's team 100 m running deer, single shot |
| Gold | Johan Hübner von Holst; Eric Carlberg; Vilhelm Carlberg; Gustaf Boivie | Shooting | Men's team 25 m small-bore rifle |
| Gold | Vilhelm Carlberg | Shooting | Men's 25 m small-bore rifle |
| Gold | Eric Carlberg; Vilhelm Carlberg; Johan Hübner von Holst; Paul Palén | Shooting | Men's team 30 m military pistol |
| Gold | Mauritz Eriksson; Hugo Johansson; Erik Blomqvist; Carl Björkman; Bernhard Larsson; Gustaf Jonsson | Shooting | Men's team free rifle |
| Gold | Arvid Andersson; Adolf Bergman; Johan Edman; Erik Algot Fredriksson; Carl Jonsson; Erik Larsson; August Gustafsson; Herbert Lindström | Tug of war | Men's team |
| Gold | Claes Johansson | Wrestling (Greco-Roman) | Men's middleweight |
| Silver | Thorild Ohlsson; Ernst Wide; Bror Fock; Nils Frykberg; John Zander | Athletics | Men's 3000 m team |
| Silver | Ivan Möller; Charles Luther; Ture Person; Knut Lindberg | Athletics | Men's 4 × 100 m relay |
| Silver | Hjalmar Andersson | Athletics | Men's individual cross country |
| Silver | Hugo Wieslander | Athletics | Men's decathlon |
| Silver | Charles Lomberg | Athletics | Men's decathlon |
| Silver | Georg Åberg | Athletics | Men's triple jump |
| Silver | Lisa Regnell | Diving | Women's 10 m platform |
| Silver | Hjalmar Johansson | Diving | Plain high diving |
| Silver | Gustaf Adolf Boltenstern | Equestrian | Individual dressage |
| Silver | Gösta Åsbrink | Modern pentathlon | Men's individual |
| Silver | Ture Rosvall; William Bruhn-Möller; Conrad Brunkman; Herman Dahlbäck; Leo Wilkens | Rowing | Men's coxed fours, inriggers |
| Silver | Nils Persson; Hugo Clason; Richard Sällström; Nils Lamby; Kurt Bergström; Dick Bergström; Erik Lindqvist; Per Bergman; Sigurd Kander; Folke Johnson | Sailing | Men's 12 metre class |
| Silver | Bengt Heyman; Emil Henriques; Herbert Westermark; Nils Westermark; Alvar Thiel | Sailing | Men's metre class |
| Silver | Edward Benedicks | Shooting | Men's 100 m running deer, double shots |
| Silver | Åke Lundeberg | Shooting | Men's 100 m running deer, single shot |
| Silver | Paul Palén | Shooting | Men's 25 m rapid fire pistol |
| Silver | Johan Hübner von Holst | Shooting | Men's 25 m small-bore rifle |
| Silver | Georg de Laval; Eric Carlberg; Vilhelm Carlberg; Erik Boström | Shooting | Men's team 50 m military pistol |
| Silver | Arthur Nordenswan; Eric Carlberg; Ruben Örtegren; Vilhelm Carlberg | Shooting | Men's team 50 m small-bore rifle |
| Silver | Thor Henning | Swimming | Men's 400 m breaststroke |
| Silver | Carl Kempe; Gunnar Setterwall | Tennis | Men's doubles indoor |
| Silver | Sigrid Fick; Gunnar Setterwall | Tennis | Mixed doubles outdoor |
| Silver | Torsten Kumfeldt; Harald Julin; Max Gumpel; Robert Andersson; Pontus Hanson; Vilhelm Andersson; Erik Bergqvist | Water polo | Men's team |
| Silver | Gustaf Malmström | Wrestling (Greco-Roman) | Men's lightweight |
| Silver | Anders Ahlgren | Wrestling (Greco-Roman) | Men's light heavyweight |
| Bronze | John Eke | Athletics | Men's individual cross country |
| Bronze | Gosta Holmer | Athletics | Men's decathlon |
| Bronze | Emil Magnusson | Athletics | Men's two handed discus throw |
| Bronze | Georg Åberg | Athletics | Men's long jump |
| Bronze | Bertil Uggla | Athletics | Men's pole vault |
| Bronze | Erik Almlöf | Athletics | Men's triple jump |
| Bronze | Gustaf Blomgren | Diving | Men's 10 m platform |
| Bronze | John Jansson | Diving | Men's plain high diving |
| Bronze | Hans von Blixen-Finecke | Equestrian | Individual dressage |
| Bronze | Georg de Laval | Modern pentathlon | Men's individual |
| Bronze | Eric Sandberg; Harald Sandberg; Otto Aust | Sailing | Men's 6 metre class |
| Bronze | Oscar Swahn | Shooting | Men's 100 m running deer, double shots |
| Bronze | Johan Hübner von Holst | Shooting | Men's 25 m rapid fire pistol |
| Bronze | Gideon Ericsson | Shooting | Men's 25 m small-bore rifle |
| Bronze | Mauritz Eriksson; Werner Jernström; Tönnes Björkman; Carl Björkman; Bernhard Larsson; Hugo Johansson | Shooting | Men's team military rifle |
| Bronze | Sigrid Fick; Gunnar Setterwall | Tennis | Mixed doubles indoor |
| Bronze | Edvin Mattiasson | Wrestling (Greco-Roman) | Men's lightweight |

== Athletics ==
106 or 107 athletes represented Sweden in the sport. Tage Brauer is listed in some sources as having competed and having cleared 1.60 metres in high jump, but other sources make clear he did not start.

Hugo Wieslander, who had originally won the silver medal in the decathlon, was awarded gold after Jim Thorpe was disqualified. When Thorpe was reinstated in 1982, Wieslander retained his gold medal in the event and became co-champions with Thorpe. In 2022, in consultation with surviving members of Wieslander's family, the IOC reinstated Thorpe as the sole winner of the event, as all his competitors had always wanted.

| Athlete | Events | Heat | | Semifinal | | Final | |
| Athlete | Events | Result | Rank | Result | Rank | Result | Rank |
|---|---|---|---|---|---|---|---|
| Arvid Åberg | Hammer | | | 41.11 | 10 | Did not advance | |
| Georg Åberg | Long jump | | | 7.04 | 3 | 7.18 | 3 |
| Georg Åberg | Triple jump | | | 14.51 | 2 | 14.51 | 2 |
| Richard Åbrink | Javelin | | | 52.20 | 6 | Did not advance | |
| Richard Åbrink | 2-hand javelin | | | 93.12 | 6 | Did not advance | |
| Alexis Ahlgren | Marathon | | | | | did not finish | |
| Erik Almlöf | Triple jump | | | 14.17 | 3 | 14.17 | 3 |
| Carl Andersson | Marathon | | | | | 3:06:13.0 | 24 |
| Hjalmar Andersson | Ind. x-country | | | | | 45:44.8 | 2 |
| Karl Bergh | Standing long jump | | | 2.95 | 18 | Did not advance | |
| Karl Bergh | Standing high jump | | | 1.45 | 7 | Did not advance | |
| Thure Bergvall | Marathon | | | | | did not finish | |
| Gustav Bétzen | Long jump | | | 6.24 | 21 | did not advance | |
| Evert Björn | 800 m | ? | ? | ? | ? | Did not advance | |
| Evert Björn | 1500 m | | | 4:07.2 | ? | ? | ? |
| Gunnar Bolander | Discus | | | 36.22 | 26 | Did not advance | |
| Tage Brauer | High jump | | | 1.60 | 28 | Did not advance | |
| Gustaf Carlén | Ind. x-country | | | | | 51:26.8 | 21 |
| Mauritz Carlsson | 5000 m | | | 15:34.6 | 10 | 15:18.6 | 7 |
| Mauritz Carlsson | 10000 m | | | 33:06.2 | 5 | did not finish | |
| Janne Dahl | Javelin | | | 45.67 | 15 | Did not advance | |
| Hjalmar Dahlberg | Marathon | | | | | 3:13:32.2 | 27 |
| John Dahlin | 400 m | 51.0 | ? | did not start | | Did not advance | |
| Ragnar Ekberg | 100 m | ? | ? | Did not advance | | | |
| Ragnar Ekberg | Standing long jump | | | 3.03 | 13 | Did not advance | |
| John Eke | 10000 m | | | 34:55.8 | 14 | did not start | |
| John Eke | Ind. x-country | | | | | 46:37.6 | 3 |
| Leif Ekman | Standing high jump | | | 1.45 | 7 | Did not advance | |
| Hugo Ericson | Pentathlon | | | | | Eliminated | 18 |
| Eskil Falk | Javelin | | | 0 | 24 | Did not advance | |
| Nils Fjästad | Pentathlon | | | | | Eliminated | 11 |
| Folke Fleetwood | Discus | | | 35.06 | 28 | Did not advance | |
| Folke Fleetwood | 2-hand discus | | | 68.22 | 7 | Did not advance | |
| Bror Fock | 10000 m | | | did not finish | | Did not advance | |
| Bror Fock | Ind. x-country | | | | | 50:15.8 | 17 |
| Erik Frisell | 800 m | 1:59.2 | ? | Did not advance | | | |
| Nils Frykberg | 1500 m | | | ? | ? | Did not advance | |
| Clas Gille | Pole vault | | | 3.60 | 12 | Did not advance | |
| Emil Grandell | 200 m | ? | ? | Did not advance | | | |
| William Grüner | Marathon | | | | | did not finish | |
| David Guttman | Marathon | | | | | did not finish | |
| Viktor Hackberg | Hammer | | | 38.44 | 13 | Did not advance | |
| Viktor Hackberg | Decathlon | | | | | 1694.600 | 27 |
| Sten Hagander | 2-hand javelin | | | 86.80 | 11 | Did not advance | |
| Karl Haglund | 800 m | 2:01.2 | ? | Did not advance | | | |
| Gösta Hallberg | High jump | | | 1.75 | 13 | Did not advance | |
| Carl Hårleman | Pole vault | | | 3.60 | 12 | Did not advance | |
| Edvin Hellgren | Ind. x-country | | | | | did not finish | |
| Gustaf Holmér | High jump | | | 1.60 | 28 | Did not advance | |
| Gustaf Holmér | Pentathlon | | | | | Eliminated | 8 |
| Gustaf Holmér | Decathlon | | | | | 7347.855 | 3 |
| Sigfrid Jacobsson | Marathon | | | | | 2:43:24.9 | 6 |
| Skotte Jacobsson | 100 m | ? | ? | Did not advance | | | |
| Skotte Jacobsson | 200 m | ? | ? | ? | ? | Did not advance | |
| Skotte Jacobsson | Triple jump | | | 13.33 | 17 | Did not advance | |
| Skotte Jacobsson | Decathlon | | | | | 2667.500 | 21 |
| Carl Jahnzon | Hammer | | | 42.58 | 8 | Did not advance | |
| Gunnar Johnson | Hammer | | | 39.92 | 11 | Did not advance | |
| John Klintberg | Ind. x-country | | | | | did not finish | |
| Anders Krigsman | Javelin | | | 46.71 | 14 | Did not advance | |
| Anders Krigsman | 2-hand javelin | | | 85.80 | 13 | Did not advance | |
| Erik Kugelberg | Pentathlon | | | | | Eliminated | 15 |
| Erik Kugelberg | Decathlon | | | | | 6758.780 | 8 |
| Karl-Axel Kullerstrand | High jump | | | 1.83 | 1 | 1.83 | 8 |
| Algot Larsson | Javelin | | | 43.18 | 21 | Did not advance | |
| Brynolf Larsson | 10000 m | | | did not finish | | Did not advance | |
| Brynolf Larsson | Ind. x-country | | | | | 47:37.4 | 9 |
| Eric Lemming | Javelin | | | 57.42 OR | 1 | 60.64 OR | 1 |
| Eric Lemming | 2-hand discus | | | 67.08 | 11 | Did not advance | |
| Eric Lemming | 2-hand javelin | | | 98.59 | 4 | Did not advance | |
| Oscar Lemming | Pentathlon | | | | | Eliminated | 10 |
| Carl Johan Lind | Discus | | | 36.07 | 27 | Did not advance | |
| Carl Johan Lind | Hammer | | | 45.61 | 5 | Did not advance | |
| Carl Johan Lind | 2-hand discus | | | 68.02 | 8 | Did not advance | |
| Alexander Lindahl | Ind. x-country | | | | | did not finish | |
| Knut Lindberg | 100 m | 11.6 | ? | ? | ? | Did not advance | |
| Knut Lindberg | 200 m | 23.1 | ? | 22.5 | ? | Did not advance | |
| Gustaf Lindblom | Triple jump | | | 14.76 | 1 | 14.76 | 1 |
| Karl Lindblom | 200 m | ? | ? | Did not advance | | | |
| Nils Linde | Hammer | | | 43.32 | 7 | Did not advance | |
| Nils Linde | 2-hand discus | | | 67.10 | 9 | Did not advance | |
| Eric Lindholm | 400 m | 51.4 | ? | 50.2 | ? | Did not advance | |
| Eric Lindholm | 800 m | 2:01.5 | ? | Did not advance | | | |
| Inge Lindholm | Triple jump | | | 13.74 | 12 | Did not advance | |
| Inge Lindholm | Pentathlon | | | | | Eliminated | 8 |
| Gustaf Ljunggren | Standing long jump | | | 3.09 | 11 | Did not advance | |
| Charles Lomberg | Long jump | | | 6.62 | 17 | Did not advance | |
| Charles Lomberg | Pentathlon | | | | | Eliminated | 15 |
| Charles Lomberg | Decathlon | | | | | 7413.510 | 2 |
| Ivan Lönnberg | Marathon | | | | | did not finish | |
| Ivar Lundberg | Marathon | | | | | 3:16:35.2 | 28 |
| Klas Lundström | 5000 m | | | did not finish | | Did not advance | |
| Klas Lundström | Ind. x-country | | | | | 48:45.4 | 13 |
| Charles Luther | 100 m | 12.4 | ? | ? | ? | Did not advance | |
| Charles Luther | 200 m | 23.6 | ? | 22.3 | ? | Did not advance | |
| Emil Magnusson | Discus | | | 39.91 | 8 | Did not advance | |
| Emil Magnusson | 2-hand discus | | | 75.35 | 2 | 77.37 | 3 |
| Gustaf Malmsten | Standing long jump | | | 3.20 | 4 | Did not advance | |
| Ragnar Mattson | High jump | | | 1.70 | 23 | Did not advance | |
| Douglas Melin | Standing long jump | | | 3.02 | 14 | Did not advance | |
| Bror Modigh | 5000 m | | | 16:07.1 | ? | Did not advance | |
| Edvard Möller | Standing long jump | | | 3.14 | 5 | Did not advance | |
| Edvard Möller | Standing high jump | | | 1.50 | 1 | 1.50 | 4 |
| Gustav Möller | 200 m | ? | ? | Did not advance | | | |
| Gustav Möller | 400 m | ? | ? | Did not advance | | | |
| Henning Möller | Discus | | | 32.23 | 37 | Did not advance | |
| Ivan Möller | 100 m | 11.5 | ? | ? | ? | Did not advance | |
| Ivan Möller | 200 m | 23.6 | ? | 22.4 | ? | Did not advance | |
| Carl Nilsson | Marathon | | | | | 3:26:56.4 | 32 |
| Einar Nilsson | Shot put | | | 12.62 | 7 | Did not advance | |
| Einar Nilsson | Discus | | | 39.69 | 10 | Did not advance | |
| Einar Nilsson | 2-hand shot put | | | 23.37 | 5 | Did not advance | |
| Einar Nilsson | 2-hand discus | | | 71.40 | 4 | Did not advance | |
| Einar Nilsson | Pentathlon | | | | | Eliminated | 14 |
| Einar Nilsson | Decathlon | | | | | 2925.200 | 19 |
| Gunnar Nilsson | Discus | | | 37.44 | 23 | Did not advance | |
| Gunnar Nilsson | 2-hand discus | | | 67.09 | 10 | Did not advance | |
| Magnus Nilsson | Pole vault | | | 3.20 | 18 | Did not advance | |
| Otto Nilsson | Discus | | | 31.07 | 40 | Did not advance | |
| Otto Nilsson | Javelin | | | 49.18 | 10 | Did not advance | |
| Otto Nilsson | 2-hand javelin | | | 88.90 | 8 | Did not advance | |
| Gustaf Nordén | Triple jump | | | 13.81 | 10 | Did not advance | |
| Henrik Nordström | 5000 m | | | 15:49.1 | 12 | did not start | |
| Henrik Nordström | Ind. x-country | | | | | did not finish | |
| Albert Öberg | 10000 m | | | 35:45.0 | 16 | Did not advance | |
| Hjalmar Ohlsson | Triple jump | | | 14.01 | 7 | Did not advance | |
| Patrik Ohlsson | Long jump | | | 6.28 | 20 | did not advance | |
| Patrik Ohlsson | Triple jump | | | 13.45 | 15 | Did not advance | |
| Thorild Ohlsson | 5000 m | | | 15:25.2 | 5 | did not start | |
| Arvid Ohrling | Javelin | | | 45.32 | 16 | Did not advance | |
| Arvid Ohrling | 2-hand javelin | | | 87.17 | 10 | Did not advance | |
| Robert Olsson | Hammer | | | 46.50 | 4 | Did not advance | |
| Svante Olsson | Javelin | | | 46.94 | 13 | Did not advance | |
| Ture Person | 100 m | ? | ? | Did not advance | | | |
| Ture Person | 200 m | 23.2 | ? | ? | ? | Did not advance | |
| Martin Persson | 5000 m | | | did not finish | | Did not advance | |
| Martin Persson | 10000 m | | | 34:18.6 | 11 | did not start | |
| Gunnar Rönström | Decathlon | | | | | 2446.950 | 22 |
| Sander Santesson | Pole vault | | | 3.20 | 18 | Did not advance | |
| Richard Sjöberg | High jump | | | 1.75 | 13 | Did not advance | |
| Richard Sjöberg | Pole vault | | | 3.60 | 12 | Did not advance | |
| Rudolf Smedmark | 100 m | ? | ? | did not finish | | Did not advance | |
| Rudolf Smedmark | Standing high jump | | | 1.45 | 7 | Did not advance | |
| Karl Sonne | Javelin | | | 47.85 | 11 | Did not advance | |
| Karl Sonne | 2-hand javelin | | | 84.96 | 14 | Did not advance | |
| Knut Stenborg | 200 m | ? | ? | Did not advance | | | |
| Knut Stenborg | 400 m | 1:01.6 | ? | 50.5 | ? | Did not advance | |
| Johan Sundkvist | Ind. x-country | | | | | 47:40.0 | 10 |
| Hugo Svensson | Pole vault | | | 3.20 | 18 | Did not advance | |
| Josef Ternström | Ind. x-country | | | | | 47:07.1 | 5 |
| Gustaf Törnros | Marathon | | | | | did not finish | |
| Bertil Uggla | Pole vault | | | 3.65 | 1 | 3.80 | 3 |
| Paulus af Uhr | High jump | | | 1.70 | 23 | Did not advance | |
| Hugo Wieslander | Pentathlon | | | | | 32 points | 7 |
| Hugo Wieslander | Decathlon | | | | | 7724.495 | 2 |
| Jacob Westberg | Marathon | | | | | 3:02:05.2 | 22 |
| Ernst Wide | 1500 m | | | 4:06.0 | ? | 3:57.6 | 5 |
| John Zander | 1500 m | | | 4:05.5 | 3 | 4:02.0 | 7 |
| Paul Zerling | 400 m | 55.4 | ? | ? | ? | Did not advance | |
| Hjalmar Andersson; John Eke; Josef Ternström | Team x-country | | | | | 10 points | 1 |
| John Dahlin; Eric Lindholm; Knut Stenborg; Paul Zerling | 4 × 400 m relay | | | 3:25.0 | 5 | Did not advance | |
| Bror Fock; Nils Frykberg; Thorild Olsson; Ernst Wide; John Zander | 3000 m team | | | 9 points | N/A | 13 points | 2 |
| Knut Lindberg; Charles Luther; Ivan Möller; Ture Person | 4 × 100 m relay | 43.6 OR | 1 | 42.5 OR | 2 | 42.6 | 2 |

Aside from the 107 athletes listed above Hugo Ahrén, Janne Andersson, Lennart Andrén, Tage Brauer, Carl Frick, Folke Hellstedt, Georg Holmqvist, John Johansson, Erik Larsson, Seth Levin, Josef Lindblom, Filip Löwendahl, Helmer Måhl, Anton Nilsson, Torwald Norling, David Nygren, Carl Silfverstrand, Erik Simonsson, Erik Svensson, Knut Thelning and Tor Österlund were also registered to participate in one or several athletic events, but did not do so.

== Cycling ==
=== Road cycling ===
| Cyclist | Events | Final | |
| Cyclist | Events | Result | Rank |
|---|---|---|---|
| Ernst Björk | Ind. time trial | 12:00:49.4 | 51 |
| Alexis Ekström | Ind. time trial | 11:14:50.7 | 12 |
| Erik Friborg | Ind. time trial | 11:04:17.0 | 7 |
| Werner Karlsson | Ind. time trial | 11:24:18.0 | 19 |
| Karl Landsberg | Ind. time trial | did not finish | |
| Hjalmar Levin | Ind. time trial | did not finish | |
| Algot Lönn | Ind. time trial | 11:12:02.5 | 10 |
| Carl Lundquist | Ind. time trial | did not finish | |
| Ragnar Malm | Ind. time trial | 11:08:14.5 | 8 |
| Henrik Morén | Ind. time trial | 11:21:31.9 | 15 |
| Axel Persson | Ind. time trial | 11:10:59.6 | 9 |
| Arvid Pettersson | Ind. time trial | did not finish | |
| Erik Friborg; Ragnar Malm; Axel Persson; Algot Lönn | Team time trial | 44:35:33.6 | 1 |

== Diving ==
| Diver | Events | Heat | | Final | |
| Diver | Events | Result | Rank | Result | Rank |
|---|---|---|---|---|---|
| Erik Adlerz | 10 m platform | 74.76 | 1 | 73.94 | 1 |
| Erik Adlerz | Plain high dive | 39.90 | 2 | 40.00 | 1 |
| Märta Adlerz | 10 m platform | 21.90 | 13 | Did not advance | |
| Elsa Andersson | 10 m platform | 29.70 | 8 | 31.30 | 6 |
| Robert Andersson | 10 m platform | 60.39 | 13 | Did not advance | |
| Selma Andersson | 10 m platform | 30.60 | 7 | 28.30 | 7 |
| Ernfrid Appelqvist | 3 m springboard | 62.61 | 11 | Did not advance | |
| Harald Arbin | 10 m platform | 62.75 | 7 | 62.62 | 6 |
| Gustaf Blomgren | 10 m platform | 68.50 | 2 | 69.56 | 3 |
| Ernst Brandsten | 3 m springboard | 65.02 | 10 | Did not advance | |
| Ernst Brandsten | 10 m platform | 61.42 | 11 | Did not advance | |
| Ernst Brandsten | Plain high dive | 37.70 | 6 | 36.20 | 7 |
| Eskil Brodd | 3 m springboard | 62.60 | 12 | Did not advance | |
| Alvin Carlsson | 10 m platform | 66.98 | 4 | 63.16 | 7 |
| Viktor Crondahl | Plain high dive | 37.00 | 7 | 37.10 | 4 |
| Ester Edström | 10 m platform | 26.30 | 11 | Did not advance | |
| Ella Eklund | 10 m platform | 34.40 | 3 | 31.90 | 5 |
| Ernst Eklund | 3 m springboard | 53.02 | 17 | Did not advance | |
| Ernst Eklund | 10 m platform | 59.94 | 14 | Did not advance | |
| Gunnar Ekstrand | Plain high dive | 35.30 | 13 | Did not advance | |
| Torsten Eriksson | 10 m platform | did not start | | Did not advance | |
| Torsten Eriksson | Plain high dive | 35.80 | 10 | Did not advance | |
| Elis Holmer | Plain high dive | 30.20 | 26 | Did not advance | |
| John Jansson | 3 m springboard | 77.77 | 3 | 69.64 | 7 |
| John Jansson | 10 m platform | 59.75 | 15 | Did not advance | |
| John Jansson | Plain high dive | 38.30 | 4 | 39.10 | 3 |
| Alfred Johansson | Plain high dive | 34.70 | 17 | Did not advance | |
| Gerda Johansson | 10 m platform | 28.70 | 9 | Did not advance | |
| Greta Johansson | 10 m platform | 36.20 | 1 | 39.90 | 1 |
| Hjalmar Johansson | 10 m platform | 68.06 | 3 | 67.80 | 4 |
| Hjalmar Johansson | Plain high dive | 40.10 | 1 | 39.30 | 2 |
| Tora Larsson | 10 m platform | 31.00 | 6 | 26.80 | 8 |
| Sven Montan | Plain high dive | 30.20 | 26 | Did not advance | |
| Dagmar Nilsson | 10 m platform | 27.30 | 10 | Did not advance | |
| Sven Nylund | 3 m springboard | 62.60 | 12 | Did not advance | |
| Elsa Regnell | 10 m platform | 34.90 | 2 | 33.20 | 4 |
| Lisa Regnell | 10 m platform | 34.10 | 4 | 36.00 | 2 |
| Axel Runström | 3 m springboard | 58.42 | 15 | Did not advance | |
| Axel Runström | Plain high dive | 38.30 | 4 | 36.00 | 6 |
| Gösta Sjöberg | 10 m platform | 62.08 | 10 | Did not advance | |
| Jens Stefenson | 10 m platform | 41.54 | 21 | Did not advance | |
| Jens Stefenson | Plain high dive | 31.20 | 25 | Did not advance | |
| Willy Thulin | 10 m platform | 25.00 | 12 | Did not advance | |
| Erik Tjäder | 3 m springboard | 53.56 | 16 | Did not advance | |

== Equestrian ==
| Rider | Horse | Events | Final | |
| Rider | Horse | Events | Result | Rank |
|---|---|---|---|---|
| Nils Adlercreutz | Ilex | Ind. jumping | 181 | 6 |
| Nils Adlercreutz | Atout | Ind. eventing | 46.31 | 4 |
| Hans von Blixen-Finecke | Maggie | Ind. dressage | 32 | 3 |
| Gustaf Adolf Boltenstern | Neptun | Ind. dressage | 21 | 2 |
| Carl Bonde | Emperor | Ind. dressage | 15 | 1 |
| Ernst Casparsson | Kiriki | Ind. jumping | 181 | 6 |
| Ernst Casparsson | Ermelin | Ind. eventing | 46.16 | 5 |
| Åke Hök | Mona | Ind. jumping | 170 | 22 |
| Henric Horn af Åminne | Omen | Ind. eventing | 45.85 | 10 |
| Carl Kruckenberg | Kartusch | Ind. dressage | 51 | 8 |
| Charles Lewenhaupt | Arno | Ind. jumping | 180 | 9 |
| Gustaf Lewenhaupt | Medusa | Ind. jumping | 180 | 9 |
| Axel Nordlander | Lady Artist | Ind. eventing | 46.59 | 1 |
| Carl Rosenblad | Miss Hastings | Ind. dressage | 43 | 5 |
| Oscar af Ström | Irish Lass | Ind. dressage | 47 | 6 |
| Carl-Axel Torén | Falken | Ind. jumping | 179 | 13 |
| Gustaf Kilman; Gustaf Lewenhaupt; Hans von Rosen; Fredrik Rosencrantz | Gåtan; Medusa; Lord Iron; Drabant | Team jumping | 545 | 1 |
| Nils Adlercreutz; Ernst Casparsson; Henric Horn af Åminne; Axel Nordlander | Atout; Irmelin; Omen; Lady Artist | Ind. eventing | 139.06 | 1 |

== Fencing ==
| Fencer | Events | Round 1 | | Quarterfinals | | Semifinals | | Final | |
| Fencer | Events | Result | Pool place | Result | Pool place | Result | Pool place | Result | Rank |
|---|---|---|---|---|---|---|---|---|---|
| Gustaf Armgarth | Foil | 4 losses | 6 | Did not advance | | | | | |
| Gustaf Armgarth | Sabre | 0 wins | 4 | Did not advance | | | | | |
| Gunnar Böös | Foil | 5 losses | 6 | Did not advance | | | | | |
| Georg Branting | Épée | 1 loss | 1 | 1 loss | 1 | 4 losses | 4 | Did not advance | |
| Knut Enell | Épée | 4 losses | 5 | Did not advance | | | | | |
| Åke Grönhagen | Épée | 5 losses | 6 | Did not advance | | | | | |
| Nils Grönvall | Foil | 3 losses | 4 | Did not advance | | | | | |
| Carl Hjorth | Foil | 1 loss | 2 | 3 losses | 4 | Did not advance | | | |
| Axel Jöhncke | Foil | 2 losses | 2 | 3 losses | 4 | Did not advance | | | |
| Carl-Gustaf Klerck | Sabre | 1 win | 4 | Did not advance | | | | | |
| Gustaf Lindblom | Épée | 3 losses | 1 | 2 losses | 2 | 3 losses | 4 | Did not advance | |
| Gunnar Lindholm | Sabre | 0 wins | 4 | Did not advance | | | | | |
| Sven Nordenström | Sabre | 2 wins | 3 | 4 losses | 5 | Did not advance | | | |
| Carl Personne | Foil | 4 losses | 6 | Did not advance | | | | | |
| Carl Personne | Sabre | Bye | | 1 loss | 2 | 0 wins | 6 | Did not advance | |
| Einar Sörensen | Épée | 1 loss | 1 | 1 loss | 1 | 1 loss | 1 | 3–4 | 5 |
| Louis Sparre | Épée | 2 losses | 3 | 4 losses | 5 | Did not advance | | | |
| Helge Werner | Sabre | 0 wins | 5 | Did not advance | | | | | |
| Sweden | Team épée | | | 1–0 | 1 | 3–0 | 1 | 1–2 | 4 |
| Sweden | Team sabre | | | 0–1 | 3 | Did not advance | | | |

== Football ==
Summary

Key:

- W – Win D – Draw L – Loss
- A.E.T – After extra time.
- RP – Game replayed

| Team | Event | First round | Quarterfinal | Semifinal | Final / BM | |
| Team | Event | Opposition Score | Opposition Score | Opposition Score | Opposition Score | Rank |
|---|---|---|---|---|---|---|
| Sweden men's | Men's tournament | Netherlands; L 3–4 (a.e.t.) | did not advance | | | =9 |

Round of 16

1912-06-29

| Netherlands | 4 – 3 (a.e.t.) | Sweden |
|---|---|---|
| Bouvy 28' 52'; Vos 43' 91' | | Swensson 3' 80'; E. Börjesson 62' |

Olympiastadion, Stockholm
Attendance: 14,000

== Gymnastics ==
| Gymnast | Events | Final | |
| Gymnast | Events | Result | Rank |
|---|---|---|---|
| Sweden | Team, Swedish system | 937.46 | 1 |

== Modern pentathlon ==
| Pentathlete | Event | Shooting | Swimming | Fencing | Equestrian | Athletics | Final | |
| Pentathlete | Event | Rank | Rank | Rank | Rank | Rank | Score | Rank |
|---|---|---|---|---|---|---|---|---|
| Gösta Åsbrink | Modern pentathlon | 1 | 4 | 15 | 7 | 1 | 28 | 2 |
| Eric Carlberg | Modern pentathlon | 8 | did not finish | | | | | |
| Åke Grönhagen | Modern pentathlon | 18 | 5 | 1 | 1 | 10 | 35 | 4 |
| Nils Häggström | Modern pentathlon | 13 | 15 | 18 | 20 | 2 | 68 | 12 |
| Erik de Laval | Modern pentathlon | 7 | 13 | 11 | did not finish | | | |
| Georg de Laval | Modern pentathlon | 2 | 3 | 10 | 3 | 12 | 30 | 3 |
| Patrik de Laval | Modern pentathlon | 5 | 17 | 13 | 17 | 20 | 72 | 14 |
| Gustaf Lewenhaupt | Modern pentathlon | 24 | 12 | 19 | 15 | 4 | 74 | 17 |
| Gösta Lilliehöök | Modern pentathlon | 3 | 10 | 5 | 4 | 5 | 27 | 1 |
| Bror Mannström | Modern pentathlon | 14 | 14 | 16 | 2 | 9 | 55 | 7 |
| James Stranne | Modern pentathlon | 11 | 9 | 3 | 8 | 11 | 42 | 6 |
| Erik Wersäll | Modern pentathlon | 9 | 8 | 21 | 19 | 6 | 63 | 9 |

== Rowing ==
| Rower | Cox | Events | Heat | | Quarterfinal | | Semifinal | | Final | |
| Rower | Cox | Events | Result | Rank | Result | Rank | Result | Rank | Result | Rank |
|---|---|---|---|---|---|---|---|---|---|---|
| Einar Amundén; Ragnar Bergstedt; Gustaf Broberg; Simon Ericsson; Ivar Ryberg; Anders Almqvist; Arvid Svendel; Leif Sörvik | Gillis Ahlberg | Eight | ? | ? | Did not advance | | | | | |
| Gustaf Brunkman; Per Mattson; Sebastian Tamm; Ted Wachtmeister; Conrad Brunkman; William Bruhn-Möller; Ture Rosvall; Herman Dahlbäck | Leo Wilkens | Eight | Bye | | ? | ? | Did not advance | | | |
| Tage Johnson; Axel Johansson; Axel Gabrielsson; Charles Gabrielsson | Wilhelm Brandes | Coxed four, inriggers | | | ? | ? | Did not advance | | | |
| John Lager; Axel Eriksson; Ernst Wetterstrand; Gunnar Lager | Karl Sundholm | Coxed four | ? | ? | Did not advance | | | | | |
| Ture Rosvall; William Bruhn-Möller; Conrad Brunkman; Herman Dahlbäck | Leo Wilkens | Coxed four, inriggers | | | 7:51.5 | 1 | 7:39.2 | 1 | 7:56.9 | 2nd place, silver medalist(s) |

== Sailing ==
| Sailor | Boat | Events | Race 1 | | | Race 2 | | | Race-off | | Final | |
| Sailor | Boat | Events | Time | Rank | Points | Time | Rank | Points | Time | Rank | Score | Rank |
|---|---|---|---|---|---|---|---|---|---|---|---|---|
| Otto Aust; Eric Sandberg; Harald Sandberg | Kerstin | 6 metre class | 2:44:54 | 6 | 0 | 2:26:44 | 3 | 1 | 2:42:32 | 1 | 1 | 3 |
| Per Bergman; Dick Bergström; Kurt Bergström; Hugo Clason; Folke Johnson; Sigurd Kander; Nils Lamby; Erik Lindqvist; Nils Persson; Richard Sällström | Ema Signe | 12 metre class | 3:24:13 | 2 | 3 | 3:48:06 | 2 | 3 | | | 6 | 2 |
| Bertil Bothén; Björn Bothén; Fred Forsberg; Erland Lindén; Arvid Perslow; Erik Waller | Marga | 10 metre class | 4:01:11 | 4 | 0 | 3:50:30 | 4 | 0 | | | 0 | 4 |
| Filip Ericsson; Carl Hellström; Paul Isberg; Humbert Lundén; Herman Nyberg; Harry Rosenswärd; Erik Wallerius; Harald Wallin | Kitty | 10 metre class | 3:46:04 | 1 | 7 | 3:43:51 | 1 | 7 | | | 14 | 1 |
| Ragnar Gripe; Thorsten Grönfors; Emil Hagström; Gunnar Månsson; Fritz Sjöqvist; Johan Sjöqvist | R. S. Y. C. | 8 metre class | 2:23:46 | 6 | 0 | 2:16:33 | 6 | 0 | | | 0 | 5 |
| Edvin Hagberg; Jonas Jonsson; Olof Mark | Sass | 6 metre class | 2:37:01 | 3 | 1 | 2:30:24 | 4 | 0 | 2:44:11 | 2 | 1 | 4 |
| Emil Henriques; Bengt Heyman; Alvar Thiel; Herbert Westermark; Nils Westermark | Sans Atout | 8 metre class | 2:16:40 | 2 | 3 | 2:16:04 | 4 | 0 | 2:26:44 | 2 | 3 | 2 |

== Shooting ==
| Shooter | Events | Final | |
| Shooter | Events | Result | Rank |
|---|---|---|---|
| Per-Olof Arvidsson | 300 m free rifle, 3 positions | 838 | 48 |
| Per-Olof Arvidsson | 300 m military rifle, 3 positions | 87 | 18 |
| Per-Olof Arvidsson | 100 m deer, single shot | 26 | 26 |
| Per-Olof Arvidsson | 100 m deer, double shot | 68 | 4 |
| Edward Benedicks | 100 m deer, single shot | 26 | 26 |
| Edward Benedicks | 100 m deer, double shot | 74 | 2 |
| Edward Benedicks | Trap | 34 | 38 |
| Carl Björkman | 300 m free rifle, 3 positions | 888 | 34 |
| Tönnes Björkman | 300 m free rifle, 3 positions | 947 | 8 |
| Tönnes Björkman | 600 m free rifle | 81 | 25 |
| Tönnes Björkman | 300 m military rifle, 3 positions | 88 | 14 |
| Erik Blomqvist | 300 m free rifle, 3 positions | 932 | 10 |
| Gustaf Boivie | 30 m rapid fire pistol | 272 | 11 |
| Gustaf Boivie | 50 m pistol | 401 | 42 |
| Gustaf Boivie | 25 m small-bore rifle | 212 | 15 |
| Otto Bökman | Trap | 10 | 56 |
| Erik Boström | 30 m rapid fire pistol | 274 | 17 |
| Erik Boström | 50 m pistol | 468 | 5 |
| Erik Boström | 50 m rifle, prone | 189 | 8 |
| Eric Carlberg | 30 m rapid fire pistol | 278 | 6 |
| Eric Carlberg | 50 m pistol | 452 | 12 |
| Eric Carlberg | 50 m rifle, prone | 186 | 17 |
| Eric Carlberg | 25 m small-bore rifle | 219 | 20 |
| Vilhelm Carlberg | 30 m rapid fire pistol | 274 | 15 |
| Vilhelm Carlberg | 50 m pistol | 446 | 16 |
| Vilhelm Carlberg | 50 m rifle, prone | 185 | 21 |
| Vilhelm Carlberg | 25 m small-bore rifle | 242 | 1 |
| Hugo Cederschiöld | 30 m rapid fire pistol | 225 | 37 |
| Hugo Cederschiöld | 50 m pistol | 352 | 51 |
| Adolph Cederström | 100 m deer, single shot | 37 | 8 |
| Wilhelm Dybäck | 100 m deer, double shots | 57 | 14 |
| Johan Ekman | 100 m deer, single shot | 34 | 11 |
| Johan Ekman | 100 m deer, double shot | 58 | 12 |
| Johan Ekman | Trap | 31 | 40 |
| Gideon Ericsson | 50 m pistol | 408 | 37 |
| Gideon Ericsson | 50 m rifle, prone | 157 | 39 |
| Gideon Ericsson | 25 m small-bore rifle | 231 | 3 |
| Herman Eriksson | Trap | 14 | 41 |
| Mauritz Eriksson | 300 m free rifle, 3 positions | 922 | 14 |
| Mauritz Eriksson | 600 m free rifle | 77 | 38 |
| Carl Flodström | 300 m military rifle, 3 positions | 91 | 8 |
| Hjalmar Frisell | 100 m deer, double shot | 58 | 12 |
| Hjalmar Frisell | Trap | 38 | 29 |
| Emil Gustafsson | 600 m free rifle | 85 | 15 |
| Axel Gyllenkrok | 30 m rapid fire pistol | 255 | 30 |
| Axel Gyllenkrok | 25 m small-bore rifle | 227 | 6 |
| Arvid Hoflund | 300 m military rifle, 3 positions | 70 | 64 |
| Johan Hübner von Holst | 30 m rapid fire pistol | 283 | 3 |
| Johan Hübner von Holst | 50 m rifle, prone | 189 | 9 |
| Johan Hübner von Holst | 25 m small-bore rifle | 233 | 2 |
| Werner Jernström | 300 m free rifle, 3 positions | 912 | 20 |
| Werner Jernström | 600 m free rifle | 88 | 6 |
| Werner Jernström | 300 m military rifle, 3 positions | 75 | 53 |
| Ernst Johansson | 50 m rifle, prone | 185 | 20 |
| Hugo Johansson | 300 m free rifle, 3 positions | 959 | 4 |
| Hugo Johansson | 600 m free rifle | 82 | 23 |
| Erik Jonsson | 300 m military rifle, 3 positions | 86 | 19 |
| Gustaf Adolf Jonsson | 300 m free rifle, 3 positions | 928 | 11 |
| Gustaf Adolf Jonsson | 300 m military rifle, 3 positions | 88 | 16 |
| Robert Jonsson | 300 m free rifle, 3 positions | 875 | 37 |
| Robert Jonsson | 600 m free rifle | 79 | 36 |
| Robert Jonsson | 25 m small-bore rifle | 143 | 35 |
| Nils Klein | Trap | 10 | 56 |
| Leon Lagerlöf | 600 m free rifle | 81 | 29 |
| Bernhard Larsson | 300 m free rifle, 3 positions | 954 | 6 |
| Karl Larsson | 100 m deer, single shot | 39 | 4 |
| Georg de Laval | 30 m rapid fire pistol | 277 | 7 |
| Georg de Laval | 50 m pistol | 470 | 4 |
| Patrik de Laval | 30 m rapid fire pistol | 268 | 13 |
| Emil Lindewald | 100 m deer, single shot | 27 | 24 |
| Emil Lindewald | 100 m deer, double shot | 64 | 8 |
| Anders Lindskog | 100 m deer, single shot | 39 | 4 |
| Anders Lindskog | 100 m deer, double shot | 67 | 6 |
| Robert Löfman | 50 m pistol | 423 | 29 |
| Robert Löfman | 50 m rifle, prone | 185 | 22 |
| Robert Löfman | 25 m small-bore rifle | 221 | 10 |
| Åke Lundeberg | 100 m deer, single shot | 41 | 2 |
| Åke Lundeberg | 100 m deer, double shot | 79 | 1 |
| Åke Lundeberg | Trap | 84 | 17 |
| Gustaf Lyman | 100 m deer, single shot | 31 | 15 |
| Gustaf Lyman | 100 m deer, double shot | 61 | 9 |
| Arthur Nordenswan | 50 m rifle, prone | 186 | 16 |
| Arthur Nordenswan | 25 m small-bore rifle | 200 | 28 |
| Herman Nyberg | Trap | 13 | 45 |
| Fredrik Nyström | 50 m pistol | 426 | 25 |
| Fredrik Nyström | 50 m rifle, prone | 187 | 15 |
| Torsten Nyström | 600 m free rifle | 69 | 66 |
| Torsten Nyström | 300 m military rifle, 3 positions | 81 | 40 |
| Erik Odelberg | 50 m rifle, prone | 179 | 28 |
| Erik Odelberg | 25 m small-bore rifle | 219 | 11 |
| Erik Ohlsson | 600 m free rifle | 81 | 28 |
| Erik Ohlsson | 300 m military rifle, 3 positions | 86 | 21 |
| Ruben Örtegren | 50 m rifle, prone | 186 | 19 |
| Ruben Örtegren | 600 m free rifle | 74 | 49 |
| Paul Palén | 30 m rapid fire pistol | 286 | 2 |
| Paul Palén | 50 m pistol | 410 | 36 |
| Nils Romander | 300 m military rifle, 3 positions | 94 | 5 |
| Franz-Albert Schartau | 30 m rapid fire pistol | 270 | 18 |
| Nils Skog | 300 m free rifle, 3 positions | 869 | 43 |
| Erik Sökjer-Petersén | 100 m deer, single shot | 34 | 11 |
| Erik Sökjer-Petersén | 100 m deer, double shot | 65 | 7 |
| Gustaf Stiernspetz | 50 m pistol | 357 | 48 |
| Per Stridfeldt | 300 m military rifle, 3 positions | 86 | 20 |
| Carl-Johan Sund | 600 m free rifle | 82 | 24 |
| Alfred Swahn | 100 m deer, single shot | 41 | 1 |
| Alfred Swahn | 100 m deer, double shot | 68 | 4 |
| Alfred Swahn | Trap | 82 | 21 |
| Oscar Swahn | 100 m deer, single shot | 39 | 4 |
| Oscar Swahn | 100 m deer, double shot | 72 | 3 |
| Oscar Swahn | Trap | 10 | 56 |
| Ivan Törnmarck | 30 m rapid fire pistol | 280 | 5 |
| Ivan Törnmarck | 50 m pistol | 453 | 11 |
| Axel Wahlstedt | 50 m rifle, prone | 187 | 11 |
| Axel Wahlstedt | 25 m small-bore rifle | 200 | 25 |
| Carl Wallenborg | 600 m free rifle | 87 | 11 |
| Carl Wallenborg | 300 m military rifle, 3 positions | 56 | 83 |
| Victor Wallenberg | Trap | 37 | 34 |
| August Wikström | 300 m free rifle, 3 positions | 870 | 42 |
| Carl Wollert | Trap | 10 | 56 |
| Per-Olof Arvidsson; Åke Lundeberg; Alfred Swahn; Oscar Swahn | 100 m team deer, single shot | 151 | 1 |
| Carl Björkman; Tönnes Björkman; Mauritz Eriksson; Werner Jernström; Hugo Johansson; Bernhard Larsson | Team rifle | 1570 | 3 |
| Carl Björkman; Erik Blomqvist; Mauritz Eriksson; Hugo Johansson; Gustaf Adolf Jonsson; Bernhard Larsson | Team free rifle | 5655 | 1 |
| Gustaf Boivie; Eric Carlberg; Vilhelm Carlberg; Johan Hübner von Holst | 25 m team small-bore rifle | 925 | 1 |
| Erik Boström; Eric Carlberg; Vilhelm Carlberg; Georg de Laval | 50 m team military pistol | 1849 | 2 |
| Eric Carlberg; Vilhelm Carlberg; Johan Hübner von Holst; Paul Palén | 30 m team military pistol | 1145 | 1 |
| Eric Carlberg; Vilhelm Carlberg; Arthur Nordenswan; Ruben Örtegren | 50 m team small-bore rifle | 748 | 2 |
| Johan Ekman; Hjalmar Frisell; Åke Lundeberg; Alfred Swahn; Victor Wallenberg; Carl Wollert | Team clay pigeons | 243 | 4 |

== Swimming ==
| Swimmer | Events | Heat | | Quarterfinal | | Semifinal | | Final | |
| Swimmer | Events | Result | Rank | Result | Rank | Result | Rank | Result | Rank |
|---|---|---|---|---|---|---|---|---|---|
| Erik Andersson | 100 m freestyle | 1:13:0 | ? | Did not advance | | | | | |
| Nils Andersson | 200 m breaststroke | | | 3:20.6 | 14 | Did not advance | | | |
| Nils Andersson | 400 m breaststroke | | | 7:17.0 | 13 | Did not advance | | | |
| Robert Andersson | 100 m freestyle | 1:09.4 | ? | 1:10.0 | 12 | Did not advance | | | |
| Vilhelm Andersson | 1500 m freestyle | | | 23:12.2 | 4 | 23:14.4 | 5 | Did not advance | |
| Åke Bergman | 100 m backstroke | | | 1:33.8 | 12 | Did not advance | | | |
| Erik Bergqvist | 100 m freestyle | 1:13.4 | ? | did not start | | Did not advance | | | |
| Elsa Björklund | 100 m freestyle | | | ? | ? | Did not advance | | | |
| Greta Carlsson | 100 m freestyle | | | ? | ? | Did not advance | | | |
| Gustav Collin | 1500 m freestyle | | | 27:05.2 | 13 | Did not advance | | | |
| Nils-Erik Haglund | 400 m freestyle | | | 6:23.4 | 17 | Did not advance | | | |
| Oscar Hamrén | 200 m breaststroke | | | ? | ? | Did not advance | | | |
| Pontus Hanson | 200 m breaststroke | | | 3:14.2 | 11 | did not finish | | Did not advance | |
| Sven Hanson | 200 m breaststroke | | | 3:24.4 | 18 | Did not advance | | | |
| Thor Henning | 200 m breaststroke | | | 3:14.0 | 10 | 3:10.4 | 5 | did not finish | |
| Thor Henning | 400 m breaststroke | | | 6:52.4 OR | 6 | 6:32.0 OR | 1 | 6:35.6 | 2 |
| Greta Johansson | 100 m freestyle | | | 1:41.4 | ? | Did not advance | | | |
| Sonja Johnsson | 100 m freestyle | | | ? | ? | Did not advance | | | |
| Harald Julin | 100 m freestyle | 1:11.8 | ? | did not start | | Did not advance | | | |
| Harald Julin | 200 m breaststroke | | | 3:12.8 | 8 | 3:10.6 | 5 | Did not advance | |
| Fredrik Löwenadler | 200 m breaststroke | | | 3:22.2 | 16 | Did not advance | | | |
| Hugo Lundevall | 100 m backstroke | | | 1:46.8 | 14 | Did not advance | | | |
| Karin Lundgren | 100 m freestyle | | | 1:44.8 | ? | Did not advance | | | |
| Gunnar Sundman | 100 m backstroke | | | 1:31.2 | 10 | 1:35.0 | ? | Did not advance | |
| David Theander | 400 m freestyle | | | did not finish | | Did not advance | | | |
| Vera Thulin | 100 m freestyle | | | 1:44.0 | ? | Did not advance | | | |
| Eskil Wedholm | 400 m freestyle | | | 6:29.8 | ? | Did not advance | | | |
| Eskil Wedholm | 1500 m freestyle | | | 27:38.0 | 14 | Did not advance | | | |
| Greta Carlsson; Greta Johansson; Sonja Johnsson; Vera Thulin | 4 × 100 m free relay | | | | | | | ? | 4 |

== Tennis ==
| Athlete | Event | Round of 64 | Round of 32 | Round of 16 | Quarterfinals | Semifinals | Finals | Rank |
| Athlete | Event | Opposition Score | Opposition Score | Opposition Score | Opposition Score | Opposition Score | Opposition Score | Rank |
|---|---|---|---|---|---|---|---|---|
| Edith Arnheim | Outdoor singles | | | Bye | Holmström (SWE); W – 4-6, 6-4, 6-1 | Köring (GER); L – 6-4, 6-3 | Bjurstedt (NOR); L – 6-2, 6-2 | 4 |
| Edith Arnheim | Indoor singles | | | Bye | Hannam (GBR); L – 7-5, 6-1 | Did not advance | | 5 |
| Curt Benckert | Outdoor singles | Zborzil (AUT); L – 6-2, 6-4, 1-6, 6-3 | Did not advance | | | | | 31 |
| Wollmar Boström | Outdoor singles | Smith (NOR); W – 6-2, 6-4, 6-1 | von Salm (AUT); L – 7-5, 6-4, 6-1 | Did not advance | | | | 17 |
| Wollmar Boström | Indoor singles | | Lowe (GBR); L – 5-7, 6-4, 6-4, 6-4 | Did not advance | | | | 16 |
| Ellen Brusewitz | Outdoor singles | | | Cederschiöld (SWE); L – 8-6, 8-6 | Did not advance | | | 7 |
| Margareta Cederschiöld | Outdoor singles | | | Brusewitz (SWE); W – 8-6, 8-6 | Broquedis (FRA); L – 6-1, 6-4 | Did not advance | | 5 |
| Margareta Cederschiöld | Indoor singles | | | Parton (GBR); L – 6-0, 6-1 | Did not advance | | | 8 |
| Sigrid Fick | Outdoor singles | | | Köring (GER); L – 7-5, 6-3 | Did not advance | | | 7 |
| Sigrid Fick | Indoor singles | | | Bye | Holmström (SWE); W – 6-1, 6-1 | Castenschiold (DEN); L – 6-4, 6-4 | Parton (GBR); L – 6-3, 6-3 | 4 |
| Thorsten Grönfors | Outdoor singles | Bye | Ingerslev (DEN); L – 6-1, 6-2, 6-2 | Did not advance | | | | 17 |
| Thorsten Grönfors | Indoor singles | | Bye | Wilding (ANZ); L – 6-3, 6-3, 6-3 | Did not advance | | | 9 |
| Annie Holmström | Outdoor singles | | | Bye | Arnheim (SWE); L – 4-6, 6-4, 6-1 | Did not advance | | 5 |
| Annie Holmström | Indoor singles | | | Bye | Fick (SWE); L – 6-1, 6-1 | Did not advance | | 5 |
| Johan Kempe | Indoor singles | | Hainz (BOH); W – 6-1, 6-4, 3-6, 6-3 | Gobert (FRA); L – 6-1, 6-2, 7-5 | Did not advance | | | 9 |
| Hakon Leffler | Outdoor singles | Kitson (RSA); L – 6-2, 6-1, 6-0 | Did not advance | | | | | 31 |
| Hakon Leffler | Indoor singles | | Gore (GBR); L – 7-5, 6-4, 7-5 | Did not advance | | | | 16 |
| Frans Möller | Outdoor singles | Bye | Kitson (RSA); L – 6-2, 6-2, 6-3 | Did not advance | | | | 17 |
| Frans Möller | Indoor singles | | Caridia (GBR); L – 6-2, 7-5, 3-6, 6-4 | Did not advance | | | | 16 |
| Carl Setterwall | Outdoor singles | Blom (NED); W – 6-3, 6-3, 8-6 | Sumarokow (RUS); L – 6-2, 6-3, 11-13, 6-2 | Did not advance | | | | 17 |
| Carl Setterwall | Indoor singles | | Bye | Barrett (GBR); W – 4-6, 6-1, 6-4, 6-8, 6-4 | Lowe (GBR); L – 6-4, 1-6, 6-3, 8-6 | Did not advance | | 5 |
| Lennart Silverstolpe | Indoor singles | | Wilding (ANZ); L – 6-0, 6-1, 6-1 | Did not advance | | | | 16 |
| Charles Wennergren | Outdoor singles | Zeman (BOH); W – 6-1, 6-0, 6-0 | Rovsing (DEN); W – 4-6, 9-7, 6-8, 6-1, 6-1 | von Salm (AUT); L – 6-3, 5-7, 7-5, 6-1 | Did not advance | | | 9 |
| Charles Wennergren | Indoor singles | | Bye | Lowe (GBR); L – 6-4, 6-1, 6-4 | Did not advance | | | 9 |
| Edith Arnheim; Carl-Olof Nylén | Outdoor doubles | | | Broquedis/Canet (FRA); L – 6-2, 6-4 | Did not advance | | | 5 |
| Edith Arnheim; Carl-Olof Nylén | Indoor doubles | | | Aitchison/Barrett (GBR); L – 6-2, 6-4 | Did not advance | | | 7 |
| Curt Benckert; Wollmar Boström | Outdoor doubles | | Bye | Bye | Pipes/Zborzil (AUT); L – 6-3, 4-6, 6-1, 6-1 | Did not advance | | 5 |
| Curt Benckert; Wollmar Boström | Indoor doubles | | | Bye | Barrett/Gore (GBR); L – 7-5, 6-4, 6-1 | Did not advance | | 5 |
| Margareta Cederschiöld; Carl Kempe | Indoor doubles | | | Bye | Bye | Dixon/Hannam (GBR); L – 6-2, 6-2 | Fick/Setterwall (SWE); L – ? | 4 |
| Sigrid Fick; Carl Setterwall | Outdoor doubles | | | Bye | Grönfors/Holmström (SWE); W – 8-6, 10-8 | Bye | Köring/Schomburgk (GER); L – 6-4, 6-0 | 2 |
| Sigrid Fick; Carl Setterwall | Indoor doubles | | | Bye | Bye | Aitchison/Herbert Barrett (GBR); L – 3-6, 6-1, 6-2 | Cederschiöld/Kempe (SWE); W – ? | 3 |
| Thorsten Grönfors; Annie Holmström | Outdoor doubles | | | Bjursted/Langaard (NOR); W – 6-4, 4-6, 7-5 | Fick/Setterwall (SWE); L – 8-6, 10-8 | Did not advance | | 4 |
| Ebba Hay; Frans Möller | Indoor doubles | | | Mavrogordato/Parton (GBR); L – 6-3, 6-0 | Did not advance | | | 7 |
| Johan Kempe; Carl Setterwall | Indoor doubles | | | Caridia/Mavrogordato (GBR); W – 6-4, 4-6, 6-8, 6-2, 6-3 | Bye | Barrett/Gore (GBR); W – 4-6, 3-6, 6-1, 6-4, 6-3 | Germot/Gobert (FRA); L – 6-4, 12-14, 6-2, 6-4 | 2 |
| Frans Möller; Thorsten Grönfors | Outdoor doubles | | Heyden/Spiess (GER); L – 3-6, 6-4, 6-2, 4-6, 6-1 | Did not advance | | | | 15 |
| Carl-Olof Nylén; Charles Wennergren | Outdoor doubles | | | Madsen/Thayssen (DEN); W – 6-1, 6-2, 6-4 | Kitson/Winslow (RSA); W – 6-3, 7-5, 6-1 | Did not advance | | 5 |
| Carl-Olof Nylén; Charles Wennergren | Indoor doubles | | | Lowe/Lowe (GBR); L – 9-7, 11-9, 6-2 | Did not advance | | | 7 |

== Tug of war ==
| Athlete | Event | Finals | Rank |
| Athlete | Event | Opposition Score | Rank |
|---|---|---|---|
| Arvid Andersson; Adolf Bergman; Johan Edman; Erik Algot Fredriksson; Carl Jonsson; Erik Larsson; August Gustafsson; Herbert Lindström | Tug of war | Great Britain; W – 2-0 | 1 |

== Water polo ==
Summary

| Team | Event | Gold medal round | | | Silver medal round | | | | Rank |
| Team | Event | Quarterfinal | Semifinal | Final | First round | Second round | Semifinal | Final | Rank |
| Team | Event | Opposition Score | Opposition Score | Opposition Score | Opposition Score | Opposition Score | Opposition Score | Opposition Score | Rank |
|---|---|---|---|---|---|---|---|---|---|
| Sweden men | Men's tournament | France; W 7–2 | Great Britain; L 3–6 | Did not advance | Bye | Austria; W 8–1 | Bye | Belgium; W 4–2 | 2nd place, silver medalist(s) |

Quarterfinals

| July 7, 1912 | Sweden | 7–2 | France | Djurgårdsbrunnsviken |
| July 7, 1912 | R. Andersson 3, Bergqvist 3, ? | Goals | Decoin, Provost | Djurgårdsbrunnsviken |

Semifinals

| July 11, 1912 | Great Britain | 6–3 | Sweden | Djurgårdsbrunnsviken |
| July 11, 1912 | Wilkinson (3), Hill, Radmilovic, Bentham | Goals | R. Andersson (2), V. Andersson | Djurgårdsbrunnsviken |

Repechage second round

| July 14, 1912 | Sweden | 8–1 | Austria | Djurgårdsbrunnsviken |
| July 14, 1912 | R. Andersson (3), Bergqvist (3), V. Andersson (2) | Goals | Scheff | Djurgårdsbrunnsviken |

Silver medal match

| July 16, 1912 | Sweden | 4–2 | Belgium | Djurgårdsbrunnsviken |
| July 16, 1912 | Bergqvist (2), V. Andersson, R. Andersson | Goals | ?, ? | Djurgårdsbrunnsviken |

== Wrestling ==
| Wrestler | Event | First round | Second round | Third round | Fourth round | Fifth round | Sixth round | Seventh round | Final | | | Rank |
| Wrestler | Event | Opp. Result | Opp. Result | Opp. Result | Opp. Result | Opp. Result | Opp. Result | Opp. Result | Match A opp. Result | Match B opp. Result | Match C opp. Result | Rank |
|---|---|---|---|---|---|---|---|---|---|---|---|---|
| Anders Ahlgren | G-R light heavy | Bye | Martin (FRA); Win Christensen (DEN); Win | Lind (FIN); Win | Gardini (ITA); Win | Lindberg (FIN); Win | Bye | | Varga (HUN); Win | Bye | Böhling (FIN); Draw | 2 |
| Bruno Åkesson | G-R feather | Hestdahl (NOR); Loss #1 | Taylor (GBR); Win | Withdrew | Did not advance | | | | | | | 19 |
| Carl-Georg Andersson | G-R feather | Hansen (DEN); Win | Schärer (AUT); Loss #1 | Pereira (POR); Win | Koskelo (FIN); Loss #2 | Did not advance | | | | | | 12 |
| Johan Andersson | G-R light heavy | Kopřiva (BOH); Win | Pikker (RUS); Win | Lange (GER); Loss #1 | Varga (HUN); Loss #2 | Did not advance | | | Did not advance | | | 10 |
| Mauritz Andersson | G-R middle | Barrier (FRA); Win | Carcereri (ITA); Win | Lundstein (FIN); Loss #1 | Asikainen (FIN); Loss #2 | Did not advance | | | | | | 11 |
| Arvid Beckman | G-R feather | Lasanen (FIN); Loss #1 | Gullaksen (NOR); Win | Arneson (NOR); Win | Kangas (FIN); Loss #2 | Did not advance | | | | | | 12 |
| Theodor Bergqvist | G-R middle | Miskey (HUN); Loss #1 | Klein (RUS); Loss #2 | Did not advance | | | | | | | | 26 |
| Hugo Björklund | G-R light | Phelps (GBR); Win | Heckel (GER); Loss #1 | Kolehmainen (FIN); Loss #2 | Did not advance | | | | | | | 23 |
| Theodor Dahlberg | G-R middle | Westerlund (FIN); Loss #1 | Siewierow (RUS); Loss #2 | Did not advance | | | | | | | | 26 |
| Karl Ekman | G-R light heavy | Varga (HUN); Loss #1 | Lindberg (FIN); Loss #2 | Did not advance | | | | | Did not advance | | | 19 |
| Edvin Fältström | G-R middle | Antonopoulos (GRE); Win | Kokotowitsch (AUT); Win | Merkle (GER); Loss #1 | Gargano (ITA); Win | Jokinen (FIN); Loss #2 | Did not advance | | | | | 7 |
| Bror Flygare | G-R light | Halík (BOH); Win | Radvány (HUN); Loss #1 | Withdrew | Did not advance | | | | | | | 29 |
| Ragnar Fogelmark | G-R light heavy | Salila (FIN); Loss #1 | Eriksen (DEN); Loss #2 | Did not advance | | | | | Did not advance | | | 19 |
| Axel Frank | G-R middle | Aleksandr Siewierow (RUS); Win | Westerlund (FIN); Win | Totuschek (AUT); Loss #1 | Withdrew | Did not advance | | | | | | 11 |
| Claës-Axel Wersäll | G-R middle | Totuschek (AUT); Win | Tirkkonen (FIN); Win | Siewierow (RUS); Win | Lundstein (FIN); Win | Asikainen (FIN); Loss #1 | Jokinen (FIN); Win | Åberg (FIN); Win | Bye | Asikainen (FIN); Win | Klein (RUS); Win | 1 |
| Frits Johansson | G-R middle | Hansen (DEN); Win | Somogyi (HUN); Win | Tirkkonen (FIN); Loss #1 | Holm (FIN); Loss #2 | Did not advance | | | | | | 11 |
| Hugo Johansson | G-R feather | Andersen (GER); Win | Lysohn (USA); Win | Gerstäcker (GER); Loss #1 | Pongrácz (HUN); Win | Lasanen (FIN); Loss #2 | Did not advance | | | | | 14 |
| Martin Jonsson | G-R light | Sándor (HUN); Loss #1 | Saeurhöfer (GER); Loss #2 | Did not advance | | | | | | | | 29 |
| David Karlsson | G-R heavy | Saarela (FIN); Loss #1 | Pelander (FIN); Loss #2 | Did not advance | | | | | Did not advance | | | 12 |
| Karl Karlsson | G-R feather | Pawłowicz (RUS); Loss #1 | Beránek (BOH); Loss #2 | Did not advance | | | | | | | | 26 |
| Harry Larsson | G-R feather | Stein (GER); Win | Kangas (FIN); Win | Ankondinow (RUS); Win | Lasanen (FIN); Loss #1 | Leivonen (FIN); Loss #2 | Did not advance | | | | | 9 |
| Frans Lindstrand | G-R heavy | Gerstmans (BEL); Win | Olin (FIN); Loss #1 | Saarela (FIN); Loss #2 | Did not advance | | | | Did not advance | | | 9 |
| Carl Lund | G-R light | Heckel (GER); Win | Phelps (GBR); Win | Tanttu (FIN); Loss #1 | Kolehmainen (FIN); Win | Bye | Wikström (FIN); Win | Radvány (HUN); Loss #2 | Did not advance | | | 4 |
| Gustaf Malmström | G-R light | Urvikko (FIN); Win | Tirkkonen (FIN); Win | Márkus (HUN); Win | Fischer (AUT); Win | Wikström (FIN); Win | Väre (FIN); Loss #1 | Bye | Bye | Mattiasson (SWE); Win | Väre (FIN); Loss | 2 |
| Edvin Mattiasson | G-R light | Dumrauf (GER); Win | Cabal (FRA); Win | Wikström (FIN); Loss #1 | Orosz (HUN); Win | Lofthus (NOR); Win | Balej (BOH); Win | Bye | Väre (FIN); Loss | Malmström (SWE); Loss | Bye | 3 |
| Wiktor Melin | G-R middle | Lundstein (FIN); Loss #1 | Withdrew | Did not advance | | | | | | | | 26 |
| Ernst Nilsson | G-R light heavy | Christensen (DEN); Loss #1 | Kopřiva (BOH); Win | Gardini (ITA); Win | Lindberg (FIN); Loss #2 | Did not advance | | | Did not advance | | | 10 |
| Johan Nilsson | G-R light | Saeurhöfer (GER); Win | Sándor (HUN); Win | Lofthus (NOR); Win | Wikström (FIN); Loss #1 | Salonen (FIN); Win | Radvány (HUN); Loss #2 | Did not advance | | | | 6 |
| Erik Öberg | G-R feather | Taylor (GBR); Win | Hestdahl (NOR); Win | Leivonen (FIN); Loss #1 | Pawłowicz (RUS); Win | Lehmusvirta (FIN); Win | Haapanen (FIN); Win | Lasanen (FIN); Loss #2 | Did not advance | | | 4 |
| Sven Ohlsson | G-R middle | Sint (NED); Loss #1 | Miskey (HUN); Loss #2 | Did not advance | | | | | | | | 26 |
| Ewald Persson | G-R feather | Gullaksen (NOR); Loss #1 | Lasanen (FIN); Loss #2 | Did not advance | | | | | | | | 26 |
| Richard Rydström | G-R light | Orosz (HUN); Loss #1 | Wikström (FIN); Loss #2 | Did not advance | | | | | | | | 29 |
| Alrik Sandberg | G-R heavy | Lindfors (FIN); Loss #1 | Pelander (FIN); Loss #2 | Did not advance | | | | | Did not advance | | | 12 |
| Gottfrid Svenson | G-R light | Laitinen (FIN); Loss #1 | Frydenlund (NOR); Win | Radvány (HUN); Win | Balej (BOH); Loss #2 | Did not advance | | | | | | 16 |
