= Tennis at the 1912 Summer Olympics – Mixed indoor doubles =

Tennis at the Olympics

Mixed indoor doubles tennis at the Games of the V Olympiad
- Dates: 6–7 May 1912 (first round); 8 May 1912 (quarterfinals); 9 May 1912 (semifinals); 12 May 1912 (final)
- Competitors: 10 teams from 5 nations

Medalists
1st place, gold medalist(s)		Edith Hannam; Charles Dixon	Great Britain
2nd place, silver medalist(s)		Helen Aitchison; Herbert Roper Barrett	Great Britain
3rd place, bronze medalist(s)		Sigrid Fick; Gunnar Setterwall	Sweden

Mixed indoor doubles
- Tennis at the 1912 Summer Olympics

Events
Outdoor
Singles	men	women
Doubles	men		mixed
Indoor
Singles	men	women
Doubles	men		mixed
- Summer Olympics

The indoor mixed doubles competition at the 1912 Summer Olympics was part of the tennis program for the games. The competition was held from May 6, 1912 to May 12, 1912.

== Draw ==
Key

- Q = Qualifier
- WC = Wild card
- LL = Lucky loser
- Alt = Alternate
- ITF = ITF entry
- PR = Protected ranking
- SR = Special ranking
- SE = Special exempt
- JE = Junior exempt
- JR = Junior Accelerator Programme entrant
- CO = College Accelerator Programme entrant
- NG = Next Gen Accelerator Program entrant
- w/o = Walkover
- r = Retired
- d = Defaulted

=== Draw ===
First round
E Arnheim (SWE); C-O Nylén (SWE)	4	1
H Aitchison (GBR); HR Barrett (GBR)	6	6
M Parton (GBR); T Mavrogordato (GBR)	6	6
E Hay (SWE); F Möller (SWE)	3	0

Quarterfinals
S Fick (SWE); G Setterwall (SWE)
M Šebková (BOH); J Šebek (BOH)	w/o
S Castenschiold (DEN); E Larsen (DEN)	0	3
H Aitchison (GBR); HR Barrett (GBR)	6	6
M Parton (GBR); T Mavrogordato (GBR)	6	4	3
E Hannam (GBR); C Dixon (GBR)	2	6	6
M Cederschiöld (SWE); C Kempe (SWE)
M Decugis (FRA); M Decugis (FRA)	w/o

Semifinals
S Fick (SWE); G Setterwall (SWE)	6	1	2
H Aitchison (GBR); HR Barrett (GBR)	3	6	6
E Hannam (GBR); C Dixon (GBR)	6	6
M Cederschiöld (SWE); C Kempe (SWE)	2	2

Final (gold-medal match)
H Aitchison (GBR); HR Barrett (GBR)	6	3	2
E Hannam (GBR); C Dixon (GBR)	4	6	6
Bronze-medal match
S Fick (SWE); G Setterwall (SWE)
M Cederschiöld (SWE); C Kempe (SWE)	w/o
