= Tennis at the 1912 Summer Olympics – Mixed outdoor doubles =

Tennis at the Olympics

Mixed doubles tennis at the Games of the V Olympiad
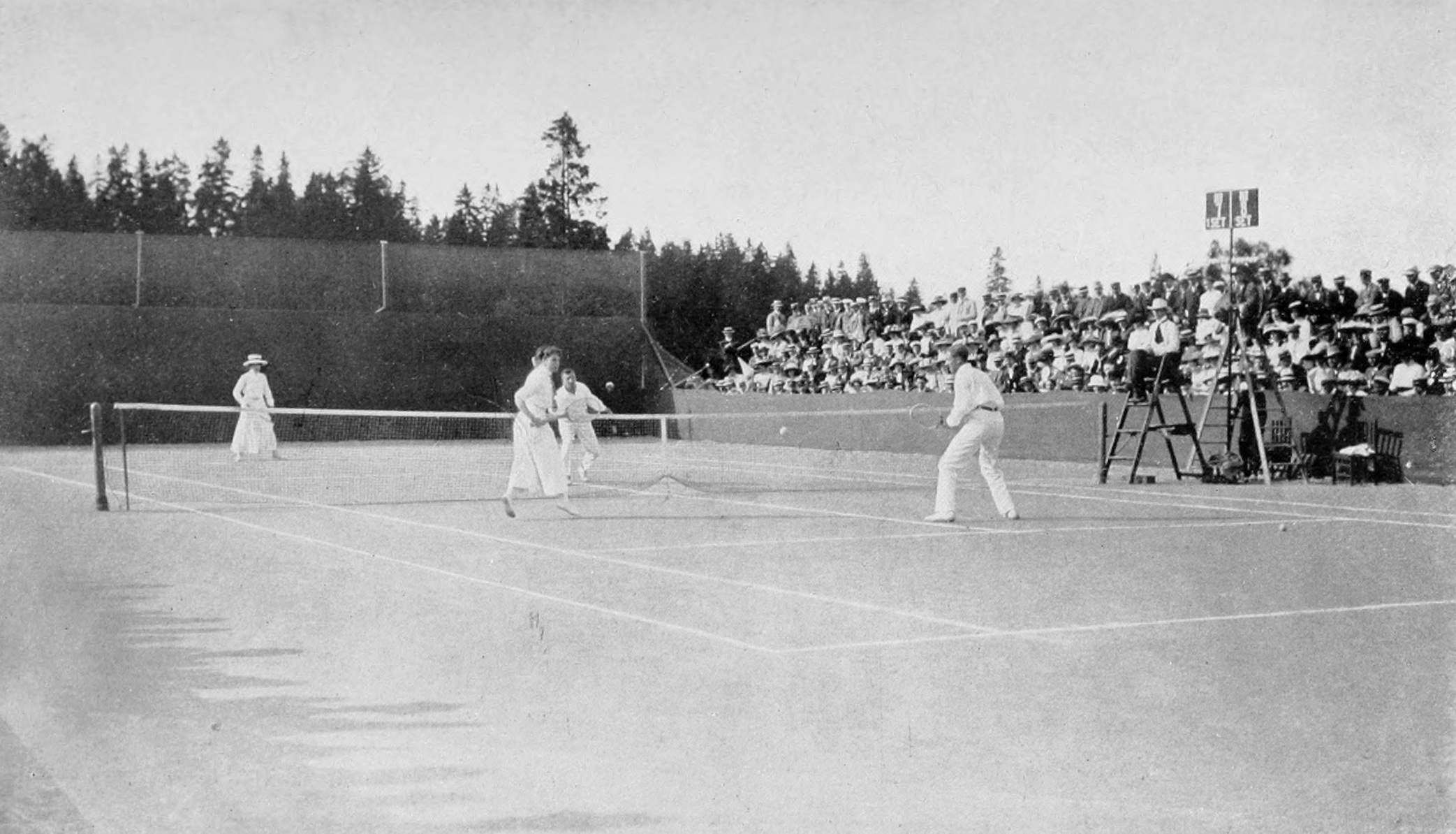
- The final match
- Venue: Östermalms IP
- Dates: July 1, 1912 (first round); July 3, 1912 (quarterfinals); July 4, 1912 (semifinals); July 5, 1912 (final)
- Competitors: 12 from 4 nations
- Teams: 6

Medalists
1st place, gold medalist(s)		Germany: Dorothea Köring; Heinrich Schomburgk
2nd place, silver medalist(s)		Sweden: Sigrid Fick; Gunnar Setterwall
3rd place, bronze medalist(s)		France: Marguerite Broquedis; Albert Canet

Mixed outdoor doubles
- Tennis at the 1912 Summer Olympics

Events
Outdoor
Singles	men	women
Doubles	men		mixed
Indoor
Singles	men	women
Doubles	men		mixed
- Summer Olympics

The outdoor mixed doubles competition at the 1912 Summer Olympics was part of the tennis program for the games. It was held from 1 to 5 July at Östermalms IP. 13 teams entered, but only 6 played (12 competitors from 4 nations). The event was won by German pair Dorothea Köring and Heinrich Schomburgk. The silver medalists were Sweden's Sigrid Fick and Gunnar Setterwall, while French team Marguerite Broquedis and Albert Canet took bronze.

== Background ==
This was the second appearance of mixed doubles tennis. The event was first held in 1900 and would not be held again until 1912 (when both outdoor and indoor versions were held); it would then be held the next two Games in 1920 and 1924. Tennis was not a medal sport from 1928 to 1984, though there were demonstration events in 1968 (which included mixed doubles) and 1984 (which did not). Mixed doubles did not return with the rest of the tennis programme in 1988; instead, it was not until 2012 that mixed doubles returned to the programme, where it has been since.

There were no British or American players, with the event overlapping Wimbledon. Germany's mixed doubles champions Dorothea Köring and Heinrich Schomburgk were the strongest players among a weak field.

Germany, Norway, and Sweden each made their debut in the event. France competed for the second time, the only returning nation from 1900.

== Competition format ==
The competition was a single-elimination tournament with a bronze-medal match (cancelled due to withdrawals). All matches were best-of-three sets.

== Schedule ==
Date	Time	Round
Monday, 1 July 1912		Round of 16
Wednesday, 3 July 1912		Quarterfinals
Thursday, 4 July 1912		Semifinals
Friday, 5 July 1912		Final

== Draw ==
Key

- Q = Qualifier
- WC = Wild card
- LL = Lucky loser
- Alt = Alternate
- ITF = ITF entry
- PR = Protected ranking
- SR = Special ranking
- SE = Special exempt
- JE = Junior exempt
- JR = Junior Accelerator Programme entrant
- CO = College Accelerator Programme entrant
- NG = Next Gen Accelerator Program entrant
- w/o = Walkover
- r = Retired
- d = Defaulted

=== Draw ===
First round
E Arnheim (SWE); C-O Nylén (SWE)	2	4
M Broquedis (FRA); A Canet (FRA)	6	6
J von Lobkowitz (BOH); J Just (BOH)
J Kubešová (BOH); A Kubeš (BOH)	w/o
V Bjurstedt (NOR); T Smith (NOR)	w/o
D Köring (GER); H Schomburgk (GER)
S Fick (SWE); G Setterwall (SWE)
M Šebková (BOH); J Šebek (BOH)	w/o
A Holmström (SWE); T Grönfors (SWE)	6	4	7
M Bjurstedt (NOR); C Langaard (NOR)	4	6	5

Quarterfinals
M Cederschiöld (SWE); C Kempe (SWE)	w/o
M Broquedis (FRA); A Canet (FRA)
J von Lobkowitz (BOH); J Just (BOH)	w/o
D Köring (GER); H Schomburgk (GER)
S Fick (SWE); G Setterwall (SWE)	8	10
A Holmström (SWE); T Grönfors (SWE)	6	8
G Kaminski (GER); O von Müller (GER)	w/o
M Rieck (GER); O Kreuzer (GER)

Semifinals
M Broquedis (FRA); A Canet (FRA)	2	3
D Köring (GER); H Schomburgk (GER)	6	6
S Fick (SWE); G Setterwall (SWE)
M Rieck (GER); O Kreuzer (GER)	w/o

Final (gold-medal match)
D Köring (GER); H Schomburgk (GER)	6	6
S Fick (SWE); G Setterwall (SWE)	4	0
Bronze-medal match
M Broquedis (FRA); A Canet (FRA)
M Rieck (GER); O Kreuzer (GER)	w/o
