= Tennis at the 1912 Summer Olympics – Women's outdoor singles =

Tennis at the Olympics

Women's singles tennis at the Games of the V Olympiad
- Gold medalist Marguerite Broquedis
- Venue: Östermalms IP
- Dates: 1 July 1912 (first round); 3 July 1912 (quarterfinals, semifinals); 4 July 1912 (final, bronze match)
- Competitors: 8 from 4 nations

Medalists
1st place, gold medalist(s)		Marguerite Broquedis	France
2nd place, silver medalist(s)		Dorothea Köring	Germany
3rd place, bronze medalist(s)		Molla Mallory	Norway

Women's outdoor singles
- Tennis at the 1912 Summer Olympics

Events
Outdoor
Singles	men	women
Doubles	men		mixed
Indoor
Singles	men	women
Doubles	men		mixed
- Summer Olympics

The outdoor women's singles competition at the 1912 Summer Olympics was part of the tennis program for the games. It was held from 1 to 4 July at Östermalms IP. 12 women from 5 nations entered, but only 8 players from 4 nations actually competed. The event was won by Marguerite Broquedis of France, the nation's first victory in the women's singles. Dorothea Köring of Germany took silver and Molla Mallory of Norway earned bronze; both nations were making their debut in women's singles.

== Background ==
This was the third appearance of the women's singles tennis. A women's event was held only once during the first three Games (only men's tennis was played in 1896 and 1904), but has been held at every Olympics for which there was a tennis tournament since 1908. Tennis was not a medal sport from 1928 to 1984, though there were demonstration events in 1968 and 1984.

Reigning Olympic champion Dorothea Douglass Lambert Chambers had won at Wimbledon in 1903, 1904, 1906, 1910, and 1911 (and would win two more times after the Games); she would have been heavily favoured if she had returned. Another top player that was absent was American Margaret Browne. Of the players that were present in Stockholm, German champion Dorothea Köring probably had the best resume at the time. Marguerite Broquedis (who would later win the French championship twice) and Molla Mallory (then of Norway, but who would later move to the United States and win 8 U.S. championships) were both in the early stages of their careers.

Germany, Norway, and Sweden each made their debut in the event. France made its second appearance, matching Great Britain as the two nations that had competed in two of the three editions of the women's singles tournament to that point.

== Competition format ==
The competition was a single-elimination tournament with a bronze-medal match. All matches were best-of-three sets.

== Schedule ==
Date	Time	Round
Monday, 1 July 1912	9:00	Round of 16
Wednesday, 3 July 1912	9:00; 14:00	Quarterfinals; Semifinals
Thursday, 4 July 1912	11:00; 15:15	Bronze medal match Final

== Draw ==
Key

- Q = Qualifier
- WC = Wild card
- LL = Lucky loser
- Alt = Alternate
- ITF = ITF entry
- PR = Protected ranking
- SR = Special ranking
- SE = Special exempt
- JE = Junior exempt
- JR = Junior Accelerator Programme entrant
- CO = College Accelerator Programme entrant
- NG = Next Gen Accelerator Program entrant
- w/o = Walkover
- r = Retired
- d = Defaulted

=== Draw ===
First round
S Fick (SWE)	5	3
D Köring (GER)	7	6
V Bjurstedt (NOR)
M Rieck (GER)	w/o
E Brusewitz (SWE)	6	6
M Cederschiöld (SWE)	8	8
M Broquedis (FRA)
J von Lobkowitz (BOH)	w/o

Quarterfinals
A Holmström (SWE)	6	4	1
E Arnheim (SWE)	4	6	6
D Köring (GER)
V Bjurstedt (NOR)	w/o
M Cederschiöld (SWE)	1	4
M Broquedis (FRA)	6	6
M Mallory (NOR)
G Kaminski (GER)	w/o

Semifinals
E Arnheim (SWE)	4	3
D Köring (GER)	6	6
M Broquedis (FRA)	6	2	6
M Mallory (NOR)	3	6	4

Final (gold-medal match)
D Köring (GER)	6	3	4
M Broquedis (FRA)	4	6	6
Bronze-medal match
E Arnheim (SWE)	2	2
M Mallory (NOR)	6	6
