= Tennis at the 1912 Summer Olympics – Men's indoor doubles =

Tennis at the Olympics

Men's indoor doubles tennis at the Games of the V Olympiad
- Dates: 6–11 May 1912
- Competitors: 11 teams from 4 nations

Medalists
1st place, gold medalist(s)		Maurice Germot; André Gobert	France
2nd place, silver medalist(s)		Carl Kempe; Gunnar Setterwall	Sweden
3rd place, bronze medalist(s)		Alfred Beamish; Charles Dixon	Great Britain

Men's indoor doubles
- Tennis at the 1912 Summer Olympics

Events
Outdoor
Singles	men	women
Doubles	men		mixed
Indoor
Singles	men	women
Doubles	men		mixed
- Summer Olympics

The Indoor men's doubles competition at the 1912 Summer Olympics was part of the tennis program for the games.

== Draw ==
Key

- Q = Qualifier
- WC = Wild card
- LL = Lucky loser
- Alt = Alternate
- ITF = ITF entry
- PR = Protected ranking
- SR = Special ranking
- SE = Special exempt
- JE = Junior exempt
- JR = Junior Accelerator Programme entrant
- CO = College Accelerator Programme entrant
- NG = Next Gen Accelerator Program entrant
- w/o = Walkover
- r = Retired
- d = Defaulted

=== Draw ===
First round
A Lowe (GBR); G Lowe (GBR)	9	11	6
C-O Nylén (SWE); C Wennergren (SWE)	7	9	2
M Germot (FRA); A Gobert (FRA)
J Hainz (BOH); J Šebek (BOH)	w/o
G Caridia (GBR); T Mavrogordato (GBR)	4	6	8	2	3
C Kempe (SWE); G Setterwall (SWE)	6	4	6	6	6

Quarterfinals
A Beamish (GBR); C Dixon (GBR)
J Just (BOH); K Robětín (BOH)	w/o
A Lowe (GBR); G Lowe (GBR)	6	8	4	2	3
M Germot (FRA); A Gobert (FRA)	3	6	6	6	6
C Kempe (SWE); G Setterwall (SWE)
T Grönfors (SWE); F Möller (SWE)	w/o
HR Barrett (GBR); A Gore (GBR)	7	6	6
W Boström (SWE); C Benckert (SWE)	5	4	1

Semifinals
A Beamish (GBR); C Dixon (GBR)	3	1	2
M Germot (FRA); A Gobert (FRA)	6	6	6
C Kempe (SWE); G Setterwall (SWE)	4	3	6	6	6
HR Barrett (GBR); A Gore (GBR)	6	6	1	4	3

Final (gold-medal match)
M Germot (FRA); A Gobert (FRA)	4	14	6	6
C Kempe (SWE); G Setterwall (SWE)	6	12	2	4
Bronze-medal match
A Beamish (GBR); C Dixon (GBR)	6	0	6	4	6
HR Barrett (GBR); A Gore (GBR)	2	6	2	6	3
