= Tennis at the 1912 Summer Olympics – Women's indoor singles =

Tennis at the Olympics

Women's indoor singles tennis at the Games of the V Olympiad
- Dates: 6 May 1912 (first round); 6–7 May 1912 (quarterfinals); 9–10 May 1912 (semifinals); 11 May 1912 (final, bronze match)
- Competitors: 10 from 4 nations

Medalists
| 1st place, gold medalist(s) | | Edith Hannam | Great Britain |
| 2nd place, silver medalist(s) | | Sofie Castenschiold | Denmark |
| 3rd place, bronze medalist(s) | | Mabel Parton | Great Britain |

Women's indoor singles
- Tennis at the 1912 Summer Olympics

Events
Outdoor
| Singles | men | women |
| Doubles | men | | mixed |
Indoor
| Singles | men | women |
| Doubles | men | | mixed |
- Summer Olympics

The indoor women's singles competition at the 1912 Summer Olympics was part of the tennis program for the games.

== Draw ==
Key

- Q = Qualifier
- WC = Wild card
- LL = Lucky loser
- Alt = Alternate
- ITF = ITF entry
- PR = Protected ranking
- SR = Special ranking
- SE = Special exempt
- JE = Junior exempt
- JR = Junior Accelerator Programme entrant
- CO = College Accelerator Programme entrant
- NG = Next Gen Accelerator Program entrant
- w/o = Walkover
- r = Retired
- d = Defaulted

=== Draw ===
First round
M Cederschiöld (SWE) | 0 | 1
M Parton (GBR) | 6 | 6
S Fick (SWE)
E Magnusson (SWE) | w/o

Quarterfinals
E Arnheim (SWE) | 5 | 1
E Hannam (GBR) | 7 | 6
M Decugis (FRA) | w/o
M Parton (GBR)
S Fick (SWE) | 6 | 6
A Holmström (SWE) | 1 | 1
S Castenschiold (DEN) | 2 | 6 | 6
H Aitchison (GBR) | 6 | 2 | 1

Semifinals
E Hannam (GBR) | 7 | 6
M Parton (GBR) | 5 | 2
S Fick (SWE) | 4 | 4
S Castenschiold (DEN) | 6 | 6

Final (gold-medal match)
E Hannam (GBR) | 6 | 6
S Castenschiold (DEN) | 4 | 3
Bronze-medal match
M Parton (GBR) | 6 | 6
S Fick (SWE) | 3 | 3
