= Tennis at the 1912 Summer Olympics – Men's indoor singles =

Tennis at the Olympics

Men's indoor singles tennis at the Games of the V Olympiad
- Dates: 5–12 May 1912
- Competitors: 25 from 6 nations

Medalists
1st place, gold medalist(s)		André Gobert	France
2nd place, silver medalist(s)		Charles Dixon	Great Britain
3rd place, bronze medalist(s)		Anthony Wilding	Australasia

Men's indoor singles
- Tennis at the 1912 Summer Olympics

Events
Outdoor
Singles	men	women
Doubles	men		mixed
Indoor
Singles	men	women
Doubles	men		mixed
- Summer Olympics

The indoor men's singles competition at the 1912 Summer Olympics was part of the tennis program for the games.

== Draw ==
Key

- Q = Qualifier
- WC = Wild card
- LL = Lucky loser
- Alt = Alternate
- ITF = ITF entry
- PR = Protected ranking
- SR = Special ranking
- SE = Special exempt
- JE = Junior exempt
- JR = Junior Accelerator Programme entrant
- CO = College Accelerator Programme entrant
- NG = Next Gen Accelerator Program entrant
- w/o = Walkover
- r = Retired
- d = Defaulted

=== Finals ===
Semifinals
Charles Dixon (GBR)	6	4	6	6
Anthony Wilding (ANZ)	0	6	4	4
André Gobert (FRA)	6	10	2	2	6
Gordon Lowe (GBR)	4	8	6	6	2

Final (gold-medal match)
Charles Dixon (GBR)	6	4	4
André Gobert (FRA)	8	6	6
Bronze-medal match
Anthony Wilding (ANZ)	4	6	7	6
Gordon Lowe (GBR)	6	2	5	0

=== Top half ===
First round
M Decugis (FRA)	w/o
J Just (BOH)
T Grönfors (SWE)
J Šebek (BOH)	w/o
L Silfverstolpe (SWE)	0	1	1
A Wilding (ANZ)	6	6	6
F Möller (SWE)	2	5	7	4
G Caridia (GBR)	6	7	5	6
A Gore (GBR)	7	6	7
H Leffler (SWE)	5	4	5

Second round
C Dixon (GBR)	6	9	4	10
T Mavrogordato (GBR)	2	7	6	8
K Robětín (BOH)
J Just (BOH)	w/o
T Grönfors (SWE)	3	3	3
A Wilding (ANZ)	6	6	6
G Caridia (GBR)	6	9	7
A Gore (GBR)	2	7	5

Quarterfinals
C Dixon (GBR)	6	6	6
K Robětín (BOH)	2	4	1
A Wilding (ANZ)	6	6	6
G Caridia (GBR)	3	1	2

Semifinals
C Dixon (GBR)	6	4	6	6
A Wilding (ANZ)	0	6	4	4

=== Bottom half ===
First round
W Boström (SWE)	7	4	4	4
A Lowe (GBR)	5	6	6	6
M Germot (FRA)	4	6	4	6	6
A Beamish (GBR)	6	2	6	2	4
E Larsen (DEN)	6	1	7	6
A Gobert (FRA)	8	6	5	8
J Hainz (BOH)	1	4	6	3
C Kempe (SWE)	6	6	3	6

Second round
A Lowe (GBR)	6	3	6	6
M Germot (FRA)	4	6	1	4
A Gobert (FRA)	6	6	7
C Kempe (SWE)	1	2	5
HR Barrett (GBR)	6	1	4	8	4
C Setterwall (SWE)	4	6	6	6	6
G Lowe (GBR)	6	6	6
C Wennergren (SWE)	4	1	4

Quarterfinals
A Lowe (GBR)	1	1	3
A Gobert (FRA)	6	6	6
C Setterwall (SWE)	4	6	3	6
G Lowe (GBR)	6	1	6	8

Semifinals
A Gobert (FRA)	6	10	2	2	6
G Lowe (GBR)	4	8	6	6	2
