= Grönfors =

Grönfors is a Swedish surname. Notable people with the surname include:

- Gustaf Grönfors (1861–1930), Swedish newspaper economist
- Kurt Grönfors (1922–2005), Swedish legal scholar
- Martti Grönfors (1942–2019), Finnish sociologist
- Torsten Grönfors (1888–1968), Swedish sailor and tennis player
