= Löwenadler =

Löwenadler is a Swedish surname. Notable people with the surname include:

- Fredrik Löwenadler (1895–1967), Swedish swimmer
- Holger Löwenadler (1904–1977), Swedish film actor
