= Erik Larsen (tennis) =

Danish tennis player

- Full name: Erik Øckenholt Larsen
- Country (sports): Denmark
- Born: 23 August 1880 Copenhagen, Denmark
- Died: 1964 Worthing, England
- Turned pro: 1902 (amateur)
- Retired: 1914

Singles

Grand Slam singles results
- Wimbledon: 4R (1913)

Other tournaments
- Olympic Games: 1R (1912^{In})

Doubles

Grand Slam doubles results
- Wimbledon: 1R (1905)

Erik Øckenholt Larsen (born 23 August 1880 - 1964) was a Danish tennis player at the beginning of the 20th century.

== Career ==
Larsen was one of the first players from Denmark – the other being Thorkil Hillerup – to compete at the Wimbledon Championships in singles in 1905. He lost his first round match against William Larned. In 1913, he reached the fourth round which remained his best result at the tournament. That same year he reached the final of the British Covered Court Championships which he lost in four sets to Percival Davson.

Larson won the title at the Danish National Championships seven times in 1899, 1900, 1903 and from 1905 to 1908.

His other career singles highlights include winning the Hanover International two times in 1907 and 1908, he also won the Pöseldorf Prize event in Hamburg in 1899.

In 1907 he was a finalist at the German International Championships losing to Otto Froitzheim, in 1910 he reached the finals of the West Sussex Challenge Cup where he was beaten by Major Ritchie.

In addition, he competed in the singles and mixed doubles competition (with Sofie Castenschiold) at the 1912 Summer Olympics, but couldn't win any medal.
