= Ebba Hay =

Swedish tennis player

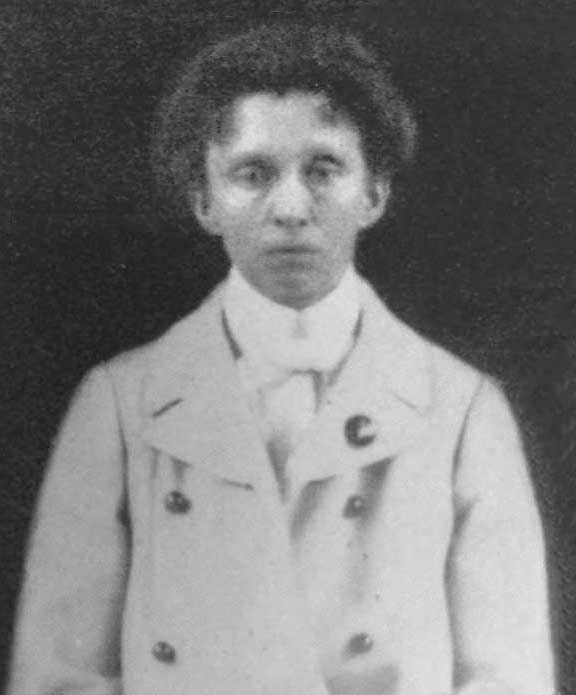
- Born: 11 December 1866; Jönköping, Sweden
- Died: 26 May 1954 (aged 87); Jönköping, Sweden

Ebba Hay (11 December 1866 – 26 May 1954) was a Swedish tennis player who competed in the 1912 Summer Olympics. She and her partner Frans Möller were eliminated in the first round of the indoor mixed doubles.
