= August Gustafsson =

Swedish tug of war competitor

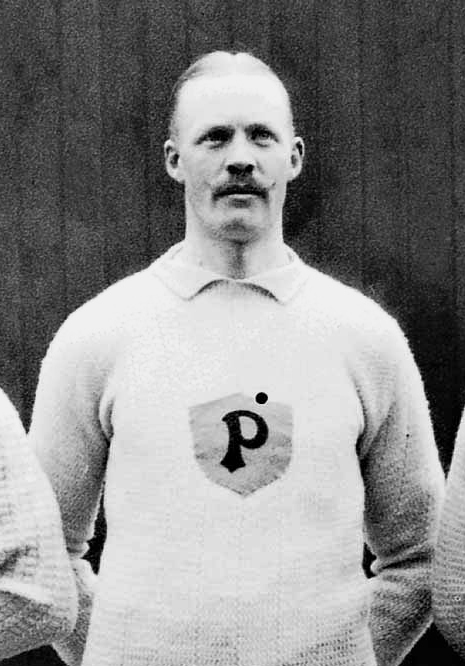
- Gustafsson at the 1912 Olympics

Personal information
- Born: 4 November 1875 Tibro, Sweden
- Died: 31 October 1938 (aged 62) Gothenburg, Sweden

Sport
- Sport: Tug of war
- Club: Stockholmspolisens IF
Medal record
Representing Sweden
Olympic Games
Gold medal – first place	1912 Stockholm	Team competition

Per August Gustafsson (4 November 1875 – 31 October 1938) was a Swedish policeman who won a gold medal in the tug of war competition at the 1912 Summer Olympics.
