= Heinrich Schomburgk =

German tennis player and footballer

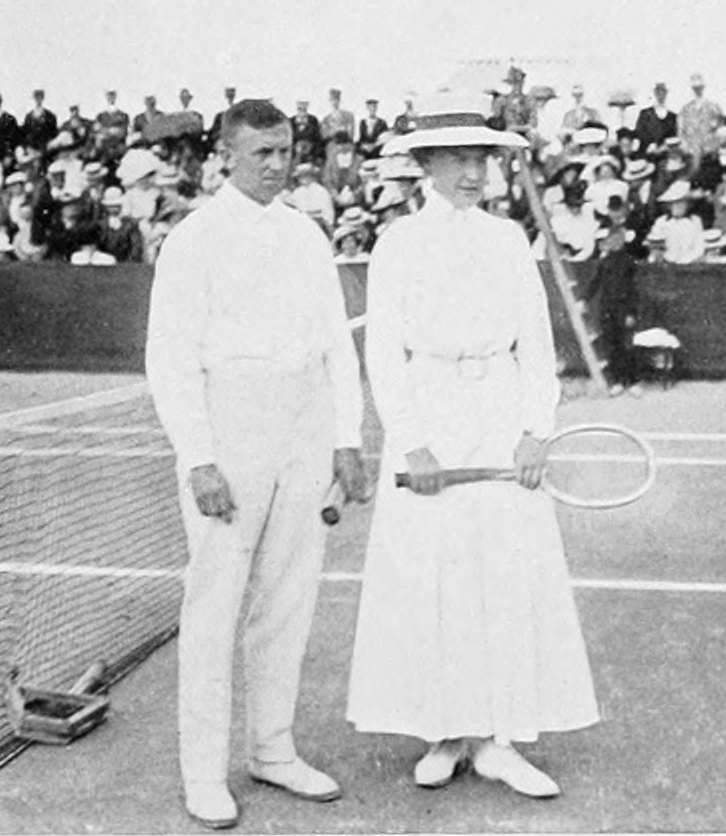
- Schomburgk in 1912
- Full name: Heinrich Georg Schomburgk
- Country (sports): Germany
- Born: 23 June 1885 Leipzig, German Empire
- Died: 26 March 1965 (aged 79) Königstein, East Germany

Grand Slam singles results
- Wimbledon: 3R (1906)

Other tournaments
- Olympic Games: 2R (1908)

Grand Slam doubles results
- Wimbledon: 2R (1906)

Other mixed doubles tournaments
- Olympic Games: W (1912)
Medal record
Representing Germany
Tennis, Summer Olympics
Gold medal – first place	1912 Stockholm	Outdoor Mixed Doubles

Heinrich Georg Schomburgk (German pronunciation: [ˈhaɪnʁɪç ˈʃoːmbʊʁk]; 23 June 1885 – 26 March 1965) was a male tennis player and footballer from Germany.

At the Stockholm Olympics in 1912, he won a gold medal in the mixed doubles event with Dorothea Köring.

He participated in the 1906 Wimbledon Championships, reaching the second round, where he was beaten by Frank Riseley, who later on was to challenge the defending champion Laurence Doherty.

Schomburgk won the singles title at the 1913 German Open Tennis Championships, defeating compatriot Otto von Müller in three straight sets.
