= Arvid Andersson (tug of war) =

Swedish tug of war competitor (1881–1956)

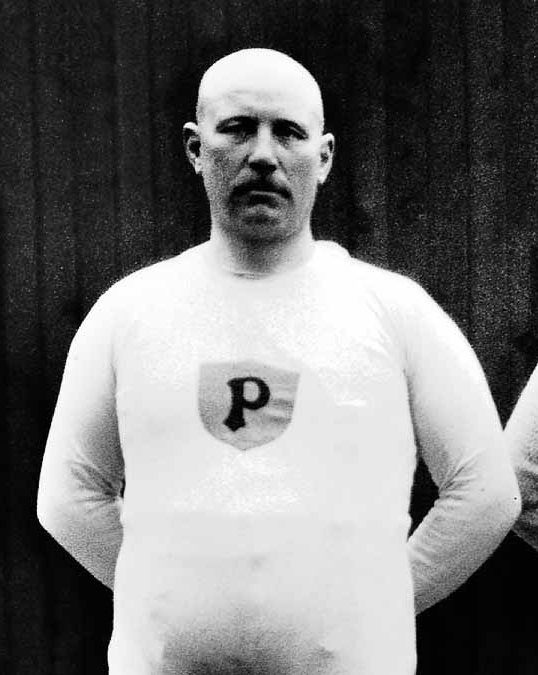
- Andersson at the 1912 Olympics

Personal information
- Born: 9 July 1881 Kila, Sweden
- Died: 7 August 1956 (aged 75) Stockholm, Sweden

Sport
- Sport: Tug of war
- Club: Stockholmspolisens IF
Medal record
Representing Sweden
Olympic Games
Gold medal – first place	1912 Stockholm	Team competition

Arvid Leander Andersson (9 July 1881 – 7 August 1956) was a Swedish policeman. He was the captain of the Swedish tug of war team that won the gold medal at the 1912 Summer Olympics.
