= Herbert Lindström =

Swedish tug of war competitor

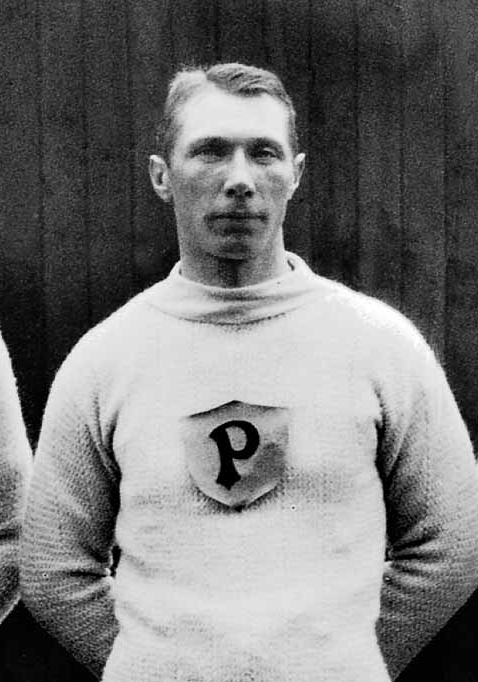
- Lindström at the 1912 Olympics

Personal information
- Born: 16 March 1886 Harö, Norrtälje, Stockholm, Sweden
- Died: 26 October 1951 (aged 64) Harö, Norrtälje, Stockholm, Sweden

Sport
- Sport: Tug of war
- Club: Stockholmspolisens IF
Medal record
Representing Sweden
Olympic Games
Gold medal – first place	1912 Stockholm	Team competition

Carl Herbert Lindström (16 March 1886 – 26 October 1951) was a Swedish fisherman who won a gold medal in the tug of war competition at the 1912 Summer Olympics.
