= Carl-Olof Nylén =

Swedish otologist and tennis player

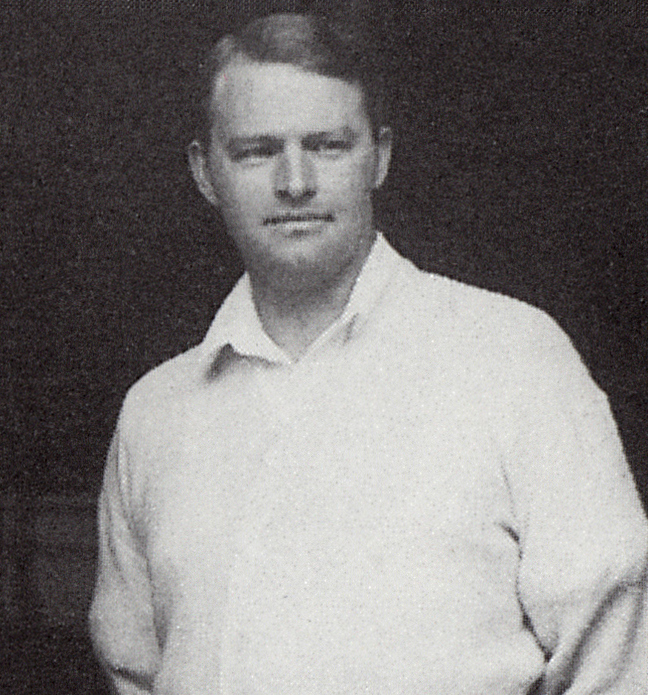
- Born: 30 June 1892; Uppsala, Sweden
- Died: 2 October 1978 (aged 86); Stocksund, Sweden

Carl-Olof "Olle" Siggesson Nylén (30 June 1892 – 2 October 1978) was a Swedish otologist and tennis player who competed in the 1912 Summer Olympics. He is also known in microsurgery as a first man who designed surgical microscope which was used in otolaryngology.

In 1912, he and his partner Charles Wennergren were eliminated in the quarter-finals of the outdoor doubles. They lost in the first round in the indoor doubles.

In the outdoor mixed doubles as well as in the indoor mixed doubles he and his partner Edith Arnheim lost in the first round.

Nylén was born to the military doctor Sixtus Nylen (1854–1911) and Anna Choler (1862–1929). In 1915–16, he won a few Swedish titles in singles and doubles, and in 1917, he was ranked as the best test player in Sweden.
