= Johan Edman =

Swedish policeman and tug of war competitor

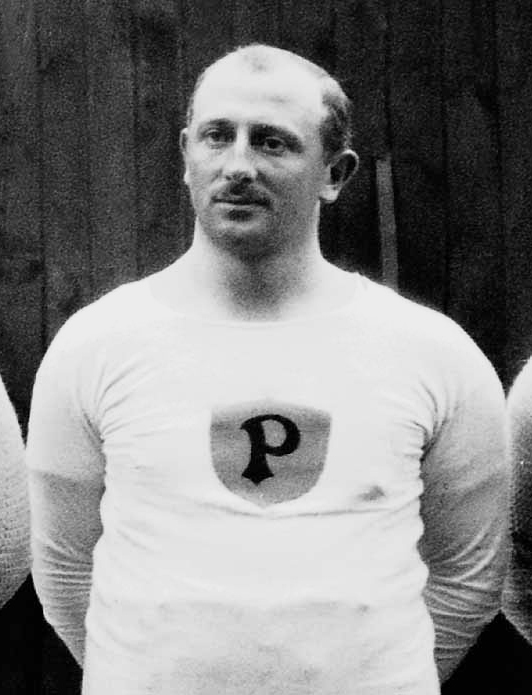
- Edman at the 1912 Olympics

Personal information
- Born: 29 March 1875 Långserud, Säffle, Sweden
- Died: 19 August 1927 (aged 52) Norra Ny, Torsby, Sweden

Sport
- Sport: Tug of war
- Club: Stockholmspolisens IF
Medal record
Representing Sweden
Olympic Games
Gold medal – first place	1912 Stockholm	Team competition

Johan Viktor Edman (29 March 1875 – 19 August 1927) was a Swedish policeman who won a gold medal in the tug of war competition at the 1912 Summer Olympics.
