= Erik Larsson (athlete) =

Swedish policeman and tug of war competitor

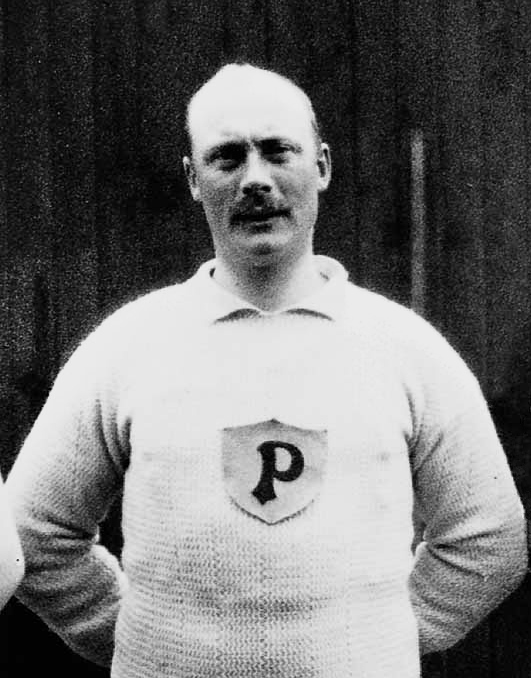
- Larsson at the 1912 Olympics

Personal information
- Born: Erik Victor Larsson; 14 May 1888 Axberg, Sweden
- Died: 23 August 1934 (aged 46) Stockholm, Sweden

Sport
- Sport: Tug of war
- Club: Stockholmspolisens IF
Medal record
Representing Sweden
Olympic Games
| Gold medal – first place | 1912 Stockholm | Team competition |

Erik Victor Larsson (14 May 1888 – 23 August 1934) was a Swedish policeman who won a gold medal in the tug of war competition at the 1912 Summer Olympics.
