= Ellen Brusewitz =

Swedish tennis player

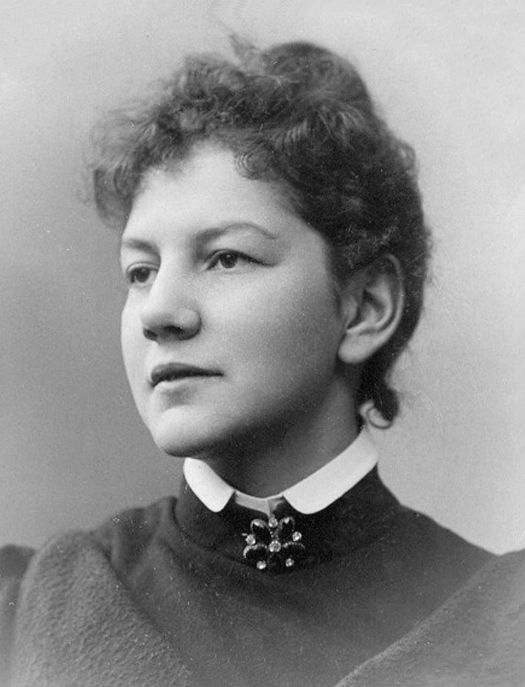
- Born: 10 November 1878; Jönköping, Sweden
- Died: 17 May 1952 (aged 73); Stockholm, Sweden

Ellen Maria Brusewitz (née Holmström, 10 November 1878 – 17 May 1952) was a Swedish tennis player. She competed in the women's outdoor singles event at the 1912 Summer Olympics and finished seventh, behind her younger sister Annie Holmström.
