= Kurt Grönfors =

Swedish legal scholar

Kurt G. W. Grönfors (25 March 1922 – 2005) was a Swedish legal scholar best known for his work within contract law, maritime law and transport law.

He was born in Stockholm as a son of Harry Grönfors and Hertha née Jakobsen. He finished the jur. kand. degree in 1947, followed by the juris doctor degree in 1952 with a thesis on liability in traffic accidents. He immediately became a docent at Stockholm University College, then teacher at the Stockholm School of Economics in 1958, before being appointed professor of jurisprudence at the Gothenburg School of Economics in 1959. Having served as rector of the Gothenburg School of Economics from 1962, he was a professor at the University of Gothenburg from 1971 to 1991, also serving as dean of the Faculty of Social Sciences from 1971 to 1977.

Grönfors received an honorary degree from Umeå University in 1980, was a fellow of the Royal Swedish Society of Science and Letters from 1965 and of the Norwegian Academy of Science and Letters from 1985. In Norway he chaired the Scandinavian Institute of Maritime Law from 1973 to 1993

He was also known for attracting "enormous donations" to the Gothenburg School of Economics, cooperating with the private sector. He died in 2005.
