= Torsten Grönfors =

Swedish Olympic tennis player and sailor

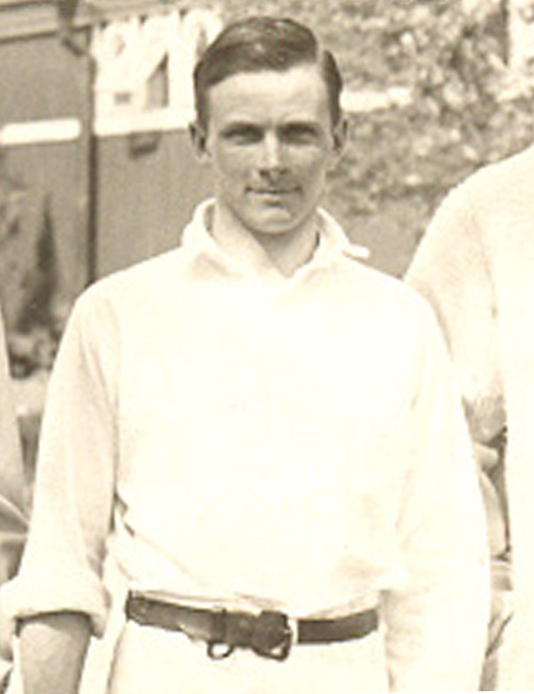
- Grönfors in 1910s

Personal information
- Full name: Torsten Gustav Magnus Henning Grönfors
- Born: 8 August 1888 Lund, Sweden
- Died: 28 May 1968 (aged 79) Stockholm, Sweden

Sport
- Sport: Tennis, sailing
- Club: Royal Swedish Yacht Club; KLTK, Stockholm

Torsten Gustav Magnus Henning Grönfors (8 August 1888 – 28 May 1968) was a Swedish sailor and tennis player who competed in the 1912 Summer Olympics.

He was a crew member of the Swedish boat R. S. Y. C., which finished fifth in the 8 metre class competition.

In the men's singles indoor tennis tournament, he was eliminated in the round of 16 by Anthony Wilding, who later won the bronze medal. In the outdoor singles tournament he was eliminated in the round of 32.

In the outdoor men's doubles event, he and his partner Frans Möller were eliminated in the first round. In the outdoor mixed doubles, he lost with his partner Annie Holmström in the quarter-finals.
