= Lennart Silfverstolpe =

Swedish tennis player

- Born: 27 June 1888; Enköping, Sweden
- Died: 4 August 1969 (aged 81); Stockholm, Sweden

Lennart Silfverstolpe (27 June 1888 – 4 August 1969) was a Swedish tennis player. He competed in the men's indoor singles event at the 1912 Summer Olympics.
