= Erik Algot Fredriksson =

Swedish tug of war competitor

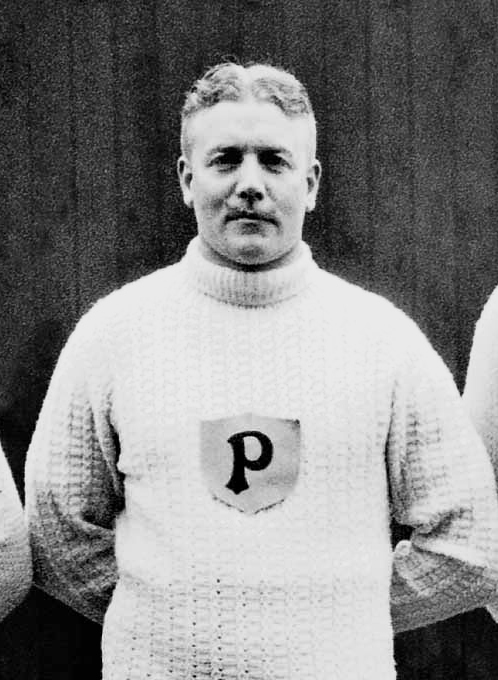
- Fredriksson at the 1912 Olympics

Personal information
- Born: 13 June 1885 Sköldinge, Sweden
- Died: 14 May 1930 (aged 44) Stockholm, Sweden

Sport
- Sport: Tug of war
- Club: Stockholmspolisens IF
Medal record
Representing Sweden
Olympic Games
Gold medal – first place	1912 Stockholm	Team competition

Erik Algot Fredriksson (13 June 1885 – 14 May 1930) a Swedish policeman who won a gold medal in the tug of war competition at the 1912 Summer Olympics. He also won a world title in this event in 1913. He was killed in a car accident in 1930.
