= Adolf Bergman =

Swedish policeman and tug of war competitor

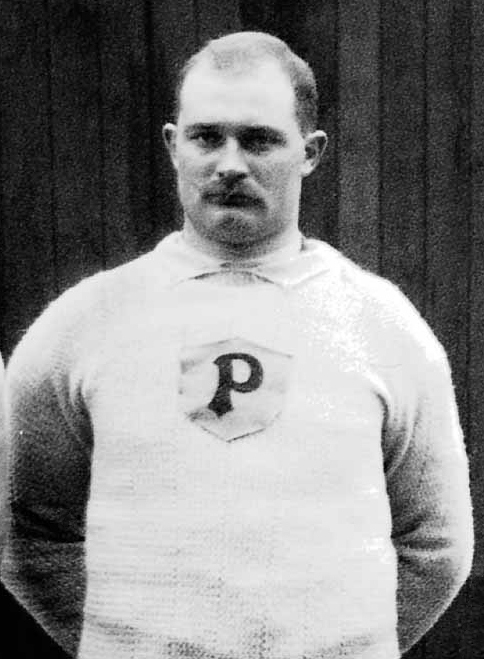
- Bergman at the 1912 Olympics

Personal information
- Born: 14 April 1879 Björnrike, Sweden
- Died: 14 May 1926 (aged 47) Gothenburg, Sweden

Sport
- Sport: Tug of war
- Club: Stockholmspolisens IF
Medal record
Representing Sweden
Olympic Games
Gold medal – first place	1912 Stockholm	Team competition

Adolf Bergman (14 April 1879 – 14 May 1926) was a Swedish policeman and tug of war competitor who won a gold medal at the 1912 Summer Olympics.
