= Gunnar Setterwall =

Swedish tennis player (1881–1928)

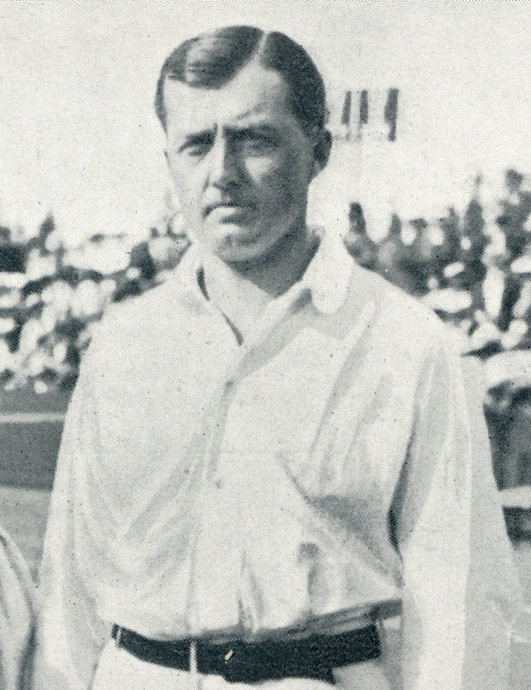
- Full name: Carl Gunnar Emanuel Setterwall
- Country (sports): Sweden
- Born: 18 August 1881; Stockholm, Sweden
- Died: 26 February 1928 (aged 46); Stockholm, Sweden

Singles

Other tournaments
- WCCC: SF (1913)
- Olympic Games: QF (1908^{In})

Doubles

Other doubles tournaments

Mixed doubles

Other mixed doubles tournaments
- WCCC: F (1913)
Medal record
Representing Sweden
Tennis
Olympic Games
Silver medal – second place	1912 Stockholm	Indoor doubles
Silver medal – second place	1912 Stockholm	Mixed doubles
Bronze medal – third place	1908 London	Indoor doubles
Bronze medal – third place	1912 Stockholm	Indoor mixed doubles

Carl Gunnar Emanuel Setterwall (18 August 1881 – 26 February 1928) was a Swedish tennis player who won four Olympic medals. In 1908, he won a bronze in the men's indoor doubles, with Wollmar Boström. Four years later, he won three more medals. In the mixed doubles (with Sigrid Fick) and indoor doubles (with Carl Kempe) tournaments, he reached the final but lost both times. Sigrid Fick was also his partner in the mixed indoor event, and they won a bronze medal together.

Setterwall's father, also named Carl, was a multimillionaire controlling much of the iron works during the development of railways in Scandinavia. His son followed in his footsteps, eventually taking over the family firm.
