= Margareta Cederschiöld =

Swedish tennis player

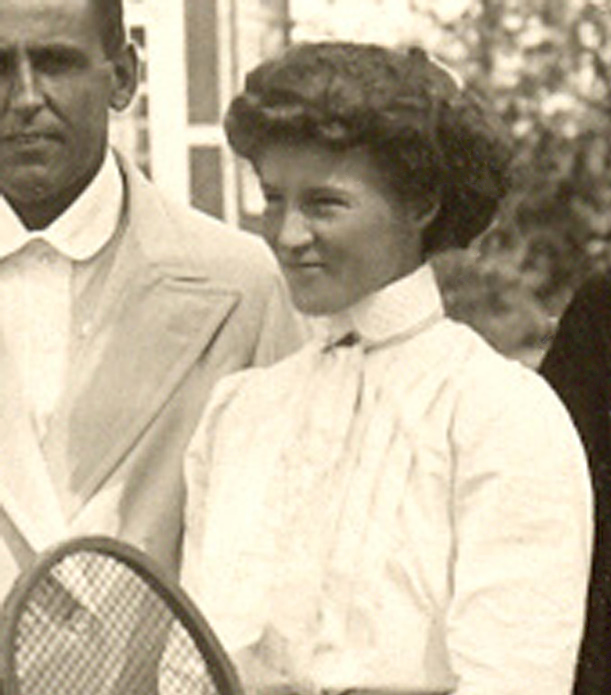

Personal information
- Born: 30 December 1879 Stockholm, Sweden
- Died: 29 July 1962 (aged 82) Stockholm, Sweden

Sport
- Sport: Tennis
- Club: KLTK, Stockholm

Margareta Cordelia Cederschiöld (30 December 1879 – 29 July 1962) was a Swedish tennis player who competed in the 1912 Summer Olympics. She was eliminated in the quarter-finals of the outdoor singles. She lost in the first round in the indoor singles. In the indoor mixed doubles, she and her partner Carl Kempe finished fourth without competing in the bronze medal match.

Her brother Hugo was an Olympic shooter.
