= Jaroslav Hainz =

Czech tennis player

- Born: 17 September 1883 Prague, Austria-Hungary

Jaroslav Hainz (17 September 1883 – between 1914 and 1918) was a Czech tennis player. He competed for Bohemia in the men's indoor singles event at the 1912 Summer Olympics. He died during World War I.

== See also ==
- List of Olympians killed in World War I
