= Fredrik Löwenadler =

Swedish swimmer

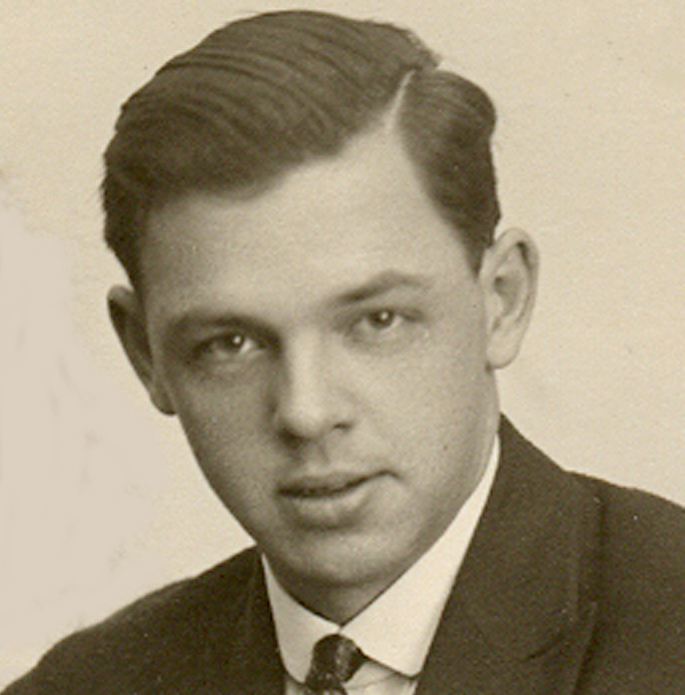

Personal information
- Born: 12 September 1895 Gothenburg, Sweden
- Died: 3 September 1967 (aged 71) Göteborg, Sweden

Sport
- Sport: Swimming
- Strokes: Breaststroke
- Club: Simklubben Göteborg

Fredrik Wilhelm Löwenadler (12 September 1895 – 3 September 1967) was a Swedish swimmer. He competed at the 1912 Summer Olympics in the 200 m breaststroke event, but failed to reach the final.
