= Edith Arnheim =

Swedish tennis player (1884–1964)

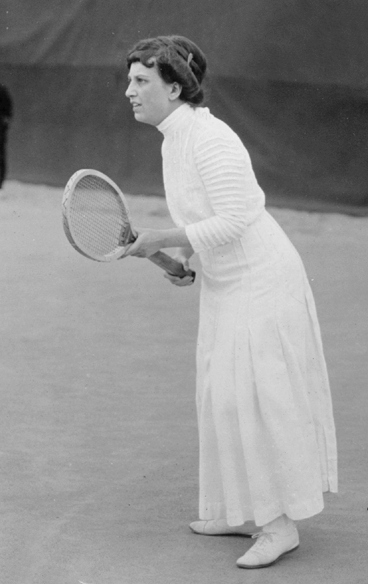
- Born: 21 February 1884; Prague, Czechoslovakia
- Died: 16 October 1964 (aged 80); Stockholm, Sweden

Edith Arnheim (née Lasch, 21 February 1884 – 16 October 1964) was a Swedish tennis player who competed in the 1912 Summer Olympics.

She lost the bronze medal match to Molla Bjurstedt in the outdoor singles. In the indoor singles, she was eliminated in the quarterfinals. In the outdoor mixed doubles, as well as in the indoor mixed doubles, she and her partner Carl-Olof Nylén lost in the first round.
