= Östermalms IP =

Sportsground in Östermalm in Stockholm, Sweden

Coordinates: 59°20′50″N 18°05′01″E

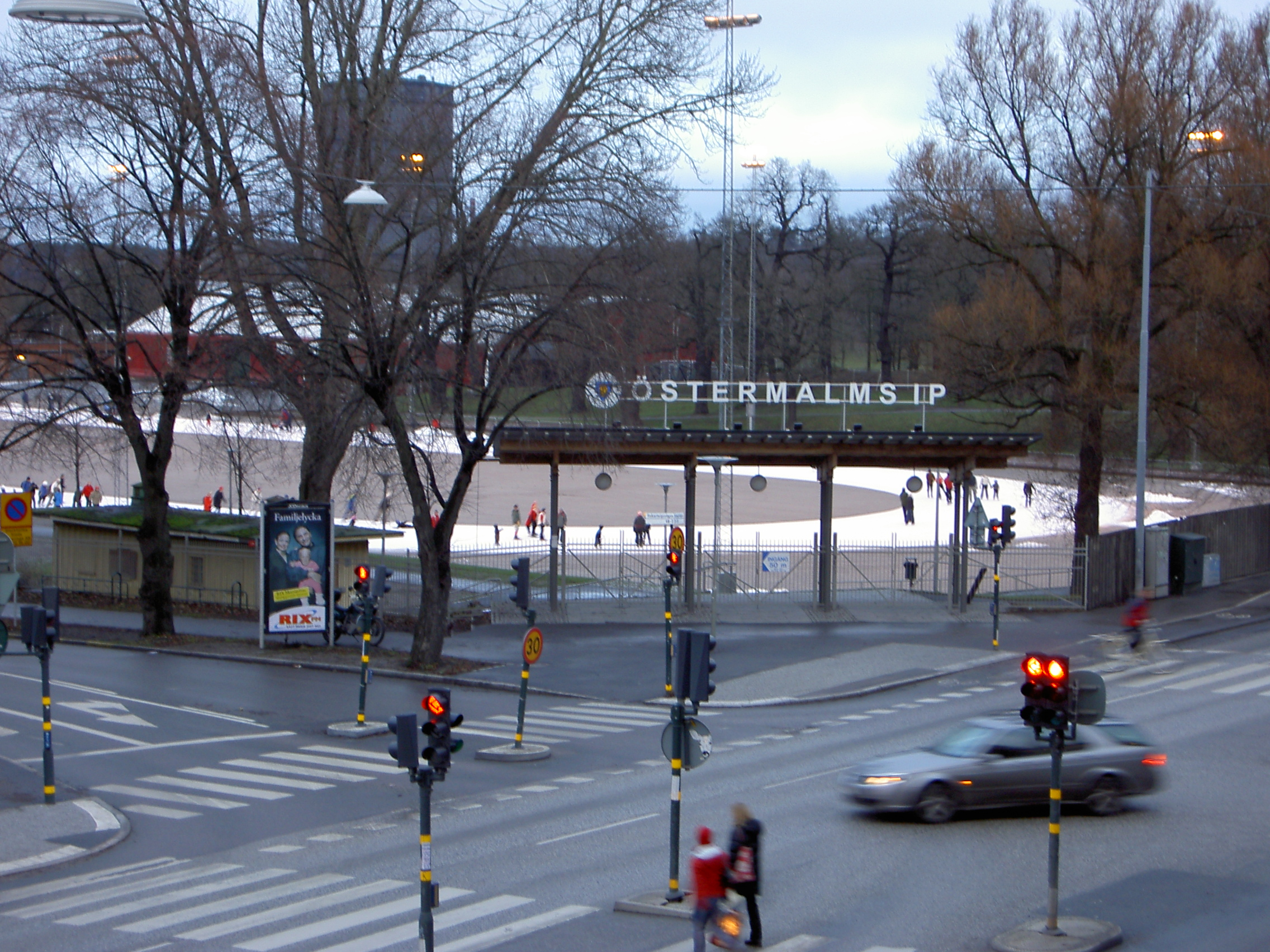
- Östermalms IP in early-January 2007
- Interactive map of Östermalms IP
- Location: Stockholm, Sweden
- Type: sports ground

Construction
- Opened: 30 September 1906

Östermalms IP is a sports ground located in the Östermalm district of Stockholm, Sweden. Completed in 1906, the facility played host to several sports during the 1912 Summer Olympics. These sports included equestrian, fencing (including the part for the modern pentathlon), and tennis. It also hosted the exhibition for baseball at those same games. Current tenants are the bandy department of Djurgårdens IF, the youth program of the said club's football department and several lower league teams. The athletic grounds also hosts a speed skating rink during winter.

The ice hockey rink was completed for the 1926–1927 season.
