= Dorothea Köring =

German tennis player (1880–1945)

Dora Köring
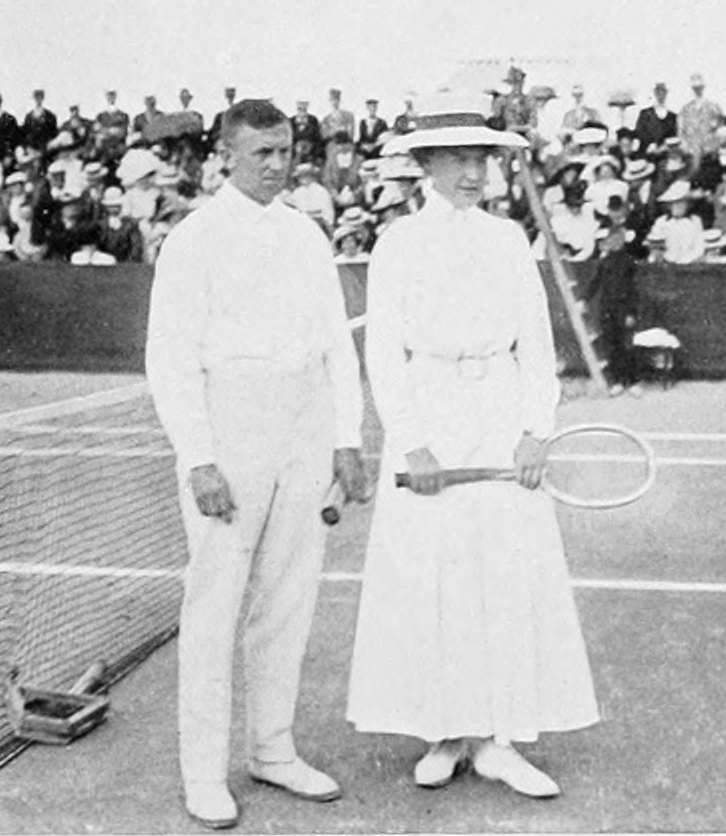
- Dorothea Köring and Heinrich Schomburgk at the 1912 Summer Olympics
- Full name: Dorothea Köring
- Country (sports): Germany
- Born: 11 July 1880; Chemnitz, German Empire
- Died: 13 February 1945 (aged 64); Dresden, Nazi Germany

Singles
- Olympic Games: Silver Medal (1912)

Other mixed doubles tournaments
- Olympic Games: Gold Medal (1912)

Olympic medal record

Women's tennis
Gold medal – first place	1912 Stockholm	Mixed doubles
Silver medal – second place	1912 Stockholm	Singles

Dorothea "Dora" Köring (German pronunciation: [doʁoˈteːa ˈkøːʁɪŋ]; 11 July 1880 – 13 February 1945) was a female tennis player from Germany.

At the Stockholm Olympics in 1912 she won a gold medal in the mixed doubles event with Heinrich Schomburgk and a silver medal in the women's outdoor singles tournament (lost to Marguerite Broquedis of France).

Köring died in her house in Dresden during the bombing of Dresden in World War II.
