= Sofie Castenschiold =

Danish tennis player

- Full name: Thora Gerda Sofie Castenschiold
- Country (sports): Denmark
- Born: 1 February 1882; Copenhagen, Denmark
- Died: 30 January 1979 (aged 96); Helsingborg, Sweden
Medal record
Representing Denmark
Women's Tennis
Olympic Games
Silver medal – second place	1912 Stockholm	Indoor singles

Thora Gerda Sofie Castenschiold (1 February 1882 – 30 January 1979) was a Danish tennis player at the beginning of the 20th century. She was the first woman to represent Denmark at the Olympics.

== Career ==
Castenschiold, a member of Copenhagen's KB, won the title at the first Danish women's tennis championships in 1906. She could defend it four times in a row until 1910.

She took part in the 1912 Summer Olympics at Stockholm and won the silver medal in the indoor singles competition.
