= Annie Holmström =

Swedish tennis player

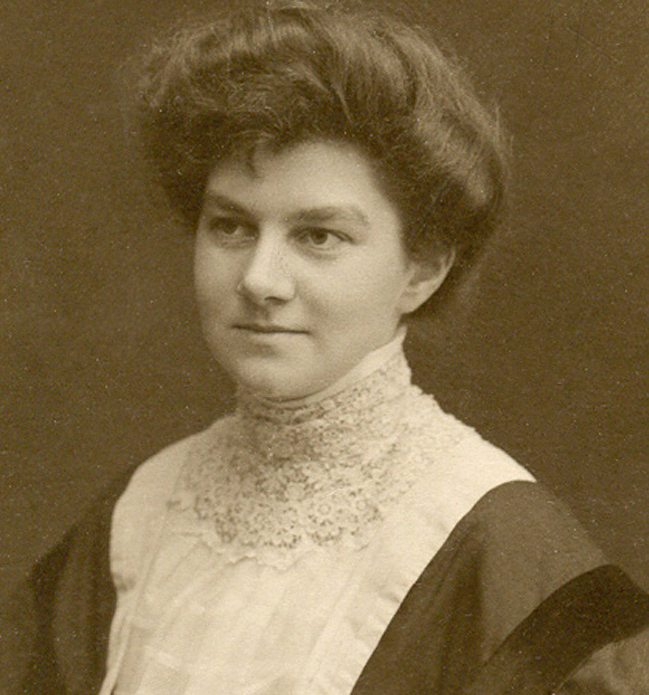
- Born: 22 February 1880 Jönköping, Sweden
- Died: 26 October 1953 (aged 73) Jönköping, Sweden

Annie Sofia Holmström (22 February 1880 – 26 October 1953) was a Swedish tennis player. She competed in singles and mixed doubles at the 1912 Summer Olympics and finished in fourth-fifth place. Her elder sister Ellen Brusewitz competed in singles at the same Olympics.

She competed in three of the four competitions. In the mixed grass event, she won the opening match against the Norwegian Duo Molla Mallory and Conrad Langaard but then lost to the Swedes Sigrid Fick and Gunnar Setterwall. Because of the many retreats, she was awarded fourth place. Holmström lost her first Match in each of the two singles matches. In 1911 and 1913, she reached the final of the Swedish Indoor Championships.
