= Sigrid Fick =

Swedish tennis player

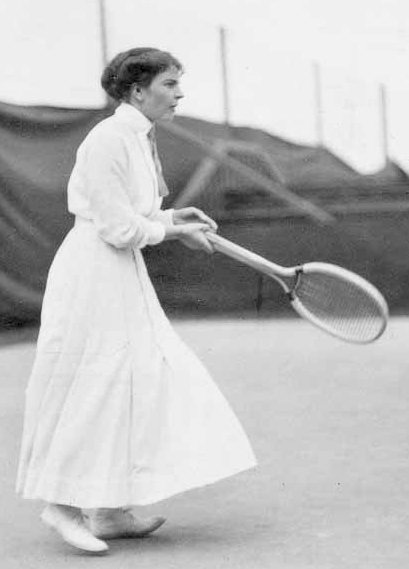
- Fick at the 1912 Olympics
- Country (sports): Sweden
- Born: 28 March 1887; Helsinki, Uusimaa Province, Grand Duchy of Finland
- Died: 4 June 1979 (aged 92); Stockholm, Sweden
- Plays: Right-handed
Medal record
Representing Sweden
Olympic Games
Silver medal – second place	1912 Stockholm	Mixed doubles
Bronze medal – third place	1912 Stockholm	Indoor mixed doubles

Sigrid Fick (née Frenckell; 28 March 1887 – 4 June 1979) was a Finnish-born tennis player who moved to Sweden in 1910. She competed at the 1912, 1920 and 1924 Olympics. She won two mixed doubles medals in 1912, both with Gunnar Setterwall. During her career Fick won 56 Swedish titles.
