= Frans Möller (tennis) =

Swedish tennis player

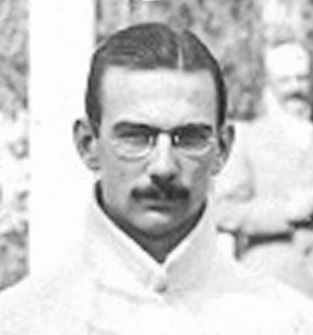
- Born: 19 May 1886; Stockholm, Sweden
- Died: 10 October 1954 (aged 68); Stockholm, Sweden

Frans Julius Möller (19 May 1886 – 10 October 1954) was a Swedish tennis player who competed in the 1912 Summer Olympics. He was eliminated in the second round of the outdoor singles, and lost in the first round of the indoor singles, outdoor doubles and indoor mixed doubles.
