= Carl Kempe =

Swedish tennis player and businessman

Johan Carl Kempe
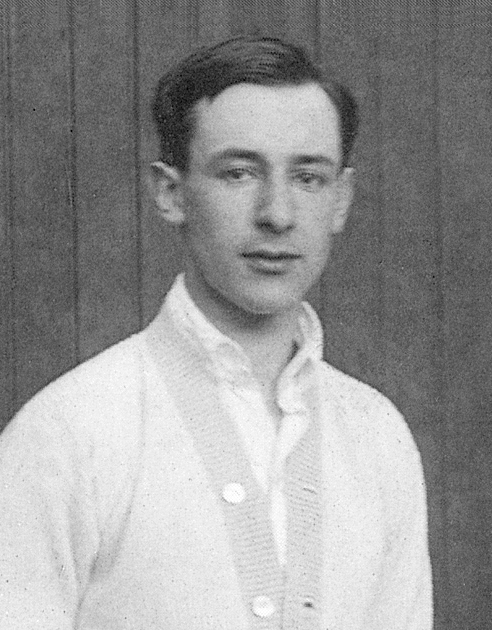
- Kempe at the 1912 Olympics
- Born: 8 December 1884; Stockholm, Sweden
- Died: 8 July 1967 (aged 82); Enköping, Sweden
Medal record
Representing Sweden
Men's Tennis
Olympic Games
Silver medal – second place	1912 Stockholm	Indoor doubles

Johan Carl Kempe (8 December 1884 – 8 July 1967) was the leader of the Swedish pulp and paper industry Mo och Domsjö AB (now Holmen Group) and was involved in several other companies in the large economic sphere of the Kempe family. He was also a silver medalist in tennis at the 1912 Summer Olympics in Stockholm.

== Biography ==
Carl Kempe was born at Jakobs församling in Stockholm, Sweden. He was the son of industrialist Frans Kempe (1847-1924) and Eva Charlotta Kempe ( Treffenberg). He finished secondary school at Norra Latin in Stockholm, studied at Uppsala University 1903–1905 and started to work for Mo och Domsjö in 1906. His father had been employed by the family company since 1875, became its managing director in 1884 and chairman of the board in 1908. During this period, the company expanded sharply and acquired other operations with sawmills and forest land. In 1903, the first pulp factory Mo och Domsjö opened in at Domsjö in Örnsköldsvik. During the first decades of the 20th century, pulp mills were established in Hörnefors and Husum.

Carl Kempe studied abroad and followed his father on business trips to foreign countries. He succeeded his father as CEO of Mo och Domsjö in 1917. The company he took over from his father had retained many traits of a traditional lumber producer. During the 1920s, technical advances in the wood industry had begun and were carried out on a large scale. Chemical laboratories were established and extensive wood research was initiated. Through large investments in research and development, Carl Kempe was chiefly responsible for its transformation into a modern chemical industry.

Kempe himself claimed that he spent his time at university in Uppsala mostly playing tennis, attending dancing lessons and playing cards; the first of these pastimes, at least, led to his winning a tennis silver medal at the 1912 Summer Olympics in Stockholm in the men's indoor doubles event together with Gunnar Setterwall (1881-1928).

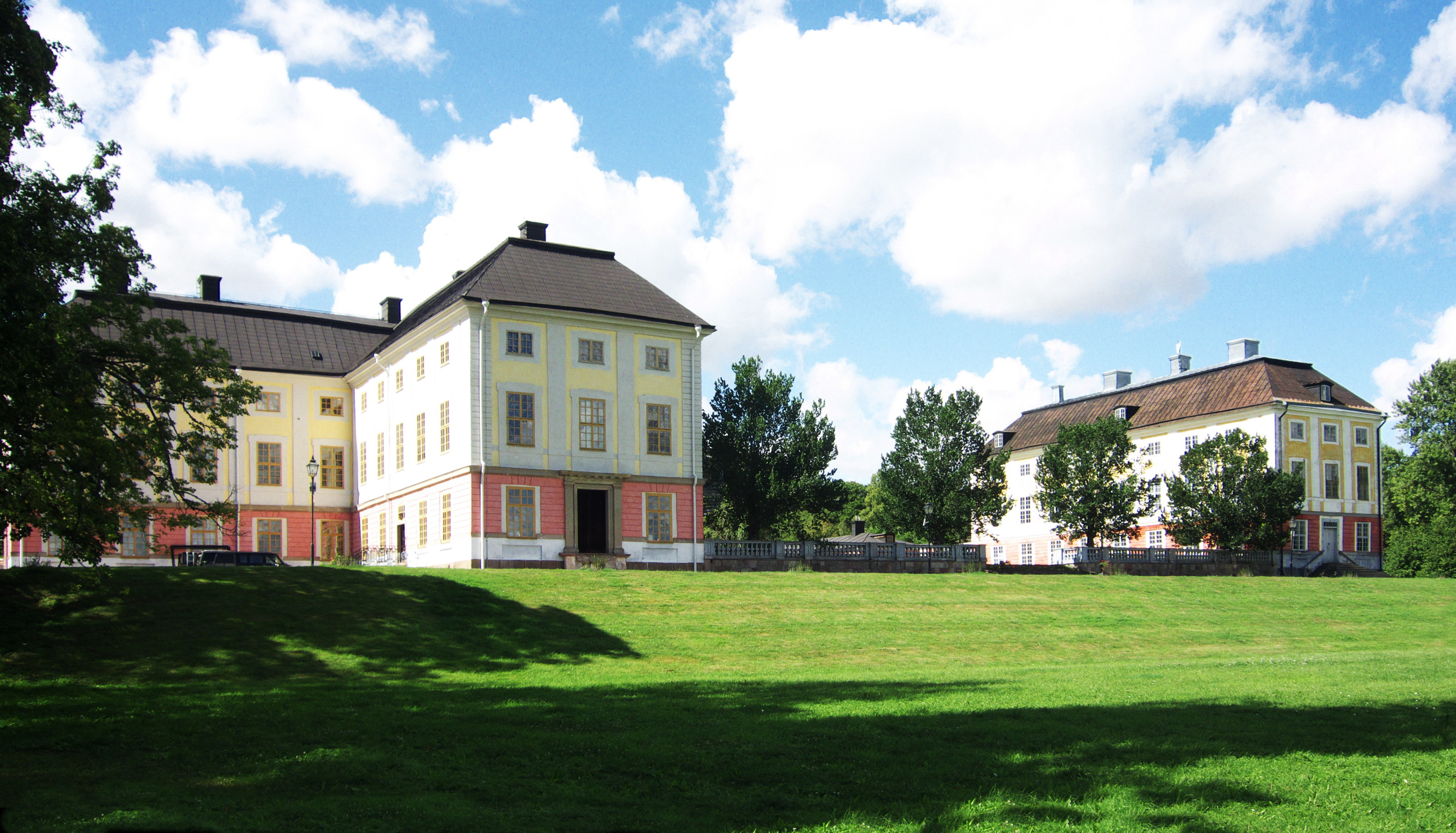
Ekolsund Manor

In 1917, Carl Kempe bought Ekolsund Manor at Enköping Municipality in Uppsala County. During the period 1928–1930, he had the southern lane restored and modernized according to drawings by actor, art director and architect Vilhelm Bryde (1888-1974). The estate was used as a residence for his family. He had shown an interest in Chinese art since the 1920s and filled the manor house with Chinese artifacts. Shortly before his death in 1967, Kempe left Ekolsund to the daughters of his second marriage.

== Personal life ==
Carl Kempe married Helfrid Ingeborg Margareta Hammarberg (1885-1975) in 1919. He was married in 1934 to Aagot Marianne Axell. He was the father of five children in his first marriage and two in the second. He died in 1967 at Enköping in Uppsala County.

== See also ==
- Holmen (company)

== Bibliography ==
- Gunnar Unger, "Kempe, Johan Carl", Svenskt biografiskt lexikon, Vol. 21 (1975–1977), pp. 58–60External links
- Holmen Group website
