= Diving at the 1908 Summer Olympics – Men's 10 metre platform =

Men's platform diving at the Games of the IV Olympiad
- Venue: White City Stadium
- Dates: 20–24 July
- Competitors: 24 from 6 nations

Medalists
1st place, gold medalist(s)		Hjalmar Johansson	Sweden
2nd place, silver medalist(s)		Karl Malmström	Sweden
3rd place, bronze medalist(s)		Arvid Spångberg	Sweden

Official 1908 Highlight Film 10m Platform @ 1:12

The men's 10 metre platform, also known as the high diving competition, was one of two diving events on the diving at the 1908 Summer Olympics programme, along with the men's 3 metre springboard. The competition was held from Monday 20 to Friday 24 July 1908. Twenty-four divers from six nations competed. Each nation could enter up to 12 divers.

== Competition format ==
The competition was actually held from both 10 metre and 5 metre platforms. Divers performed a running plain dive and a backward somersault from the 5 metre platform, a running plain dive and a standing plain dive from the 10 metre platform, and three dives of the competitor's choice from the 10 metre platform. The voluntary dives were selected from a list of 14 options.

Each judge gave a score between 0 and 10 points, in increments of half a point, for each dive. The scores for the voluntary dives were multiplied by the degree of difficulty (difficulty ranged from 1.2 to 2.1 per dive). No degree of difficulty multiplier was used for the compulsory dives. The dive scores from each judge were summed and divided by 3, with the three judges' results added to give a final score. However, the final scores were not technically determinative (except as tie-breakers); after the scores were calculated, each judge ranked the competitors (and could choose to follow the scores or not) and the competition was decided on a point-for-place system with the competitor with the lowest total ranking from the three judges winning. Final scores were used as tie-breakers if this aggregate ranking was tied. In no case was the point-for-place result different for any round from the final scores, however; the Official Report contains only the final scores and not the ordinal rankings from the judges. Indeed, it appears that "the ordinal scores are not recorded in any source" and "the individual judges' scores are not known, so it is not possible to reconstruct the ordinal placements."

The competition was held over three rounds (first round, semifinals, and final). The first round consisted of 5 groups of between 4 and 6 divers each; the top 2 divers in each group advanced to the semifinals. The semifinals consisted of 2 groups of 5 divers each. The top 2 divers in each group advanced to the final. The final featured 5 divers (due to a successful protest leading to an additional diver advancing).

== Results ==
=== First round ===
The two divers who scored the greatest number of points in each group of the first round advanced to the semifinals.

==== Group 1 ====
Rank	Diver	Nation	Score	Notes
1	George Gaidzik	United States	81.8	Q
2	Harold Goodworth	Great Britain	76.0	Q
3	Erik Adlerz	Sweden	74.1	
4	Oskar Wetzell	Finland	69.7	
5	James Aldous	Great Britain	68.0	

==== Group 2 ====
Rank	Diver	Nation	Score	Notes
1	Hjalmar Johansson	Sweden	78.4	Q
2	Karl Malmström	Sweden	73.95	Q
3	William Hoare	Great Britain	65.2	
4	Jérome Hicketick	Belgium	DNF	

==== Group 3 ====
Rank	Diver	Nation	Score	Notes
1	Hilmer Löfberg	Sweden	68.9	Q
2	Heinz Freyschmidt	Germany	67.3	Q
3	Sigfrid Larsson	Sweden	64.8	
4	William Webb	Great Britain	57.7	
5	Frank Collings	Great Britain	56.5	

==== Group 4 ====
Cane landed poorly in one of his dives, passing out in the water. Hjalmar Johansson, who had won group 2 and would eventually take the gold medal, rescued him. Cane "was quickly revived and sustained no major injuries", but "was so seriously shaken as to be unable to leave his bed for some days." This incident led to calls to ban double somersaults. Double somersaults do not appear to have been permitted again until 1928.

Rank	Diver	Nation	Score	Notes
1	Arvid Spångberg	Sweden	79.2	Q
2	Harald Arbin	Sweden	76.8	Q
3	George Cane	Great Britain	73.1	
4	Gunnar Wingqvist	Sweden	65.70	

==== Group 5 ====
Rank	Diver	Nation	Score	Notes
1	Robert Andersson	Sweden	73.55	Q
2	Toivo Aro	Finland	69.5	Q
3	Harold Grote	United States	62.8	
4	Axel Runström	Sweden	57.6	
5	Fritz Nicolai	Germany	54.5	
6	Thomas Harrington	Great Britain	53.15	

=== Semifinals ===
The two divers from each semifinal with the highest scores advanced to the final. Following a protest, a third diver from the second semifinal, George Gaidzik, was also included in the final. One of the judges had given Gaidzik dive scores of 0, asserting that Gaidzik was receiving coaching from a teammate signaling from the ground; the American team protested successfully, resulting in Gaidzik advancing along with the two top divers.

==== Semifinal 1 ====
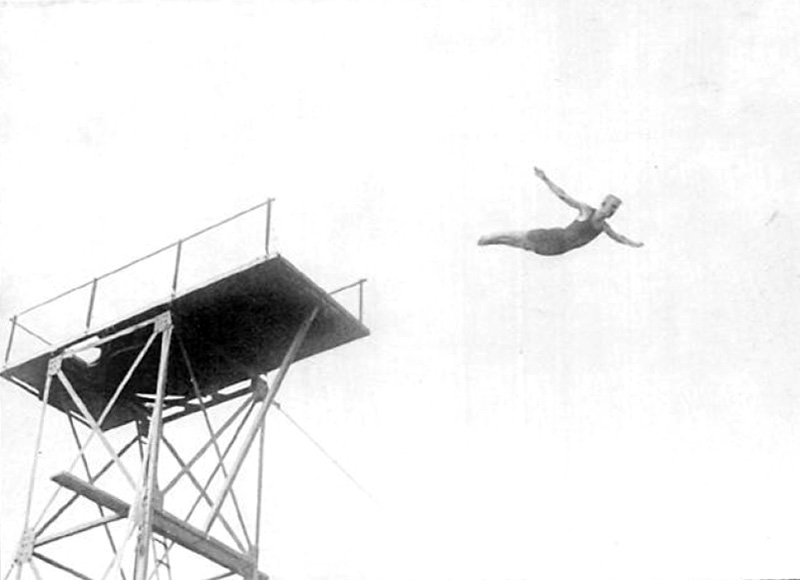
Arvid Spångberg winning the bronze medal.

Rank	Diver	Nation	Score	Notes
1	Arvid Spångberg	Sweden	72.3	Q
2	Karl Malmström	Sweden	67.0	Q
3	Toivo Aro	Finland	62.7	
4	Hilmer Löfberg	Sweden	59.18	
5	Harald Arbin	Sweden	52.81	

==== Semifinal 2 ====
Rank	Diver	Nation	Score	Notes
1	Hjalmar Johansson	Sweden	80.75	Q
2	Robert Andersson	Sweden	66.75	Q
3	George Gaidzik	United States	61.0	Q
4	Harold Goodworth	Great Britain	59.48	
5	Heinz Freyschmidt	Germany	48.8	

=== Final ===
Rank	Diver	Nation	Score
1st place, gold medalist(s)	Hjalmar Johansson	Sweden	83.75
2nd place, silver medalist(s)	Karl Malmström	Sweden	78.73
3rd place, bronze medalist(s)	Arvid Spångberg	Sweden	74.00
4	Robert Andersson	Sweden	68.30
5	George Gaidzik	United States	56.30

== Sources ==
- Cook, Theodore Andrea (1908). The Fourth Olympiad, Being the Official Report. London: British Olympic Association.
- De Wael, Herman (2001). "Diving 1908". Herman's Full Olympians. Archived from the original on 4 June 2011.
