= Germany at the 1906 Intercalated Games =

Germany at the Olympics

- Flag of the German Empire
- IOC code: GER
- NOC: National Olympic Committee for Germany

in Athens
- Competitors: 49 in 9 sports
- Medals Ranked 7th: Gold 7 Silver 6 Bronze 5 Total 18

Summer appearances
- 1896; 1900; 1904; 1908; 1912; 1920–1924; 1928; 1932; 1936; 1948; 1952; 1956–1988; 1992; 1996; 2000; 2004; 2008; 2012; 2016; 2020; 2024

Winter appearances
- 1928; 1932; 1936; 1948; 1952; 1956–1988; 1992; 1994; 1998; 2002; 2006; 2010; 2014; 2018; 2022; 2026

Other related appearances
- Saar (1952); United Team of Germany (1956–1964); East Germany (1968–1988); West Germany (1968–1988)

Germany competed at the 1906 Intercalated Games in Athens, Greece. 49 athletes, all men, competed in 41 events in 9 sports.

== Athletics ==
Track

Athlete	Events	Heat		Semifinals		Final	
Athlete	Events	Result	Rank	Result	Rank	Result	Rank
Vincent Duncker	100 metres	12.2	2 Q	did not start		did not advance	
Martin Beckmann	100 metres	Unknown	3	did not advance			
Martin Brustmann	100 metres	Unknown	3	did not advance			
Wilhelm Ritzenhoff	100 metres	Unknown	4	did not advance			
Fritz Hofmann	100 metres	Unknown	5	did not advance			
Julius Wagner	100 metres	Unknown	Unknown	did not advance			
Vincent Duncker	400 metres	Unknown	2 Q	Unknown	3	did not advance	
Johannes Runge	400 metres	Unknown	2	did not advance			
Martin Beckmann	400 metres	Unknown	3	did not advance			
Johannes Runge	800 metres	Unknown	2 Q	n/a		did not finish	
Vincent Duncker	800 metres	did not finish		n/a		did not advance	
Hermann Müller	5 Mile	n/a				did not finish	
Hermann Müller	Marathon	n/a				3-21:00.0	9
Robert Sennecke	Marathon	n/a				did not finish	
Vincent Duncker	110 metres hurdles	Unknown	2 Q	17.4	1 Q	Unknown	3rd place, bronze medalist(s)
Hermann Müller	3000 metre walk	n/a				15:20.0	2nd place, silver medalist(s)

Field

Athlete	Events	Final	
Athlete	Events	Result	Rank
Paul Weinstein	High jump	1.650	8
Josef Krämer	High jump	Unknown	Unknown
Paul Weinstein	Standing high jump	1.250	7
Julius Wagner	Long jump	5.95	11
Johannes Runge	Long jump	5.90	12
Martin Brustmann	Long jump	5.85	14
Paul Weinstein	Long jump	5.725	16
Arthur Mallwitz	Long jump	5.380	24
Julius Wagner	Standing long jump	2.750	14
Martin Brustmann	Standing long jump	2.700	17
Arthur Mallwitz	Standing long jump	2.675	20
Wilhelm Ritzenhoff	Standing long jump	2.670	21
Paul Weinstein	Standing long jump	2.650	23
Paul Weinstein	Triple jump	12.615	9
Martin Brustmann	Triple jump	No mark	
Carl Kaltenbach	Shot put	Unknown	Unknown
Julius Wagner	Shot put	Unknown	Unknown
Wilhelm Ritzenhoff	Stone throw	Unknown	Unknown
Carl Kaltenbach	Stone throw	Unknown	Unknown
Otto Franke	Stone throw	Unknown	Unknown
Julius Wagner	Stone throw	Unknown	Unknown
Carl Kaltenbach	Discus	Unknown	Unknown
Wilhelm Dörr	Discus	Unknown	Unknown
Julius Wagner	Discus Greek style	Unknown	Unknown
Carl Kaltenbach	Javelin	Unknown	Unknown
Paul Weinstein	Javelin	Unknown	Unknown
Julius Wagner	Pentathlon (Ancient)	37	8
Arthur Mallwitz	Pentathlon (Ancient)	38	12
Wilhelm Ritzenhoff	Pentathlon (Ancient)	41	14
Wilhelm Dörr	Pentathlon (Ancient)	44	16
Carl Kaltenbach	Pentathlon (Ancient)	47	17

== Cycling ==
Athlete	Events	Heat		Semifinals		Final	
Athlete	Events	Result	Rank	Result	Rank	Result	Rank
Adolf Böhm	Individual road race	n/a				2-41:46	5
Martin Klöb	Individual road race	n/a				Unknown	11
Max Kricheldorf	Individual road race	n/a				Unknown	12
Max Götze	Individual road race	n/a				did not finish	
Erich Dannenberg	Individual road race	n/a				did not finish	
Bruno Götze	Individual road race	n/a				did not finish	
Otto Küpferling	Sprint	n/a				Unknown	Unknown
Karl Arnold	Sprint	n/a				Unknown	Unknown
Bruno Götze	Sprint	n/a				Unknown	Unknown
Max Götze	Sprint	n/a				Unknown	Unknown
Otto Küpferling	333 metres time trial	n/a				24 1/5	8
Max Götze	333 metres time trial	n/a				24 1/5	8
Bruno Götze	333 metres time trial	n/a				24 1/5	8
Erich Dannenberg	333 metres time trial	n/a				25 4/5	20
Max Götze; Bruno Götze	Tandem sprint 2000 metres	2:54 1/5	1 Q	n/a		Unknown	2nd place, silver medalist(s)
Otto Küpferling; Karl Arnold	Tandem sprint 2000 metres	Unknown	Unknown q	n/a		Unknown	3rd place, bronze medalist(s)
Max Götze	5000 metres	Unknown	2 q	Unknown	2 q	Unknown	5
Bruno Götze	5000 metres	Unknown	3	did not advance			
Erich Dannenberg	5000 metres	Unknown	4	did not advance			
Karl Arnold	5000 metres	Disqualified		did not advance			
Otto Küpferling	5000 metres	3:32 4/5	1 Q	Unknown	3	did not advance	
Erich Dannenberg	20 kilometres	Unknown	Unknown Q	n/a		Unknown	5
Adolf Böhm	20 kilometres	Unknown	Unknown Q	n/a		did not finish	
Karl Arnold	20 kilometres	Unknown	Unknown	n/a		did not advance	
Martin Klöb	20 kilometres	Unknown	Unknown	n/a		did not advance	

== Diving ==
Athlete	Event	Points	Rank
Gottlob Walz	10 m platform	156.0	1st place, gold medalist(s)
Georg Hoffmann	10 m platform	150.2	2nd place, silver medalist(s)
Albert Zürner	10 m platform	144.6	4
Fritz Nicolai	10 m platform	138.0	8

== Fencing ==
Athlete	Events	Heat Group	Semifinal Group	Final Group
Athlete	Events	Rank	Rank	Rank
Gustav Casmir	Individual Foil	1 Q	2 Q	1st place, gold medalist(s)
Emil Schön	Individual Foil	1 Q	Unknown	did not advance
Jakob Erckrath de Bary	Individual Foil	1 Q	Unknown	did not advance
August Petri	Individual Foil	Unknown	did not advance	
Emil Schön	Individual Épée	3 Q	1 Q	5
Jakob Erckrath de Bary; Gustav Casmir; August Petri; Emil Schön	Épée Team	Great Britain (GBR); 2–9	did not advance	
Gustav Casmir	Individual Sabre	1 Q	1 Q	2nd place, silver medalist(s)
Jakob Erckrath de Bary	Individual Sabre	Unknown	did not advance	
Emil Schön	Individual Sabre	Unknown	did not advance	
August Petri	Individual Sabre	Unknown	did not advance	
Robert Krünert	Individual Sabre	Unknown	did not advance	
Gustav Casmir	Individual Sabre three hits	1 Q	n/a	1st place, gold medalist(s)
Emil Schön	Individual Sabre three hits	2 Q	n/a	4
Robert Krünert	Individual Sabre three hits	Unknown	n/a	did not advance
August Petri	Individual Sabre three hits	did not finish	n/a	did not advance
Jakob Erckrath de Bary	Individual Sabre three hits	did not finish	n/a	did not advance
Jakob Erckrath de Bary; Gustav Casmir; August Petri; Emil Schön	Sabre Team	Netherlands (NED); W	n/a	Greece (GRE); W (gold)

== Gymnastics ==
Athlete	Events	Final	
Athlete	Events	Result	Rank
Carl Ohms	Individual All-Around	112	4
Wilhelm Weber	Individual All-Around	110	6
Josef Krämer	Individual All-Around	108	12
Bruno Mahler	Individual All-Around	105	13
Otto Wiegand	Individual All-Around	103	14
Adolf Schirmer	Individual All-Around	101	16
Cassius Hermes	Individual All-Around	99	18
Karl Schwarz	Individual All-Around	99	18
Julius Wagner	Individual All-Around	99	18
Otto Franke	Individual All-Around	95	22
Carl Ohms	Individual All-Around (5 events)	93	4
Wilhelm Weber	Individual All-Around (5 events)	90	7
Josef Krämer	Individual All-Around (5 events)	90	7
Bruno Mahler	Individual All-Around (5 events)	85	17
Otto Wiegand	Individual All-Around (5 events)	83	18
Adolf Schirmer	Individual All-Around (5 events)	83	18
Cassius Hermes	Individual All-Around (5 events)	80	23
Karl Schwarz	Individual All-Around (5 events)	90	7
Julius Wagner	Individual All-Around (5 events)	80	23
Otto Franke	Individual All-Around (5 events)	76	28
Bernhard Abraham; Otto Franke; Georg Hax; Cassius Hermes; Julius Keyl; Josef Krämer; Bruno Mahler; Carl Ohms; Adolf Schirmer; Karl Schwarz; Julius Wagner; Wilhelm Weber; Otto Wiegand	All-round Team	16.25	5

== Swimming ==
Athlete	Events	Heat		Final	
Athlete	Events	Result	Rank	Result	Rank
Georg Hoffmann	100 metres freestyle	Unknown	Unknown	did not advance	
Max Pape	One mile freestyle	n/a		32:34.6	4
Emil Rausch	One mile freestyle	n/a		32:40.6	5
Ernst Bahnmeyer	One mile freestyle	n/a		33:29.4	6
Oscar Schiele	One mile freestyle	n/a		33:52.4	7
Ernst Bahnmeyer; Oscar Schiele; Emil Rausch; Max Pape	4 x 250 metres freestyle relay	n/a		17:16.2	2nd place, silver medalist(s)

== Tug of war ==
Athlete
Wilhelm Born
Wilhelm Dörr
Carl Kaltenbach
Josef Krämer
Wilhelm Ritzenhoff
Heinrich Rondi
Heinrich Schneidereit
Julius Wagner

All matches were best-of-three pulls.

Round 1

30 April 1906

Germany	2–0	Austria

Gold Medal

30 April 1906

Germany	2–0	Greece

== Weightlifting ==
Athlete	Event	Weight	Rank
Heinrich Schneidereit	One hand lift	70.75	3rd place, bronze medalist(s)
Heinrich Rondi	One hand lift	65.45	6
Heinrich Schneidereit	Two hand lift	129.5	3rd place, bronze medalist(s)
Heinrich Rondi	Two hand lift	129.5	3rd place, bronze medalist(s)

== Wrestling ==
Greco-Roman

Athlete	Event	Round 1	Quarterfinals	Semifinals	Final Group		
Athlete	Event	Opposition Result	Opposition Result	Opposition Result	Opposition Result	Opposition Result	Rank
Heinrich Rondi	Heavyweight	Bye	Jensen (DEN); L	did not advance			4
Wilhelm Born	Heavyweight	Dubois (BEL); L	did not advance				7
