= Austria at the 1906 Intercalated Games =

Austria at the Olympics

- IOC code: AUT

in Athens
- Competitors: 31 in 9 sports
- Medals Ranked 9th: Gold 3 Silver 3 Bronze 3 Total 9

Summer appearances
- 1896; 1900; ~~1904~~; 1908; 1912; 1920; 1924; 1928; 1932; 1936; 1948; 1952; 1956; 1960; 1964; 1968; 1972; 1976; 1980; 1984; 1988; 1992; 1996; 2000; 2004; 2008; 2012; 2016; 2020; 2024; 2028

Winter appearances
- 1924; 1928; 1932; 1936; 1948; 1952; 1956; 1960; 1964; 1968; 1972; 1976; 1980; 1984; 1988; 1992; 1994; 1998; 2002; 2006; 2010; 2014; 2018; 2022; 2026

Austria competed at the 1906 Intercalated Games in Athens, Greece. 31 athletes, all men, competed in 46 events in 9 sports.

== Medalists ==
Medal	Name	Sport	Event
Gold	Josef Steinbach	Weightlifting	One hand lift
Gold	Otto Scheff	Swimming	Men's 400 metre freestyle
Gold	Rudolf Watzl	Wrestling	Greco-Roman Lightweight
Silver	Josef Steinbach	Weightlifting	Two hand lift
Silver	Henri Baur	Wrestling	Greco-Roman Heavyweight
Silver	Rudolf Lindmayer	Wrestling	Greco-Roman Middleweight
Bronze	Otto Scheff	Swimming	Men's 1 mile freestyle
Bronze	Rudolf Watzl	Wrestling	Greco-Roman Overall
Bronze	Otto Satzinger	Diving	Men's 10 metre platform

== Athletics ==
Track

Athlete	Events	Heat		Semifinals		Final	
Athlete	Events	Result	Rank	Result	Rank	Result	Rank
Gustav Krojer	100 metres	Unknown	3	did not advance			
Robert Schöffthaler	100 metres	Unknown	4	did not advance			
Karl Lampelmayer	100 metres	Disq		did not advance			
Karl Lampelmayer	400 metres	Unknown	4	did not advance			
Felix Kwieton	1500 metres	Unknown	Unknown	n/a		did not advance	
Felix Kwieton	5 mile	n/a				Unknown	Unknown
Felix Kwieton	Marathon	n/a				Unknown	Unknown
Robert Schöffthaler	110 metres hurdles	Unknown	Unknown	did not advance			
Eugen Spiegler	1500 metre walk	n/a				Disq	
Eugen Spiegler	3000 metre walk	n/a				Disq	

Field

Athlete	Events	Final	
Athlete	Events	Result	Rank
Gustav Krojer	High jump	Unknown	Unknown
Theodor Scheidl	High jump	Unknown	Unknown
Gustav Krojer	Standing high jump	1.125	9
Theodor Scheidl	Standing high jump	Disq	
Gustav Krojer	Long Jump	5.625	18
Karl Lampelmayer	Long Jump	5.385	23
Gustav Krojer	Standing long Jump	2.570	24
Theodor Scheidl	Standing long Jump	2.775	13
Gustav Krojer	Triple Jump	11.985	15
Karl Lampelmayer	Triple Jump	No mark	
Leopold Lahner	Shot put	Unknown	Unknown
Franz Solar	Shot put	Unknown	Unknown
Josef Wittmann	Shot put	Unknown	Unknown
Leopold Lahner	Stone throw	Unknown	Unknown
Josef Wittmann	Stone throw	Unknown	Unknown
Henri Baur	Discus throw (Greek style)	Unknown	Unknown
Theodor Scheidl	Discus throw (Greek style)	Unknown	Unknown
Josef Wittmann	Discus throw (Greek style)	Unknown	Unknown
Theodor Scheidl	Pentathlon	33 points	9
Henri Baur	Pentathlon	51 points	20
Gustav Krojer	Pentathlon	56 points	22
Franz Solar	Pentathlon	68 points	24

== Cycling ==
Athlete	Events	Heat		Semifinals		Final	
Athlete	Events	Result	Rank	Result	Rank	Result	Rank
Hans Holly	Individual road race	n/a				Unknown	8
Konrad Puhrer	Individual road race	n/a				Unknown	9
Otto Meixner	Individual road race	n/a				Unknown	13
Hans Holly	Sprint	n/a				Unknown	Unknown
Konrad Puhrer	Sprint	n/a				Unknown	Unknown
Otto Meixner	Sprint	n/a				Unknown	Unknown
Alois Wutte	Sprint	n/a				Unknown	Unknown
Hans Holly	333 metres time trial	n/a				24 4/5	17
Konrad Puhrer	333 metres time trial	n/a				24 2/5	13
Otto Meixner	333 metres time trial	n/a				26 1/5	21
Alois Wutte	333 metres time trial	n/a				25 2/5	18
Hans Holly	5000 metres	Unknown	3	did not advance			
Konrad Puhrer	5000 metres	Unknown	4	did not advance			
Otto Meixner	5000 metres	Unknown	2	did not advance			
Alois Wutte	5000 metres	Disq		did not advance			
Otto Meixner; Alois Wutte	Tandem sprint 2000 metres	Unknown	2	n/a		did not advance	
Hans Holly	20 kilometres	Unknown	Unknown Q	n/a		Unknown	4

== Diving ==
Athlete	Event	Points	Rank
Otto Satzinger	10 m platform	147.4	3rd place, bronze medalist(s)

== Fencing ==
Athlete	Events	Heat Group	Semifinal Group	Final Group
Athlete	Events	Rank	Rank	Rank
Martin Harden	Individual Foil	1 Q	3 Q	4
Ernst Königsgarten	Individual Foil	Unknown	did not advance	
Ernst Königsgarten	Individual Épée	3	did not advance	
Ernst Königsgarten	Individual Sabre	Unknown	did not advance	
Ernst Königsgarten	Individual Sabre three hits	5 Q	n/a	6
Otto Herschmann	Individual Sabre three hits	Unknown	n/a	did not advance

== Shooting ==
Athlete	Event	Target Hits	Points	Rank
Ludwig Ternajgo	Free pistol, 50 metres	30	199	7
Heinrich Hintermann	Free pistol, 50 metres	29	169	24
Ludwig Ternajgo	Gras Model Revolver, 20 metres	30	208	5
Heinrich Hintermann	Gras Model Revolver, 20 metres	29	191	15
Ludwig Ternajgo	Military Revolver, 20 metres	30	235	6
Heinrich Hintermann	Military Revolver, 20 metres	30	214	20
Ludwig Ternajgo	Dueling Pistol Au Visé, 20 metres	30	218	5
Heinrich Hintermann	Dueling Pistol Au Visé, 20 metres	30	190	17
Ludwig Ternajgo	Dueling Pistol Au Commandement, 25 metres	23	103	8
Heinrich Hintermann	Dueling Pistol Au Commandement, 25 metres	19	75	16
Ludwig Ternajgo	Free Rifle any position, 300 metres	30	204	18
Heinrich Hintermann	Free Rifle any position, 300 metres	did not finish		
Ludwig Ternajgo	Rifle Gras Model Kneeling or Standing, 200 metres	28	136	15
Ludwig Ternajgo	Rifle Kneeling or Standing, 300 metres	28	202	13
Heinrich Hintermann	Rifle Kneeling or Standing, 300 metres	27	154	27

== Swimming ==
Athlete	Event	Time	Rank
Otto Scheff	400 metres freestyle	6:24.0	1st place, gold medalist(s)
Otto Scheff	1 mile freestyle	30:53.4	3rd place, bronze medalist(s)
Leopold Mayer	1 mile freestyle	34:41.0	8
Simon Orlik	1 mile freestyle	36:25.0	10
Edmond Bernhardt	1 mile freestyle	did not finish	
Otto Scheff; Leopold Mayer; Simon Orlik; Edmond Bernhardt	4x 250 metres freestyle relay	did not finish	

== Tug of war ==
Athlete
Rudolf Arnold
Henri Baur
Karl Höltl
Leopold Lahner
Rudolf Lindmayer
Franz Solar
Josef Steinbach
Josef Wittmann

All matches were best-of-three pulls.

Round 1

30 April 1906

Austria	0–2	Germany

Bronze Medal

30 April 1906

Austria	0–2	Sweden

== Weightlifting ==
Athlete	Event	Weight	Rank
Josef Steinbach	One hand lift	73.75	1st place, gold medalist(s)
Josef Steinbach	Two hand lift	136.5	2nd place, silver medalist(s)

== Wrestling ==
Greco-Roman

Athlete	Event	Round 1	Quarterfinals	Semifinals	Final Group		
Athlete	Event	Opposition Result	Opposition Result	Opposition Result	Opposition Result	Opposition Result	Rank
Rudolf Watzl	Lightweight	Kolyvas (GRE); W	n/a	Dobrinovitz (BEL); W	Holubán (HUN); W	Carlsen (DEN); W	1st place, gold medalist(s)
Alexander Wendrinsky	Lightweight	Petsas (GRE); W	n/a	Holubán (HUN); L	did not advance		4
Rudolf Lindmayer	Middleweight	Karotzieris (GRE); W	Solar (AUT); W	Weckman (FIN); L	n/a	Behrens (DEN); L	2nd place, silver medalist(s)
Wenzel Goldbach	Middleweight	Juery (FRA); W	bye	Behrens (DEN); L	n/a	Did not advance	4
Franz Solar	Middleweight	Palaiologos (GRE); W	Lindmayer (AUT); L	Did not advance	n/a	Did not advance	5
Karl Höltl	Middleweight	Behrens (DEN); L	did not advance		n/a	Did not advance	8
Henri Baur	Heavyweight	Weisz (HUN); W	Psaltopoulos (GRE); W	n/a	Dubois (BEL); W	Jensen (DEN); L	2nd place, silver medalist(s)
Rudolf Arnold	Heavyweight	Christopoulos (GRE); L	Did not advance	n/a	did not advance		8
Rudolf Watzl	All-Round	n/a			Jensen (DEN); L	Did not advance	3rd place, bronze medalist(s)
