= Diving at the 1912 Summer Olympics – Men's 10 metre platform =

Men's platform diving at the Games of the V Olympiad
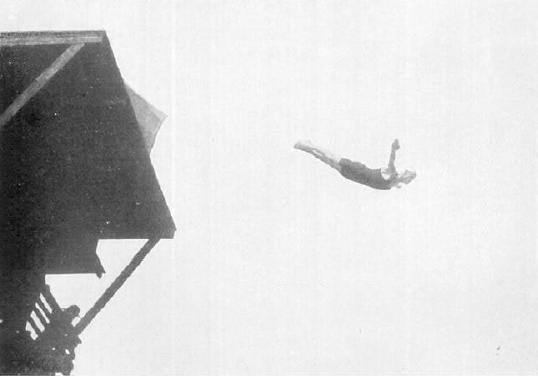
- Erik Adlerz on the way to the gold medal.
- Venue: Stockholm Olympic Stadium
- Dates: 12–15 July 1912
- Competitors: 23 from 7 nations

Medalists
1st place, gold medalist(s)		Erik Adlerz	Sweden
2nd place, silver medalist(s)		Albert Zürner	Germany
3rd place, bronze medalist(s)		Gustaf Blomgren	Sweden

The men's 10 metre platform, also known as plain and variety diving combined competition, was one of four diving events on the Diving at the 1912 Summer Olympics programme. The competition was held from Friday 12 July 1912 to Monday 15 July 1912. Twenty-three divers from seven nations competed.

== Results ==
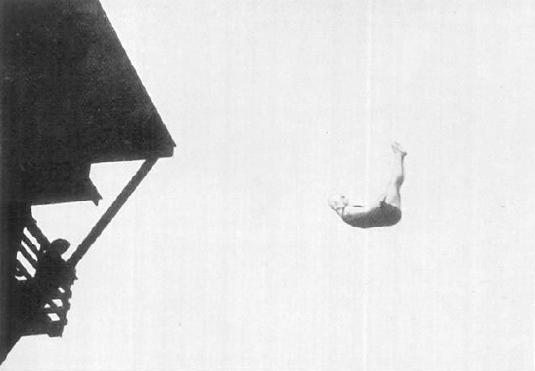
Albert Zürner on the way to the silver medal.

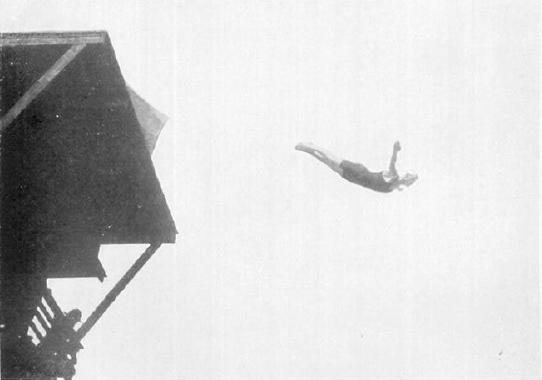
Toivo Aro who finished eighth in action.

The competition was actually held from both 10 metre and 5 metre platforms. Divers performed a standing plain dive and a running plain dive from the 10 metre platform, a running plain dive and a backward somersault from the 5 metre platform, and three dives of the competitor's choice from the 10 metre platform. Five judges scored each diver, giving two results. Each judge gave an ordinal placing for each diver in a group, with the five scores being summed to give a total ordinal points score. The judges also gave scores more closely resembling the modern scoring system.

=== First round ===
The two divers who scored the smallest number of points in each group of the first round plus the two best scoring non-qualified divers of all groups advanced to the final. Ordinal placings were used to rank divers within the group, but were not used to determine qualification.

==== Group 1 ====
Rank	Diver	Nation	Points	Score	Notes
1	Hjalmar Johansson	Sweden	9	68.06	Q
2	Albert Zürner	Germany	14	65.04	Q
3	Hans Luber	Germany	23	61.66	
4	Gösta Sjöberg	Sweden	24	62.08	
5	Ernst Brandsten	Sweden	24	61.42	
6	George Gaidzik	United States	25	62.56	
7	John Jansson	Sweden	27	59.75	
8	Kurt Behrens	Germany	33	58.35	
9	Leo Suni	Finland	45	48.93	

==== Group 2 ====
Rank	Diver	Nation	Points	Score	Notes
1	Erik Adlerz	Sweden	6	74.76	Q
2	Gustaf Blomgren	Sweden	9	68.50	Q
3	Harald Arbin	Sweden	15	62.75	q
4	Ernst Eklund	Sweden	20	59.94	
5	Sigvard Andersen	Norway	25	56.40	
6	Oskar Wetzell	Finland	32	50.46	
7	Kalle Kainuvaara	Finland	33	48.10	
-	Arthur McAleenan	United States	–	DNF	

==== Group 3 ====
Rank	Diver	Nation	Points	Score	Notes
1	Alvin Carlsson	Sweden	7	66.98	Q
2	George Yvon	Great Britain	9	65.70	Q
3	Toivo Aro	Finland	16	62.75	q
4	Robert Andersson	Sweden	18	60.39	
5	Jens Stefenson	Sweden	25	41.54	
-	John P. Lyons	Canada	–	DNF	

=== Final ===
In the final, ordinal placings were the primary ranking method with dive scores being used only to break ties.

Rank	Diver	Nation	Points	Score
1st place, gold medalist(s)	Erik Adlerz	Sweden	7	73.94
2nd place, silver medalist(s)	Albert Zürner	Germany	10	72.60
3rd place, bronze medalist(s)	Gustaf Blomgren	Sweden	16	69.56
4	Hjalmar Johansson	Sweden	22	67.80
5	George Yvon	Great Britain	22	67.66
6	Harald Arbin	Sweden	31	62.62
7	Alvin Carlsson	Sweden	32	63.16
8	Toivo Aro	Finland	40	57.05

== Sources ==
- Swedish Olympic Committee; Erik Bergvall (December 1913). "The Official Report of the Olympic Games of Stockholm 1912" (PDF). Wahlström & Widstrand. Archived from the original (pdf) on 10 April 2008.
- Herman de Wael (6 August 2001). "Diving 1912". Archived from the original on 5 July 2007.
