= Diving at the 1912 Summer Olympics =

Diving at the Games of the V Olympiad
- Venue: Djurgårdsbrunnsviken
- Dates: 6 July 1912 through 15 July 1912
- No. of events: 4
- Competitors: 57 from 10 nations

At the 1912 Summer Olympics in Stockholm, four diving events were contested. For the first time, women competed in diving at the Olympic Games. The competitions were held from Saturday 6 July 1912 to Monday 15 July 1912.

== Medal summary ==
The events are labelled as 10 metre platform, 3 metre springboard and plain high diving by the International Olympic Committee, and appeared on the 1912 Official Report as Plain and Variety Diving combined, Spring-board Diving and High (plain) Diving. The high diving events included dives from both 10 metre and 5 metre platforms, while the springboard diving included dives from 3 metre and 1 metre springboards.

=== Men ===
Event	Gold	Silver	Bronze
3 m springboard	Paul Günther (GER)	Hans Luber (GER)	Kurt Behrens (GER)
10 m platform	Erik Adlerz (SWE)	Albert Zürner (GER)	Gustaf Blomgren (SWE)
Plain high diving	Erik Adlerz (SWE)	Hjalmar Johansson (SWE)	John Jansson (SWE)

=== Women ===
Event	Gold	Silver	Bronze
10 m platform	Greta Johansson (SWE)	Lisa Regnell (SWE)	Isabelle White (GBR)

== Participating nations ==
A total of 57 divers (43 men and 14 women) from 10 nations (men from 9 nations - women from 3 nations) competed at the Stockholm Games:

- Austria (1) (men:0 women:1)
- Canada (2) (men:2 women:0)
- Finland (6) (men:6 women:0)
- Germany (4) (men:4 women:0)
- Great Britain (3) (men:2 women:1)
- Italy (1) (men:1 women:0)
- Norway (3) (men:3 women:0)
- Russia (1) (men:1 women:0)
- Sweden (34) (men:22 women:12)
- United States (2) (men:2 women:0)

== Medal table ==
Rank	Nation	Gold	Silver	Bronze	Total
1	Sweden	3	2	2	7
2	Germany	1	2	1	4
3	Great Britain	0	0	1	1
Totals (3 entries)		4	4	4	12
