= Diving at the 1912 Summer Olympics – Men's 3 metre springboard =

Men's springboard diving at the Games of the V Olympiad
- Venue: Stockholm Olympic Stadium
- Dates: 8–9 July 1912
- Competitors: 18 from 7 nations

Medalists
| 1st place, gold medalist(s) | | Paul Günther | Germany |
| 2nd place, silver medalist(s) | | Hans Luber | Germany |
| 3rd place, bronze medalist(s) | | Kurt Behrens | Germany |

The men's 3 metre springboard, also known as the spring-board diving competition, was one of four diving events on the diving at the 1912 Summer Olympics programme. The competition was held on Monday 8 July 1912, and Tuesday 9 July 1912. Eighteen divers from seven nations competed.

== Results ==
The competition was actually held from both 3 metre and 1 metre boards. Divers performed a running plain dive and a running forward somersault from the 1 metre board, a standing plain dive and a running plain dive from the 3 metre board, and three dives of the competitor's choice from the 3 metre board. Five judges scored each diver, giving two results. Each judge gave an ordinal placing for each diver in a group, with the five scores being summed to give a total ordinal points score. The judges also gave scores more closely resembling the modern scoring system.

=== First round ===
The two divers who scored the smallest number of points in each group of the first round plus the two best scoring non-qualified divers of all groups advanced to the final. Ordinal placings were used to rank divers within the group, but were not used to determine qualification.

==== Group 1 ====
| Place | Diver | Nation | Points | Score |
|---|---|---|---|---|
| 1 | Kurt Behrens | Germany | 6 | 80.14 |
| 2 | Paul Günther | Germany | 9 | 78.14 |
| 3 | Arthur McAleenan | United States | 15 | 68.02 |
| 4 | Ernst Brandsten | Sweden | 20 | 65.02 |
| 5 | Sven Nylund | Sweden | 28 | 62.60 |
| 6 | Eskil Brodd | Sweden | 29 | 62.60 |
| 7 | Oskar Wetzell | Finland | 33 | 58.70 |

==== Group 2 ====
| Place | Diver | Nation | Points | Score |
|---|---|---|---|---|
| 1 | John Jansson | Sweden | 5 | 77.77 |
| 2 | Albert Zürner | Germany | 10 | 74.64 |
| 3 | Ernst Eklund | Sweden | 16 | 53.02 |
| 4 | Carlo Bonfanti | Italy | 19 | 46.81 |

==== Group 3 ====
| Place | Diver | Nation | Points | Score |
|---|---|---|---|---|
| 1 | Hans Luber | Germany | 6 | 77.50 |
| 2 | Robert Zimmerman | Canada | 11 | 76.60 |
| 3 | George Gaidzik | United States | 16 | 74.03 |
| 4 | Herbert Pott | Great Britain | 17 | 73.94 |
| 5 | Ernfrid Appelqvist | Sweden | 25 | 62.61 |
| 6 | Axel Runström | Sweden | 30 | 58.42 |
| 7 | Erik Tjäder | Sweden | 35 | 53.56 |

=== Final ===
In the final, ordinal placings were the primary ranking method with dive scores being used only to break ties.

| Place | Diver | Nation | Points | Score |
|---|---|---|---|---|
| 1st place, gold medalist(s) | Paul Günther | Germany | 6 | 79.23 |
| 2nd place, silver medalist(s) | Hans Luber | Germany | 9 | 76.78 |
| 3rd place, bronze medalist(s) | Kurt Behrens | Germany | 22 | 73.73 |
| 4 | Albert Zürner | Germany | 23 | 73.33 |
| 5 | Robert Zimmerman | Canada | 24 | 72.54 |
| 6 | Herbert Pott | Great Britain | 28 | 71.45 |
| 7 | John Jansson | Sweden | 32 | 69.64 |
| 8 | George Gaidzik | United States | 36 | 68.01 |

== Sources ==
- Swedish Olympic Committee; Erik Bergvall (December 1913). "The Official Report of the Olympic Games of Stockholm 1912" (PDF). Wahlström & Widstrand. Archived from the original (pdf) on 10 April 2008.
- Herman de Wael (6 August 2001). "Diving 1912". Archived from the original on 5 July 2007.
