= Diving at the 1908 Summer Olympics =

Coordinates: 51.5136°N 0.2274°E

Diving at the Games of the IV Olympiad
- Venue: White City Stadium
- Dates: 14 July 1908 to 24 July 1908
- No. of events: 2
- Competitors: 39 from 9 nations

At the 1908 Summer Olympics in London, two diving events were contested, both for men only. The competition was held on Tuesday 14 and Friday 24 July 1908. While the competitive events were restricted to men only, an exhibition was performed by two women on 18 July.

== Medal summary ==
The events are labelled as 3 metre springboard and 10 metre platform by the International Olympic Committee, and appeared on the 1908 Official Report as high diving and fancy diving. The high diving event included dives from both 10 metre and 5 metre platforms, while the fancy diving included dives from 3 metre and 1 metre springboards.

Event	Gold	Silver	Bronze
3 m springboard	Albert Zürner (GER)	Kurt Behrens (GER)	George Gaidzik (USA)
3 m springboard	Albert Zürner (GER)	Kurt Behrens (GER)	Gottlob Walz (GER)
10 m platform	Hjalmar Johansson (SWE)	Karl Malmström (SWE)	Arvid Spångberg (SWE)

== Participating nations ==
A total of 39 divers from 9 nations competed at the London Games:

- Australasia (1)
- Belgium (1)
- Canada (1)
- Finland (2)
- Germany (5)
- Great Britain (16)
- Italy (1)
- Sweden (10)
- United States (2)

== Medal table ==
Rank	Nation	Gold	Silver	Bronze	Total
1	Germany	1	1	1	3
1	Sweden	1	1	1	3
3	United States	0	0	1	1
Totals (3 entries)		2	2	3	7
