= Diving at the 1912 Summer Olympics – Men's plain high diving =

Men's plain high diving at the Games of the V Olympiad
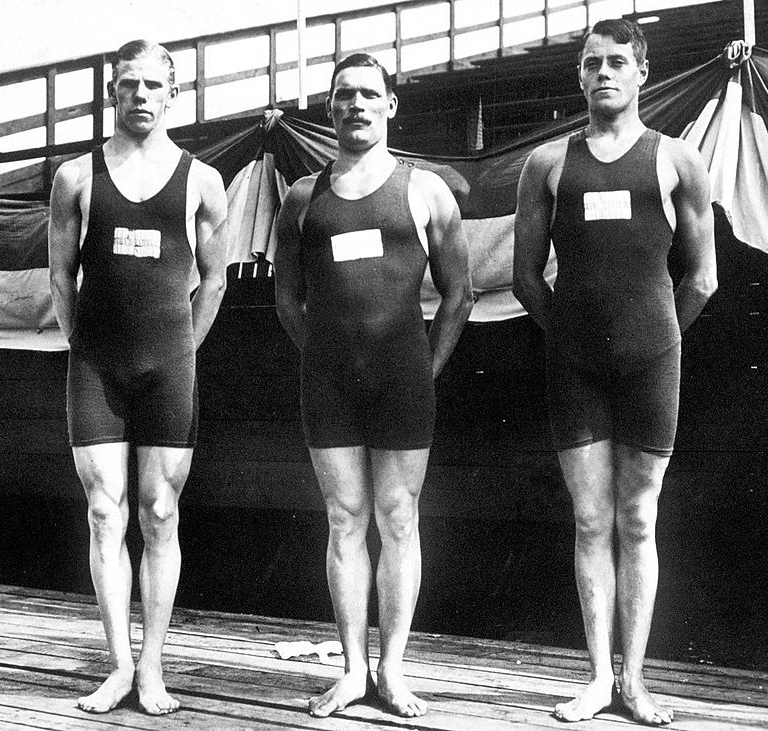
- Erik Adlerz, Hjalmar Johansson and John Jansson
- Venue: Stockholm Olympic Stadium
- Dates: 6–11 July 1912
- Competitors: 31 from 9 nations

Medalists
1st place, gold medalist(s)		Erik Adlerz	Sweden
2nd place, silver medalist(s)		Hjalmar Johansson	Sweden
3rd place, bronze medalist(s)		John Jansson	Sweden

The men's plain high diving was one of four diving events on the diving at the 1912 Summer Olympics programme. The competition was held on Saturday 6 July 1912, on Sunday 7 July 1912, and on Thursday 11 July 1912. Thirty-one divers from nine nations competed.

== Results ==
The competition was actually held from both 10 metre and 5 metre platforms. Divers performed a total of five dives: a standing dive and two running dives from the 10 metre platform, and a standing dive and a running dive from the 5 metre platform. Five judges scored each diver, giving two results. Each judge gave an ordinal placing for each diver in a group, with the five scores being summed to give a total ordinal points score. The judges also gave scores more closely resembling the modern scoring system.

=== First round ===
The divers who scored the smallest number of points in each group of the first round plus the four best scoring non-qualified divers of all groups advanced to the final. Ordinal placings were used to rank divers within the group, but were not used to determine qualification.

==== Group 1 ====
Rank	Diver	Nation	Points	Score	Notes
1	Paul Günther	Germany	8	36.1	Q
2	Torsten Eriksson	Sweden	11	35.8	
3	Tauno Ilmoniemi	Finland	13	35.0	
4	Alfred Johansson	Sweden	14	34.7	
5	Nils Tvedt	Norway	25	31.7	
6	Elis Holmer	Sweden	31	30.2	
7	Sigvard Andersen	Norway	32	28.6	
-	Viktor Baranov	Russia	-	DNF	

==== Group 2 ====
Rank	Diver	Nation	Points	Score	Notes
1	John Jansson	Sweden	5	38.3	Q
2	George Gaidzik	United States	13	36.2	
3	George Yvon	Great Britain	17	35.2	
4	Gunnar Ekstrand	Sweden	18	35.3	
5	Arthur McAleenan	United States	20	34.9	
6	Carlo Bonfanti	Italy	32	28.5	
7	Alfred Engelsen	Norway	33	28.3	

==== Group 3 ====
Rank	Diver	Nation	Points	Score	Notes
1	Hjalmar Johansson	Sweden	7	40.1	Q
2	Toivo Aro	Finland	10	39.4	q
3	Axel Runström	Sweden	15	38.3	q
4	Ernst Brandsten	Sweden	19	37.7	q
5	Viktor Crondahl	Sweden	22	37.0	q
6	Hans Luber	Germany	27	36.2	
7	Kurt Behrens	Germany	31	35.1	
8	John P. Lyons	Canada	40	32.5	
9	Jens Stefenson	Sweden	44	31.2	

==== Group 4 ====
Rank	Diver	Nation	Points	Score	Notes
1	Erik Adlerz	Sweden	5	39.9	Q
2	Oskar Wetzell	Finland	13	33.8	
3	Kalle Kainuvaara	Finland	14	33.2	
4	Albert Nyman	Finland	21	32.0	
5	Leo Suni	Finland	22	32.1	
6	Albert Zürner	Germany	26	31.7	
7	Sven Montan	Sweden	31	30.2	

=== Final ===
In the final, ordinal placings were the primary ranking method with dive scores being used only to break ties.

Rank	Diver	Nation	Points	Score
1st place, gold medalist(s)	Erik Adlerz	Sweden	7	40.0
2nd place, silver medalist(s)	Hjalmar Johansson	Sweden	12	39.3
3rd place, bronze medalist(s)	John Jansson	Sweden	12	39.1
4	Viktor Crondahl	Sweden	22	37.1
5	Toivo Aro	Finland	26	36.3
6	Axel Runström	Sweden	26	36.0
7	Ernst Brandsten	Sweden	28	36.2
-	Paul Günther	Germany	-	DNF

== Sources ==
- Swedish Olympic Committee; Erik Bergvall (December 1913). "The Official Report of the Olympic Games of Stockholm 1912" (PDF). Wahlström & Widstrand. Archived from the original (pdf) on 10 April 2008.
- Herman de Wael (6 August 2001). "Diving 1912". Archived from the original on 5 July 2007.
