= Diving at the 1908 Summer Olympics – Men's 3 metre springboard =

Men's springboard diving at the Games of the IV Olympiad
- Venue: White City Stadium
- Dates: 14–18 July
- Competitors: 23 from 8 nations

Medalists
1st place, gold medalist(s)		Albert Zürner	Germany
2nd place, silver medalist(s)		Kurt Behrens	Germany
3rd place, bronze medalist(s)		George Gaidzik	United States
3rd place, bronze medalist(s)		Gottlob Walz	Germany

The men's 3 metre springboard, also known as the fancy diving competition, was one of two diving events on the Diving at the 1908 Summer Olympics programme, along with the men's 10 metre platform. The competition was held on Tuesday 14 and Saturday 18 July 1908. Twenty-three divers from eight nations competed. Each nation could enter up to 12 divers.

== Competition format ==
The competition was actually held from both 3 metre and 1 metre boards. Divers performed a running plain dive and a running forward somersault from the 1 metre board, a one-and-a-half somersault and a backward spring and forward dive from the 3 metre board, and three (different) dives of the competitor's choice from the 3 metre board. The voluntary dives were selected from a list of 20 options, most of which could be done from either a standing or running start.

Each judge gave a score between 0 and 10 points, in increments of half a point, for each dive. Points were then added to voluntary dives based on degree of difficulty (difficulty points ranged from 1 to 10 per dive). No difficulty points were awarded for the compulsory dives. The dive scores from each judge were summed and divided by 3, with the three judges' results added to give a final score. However, the final scores were not technically determinative (except as tie-breakers); after the scores were calculated, each judge ranked the competitors (and could choose to follow the scores or not) and the competition was decided on a point-for-place system with the competitor with the lowest total ranking from the three judges winning. Final scores were used as tie-breakers if this aggregate ranking was tied. In no case was the point-for-place result different for any round from the final scores, however, and ties in final scores led to an extra diver advancing to the semifinals as well as two bronze medals being awarded; the Official Report contains only the final scores and not the ordinal rankings from the judges. Indeed, it appears that "the ordinal scores are not recorded in any source" and "the individual judges' scores are not known, so it is not possible to reconstruct the ordinal placements."

The competition was held over three rounds (first round, semifinals, and final). The first round consisted of 5 groups of between 3 and 6 divers each; the top 2 divers in each group advanced to the semifinals. The semifinals consisted of 2 groups, one of 5 divers and one of 6 divers (due to a tie in the first round resulting in an additional diver advancing). The top 2 divers in each group advanced to the final. The final featured 4 divers.

== Results ==
=== First round ===
The two divers who scored the greatest number of points in each group of the first round advanced to the semifinals. A tie in the third group for second place resulted in both divers joining the group winner in advancing, for a total of 11 divers in the semifinals.

==== Group 1 ====
Rank	Diver	Nation	Score	Notes
1	George Gaidzik	United States	82.8	Q
2	Heinz Freyschmidt	Germany	78.1	Q
3	Robert Zimmerman	Canada	74.0	
4	Harry Crank	Great Britain	70.3	
5	Alexander Beckett	Great Britain	67.5	

==== Group 2 ====
Rank	Diver	Nation	Score	Notes
1	Albert Zürner	Germany	83.6	Q
2	Harold Clarke	Great Britain	78.6	Q
3	Albert Taylor	Great Britain	58.8	

==== Group 3 ====
Rank	Diver	Nation	Score	Notes
1	Kurt Behrens	Germany	83.6	Q
2	Ralph Errington	Great Britain	70.83	Q
2	Oskar Wetzell	Finland	70.83	Q
4	Karl Malmström	Sweden	70.3	
5	William Hoare	Great Britain	67.8	

==== Group 4 ====
Rank	Diver	Nation	Score	Notes
1	Herbert Pott	Great Britain	82.5	Q
2	Fritz Nicolai	Germany	67.1	Q
3	William Bull	Great Britain	66.0	
4	Carlo Bonfanti	Italy	65.8	
5	Sigfrid Larsson	Sweden	64.5	
6	Reginald Baker	Australasia	61.3	

==== Group 5 ====
Rank	Diver	Nation	Score	Notes
1	Gottlob Walz	Germany	81.3	Q
2	Henry Grote	United States	79.5	Q
3	Harold Smyrk	Great Britain	78.3	
4	Charles Cross	Great Britain	64.5	

=== Semifinals ===
The two divers from each semifinal with the highest scores advanced to the final.

==== Semifinal 1 ====
Rank	Diver	Nation	Score	Notes
1	Kurt Behrens	Germany	83.0	Q
2	Gottlob Walz	Germany	80.3	Q
3	Herbert Pott	Great Britain	79.6	
4	Heinz Freyschmidt	Germany	79.3	
5	Ralph Errington	Great Britain	72.6	
6	Oskar Wetzell	Finland	70.1	

==== Semifinal 2 ====
Rank	Diver	Nation	Score	Notes
1	George Gaidzik	United States	85.6	Q
2	Albert Zürner	Germany	82.8	Q
3	Fritz Nicolai	Germany	81.8	
4	Harold Clarke	Great Britain	81.1	
5	Henry Grote	United States	74.5	

=== Final ===
A tie for third place resulted in both divers receiving bronze medals.

Rank	Diver	Nation	Score
1st place, gold medalist(s)	Albert Zürner	Germany	85.5
2nd place, silver medalist(s)	Kurt Behrens	Germany	85.3
3rd place, bronze medalist(s)	George Gaidzik	United States	80.8
3rd place, bronze medalist(s)	Gottlob Walz	Germany	80.8

== Sources ==
- Cook, Theodore Andrea (1908). The Fourth Olympiad, Being the Official Report. London: British Olympic Association.
- De Wael, Herman (2001). "Diving 1908". Herman's Full Olympians. Archived from the original on 4 June 2011.
