= Alfred Johansson =

Alfred Johansson may refer to:

- Alfred Johansson (diver)
- Alfred Johansson (football manager)
