= Ernst Eklund =

Ernst Eklund may refer to:

- Ernst Eklund (actor) (1882–1971), Swedish actor
- Ernst Eklund (diver) (1894–1952), Swedish diver
