= Tjader =

Tjader (also Tjäder) is a surname, originating from the Swedish term for the capercaillie. Notable people with the surname include:

- Cal Tjader (1925–1982), American Latin jazz musician
- Erik Tjäder (1863–1949), Swedish diver
- Jesper Tjäder (born 1994), Swedish freestyle skier
