= Appelqvist =

Appelqvist is a Swedish surname. Numbers of persons in Sweden. Alternative spellings (with population estimates):

- Appelqvist 932
- Apelqvist 472
- Appelkvist 370
- Appelquist 197
- Apelkvist 37
- Apelquist 14

== Notables ==
- Emilia Brodin (nee Appelqvist, born 1990), Swedish footballer
- Ernfrid Appelqvist (1888–1966), Swedish diver
- Ingrid Appelquist (born 1931), Swedish curler
- Thomas Appelquist (born 1941), American physicist
