= Athletics at the 1906 Intercalated Games – Men's 100 metres =

Men's 100 metres at the 1906 Intercalated Games
- Venue: Panathenaic Stadium
- Date: 25–27 April 1906
- Competitors: 42 from 13 nations
- Winning time: 11.2 s

Medalists
1st place, gold medalist(s)		Archie Hahn	United States
2nd place, silver medalist(s)		Fay Moulton	United States
3rd place, bronze medalist(s)		Nigel Barker	Australia

The men's 100 metres competition at the 1906 Intercalated Games was held at the Panathenaic Stadium in Athens, Greece from 25 to 27 April. A total of 42 athletes from 13 nations competed in the 100 m event.

== Summary ==
The first round of the competition saw several false starts and disqualifications, partly due to the athletes lack of familiarity with the local starter's orders, which were called in Greek. After the first round this issue was rectified. There was no individual timing for each runner and only the winners of each race had their times recorded. Other athletes were ranked visually and in some instances the remaining distance between an athlete and the one behind him was documented.

Four of the six finalists were Americans and two of them took first and second place – Archie Hahn and Fay Moulton. Australia's Nigel Barker came third. Hahn's win built upon his victory from the 1904 Olympic Games. He is sometimes credited with being the first man to retain the Olympic 100 m, but this is disputed as the Intercalated Games have not received official recognition as part of the Olympic series from the International Olympic Committee. Some sports historians argue that the events should be considered part of the true Olympic series as their success helped sustain the modern Olympic movement – the 1900 Summer Olympics and 1904 Summer Olympics were less international and were largely overshadowed by the World's Fairs that the host cities incorporated the games into.

== Schedule ==
Date	Round
Wednesday, 25 April 1906	Heats Semi-final
Friday, 27 April 1906	Finals

== Records ==
These were the standing world and Olympic records (in seconds) prior to the 1906 Intercalated Games.

Type	Time	Athlete	Location	Date
World record	10.8^{[nb]}	Luther Cary	Paris, France	4 July 1891
World record	10.8^{[nb]}	Cecil Lee	Brussels, Belgium	25 September 1892
World record	10.8^{[nb]}	Etienne De Re	Brussels, Belgium	4 August 1893
World record	10.8^{[nb]}	L. Atcherley	Frankfurt, Germany	13 April 1895
World record	10.8^{[nb]}	Harry Beaton	Rotterdam, Netherlands	28 August 1895
World record	10.8^{[nb]}	Harald Anderson-Arbin	Helsingborg, Sweden	9 August 1896
World record	10.8^{[nb]}	Isaac Westergren	Gävle, Sweden	11 September 1898
World record	10.8^{[nb]}	Isaac Westergren	Gävle, Sweden	10 September 1899
World record	10.8^{[nb]}	Frank Jarvis	Paris, France	14 July 1900
World record	10.8^{[nb]}	Walter Tewksbury	Paris, France	14 July 1900
World record	10.8^{[nb]}	Carl Ljung	Stockholm, Sweden	23 September 1900
World record	10.8^{[nb]}	Walter Tewksbury	Philadelphia, United States	6 October 1900
World record	10.8^{[nb]}	André Passat	Bordeaux, France	14 June 1903
World record	10.8^{[nb]}	Louis Kuhn	Bordeaux, France	14 June 1903
World record	10.8^{[nb]}	Harald Grønfeldt	Aarhus, Denmark	5 July 1903
World record	10.8^{[nb]}	Eric Frick	Jönköping, Sweden	9 August 1903
World record	10.8^{[nb]}	Vincent Duncker	Berlin, Germany	6 August 1905
Olympic record	10.8	Frank Jarvis	Paris, France	14 July 1900
Olympic record	10.8	Walter Tewksbury	Paris, France	14 July 1900

- ^{nb} World records before 1912 have not been officially ratified as world records by the International Association of Athletics Federations (IAAF).

== Results ==
=== Heats ===
Qualification: First 2 in each heat (Q) advance to the semi-finals. There were ten heats: seven of them contained five runners, while the remaining three had two or three entrants.

From the smaller heats, only Fay Moulton (first in the three-man third heat) and Axel Ljung (second in the two-man seventh heat) participated in the semi-final. In heats eight and ten, the second-placed athletes Vincent Duncker and Meyer Prinstein, did not compete in the semi-final.

==== Heat 1 ====
Rank	Athlete	Nation	Time	Notes
1	Archie Hahn	United States	12.0	Q
2	Otto Bock	Denmark	Unknown	Q
—	Georgios Zinon	Greece	DSQ	
—	Julius Wagner	Germany	DSQ	
—	Karl Lampelmayer	Austria	DSQ	

==== Heat 2 ====
Rank	Athlete	Nation	Time	Notes
1	William Eaton	United States	11.6	Q
2	Gaspare Torretta	Italy	Unknown	Q
3	Géo Malfait	France	Unknown	
4	Robert Schöffthaler	Austria	Unknown	
5	Fritz Hofmann	Germany	Unknown	

==== Heat 3 ====
Rank	Athlete	Nation	Time	Notes
1	Fay Moulton	United States	11.8	Q
2	Pantelis Ektoros	Greece	Unknown	Q
3	Martin Beckmann	Germany	Unknown	

==== Heat 4 ====
Rank	Athlete	Nation	Time	Notes
1	Knut Lindberg	Sweden	11.8	Q
2	Bohuslav Pohl-Polenský	Bohemia	Unknown	Q
—	Konstantinos Devetzis	Greece	Unknown	
—	Aage Petersen	Denmark	DSQ	
—	Patestos Patestidis	Greece	DSQ	

==== Heat 5 ====
Rank	Athlete	Nation	Time	Notes
1	Georgios Kesar	Greece	12.6	Q
—	George Queyrouze	United States	DNF	

==== Heat 6 ====
Rank	Athlete	Nation	Time	Notes
1	William Schick	United States	12.2	Q
2	Wyndham Halswelle	Great Britain	Unknown	Q
3	Gustav Krojer	Austria	Unknown	
4	Wilhelm Ritzenhoff	Germany	Unknown	
5	Gunnar Rönström	Sweden	Unknown	

==== Heat 7 ====
Rank	Athlete	Nation	Time	Notes
1	Reginald Reed	Great Britain	12.0	Q
2	Axel Ljung	Sweden	Unknown	Q

==== Heat 8 ====
Rank	Athlete	Nation	Time	Notes
1	Alfred Healey	Great Britain	12.2	Q
2	Vincent Duncker	Germany	12.2	Q
3	Sotirios Anastasopoulos	Greece	Unknown	
4	Uno Häggman	Finland	Unknown	
5	Nikolaos Mourmouris	Greece	Unknown	

==== Heat 9 ====
Rank	Athlete	Nation	Time	Notes
1	Lawson Robertson	United States	11.4	Q
2	Nigel Barker	Australia	Unknown	Q
3	Martin Brustmann	Germany	Unknown	
—	A. Papadakis	Greece	DSQ	
—	Otto Hahnel-Kohout	Bohemia	DSQ	

==== Heat 10 ====
Rank	Athlete	Nation	Time	Notes
1	Sidney Abrahams	Great Britain	11.8	Q
2	Meyer Prinstein	United States	Unknown	Q
3	Marc Bélin du Coteau	France	Unknown	
—	Miksa Hellmich	Hungary	DSQ	
—	Vasilios Stournaras	Greece	DSQ	

=== Semifinals ===
Qualification: First 2 in each heat (Q) advance to the Final. The semi-finals were divided into three races: heat one with five runners, heat two with three, and heat three with six.

==== Semifinal 1 ====
Rank	Athlete	Nation	Time	Notes
1	Archie Hahn	United States	11.4	Q
2	Lawson Robertson	United States	2 yds behind	Q
3	Otto Bock	Denmark	Unknown	
4	Sidney Abrahams	Great Britain	Unknown	
5	Bohuslav Pohl-Polenský	Bohemia	Unknown	

==== Semifinal 2 ====
Rank	Athlete	Nation	Time	Notes
1	Fay Moulton	United States	11.2	Q
2	Knut Lindberg	Sweden	1½ yds behind	Q
3	William Schick	United States	Unknown	

==== Semifinal 3 ====
Rank	Athlete	Nation	Time	Notes
1	William Eaton	United States	11.6	Q
2	Nigel Barker	Australia	1 yd behind	Q
3	Wyndham Halswelle	Great Britain	Unknown	
4	Axel Ljung	Sweden	Unknown	
5	Gaspare Torretta	Italy	Unknown	
6	Alfred Healey	Great Britain	Unknown	

=== Final ===
Rank	Athlete	Nation	Time	Notes
1st place, gold medalist(s)	Archie Hahn	United States	11.2	
2nd place, silver medalist(s)	Fay Moulton	United States	11.3	1 yd behind 1st
3rd place, bronze medalist(s)	Nigel Barker	Australia	11.3	1 ft behind 2nd
4	William Eaton	United States	11.4	1½ yds behind 3rd
5	Lawson Robertson	United States	11.4	No distance behind 4th
6	Knut Lindberg	Sweden	11.5	1 yd behind 5th
