= Königsgarten (disambiguation) =

- Ernst Königsgarten (1880–1942), Austrian businessman and fencer
- Hugo Königsgarten (1904–1975), British-Austrian composer and author
- Königsgarten may also refer to Königsberg, former German city, now Kaliningrad
