= Paul Guenther =

Paul Guenther may refer to:

- Paul Guenther (American football) (born 1971), American football coach
- Paul Günther (1882–1959), German diver
