= Nylund (disambiguation) =

Nylund may refer to:

- Nylund, a neighborhood (delområde) in the borough Storhaug in Stavanger, Norway
- Nylund, a surname of Scandinavian origin meaning "new grove"

== People ==
- Lindsay Nylund (born 1958), Australian gymnast
- Camilla Nylund (born 1968), Finnish soprano
- Eric Nylund (born 1964), American science fiction author
- Gary Nylund (born 1963), Canadian hockey player
- Mattias Nylund (born 1980), Swedish soccer player
- Olav Kjetilson Nylund (1903–1957), Norwegian politician
- Ossian Nylund, Finnish track and field athlete
- Sven Nylund (1894–1975), Swedish diver

== Other ==
- Rose Nylund, fictional character on the situation comedy, The Golden Girls
