= Jérome Hicketick =

Belgian diver

Personal information
- Nationality: Belgian
- Born: November 16, 1881 Antwerp, Belgium
- Died: June 9, 1948 Antwerp, Belgium

Sport
- Sport: Diving

Jérome Arthur Hicketick (born 16 November 1881 in Antwerp, Belgium, deceased 9 June 1948 in Antwerp, Belgium) was a Belgian diver. He competed in the men's 10 metre platform event at the 1908 Summer Olympics.
