= Hjalmar Johansson =

Swedish sportsman (1874–1957)

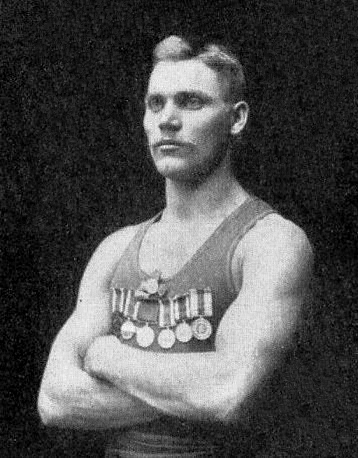

Personal information
- Born: 20 January 1874 Karlskrona, Sweden
- Died: 30 September 1957 (aged 83) Segeltorp, Sweden
- Height: 1.70 m (5 ft 7 in)
- Weight: 76 kg (168 lb)

Sport
- Sport: Diving, swimming, athletics
- Club: IK Atle, Stockholm; Stockholms KK
Medal record
Representing Sweden
Olympic Games
Gold medal – first place	1908 London	10 metre platform
Silver medal – second place	1912 Stockholm	Plain high diving

Carl Hjalmar August Johansson (20 January 1874 – 30 September 1957) was a Swedish pioneer diver and swimmer who competed at the 1908 and 1912 Summer Olympics.

== Biography ==
Johansson was 32 years old when he competed in three different events at the 1906 Intercalated Games, firstly he entered the 100 m freestyle swimming, where he came fourth in his heat so qualifying for the final the next day, in the final there was nine swimmers and Johansson finished eighth, the same day he competed in the standing long jump event and jumped 2.690 metres to finish 19th out of 30. Finally he competed in his favoured event the combined platform diving event, where he finished in sixth place out of 24 divers.

Two years later at the 1908 Summer Olympics he won a gold medal in the 10 m diving platform beating three other Swedish divers and an American in the final, and was eliminated in the heats of 200 m breaststroke. Johansson also rescued a fellow diver who passed out after hitting the water poorly.

In 1912, aged 38, he won a silver medal in the plain high diving finishing behind fellow Swede Erik Adlerz who was just 19 years old, he also finished fourth in the 10 m platform.

Johansson significantly contributed to designing the Olympic code for conduct of diving competitions. He also invented diving styles, such as the "Swedish Swallow". He won the Swedish diving title from 1897 to 1912, except for two years when he was studying in London, and the British title from 1907 to 1913. In 1982 he was inducted into the International Swimming Hall of Fame as an honor diver/contributor.

== See also ==
- List of members of the International Swimming Hall of Fame
- Dual sport and multi-sport Olympians
