= Ralph Errington =

British diver

Personal information
- Born: September 21, 1886; Marylebone, Great Britain
- Died: April 4, 1958 (aged 71); Gaddesby, Great Britain

Sport
- Sport: Diving

Ralph Errington (21 September 1886 – 4 April 1958) was a British diver who competed in the 1908 Summer Olympics. In 1908 he was eliminated in the semi-finals of the 3 metre springboard competition after finishing fifth in his heat.
