= Herbert Pott =

British diver

Personal information
- Born: January 15, 1883; Richmond, London, Great Britain
- Died: May 9, 1953 (aged 70); Saanich, British Columbia, Canada

Sport
- Sport: Diving

Herbert Ernest Pott (15 January 1883 – 9 May 1953) was a British diver who competed in the 1908 Summer Olympics and in the 1912 Summer Olympics. He was born in Richmond, London.

In 1908 he was eliminated in the semi-finals of the 3 metre springboard competition after finishing third in his heat. Four years later he finished sixth in the 3 metre springboard event.
