= Charles Cross (diver) =

British diver (1887–1963)

Personal information
- Nationality: British
- Born: 1887
- Died: 1963 (aged 75–76)

Sport
- Sport: Diving

Charles Cross (1887 – 1963) was a British diver. He competed in the men's 3 metre springboard event at the 1908 Summer Olympics.
