= Gösta Sjöberg =

Swedish diver

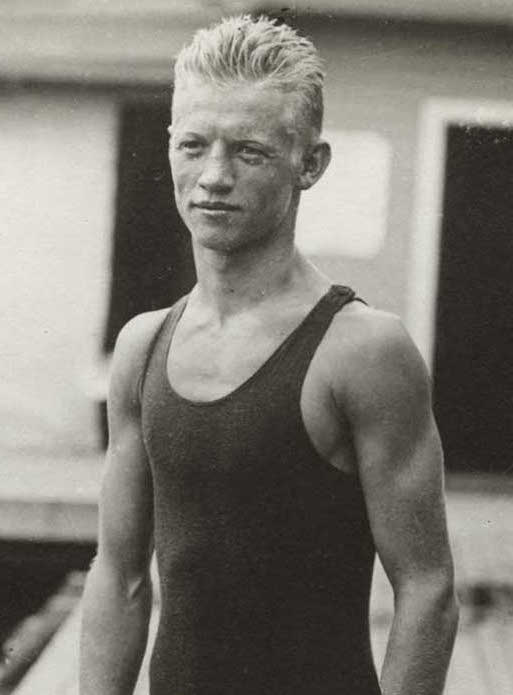

Personal information
- Born: 6 March 1896 Ravlunda, Simrishamn, Sweden
- Died: 26 November 1968 (aged 72) Farsta, Stockholm, Sweden

Sport
- Sport: Diving
- Club: Malmö SS

Gösta Gabriel Sjöberg (6 March 1896 – 26 November 1968) was a Swedish diver who competed in the 1912 Summer Olympics. He finished fourth in his heat of the 10 m platform event and did not advance to the final.
