= George Cane =

British diver (1881–1968)

Personal information
- Nationality: British
- Born: 21 October 1881 London, Great Britain
- Died: 21 September 1968 (aged 86) Southend-on-Sea, Great Britain

Sport
- Sport: Diving

George Cane (21 October 1881 – 21 September 1968) was a British diver. He competed in the men's 10 metre platform event at the 1908 Summer Olympics.
