= Thomas Harrington (diver) =

British diver

Personal information
- Nationality: British
- Born: Southwark, London, Great Britain

Sport
- Sport: Diving

Thomas Harrington was a British diver. He competed in the men's 10 metre platform event at the 1908 Summer Olympics.
