= Alvin Carlsson =

Swedish diver

Personal information
- Born: September 25, 1891 Malmö, Sweden
- Died: October 26, 1972 (aged 81) Malmö, Sweden

Sport
- Sport: Diving

Alvin Carlsson (25 September 1891 – 26 October 1972) was a Swedish diver who competed in the 1912 Summer Olympics. He finished seventh in the 10 metre platform competition.

Carlsson represented Malmö S.
