= Eskil Brodd =

Swedish diver

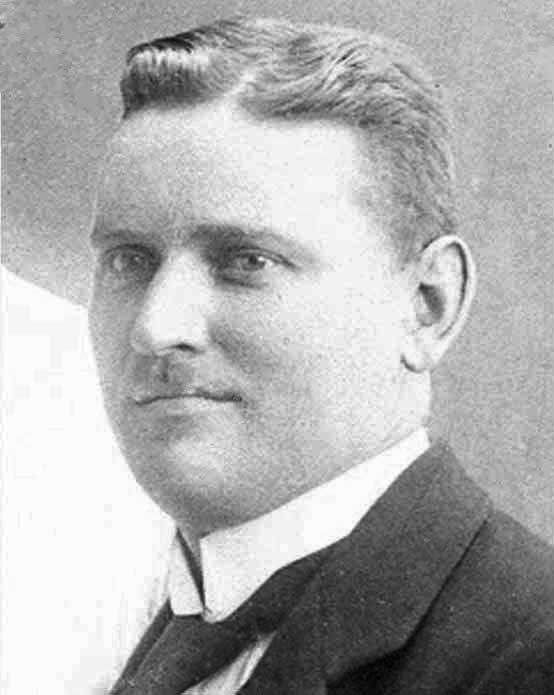

Personal information
- Born: 28 August 1885 Bälinge, Uppsala, Sweden
- Died: 2 October 1969 (aged 84) Täby, Stockholm, Sweden

Sport
- Sport: Diving
- Club: Upsala SS

Eskil Augustus Brodd (28 August 1885 – 2 October 1969) was a Swedish diver who competed in the 1912 Summer Olympics. He finished sixth in a heat of the 3 m springboard event and did not advance to the final.
