= William Bull (diver) =

British diver

Personal information
- Nationality: British
- Born: 1886; Hackney, London, Great Britain
- Died: 1970 (aged 83–84)

Sport
- Sport: Diving

William Bull (1886 – 1970) was a British diver. He competed in the men's 3 metre springboard event at the 1908 Summer Olympics.
