= James Aldous =

British diver

Personal information
- Nationality: British
- Born: 7 August 1882; London, England
- Died: 31 January 1975 (aged 92); London, England

Sport
- Sport: Diving

James Aldous (7 August 1882 – 31 January 1975) was a British diver. He competed in the men's 10 metre platform event at the 1908 Summer Olympics.
