= William Webb (diver) =

British diver

Personal information
- Nationality: British
- Born: 21 June 1862 London, Great Britain
- Died: Unknown

Sport
- Sport: Diving

William Webb (born 21 June 1862, date of death unknown) was a British diver. He competed in the men's 10 metre platform event at the 1908 Summer Olympics.
