= Fritz Nicolai =

German diver

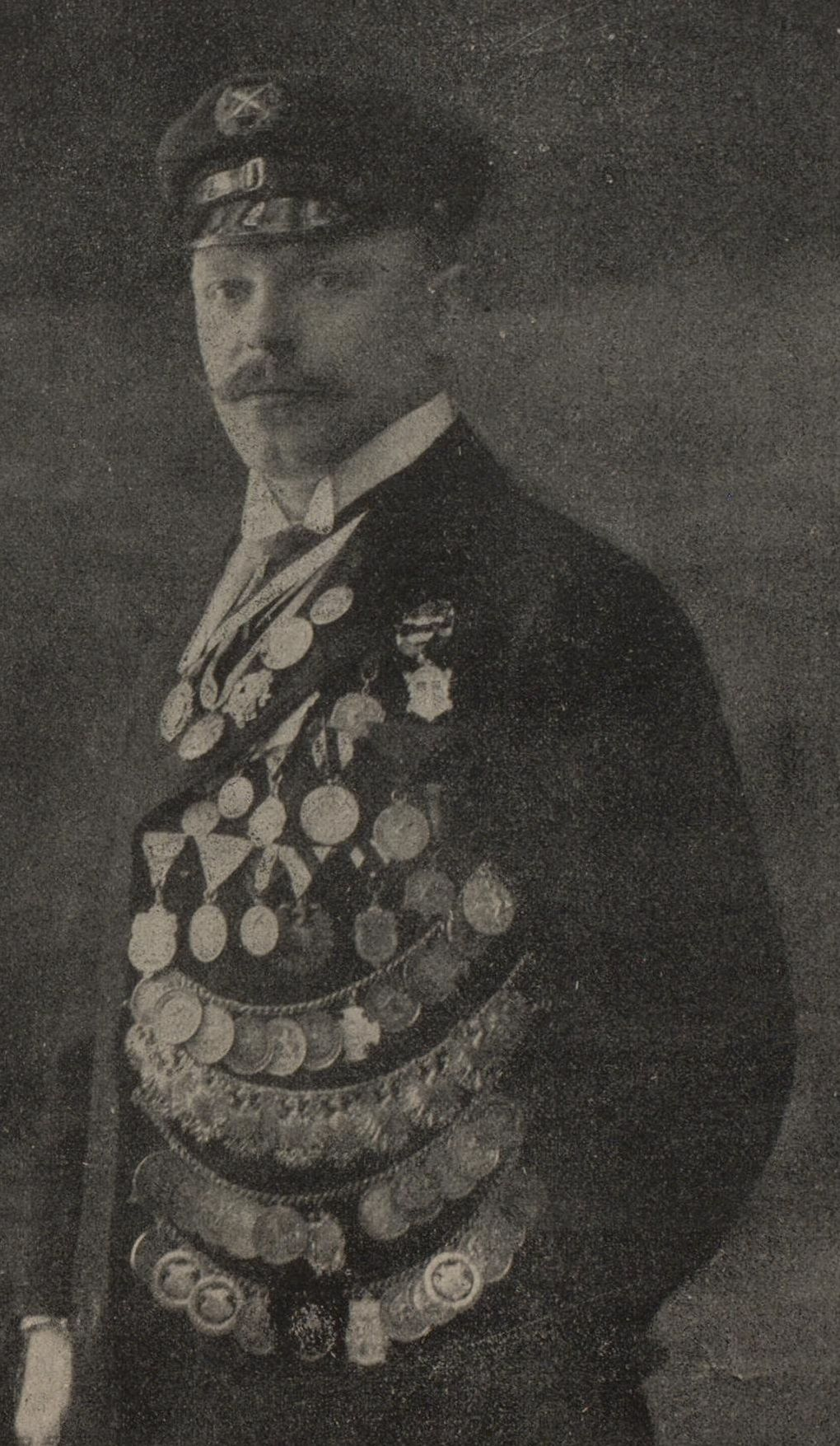

Personal information
- Born: December 11, 1879; Frankfurt, German Empire
- Died: March 7, 1946 (aged 66); Bensheim, Germany

Sport
- Sport: Diving

Friedrich "Fritz" Nicolai (11 December 1879 – 7 March 1946) was a German diver who competed in the 1906 Summer Olympics and in the 1908 Summer Olympics. In 1906 he finished eighth in the 10 metre platform competition.

Two years later, at the 1908 Olympics, he was eliminated in the semi-finals of the 3 metre springboard event after finishing third in his heat. In the 10 metre platform competition he was eliminated in the first round.
