= George Yvon =

British diver

Personal information
- Born: February 15, 1887 Saint-Brieuc, France
- Died: November 20, 1957 (aged 70) Saint Helier, Jersey, Great Britain

Sport
- Sport: Diving

George Alexandre Yvon (February 15, 1887 – November 20, 1957) was a British diver who competed in the 1912 Summer Olympics. He was born in France, and died in Great Britain.

In 1912, he competed in both the men's 10 metre platform, in which he placed fifth, as well as the men's plain high events.
