= Emil Schön =

German fencer

Personal information
- Born: 4 August 1872 Jebenhausen, German Empire
- Died: 29 November 1945 (aged 73) Frankfurt, Allied-occupied Germany

Sport
- Sport: Fencing
Medal record
Men's fencing
Representing Germany
Intercalated Games
Gold medal – first place	1906 Athens	Sabre, Team

Emil Schön (4 August 1872 – 29 November 1945) was a German fencer. He won a gold medal in the team sabre event at the 1906 Intercalated Games.
