= Albert Zürner =

German diver (1890–1920)

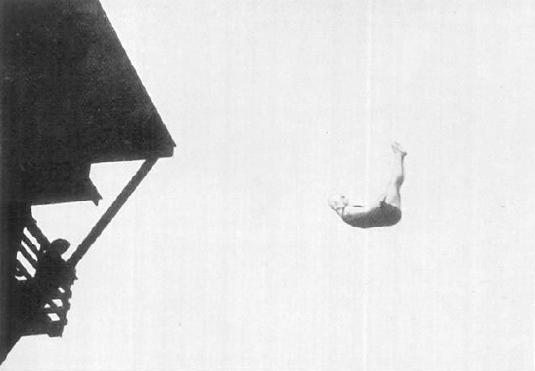
- Zürner at 1912 Summer Olympics

Personal information
- Born: 30 January 1890 Hamburg, German Empire
- Died: 18 July 1920 (aged 30) Bremen, Germany

Sport
- Sport: Diving
Medal record
Representing Germany
Olympic Games
Gold medal – first place	1908 London	3 metre springboard
Silver medal – second place	1912 Stockholm	10 metre platform

Albert Zürner (30 January 1890 – 18 July 1920) was a German diver who competed in the 1906 Summer Olympics, in the 1908 Summer Olympics, and in the 1912 Summer Olympics.

== Career ==
At the 1906 Intercalated Games in Athens, Zürner was the youngest member of the German team aged just 16 years and 87 days old, he competed in the platform diving event and finished fourth overall after nine dives from three different heights.

Two years later, Zürner was competing in the 3 metre springboard event at the 1908 Summer Olympics in London, after winning his heat and finishing second in his semi-final, he was in the final against two other German divers and an American, and on 18 July after seven dives Zürner was declared the winner, winning by 0.2 points from Kurt Behrens and receiving a gold medal.

Zürner competed in three events at the 1912 Summer Olympics in Stockholm, he tried to retain his 3 metre springboard but only managed to finish in fourth place, missing out on the bronze medal by 0.4 points to Kurt Behrens, he also entered the plain high diving event, but only managed sixth place in his heat so did not qualify for the final. Zürner's best event at these Games was in the 10 metre platform event, where he won the silver medal, finishing behind Swedish diver Erik Adlerz by 1.34 points.

Twelve years to the day after he won his gold medal, Zürner died in a diving accident while training for an event to be held in Bremen on 18 July 1920.

In 1988, Zürner was inducted into the International Swimming Hall of Fame.
