= Viktor Crondahl =

Swedish diver

Personal information
- Born: April 5, 1887; Karlskrona, Sweden
- Died: January 8, 1953 (aged 65); Seattle, Oregon, United States

Sport
- Sport: Diving

Viktor Gustaf Crondahl (April 5, 1887 – January 8, 1953) was a Swedish diver who competed in the 1912 Summer Olympics.

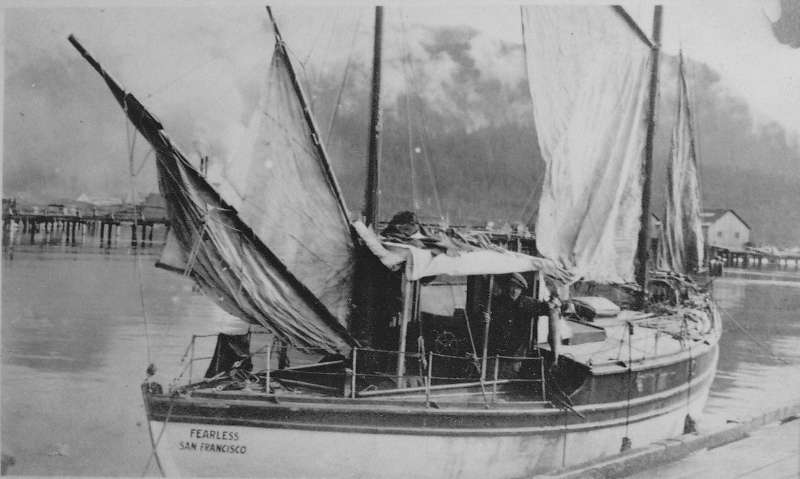
Victor Crondahl aboard Fearless

Viktor finished fourth in the plain high diving competition during the 1912 Summer Olympics in Stockholm, Sweden.
