= Torsten Eriksson =

Swedish diver

Personal information
- Nationality: Swedish
- Born: 20 February 1891; Örebro, Sweden
- Died: 29 July 1979 (aged 88); Örebro, Sweden

Sport
- Sport: Diving

Torsten Eriksson (20 February 1891 – 29 July 1979) was a Swedish diver. He competed in the men's plain high diving event at the 1912 Summer Olympics.
