= Harry Crank =

British diver

Personal information
- Nationality: British
- Born: November 1890 Bolton, England
- Died: 22 October 1917 (aged 26) Ypres, Belgium

Sport
- Sport: Diving

Harry Crank (November 1890 – 22 October 1917) was a British diver. He competed in the men's 3 metre springboard event at the 1908 Summer Olympics. He was killed in action during the First World War.

== Personal life ==
Crank served as a second lieutenant in the Lancashire Fusiliers during the First World War. He was killed in action on 22 October 1917 in Belgium. His body was never recovered, and he is commemorated at Tyne Cot Memorial.

== See also ==
- List of Olympians killed in World War I
