= Theodor Scheidl =

Austrian baritone and athlete (1880–1959)

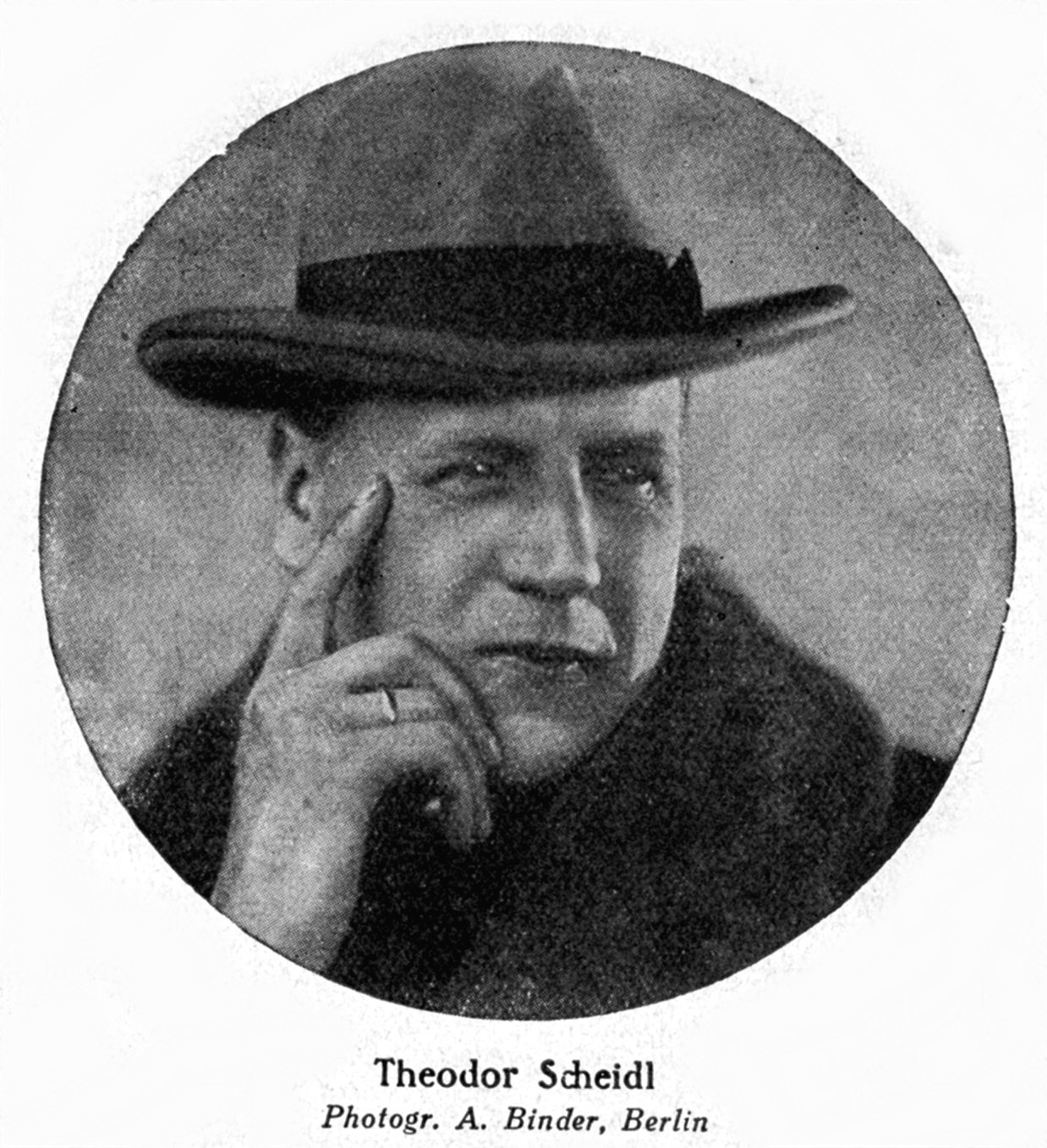
- Scheidl in a 1925 Berliner Staatsoper booklet
- Born: 3 August 1880; Vienna, Austria-Hungary
- Died: 22 April 1959 (aged 78); Tübingen, West Germany
- Occupations: Athlete; Operatic baritone; Academic voice teacher
- Organizations: Staatstheater Stuttgart; Berliner Staatsoper; Musikhochschule München

Theodor Scheidl (3 August 1880 – 22 April 1959) was an Austrian baritone, athlete, and academic teacher. He performed leading roles with opera houses in Stuttgart and Berlin,and appeared at major international venues and festivals, including the Bayreuth Festival, where he sang from 1914 to 1928. Scheidl also created roles in several world premieres, notably Young Columbus in Darius Milhaud's Christophe Colomb.

== Life ==
Born in Vienna, Scheidl was the head cashier of the Austrian Medizinal-Drogen-AG for ten years following his schooling. He participated in the 1906 Intercalated Games and was active in track and field as high jumper, long-jumper and discus thrower, as swimmer and as gymnast. At the 1906 Olympic Games in Athens, he took part in the pentathlon, coming in ninth, and 13th in the standing long jump. His rankings in high jump and discus throw (Greek style) are not handed down and in standing long jump he was disqualified.

In 1906, Scheidl began to study voice with Alois Grienauer. He made his debut in 1910 at the Wiener Volksoper as the Heerrufer in Wagner's Lohengrin. Engagements at the Mährisches Theater Olmütz, the Staatstheater Augsburg and the Staatstheater Stuttgart followed. He worked in Stuttgart from 1913 to 1921. He performed there in several world premieres, in 1913 in Ulenspiegel by Walter Braunfels, in 1917 in Siegfried Wagner's An allem ist Hütchen schuld!, and in 1919 in Ture Rangström's Die Kronenbraut (The Crown Bride).

From 1921 to 1932, Scheidl was a member of the Berliner Staatsoper, He appeared in world premieres again, in 1922 in Franz Schmidt's Fredigundis, 1928 in Franz Schreker's Der singende Teufel, and in 1928 as the Young Columbus in Darius Milhaud's Christophe Colomb. Afterwards he worked at the State Opera in Prague.

Scheidl appeared at the Bayreuth Festival first in 1914, as Klingsor in Parsifal and Donner in Das Rheingold. He returned in 1924 to appear as Amfortas in Parsifal, repeated in 1925 and 1928, and was Kurwenal in Tristan und Isolde in 1927. He appeared as a guest at the Royal Swedish Opera in Stockholm, the Dutch National Opera in Amsterdam, La Scala in Milan, and the Vienna State Opera, among others.

Scheidl retired from the stage in 1937 and then taught at the Musikhochschule München. From 1944, he was a voice teacher in Tübingen. He appeared on stage occasionally, notably as Scarpia in Puccini's Tosca at the Stuttgart Opera in 1955, to celebrate his 75th birthday.

Scheidl died in Tübingen at the age of 78.
