= Hilmer Löfberg =

Swedish diver

Personal information
- Born: July 22, 1887 Stockholm, Sweden
- Died: July 23, 1940 (aged 53) Borlänge, Sweden

Sport
- Sport: Diving

Hilmer Löfberg (22 July 1887 – 23 July 1940) was a Swedish diver who competed in the 1908 Summer Olympics. In 1908 he was eliminated in the semi-finals of the 10 metre platform event.

Löfberg represented Stockholms KK.
