= Heinz Freyschmidt =

German diver

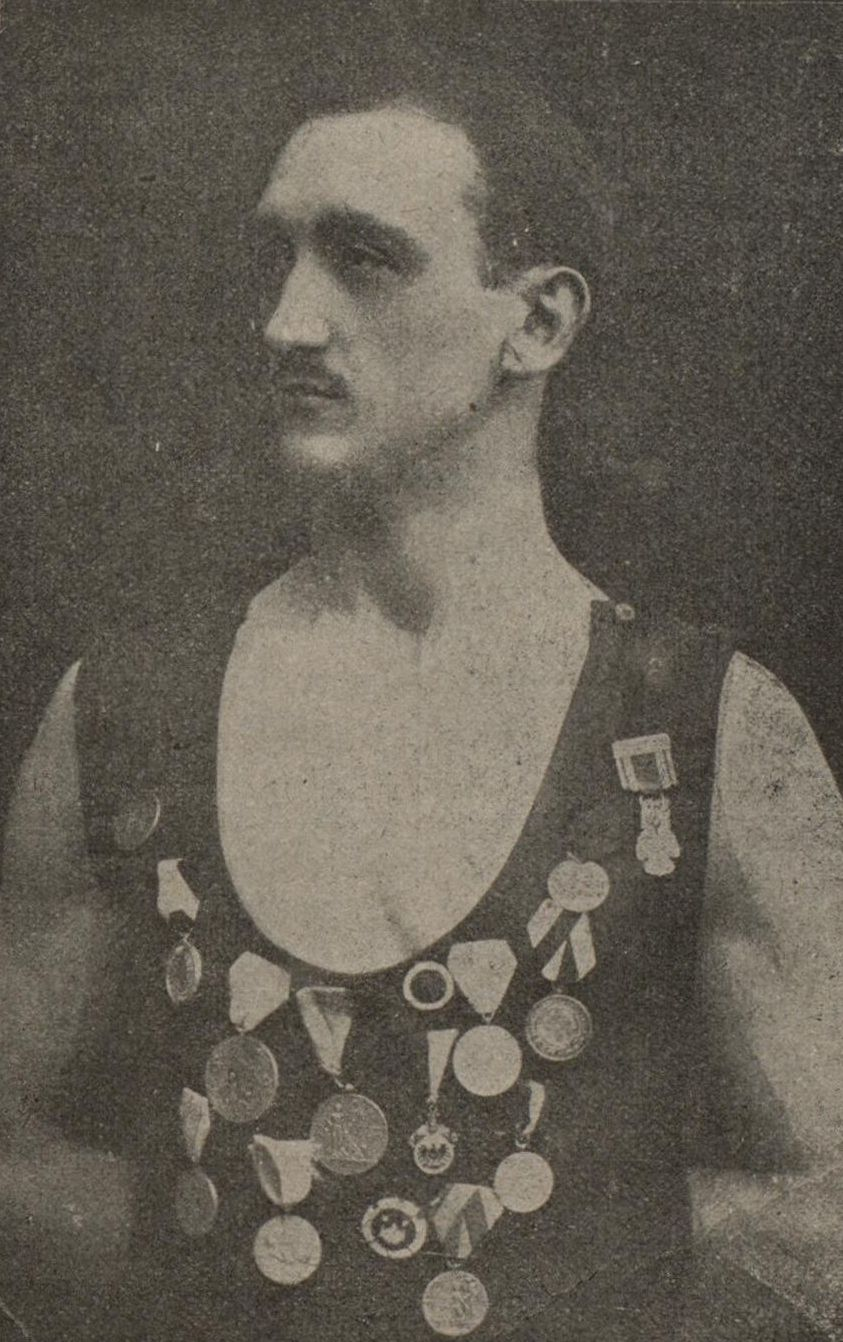

Personal information
- Born: July 20, 1887; Cologne, German Empire

Sport
- Sport: Diving

Heinrich "Heinz" Freyschmidt (born July 20, 1887, date of death unknown) was a German diver who competed in the 1908 Summer Olympics. In 1908 he was eliminated in the semi-finals of the 3 metre springboard event after finishing fourth in his heat. In the 10 metre platform competition he was eliminated in the semi-finals after finishing fifth in his heat.
