= Otto Satzinger =

Austrian diver

Personal information
- Born: 21 July 1878 Vienna, Austria
- Died: 6 May 1945 (aged 66)

Sport
- Country: Austrian Empire
- Sport: Diving
Medal record
Bronze medal – third place	1906 Athens	10 metre platform

Otto Satzinger (21 July 1878 – 6 May 1945) was an Austrian diver who won a bronze medal at the 1906 Intercalated Games in the platform event.

Satzinger represented Austria at the 1906 Intercalated Games in Athens, he competed in the platform diving event, where he and 23 other divers from six other countries had nine dives from three different heights, the five judges gave Satzinger 147.4 points and so finished third behind the two Germans Gottlob Walz and Georg Hoffmann.

Satzinger won the Austrian National Diving Championship at least seven times.
