= Jack Lyons (diver) =

Canadian diver

Personal information
- Born: August 31, 1873; Liverpool, Great Britain
- Died: November 24, 1956 (aged 83); Montreal, Canada

Sport
- Sport: Diving

John Patrick Lyons (31 August 1873 – 24 November 1956) was a Canadian diver who competed in the 1912 Summer Olympics. He was born in Liverpool, England.

In 1912, he competed in both the men's 10 metre platform and men's plain high events.
