= Sven Montan =

Swedish diver

Personal information
- Nationality: Swedish
- Born: 22 July 1887; Stockholm, Sweden
- Died: 29 May 1971 (aged 83); Stockholm, Sweden

Sport
- Sport: Diving

Sven Montan (22 July 1887 – 29 May 1971) was a Swedish diver. He competed in the men's plain high diving event at the 1912 Summer Olympics.
