= Josef Krämer =

German athlete

- Born: 19 March 1879 Ückendorf, German Empire
- Died: 25 July 1946 (aged 67) Gelsenkirchen, Allied-occupied Germany

Gymnastics career
- Discipline: Men's artistic gymnastics
- Country represented: Germany
- Gym: Turnverein Ückendorf
Medal record
Tug of war
Representing Germany
Intercalated Games
Gold medal – first place	1906 Athens	Tug of war

Josef Krämer (March 19, 1879 – July 25, 1946) was a German gymnast, track and field athlete, and tug of war competitor who competed in the 1906 Summer Olympics and in the 1908 Summer Olympics. He was born in Gelsenkirchen.

In 1906, he was part of the German team that won the gold medal in the tug-of-war competition. He also participated in the high jump event, but his result is unknown.

As a member of the German gymnastics team, he finished fifth in the team event. In the individual all-around of five events he finished seventh, and in the individual all-around of six events he finished twelfth. Two years later, at the 1908 Olympics, he participated in the individual gymnastics all-around, but his result was unknown.
