= Tore Nylund =

Swedish diver

Personal information
- Born: October 5, 1894 Stockholm, Sweden
- Died: July 2, 1975 (aged 80) Vadstena, Sweden

Sport
- Sport: Diving

Sven Tore Nylund (5 October 1894 – 2 July 1975) was a Swedish diver who competed in the 1912 Summer Olympics. He finished fifth in his first round heat of the 3 metre springboard event and did not advance to the final.
