= Erik Tjäder =

Swedish diver

Personal information
- Born: May 18, 1863; Stockholm, Sweden
- Died: April 9, 1949 (aged 85); Stockholm, Sweden

Sport
- Sport: Diving

Erik Tjäder (18 May 1863 – 9 April 1949) was a Swedish diver who competed in the 1912 Summer Olympics. He finished seventh in his first round heat of the 3 metre springboard event and was not advanced to the final.

Tjäder represented Stockholms KK.
