= Alfred Johansson (diver) =

Swedish diver (1876–1941)

Personal information
- Nationality: Swedish
- Born: 8 May 1876; Stockholm, Sweden
- Died: 28 March 1941 (aged 64); Stockholm, Sweden

Sport
- Sport: Diving

Johan Alfred Emmanuel Johansson (8 May 1876 – 28 March 1941) was a Swedish diver. He competed in the men's plain high diving event at the 1912 Summer Olympics.

Johansson represented Stockholms KK.
