= Hans Luber =

German diver (1893–1940)

Personal information
- Born: October 15, 1892 Schongau, Bavaria, German Empire
- Died: October 15, 1940 (aged 47) Berlin, Germany

Sport
- Sport: Diving
Medal record
Representing Germany
Olympic Games
Silver medal – second place	1912 Stockholm	3 m springboard
European Championships
Gold medal – first place	1926 Budapest	3 m springboard
Gold medal – first place	1927 Bologna	Platform

Johann "Hans" Luber (15 October 1892 – 15 October 1940) was a German diver who competed in the 1912 Summer Olympics. He won the silver medal in the 3 metre springboard event. In the plain high diving as well as in the 10 metre platform competition, he was eliminated in the first round.
