= Ernst Eklund (diver) =

Swedish diver

Personal information
- Born: July 22, 1894; Stockholm, Sweden
- Died: May 5, 1952 (aged 57); Los Angeles, California, United States

Sport
- Sport: Diving

Ernst Rudolf "Stumpen" Eklund (22 July 1894 – 5 May 1952) was a Swedish diver who competed in the 1912 Summer Olympics.

He finished third in his first round heat of the 3 metre springboard event and did not advance to the final. He also competed in the 10 metre platform event. Here he finished fourth in his first round heat and did not advance to the final again.

Eklund represented Stockholms KK.
