= Martin Harden =

Austrian fencer

Personal information
- Born: 25 February 1876 Brăila, Kingdom of Romania
- Died: 18 July 1968 (aged 92) Monte Carlo, Monaco

Sport
- Sport: Fencing

Martin Harden (25 February 1876 – 18 July 1968) was a fencer. He competed for Austria at the 1906 Summer Olympics and for Czechoslovakia at the 1928 Summer Olympics.
