= Gustaf Blomgren =

Swedish diver

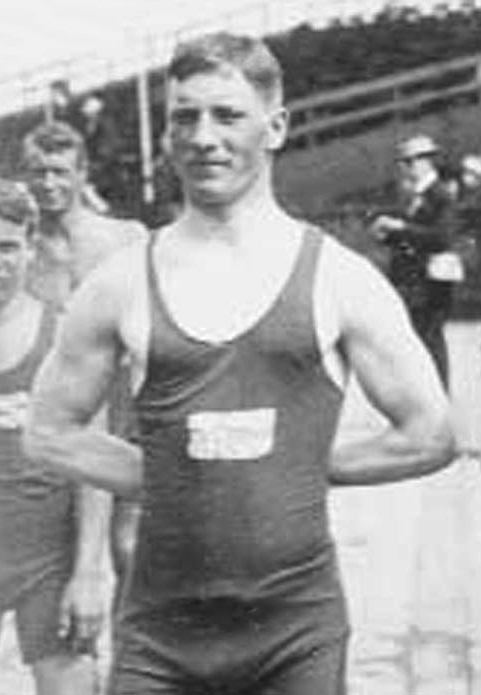

Personal information
- Born: 24 December 1887 Gothenburg, Sweden
- Died: 25 July 1956 (aged 68) Gothenburg, Sweden

Sport
- Sport: Diving
- Club: Simklubben S02, Göteborg; SK Delfin, Göteborg
Medal record
Representing Sweden
Olympic Games
Bronze medal – third place	1912 Stockholm	10 m platform

Gustaf Adolf Viktor Blomgren (24 December 1887 – 25 July 1956) was a Swedish diver who competed in the 1912 and 1920 Summer Olympics. In 1912 he won the bronze medal in the 10 m platform. Eight years later, he finished fourth in the 3 m springboard and in the 10 m platform events. During his diving career, Blomgren won five Swedish titles in the springboard and platform. He worked for the Gothenburg tram services.
