= Arvid Spångberg =

Swedish diver (1890–1959)

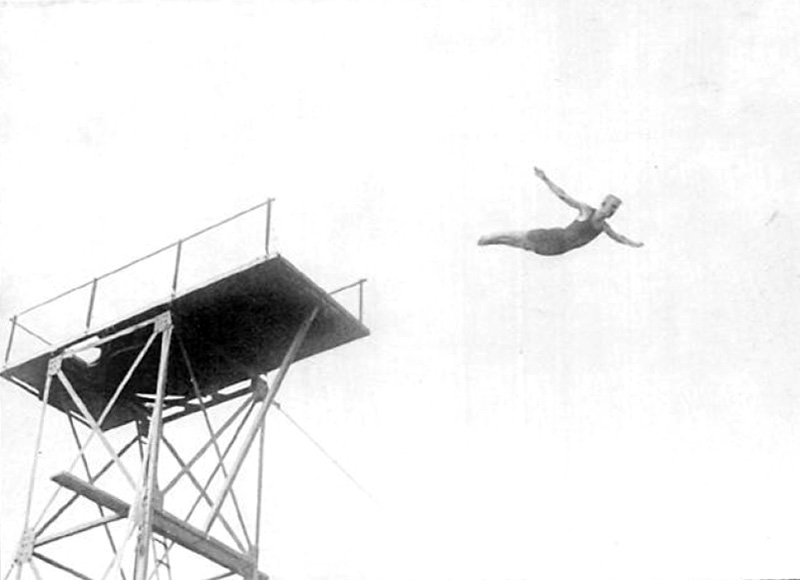
- Spångberg at the 1908 Olympics

Personal information
- Born: 3 April 1890 Stockholm, Sweden
- Died: 11 May 1959 (aged 69) New York City, United States

Sport
- Club: SK Neptun
Medal record
Men's Diving
Bronze medal – third place	1908 London	high diving

Arvid Fredrik "Sparven" Spångberg (3 April 1890 – 11 May 1959) was a Swedish Olympic bronze-medallist diver and bandy player. He competed in the 1908 Summer Olympics. He was born in Stockholm and died in New York City. He won the bronze medal in the 10 metre platform event. As a diver, Spångberg represented SK Neptun.

Arvid Spångberg also played football and bandy, representing Skeppsholmens IF and Djurgårdens IF. He played the 1908 Swedish bandy championship final with Djurgårdens IF Bandy against Östergötlands BF and was part winning Djurgården's first Swedish bandy championship.

== Honours ==
=== Club ===
Djurgårdens IF

- Svenska Mästerskapet: 1908
