= Leopold Mayer =

German swimmer

Personal information
- Nationality: Austrian
- Died: 21 September 1914 (aged 22)

Sport
- Sport: Swimming

Leopold Mayer (died 21 September 1914) was an Austrian swimmer. He competed in the men's one mile freestyle and the men's 250 metres starting relay at the 1906 Summer Olympics. He was killed in action during World War I.

== See also ==
- List of Olympians killed in World War I
