= Ernfrid Appelqvist =

Swedish diver

Personal information
- Born: 15 June 1888; Stockholm, Sweden
- Died: 26 January 1966 (aged 77); San Jose, California, United States

Sport
- Sport: Diving

Ernst Oscar Ernfrid Appelqvist (15 June 1888 – 26 January 1966), later known as Ernest Applequist, was a Swedish diver who competed in the 1912 Summer Olympics.

He finished fifth in his first round heat of the 3 metre springboard event and did not advance to the final. At club level, Appelqvist represented Stockholms KK.

A native of Stockholm, Applequist immigrated to the United States after the Olympics, living in Minnesota and New York. During World War II, he worked a night shift at the General Electric plant in Schenectady, New York, while each day broadcasting a 30-minute news program via shortwave radio to Sweden. "I would love to do anything can to sway the minds of the Swedish people away from the Nazis," he said in a 1942 interview.

Applequist later moved to San Jose, California, where he died in 1966.
