= Bernhard Abraham =

German gymnast

- Born: 1886

Gymnastics career
- Discipline: Men's artistic gymnastics
- Country represented: Germany
- Gym: Turngemeinde in Berlin 1848

Bernhard Abraham (1886–unknown) was a German gymnast. He competed in the 1906 Summer Olympics.
