= Axel Ljung =

Swedish artistic gymnast and athlete

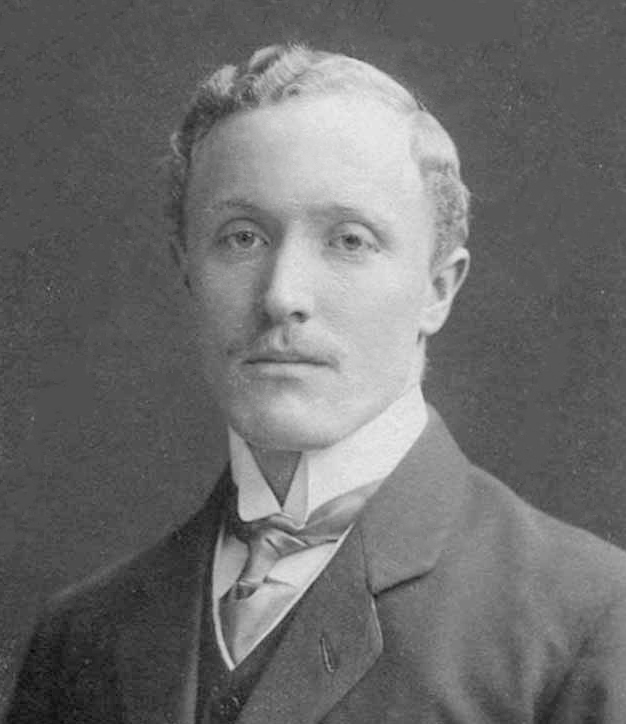
- Portrait of Ljung

Personal information
- Full name: Harald Axel Fredrik Ljung
- Born: 31 March 1884 Stockholm,
- Died: 5 February 1938 (aged 53) Stockholm, Sweden

Gymnastics career
- Discipline: Men's artistic gymnastics
- Country represented: Sweden
- Club: Stockholms Gymnastikförening; AIK
Medal record
Men's artistic gymnastics
Representing Sweden
Olympic Games
Gold medal – first place	1908 London	Team

Harald Axel Fredrik Ljung (31 March 1884 – 5 February 1938) was a Swedish gymnast and track and field athlete who won an all-around gold medal with the Swedish gymnastics team at the 1908 Summer Olympics. He also participated in the 100 m sprint, 100 m hurdles and standing long jump events at the 1906 Intercalated Games and finished fifth in the long jump. Ljung's personal bests in athletics were 11.3 in the 100 m (1904) and 16.0 in the 110 mH (1906).
