= Henry Grote =

American diver (1874–1947)

Personal information
- Nationality: American
- Born: August 28, 1874; Delligsen, Niedersachsen, Germany
- Died: January 21, 1947 (aged 72); Phoenix, Arizona, United States

Sport
- Sport: Diving

Henry Charles Grote (August 28, 1874 – January 21, 1947) was an American diver. He competed in the men's 3 metre springboard event at the 1908 Summer Olympics.

== Career ==
During the 1906 national swimming championships in Laughlin's Lake, Grote finished in third place, beating Frank Bornaman, who represented America during the 1896 Summer Olympics, and Dr. Sheldon, who was then the national indoor champion.

In 1908, while competing in western swimming tryouts in Chicago, he sustained an injury during a dive, which forced him to withdraw from the event. Grote made a difficult dive into a tank that was just 8 feet (2.4 m) deep instead of 12 feet (3.7 m) as necessitated by the rules, and as a result, he sustained a gash to his forehead and loosened several teeth. In the run-up to the 1908 Summer Olympics, Grote was not originally selected by the committee responsible for selection but was instead added to the reserve list, only being notified quite late that he could be entered at London if he could raise trip expenses of $325. With the help of friends, he raised around $180 from patrons of the Cherry Diamond Swimming Tank, while his swimming club offered to pay the remaining difference of $150, or else he may not have been able to participate. During the Olympics, he failed to qualify for the final trials and took a short trip around Germany after the games.
