= Gottlob Walz =

German diver

Personal information
- Born: June 29, 1881 Stuttgart, German Empire
- Died: 1943 (aged 61–62)

Sport
- Sport: Diving
Medal record
Representing Germany
Olympic Games
Bronze medal – third place	1908 London	3 metre springboard
Intercalated Games
Gold medal – first place	1906 Athens	10 metre platform

Gottlob Walz (29 June 1881 – 1943) was a German diver who competed in the 1906 Intercalated Games and 1908 Summer Olympics.

Walz was born in Stuttgart, Germany in 1881 and from 1903 became an accomplished diver who won the German National Diving Champion 11 times and the European Champion three times, so when he entered the Olympics he was the favorite each time.

At the 1906 Intercalated Games in Athens, he competed with another 23 divers in the platform diving event, in which the divers had three dives each from four, eight and twelve metre platforms, and after two days Walz won with 156.0 points and ahead of fellow German Georg Hoffmann by 5.8 points.

Two years later Walz was back at the Olympics competing this time in the 3 metre springboard event, at the 1908 Summer Olympics in London, in the first round the divers were split into group with the first two in each group qualifying for the next round, Walz won his group with 81.30 points, in the semi-finals there were two groups with again the top two qualifying for the final, Walz this time finished second in his group behind fellow German Kurt Behrens, in a final with four divers Walz only managed to finish in joint third place with American George Gaidzik.

== See also ==
- List of members of the International Swimming Hall of Fame
