= Sigfrid Larsson =

Swedish diver (1882–1968)

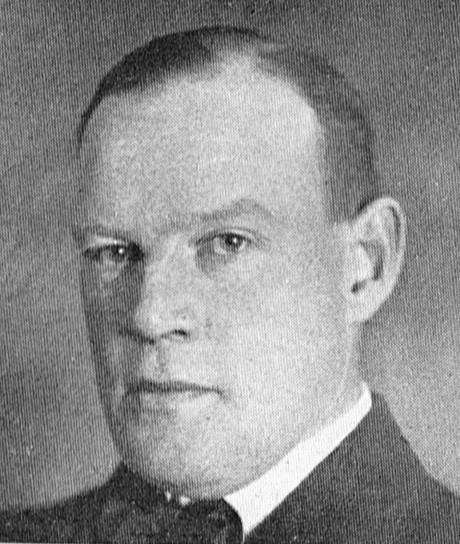

Personal information
- Full name: Sigfrid Daniel Larsson
- Nationality: Swedish
- Born: 1 January 1882; Stockholm, Sweden
- Died: 9 October 1968 (aged 86); Stockholm, Sweden

Sport
- Sport: Diving

Sigfrid Larsson (1 January 1882 – 9 October 1968) was a Swedish diver. He competed in two events at the 1908 Summer Olympics.

Larsson represented Stockholms KK.
