= Karl Malmström =

Swedish diver

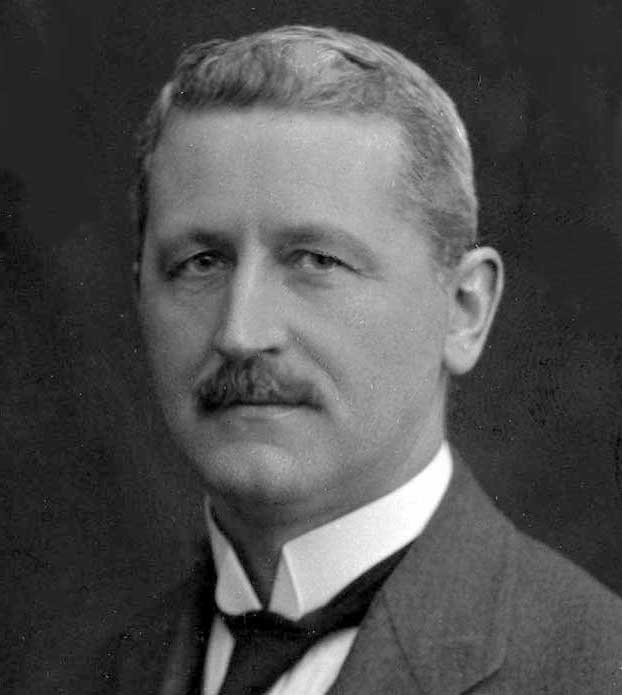

Personal information
- Born: 27 December 1875 Gothenburg, Sweden
- Died: 6 September 1938 (aged 62) Gothenburg, Sweden

Sport
- Sport: Diving
- Club: Simklubben S02, Göteborg
Medal record
Representing Sweden
Olympic Games
Silver medal – second place	1908 London	10 m platform

Karl Fritiof Malmström (27 December 1875 – 6 September 1938) was a Swedish diver. He competed at the 1908 Summer Olympics in the 3 m springboard and 10 m platform. He won the silver medal in the platform.
