= Sigvard Andersen =

Norwegian diver (1893–1975)

Personal information
- Nationality: Norwegian
- Born: 18 August 1893 Bergen, Norway
- Died: 31 March 1975 (aged 81)

Sport
- Sport: Diving

Sigvard Andersen (18 August 1893 – 31 March 1975) was a Norwegian diver. He was born in Bergen, and competed for the club BSC 1908. He participated at the 1912 Summer Olympics in Stockholm, in both platform and plain high. He also competed at the 1920 Summer Olympics in Antwerp.
