= Diving at the 1906 Intercalated Games =

At the 1906 Summer Olympics in Athens, only one event in diving was contested. Now called the Intercalated Games, the 1906 Games are no longer considered as an official Olympic Games by the International Olympic Committee.

== Medal summary ==
| Event | Gold | Silver | Bronze |
|---|---|---|---|
| 10 metre platform | Gottlob Walz; Germany | Georg Hoffmann; Germany | Otto Satzinger; Austria |

== Medal table ==
| Rank | Nation | Gold | Silver | Bronze | Total |
|---|---|---|---|---|---|
| 1 | Germany | 1 | 1 | 0 | 2 |
| 2 | Austria | 0 | 0 | 1 | 1 |
| Totals (2 entries) | | 1 | 1 | 1 | 3 |
