= Arthur McAleenan =

American diver

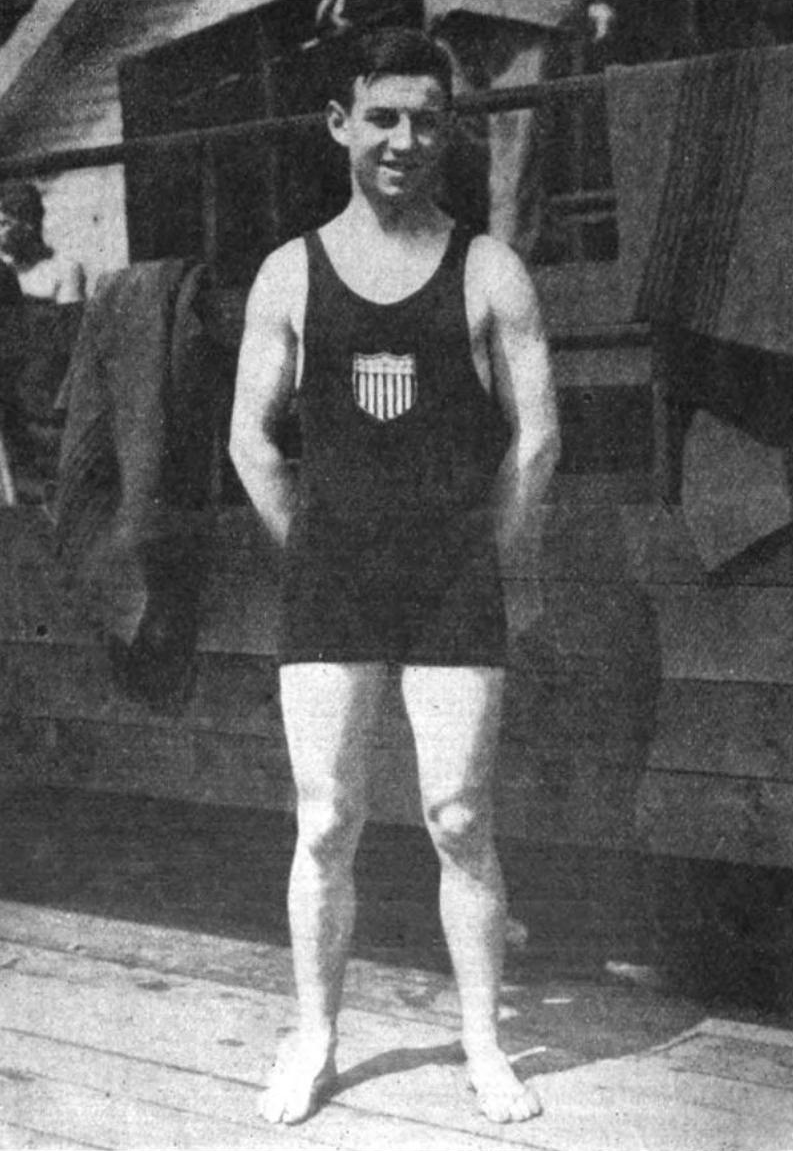
- McAleenan at the 1912 Summer Olympics

Personal information
- Born: October 15, 1894 New York, New York, United States
- Died: May 15, 1920 (aged 25) New York, New York, United States

Sport
- Sport: Diving

Arthur McAleenan (October 15, 1894 – May 15, 1920) was an American diver. He competed in three events at the 1912 Summer Olympics.

McAleenan died at Roosevelt Hospital on May 15, 1920, from injuries he suffered in a car accident on Long Island.
