= Vincent Duncker =

German hurdler

Medal record

Men's Athletics

Representing Germany

Intercalated Games
Bronze medal – third place	1906 Athens	110 metre hurdles

Vincent Duncker (9 November 1884 – unknown) was a German athlete who competed mainly in the 110 metre hurdles.

He competed for Germany in the 1906 Intercalated Games held in Athens, Greece in the 110 metre hurdles where he won the bronze medal.
