= Harald Arbin =

Swedish all-round athlete (1867–1944)

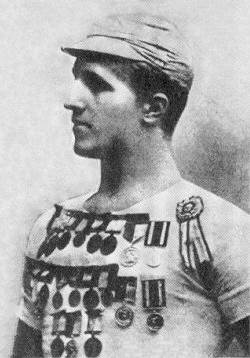
- Harald Arbin c. 1896

Personal information
- Born: 4 August 1867 Gothenburg, Sweden
- Died: 31 July 1944 (aged 76) Gothenburg, Sweden

Sport
- Sport: Athletics
- Event(s): 100 m, 200 m, discus throw, javelin throw
- Club: Simklubben S02, Göteborg

Achievements and titles
- Personal best(s): 100 m – 10.8 (1896); 200 m – 24.0 (1892); DT – 28.40 m (1894); JT – 42.95 m (1894)

Gustaf Harald Arbin (né Andersson, 4 August 1867 – 31 July 1944) was a Swedish diver, track and field athlete, and rower. He competed in diving (10 m platform) at the 1908 and 1912 Summer Olympics and finished sixth in 1912.

Arbin won Swedish titles in several track and field disciplines, including the 100 metres, 110 metres hurdles, long jump and javelin throw. He broke Swedish records in the 100 m (10.8 seconds), 200 metres (24 seconds) and the long jump (6.03 metres). His performance of 10.8 seconds for the 100 m, set in Helsingborg in 1896, ranked as an unofficial world record for the distance. This stood until 1906, when fellow Swede Knut Lindberg recorded a time of 10.6 seconds.
