= Paul Günther =

German diver

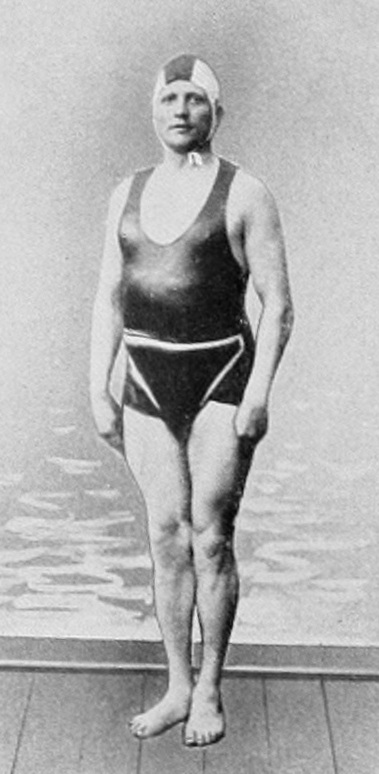
- Paul Günther at the 1912 Olympics

Personal information
- Born: 24 October 1882 Hannover, German Empire
- Died: 13 February 1959 (aged 76) Duisburg, West Germany

Sport
- Sport: Diving
- Club: Hannover 92
Medal record
Representing Germany
Summer Olympics
Gold medal – first place	1912 Stockholm	3 m springboard

Paul Günther (24 October 1882 – 13 February 1959) was a German diver who competed in the 1912 Summer Olympics. He won the gold medal in the 3 m springboard event. In the plain high diving, he competed in the final but did not finish, so he came eighth. In 1988 he was inducted to the International Swimming Hall of Fame.

== See also ==
- List of members of the International Swimming Hall of Fame
