= Johan Jansson =

Swedish diver (1892–1943)

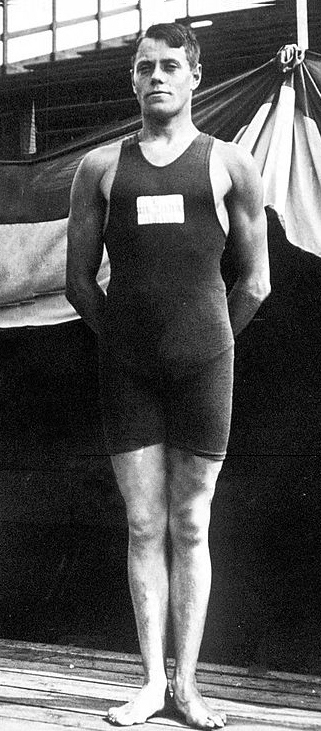
- John Jansson at the 1912 Olympics

Personal information
- Born: 18 July 1892 Stockholm, Sweden-Norway
- Died: 10 October 1943 (aged 51) Bromma, Sweden

Sport
- Sport: Diving
- Club: Stockholms KK
Medal record
Representing Sweden
Olympic Games
Silver medal – second place	1924 Paris	Plain high diving
Bronze medal – third place	1912 Stockholm	Plain high diving
Bronze medal – third place	1920 Antwerp	Plain high diving

Carl Johan Erik "John" Jansson (18 July 1892 – 10 October 1943) was a Swedish diver, who competed at the 1912, 1920 and 1924 Summer Olympics.

In the 1912 Olympics, he won a bronze medal in the plain high diving event, was seventh in the 3 metre springboard, and was eliminated in the 10 metre platform event heats. Eight years later, he won a bronze medal in the plain high diving event and was sixth in the 3 metre springboard. In 1924, he won a silver medal in the plain high diving event.
