= Kurt Behrens =

German diver (1884–1928)

Personal information
- Born: November 26, 1884 Magdeburg, German Empire
- Died: February 5, 1928 (aged 43) Berlin, Germany

Sport
- Sport: Diving
Medal record
Representing Germany
Olympic Games
Silver medal – second place	1908 London	3 metre springboard
Bronze medal – third place	1912 Stockholm	3 metre springboard

Kurt Edward Franz Behrens (26 November 1884 – 5 February 1928) was a German diver who competed in the 1908 Summer Olympics and in the 1912 Summer Olympics.

In 1908 he won the silver medal in the 3 metre springboard event. Four years later he won the bronze medal in the 3 metre springboard event. In the plain high diving as well as in the 10 metre platform competition he was eliminated in the first round.
