= Erik Adlerz =

Swedish diver (1892–1975)

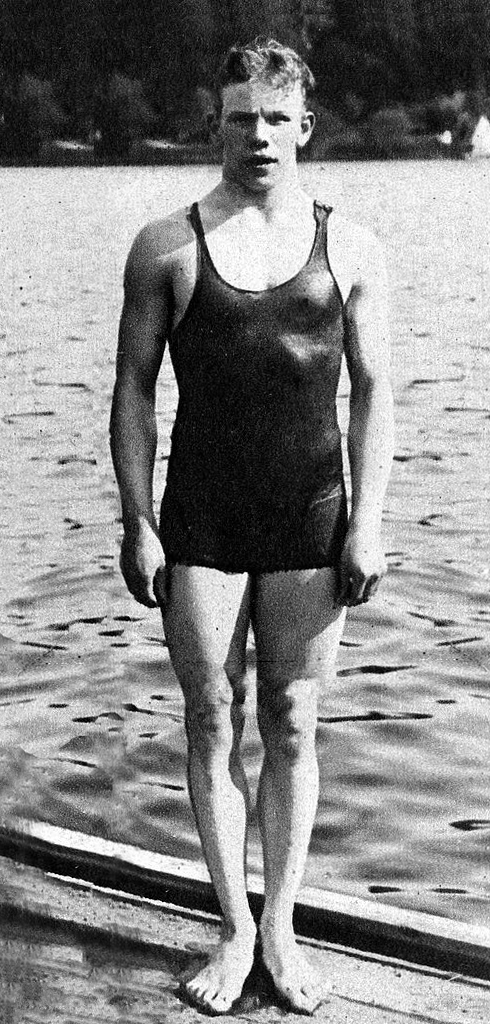
- Erik Adlerz at the 1920 Olympics

Personal information
- Nationality: Swedish
- Born: 23 July 1892 Stockholm, Sweden-Norway
- Died: 8 September 1975 (aged 83) Gothenburg, Sweden

Sport
- Country: Sweden
- Sport: Diving
- Club: Stockholms KK
Medal record
Men's diving
Representing Sweden
Summer Olympics
| Gold medal – first place | 1912 Stockholm | 10 m platform |
| Gold medal – first place | 1912 Stockholm | Plain high diving |
| Silver medal – second place | 1920 Antwerp | 10 m platform |

Erik Wilhelm "Loppan" Adlerz (23 July 1892 – 8 September 1975) was a Swedish diver who competed at the 1908, 1912, 1920 and 1924 Summer Olympics.

In 1908 he was eliminated in the first round in the 10 metre platform event. Four years later he won gold medals in the 10 m platform and plain high diving. In 1920 he won the silver medal in the 10 m platform; in the plain high diving event he finished fourth next to three Swedish teammates. In 1924 he finished fourth in the 10 m platform and failed to reach the final in the plain high diving.

He was the elder brother of Märta Adlerz, who competed in swimming at the 1912 Olympics. In 1986 he was inducted to the International Swimming Hall of Fame.

== See also ==
- List of members of the International Swimming Hall of Fame
