= George Gaidzik =

American diver (1885–1938)

Personal information
- Born: February 22, 1885 Chicago, United States
- Died: August 25, 1938 (aged 53) Lake Michigan

Sport
- Sport: Diving
Medal record
Representing the United States
Olympic Games
Bronze medal – third place	1908 London	3 metre springboard

George William Gaidzik (February 22, 1885 – August 25, 1938) was an American diver, who competed in the 1908 Summer Olympics and 1912 Summer Olympics. He was born in Chicago and died in a boat capsizing incident on Lake Michigan.

== Olympic career ==
In the 1908 Summer Olympics he won a bronze medal in the 3 metre springboard event and was fifth in the 10 metre platform event. Four years later, at the 1912 Summer Olympics, he was eighth in the 3 metre springboard event, was sixth in his first round heat in the 10 metre platform event and second in his first round heat in the Plain high diving event, and did not advance on both occasions.
