= Equestrian events at the 1912 Summer Olympics =

Equestrian at the Games of the V Olympiad
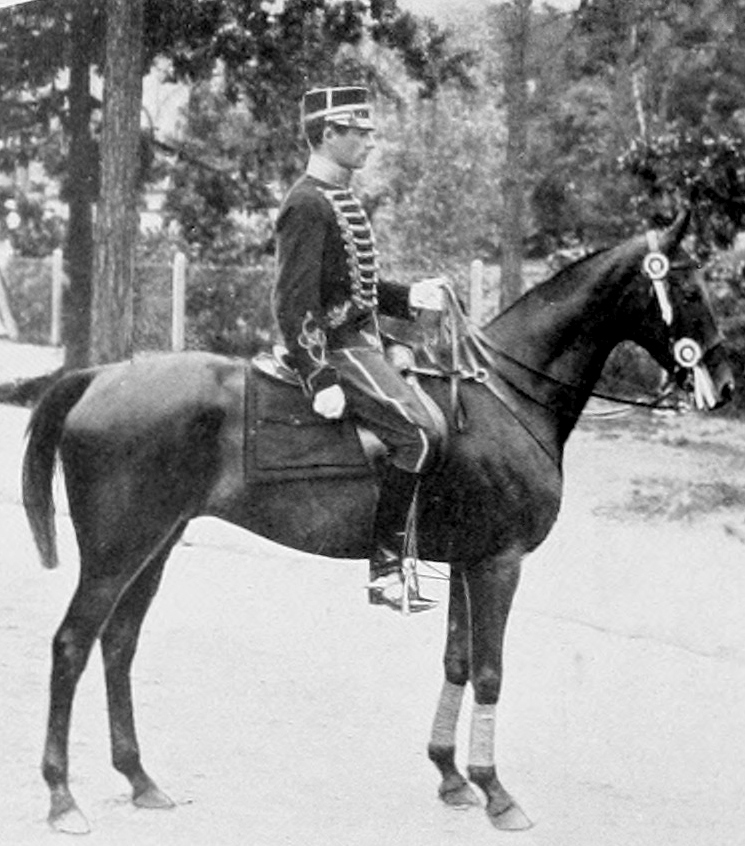
- Axel Nordlander, 1912 individual eventing gold medalist
- Venue: Fältrittklubben; Liljeholmen; Lindarängen; Östermalm Athletic Grounds; Stockholm Olympic Stadium
- Dates: 13–17 July 1912
- No. of events: 5
- Competitors: 62 from 10 nations

The equestrian program at the 1912 Summer Olympics in Stockholm, included five medal events. There were individual competitions in dressage, eventing, and show jumping. Team scores were also gathered and medals awarded for teams in the eventing and jumping competitions. Equestrian had been absent from the Olympic program since the 1900 Summer Olympics, making the 1912 Games the second time the sport was featured. Ten nations competed: Belgium, Chile, Denmark, France, Germany, Great Britain, Norway, Russia, Sweden, and the USA. Only Sweden and Germany were able to supply a full team for all three disciplines, with several countries (Belgium, Denmark, France, Great Britain, Norway and the USA) having several riders and horses used in two or even all three disciplines. A total of 88 entries ran in the three events, with 62 riders and 70 horses.

== Disciplines ==
=== Show jumping ===
A total of 40 riders from 8 nations contested the jumping event, which consisted of a 15-obstacle, 29-effort course. It had a maximum height of 1.40 meters and width of 4.00 meters, and had to be completes a speed of 400 m/min. Individual and team competitions ran over the same course but were held separately. A maximum of 6 riders per country was allowed in the individual jumping event.

=== Dressage ===
The dressage competition had 21 riders from 8 countries. It differed from the current format in that it did not include movements such as piaffe and passage but required five jumps up to 1.10 meters in height and a final obstacle: a barrel that had to be jumped while it was rolled towards the horse. Riders could garner bonus points for riding with one hand.

=== Eventing ===
The eventing competition had 7 nations competing with a total of 27 riders. The team event had 3 or 4 riders per nation, who were required to be officers on army mounts. The format differed greatly from what is currently used, being held over 5 days. The first day was a 55 km endurance ride to be completed in 4 hours, which included a 5 km, 12-obstacle cross-country course to be completed in 15 minutes. On the second day the horses were rested before coming out on the third day for a 3500m steeplechase over 10 obstacles, to be completed in 5min and 50 seconds. The fourth day was a jumping test, over a 15-obstacle course with a maximum height of 1.30 metes and 3.00 meters in width. The final day held the dressage test. Each phase could garner up to 10 points.

== Medal summary ==
Event	Gold	Silver	Bronze
Individual dressage	Carl Bonde on Emperor; Sweden	Gustaf Adolf Boltenstern on Neptun; Sweden	Hans von Blixen-Finecke on Maggie; Sweden
Individual eventing	Axel Nordlander on Lady Artist; Sweden	Friedrich von Rochow on Idealist; Germany	Jacques Cariou on Cocotte; France
Team eventing	Sweden; Axel Nordlander and Lady Artist; Nils Adlercreutz and Atout; Ernst Casparsson and Irmelin; Henric Horn af Åminne and Omen	Germany; Friedrich von Rochow and Idealist; Richard Graf von Schaesberg-Tannheim and Grundsee; Eduard von Lütcken and Blue Boy; Carl von Moers and May-Queen	United States; Ben Lear and Poppy; John Montgomery and Deceive; Guy Henry and Chiswell; Ephraim Graham and Connie
Individual jumping	Jacques Cariou on Mignon; France	Rabod von Kröcher on Dohna; Germany	Emmanuel de Blommaert on Clomore; Belgium
Team jumping	Sweden; Gustaf Lewenhaupt and Medusa; Gustaf Kilman and Gåtan; Hans von Rosen and Lord Iron; Fredrik Rosencrantz and Drabant	France; Pierre Dufour d'Astafort and Amazone; Jacques Cariou and Mignon; Ernest Meyer and Allons-y; Gaston Seigner and Cocotte	Germany; Sigismund Freyer and Ultimus; Wilhelm Graf von Hohenau and Pretty Girl; Ernst Deloch and Hubertus; Prince Friedrich Karl of Prussia and Gibson Boy

== Participating nations ==
A total of 62 riders from 10 nations competed at the Stockholm Games:

- Belgium (4)
- Chile (2)
- Denmark (4)
- France (4)
- Germany (13)
- Great Britain (4)
- Norway (3)
- Russia (7)
- Sweden (17)
- United States (4)

== Medal table ==
Rank	Nation	Gold	Silver	Bronze	Total
1	Sweden	4	1	1	6
2	France	1	1	1	3
3	Germany	0	3	1	4
4	Belgium	0	0	1	1
4	United States	0	0	1	1
Totals (5 entries)		5	5	5	15

== Officials ==
Appointment of officials was as follows:

Jumping

- (Sweden) Lt. Col. A.Adelswärd (Ground Jury President)
- (Sweden) Lt. Col. J. Akerman (Ground Jury Member)

Dressage

- (Sweden) Col. B. Cederström (Ground Jury President)
- (Sweden) Maj. W. Croneborg (Ground Jury Member)
- (Sweden) Maj. P. Karsten (Ground Jury Member)
- (France) Capt. Chodron de Coursel (Ground Jury Member)
- (Norway) Capt. Bauman (Ground Jury Member)
- (Russian Empire) Capt. Gabriel Bertrin (Ground Jury Member)
- Germany - Col. Paul Seiffert (Ground Jury Member)

Eventing

- (Sweden) Colonel Th. Rudenschiöld (Ground Jury President)
- (Sweden) Captain C. Knös (Ground Jury Member)

== Sources ==
- "Olympic Medal Winners". International Olympic Committee.
- Swedish Olympic Committee; Erik Bergvall (December 1913). "The Official Report of the Olympic Games of Stockholm 1912" (PDF). Wahlström & Widstrand. Archived from the original (pdf) on 10 April 2008.
