= Equestrian at the 1912 Summer Olympics – Team eventing =

Team eventing at the Games of the V Olympiad
- Dates: 13 July (events 1–2); 15 July (event 3); 16 July (event 4); 17 July (event 5)
- Competitors: 27 from 7 nations

Medalists
1st place, gold medalist(s)		Nils Adlercreutz, Ernst Casparsson, Henric Horn af Åminne, Axel Nordlander	Sweden
2nd place, silver medalist(s)		Eduard von Lütcken, Carl von Moers, Friedrich von Rochow, Richard Graf von Schaesberg-Tannheim	Germany
3rd place, bronze medalist(s)		Ephraim Graham, Guy Henry, Benjamin Lear, John Montgomery	United States

The team eventing was an equestrian event held as part of the Equestrian at the 1912 Summer Olympics programme. It was the first appearance of the event. The team score was simply the sum of the best three scores for each nation in the individual eventing competition.

== Results ==
Place	Team	Ind. place	Score	Total
Final
1	Sweden			139.06
1	Axel Nordlander and Lady Artist	1	46.59	139.06
1	Nils Adlercreutz and Atout	4	46.31	139.06
1	Ernst Casparsson and Irmelin	5	46.16	139.06
1	Henric Horn af Åminne and Omen	10	45.85	139.06
2	Germany			138.48
2	Friedrich von Rochow and Idealist	2	46.42	138.48
2	Richard Graf von Schaesberg-Tannheim and Grundsee	5	46.16	138.48
2	Eduard von Lütcken and Blue Boy	8	45.90	138.48
2	Carl von Moers and May-Queen	15	44.43	138.48
3	United States			137.33
3	Benjamin Lear and Poppy	7	45.91	137.33
3	John Montgomery and Deceive	9	45.88	137.33
3	Guy Henry and Chiswell	11	45.54	137.33
3	Ephraim Graham and Connie	12	45.30	137.33
4	France			136.77
4	Jacques Cariou and Cocotte	3	46.32	136.77
4	Ernest Meyer and Allons-y	12	45.30	136.77
4	Gaston Seigner and Dignité	14	45.15	136.77
4	Pierre Dufour d'Astafort and Castibalza	27	DNF	136.77
—	Belgium			—
—	Gaston de Trannoy and Capricieux	16	DNF	—
—	Paul Convert and La Sioute	18	DNF	—
—	Emmanuel de Blommaert and Clonmore	24	DNF	—
—	Guy Reyntiens and Beau Soleil	24	DNF	—
—	Denmark			—
—	Frode Kirkebjerg and Dibbe-Lippe	20	DNF	—
—	Carl Kraft and Gorm	21	DNF	—
—	Carl Saunte and Streg	27	DNF	—
—	Great Britain			—
—	Paul Kenna and Harmony	17	DNF	—
—	Edward Radcliffe-Nash and The Flea	19	DNF	—
—	Herbert Scott and Wisper II	21	DNF	—
—	Brian Turner Tom Lawrence and Patrick	23	DNF	—

== Sources ==
- Bergvall, Erik (ed.) (1913). Adams-Ray, Edward (trans.). (ed.). The Official Report of the Olympic Games of Stockholm 1912. Stockholm: Wahlström & Widstrand.
- Wudarski, Pawel (1999). "Wyniki Igrzysk Olimpijskich" (in Polish). Archived from the original on 16 February 2009.
