= Equestrian at the 1912 Summer Olympics – Individual eventing =

Equestrian at the Olympics

Individual eventing at the Games of the V Olympiad
- Dates: 13 July (events 1–2); 15 July (event 3); 16 July (event 4); 17 July (event 5)
- Competitors: 27 from 7 nations

Medalists
1st place, gold medalist(s)		Axel Nordlander	Sweden
2nd place, silver medalist(s)		Friedrich von Rochow	Germany
3rd place, bronze medalist(s)		Jacques Cariou	France

The individual eventing (Military) was an equestrian event held as part of the equestrian at the 1912 Summer Olympics programme. It was the first appearance of the event.

The competition was held from Saturday to Wednesday, 13 to 17 July 1912 for a period of five days, with a day rest after the first two events. A maximum of four riders from each nation was allowed. The entries closed on 1 June 1912. Every rider had to ride only one and the same horse in the event.

== Results ==
The start and finish were both on the grounds of the Field Riding Club. In consequence of the hot weather prevailing, the ground was very hard. All the competitors were previously shown the course, which was marked with red flags. In addition to this, a map of the course and definite instructions were given by the guides to the competitors.

=== Trial 1 – Long distance ride ===
Saturday, 13 July: 8 a.m. (Starting interval five minutes) Course of the "Fältridtklubben" (Stockholm Cross Country Riding Club) Riders had 4 hours to cover a distance of 55 kilometres. Jacques Cariou set the fastest time. One rider had a deduction for being 40 seconds too slow and one rider retired.

Event 1
Place	Start No.	Rider	Time	Deduction	Points
1	4	Jacques Cariou (FRA)	3'35:31	0	10
1	18	Pierre Dufour d'Astafort (FRA)	3'42:22	0	10
1	23	Emmanuel de Blommaert (BEL)	3'44:08	0	10
1	27	Eduard von Lütcken (GER)	3'44:12	0	10
1	2	Paul Convert (BEL)	3'45:31	0	10
1	16	Guy Reyntiens (BEL)	3'48:41	0	10
1	22	Axel Nordlander (SWE)	3'49:09	0	10
1	24	Herbert Scott (GBR)	3'49:48	0	10
1	20	Benjamin Lear (USA)	3'50:34	0	10
1	21	Carl von Moers (GER)	3'51:30	0	10
1	11	Ernest Meyer (FRA)	3'51:47	0	10
1	6	Ephraim Graham (USA)	3'52:06	0	10
1	1	Ernst Casparsson (SWE)	3'52:41	0	10
1	7	Richard Graf von Schaesberg-Tannheim (GER)	3'52:59	0	10
1	8	Nils Adlercreutz (SWE)	3'53:30	0	10
1	3	Brian Turner Tom Lawrence (GBR)	3'53:48	0	10
1	10	Edward Radcliffe-Nash (GBR)	3'55:28	0	10
1	5	Carl Kraft (DEN)	3'55:38	0	10
1	16	Henric Horn af Åminne (SWE)	3'55:56	0	10
1	13	Guy Henry (USA)	3'56:19	0	10
1	26	John Montgomery (USA)	3'56:39	0	10
1	14	Friedrich von Rochow (GER)	3'58:41	0	10
1	12	Frode Kirkebjerg (DEN)	3'58:50	0	10
1	9	Gaston de Trannoy (BEL)	3'59:05	0	10
1	17	Paul Kenna (GBR)	3'59:25	0	10
26	25	Gaston Seigner (FRA)	4'00:40	1	9
—	19	Carl Saunte (DEN)	DNF	10	

=== Trial 2 – Cross country ride ===
Saturday, 13 July: The five kilometres course could not be called difficult, the obstacles consisting chiefly of fences, with or without ditches, and streams, however only the heat was oppressive. 15 minutes were allotted. Points were deducted both for going over time (which no rider did) and for faults. Three riders were disqualified due to riding the wrong way. The raw score was 130 points; it was divided by 13 and rounded to two decimal places to get a standardized score for the overall competition.

Event 2
Place	Start No.	Rider	Time	Faults	Raw score	Points
1	23	Herbert Scott (GBR)	8:44	0	130	10.00
1	14	Friedrich von Rochow (GER)	9:02	0	130	10.00
1	7	Richard Graf von Schaesberg-Tannheim (GER)	9:11	0	130	10.00
1	15	Henric Horn af Åminne (SWE)	9:23	0	130	10.00
1	26	Eduard von Lütcken (GER)	9:25	0	130	10.00
1	21	Axel Nordlander (SWE)	9:37	0	130	10.00
1	11	Ernest Meyer (FRA)	9:43	0	130	10.00
1	5	Carl Kraft (DEN)	10:18	0	130	10.00
1	4	Jacques Cariou (FRA)	10:33	0	130	10.00
1	20	Carl von Moers (GER)	11:00	0	130	10.00
1	25	John Montgomery (USA)	11:01	0	130	10.00
1	19	Benjamin Lear (USA)	11:23	0	130	10.00
1	17	Paul Kenna (GBR)	11:28	0	130	10.00
14	3	Brian Turner Tom Lawrence (GBR)	9:08	2	128	9.85
14	2	Paul Convert (BEL)	9:12	2	128	9.85
14	8	Nils Adlercreutz (SWE)	10:28	2	128	9.85
17	10	Edward Radcliffe-Nash (GBR)	10:13	4	126	9.69
17	9	Gaston de Trannoy (BEL)	11:29	4	126	9.69
19	1	Ernst Casparsson (SWE)	10:10	5	125	9.62
19	6	Ephraim Graham (USA)	11:29	5	125	9.62
21	13	Guy Henry (USA)	10:22	7	123	9.46
22	24	Gaston Seigner (FRA)	11:03	10	120	9.23
23	12	Frode Kirkebjerg (DEN)	10:08	56	74	5.69
—	22	Emmanuel de Blommaert (BEL)	8:49	130	0	DQ
—	18	Pierre Dufour d'Astafort (FRA)	10:38	130	0	DQ
—	16	Guy Reyntiens (BEL)	8:35	130	0	DQ
		Carl Saunte (DEN)	retired			

After 2 events
Place	Rider	1	2	Total
1	Henric Horn af Åminne (SWE)	10	10.00	20.00
1	Jacques Cariou (FRA)	10	10.00	20.00
1	Paul Kenna (GBR)	10	10.00	20.00
1	Carl Kraft (DEN)	10	10.00	20.00
1	Benjamin Lear (USA)	10	10.00	20.00
1	Eduard von Lütcken (GER)	10	10.00	20.00
1	Ernest Meyer (FRA)	10	10.00	20.00
1	John Montgomery (USA)	10	10.00	20.00
1	Carl von Moers (GER)	10	10.00	20.00
1	Axel Nordlander (SWE)	10	10.00	20.00
1	Friedrich von Rochow (GER)	10	10.00	20.00
1	Richard Graf von Schaesberg-Tannheim (GER)	10	10.00	20.00
1	Herbert Scott (GBR)	10	10.00	20.00
14	Nils Adlercreutz (SWE)	10	9.85	19.85
14	Paul Convert (BEL)	10	9.85	19.85
14	Brian Turner Tom Lawrence (GBR)	10	9.85	19.85
17	Edward Radcliffe-Nash (GBR)	10	9.69	19.69
17	Gaston de Trannoy (BEL)	10	9.69	19.69
19	Ernst Casparsson (SWE)	10	9.62	19.62
19	Ephraim Graham (USA)	10	9.62	19.62
21	Guy Henry (USA)	10	9.46	19.46
22	Gaston Seigner (FRA)	9	9.23	18.23
23	Frode Kirkebjerg (DEN)	10	5.69	15.69
—	Emmanuel de Blommaert (BEL)	10	retired	
—	Pierre Dufour d'Astafort (FRA)	10	retired	
—	Guy Reyntiens (BEL)	10	retired	
—	Carl Saunte (DEN)	retired		

=== Trial 3 – Individual riding over steeplechase course ===
Monday, 15 July: The third trial was a steeplechase, which took place at Lindarängen. 5 minutes and 50 seconds were allotted. Deductions were taken both for time and for obstacles, though no rider incurred any obstacle faults. Three riders had a deduction for going over time, which causes two points every second. One rider did not start and one rider was disqualified due to riding the wrong way. Brian Turner Tom Lawrence did not finish the race after falling at a grass-covered ditch outside the course. The accident causing a slight concussion of the brain, from which the rider soon recovered, however. Raw scores were out of 100, divided by 10 to get a standardized score.

Event 3
Place	Start No.	Rider	Time	Faults	Raw score	Points
1	18	Axel Nordlander (SWE)	5:19	0	100	10.0
1	1	Ernst Casparsson (SWE)	5:22	0	100	10.0
1	13	Friedrich von Rochow (GER)	5:22	0	100	10.0
1	11	Frode Kirkebjerg (DEN)	5:25	0	100	10.0
1	22	Eduard von Lütcken (GER)	5:30	0	100	10.0
1	8	Gaston de Trannoy (BEL)	5:31	0	100	10.0
1	7	Nils Adlercreutz (SWE)	5:36	0	100	10.0
1	2	Paul Convert (BEL)	5:37	0	100	10.0
1	10	Ernest Meyer (FRA)	5:37	0	100	10.0
1	6	Richard Graf von Schaesberg-Tannheim (GER)	5:38	0	100	10.0
1	14	Henric Horn af Åminne (SWE)	5:40	0	100	10.0
1	20	Gaston Seigner (FRA)	5:40	0	100	10.0
1	21	John Montgomery (USA)	5:40	0	100	10.0
1	16	Benjamin Lear (USA)	5:41	0	100	10.0
1	4	Jacques Cariou (FRA)	5:45	0	100	10.0
1	5	Ephraim Graham (USA)	5:45	0	100	10.0
1	12	Guy Henry (USA)	5:46	0	100	10.0
18	15	Paul Kenna (GBR)	5:53	6	94	9.4
19	9	Edward Radcliffe-Nash (GBR)	5:58	16	86	8.6
20	17	Carl von Moers (GER)	5:59	18	82	8.2
—	3	Brian Turner Tom Lawrence (GBR)	DNF	100	0	0.0
—	19	Herbert Scott (GBR)	5:35	100	0	DQ
—	(5)	Carl Kraft (DEN)	DNS	–	–	–
		Emmanuel de Blommaert (BEL)	retired			
		Pierre Dufour d'Astafort (FRA)	retired			
		Guy Reyntiens (BEL)	retired			
		Carl Saunte (DEN)	retired			

After 3 events
Place	Rider	1	2	3	Total
1	Henric Horn af Åminne (SWE)	10	10.00	10.0	30.00
1	Jacques Cariou (FRA)	10	10.00	10.0	30.00
1	Benjamin Lear (USA)	10	10.00	10.0	30.00
1	Eduard von Lütcken (GER)	10	10.00	10.0	30.00
1	Ernest Meyer (FRA)	10	10.00	10.0	30.00
1	John Montgomery (USA)	10	10.00	10.0	30.00
1	Axel Nordlander (SWE)	10	10.00	10.0	30.00
1	Friedrich von Rochow (GER)	10	10.00	10.0	30.00
1	Richard Graf von Schaesberg-Tannheim (GER)	10	10.00	10.0	30.00
10	Nils Adlercreutz (SWE)	10	9.85	10.0	29.85
10	Paul Convert (BEL)	10	9.85	10.0	29.85
12	Gaston de Trannoy (BEL)	10	9.69	10.0	29.69
13	Ernst Casparsson (SWE)	10	9.62	10.0	29.62
13	Ephraim Graham (USA)	10	9.62	10.0	29.62
15	Guy Henry (USA)	10	9.46	10.0	29.46
16	Paul Kenna (GBR)	10	10.00	9.4	29.40
17	Gaston Seigner (FRA)	9	9.23	10.0	28.23
18	Carl von Moers (GER)	10	10.00	8.2	28.20
19	Edward Radcliffe-Nash (GBR)	10	9.69	8.6	28.09
20	Frode Kirkebjerg (DEN)	10	5.69	10.0	25.69
—	Carl Kraft (DEN)	10	10.00	retired	
—	Herbert Scott (GBR)	10	10.00	retired	
—	Brian Turner Tom Lawrence (GBR)	10	9.85	retired	
—	Emmanuel de Blommaert (BEL)	10	retired		
—	Pierre Dufour d'Astafort (FRA)	10	retired		
—	Guy Reyntiens (BEL)	10	retired		
—	Carl Saunte (DEN)	retired			

=== Trial 4 – Prize jumping (Show jumping test) ===
After the presentation on Monday afternoon of the prizes won in track and field events, the Stadium had been transformed into an obstacle-course, with flower-beds here and there.

Tuesday, 16 July: The fourth trial was an obstacle jumping course, which took place in the Olympiastadion. 15 obstacles, which were of small dimensions and fewer in number than for the other prize jumping events, had to be cleared perfectly. 2 minutes and 45 seconds were allotted. Deductions were taken both for time and for not completely clearing obstacles. One rider did not start and two riders were disqualified. Raw scores were out of 150, which were divided by 15 and rounded to two decimal places to get a standardized score.

The obstacles:

- 1: Hedge height: 1.10 metre, width: 0.60 metres
- 2: Fence height: 1.15 metre
- 3: Stone-Wall height: 1.30 metre, base-width: 1.50 metre, top-width: 0.70 metre
- 4: Railway-gates two each height: 1.15 metre; 8 metres between
- 5: Triple-bar height first: 0.75 metre, second: 1.00 metre, third: 1.25 metre; 2 metres between first and last
- 6: Fence in Dike 2.70 metre from bank to obstacle and also 2.70 metre from obstacle to bank; height: 1.10 metre
- 7: Hedge and Top Bar height at the front: 0.90 metre and at the back: 1.15 metre width: 0.75 metre
- 8: Fence-Dike-Hedge height fence: 1.00 metre, height hedge: 0.75 metre; between 5 metres dike, 0.50 metre deep
- 9: Fence height: 1.35 metre
- 10: Brick-Wall height: 1.40 metre, base-width: 1.50 metre, top-width: 0.70 metre
- 11: Country Road with fence on each side, each fence height: 1.00 metre, 9 metres between; behind the first a 1-metre ditch and also in front of the second
- 12: Earth-Wall with Bar height of the wall: 1.00 metre, with the bar: 1.30 metre; top-width: 0.80 metre
- 13: Stone-Wall-Dike-Stone-Wall stone wall height: 1.10 metre, base-width: 1.10; 8 metres to the dike, which is 2.50 metre wide, and another stone wall of the same proportions
- 14: Bank-Fence a 1.30 metre ditch is followed by a long bank with 1.00 height, at the end of the bank a 0.50 metre high fence, followed after 8 metres by a second 1.10 high fence
- 15: Dike a 0.60 metre high obstacle in front of a 4.00 metres wide dike

Event 4
			Faults																		
Place	Rider	Time	T	1	2	3	4	5	6	7	8	9	10	11	12	13	14	15	Total	Raw score	Points
1	Ernst Casparsson (SWE)	2:44.4	–	–	–	–	2	–	–	–	2	–	1	–	–	–	–	–	5	145	9.67
2	Ernest Meyer (FRA)	2:47.0	2	–	–	–	1	–	–	–	4	–	–	–	–	–	–	–	7	143	9.53
2	Friedrich von Rochow (GER)	2:44.0	–	–	–	–	1	1	–	–	4	–	1	–	–	–	–	–	7	143	9.53
4	Ephraim Graham (USA)	2:33.6	–	–	–	–	2	–	–	–	4	2	1	–	–	–	–	–	9	141	9.40
4	John Montgomery (USA)	2:47.4	2	–	–	–	–	–	–	–	2	4	1	–	–	–	–	–	9	141	9.40
4	Richard Graf von Schaesberg-Tannheim (GER)	2:43.8	–	–	–	–	1	–	–	–	4	–	–	–	–	–	4	–	9	141	9.40
7	Gaston Seigner (FRA)	2:51.0	4	–	–	–	–	–	–	–	4	2	–	–	–	–	–	–	10	140	9.33
8	Eduard von Lütcken (GER)	2:41.0	–	–	–	–	3	4	–	–	4	–	–	–	–	–	–	–	11	139	9.27
9	Guy Henry (USA)	2:33.8	–	–	–	–	5	–	–	–	4	–	4	–	–	–	–	–	13	137	9.13
10	Benjamin Lear (USA)	2:55.2	6	–	–	–	–	2	2	–	2	–	1	–	–	–	1	–	14	136	9.07
11	Nils Adlercreutz (SWE)	2:42.0	–	–	4	–	–	–	–	–	4	4	1	–	–	–	2	–	15	135	9.00
12	Axel Nordlander (SWE)	2:46.0	2	–	–	–	5	1	–	–	4	–	–	–	–	–	4	–	16	134	8.93
13	Carl von Moers (GER)	2:48.0	2	–	–	–	8	–	–	–	4	–	1	–	1	–	–	–	20	130	8.67
14	Jacques Cariou (FRA)	3:16.0	14	–	1	–	–	–	–	–	2	1	1	–	2	–	–	–	21	129	8.60
15	Paul Convert (BEL)	3:17.0	14	–	–	–	1	–	1	–	–	2	1	–	–	–	6	–	25	125	8.33
16	Henric Horn af Åminne (SWE)	2:49.4	2	–	4	–	2	1	1	–	4	4	1	1	–	4	–	2	26	124	8.27
17	Edward Radcliffe-Nash (GBR)	3:14.0	12	–	–	–	4	–	–	–	4	–	–	1	–	–	6	–	27	123	8.20
—	Paul Kenna (GBR)	3:20.0	14	–	–	–	–	–	–	–	4	–	–	–		–	–	–	150	0	DQ
—	Gaston de Trannoy (BEL)	3:12.4	12	–	–	–	2	–	1	1	1	2	1	–	–	–		–	150	0	DQ
—	Frode Kirkebjerg (DEN)	DNS																	–	–	–
	Carl Kraft (DEN)	retired																			
	Herbert Scott (GBR)	retired																			
	Brian Turner Tom Lawrence (GBR)	retired																			
	Emmanuel de Blommaert (BEL)	retired																			
	Pierre Dufour d'Astafort (FRA)	retired																			
	Guy Reyntiens (BEL)	retired																			
	Carl Saunte (DEN)	retired																			

After 4 events
Place	Rider	1	2	3	4	Total
1	Ernest Meyer (FRA)	10	10.00	10.0	9.53	39.53
1	Friedrich von Rochow (GER)	10	10.00	10.0	9.53	39.53
3	John Montgomery (USA)	10	10.00	10.0	9.40	39.40
3	Richard Graf von Schaesberg-Tannheim (GER)	10	10.00	10.0	9.40	39.40
5	Ernst Casparsson (SWE)	10	9.62	10.0	9.67	39.29
6	Eduard von Lütcken (GER)	10	10.00	10.0	9.27	39.27
7	Benjamin Lear (USA)	10	10.00	10.0	9.07	39.07
8	Ephraim Graham (USA)	10	9.62	10.0	9.40	39.02
9	Axel Nordlander (SWE)	10	10.00	10.0	8.93	38.93
10	Nils Adlercreutz (SWE)	10	9.85	10.0	9.00	38.85
11	Jacques Cariou (FRA)	10	10.00	10.0	8.60	38.60
12	Guy Henry (USA)	10	9.46	10.0	9.13	38.59
13	Henric Horn af Åminne (SWE)	10	10.00	10.0	8.27	38.27
14	Paul Convert (BEL)	10	9.85	10.0	8.33	38.18
15	Gaston Seigner (FRA)	9	9.23	10.0	9.33	37.56
16	Carl von Moers (GER)	10	10.00	8.2	8.67	36.87
17	Edward Radcliffe-Nash (GBR)	10	9.69	8.6	8.20	36.29
—	Gaston de Trannoy (BEL)	10	9.69	10.0	retired	
—	Paul Kenna (GBR)	10	10.00	9.4	retired	
—	Frode Kirkebjerg (DEN)	10	5.69	10.0	retired	
—	Carl Kraft (DEN)	10	10.00	retired		
—	Herbert Scott (GBR)	10	10.00	retired		
—	Brian Turner Tom Lawrence (GBR)	10	9.85	retired		
—	Emmanuel de Blommaert (BEL)	10	retired			
—	Pierre Dufour d'Astafort (FRA)	10	retired			
—	Guy Reyntiens (BEL)	10	retired			
—	Carl Saunte (DEN)	retired				

=== Trial 5 – Prize riding (Dressage test) ===
Wednesday, 17 July: The prize riding was also held in the Olympiastadion. The score for the final event was determined by a panel of 7 judges, each giving a score of up to 110. The maximum raw score was therefore 770, which was divided by 77 and rounded to two decimal places to standardize it for the overall competition.

Event 5
Place	Rider	Raw score	Points
1	Jacques Cariou (FRA)	594.2	7.72
2	Axel Nordlander (SWE)	590.0	7.66
3	Gaston Seigner (FRA)	584.2	7.59
4	Henric Horn af Åminne (SWE)	583.8	7.58
5	Carl von Moers (GER)	582.5	7.56
6	Nils Adlercreutz (SWE)	574.2	7.46
7	Guy Henry (USA)	535.5	6.95
8	Friedrich von Rochow (GER)	530.7	6.89
9	Ernst Casparsson (SWE)	529.0	6.87
10	Benjamin Lear (USA)	527.0	6.84
11	Richard Graf von Schaesberg-Tannheim (GER)	520.5	6.76
12	Eduard von Lütcken (GER)	510.5	6.63
13	John Montgomery (USA)	499.0	6.48
14	Ephraim Graham (USA)	483.5	6.28
15	Ernest Meyer (FRA)	444.0	5.77
—	Paul Convert (BEL)	DNS	–
—	Edward Radcliffe-Nash (GBR)	DNS	–
	Gaston de Trannoy (BEL)	retired	
	Paul Kenna (GBR)	retired	
	Frode Kirkebjerg (DEN)	retired	
	Carl Kraft (DEN)	retired	
	Herbert Scott (GBR)	retired	
	Brian Turner Tom Lawrence (GBR)	retired	
	Emmanuel de Blommaert (BEL)	retired	
	Pierre Dufour d'Astafort (FRA)	retired	
	Guy Reyntiens (BEL)	retired	
	Carl Saunte (DEN)	retired	

Final standings
Place	Rider	1	2	3	4	5	Total
Gold	Axel Nordlander and Lady Artist (SWE)	10	10.00	10.0	8.93	7.66	46.59
Silver	Friedrich von Rochow and Idealist (GER)	10	10.00	10.0	9.53	6.89	46.42
Bronze	Jacques Cariou and Cocotte (FRA)	10	10.00	10.0	8.60	7.72	46.32
4	Nils Adlercreutz and Atout (SWE)	10	9.85	10.0	9.00	7.46	46.31
5	Ernst Casparsson and Irmelin (SWE)	10	9.62	10.0	9.67	6.87	46.16
5	Richard Graf von Schaesberg-Tannheim and Grundsee (GER)	10	10.00	10.0	9.40	6.76	46.16
7	Benjamin Lear and Poppy (USA)	10	10.00	10.0	9.07	6.84	45.91
8	Eduard von Lütcken and Blue Boy (GER)	10	10.00	10.0	9.27	6.63	45.90
9	John Montgomery and Deceive (USA)	10	10.00	10.0	9.40	6.48	45.88
10	Henric Horn af Åminne and Omen (SWE)	10	10.00	10.0	8.27	7.58	45.85
11	Guy Henry and Chiswell (USA)	10	9.46	10.0	9.13	6.95	45.54
12	Ephraim Graham and Connie (USA)	10	9.62	10.0	9.40	6.28	45.30
12	Ernest Meyer and Allons-y (FRA)	10	10.00	10.0	9.53	5.77	45.30
14	Gaston Seigner and Dignité (FRA)	9	9.23	10.0	9.33	7.59	45.15
15	Carl von Moers and May-Queen (GER)	10	10.00	8.2	8.67	7.56	44.43
—	Paul Convert and La Sioute (BEL)	10	9.85	10.0	8.33	retired	
—	Edward Radcliffe-Nash and The Flea (GBR)	10	9.69	9.2	8.20	retired	
—	Gaston de Trannoy and Capricieux (BEL)	10	9.69	10.0	retired		
—	Paul Kenna and Harmony (GBR)	10	10.00	9.4	retired		
—	Frode Kirkebjerg and Dibbe-Lippe (DEN)	10	5.69	10.0	retired		
—	Carl Kraft and Gorm (DEN)	10	10.00	retired			
—	Herbert Scott and Wisper II (GBR)	10	10.00	retired			
—	Brian Turner Tom Lawrence and Patrick (GBR)	10	9.85	retired			
—	Emmanuel de Blommaert and Clonmore (BEL)	10	retired				
—	Pierre Dufour d'Astafort and Castibalza (FRA)	10	retired				
—	Guy Reyntiens and Beau Soleil (BEL)	10	retired				
—	Carl Saunte and Streg (DEN)	retired					

== Sources ==
- Bergvall, Erik (ed.) (1913). Adams-Ray, Edward (trans.). (ed.). The Official Report of the Olympic Games of Stockholm 1912. Stockholm: Wahlström & Widstrand.
- Wudarski, Pawel (1999). "Wyniki Igrzysk Olimpijskich" (in Polish). Archived from the original on 16 February 2009.
