= Equestrian at the 1912 Summer Olympics – Individual jumping =

Individual jumping at the Games of the V Olympiad
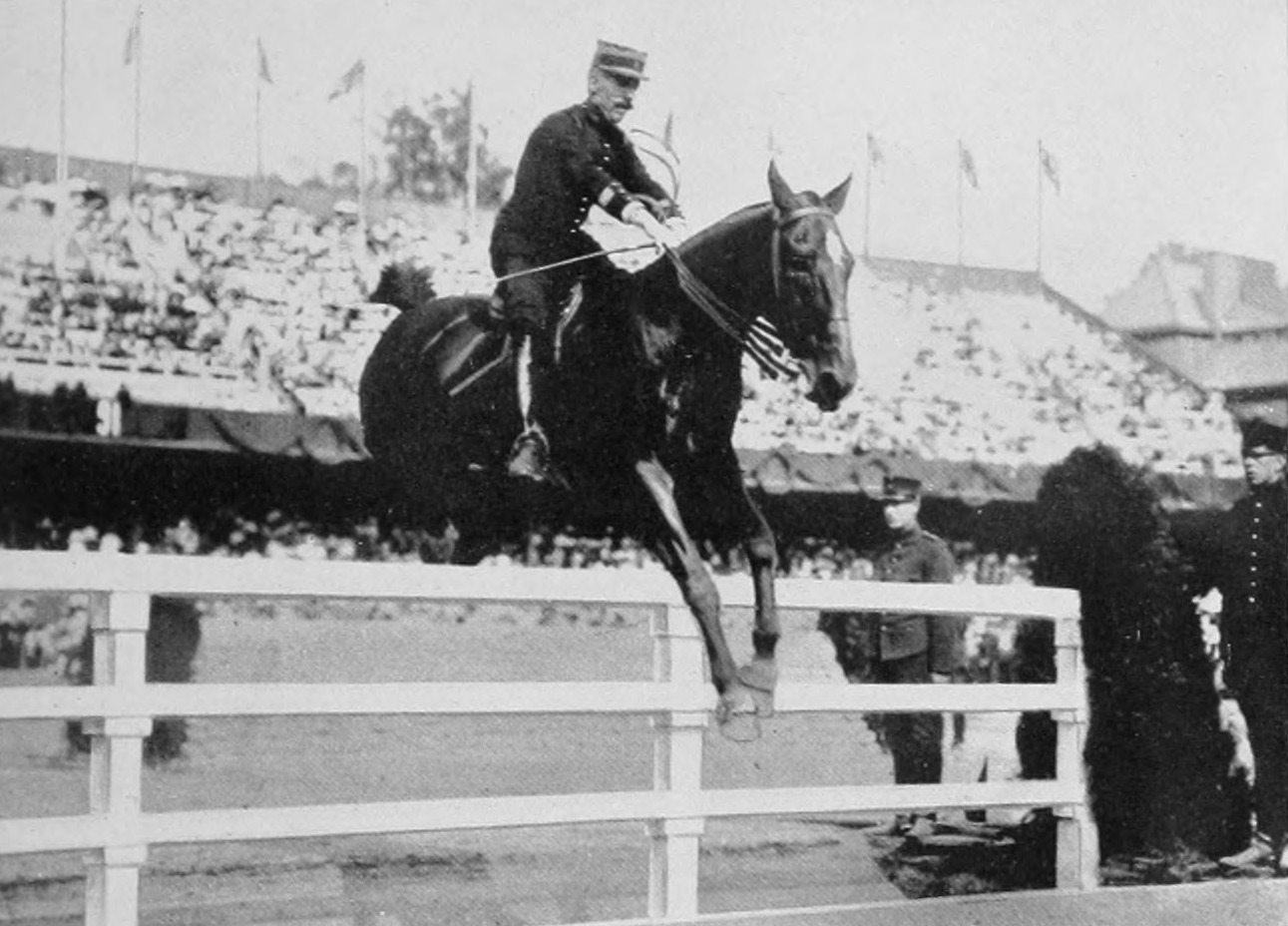
- Jacques Cariou competing
- Venue: Stockholm Olympic Stadium
- Date: 16 July
- Competitors: 31 from 8 nations
- Winning score: 186

Medalists
| 1st place, gold medalist(s) | | Jacques Cariou; France |
| 2nd place, silver medalist(s) | | Rabod von Kröcher; Germany |
| 3rd place, bronze medalist(s) | | Emmanuel de Blommaert; Belgium |

The individual show jumping was an equestrian event held as part of the Equestrian at the 1912 Summer Olympics programme. The competition was held on 16 July 1912 as the Stockholm Olympic Stadium. There were 31 competitors from 8 nations. Each nation was limited to a maximum of six riders. The event was won by Jacques Cariou of France, the nation's first victory in the individual jumping. The victory came with a challenge prize presented by Count Gyula Andrássy the Younger of Hungary. Rabod von Kröcher earned Germany's first medal in the event with his silver. Emmanuel de Blommaert of Belgium took bronze.

== Background ==
This was the second appearance of the event, which had first been held at the 1900 Summer Olympics and has been held at every Summer Olympics at which equestrian sports have been featured (that is, excluding 1896, 1904, and 1908). It is the oldest event on the current programme, the only one that was held in 1900.

Chile, Germany, Great Britain, Norway, and Sweden each made their debut in the event. Belgium, France, and Russia all competed for the second time, having previously appeared at the first competition in 1900.

== Competition format ==
The 1,533 metre course consisted of 19 jumps (15 physical obstacles, 4 of which were jumped twice). Each jump had a maximum of 10 points, so the total possible was 190 points. Long jump obstacles had a maximum distance of 4 metres. The maximum height of jumps was 1.4 metres.

The deductions possible were: 2 points for a first refusal, 4 for a second, 6 for a third; 4 points for a horse falling; 6 points for the rider being unseated; 1 point for touching the obstacle without knocking it down; 4 points for knocking an obstacle down with the horse's fore legs, 2 points for knocking it down with the hind legs; 1 point for landing with hind legs on the end line of a long jump, 2 points for the hind legs inside the end line (or touching the surface of the water) or the fore legs on the line, 4 points for the fore legs inside the end line (or touching the water); and 2 points for every 5 seconds over the time limit of 3:50.0 (400 metres per minute).

Only "gentlemen" were permitted. Thus, professionals, women, and non-commissioned officers were ineligible. Military school horses were excluded, but all other horses were allowed.

== Schedule ==
| Date | Time | Round |
|---|---|---|
| Tuesday, 16 July 1912 | 14:00 | Final |

== Results ==
3 minutes and 50 seconds were allotted. 190 points was the maximum score.

The jump-off for the gold medal used a shortened course of only 6 obstacles. Cariou had 5 faults throughout the jump-off, while von Kröcher had 7.

| Rank | Rider | Horse | Nation | Time | Penalty | Faults | Score | Jump-off |
|---|---|---|---|---|---|---|---|---|
| 1st place, gold medalist(s) | Jacques Cariou | Mignon | France | — | 0 | 4 | 186 | 55 |
| 2nd place, silver medalist(s) | Rabod von Kröcher | Dohna | Germany | — | 0 | 4 | 186 | 53 |
| 3rd place, bronze medalist(s) | Emmanuel de Blommaert | Clomore | Belgium | — | 0 | 5 | 185 | —N/a |
| 4 | Herbert Scott | Shamrock | Great Britain | — | 0 | 6 | 184 | —N/a |
| 5 | Sigismund Freyer | Ultimus | Germany | — | 0 | 7 | 183 | —N/a |
| 6 | Nils Adlercreutz | Ilex | Sweden | — | 0 | 9 | 181 | —N/a |
| 6 | Ernst Casparsson | Kiriki | Sweden | — | 0 | 9 | 181 | —N/a |
| 6 | Wilhelm Graf von Hohenau | Pretty Girl | Germany | — | 0 | 9 | 181 | —N/a |
| 9 | Ernst Deloch | Hubertus | Germany | — | 0 | 10 | 180 | —N/a |
| 9 | Gustaf Lewenhaupt | Medusa | Sweden | — | 0 | 10 | 180 | —N/a |
| 9 | Charles Lewenhaupt | Arno | Sweden | — | 0 | 10 | 180 | —N/a |
| 9 | Dmitri Pavlovich | Unité | Russia | — | 0 | 10 | 180 | —N/a |
| 13 | Pierre Dufour d'Astafort | Amazone | France | — | 0 | 11 | 179 | —N/a |
| 13 | Carl-Axel Torén | Falken | Sweden | — | 0 | 11 | 179 | —N/a |
| 15 | Karol Rómmel | Siablik | Russia | — | 0 | 12 | 178 | —N/a |
| 16 | Enrique Deichler | Chile | Chile | — | 0 | 14 | 176 | —N/a |
| 16 | Aleksandr Rodzyanko | Eros | Russia | — | 0 | 14 | 176 | —N/a |
| 18 | Friedrich von Grote | Polyphem | Germany | --- | 0 | 16 | 174 | —N/a |
| 18 | Prince Friedrich Karl of Prussia | Gibson Boy | Germany | — | 0 | 16 | 174 | —N/a |
| 18 | Sergey Zagorsky | Bandoura | Russia | — | 0 | 16 | 174 | —N/a |
| 21 | Mikhail Pleshkov | Yvette | Russia | — | 0 | 17 | 173 | —N/a |
| 22 | Åke Hök | Mona | Sweden | — | 0 | 20 | 170 | —N/a |
| 22 | Aleksey Selikhov | Tugela | Russia | — | 0 | 20 | 170 | —N/a |
| 24 | Karl Kildal | Garcia | Norway | — | 0 | 22 | 168 | —N/a |
| 25 | Elías Yáñez | Patria | Chile | — | 0 | 24 | 166 | —N/a |
| 26 | Jørgen Jensen | Jossy | Norway | — | 0 | 25 | 165 | —N/a |
| 27 | Paul Kenna | Harmony | Great Britain | 0:22.0 | 10 | 18 | 162 | —N/a |
| 28 | Jens Falkenberg | Florida | Norway | — | 0 | 29 | 161 | —N/a |
| 29 | Edward Radcliffe-Nash | The Flea | Great Britain | 0:40.2 | 18 | 19 | 153 | —N/a |
| 30 | Guy Reyntiens | Beau Soleil | Belgium | 0:33.0 | 14 | 29 | 147 | —N/a |
| — | Ernest Meyer | Ursule | France | DNF | | | | —N/a |

== Sources ==
- Bergvall, Erik (ed.) (1913). Adams-Ray, Edward (trans.). (ed.). The Official Report of the Olympic Games of Stockholm 1912. Stockholm: Wahlström & Widstrand.
- Wudarski, Pawel (1999). "Wyniki Igrzysk Olimpijskich" (in Polish). Archived from the original on 16 February 2009.
