= Eduard von Lütcken =

German equestrian (1882–1914)

Personal information
- National team: Germany
- Born: 26 October 1882 Syke, Niedersachsen
- Died: 15 September 1914 (aged 31) Szumsk, Lithuania

Sport
- Sport: Equestrianism
Medal record
Men's equestrianism
Olympic Games
Silver medal – second place	1912 Stockholm	Team eventing

Eduard von Lütcken (26 October 1882 – 15 September 1914) was a German horse rider who competed in the 1912 Summer Olympics. He was part of the German team that won the silver medal in the equestrian team event. After the Olympics, he served as an Oberleutnant in World War I, and was killed shortly after capturing several Russians on the Eastern Front.

== Early life and career ==
Von Lütcken was born on 26 October 1882 in Syke, Niedersachsen, in Germany as the son of local magistrate Eduard von Hermann von Lütcken and his wife Fida (née Meding). Von Lütcken studied at the University of Heidelberg where he was part of the Corps Vandalia Heidelberg fraternity and participated in duelling with swords and was marked by a scar on one cheek. Von Lütcken became an officer in the Royal Saxon Army and lived in Oschatz.

At the 1912 Olympics von Lütcken competed in the 3-day individual eventing competition. This was known at the time as the "military riding competition" and open to up to four active commissioned military officers from each country. Von Lütcken competed on his horse Blue Boy and came 8th out of 27 competitors. He scored maximum points on the 55 kilometres (34 mi) ride, 5 kilometres (3.1 mi) cross-country ride and the 3,500 metres (11,500 ft) steeplechase but came 5th in the fourth event, the jumping competition and 12th in the final section, dressage. The team eventing competition was judged by the sum of the best four individual competitors. Von Lütcken's was the third best scoring rider for Germany after Friedrich von Rochow and Richard Graf von Schaesberg-Tannheim. The team placed second, behind Sweden, and were awarded the silver medal.

== World War I ==
In the lead-up to Eastern Front, von Lütcken was serving as a riding instructor in Dresden. Upon the declaration of war he was placed with the 17th Royal Uhland Regiment as an Oberleutnant. Deployed to the Eastern Front, he fought at Szumsk in Lithuania – at the time part of the Russian Empire – where he captured a number of Russian soldiers, including a general. He was killed shortly afterwards, on 15 September 1914, in combat with a larger force of patrolling Russians on the road between Wilkowitzki and Mariompol. Von Lütcken's horse was shot from under him and he fought on foot with his pistol and sabre with two comrades until killed. A non-commissioned officer from his unit survived to relay the story, which was later confirmed by a letter to his family from a Russian Guards cavalry officer who commended his bravery.

== See also ==
- List of Olympians killed in World War I
- Germany at the 1912 Summer Olympics
