= Edward Radclyffe =

Edward Radclyffe may refer to:

- Edward Radclyffe, 6th Earl of Sussex (c. 1559–1643), MP for Petersfield, Bedfordshire and Portsmouth
- Edward Radclyffe, 2nd Earl of Derwentwater (1655–1705), also MP for Petersfield, Bedfordshire and Portsmouth
- Edward Radclyffe (1809–1863), British engraver

== See also ==
- Edward Radcliffe-Nash, British horse rider
