= Simon Mangan =

British Lord Lieutenant and landowner

Simon Mangan, in the uniform of one of HM's Lieutenants, c 1900

Simon Mangan (died 1906) was a landowner and Lord Lieutenant of Meath from 1894 to 1906. A JP, he was also in business with his son-in-law Patrick Leonard in moving cattle between the west and east of Ireland.

Mangan was the son of John Mangan (1788–1868) and Margaret (née) Duffy (d. 1843). He lived at Dunboyne Castle, which remained in his family until 1950, and married Margaret (née) Larkin (1839–1921), a first cousin of Brigadier Paul Kenna VC. Of his daughters, Minnie married the architect Ralph Byrne, Emily married Patrick Leonard and Kathleen married Cmdr Ralph Tindal-Carill-Worsley.

Honorary titles
Preceded by The 3rd Marquess of Headfort	Lord Lieutenant of Meath; 1894–1906	Succeeded by Sir Nugent Everard, 1st Baronet
