= Herbert Scott (equestrian) =

British equestrian

Herbert Stuart Lauriston Scott (29 December 1885 – 3 June 1966) was a British horse rider who competed in the 1912 Summer Olympics. He did not finish the Individual eventing (Military) competition, also the British team did not finish the team event. He finished fourth in the individual jumping event.
