= Paul Aloysius Kenna =

British Army general, recipient of the Victoria Cross and equestrian

Brigadier-General Paul Aloysius Kenna VC DSO
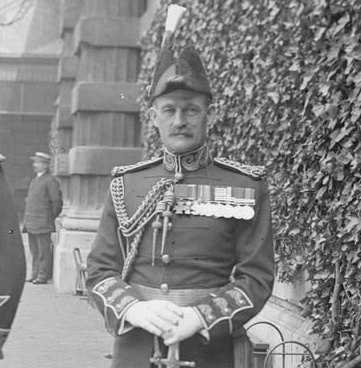
- Kenna, by Christina Broom
- Born: 16 August 1862; Everton, Liverpool
- Died: 30 August 1915 (aged 53); Suvla, Gallipoli, Ottoman Turkey
- Relatives: Montagu Arthur Bertie, 7th Earl of Abingdon (father-in-law), Simon Mangan, Patrick Leonard, Nicolas Tindal-Carill-Worsley
- Military career
- Allegiance: United Kingdom
- Branch: British Army
- Service years: 1886–1915
- Rank: Brigadier-General
- Units: 21st Lancers; 3rd (Nottinghamshire and Derbyshire) Mounted Brigade
- Conflicts: Mahdist War; Second Boer War; Third Somaliland Expedition; World War I †
- Awards: Victoria Cross, Distinguished Service Order
- Other work: Olympic horserider

Brigadier-General Paul Aloysius Kenna, VC, DSO (16 August 1862 – 30 August 1915) was an English-born British Army officer of Irish descent and recipient of the Victoria Cross (VC), the highest and most prestigious award for gallantry in the face of the enemy that could be awarded to British and British Empire forces. He also competed at the 1912 Summer Olympics.

== Background ==
He was the son of James Kenna, of Liverpool, who was descended from a family of minor gentry from County Meath. Kenna was educated first at St. Francis Xavier's College, Salisbury Street, Liverpool, then, after his father's death, at St. Augustine's College in Ramsgate 1874-9, and, from the age of 17, at Stonyhurst College. He is honoured in a memorial which can be seen in the main hall of the current St. Francis Xavier's College site in Beaconsfield Road, Liverpool, on the war memorial at St. Augustine's Church in Ramsgate and by a plaque and a portrait at Stonyhurst.

== Military career ==
After serving in the 4th (Militia) Battalion of the Durham Light Infantry, into which he was commissioned as a lieutenant in December 1882, Kenna, having resigned his commission in August 1884, attended the Royal Military College, Sandhurst and was re-commissioned into the British Army as a lieutenant in the 2nd West India Regiment on 25 August 1886, In 1887 he transferred once again, this time to the 21st Lancers (Empress of India's), and was promoted to captain on 12 June 1895. In that year he also received the Royal Humane Society's Certificate for saving a man from the river Liffey.

=== VC action ===
He was 36 years old, serving as a captain in the 21st Lancers during the Mahdist War when the following deed took place for which he was awarded the VC:

On 2 September 1898, at the Battle of Omdurman, Sudan, when a major of the 21st Lancers was in danger, as his horse had been shot in the charge, Captain Kenna took the major up on his own horse, to a place of safety. After the charge Captain Kenna returned to help Lieutenant De Montmorency who was trying to recover the body of an officer who had been killed.

He later served in the Second Boer War in South Africa 1899–1900, and, after being made an assistant provost marshal of Lieutenant General Sir John French's Cavalry Division in October 1899, was made a brigade major with the 4th Cavalry Brigade in July 1900, and promoted to brevet major on 29 November. For his service during the war, he was appointed a Companion of the Distinguished Service Order (DSO) in the South Africa Honours List published on 26 June 1902.

Following the end of the war that month Kenna returned to the United Kingdom in the RMS Dunottar Castle, which arrived at Southampton in July 1902. He received the substantive rank of major on 7 September, on his appointment to lead a mounted infantry flying column in Somaliland. He arrived there to take part in the 1903 Dervish War, which ended in British retreat. He was promoted to brevet lieutenant colonel in September 1904 and in October 1905 he became brigade major of the 1st Cavalry Brigade at Aldershot. He held this post until September 1906, when he was made a lieutenant colonel and assumed command of the 21st Lancers. In December he was promoted to brevet colonel and appointed an aide-de-camp to King Edward VII.

In September 1910 he relinquished command of his regiment and was placed on half-pay and promoted to colonel on the same date. In April 1912 he was appointed to command the Notts and Derby (Yeomanry) Mounted Brigade and on the outbreak of war over two years later was appointed brigadier-general.

== Olympics ==
He competed in the 1912 Summer Olympics for Great Britain as a horse rider. He did not finish the Individual eventing (Military) competition, also the British team did not finish the team event. In the individual jumping event he finished 27th.

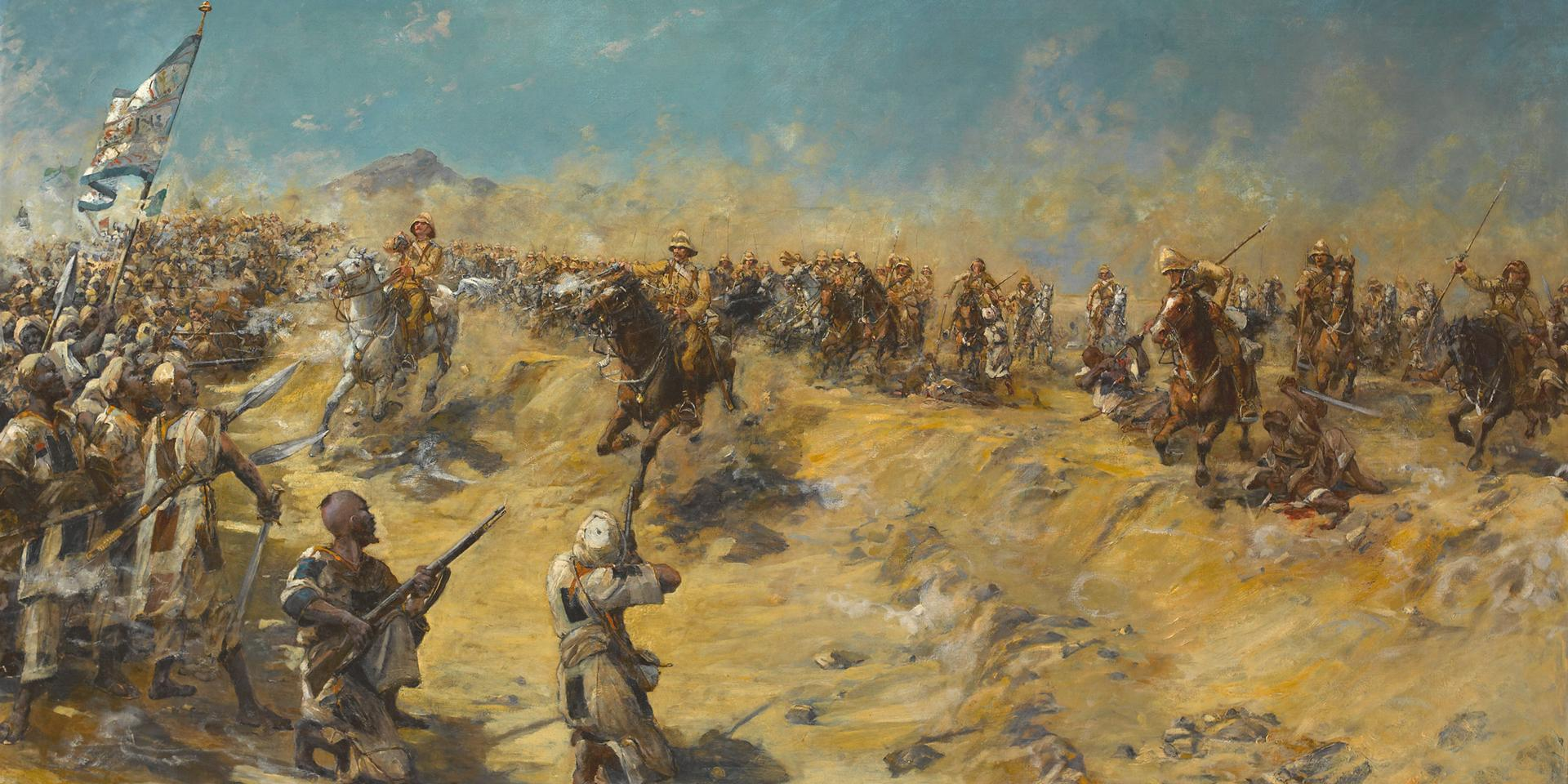
The Charge of the 21st Lancers at Omdurman by Edward Matthew Hale, 1899

== First World War ==
He was killed in action at Suvla, Turkey during the Battle of Gallipoli on 30 August 1915, aged 53 and is buried in Lala Baba Cemetery.

His Victoria Cross medal is on display in The Royal Lancers and Nottinghamshire Yeomanry Museum in Thoresby Park, Nottinghamshire.

== Family ==
Kenna married Lady Cecil Bertie, daughter of the 7th Earl of Abingdon. He married, secondly, Angela Mary, daughter of Herbert Hibbert. They had one daughter, Kathleen (died 1998)

His first cousin, Margaret (née) Larkin (granddaughter of his grandfather Patrick Kenna) married Simon Mangan, HM Lieutenant for County Meath. Their grandson was Group Captain Nicolas Tindal-Carill-Worsley.

== See also ==
- List of Olympians killed in World War I
- List of generals of the British Empire who died during the First World War

== Bibliography ==
- Davies, Frank; Maddocks, Graham (2014) [1995]. Bloody Red Tabs: General Officer Casualties of the Great War 1914–1918. Barnsley, South Yorkshire: Leo Cooper. ISBN 978-1-78346-237-7.
- Doherty, Richard; Truesdale, David (2000). Irish Winners of the Victoria Cross.
- Harvey, David (1999). Monuments to Courage.
- Murphy, James (2008). Liverpool VCs. Pen and Sword Books. ISBN 978-1844157808.
- The Register of the Victoria Cross. This England. 1997.
- Kirby, Henry L.; Walsh, R. Raymond (1987). The Seven V.C.s of Stonyhurst College. THCL Books. ISBN 0-948494-04-2.
