= Army Ground Forces =

Component of the US Army during World War II

- AGF Shoulder Sleeve Insignia
- Active: 1942–1948
- Country: United States
- Branch: United States Army
- Size: 780,000 (1942); 2,200,000 (1943)

Commanders
- Notable commanders: Lieutenant General Lesley J. McNair; Lieutenant General Ben Lear; General Joseph Stilwell; General Jacob L. Devers

The Army Ground Forces (AGF) were one of the three autonomous components of the Army of the United States during World War II, the others being the Army Air Forces and Army Service Forces. Throughout their existence, Army Ground Forces were the largest training organization ever established in the United States. Its strength of 780,000 troops on 1 May 1942 grew to a peak of 2,200,000 by 1 July 1943. Thereafter its strength declined as units departed for overseas theaters.

== Origins ==
Army Ground Forces traced its origins back to mobilization plans created as early as 1921 as a headquarters for directing US field armies overseas, similar to that of the American Expeditionary Forces in World War I.

General Headquarters was constituted in the Regular Army on 15 August 1927 and allotted to the Adjutant General for mobilization responsibility. It was partially organized 9 August 1932 at Washington, D.C. GHQ (Initial) (Enlisted) was allotted 1 October 1933 to the Second Corps Area for the mobilization of enlisted personnel. The Adjutant General retained mobilization responsibility for officer personnel. The GHQ (Initial) (Enlisted) was further allotted 2 September 1939 to the Trenton (New Jersey) Military District. The headquarters was partially activated on 26 July 1940 at the United States Army War College, Washington, D.C. The Headquarters Company, GHQ, was constituted 8 July 1941 and activated 14 July 1941 at the Army War College.

The Army's Chief of Staff was designated as the commanding general of GHQ. After the activation of GHQ, General George C. Marshall chose to exercise actual command of the Army's tactical units through the War Department General Staff rather than through GHQ. Marshall delegated only the training functions to GHQ and charged its chief of staff Lieutenant General (later Major General) Lesley J. McNair with the authority for supervision of the training of the Army's mobile units. However, since Marshall saw McNair infrequently and seldom visited GHQ, it was in practice McNair who directed GHQ.

As World War II approached, the role of GHQ remained a training function and a few months after Pearl Harbor, the command was redesignated as HQ, Army Ground Forces in recognition of its revised mission. The concept of a general headquarters was not realized in practice because the war was fought in many theaters, so overall direction was exercised by the War Department's General Staff. GHQ also did not become the equivalent of a theater command for the Zone of Interior; administrative authority was exercised by the G-4 of the War Department's General Staff through the Corps Areas and Service Commands. Instead, GHQ was drawn into the enormous task of raising and training an army.

In March 1942, there was a sweeping reorganization of the Army that reduced the number of officers reporting to the chief of staff. Under Executive Order 9082 "Reorganizing the Army and the War Department" of 28 February 1942 and War Department Circular No. 59 of 2 March 1942, GHQ became Headquarters, Army Ground Forces, and opened at the Army War College on 9 March 1942. The posts of the chiefs of the four traditional combat arms – Infantry, Cavalry, Field Artillery, and Coast Artillery – were abolished and their functions, duties, and powers were transferred to the Army Ground Forces. McNair also became responsible for four new "pseudo-arms" – airborne, armor, anti-aircraft and tank destroyer. He had the power to reorganize the ground army, cutting across traditional lines without branch rivalries.

Since later commands, such as the Continental Army Command and Forces Command were redesignations of their predecessors, they celebrated their birthday as 9 March 1942, the day Army Ground Forces were established.

== Organization of ground troops ==
In 1942, it was estimated that between 200 and 350 divisions would be required to defeat Germany and Japan. However, only 89 divisions were ultimately readied. This was partially because requirements for service troops and overhead was greater than anticipated, and because the Army's overall strength became fixed at a lower level than expected. Army strength was fixed at 7,500,000 enlisted men in 1942 and was subsequently cut to 7,004,000 enlisted men in 1943. Further cuts of 433,000 men were made by March 1945. As a result, divisions scheduled for activation in the second half of 1943 were postponed to 1944, then canceled entirely, and no new divisions were formed after June 1943.

By May 1945, 96% of all tactical troops were overseas. No new units were forming and there were no reserves. These sufficed to bring about the defeat of Germany and Japan, largely because the Soviet Union carried most of the burden of fighting the German Army on the Eastern Front. However, it also meant that divisions were kept in the line longer than anticipated and took heavier casualties. In three months of intensive combat, an infantry division could expect 100% casualties in its three infantry regiments. Units were maintained by a continuous flow of individual replacements. Such conditions placed great strain on the combat soldier who remained in action until he became a casualty.

Energetic and painstaking efforts were made by Army Ground Forces to optimize the divisions for combat operations. Non-essential troops and equipment were eliminated. The principle was established that a unit would have only the equipment that it would normally need. Other economies were also made. For example, trucks were replaced, wherever possible, by trailers. While admittedly not as useful as trucks, not only were they cheaper to produce, but they required fewer personnel to maintain, and less space to ship. As a result of economies, 89 divisions were active in 1945 for the same number of personnel as required to man 75 in 1943. General Douglas MacArthur pointed out that the division, while initially well-balanced, soon became unbalanced in combat as the infantry took casualties faster than other arms, requiring the relief of the entire division when most of its components were capable of further effort.

This eventually brought the entire training program down. In 1941, replacements were produced by Replacement Training Centers (RTCs). As new divisions were mobilized, they took their manpower directly from reception centers. The RTCs provided replacements for filler, and were organized to provide replacements in the proportion of units in the army. Army Ground Forces was responsible for training replacements for the four statutory arms (infantry, cavalry, field and coast artillery) and the three new pseudo-arms (armor, antiaircraft artillery, and tank destroyer). Replacements for the other arms and services were handled by the Army Service Forces. Casualties in combat units, particularly infantry units, exceeded the capacity of the RTCs to replace them. By February 1944, some 35,249 men had been taken from combat units in training for use as replacements; another 29,521 had been transferred from low priority units to fill up units preparing to move overseas. Between April and September 1944, as casualties in Normandy began to bite, some 91,747 men were stripped from twenty-two divisions in the United States. Maintaining 700,000 men in infantry units required 1,800,000 men in the infantry arm by April 1945. Over 1,000,000 replacements were shipped between September 1943 and August 1945, of whom 82% were infantry. Volunteers for the infantry were accepted from other arms and services. By 1944, all new inductees were being sent to RTCs, where they were trained for 13 to 17 weeks before being sent to combat units. As casualties mounted, a massive comb-out began as the Army Ground Forces struggled to provide replacements. Personnel from non-combat assignments were pulled from duty, hastily trained, and then reassigned to units as combat infantry replacements.

The result was that divisions embarking for overseas in late 1944 and early 1945 had much less training than those leaving earlier. The last division to depart for overseas, the 65th Infantry Division, fared worst of all:

If the plans for building and training this division had been carried out as originally laid down by General McNair and his staff, the 65th when it moved overseas in 1945 might have been the most battleworthy of the long line of divisions produced by the Army Ground Forces. For into the planning of the organization, training, and equipment of this unit was poured the accumulated experience of four years' intensive effort. But, mainly because of personnel exigencies the control of which lay beyond the jurisdiction of the Army Ground Forces, the 65th was about the least ready for combat of all divisions trained in World War II. Its regiments had never worked with their supporting battalions of artillery in field exercises. The division commander had never maneuvered his command as a unit; in fact, the division had never been together, except for reviews and demonstrations, and its composition had changed greatly from one assembly to another. In the infantry regiments, only one man in four had been with the division for a year, and almost every fourth man had joined his unit within the past three months. The division was more of a hodgepodge than a team.

=== Special divisions ===
In 1942, the 4th, 6th, 7th, 8th, 9th and 90th Infantry Divisions were converted to motorized divisions, intended to operate with armored divisions, similar to the German Panzergrenadier divisions. These divisions had more transport than regular infantry divisions. However the proportion of infantry in the armored divisions was increased in 1943, and the regular infantry division actually had sufficient transport if trucks were taken from other duties, so the additional shipping space required for them did not appear worthwhile, and all were converted back to regular infantry divisions.

Three light divisions were formed, in response to combat experience in 1942 and 1943. The 10th Light Division was formed as a light division specializing in mountain warfare, the 71st Light Division as one specializing in jungle warfare, and the 89th Light Division as a light truck division. Theater commanders were lukewarm about the concept. General MacArthur felt that they had insufficient firepower, and they performed unsatisfactorily in training maneuvers, so the 71st and 89th were converted to regular infantry divisions. Despite its jungle training, the 71st Infantry Division was rushed to Europe in response to the German Ardennes Offensive. The 10th remained a special mountain division and fought as such in Italy.

=== Airborne ===
Five airborne divisions (the 11th, 13th, 17th, 82nd and 101st) were formed, but as early as the Allied invasion of Sicily (Operation Husky) in July 1943 it was apparent that there would not be sufficient troop carrier aircraft to employ them in the manner for which they had been intended. The activation of the 15th Airborne Division in 1943 was canceled, but this did nothing to reduce the disproportionate ratio of airborne to infantry divisions, as all divisions scheduled for activation in late 1943 were eventually canceled. General McNair considered converting the airborne divisions in the United States to light divisions but following the failure of the light division concept, the decision was taken to ship them as airborne divisions, cognizant of the fact that they would operate as light infantry divisions.

The European Theater of Operations (ETO) favored a larger airborne division than Army Ground Forces, developing a larger division with two parachute infantry regiments, a glider infantry regiment almost identical to a standard infantry regiment, and more support units, a total of 12,979 men. Airborne divisions in ETO were reorganized on this establishment. The 11th Airborne Division in the South West Pacific Area (SWPA) remained on the old AGF establishment. With a strength of only 8,500 men, it had one parachute infantry regiment and two smaller glider infantry regiments.

=== Anti-aircraft ===
No arm was in such urgent demand in 1942 as anti-aircraft units, and these units were shipped at high priority as soon as, and sometimes even before, they were fully trained. Once the Allied Air Forces began to get the upper hand, demand tapered off and it became apparent that anti-aircraft units had been over-produced. Many units were then broken up for infantry replacements.

=== Armor ===
While Army Ground Forces endeavored to provide the troops with the best equipment available, they were not always able to provide better equipment than the German enemy. This was particularly apparent with respect to armor. American commanders tended, when forced to make a choice, to prefer mobility to firepower. The result was a number of uninspiring designs. In particular, the M6 Heavy Tank was a dud which convinced Army Ground Forces that heavy tanks were no good and Ordnance Department that Army Ground Forces did not really want one. The M4 Sherman medium tank found itself out-performed by German tanks which began appearing in 1943. Opposition from Army Ground Forces was one of the primary factors for the late and limited introduction of the M26 Pershing into the European Theater.

In 1942, the Operations Division (OPD) of the War Department General Staff estimated that, by the end of 1943, 140 divisions would be mobilized, of which 46 would be armored. A severe shortage of shipping space, combined with Army Ground Forces doubts about whether this was the correct ratio of infantry armored units, led to this being revised downward to just 16 armored divisions actually being active in 1943.

Trimming the tables of organization of the armored divisions in 1943, Army Ground Forces cut the number of tank battalions in the armored division from six to three and reduced the number of tanks from 390 to 263. In the process, the number of non-divisional tank battalions increased to 65, permitting more combined training with the infantry divisions. Later, it became standard practice to attach a non-divisional tank battalion to each infantry division where possible. Almost 4,000 personnel were cut from the division establishment although the number of Sherman tanks was only reduced by a quarter. While the old armored division organization was cumbersome and inefficient, the new was flexible but sometimes too lean and light, requiring supplementing. All armored divisions were converted to the new tables except the 2nd and 3rd, which remained under the old, with some modifications.

=== Artillery ===
Although also frequently out-ranged by their German counterparts, American artillery built up a reputation for effectiveness and the infantry increasingly relied on the artillery to get them forward. The War Department General Staff ignored the Army Ground Forces' recommendations for a powerful heavy artillery arm, authorizing only 81 medium and 54 heavy non-divisional artillery battalions instead of the 140 and 101 recommended by Army Ground Forces, only to have combat experience in Italy prove that air power could not substitute for heavy artillery. As a result, over 100 medium and heavy artillery battalions were activated in 1944, mostly through the conversion of coast artillery units.

=== Cavalry ===
Two horse cavalry divisions existed in 1941. The 1st Cavalry Division was shipped to Australia, where it was originally envisioned that it could operate in the mounted role. However, by the time it embarked, the defense of Australia was no longer paramount and it served in the South West Pacific Area in the dismounted role. The 2nd Cavalry Division was formed twice. Originally a bi-racial division, its white components were broken up to provide troops for armored units. It was reformed as a colored division only to be broken up again to provide service units. Two non-divisional cavalry regiments served as infantry in the South West Pacific Area and China Burma India Theater. All other cavalry units were converted to the mechanized cavalry reconnaissance role. However, they only spent about 6% of their time on reconnaissance tasks, leading to a postwar consensus that either they lacked the combat power to perform their assigned role or had simply been misused altogether.

=== Tank destroyer ===
The tank destroyer arm was probably the most controversial. Tank destroyers based on the M3 Half-track proved too vulnerable in the North African campaign and a decision was made that half of all tank destroyer battalions would be equipped with towed guns, emphasizing the defensive role. This decision was reversed after the towed battalions lost large numbers of guns overrun or stuck in mud and snow during the Ardennes offensive. Later, good self-propelled gun carriages became available, but massed enemy armor became scarce and most tank destroyer units began operating as field artillery. Some 25 tank destroyer battalions were inactivated to fill depleted infantry and armoured divisions.

== Post-war ==
Army Ground Forces survived the post-war reorganization of the War Department. It became Army Field Forces in 1948, Continental Army Command (CONARC) in 1955, and was ultimately divided into United States Army Forces Command (FORSCOM) and United States Army Training and Doctrine Command (TRADOC) in 1973. FORSCOM wears the former Army Ground Forces' shoulder sleeve insignia to this day.

== Commanders ==
- Lieutenant General Lesley J. McNair 9 March 1942 – 13 July 1944
- Lieutenant General Ben Lear 14 July 1944 – 20 January 1945
- General Joseph Stilwell 21 January 1945 – 22 June 1945
- General Jacob L. Devers 29 June 1945 – 9 March 1948
