= Brian Turner Tom Lawrence =

Recipient of the Victoria Cross

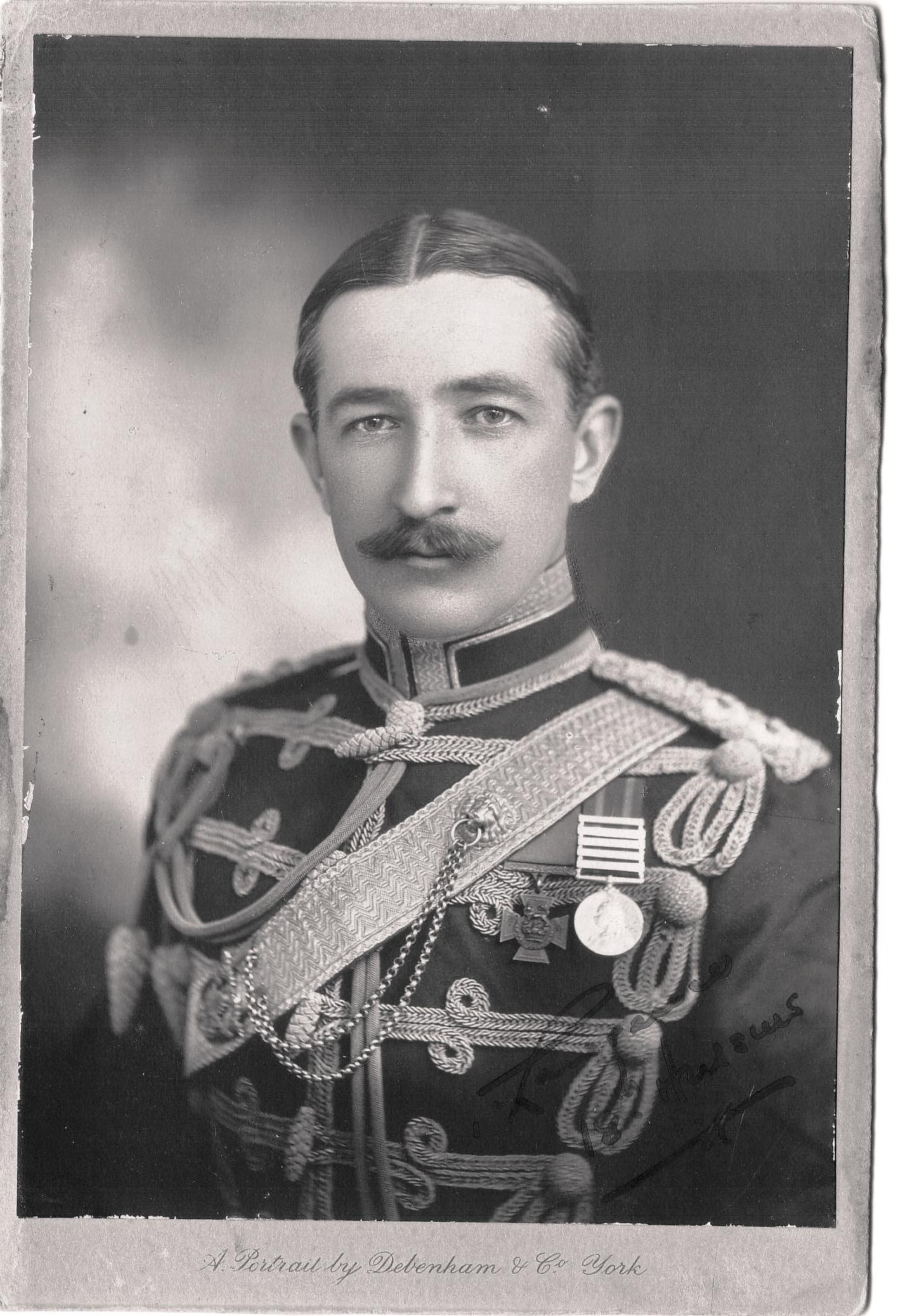
- Born: 9 November 1873; Bewdley, Worcestershire
- Died: 7 June 1949 (aged 75); Nakuru, Kenya
- Burial place: Nakuru Crematorium
- Military career
- Allegiance: United Kingdom
- Branch: British Army
- Rank: Lieutenant-Colonel
- Units: 17th Lancers; 18th Royal Hussars
- Conflicts: Second Boer War; World War I World War II
- Awards: Victoria Cross; King Faisal War Medal (Iraq)
- Other work: Eventing competitor for Great Britain in the 1912 Summer Olympics

Brian Turner Tom Lawrence VC (9 November 1873 – 7 June 1949) was an English recipient of the Victoria Cross, the highest and most prestigious award for gallantry in the face of the enemy that can be awarded to British and Commonwealth forces. He also competed at the 1912 Summer Olympics.

== Life ==
He was born in Bewdley, Worcestershire, the eldest of five brothers, and the son of Hannah and John Lawrence, a timber merchant of 15, Lower Park, Bewdley. Lawrence was a former pupil of King Charles I Grammar School, Kidderminster.

Lawrence was 26 years old and a sergeant in the 17th Lancers (Duke of Cambridge's Own), British Army during the Second Boer War when the following deed took place for which he was awarded the VC.

On the 7th August 1900, when on patrol duty near Essenbosch Farm, Sergeant Lawrence and a Private Hayman were attacked by 12 or 14 Boers. Private Hayman's horse was shot, and the man was thrown, dislocating his shoulder. Sergeant Lawrence at once came to his assistance, extricated him from under the horse, put him on his own horse and sent him on to the picket. Sergeant Lawrence took the soldier's carbine and, with his own carbine as well, kept the Boers off until Private Hayman was safely out of range. He then retired for some two miles on foot, followed by the Boers, and keeping them off till assistance arrived.

Lawrence received the decoration from King Edward VII in London on 12 August 1902, during a review of colonial troops present for the coronation of the King.

== Later military career ==
Lawrence later served in World War I and early in World War II and reached the rank of lieutenant-colonel in the 18th Royal Hussars (later 13th/18th Royal Hussars).

== Olympics ==
He competed in the 1912 Summer Olympics for Great Britain in eventing. He did not finish the Individual eventing (Military) competition, also the British team did not finish the team event.

== The medal ==
The medal is displayed at the Lord Ashcroft VC Gallery in the Imperial War Museum in London.

== Sources ==
- Monuments to Courage (David Harvey, 1999)
- The Register of the Victoria Cross (This England, 1997)
- Victoria Crosses of the Anglo-Boer War (Ian Uys, 2000)
