= Hagge =

- Location within Dalarna Location within Sweden
- Coordinates: 60°07′N 15°16′E
- Country: Sweden
- Province: Dalarna
- County: Dalarna County
- Municipality: Smedjebacken Municipality

Area
  - Total: 0.50 km^{2} (0.19 sq mi)

Population (31 December 2010)
  - Total: 342
  - Density: 677/km^{2} (1,750/sq mi)
- Time zone: UTC+1 (CET)
  - Summer (DST): UTC+2 (CEST)

Hagge is a locality situated in Smedjebacken Municipality, Dalarna County, Sweden, with 342 inhabitants in 2010.

Axel Nordlander, An Equestrian & Officer, was born here
