= Sergey Zagorsky =

Russian equestrian

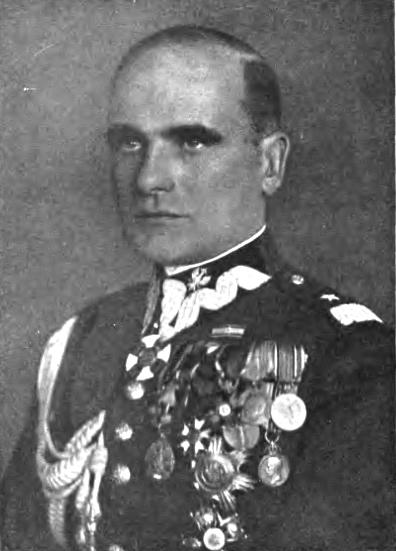
- Sergiusz Zahorski, photo taken before 1932.

Personal information
- Nationality: Russian
- Born: 4 September 1886; Zhytomyr, Ukraine
- Died: 4 June 1962 (aged 75); Willesden, London, England

Sport
- Sport: Equestrian

Sergey Zagorsky (4 September 1886 – 4 June 1962) was a Russian equestrian. He competed in the individual jumping at the 1912 Summer Olympics.
