= Gaston Seigner =

French equestrian

Medal record

Equestrian

Representing France

Olympic Games
Silver medal – second place	1912 Stockholm	Team jumping

Gaston Seigner (22 April 1878 in Moulins, Allier – 26 April 1918 in Mont-Rouge, Belgium) was a French equestrian and Olympic medalist. He competed in show jumping at the 1912 Summer Olympics, where he won a silver medal with the French team, along with Pierre Dufour d'Astafort, Jacques Cariou and Ernest Meyer. He also competed in eventing and placed fourth with the French team and fourteenth in the individual contest.

As a Capitaine of the 4e régiment de dragons during the First World War, he was killed in action on 26 April 1918 aged 40 near Mont-Rouge, Belgium.
