= John Montgomery (equestrian) =

American equestrian

Jack Montgomery
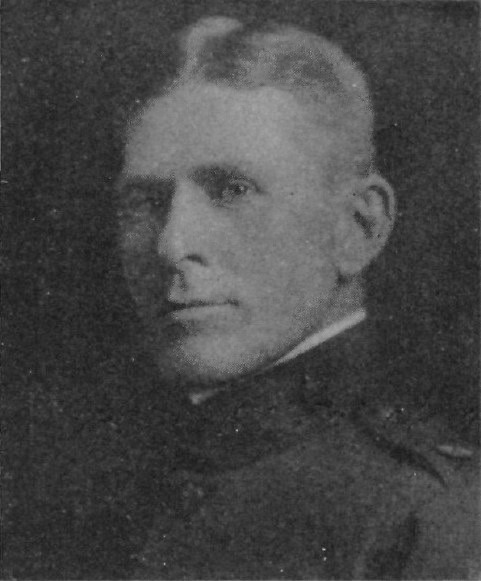

Medal record

Representing the United States

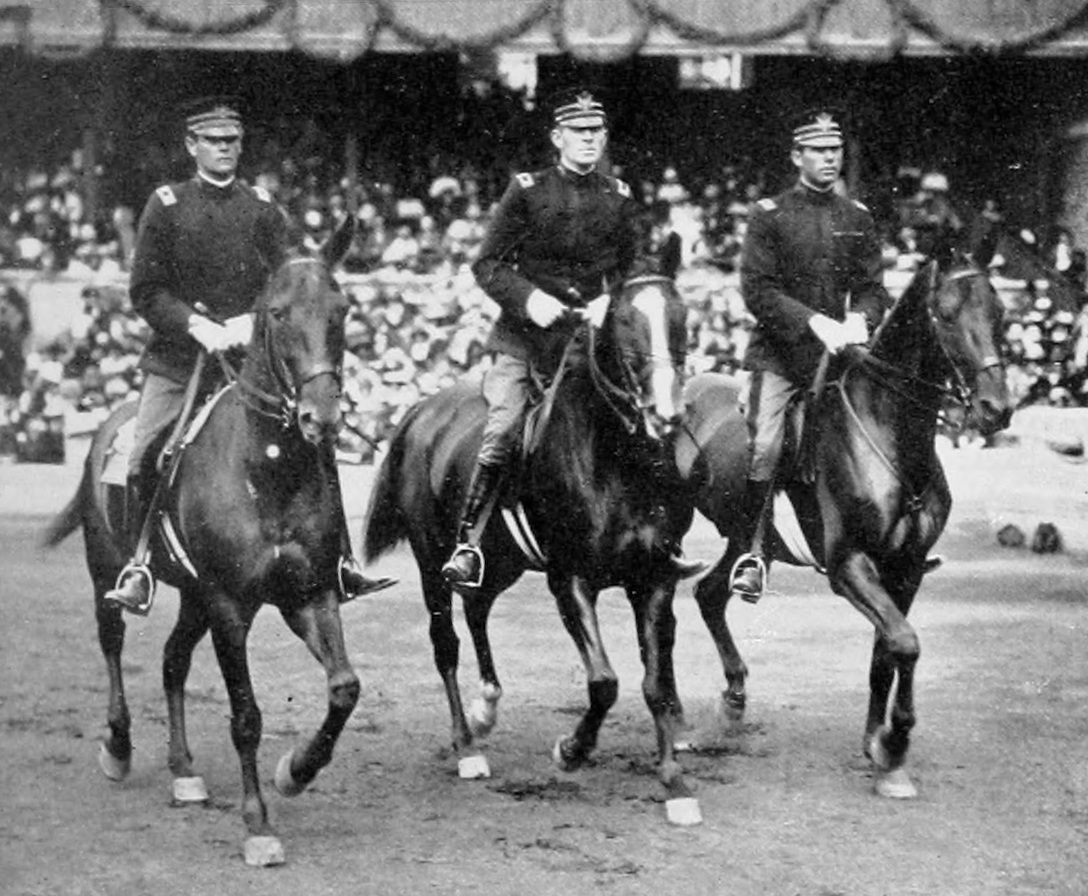
Jack Montgomery (center) with his Olympic teammates Guy Henry (left) and Ben Lear (right) in 1912

John Carter Montgomery (Elizabethtown, Kentucky, November 22, 1881 – Washington, D.C., June 7, 1948) was an American equestrian who competed in the 1912 Summer Olympics.

Montgomery graduated from West Point in 1903 and was commissioned in the 7th Cavalry Regiment. In 1907, he married Virginia Lee, daughter of Major General Fitzhugh Lee. They had two sons and two daughters.

He was part of the American team, which won the bronze medal in the equestrian team event. In the individual competition, he finished ninth, and in the individual dressage competition, he finished twentieth. He was also part of the American team, which finished fourth in the team jumping competition. He also competed in the polo tournament at the 1920 Summer Olympics, winning a bronze medal.

During World War I, Montgomery served with the American Expeditionary Forces in France, receiving a temporary promotion to colonel and the Distinguished Service Medal. From July 2, 1924, to March 13, 1927, he was commanding officer of the 1st Squadron, 10th Cavalry at Fort Huachuca. In 1927, Montgomery retired from military service as a lieutenant colonel. In 1929, he joined First Boston Corp, retiring in 1946 as a vice president. In 1930, Montgomery was advanced to colonel on the Army retired list.

Montgomery and his wife settled in Alexandria, Virginia after he retired from First Boston. He died at Walter Reed Hospital in Washington, D.C. and was buried at Arlington National Cemetery on June 10, 1948.
