= Frode Kirkebjerg =

Danish equestrian (1888–1975)

Olympic medal record

Men's Equestrian
Silver medal – second place	1924 Paris	Individual three-day event

Frode Rasmussen Kirkebjerg (10 May 1888 in Malt, Ribe, Denmark – 12 January 1975 in Ordrup, Denmark) was a Danish sports horse rider and captain in the Danish military. He competed in the 1912 Summer Olympics on the horse Dippe-Libbeand in the 1924 Summer Olympics on the horse Meteor.

In 1912, he did not finish the Individual eventing (Military) competition. Also, the Danish team did not finish the team event. Twelve years later, he won the silver medal in the individual three-day (Military) event.

== Family ==
Frode had three children: Lars Eivind Bluun Kirkebjerg, Dorrit Kirkebjerg Dawes, and Lisbet Kirkebjerg Abrams.
