= Carl Kraft =

Danish equestrian

Personal information
- Full name: Carl Adolph Kraft
- Nationality: Danish
- Born: 7 February 1876; Copenhagen, Denmark
- Died: 11 February 1964 (aged 88); Glostrup, Denmark

Sport
- Sport: Equestrian

Carl Adolph Kraft (7 February 1876 – 11 February 1964) was a Danish equestrian. He competed in two events at the 1912 Summer Olympics.
