= Ben Lear =

United States Army General

Benjamin Lear
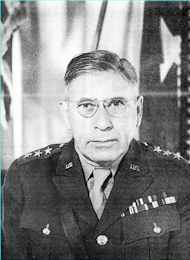
- General Ben Lear
- Born: 12 May 1879; Hamilton, Ontario, Canada
- Died: 1 November 1966 (aged 87); Murfreesboro, Tennessee, United States
- Burial place: Arlington National Cemetery, Virginia, United States
- Military career
- Allegiance: United States
- Branch: United States Army
- Service years: 1898–1945
- Rank: General
- Nickname: "Yoo Hoo"
- Service number: 0-1179
- Commands: 1st Cavalry Division (1936–1938); Pacific Sector Panama Canal Zone (1938–1940); U.S. Second Army (1940–1943); Army Ground Forces (1944–1945)
- Conflicts: Spanish–American War; Philippine–American War; World War I World War II
- Awards: Army Distinguished Service Medal (2); Silver Star

Medal record

Men's Equestrian

Representing the United States

Olympic Games
Bronze medal – third place	1912 Stockholm	Team eventing

Benjamin Lear (12 May 1879 – 1 November 1966) was a United States Army general who served in the Spanish–American War, Philippine Insurrection, World War I and World War II. He also competed at the 1912 Summer Olympics.

== Early career ==
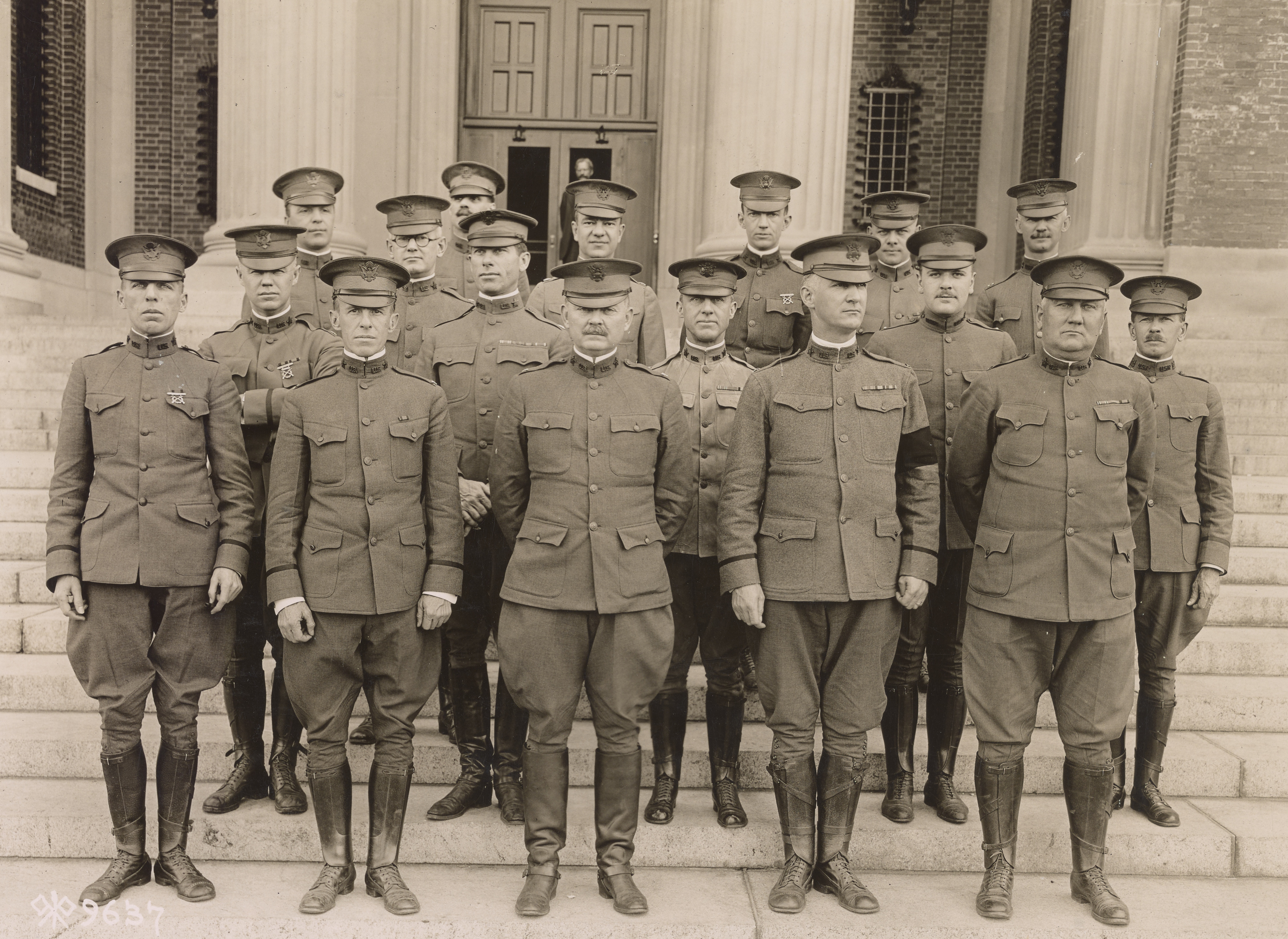
Officers of the War Plans Branch, War Plans Division, General Staff, standing outside the entrance of the Army War College at Washington, D.C., May 1918. Lieutenant Colonel Ben Lear is standing in the second row, second from the left, between Major G. P. Robinson (left) and Major W. W. McCammon (right)

Ben Lear was born in Hamilton, Ontario on 12 May 1879. His military service began in 1898, when he enlisted with the 1st Colorado Infantry, United States Volunteers, for the Spanish–American War as a first sergeant. He was promoted to second lieutenant during the Philippine–American War in the 1st Colorado and later in the 36th Infantry, USV, then joined the Regular Army as a sergeant at the end of the war. He subsequently served in World War I.

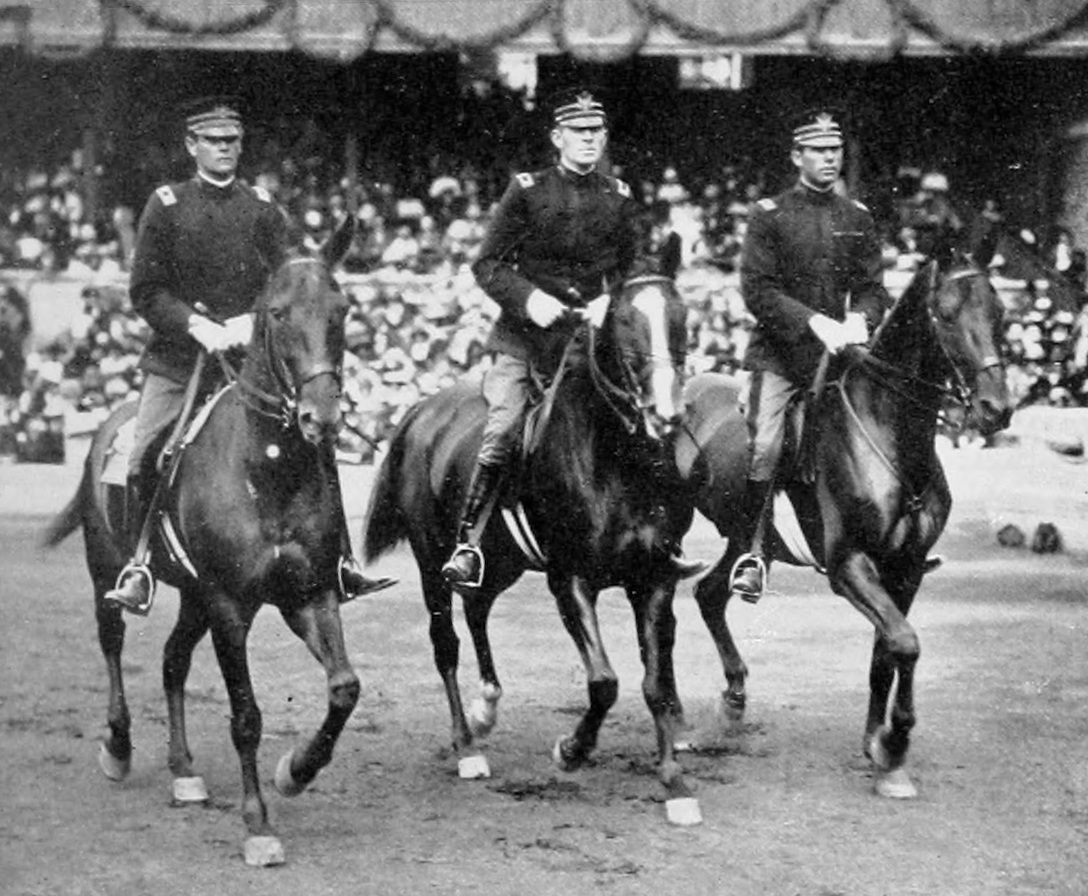
From left to right: Captain Guy V. Henry Jr., Lieutenant John C. Montgomery, Lieutenant Ben Lear at the 1912 Summer Olympics

He was a 1912 Olympian, part of the equestrian team which won the bronze medal in the three-day team event.

Lear graduated from the Army School of the Line in 1922, the Army General Staff School in 1923, and the Army War College in 1926.

He was promoted to brigadier general in May 1936 and major general in October 1938. He commanded the 1st Cavalry Division from 1936 to 1938, and the Pacific Sector of the Panama Canal Zone from 1938 to 1940.

== World War II ==
=== Stateside duty ===
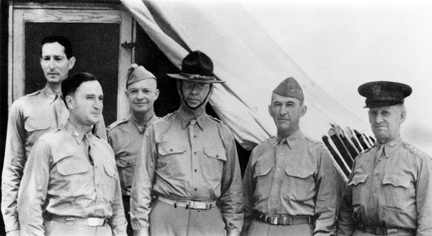
Senior officers during the Louisiana maneuvers, 1941. Left to right: Mark W. Clark, Chief of Staff, Army Ground Forces; Harry J. Malony, Chief of Staff, Second Army; Dwight D. Eisenhower, Chief of Staff, Third Army; Ben Lear, Commander Second Army; Walter Krueger, Commander Third Army; Lesley J. McNair, Commander Army Ground Forces

Lear was promoted to lieutenant general in October 1940 and was commanding general of the U.S. Second Army from 20 October 1940 to 25 April 1943. As such, he was responsible for training a large number of U.S. soldiers during World War II. He became known as a strict disciplinarian. It was in the lead-up to the Louisiana Maneuvers of 1941 that Lear acquired the nickname "Yoo-Hoo". On July 6, 1941, Lear was playing golf at a country club in Memphis, Tennessee, in civilian clothes, when a convoy of 80 U.S. Army trucks carrying men of the 110th Quartermaster Regiment, 35th Division rolled past. The troops in the passing trucks subjected a group of women in shorts to a series of whistles and "lewd and obscene" catcalls.

Lear had the convoy stopped, telling the officers that their men's conduct was unacceptable and that they had disgraced the Army. Lear's punishment was to make every one of the 350 men in the convoy march 15 miles (24 km) of the 45-mile (72 km) trip back to Camp Joseph T. Robinson, Arkansas, in three five-mile sections. Many men straggled and a number collapsed in the 97 °F (36 °C) heat. There was a storm of public criticism of Lear's actions from people who felt that the soldiers had been harshly and collectively punished when many had done nothing wrong. The commander of the 35th Division, Major General Ralph E. Truman, was well-connected politically, his cousin being Senator Harry S. Truman, and some Congressmen called for Lear to be retired. However, in the eyes of the Army, the men's actions were not a case of sexual harassment, but of indiscipline, and no action was taken against Lear. The derogatory nickname "Yoo-Hoo" stuck.

During the Louisiana Maneuvers, Lear led his Second Army against the U.S. Third Army under Lieutenant General Walter Krueger. In these maneuvers, Lear judged Truman's control and discipline of his division to be unsatisfactory, making the decision to relieve him from his command. Lear continued in command of the Second Army until he was succeeded by Lieutenant General Lloyd Fredendall in April 1943.

=== Retirement and recall to active duty ===
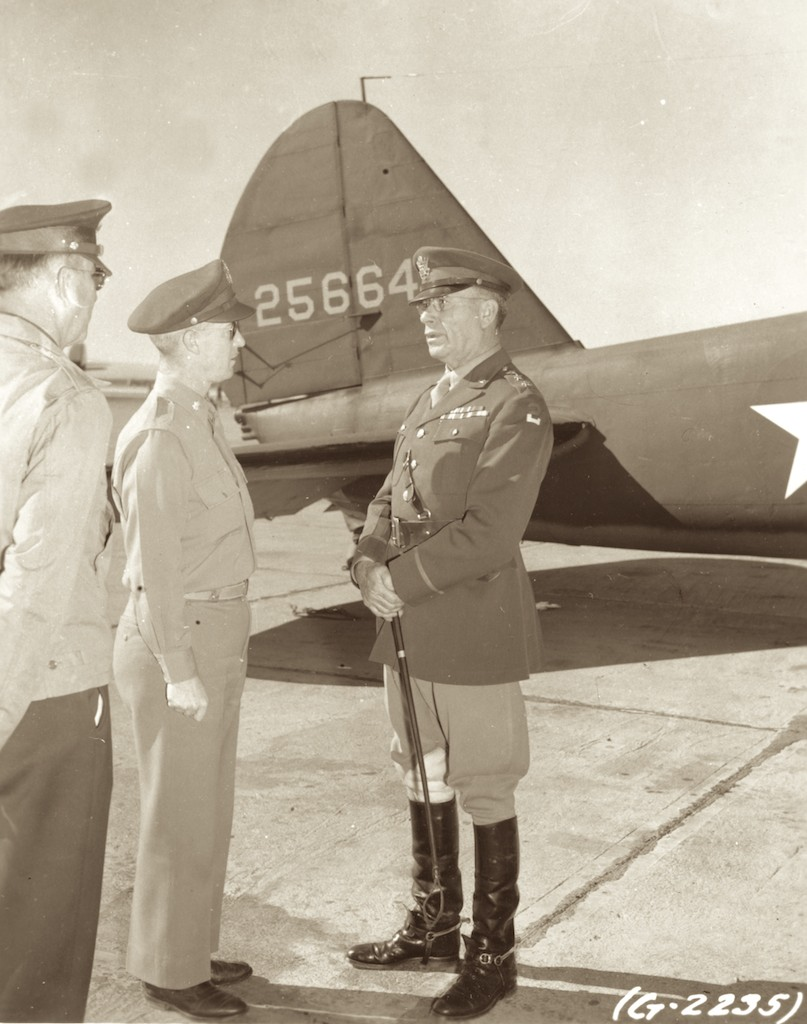
Lear on a visit to Davis-Monthan Airfield, Tucson, Arizona, 1944

Lear reached the mandatory retirement age of 64 in May 1943, but received a permanent promotion to lieutenant general on the retired list and was ordered back to active duty to serve on the Personnel Board of the Secretary of War. He became Commanding General of the Army Ground Forces on 14 July 1944, shortly before Lieutenant General Lesley J. McNair, his predecessor, was killed by friendly fire in Normandy on 25 July 1944.

After the German counter-attacks in the Ardennes intensifed the European Theater's manpower problems, Lear was appointed deputy commander of the European Theater of Operations, US Army, in January 1945. In part, he was responsible for the theater's manpower policies, and began to institute an overhaul of its replacement system; the war against Germany ended before the full benefits of his reforms could be realized, however.

== Retirement ==
Lear fully retired from the army in July 1945 and was promoted to four-star general on 19 July 1954 by a special act of Congress (Public Law 83-508). He settled in Memphis, Tennessee, after his retirement.

He died at the Veterans Administration Hospital in Murfreesboro, Tennessee on 1 November 1966 and was buried on 3 November 1966 in Arlington National Cemetery, Section 4, Grave 2690.

== Decorations and medals ==
Army Distinguished Service Medal with one Oak Leaf Cluster
Silver Star
Spanish War Service Medal
Philippine Campaign Medal
Army of Cuban Occupation Medal
Army of Cuban Pacification Medal
Mexican Border Service Medal
World War I Victory Medal
American Defense Service Medal
American Campaign Medal
European-African-Middle Eastern Campaign Medal with three service stars
World War II Victory Medal
Army of Occupation Medal
Legion of Honour, Commandeur

== Promotions ==
No pin insignia in 1898	First sergeant, Volunteer Army: 1 May 1898
No pin insignia in 1899	Second lieutenant, Volunteer Army: 1 April 1899
	First lieutenant, Volunteer Army: 12 July 1899
No pin insignia in 1901	Second lieutenant, United States Army: 12 June 1901
	First lieutenant, United States Army: 9 December 1901
	Captain, United States Army: 10 August 1912
	Major, National Army: 5 August 1917
	Lieutenant colonel, National Army: 26 January 1918
	Colonel, temporary: 31 August 1918
	Captain, Regular Army: 25 September 1919
	Lieutenant colonel, Regular Army: 1 July 1920
	Colonel, Regular Army: 19 September 1929
	Brigadier general, Regular Army: 1 May 1936
	Major general, Regular Army: 1 October 1938
	Lieutenant general, temporary: 1 October 1940
	Lieutenant general, Retired List: 1 June 1943
	General, Retired List: 19 July 1954

Military offices
Preceded by Lesley J. McNair	Commanding General of U.S. Army Ground Forces; 14 July 1944 to 20 January 1945	Succeeded by Joseph Stilwell
