= Rabod von Kröcher =

German equestrian (1880–1945)

Olympic medal record

Men's Equestrian
Silver medal – second place	1912 Stockholm	Individual jumping

Rabod Wilhelm von Kröcher (30 June 1880 – 25 December 1945) was a German horse rider who competed in the 1912 Summer Olympics. He won the silver medal in the equestrian individual jumping with his horse “Dohna”.
