= Axel Nordlander =

Swedish equestrian

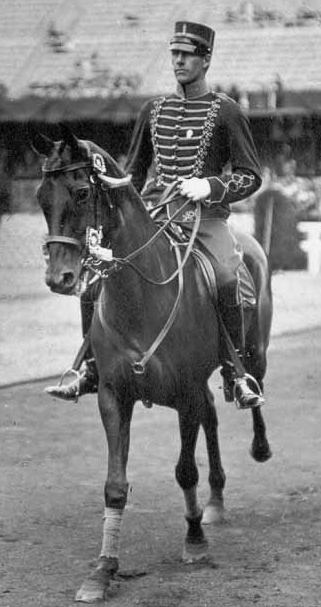
- Nordlander and Lady Artist in 1912
- Born: Axel Nils August Nordlander; 21 September 1879; Hagge bruk, Sweden
- Died: 30 April 1962 (aged 82)
- Military career
- Branch: Swedish Army
- Service years: 1900–1946
- Rank: Cavalry captain
- Units: Scanian Hussar Regiment (1906–25); Scanian Cavalry Regiment (1929–46)

Medal record

Men's equestrian

Representing Sweden

Olympic Games
Gold medal – first place	1912 Stockholm	Individual eventing
Gold medal – first place	1912 Stockholm	Team eventing

Axel Nils August Nordlander (21 September 1879 – 30 April 1962) was a Swedish cavalry officer and horse rider. He competed at the 1912 Summer Olympics and won the individual and team eventing competitions on the mare Lady Artist.
