= Nils Adlercreutz =

Swedish equestrian

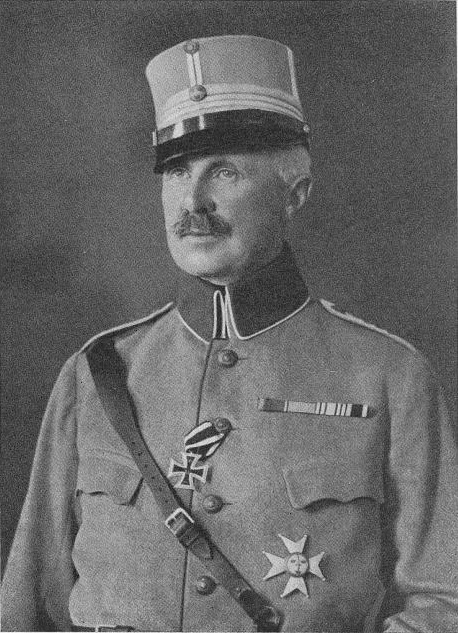
- Born: Nils August Domingo Adlercreutz; 8 July 1866; Brunneby, Sweden
- Died: 27 September 1955 (aged 89); Stockholm, Sweden
- Relatives: Gregor Adlercreutz (son)
- Military career
- Allegiance: Sweden
- Branch: Swedish Army
- Service years: 1890–1928
- Rank: Colonel
- Commands: Småland Hussar Regiment; Scanian Dragoon Regiment

Nils August Domingo Adlercreutz (8 July 1866 – 27 September 1955) was a Swedish Army officer and horse rider who competed in the 1912 Summer Olympics.

== Career ==
Adlercreutz was born on 8 July 1866 in Brunneby, Motala Municipality, Sweden, the son of lieutenant Nikolas Adlercreutz and his wife countess Augusta (née Gyldenstolpe).

== Career ==
Adlercreutz was commissioned as an officer in 1890 and was assigned as a underlöjtnant to the Life Guards of Horse (K 1) where he was promoted to lieutenant in 1896. Adlercreutz served as regimental quartermaster from 1904 to 1906 and as a teacher at the Swedish Army Riding and Horse-Driving School in Strömsholm from 1906 to 1908. The same year he was promoted to ryttmästare. Adlercreutz was military attaché in Berlin from 1912 to 1918 and was major in Scanian Dragoon Regiment (K 6) in 1914.

He was promoted to lieutenant colonel in 1917 and to colonel in 1918 and at the same time appointed commanding officer of Småland Hussar Regiment (K 4) in 1918. Adlercreutz was then commanding officer of the Scanian Dragoon Regiment from 1921 to 1927. He retired from the army the year after. In parallel to his military career, he also served as secretary of Stockholm Field Riding Club and as a judge at Ulriksdal's Racecourse.

=== 1912 Summer Olympics ===
He and his horse Atout finished fourth in the individual eventing competition and won a gold medal with the Swedish team. He also finished sixth in the individual jumping with another horse Ilex.

== Personal life ==
In 1896 he married Ebba Cederschiöld (born 1873), the daughter of major Henrik Cederschiöld and Amelie Sterky. Adlercreutz and his wife had four children, including the son Gregor, who also became an Olympic equestrian.

== Death ==
Adlercreutz died on 27 September 1955 in Stockholm and was buried at Norra begravningsplatsen in Solna.

== Dates of rank ==
- 1890 – Underlöjtnant
- 1896 – Lieutenant
- 1908 – Ryttmästare
- 1914 – Major
- 1917 – Lieutenant Colonel
- 1918 – Colonel

== Awards and decorations ==
=== Swedish ===
- (Sweden) Commander 1st Class of the Order of the Sword
- (Sweden) Knight of the Order of Vasa
- (Sweden) King Gustaf V's Olympic Commemorative Medal

=== Foreign ===
- (Belgium) Military Cross First Class
- (Kingdom of Prussia) 2nd Class of the Iron Cross
- (Kingdom of Prussia) Knight 3rd Class of the Order of the Crown
- (Russian Empire) Knight 3rd Class of the Order of Saint Anna
- (Kingdom of Saxony) Knight 1st Class of the Albert Order
- (Austrian Empire) Knight of the Order of Franz Joseph
- Gold medal at the 1912 Olympic Games

== Honours ==
- Member of the Royal Swedish Academy of War Sciences (1923)
