= Ernst Casparsson =

Swedish equestrian

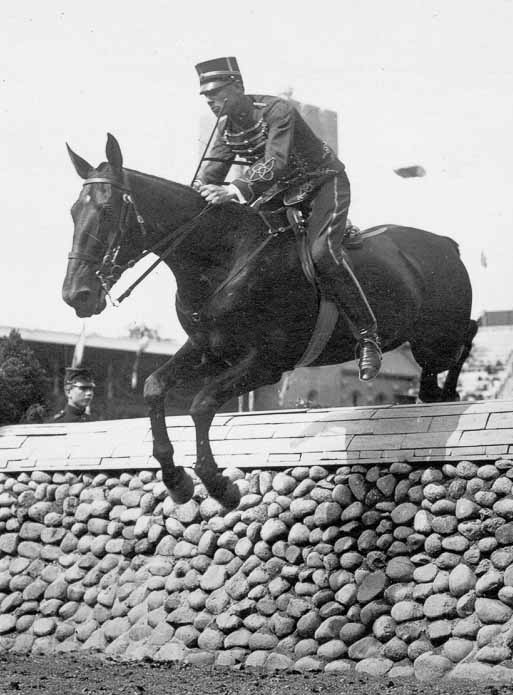
- Casparsson at the 1912 Olympics

Personal information
- Full name: Ernst Gustaf Casparsson
- Born: 15 November 1886 Krokek, Norrköping, Sweden
- Died: 7 September 1973 (aged 86) Kolmården, Norrköping, Sweden

Sport
- Sport: Horse riding
- Club: K4 IF, Umeå
Medal record
Representing Sweden
Olympic Games
Gold medal – first place	1912 Stockholm	Team eventing

Ernst Gustaf Casparsson (15 November 1886 – 7 September 1973) was a Swedish equestrian who competed in the 1912 Summer Olympics. He and his horse Irmelin finished fifth in the individual eventing competition and won a gold medal with the Swedish eventing team. He also finished sixth in the individual jumping event on the horse Kiriki.

Casparsson was born in a family of seven siblings and grew up on his father's farm in Kolmården. One of his brothers, Otto, became a prominent actor, and sister Elsa was an artist. In 1921 Casparsson purchased the farm, which by then was in a financial trouble, and managed to repay its debt by working both as a farmer and a military officer. In 1924 he married a woman 14 years his junior; the couple had four boys.
