= Pierre Dufour d'Astafort =

French equestrian

Medal record

Equestrian

Representing France

Olympic Games
Silver medal – second place	1912 Stockholm	Team jumping

Pierre Dufour d'Astafort (6 February 1886 – 11 November 1957) was a French equestrian and Olympic medalist. He was born in Le Mans, the son of Baron François Dufour d'Astafort and Marguerite de Cantillon. He competed in show jumping at the 1912 Summer Olympics, where he won a silver medal with the French team, along with Gaston Seigner, Jacques Cariou and Ernest Meyer. He also competed in eventing, and placed fourth with the French team.
