= Ephraim Graham =

American equestrian

Olympic medal record

Men's Equestrian
Bronze medal – third place	1912 Stockholm	Team eventing

Ephraim Foster Graham (Nashville, Tennessee August 10, 1888 – Fort Sam Houston, Texas, December 23, 1962) was an American horse rider who competed in the 1912 Summer Olympics.

Graham graduated from West Point in 1903, and was commissioned in the 10th Cavalry Regiment.

In 1912, he competed in the military riding event for the U.S. Military team. He and his horse, Connie, won the bronze medal as members of the American team in the team eventing after finishing twelfth in the individual eventing competition.
