= Emmanuel de Blommaert =

Belgian equestrian

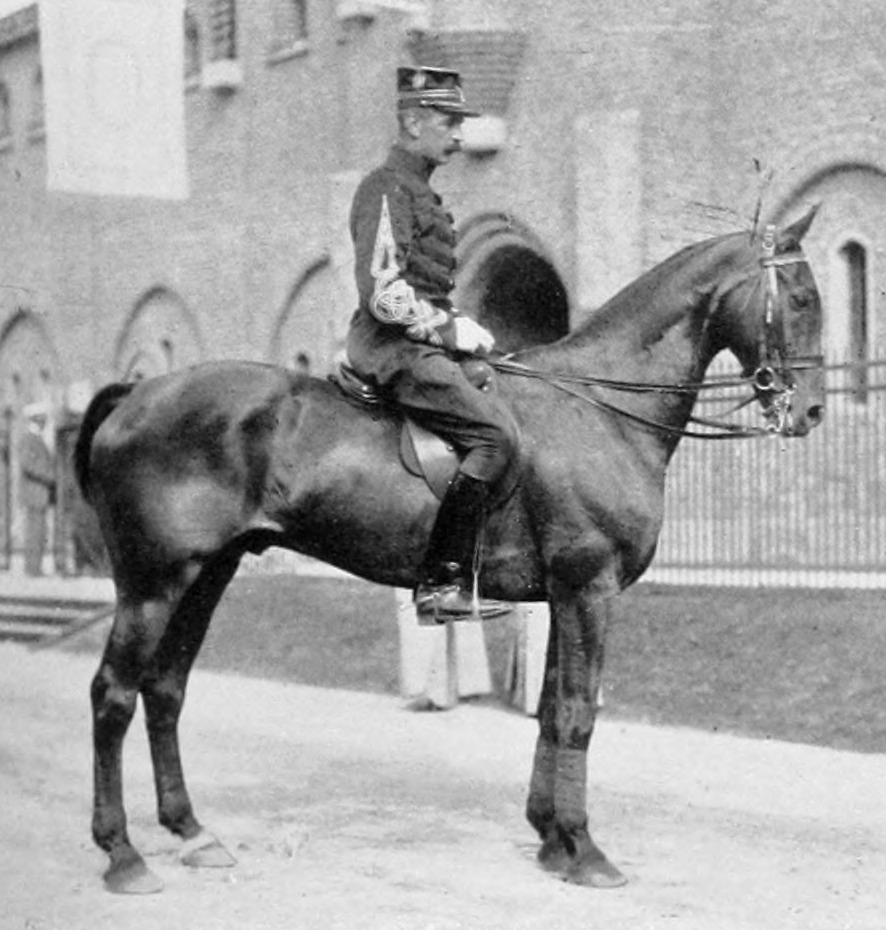
- Emmanuel de Blommaert at the 1912 Olympics

Personal information
- Born: 15 October 1875 Blicquy, Hainaut, Belgium
- Died: 12 April 1944 (aged 68) Mazy, Namur, Belgium

Sport
- Sport: Horse riding
Medal record
Representing Belgium
Olympics
| Bronze medal – third place | 1912 Stockholm | Individual jumping |

Emmanuel de Blommaert de Soye (15 October 1875 – 12 April 1944) was a Belgian horse rider who competed in the 1912 and 1920 Summer Olympics. In 1912 he won the bronze medal in the individual jumping competition, riding Clomore, and finished sixths with the Belgian team in the team jumping event. In the individual dressage competition he was 21st. In the individual eventing contest, he was disqualified in the cross country ride, and the Belgian team was unplaced in the team eventing competition, when none of their riders were able to finish.

Eight years later, he and his horse Grizzly finished eleventh in the individual dressage event.
