= Fältrittklubben =

Equestrian club in Stockholm, Sweden

Coordinates: 59.351637°N 18.085985°E

Fältrittklubben (more specifically Stockholms fältrittklubb) or the Stockholm Cross Country Riding Club is an equestrian club located in Stockholm, Sweden, established in 1886 by Prince Carl, Duke of Västergötland. During the 1912 Summer Olympics, it hosted the endurance trials for the equestrian eventing competition.

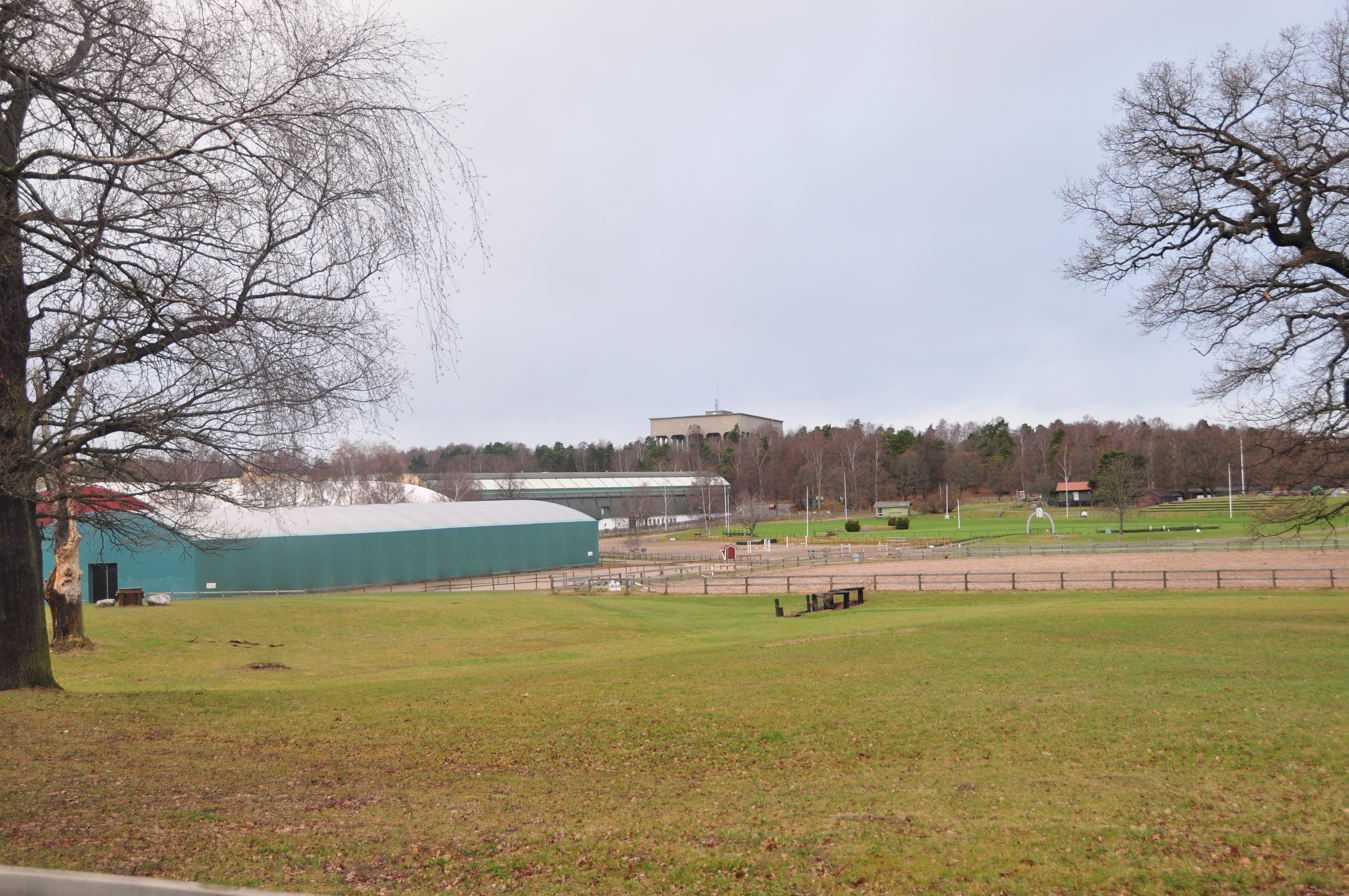
Stockholms fältrittklubb vid Storängsvägen
