= Edward Radcliffe-Nash =

English soldier and equestrian

Edward Radcliffe-Nash (9 June 1888 – 21 February 1915) was a British soldier and horse rider who competed in the 1912 Summer Olympics. He was killed in action during World War I.

== Early life and education ==
He was born in London on 9 June 1888 to Lieutenant-Colonel Edward Nash JP, late the Essex Regiment, of Ballycarty, Tralee, Co. Kerry, and Constance, daughter of John Radcliffe JP of Moorfield Withington.

He was educated at Mr. Bulls Preparatory School, Westgate on Sea (1898–1902), Eton (1902 – July 1905) and the Royal Military College, Sandhurst, into which he passed by the entrance exams on 15 August 1905 with the position of 119 from a cadetship of 196, receiving 7,838 marks. He commenced his period at the Royal Military College in September 1905. Edward Radcliffe Nash left Eton at the earliest possible moment (giving up all that Eton could give him over the next two years) to enroll at Sandhurst to enable him to gain seniority in the Army. In July 1906, Nash passed out of Sandhurst with the position of 87 from 218 cadets.

== Military career ==
On 29 August 1906, Edward Radcliffe Nash was gazetted a 2nd lieutenant into the 16th Lancers and joined his regiment on 3 October 1906. He was promoted to lieutenant on 15 January 1909 and captain on 10 October 1914. Nash qualified at the School of Musketry in their examinations on 14 October 1910.

With the outbreak of the First World War, Nash was sent to France with the British Expeditionary Force (BEF) in August 1914. He took part in the retreat from Mons, the First Battle of the Marne, the First Battle of the Aisne, and the First Battle of Ypres. He was killed in action near Ypres on 21 February 1915, aged 26, when the 16th Lancers suffered severely through the blowing up of a trench. At the time of his death, he was acting adjutant of his regiment. Captain Edward Radcliffe Nash was mentioned in dispatches by Lord John French on 8 October 1914.

In De Ruvigny’s Roll Of Honour 1914–1924 it is said that : - “As conspicuous for dash, energy and endurance in War as in sport, he was the ideal cavalry officer and appeared to have a distinguished career before him. His exuberant vitality found expression in all that he said or did, and one who knew him well observed on hearing that he had been killed: “Of all the deaths in this war, his death is the hardest to realise”.”

Captain Edward Radcliffe Nash is buried in the Ypres Town Cemetery, Ypres, West Flanders, Belgium, Row G, Grave 4.

Captain Edward Radcliffe Nash had a younger brother, Llewellyn Charles Nash (a Captain in the King’s Royal Rifle Corps), who died of wounds on 28 September 1915.

== Sporting career ==
Edward Radcliffe Nash was a splendid all round sportsman. He distinguished himself at Eton as a long distance runner and as a “wet bob”. In 1905, he won the Junior Sculls and stroked his Junior House Four up to “head”, the last time that the colours of Miss Evan’s were seen on the river.

While at Sandhurst, he proved himself to be a remarkable athlete, winning against competitors considerably older than himself in the equivalent of the “Victor Ludorum” cup. After joining the 16th Lancers, he ran twice in the Army Championship for the mile, being second on both occasions with practically no training. However, he devoted himself to riding. He was well known at Olympia and represented Britain at the Stockholm Olympic Games in 1912. He did not finish the Individual eventing (Military) competition, also the British team did not finish the team event. However, in the individual jumping event he finished 29th on The Flea.

He was first and second in successive years at the Grafton Pont-to-Point, won his Regimental Light Weight Steeplechase on two occasions and was “placed” at a number of other meetings at which he rode.

== See also ==
- List of Olympians killed in World War I
