= Chiswell (horse) =

Horse owned by the United States Army

Chiswell was a horse owned by the United States Army.

Chiswell was foaled in about 1905. The gelding was among several horses purchased in 1911 by a syndicate of New York civilian horsemen for donation to the U.S. Army for use as show horses. That year, he was selected for inclusion in the U.S. Army team sent to the Olympia London International Horse Show. The next year, he participated in the 1912 Summer Olympics, the United States equestrian team that year being fielded by the United States Cavalry. Ridden by Guy Henry, he placed 11th in dressage and fourth in jumping. He would go on to win a number of awards at other shows.

Shortly before his retirement, Chiswell was struck by an automobile and thereafter euthanized.
