= Carl von Moers =

German equestrian (1871–1957)

Olympic medal record

Men's Equestrian
Silver medal – second place	1912 Stockholm	Team eventing

Carl von Moers (9 December 1871 – 26 May 1957) was a German horse rider, born in Neuwied, who competed in the 1912 Summer Olympics.

He and his horse May-Queen won the silver medal as member of the German team in the team eventing after finishing 15th in the individual eventing competition. Von Moers also participated in the individual dressage event with his horse New Bank. They finished twelfth.
