= Henric Horn af Åminne =

Swedish equestrian

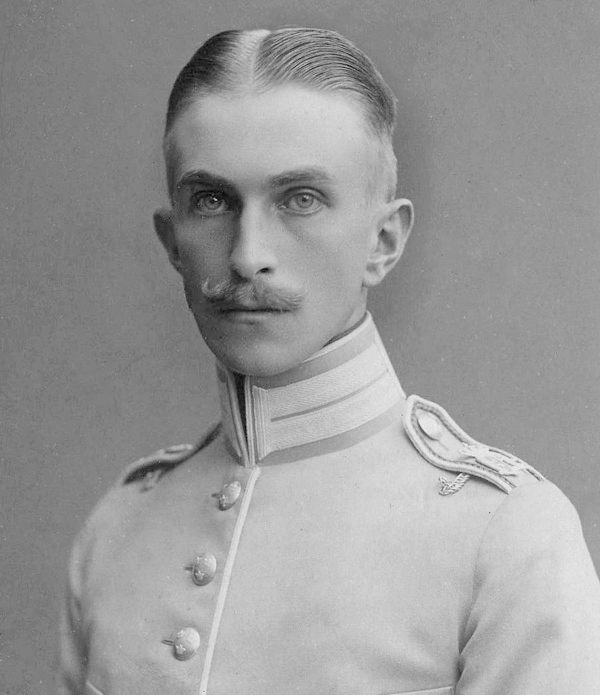

Personal information
- Born: 12 March 1880 Stockholm, Sweden
- Died: 6 December 1947 (aged 67) Stockholm, Sweden

Sport
- Sport: Horse riding
- Club: K6 IF, Ystad

Henric Arvid Bengt Christer Horn af Åminne (12 March 1880 – 6 December 1947) was a Swedish Army officer and horse rider who competed in the 1912 Summer Olympics. He finished tenth in the individual eventing on the horse Omen. Although his team finished first, Horn af Åminne did not receive a gold medal, because only three best members of each team were counted, and he was the fourth.

Horn af Åminne was ryttmästare in the Swedish Army.
