= Friedrich von Rochow =

German equestrian

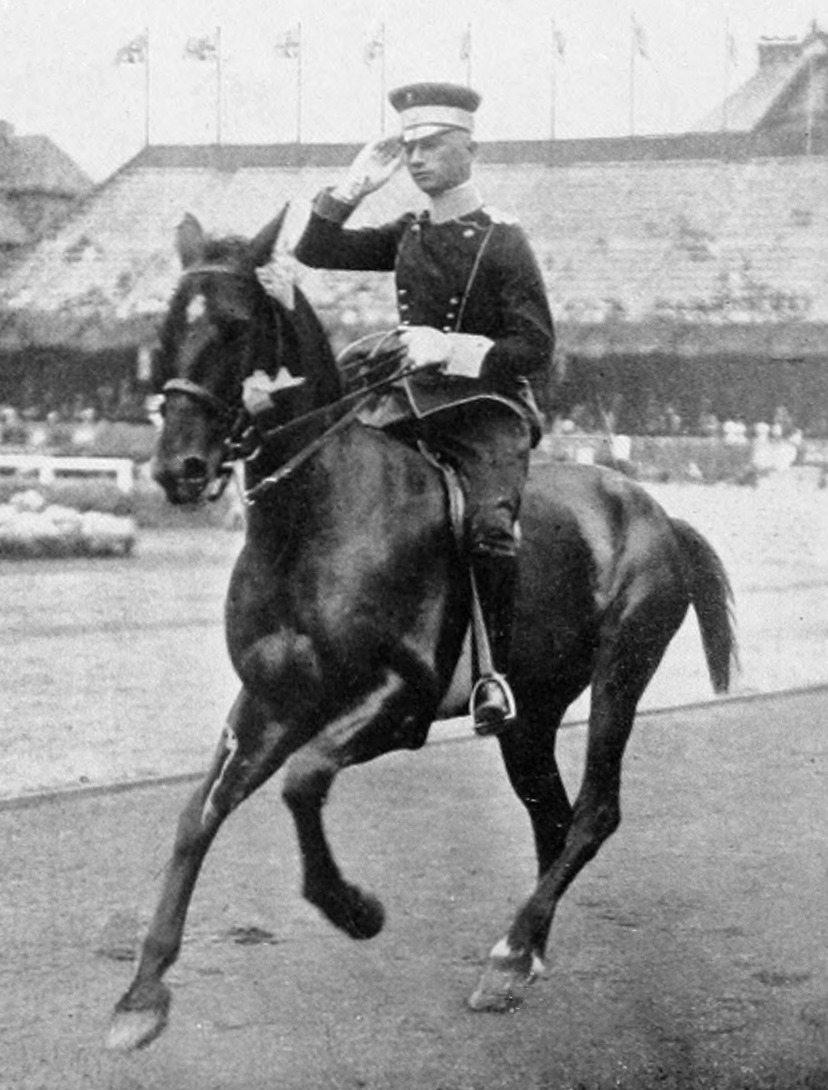
- von Rochow and Idealist in 1912

Personal information
- Born: 12 August 1881 Kloster Lehnin, German Empire
- Died: 17 August 1945 (aged 64) Kloster Lehnin, Allied-occupied Germany
Medal record
Men's Equestrian
Silver medal – second place	1912 Stockholm	Individual eventing
Silver medal – second place	1912 Stockholm	Team eventing

Friedrich Leopold Harry von Rochow (12 August 1881 – 17 August 1945) was a German horse rider who competed in the 1912 Summer Olympics. He was part of the German team, which won the silver medal in the equestrian team event, also he won the silver medal in the individual event.
