= Richard Graf von Schaesberg-Tannheim =

German equestrian

Olympic medal record

Men's Equestrian
Silver medal – second place	1912 Stockholm	Team eventing

Richard Ferdinand Maximilian Ignatius Joseph Valentin Hubertus Maria Graf von Schaesberg-Tannheim (January 7, 1884 in Tannheim – September 20, 1953 in Surenburg, Hörstel) was a German Graf and horse rider who competed in the 1912 Summer Olympics. He was part of the German team, which was able to win the silver medal in the equestrian team event.
