= Guy Henry (equestrian) =

United States Army general and equestrian

Guy Vernor Henry Jr.
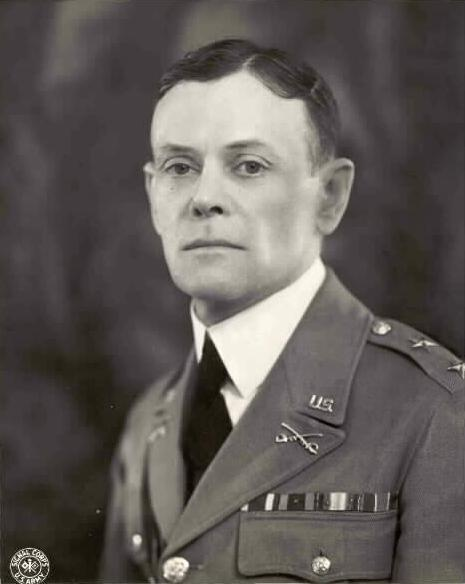
- Born: January 28, 1875; Fort Robinson, Nebraska, United States
- Died: November 29, 1967 (aged 92); Wenatchee, Washington, United States
- Burial place: Arlington National Cemetery, Virginia, United States
- Relatives: Guy V. Henry (father)
- Military career
- Allegiance: United States
- Branch: US Army
- Service years: 1898–1939; 1941–1947
- Rank: Major General
- Unit: Cavalry Branch
- Commands: United States Army Cavalry School; Fort Riley; Fort Myer; 7th Cavalry Brigade; 3rd Cavalry Regiment
- Conflicts: Spanish–American War; Philippine–American War; World War I World War II
- Awards: Army Distinguished Service Medal (2); Silver Star; Legion of Honour (France); Companion of the Order of the Bath (United Kingdom)
- Other work: Olympic equestrian

Medal record

Equestrian

Representing the United States

Olympic Games
Bronze medal – third place	1912 Stockholm	Team eventing

Major General Guy Vernor Henry Jr. (January 28, 1875 – November 29, 1967) was a senior officer in the United States Army and a noted horse rider who competed for the United States in the 1912 Summer Olympics.

== Early life ==
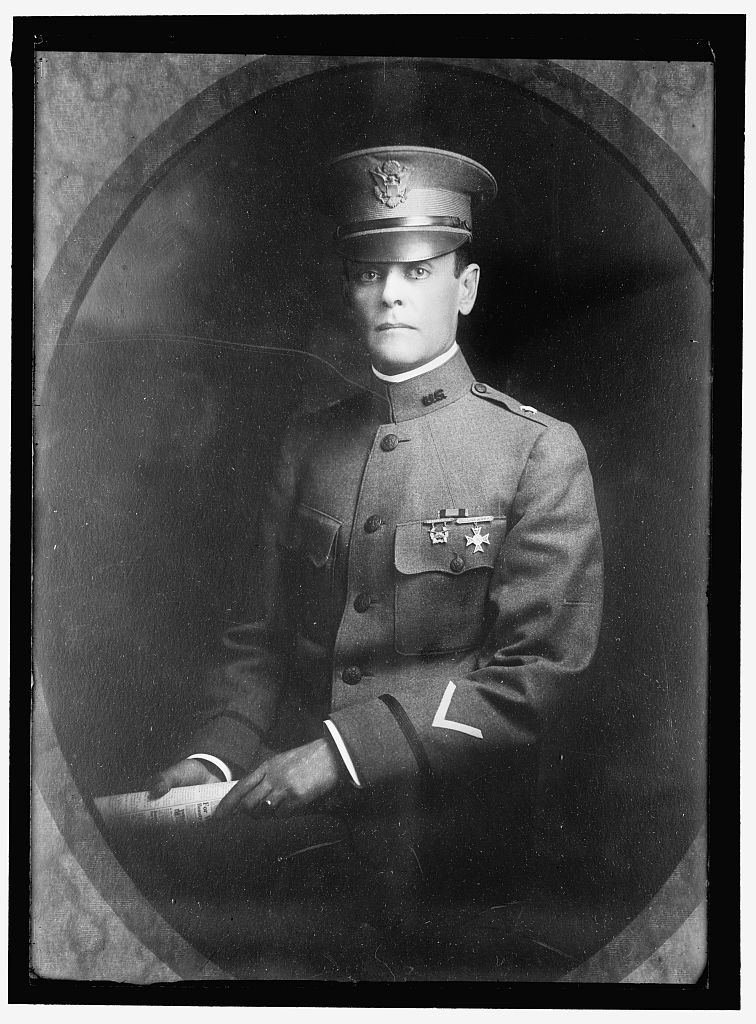
Guy Henry Jr. in a prewar photo

Guy V. Henry Jr. was born into the military life. Son of Guy Vernor Henry, he went on to graduate from the United States Military Academy at West Point, New York in 1898, and distinguished his military career by earning the Silver Star in 1899 during the Spanish–American War.

Henry went on to study at the Saumur Cavalry School in France and used the knowledge he gained there to change the treatment and training of United States Cavalry horses. This included starting horses not by "breaking" them using the traditional western methods, but by training them on the longe, then slowly teaching them to accept the weight of a human on their back. He also brought dressage methods from both the French and German schools, with a great deal of influence from Baucher, and as senior instructor of equitation at the Mounted Service School at Fort Riley he insisted in teaching new recruits to properly use the aids and promoted the European methods. Henry helped to institute the high level of horsemanship at Fort Riley, helping to develop farrier and veterinary programs which were to become required courses for cavalry lieutenants. He also got rid of the harsh curb bit used by the Cavalry, known as the Shoemaker bit, and replaced it with either the snaffle bit or the double bridle.

== Olympic equestrian career ==
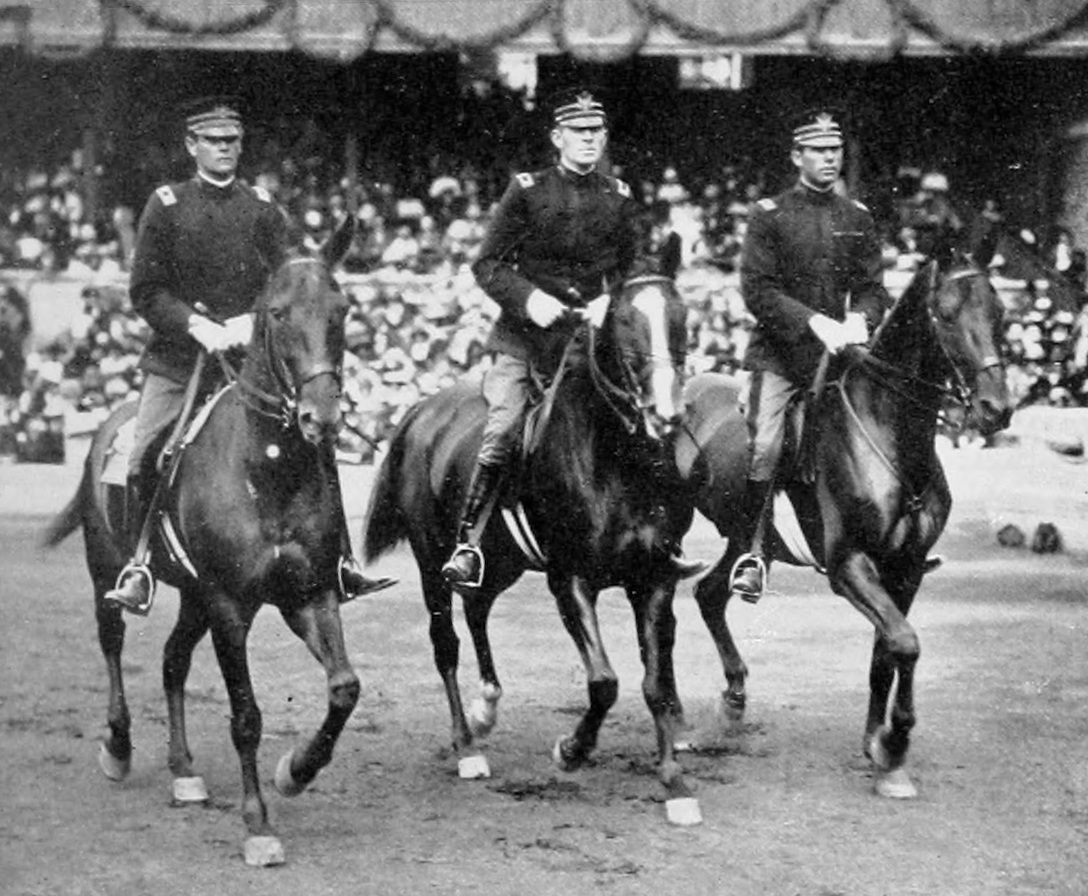
From left to right: Captain Guy Henry, Lieutenant John C. Montgomery, Lieutenant Ben Lear at the 1912 Summer Olympics.

Henry competed in all three Olympic equestrian disciplines – dressage, eventing, and show jumping – for the United States during his years in the army. His most distinguished Olympic results occurred at the 1912 Olympic Games in Stockholm, where he won the bronze medal in the team eventing competition, finished 11th in the individual event, 4th in the team jumping competition, and 13th in the individual dressage competition, riding Chiswell.

Henry later served at Chef dÉquipe for the United States Teams from 1936 to 1948, was chairman on the Olympic Equestrian Committee from 1930 to 1960, and director of equestrian events at the 1932 Summer Olympics in Los Angeles.

== Other achievements ==
- Commandant of Cadets at West Point (1916–1918)
- Commanding General 15th Division (1918−1919)
- Graduate, Army War College, 1921
- Honors Graduate, School of the Line, 1922
- Graduate, General Staff School, 1923
- Commander of Fort Myer, Virginia (1927–1930)
- Succeeded Herbert B. Crosby as Chief of Cavalry, United States Army (1930–1934)
- Commandant of the US Army Cavalry School and Commander of Fort Riley (1935–1938)
- Commander of the Seventh Corps Area (1938–1939)
- Chairman of the US section of the Permanent Joint Defense Board with Canada (1948–1954)
- Judge at horse shows at the international level
- Director of the US Equestrian Team
- Director of the American Horse Shows Association
- Director of New York's National Horse Show Association
- President of the Fédération Équestre Internationale, the only American to be placed in that position (1931–1935)

== Decorations ==
Army Distinguished Service Medal (w/oak leaf cluster)
Silver Star
Spanish War Service Medal
Philippine Campaign Medal
Army of Puerto Rican Occupation Medal
World War I Victory Medal
World War II Victory Medal
American Defense Service Medal
American Campaign Medal
European-African-Middle Eastern Campaign Medal with two campaign stars
Chevalier of the Legion of Honour
Order of the Bath
