= Jacques Cariou =

French equestrian and military officer (1870–1951)

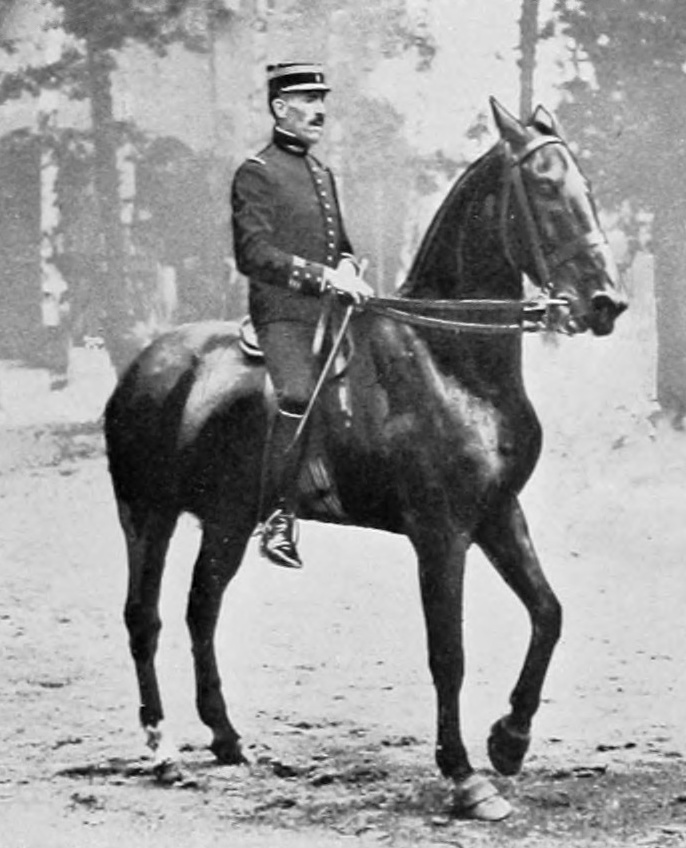
- Jacques Cariou at the 1912 Olympics

Personal information
- Born: 23 September 1870 Peumérit, France
- Died: 7 October 1931 (aged 61) Boulogne-Billancourt, Hauts-de-Seine, France
- Monument: Peumerit Terre de jeux à Jacques Cariou
- Occupation: Soldier
- Employer: French Army
- Height: 1.73 m (5 ft 8 in)
- Spouse: Marie Bezançon

Sport
- Country: France
- Sport: Equestrian: dressage, show jumping, eventing
Medal record
Representing France
Olympic Games
Gold medal – first place	1912 Stockholm	Individual jumping
Silver medal – second place	1912 Stockholm	Team jumping
Bronze medal – third place	1912 Stockholm	Individual eventing

Jacques Cariou (23 September 1870 – 7 October 1931) was a French show jumping champion and military officer. Cariou participated at the 1912 Summer Olympics held in Stockholm, where he won a gold medal in the individual jumping, a silver medal in team jumping with the horse Mignon, and a bronze medal in individual three-day eventing with the horse Cocotte.

== Biography ==
Cariou was born in 1870 in Peumerit, Brittany. Cariou spent his early years as a teacher and horsemanship instructor, but later would go on to join the Army. He would eventually rise to the rank of Lieutenant Colonel. Early in his military years, he was awarded France's Order of Agricultural Merit as well as a foreign award from Belgium, but it is not known how he came to be awarded these honors.

=== 1912 Olympics ===
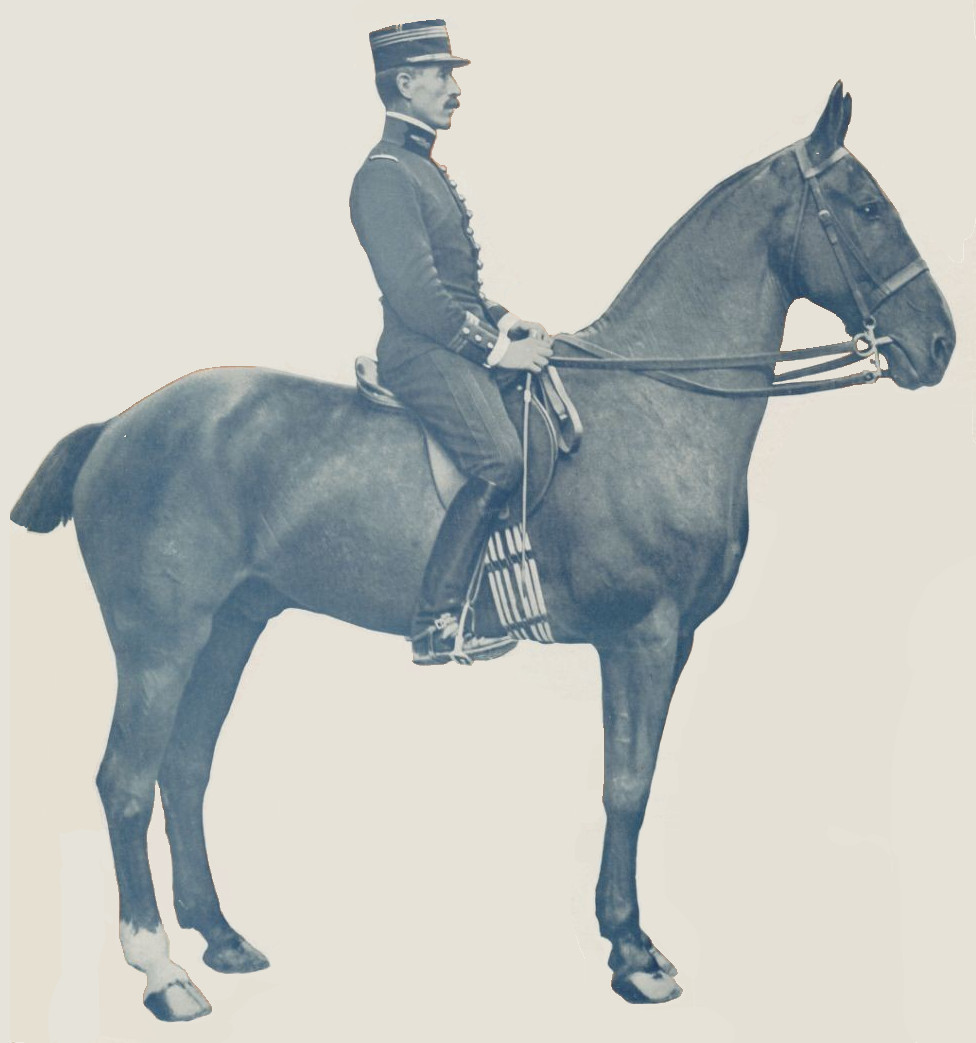
Cariou and Mignon pictured at the Olympic Games

Cariou was selected by the Army to represent France at the 1912 Olympic Games. During the games, Cariou participated in all three equestrian disciplines. He placed 14th individually in the dressage competition on Mignon. He would win an individual gold medal in the jumping competition and help the French team win the silver medal in the team competition. Riding Cocotte, he won an individual bronze medal in the eventing competition.

=== World War 1 ===
After the Olympics, he returned to the Army. France shortly would become embroiled in World War I. In 1915, he led a battalion in the Battle of Champagne where he was gassed. His actions as the leader of his unit would later earn him a knighthood of the Legion of Honour.

=== Later life ===
He remained with the Army and would later be honored as an officer of the Legion of Honour for his later work as a military officer.

Cariou died on 7 October 1931.

== Legacy ==
Prior to the 2024 Summer Olympic Games in Paris, Cariou's hometown of Peumerit honored their former Olympic champion with a commemorative plaque in the town center, and named the local sports arena after him.

== Honors ==
- Order of Agricultural Merit, 21 January 1910
- Order of the Crown (Belgium), 1910
- Swedish Commemoration Medal, 1912
- Croix de Guerre, 1918
- Knight of the Legion of Honour, 23 May 1922.
- Officer of the Legion of Honour, March 7, 1924.
