= Ernest Meyer =

French equestrian

Medal record

Representing France

Men's equestrian

Olympic Games
Silver medal – second place	1912 Stockholm	Jumping, team

Ernest Victor Meyer (15 February 1865 – 28 June 1919) was a French show jumping champion. Meyer participated at the 1912 Summer Olympics held in Stockholm, where he earned a silver medal in team jumping with the French team.
