= Cycling at the 1912 Summer Olympics – Men's individual time trial =

Cycling at the Olympics

Men's time trial at the Games of the V Olympiad
- Venue: Roads near Mälaren
- Dates: July 7, 1912
- Competitors: 123 from 16 nations

Medalists
1st place, gold medalist(s)		Rudolph Lewis	South Africa
2nd place, silver medalist(s)		Frederick Grubb	Great Britain
3rd place, bronze medalist(s)		Carl Schutte	United States

The men's individual time trial was a road bicycle racing event held as part of the cycling at the 1912 Summer Olympics programme. It was the first appearance of the event. The competition was held on Sunday July 7, 1912. The course was 320 kilometers (198.8 miles) long and the cyclists started at two minute interval, starting at 2:00 a.m.

The track had been used for the annual one day race Mälaren runt since 1901. The race started at Liljeholmsbron, Stockholm. Intermediate times were measured at six control stations around the track: Eskilstuna (120 km), Köping (165 km), Västerås (200 km), Enköping (231 km), Bålsta (265 km) and Järva (315 km). The finish line was in the Olympic Stadium.

123 cyclists from 16 nations competed.

Results of this race were used to determine the medals for the team time trial as well.

== Results ==
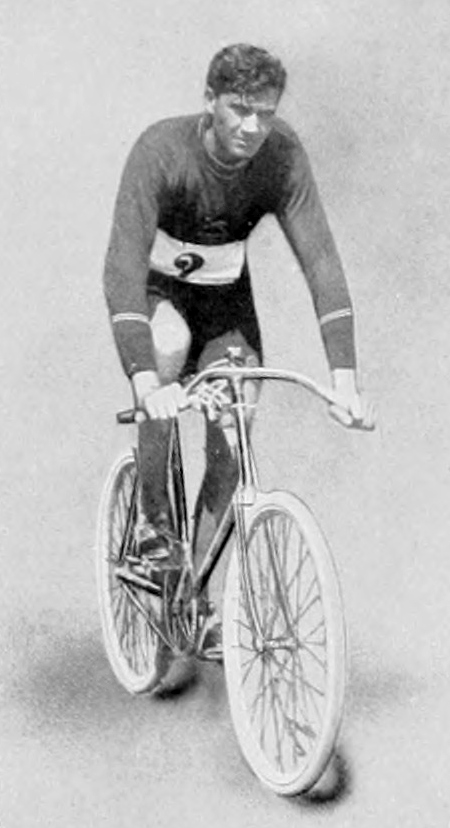
Gold medalist Rudolph Lewis

Place	Cyclist	Time	Retired at
1	Rudolph Lewis (RSA)	10:42:39.0	
2	Frederick Grubb (GBR)	10:51:24.2	
3	Carl Schutte (USA)	10:52:38.8	
4	Leonard Meredith (GBR)	11:00:02.6	
5	Frank Brown (CAN)	11:01:00.0	
6	Antti Raita (FIN)	11:02:20.3	
7	Erik Friborg (SWE)	11:04:17.0	
8	Ragnar Malm (SWE)	11:08:14.5	
9	Axel Persson (SWE)	11:10:59.6	
10	Algot Lönn (SWE)	11:12:02.5	
11	Alvin Loftes (USA)	11:13:51.3	
12	Alex Ekström (SWE)	11:14:50.7	
13	Albert Krushel (USA)	11:17:30.2	
14	Birger Andreassen (NOR)	11:20:14.6	
15	Henrik Morén (SWE)	11:21:31.9	
16	John Wilson (GBR)	11:21:43.0	
17	Walden Martin (USA)	11:23:55.2	
18	Charles Moss (GBR)	11:23:55.8	
19	Werner Karlsson (SWE)	11:24:18.0	
20	Joseph Kopsky (USA)	11:27:06.0	
21	Vilho Tilkanen (FIN)	11:28:38.5	
22	William Hammond (GBR)	11:29:16.8	
23	Robert Rammer (AUT)	11:30:40.8	
24	Robert Thompson (GBR)	11:31:16.0	
25	Olaf Meyland-Smith (DEN)	11:32:24.2	
26	Franz Lemnitz (GER)	11:34:32.2	
27	Rudolf Baier (GER)	11:35:01.5	
28	John Becht (USA)	11:35:04.8	
29	Stanley Jones (GBR)	11:37:40.6	
30	Herbert Gayler (GBR)	11:39:01.8	
31	Adolf Kofler (AUT)	11:39:32.6	
32	Charles Hansen (DEN)	11:40:04.0	
33	Oswald Rathmann (GER)	11:40:18.4	
34	Johan Kankkonen (FIN)	11:41:35.5	
35	John Miller (GBR)	11:44:01.6	
36	Georg Warsow (GER)	11:45:24.0	
37	Francis Higgins (GBR)	11:45:44.5	
38	Arthur Gibbon (GBR)	11:46:00.2	
39	Charles Davey (GBR)	11:47:26.3	
40	Joseph Racine (FRA)	11:50:32.7	
41	David Stevenson (GBR)	11:52:55.0	
42	Alberto Downey (CHI)	11:53:02.5	
43	Rudolf Kramer (AUT)	11:53:12.8	
44	Otto Männel (GER)	11:53:27.4	
45	Josef Hellensteiner (AUT)	11:54:00.2	
46	Josef Zilker (AUT)	11:54:38.7	
47	Paul Henrichsen (NOR)	11:55:23.2	
48	Johannes Reinwaldt (DEN)	11:57:20.0	
49	Charles Hill (GBR)	11:57:56.5	
50	André Capelle (FRA)	11:59:48.4	
51	Gunnar Björk (SWE)	12:00:49.4	
52	Alois Wacha (AUT)	12:01:12.4	
53	Godtfred Olsen (DEN)	12:06:18.8	
54	Jesse Pike (USA)	12:06:21.6	
55	Wilhelm Rabe (GER)	12:06:55.8	
56	Jerome Steinert (USA)	12:08:32.3	
57	Josef Rieder (GER)	12:12:32.4	
58	Cárlos Koller (CHI)	12:13:49.2	
59	Ernest Merlin (GBR)	12:16:08.6	
60	Andrejs Apsītis (RU1)	12:18:20.6	
61	Martin Koch (GER)	12:18:22.5	
62	Robert Birker (GER)	12:19:27.6	
63	Bohumil Rameš (BOH)	12:20:12.2	
64	René Gagnet (FRA)	12:20:32.6	
65	Anton Hansen (NOR)	12:21:23.7	
66	Hjalmar Väre (FIN)	12:21:29.2	
67	Michael Walker (GBR)	12:27:49.9	
68	James Stevenson (GBR)	12:27:50.8	
69	Arturo Friedemann (CHI)	12:28:20.8	
70	Frank Meissner (USA)	12:29:09.0	
71	Francis Guy (GBR)	12:32:19.4	
72	Valdemar Nielsen (DEN)	12:33:09.2	
73	István Müller (HUN)	12:39:28.0	
74	José Torres (CHI)	12:39:39.5	
75	János Henzsel (HUN)	12:42:16.3	
76	Hermann Smiel (GER)	12:49:01.6	
77	Gyula Mazur (HUN)	12:50:55.8	
78	George Watson (CAN)	12:52:22.2	
79	Carl Lüthje (GER)	13:00:31.8	
80	Ralph Mecredy (GBR)	13:03:39.0	
81	John Walker (GBR)	13:15:50.2	
82	Matthew Walsh (GBR)	13:31:17.0	
83	Georges Valentin (FRA)	13:33:59.5	
84	Ignác Teiszenberger (HUN)	13:38:35.8	
85	Bernard Doyle (GBR)	13:42:11.8	
86	George Corsar (GBR)	13:51:22.8	
87	Václav Tintěra (BOH)	14:10:34.6	
88	Bohumil Kubrycht (BOH)	14:11:21.0	
89	Étienne Chéret (FRA)	14:15:18.1	
90	Arthur Griffiths (GBR)	14:15:24.0	
91	Gaston Alancourt (FRA)	14:23:59.3	
92	Pierre Peinaud (FRA)	14:49:59.4	
93	André Lepère (FRA)	15:03:18.1	
94	Alexis Michiels (FRA)	15:15:59.2	
—	Fyodor Borisov (RU1)	Did not finish	between Bålsta – Järva
—	Károly Teppert (HUN)	Did not finish	between Bålsta – Järva
—	Hans Olsen (DEN)	Did not finish	between Enköping – Bålsta
—	Carl Olsen (NOR)	Did not finish	in Enköping
—	Augusts Kepke (RU1)	Did not finish	in Kungsör
—	Jānis Prātnieks (RU1)	Did not finish	between Eskilstuna – Kungsör
—	Valdemar Christoffer Nielsen (DEN)	Did not finish	between Eskilstuna – Kungsör
—	Jan Vokoun (BOH)	Did not finish	between Eskilstuna – Kungsör
—	Edgars Rihters (RU1)	Did not finish	in Eskilstuna
—	Carl Lundquist (SWE)	Did not finish	between Strängnäs – Eskilstuna
—	Arvid Pettersson (SWE)	Did not finish	between Strängnäs – Eskilstuna
—	Fridrihs Bošs (RU1)	Did not finish	between Strängnäs – Eskilstuna
—	John Kirk (GBR)	Did not finish	in Strängnäs
—	Karl Gulbrandsen (NOR)	Did not finish	in Strängnäs
—	Jēkabs Bukse (RU1)	Did not finish	between Strängnäs – Läggesta
—	Martin Sæterhaug (NOR)	Did not finish	in Läggestatrakterna
—	Hjalmar Levin (SWE)	Did not finish	between Södertälje – Läggesta
—	Otto Jensen (DEN)	Did not finish	between Södertälje – Läggesta
—	Jules Patou (BEL)	Did not finish	between Södertälje – Läggesta
—	Sergey Pesteryev (RU1)	Did not finish	between Södertälje – Läggesta
—	Jacques Marcault (FRA)	Did not finish	outside Södertälje
—	Jānis Līvens (RU1)	Did not finish	outside Södertälje
—	Louis Bès (FRA)	Did not finish	outside Södertälje
—	René Rillon (FRA)	Did not finish	2 km beyond Södertälje
—	Arthur Stokes (GBR)	Did not finish	in Södertälje
—	Kārlis Kepke (RU1)	Did not finish	before Södertälje
—	František Kundert (BOH)	Did not finish	in Södertälje
—	Juho Jaakonaho (FIN)	Did not finish	before Södertälje
—	Karl Landsberg (SWE)	Did not finish	by Midsommarkransen
