= Great Britain at the 1912 Summer Olympics =

- Flag of Great Britain
- IOC code: GBR
- NOC: British Olympic Association

in Stockholm
- Competitors: 274 (264 men and 10 women) in 16 sports
- Flag bearer: Charles Smith
- Medals Ranked 3rd: Gold 10 Silver 15 Bronze 16 Total 41

Summer Olympics appearances (overview)
- 1896; 1900; 1904; 1908; 1912; 1920; 1924; 1928; 1932; 1936; 1948; 1952; 1956; 1960; 1964; 1968; 1972; 1976; 1980; 1984; 1988; 1992; 1996; 2000; 2004; 2008; 2012; 2016; 2020; 2024

Other related appearances
- 1906 Intercalated Games

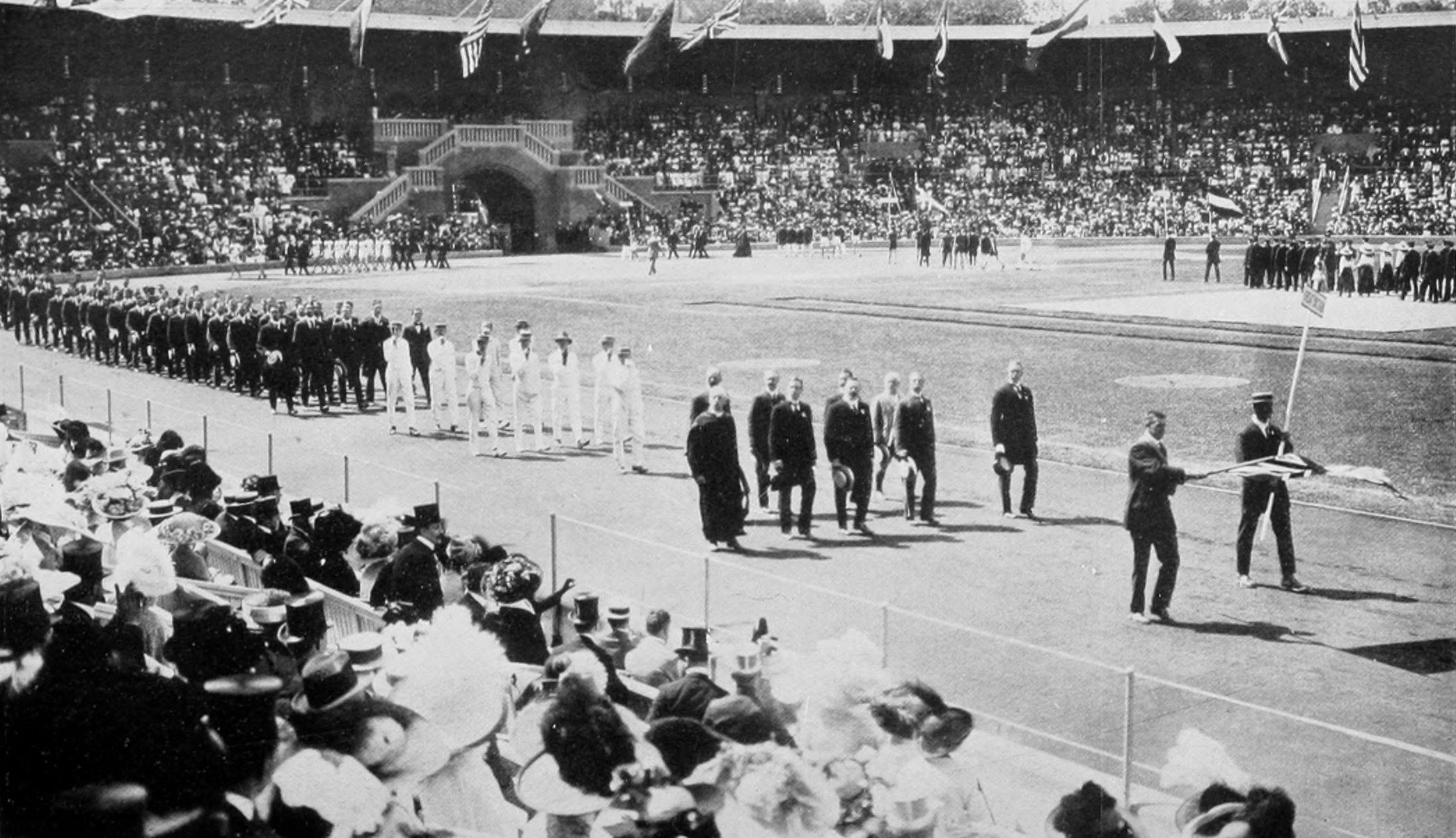
The team of Great Britain at the opening ceremony.

Great Britain, represented by the British Olympic Association (BOA), the previous host of the 1908 Summer Olympics in London, competed at the 1912 Summer Olympics in Stockholm, Sweden. 274 competitors, 264 men and 10 women, took part in 79 events in 16 sports. British and Irish athletes won ten gold medals and 41 medals overall, finishing third.

== Medallists ==
Medal	Name	Sport	Event	Date
Gold	Arnold Jackson	Athletics	Men's 1500 m	July 10
Gold	Willie Applegarth, Victor d'Arcy, David Jacobs, Henry Macintosh	Athletics	Men's 4 × 100 m relay	July 9
Gold	Great Britain men's Olympic football team: Arthur Berry; Ronald Brebner; Thomas Burn; Joseph Dines; Ted Hanney; Gordon Hoare; Arthur Knight; Henry Littlewort; Douglas McWhirter; Ivan Sharpe; Harold Stamper; Harold Walden; Vivian Woodward; Gordon Wright	Football		July 4
Gold	Wally Kinnear	Rowing	Men's single sculls	July 19
Gold	Edgar Burgess, Philip Fleming, Stanley Garton, James Angus Gillan, Ewart Horsfall, Alister Kirby, Sidney Swann, Henry Wells, Leslie Wormald	Rowing	Men's eight	July 19
Gold	Edward Lessimore, Robert Murray; Joseph Pepé, William Pimm	Shooting	Men's 50 m team small-bore rifle	July 3
Gold	Jennie Fletcher, Belle Moore, Annie Speirs, Irene Steer	Swimming	Women's 4 × 100 m freestyle relay	July 15
Gold	Edith Hannam	Tennis	Women's indoor singles	May 11
Gold	Charles P. Dixon, Edith Hannam	Tennis	Mixed indoor doubles	May 12
Gold	Great Britain men's national water polo team: Isaac Bentham; Charles Bugbee; George Cornet; Arthur Edwin Hill; Paul Radmilovic; Charles Sydney Smith; George Wilkinson	Water polo		July 16
Silver	Ernest Webb	Athletics	Men's 10 km walk	July 11
Silver	Freddie Grubb	Cycling	Men's individual time trial	July 17
Silver	Freddie Grubb, William Hammond, Leonard Meredith, Charles Moss	Cycling	Men's team time trial	July 7
Silver	Edgar Amphlett, John Blake, Percival Davson, Arthur Everitt, Martin Holt, Sydney Martineau, Robert Montgomerie, Edgar Seligman	Fencing	Men's team épée	July 10
Silver	Julius Beresford, Geoffrey Carr, Bruce Logan; Charles Rought, Karl Vernon	Rowing	Men's coxed four	July 19
Silver	Robert Bourne, Beaufort Burdekin, William Fison, Thomas Gillespie, Charles Littlejohn, William Parker, Frederick Pitman, John Walker, Arthur Wiggins	Rowing	Men's eight	July 19
Silver	William Milne	Shooting	Men's 50 m rifle, prone	July 4
Silver	Henry Burr, Arthur Fulton, Harcourt Ommundsen, Edward Parnell, James Reid, Edward Skilton	Shooting	Men's team rifle	June 29
Silver	William Milne, Joseph Pepé; William Pimm, William Styles	Shooting	Men's 25 m team small-bore rifle	July 5
Silver	John Butt, William Grosvenor, Charles Palmer; Harold Humby, Alexander Maunder, George Whitaker	Shooting	Men's trap, team	July 1
Silver	Jack Hatfield	Swimming	Men's 400 m freestyle	July 14
Silver	Jack Hatfield	Swimming	Men's 1500 m freestyle	July 10
Silver	Charles P. Dixon	Tennis	Men's indoor singles	May 12
Silver	Helen Aitchison, Herbert Barrett	Tennis	Mixed indoor doubles	May 12
Silver	City of London Police: Walter Chaffe; Joseph Dowler; Frederick Humphreys; Mathias Hynes; Edwin Mills; Alexander Munro; John Sewell; John Shepherd	Tug of war		July 8
Bronze	Willie Applegarth	Athletics	Men's 200 m	July 11
Bronze	George Hutson	Athletics	Men's 5000 m	July 10
Bronze	Ernest Henley, George Nicol, Cyril Seedhouse, James Soutter	Athletics	Men's 4 × 400 m relay	July 15
Bronze	Joe Cottrill, George Hutson, William Moore, Edward Owen, Cyril Porter	Athletics	Men's 3000 m team race	July 13
Bronze	Ernest Glover, Frederick Hibbins, Thomas Humphreys	Athletics	Men's team cross country	July 15
Bronze	Isabelle White	Diving	Women's 10 m platform	July 13
Bronze	Albert Betts; William Cowhig; Sidney Cross; Harry Dickason; Herbert Drury; Bernard Franklin; Leonard Hanson; Samuel Hodgetts; Charles Luck; William MacKune; Ronald McLean; Alfred Messenger; Henry Oberholzer; Edward Pepper; Edward Potts; Reginald Potts; George Ross; Charles Simmons; Arthur Southern; William Titt; Charles Vigurs; Samuel Walker; John Whitaker	Gymnastics	Men's team	July 11
Bronze	Charles Stewart	Shooting	Men's 50 m pistol	April 1
Bronze	Hugh Durant, Albert Kempster, Horatio Poulter, Charles Stewart	Shooting	Men's 30 m team military pistol	July 3
Bronze	Hugh Durant, Albert Kempster, Horatio Poulter, Charles Stewart	Shooting	Men's 50 m team free pistol	July 2
Bronze	Harold Burt	Shooting	Men's 50 m rifle, prone	July 4
Bronze	Percy Courtman	Swimming	Men's 400 m breaststroke	July 12
Bronze	Thomas Battersby, William Foster, Jack Hatfield, Henry Taylor	Swimming	Men's 4 × 200 m freestyle relay	July 15
Bronze	Jennie Fletcher	Swimming	Women's 100 m freestyle	July 12
Bronze	Alfred Beamish, Charles P. Dixon	Tennis	Men's indoor doubles	May 11
Bronze	Mabel Parton	Tennis	Women's indoor singles	May 11

== Aquatics ==
=== Diving ===
Three divers, including one woman, represented Great Britain. The inclusion of Isabelle White on the British team made Great Britain one of three nations (along with Austria and host Sweden to send a woman to the first Olympic diving competition open to women.

It was Great Britain's second appearance in diving. White was the only diver to win a medal for the nation, giving Great Britain its first diving medal. Each of the men advanced to the final in one event, but were unable to finish in the top three.

Rankings given are within the diver's heat.

Diver	Events	Heats		Final	
Diver	Events	Result	Rank	Result	Rank
Herbert Pott	3 m board	73.94	4 q	71.45	6
Isabelle White	10 m platform	33.9	3 q	34	3rd place, bronze medalist(s)
George Yvon	10 m platform	65.7	2 Q	67.66	5
George Yvon	Plain high dive	35.2	3	Did not advance	

=== Swimming ===
18 swimmers, including six women, competed for Great Britain at the 1912 Games. It was the third time the nation had competed in swimming.

The British women won the gold medal in the relay event, with Fletcher adding a bronze in the women's individual race. The men took a total of four medals, two silver and two bronze, with both silvers coming from Hatfield.

Ranks given for each swimmer are within the heat.

Men

Swimmer	Events	Heat		Quarterfinal		Semifinal		Final	
Swimmer	Events	Result	Rank	Result	Rank	Result	Rank	Result	Rank
Carlyle Atkinson	200 m breaststroke	N/A		3:12.0	1 Q	3:15.2	5	Did not advance	
Thomas Battersby	400 m freestyle	N/A		6:03.6	1 Q	5:51.2	5	Did not advance	
Thomas Battersby	1500 m freestyle	N/A		23:58.0	2 Q	Unknown	4	Did not advance	
Percy Courtman	200 m breaststroke	N/A		3:09.8	2 Q	3:09.4	3 q	3:08.8	4
Percy Courtman	400 m breaststroke	N/A		6:43.8 OR	1 Q	6:36.6	3 q	6:36.4	3rd place, bronze medalist(s)
John Derbyshire	100 m freestyle	1:09.2	3	Did not advance					
William Foster	400 m freestyle	N/A		5:52.4	4 Q	5:49.0	3	Did not advance	
William Foster	1500 m freestyle	N/A		23:52.2	2 Q	23:32.2	3	Did not advance	
Herbert Haresnape	100 m backstroke	N/A		1:27.0	1 Q	1:26.8	3	Did not advance	
John Hatfield	400 m freestyle	N/A		5:35.6	2 Q	5:25.6	2 Q	5:25.8	2nd place, silver medalist(s)
John Hatfield	1500 m freestyle	N/A		23:16.6	2 Q	22:33.4	2 Q	22:39.0	2nd place, silver medalist(s)
George Innocent	200 m breaststroke	N/A		Disqualified		Did not advance			
George Innocent	400 m breaststroke	N/A		7:07.8	2 Q	Did not finish		Did not advance	
Paul Radmilovic	100 m freestyle	1:10.4	2 Q	1:19.0	5	Did not advance			
Frank Sandon	100 m backstroke	N/A		1:31.8	2 Q	1:32.2	4	Did not advance	
Henry Taylor	400 m freestyle	N/A		5:48.4	2 Q	5:48.2	5	Did not advance	
Henry Taylor	1500 m freestyle	N/A		24:06.4	3 q	Did not finish		Did not advance	
George Webster	100 m backstroke	N/A		1:29.4	2 Q	Unknown	6	Did not advance	
Thomas Battersby; William Foster; Jack Hatfield; Henry Taylor	4 × 200 m free relay	N/A				10:39.4	3 q	10:28.6	3rd place, bronze medalist(s)

Women

Swimmer	Events	Heat		Quarterfinal		Semifinal		Final	
Swimmer	Events	Result	Rank	Result	Rank	Result	Rank	Result	Rank
Daisy Curwen	100 m freestyle	N/A		1:23.6 OR	1 Q	1:26.8	2 Q	Did not start	
Jennie Fletcher	100 m freestyle	N/A		1:26.2	2 Q	1:27.2	2 Q	1:27.0	3rd place, bronze medalist(s)
Mary Langford	100 m freestyle	N/A		1:28.0	2 Q	1:29.2	5	Did not advance	
Belle Moore	100 m freestyle	N/A		1:29.8 OR	1 Q	1:27.4	4	Did not advance	
Annie Speirs	100 m freestyle	N/A		1:25.6	2 Q	1:27.0	3 q	1:27.4	5
Irene Steer	100 m freestyle	N/A		1:27.2	1 Q	Disqualified		Did not advance	
Jennie Fletcher; Belle Moore; Annie Speirs; Irene Steer	4 × 100 m free relay	N/A						5:52.8 WR	1st place, gold medalist(s)

=== Water polo ===
Great Britain made its third appearance in Olympic water polo in 1912. The British squad had won the gold medal in both of its prior appearances, in 1908 and 1900. They remained true to form, winning all three matches in 1912 to take their third gold medal. The toughest match of the tournament for the British side was the first one, against a Belgium team that Great Britain needed extra time to defeat. The luck of the draw was that the matches got easier from there, with the British team beating Sweden 6–3 in the semifinals and Austria 8–0 in the final.

Team	Event	Quarterfinals	Semifinals	Finals	Repechage semifinal	Repechage final	Silver round 1	Silver round 2	Silver match	Rank
Team	Event	Opposition Score	Opposition Score	Opposition Score	Opposition Score	Opposition Score	Opposition Score	Opposition Score	Opposition Score	Rank
Great Britain	Water polo	Belgium; W 7–5 a.e.t.	Sweden; W 6–3	Austria; W 8–0	N/A					1st place, gold medalist(s)

Quarterfinals

July 7, 1912	Great Britain	7–5	Belgium	Djurgårdsbrunnsviken
July 7, 1912	Hill (2), Wilkinson (2), Radmilovic (2), Bentham	Goals	Grégoire (2), Meyboom (2), Nijs	Djurgårdsbrunnsviken

Semifinals

July 11, 1912	Great Britain	6–3	Sweden	Djurgårdsbrunnsviken
July 11, 1912	Wilkinson (3), Hill, Radmilovic, Bentham	Goals	R. Andersson (2), V. Andersson	Djurgårdsbrunnsviken

Final

July 13, 1912	Great Britain	8–0	Austria	Djurgårdsbrunnsviken
July 13, 1912	?	Goals	?	Djurgårdsbrunnsviken

== Athletics ==
65 athletes represented Great Britain. It was the fifth appearance of the nation in athletics, which Great Britain had competed in at each Games. The team finished with two gold medals, one silver, and five bronzes.

Ranks given are within that athlete's heat for running events.

Athlete	Events	Heat		Semifinal		Final	
Athlete	Events	Result	Rank	Result	Rank	Result	Rank
Sidney Abrahams	Long jump	N/A		6.74	12	Did not advance	
Arthur Anderson	100 m	11.0	1 Q	?	5	Did not advance	
Arthur Anderson	200 m	?	2 Q	Did not finish		Did not advance	
Gerard Anderson	110 m hurdles	18.6	2 Q	Did not finish		Did not advance	
Willie Applegarth	100 m	?	2 Q	?	2	Did not advance	
Willie Applegarth	200 m	24.7	1 Q	21.9	1 Q	22.0	3rd place, bronze medalist(s)
Henry Ashington	Long jump	N/A		6.78	10	Did not advance	
Henry Ashington	Standing long jump	N/A		3.02	14	Did not advance	
Benjamin Howard Baker	High jump	N/A		1.83	1 Q	1.75	11
Benjamin Howard Baker	Standing high jump	N/A		1.35	16	Did not advance	
James Barker	100 m	Did not finish		Did not advance			
Henry Barrett	Marathon	N/A				Did not finish	
James Beale	Marathon	N/A				Did not finish	
Henry Blakeney	100 m	?	4	Did not advance			
Henry Blakeney	110 m hurdles	17.4	2 Q	?	3	Did not advance	
Robert Bridge	10 km walk	N/A		Disqualified		Did not advance	
Robert Burton	800 m	Did not finish		Did not advance			
Denis Carey	Hammer throw	N/A		43.78	6	Did not advance	
Timothy Carroll	Triple jump	N/A		12.56	19	Did not advance	
Timothy Carroll	High jump	N/A		1.83	1 Q	1.80	9
Joe Cottrill	1500 m	N/A		?	3	Did not advance	
Joe Cottrill	Ind. cross country	N/A				Did not finish	
Victor d'Arcy	100 m	11.2	1 Q	?	5	Did not advance	
Victor d'Arcy	200 m	22.9	2 Q	?	2	Did not advance	
Thomas Dumbill	10 km walk	N/A		50:57.6	3 Q	Disqualified	
Robert Duncan	100 m	?	3	Did not advance			
Robert Duncan	200 m	?	2 Q	Did not finish		Did not advance	
Septimus Francom	Marathon	N/A				Did not finish	
Ernest Glover	5000 m	N/A		16:09.1	2 Q	Did not start	
Ernest Glover	10000 m	N/A		35:12.2	5 Q	Did not start	
Ernest Glover	Ind. cross country	N/A				49:53.7	16
Harry Green	Marathon	N/A				2:52:11.4	14
Ernest Haley	200 m	?	4	Did not advance			
Ernest Haley	400 m	1:06.6	1 Q	Did not finish		Did not advance	
Albert Hare	1500 m	N/A		4:39.4	3	Did not advance	
Walter Henderson	Discus throw	N/A		33.61	32	Did not advance	
Ernest Henley	400 m	?	2 Q	?	6	Did not advance	
Ernest Henley	800 m	1:57.6	1 Q	?	6-9	Did not advance	
Frederick Hibbins	5000 m			15:27.6	3 Q	?	8-11
Frederick Hibbins	10000 m	N/A		Did not finish		Did not advance	
Frederick Hibbins	Ind. cross country	N/A				49:18.2	15
Frederick Hulford	800 m	?	2 Q	Did not finish		Did not advance	
Frederick Hulford	1500 m	N/A		?	5-6	Did not advance	
Thomas Humphreys	10000 m	N/A		Did not finish		Did not advance	
Thomas Humphreys	Ind. cross country	N/A				50:28.0	18
George Hutson	5000 m	N/A		15:29.0	3 Q	15:07.6	3rd place, bronze medalist(s)
Arnold Jackson	1500 m	N/A		4:10.8	1 Q	3:56.8 OR	1st place, gold medalist(s)
David Jacobs	100 m	10.8 =OR	1 Q	?	2	Did not advance	
David Jacobs	200 m	23.2	1 Q	?	2	Did not advance	
Tim Kellaway	Marathon	N/A				Did not finish	
Philip Kingsford	Long jump	N/A		6.65	15	Did not advance	
Philip Kingsford	Standing long jump	N/A		2.75	19	Did not advance	
George Lee	5000 m	N/A		?	4	Did not advance	
George Lee	10000 m	N/A		Did not finish		Did not advance	
Edgar Lloyd	Marathon	N/A				3:09:25.0	25
Frederick Lord	Marathon	N/A				3:01:39.2	21
Henry Macintosh	100 m	?	3	Did not advance			
Henry Macintosh	200 m	?	2 Q	Did not finish		Did not advance	
Duncan Macmillan	100 m	?	5	Did not advance			
Duncan Macmillan	200 m	?	2 Q	?	5	Did not advance	
Percy Mann	800 m	1:56.0	1 Q	?	6	Did not advance	
William Moore	1500 m	N/A		4:11.2	3	Did not advance	
George Nicol	400 m	50.0	1 Q	?	3	Did not advance	
Philip Noel-Baker	800 m	Did not finish		Did not advance			
Philip Noel-Baker	1500 m	N/A		4:26.0	2 Q	4:01.0	6
Thomas O'Donahue	High jump	N/A		1.70	23	Did not advance	
Edward Owen	1500 m	N/A		Did not finish		Did not advance	
William Palmer	10 km walk	N/A		51:21.0	5 Q	Did not finish	
Alan Patterson	400 m	?	5	Did not advance			
Alan Patterson	800 m	Did not finish		Did not advance			
Cyril Porter	5000 m	N/A		16:23.4	3 Q	?	8-11
Kenneth Powell	110 m hurdles	15.6	1 Q	15.6	1 Q	15.5	5
Patrick Quinn	Shot put	N/A		12.53	8	Did not advance	
Richard Rice	100 m	11.4	1 Q	?	3	Did not advance	
Richard Rice	200 m	23.0	2 Q	Did not finish		Did not advance	
Charles Ruffell	1500 m	N/A		Did not finish		Did not advance	
Charles Ruffell	5000 m	N/A		Did not finish		Did not advance	
Charles Ruffell	10000 m	N/A		Did not finish		Did not advance	
William Scott	10000 m	N/A		32:55.2	2 Q	Did not finish	
William Scott	Ind. cross country	N/A				Did not finish	
Cyril Seedhouse	200 m	?	2 Q	?	3	Did not advance	
Cyril Seedhouse	400 m	51.5	1 Q	Did not finish		Did not advance	
James Soutter	400 m	?	2 Q	?	3	Did not advance	
James Soutter	800 m	2:00.4	1 Q	Did not finish		Did not advance	
Arnold Treble	5000 m	N/A		Did not finish		Did not advance	
Arthur Townsend	Marathon	N/A				3:00:05.0	19
George Wallach	10000 m	N/A		Did not finish		Did not advance	
Ernest Webb	10 km walk	N/A		47:25.4	2 Q	46:50.4	2nd place, silver medalist(s)
Joseph Wells	200 m	?	3	Did not advance			
Joseph Wells	400 m	1:01.2	2 Q	Did not finish		Did not advance	
William Yates	10 km walk	N/A		49:43.6	1 Q	Disqualified	
Richard Yorke	800 m	?	3	Did not advance			
Richard Yorke	1500 m	N/A		?	4	Did not advance	
Ernest Glover; Frederick Hibbins; Thomas Humphreys	Team cross country	N/A				49	3rd place, bronze medalist(s)
Willie Applegarth; Victor d'Arcy; David Jacobs; Henry Macintosh	4 × 100 m	45.0	1 Q	43.0 OR	1 Q	42.4	1st place, gold medalist(s)
Ernest Henley; George Nicol; Cyril Seedhouse; James Soutter	4 × 400 m	N/A		3:19.0 OR	1 Q	3:23.2	3rd place, bronze medalist(s)
William Cottrill; George Hutson; William Moore; Edward Owen; Cyril Porter	3000 m team	N/A		6	1 Q	23	3rd place, bronze medalist(s)

== Cycling ==
Twenty-six cyclists represented Great Britain; 24 of the 26 finished the race. It was the third appearance of the nation in cycling. Frederick Grubb had the best time in the time trial, the only race held, winning the silver medal. For the team competition, Great Britain was allowed to have each Home Nation compete separately and entered teams representing England, Scotland, and Ireland. Grubb, along with the next three fastest English cyclists, had a combined time that won another silver medal. The Scottish cyclists placed fourth, with the Irish finishing 11th.

=== Road cycling ===
Cyclist	Events	Final	
Cyclist	Events	Result	Rank
George Corsar	Ind. time trial	13:51:22.8	86
Charles Davey	Ind. time trial	11:47:26.3	39
Bernard Doyle	Ind. time trial	13:42:11.8	85
Herbert Gayler	Ind. time trial	11:39:01.8	30
Arthur Gibbon	Ind. time trial	11:46:00.2	38
Arthur Griffiths	Ind. time trial	14:15:24.0	90
Frederick Grubb	Ind. time trial	10:51:24.2	2nd place, silver medalist(s)
Francis Guy	Ind. time trial	12:32:19.4	71
William Hammond	Ind. time trial	11:29:16.8	22
Francis Higgins	Ind. time trial	11:45:44.5	37
Charles Hill	Ind. time trial	11:57:56.5	49
Stanley Jones	Ind. time trial	11:36:40.6	29
John Kirk	Ind. time trial	Did not finish	
Ralph Mecredy	Ind. time trial	13:03:39.0	80
Leon Meredith	Ind. time trial	11:00:02.6	4
Ernest Merlin	Ind. time trial	12:16:08.6	59
John Miller	Ind. time trial	11:44:01.6	35
Charles Moss	Ind. time trial	11:23:55.8	18
David Stevenson	Ind. time trial	11:52:55.0	41
James Stevenson	Ind. time trial	12:27:50.8	69
Arthur Stokes	Ind. time trial	Did not finish	
Robert Thompson	Ind. time trial	11:31:16.0	24
John Walker	Ind. time trial	13:15:50.2	81
Michael Walker	Ind. time trial	12:27:49.9	68
Matthew Walsh	Ind. time trial	13:31:17.0	82
John Wilson	Ind. time trial	11:21:43.0	16
Frederick Grubb; William Hammond; Leon Meredith; Charles Moss	Team time trial	44:44:39.4	2nd place, silver medalist(s)
Francis Guy; Ralph Mecredy; John Walker; Michael Walker	Team time trial	51:19:38.5	11
John Miller; David Stevenson; Robert Thompson; John Wilson	Team time trial	46:29:55.6	4

== Equestrian ==
Eventing

(The maximum score in each of the five events was 10.00 points. Ranks given are for the cumulative score after each event. Team score is the sum of the top three individual scores.)

Rider	Horse	Event	Long distance		Cross country		Steeplechase		Show jumping		Dressage		Total	
Rider	Horse	Event	Score	Rank	Score	Rank	Score	Rank	Score	Rank	Score	Rank	Score	Rank
Paul Kenna	Harmony	Individual	10.00	1	10.00	1	9.40	16	Disqualified		Retired		Did not finish	
Brian Turner Tom Lawrence	Patrick	Individual	10.00	1	9.85	14	Did not finish		Retired				Did not finish	
Edward Radcliffe-Nash	The Flea	Individual	10.00	1	9.69	17	8.60	19	8.20	17	Did not start		Did not finish	
Herbert Scott	Wisper II	Individual	10.00	1	10.00	1	Disqualified		Retired				Did not finish	
Paul Kenna; Edward Radcliffe-Nash; Herbert Scott; Brian Turner Tom Lawrence	Harmony; The Flea; Wisper II; Patrick	Team	30.00		29.69		Did not finish						Did not finish	

Jumping

Rider	Horse	Event	Final	
Rider	Horse	Event	Penalties	Rank
Herbert Scott	Shamrock	Individual	6	4
Paul Kenna	Harmony	Individual	28	27
Edward Radcliffe-Nash	The Flea	Individual	37	29

== Fencing ==
Twenty-two fencers represented Great Britain. It was the third appearance of the nation in fencing. The British épée team, defending silver medalists, again took second place with four of the six 1908 team members returning. One member of that team, Seligman, had the best individual placements with a pair of sixth-place finishes. Two other Britons advanced to the finals, each taking eighth place.

Fencer	Event	Round 1		Quarterfinal		Semifinal		Final	
Fencer	Event	Record	Rank	Record	Rank	Record	Rank	Record	Rank
Gordon Alexander	Foil	1 loss	1 Q	3 losses	4	Did not advance			
Gordon Alexander	Épée	6 losses	7	Did not advance					
Gerald Ames	Épée	2 losses	2 Q	2 losses	2 Q	3 losses	4	Did not advance	
Edgar Amphlett	Foil	2 losses	2 Q	2 losses	3 Q	Did not finish		Did not advance	
Edgar Amphlett	Épée	Bye		2 losses	2 Q	4 losses	5	Did not advance	
John Blake	Épée	4 losses	5	Did not advance					
Edward Brookfield	Sabre	1 win	3 Q	3 losses	5	Did not advance			
Harry Butterworth	Sabre	1 win	3 Q	3 losses	4	Did not advance			
Ernest Stenson-Cooke	Foil	4 losses	4	Did not advance					
Ernest Stenson-Cooke	Épée	3 losses	4	Did not advance					
Archibald Corble	Sabre	0 wins	4	Did not advance					
Percival Dawson	Foil	4 losses	5	Did not advance					
Percival Dawson	Épée	4 losses	6	Did not advance					
Arthur Everitt	Épée	1 loss	2 Q	4 losses	5	Did not advance			
Arthur Fagan	Foil	2 losses	2 Q	4 losses	5	Did not advance			
Douglas Godfree	Sabre	1 win	4	Did not advance					
Martin Holt	Épée	3 losses	2 Q	2 losses	3 Q	2 losses	1 Q	0–7	8
Alfred Keene	Sabre	Bye		2 losses	4	Did not advance			
William Marsh	Sabre	1 win	3 Q	2 losses	3 Q	1 win	5	Did not advance	
Alfred Ridley-Martin	Sabre	2 wins	2 Q	4 losses	5	Did not advance			
Sydney Martineau	Foil	3 losses	4	Did not advance					
Sydney Martineau	Épée	3 losses	4	Did not advance					
Robert Montgomerie	Foil	1 loss	2 Q	2 losses	2 Q	2 losses	2 Q	0–7	8
Robert Montgomerie	Épée	1 loss	1 Q	2 losses	2 Q	3 losses	4	Did not advance	
Edgar Seligman	Foil	1 loss	1 Q	1 loss	2 Q	1 loss	1 Q	3–4	6
Edgar Seligman	Épée	1 loss	1 Q	2 losses	3 Q	0 losses	1 Q	2–5	6
Alfred Syson	Sabre	1 win	3 Q	0 losses	1 Q	0 wins	3	Did not advance	
Charles Vanderbyl	Épée	Bye		4 losses	5	Did not advance			
Charles Vanderbyl	Sabre	3 wins	1 Q	2 losses	2 Q	2 wins	4	Did not advance	
Edward Brookfield; Harry Butterworth; Archibald Corble; Richard Crawshay; Alfred Ridley-Martin; William Marsh	Team sabre	N/A		1–0	1 Q	0–3	4	Did not advance	
Edgar Amphlett; John Blake; Percival Dawson; Arthur Everitt; Martin Holt; Sydney Martineau; Robert Montgomerie; Edgar Seligman	Team épée	N/A		1–0	1 Q	2–1	2 Q	1–2	2nd place, silver medalist(s)

== Football ==
Quarterfinals

1912-06-30

Great Britain	7 – 0	Hungary
Walden 21' 23' 49' 53' 55' 85'; Woodward 45'

Olympiastadion, Stockholm
Attendance: 8,000

Semifinals

1912-07-02

Great Britain	4 – 0	Finland
Walden 7' 77'; Holopainen 2' (o.g.); Woodward 82'

Olympiastadion, Stockholm
Attendance: 4,000

Gold medal match

1912-07-04

Great Britain	4 – 2	Denmark
Hoare 22' 41'; Walden 10'; Berry 43'		Olsen 27' 81'

Olympiastadion, Stockholm
Attendance: 25,000

Final rank
Gold

== Gymnastics ==
Twenty-three gymnasts represented Great Britain. It was the fourth appearance of the nation in gymnastics, in which Great Britain had not competed only in 1904. The nation sent a team in one of the three team competitions, winning a bronze medal.

=== Artistic ===
Gymnast	Events	Final	
Gymnast	Events	Result	Rank
William Cowhig	All-around	104.50	29
Leonard Hanson	All-around	121.25	12
Samuel Hodgetts	All-around	108.50	25
Reginald Potts	All-around	101.75	32
Charles Simmons	All-around	105.50	28
John Whitaker	All-around	111.25	21
Great Britain	Team	36.90	3rd place, bronze medalist(s)

== Modern pentathlon ==
Great Britain had three competitors in the first Olympic pentathlon competition. Two of the British pentathletes finished in the top ten.

(The scoring system was point-for-place in each of the five events, with the smallest point total winning.)

Athlete	Shooting		Swimming		Fencing			Riding			Running		Total points	Rank
Athlete	Score	Points	Time	Points	Wins	Touches	Points	Penalties	Time	Points	Time	Points	Total points	Rank
Ralph Clilverd	172	13	4:58.4	1	16	16	9	81	15:46.4	23	24:06.2	18	63	9
Hugh Durant	191	4	10:07.0	28	17	19	7	5	10:00.4	18	24:37.5	21	78	18
Douglas Godfree	166	16	5:54.0	6	12	15	17	0	11:43.9	11	22:08.3	13	63	9

== Rowing ==
Twenty four rowers represented Great Britain. It was the nation's third appearance in rowing. Britain was nearly as dominant in the sport as they had been four years earlier, winning two of the three events British rowers entered and placing all four boats in the finals. The only British loss, other than in the Britain-only eights final, came in the coxed fours as the British boat took silver after coming in second to a German boat in the final. In all, Great Britain took two gold medals and two silvers; the best possible finish would have been three golds and one silver.

(Ranks given are within each crew's heat.)

Rower	Event	Heats		Quarterfinals		Semifinals		Final	
Rower	Event	Result	Rank	Result	Rank	Result	Rank	Result	Rank
Wally Kinnear	Single sculls	7:44.0	1 Q	7:49.9	1 Q	7:37.0	1 Q	7:47.3	1st place, gold medalist(s)
Julius Beresford; Geoffrey Carr (cox); Bruce Logan; Charles Rought; Karl Vernon	Coxed four	7:27.0	1 Q	7:14.5	1 Q	7:04.8	1 Q	Unknown	2nd place, silver medalist(s)
Robert Bourne; Beaufort Burdekin; William Fison; Thomas Gillespie; Charles Littlejohn; William Parker; Frederick Pitman; John Walker (cox); Arthur Wiggins	Eight	6:42.5	1 Q	6:19.0	1 Q	7:47.0	1 Q	6:19.2	2nd place, silver medalist(s)
Edgar Burgess; Philip Fleming; Stanley Garton; James Angus Gillan; Ewart Horsfall; Alister Kirby; Sidney Swann; Henry Wells (cox); Leslie Wormald	Eight	6:22.2	1 Q	6:10.2	1 Q	6:16.2	1 Q	6:15.7	1st place, gold medalist(s)

== Shooting ==
Thirty-eight shooters competed for Great Britain. It was the nation's fourth appearance in shooting. The British team won a total of nine medals, including one gold. Six of the nation's medals came in team events; the Britons won a medal in each team event in which they competed.

Shooter	Event	Final	
Shooter	Event	Result	Rank
Alfred Black	Trap	11	53
Henry Burr	600 m free rifle	87	10
Henry Burt	50 m rifle, prone	192	3rd place, bronze medalist(s)
Henry Burt	25 m small-bore rifle	222	9
John Butt	Trap	84	17
Robert Davies	600 m free rifle	78	37
Robert Davies	300 m military rifle, 3 pos.	81	39
Hugh Durant	50 m pistol	433	20
Arthur Fulton	600 m free rifle	87	9
Arthur Fulton	300 m military rifle, 3 pos.	92	6
John Goodwin	Trap	10	56
David Griffiths	50 m rifle, prone	184	24
David Griffiths	25 m small-bore rifle	192	29
William Grosvenor	Trap	85	16
Harold Humby	Trap	88	4
Peter Jones	50 m pistol	417	32
Francis Kemp	50 m rifle, prone	190	5
Francis Kemp	25 m small-bore rifle	206	23
Albert Kempster	50 m pistol	426	24
Edward Lessimore	50 m rifle, prone	192	4
Edward Lessimore	25 m small-bore rifle	218	12
Langford Lloyd	300 m military rifle, 3 pos.	74	57
Alexander Maunder	Trap	13	45
William McClure	300 m military rifle, 3 pos.	68	69
William McClure	50 m pistol	411	35
William McClure	30 m rapid fire pistol	180	41
William Milne	50 m rifle, prone	193	2nd place, silver medalist(s)
William Milne	25 m small-bore rifle	212	22
Robert Murray	50 m rifle, prone	190	6
Robert Murray	25 m small-bore rifle	228	5
Harcourt Ommundsen	600 m free rifle	88	7
Charles Palmer	Trap	82	21
Edward Parnell	600 m free rifle	84	18
Edward Parnell	300 m military rifle, 3 pos.	75	56
Joseph Pepé	50 m rifle, prone	187	14
Joseph Pepé	25 m small-bore rifle	231	4
William Pimm	50 m rifle, prone	189	10
William Pimm	25 m small-bore rifle	225	7
George Pinchard	Trap	33	39
Philip Plater	600 m free rifle	90	5
Philip Plater	300 m military rifle, 3 pos.	49	86
Horatio Poulter	50 m pistol	461	6
James Reid	600 m free rifle	86	13
Philip Richardson	600 m free rifle	79	33
Philip Richardson	300 m military rifle, 3 pos.	69	65
John Sedgewick	600 m free rifle	80	31
John Sedgewick	300 m military rifle, 3 pos.	81	38
Edward Skilton	600 m free rifle	85	16
John Somers	600 m free rifle	74	46
John Somers	300 m military rifle, 3 pos.	75	54
Charles Stewart	50 m pistol	470	3rd place, bronze medalist(s)
William Styles	50 m rifle, prone	179	27
William Styles	25 m small-bore rifle	216	13
Edward Tickell	50 m pistol	387	45
Fleetwood Varley	600 m free rifle	81	27
Fleetwood Varley	300 m military rifle, 3 pos.	76	50
George Whitaker	Trap	38	29
Hugh Durant; Albert Kempster; Horatio Poulter; Charles Stewart	30 m team military pistol	1107	3rd place, bronze medalist(s)
Hugh Durant; Albert Kempster; Horatio Poulter; Charles Stewart	50 m team military pistol	1804	3rd place, bronze medalist(s)
Edward Lessimore; Robert Murray; Joseph Pepé; William Pimm	50 m team small-bore rifle	762	1st place, gold medalist(s)
William Milne; Joseph Pepé; William Pimm; William Styles	25 m team small-bore rifle	917	2nd place, silver medalist(s)
John Butt; William Grosvenor; Harold Humby; Alexander Maunder; Charles Palmer; George Whitaker	Team clay pigeons	511	2nd place, silver medalist(s)
Henry Burr; Arthur Fulton; Harcourt Ommundsen; Edward Parnell; James Reid; Edward Skilton	Team rifle	1602	2nd place, silver medalist(s)

== Tennis ==
Eleven tennis players, including three women, represented Great Britain at the 1912 Games. It was the nation's fourth appearance in tennis, having missed only 1904.

The British men started strong, advancing four of the eight individuals to the indoor singles quarterfinals and three of the four pairs to the same level (with none facing each other, no less). Dixon's semifinal win was the only one garnered by the men, however, and the team gathered only his silver medal and a bronze by Dixon and Beamish in the doubles. The women fared better, with Hannam and Parton meeting in the semifinals before taking the gold and silver medals, respectively, in the indoor singles. Great Britain's best results, however, came in the mixed pairs—the only losses by British mixed pairs were to other British sides. The layout of the draw resulted in gold and silver medals and a fifth-place finish for the three pairs.

Men

Athlete	Event	Round of 32	Round of 16	Quarterfinals	Semifinals	Final	
Athlete	Event	Opposition Score	Opposition Score	Opposition Score	Opposition Score	Opposition Score	Rank
Herbert Barrett	Indoor singles	Bye	Setterwall (SWE); L 4-6, 6-1, 6-4, 6-8, 6-4	Did not advance			9
Alfred Beamish	Indoor singles	Germot (FRA); L 4-6, 6-2, 4-6, 6-2, 6-4	Did not advance				16
George Caridia	Indoor singles	Möller (SWE); W 6-2, 7-5, 3-6, 6-4	Gore (GBR); W 6-2, 9-7, 7-5	Wilding (ANZ); L 6-1, 6-2, 6-2	Did not advance		5
Charles Dixon	Indoor singles	Bye	Mavrogordato (GBR); W 6-2, 9-7, 4-6, 10-8	Robětín (BOH); W 6-2, 6-4, 6-1	Wilding (ANZ); W 6-0, 4-6, 6-4, 6-4	Gobert (FRA); L 8-6, 6-4, 6-4	2nd place, silver medalist(s)
Arthur Gore	Indoor singles	Leffler (SWE); W 7-5, 6-4, 7-5	Caridia (GBR); L 6-2, 9-7, 7-5	Did not advance			9
Arthur Lowe	Indoor singles	Boström (SWE); W 5-7, 6-4, 6-4, 6-4	Germot (FRA); W 6-4, 3-6, 6-1, 6-4	Gobert (FRA); L 6-1, 6-1, 6-3	Did not advance		5
Francis Lowe	Indoor singles	Bye	Wennergren (SWE); W 6-4, 6-1, 6-4	Setterwall (SWE); W 6-4, 1-6, 6-3, 8-6	Gobert (FRA); L 6-4, 10-8, 2-6, 2-6, 6-2	Wilding (ANZ); W 4-6, 6-2, 7-5, 6-0	4
Theodore Mavrogordato	Indoor singles	Bye	Dixon (GBR); L 6-2, 9-7, 4-6, 10-8	Did not advance			9
Herbert Barrett; Arthur Gore	Indoor doubles	N/A	Bye	Benckert & Boström (SWE); W 7-5, 6-4, 6-1	Kempe & Setterwall (SWE); L 4-6, 3-6, 6-1, 6-4, 6-3	Beamish & Dixon (GBR); L 6-2, 0-6, 10-8, 2-6, 6-3	4
Alfred Beamish; Charles Dixon	Indoor doubles	N/A	Bye	Bye	Germot & Gobert (FRA); L 6-3, 6-1, 6-2	Barrett & Gore (GBR); W 6-2, 0-6, 10-8, 2-6, 6-3	3rd place, bronze medalist(s)
George Caridia; Theodore Mavrogordato	Indoor doubles	N/A	Setterwall & Kempe (SWE); L 6-4, 4-6, 6-8, 6-2, 6-3	Did not advance			7
Arthur Lowe; Francis Lowe	Indoor doubles	N/A	Nylén & Wennergren (SWE); W 9-7, 11-9, 6-2	Germot & Gobert (FRA); L 3-6, 6-8, 6-4, 6-2, 6-3	Did not advance		5

Women

Athlete	Event	Round of 16	Quarterfinals	Semifinals	Final	
Athlete	Event	Opposition Score	Opposition Score	Opposition Score	Opposition Score	Rank
Francis Aitchison	Indoor singles	Bye	Castenschiold (DEN); L 2-6, 6-2, 6-1	Did not advance		5
Edith Hannam	Indoor singles	Bye	Arnheim (SWE); W 7-5, 6-1	Parton (GBR); W 7-5, 6-2	Castenschiold (DEN); W 6-4, 6-3	1st place, gold medalist(s)
Mabel Parton	Indoor singles	Cederschiöld (SWE); W 6-0, 6-1	Bye	Hannam (GBR); L 7-5, 6-2	Fick (SWE); W 6-3, 6-3	3rd place, bronze medalist(s)

Mixed

Athlete	Event	Round of 16	Quarterfinals	Semifinals	Final	
Athlete	Event	Opposition Score	Opposition Score	Opposition Score	Opposition Score	Rank
Francis Aitchison; Herbert Barrett	Indoor doubles	Arnheim & Nylén (SWE); W 6-2, 6-4	Castenschiold & Larsen (DEN); W 6-0, 6-3	Fick & Setterwall (SWE); W 3-6, 6-1, 6-2	Dixon & Hannam (GBR); L 4-6, 6-3, 6-2	2nd place, silver medalist(s)
Charles Dixon; Edith Hannam	Indoor doubles	Bye	Mavrogordato & Parton (GBR); W 6-3, 6-0	Cederschiöld & Kempe (SWE); W 6-2, 6-2	Aitchison & Barrett (GBR); W 4-6, 6-3, 6-2	1st place, gold medalist(s)
Theodore Mavrogordato; Mabel Parton	Indoor doubles	Hay & Möller (SWE); W 6-3, 6-0	Dixon & Hannam (GBR); L 6-3, 6-0	Did not advance		5

== Tug of war ==
Britain competed in Olympic tug of war for the second time. The reigning champions, the City of London Police, were one of only two teams to compete. The eight-man team included three members of the 1908 squad. They challenged the host Stockholm Police in a best-of-three match. The Londoners were pulled across the line in the first pull, then gave a mighty struggle in the second. This second pull resulted in neither team being able to pull the other across, but the British team succumbed to exhaustion first as some of its members sank to the ground to give Sweden the victory.

Athlete	Event	Final	
Athlete	Event	Opposition Score	Rank
City of London Police	Tug of war	Stockholm Police (SWE); L 0-2	2nd place, silver medalist(s)

== Wrestling ==
=== Greco-Roman ===
Great Britain sent 12 wrestlers in its third Olympic wrestling appearance. Barrett and MacKenzie were the only two wrestlers to win any matches, taking one bout each. The team finished with an overall 2-24 record.

Wrestler	Class	First round	Second round	Third round	Fourth round	Fifth round	Sixth round	Seventh round	Final			
Wrestler	Class	Opposition Result	Opposition Result	Opposition Result	Opposition Result	Opposition Result	Opposition Result	Opposition Result	Match A Opposition Result	Match B Opposition Result	Match C Opposition Result	Rank
Edgar Bacon	Middleweight	Asikainen (FIN); L	Lundstein (FIN); L	Did not advance								26
Stanley Bacon	Middleweight	Polis (RUS); L	Asikainen (FIN); L	Did not advance								26
Edward Barrett	Heavyweight	Jensen (DEN); L	Farnest (RUS); W	Backenius (FIN); L	Did not advance			N/A	Did not advance			9
Percy Cockings	Featherweight	Lehmusvirta (FIN); L	Leivonen (FIN); L	Did not advance								26
Arthur Gould	Lightweight	Márkus (HUN); L	Did not start	Did not advance								47
William Hayes	Lightweight	Kaplur (RUS); L	Pukkila (FIN); L	Did not advance								31
William Lupton	Lightweight	Frydenlund (NOR); L	Balej (BOH); L	Did not advance								31
George MacKenzie	Featherweight	Meesits (RUS); W	Pereira (POR); L	Did not start	Did not advance							24
Robert Phelps	Lightweight	Björklund (SWE); L	Lund (SWE); L	Did not advance								31
Noel Rhys	Middleweight	Tirkkonen (FIN); L	Totuschek (AUT); L	Did not advance								26
William Ruff	Lightweight	Balej (BOH); L	Frydenlund (NOR); L	Did not advance								31
Alfred Taylor	Featherweight	Öberg (SWE); L	Åkesson (SWE); L	Did not advance								26
