= France at the 1912 Summer Olympics =

- IOC code: FRA
- NOC: French Olympic Committee

in Stockholm
- Competitors: 119 (118 men and 1 woman) in 13 sports
- Medals Ranked 5th: Gold 7 Silver 4 Bronze 3 Total 14

Summer Olympics appearances (overview)
- 1896; 1900; 1904; 1908; 1912; 1920; 1924; 1928; 1932; 1936; 1948; 1952; 1956; 1960; 1964; 1968; 1972; 1976; 1980; 1984; 1988; 1992; 1996; 2000; 2004; 2008; 2012; 2016; 2020; 2024

Other related appearances
- 1906 Intercalated Games

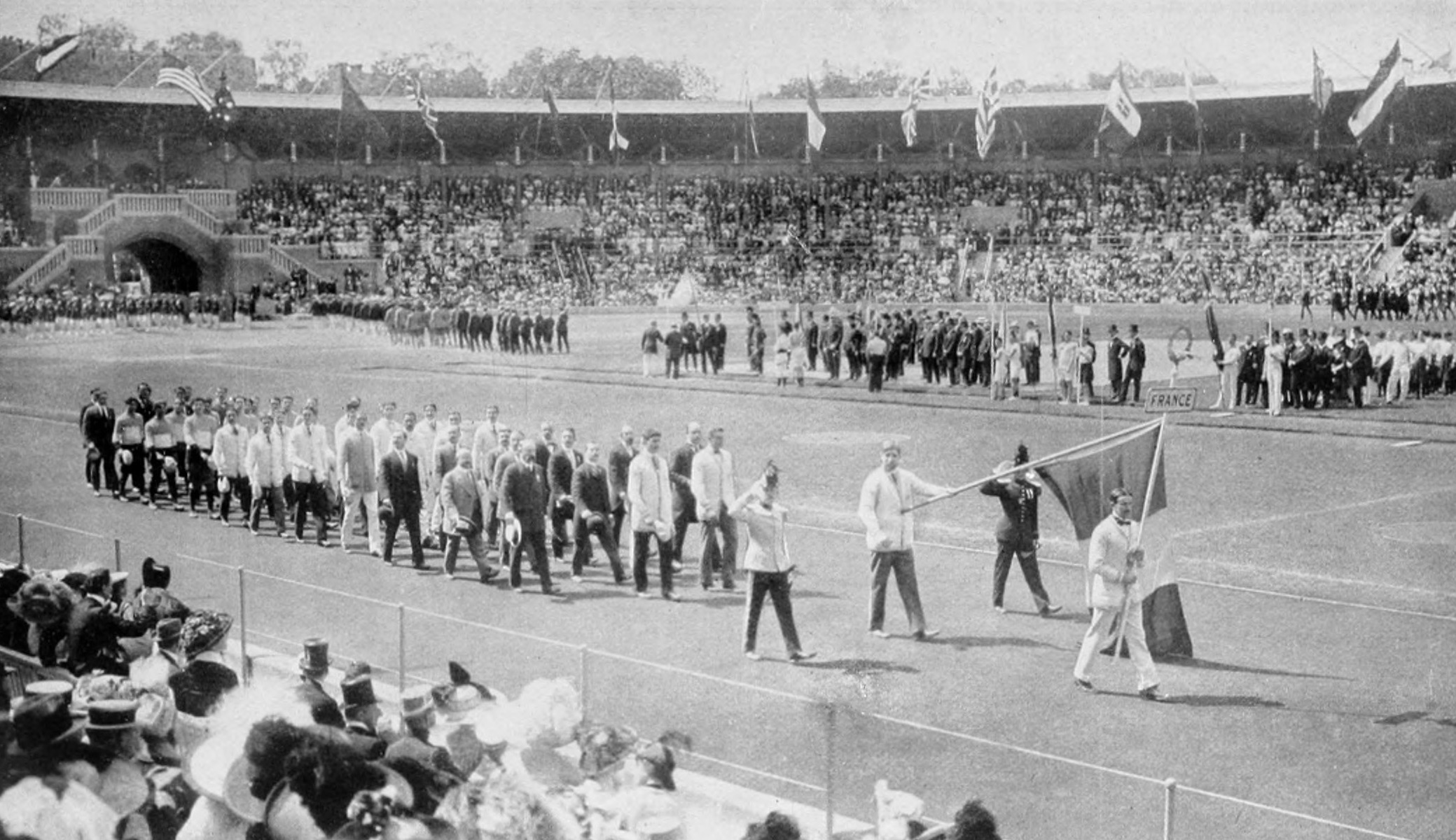
The team of France at the opening ceremony.

France competed at the 1912 Summer Olympics in Stockholm, Sweden. 119 competitors, 118 men and 1 woman, took part in 66 events in 13 sports.

== Medalists ==
=== Gold ===
- Jacques Cariou — Equestrian, Individual jumping
- Gaston Thubé, Jacques Thubé and Amédée Thubé — Sailing, Men's 6m class
- Paul Colas — Shooting, Men's 300m free rifle, three positions
- Paul Colas — Shooting, Men's 600m free rifle
- André Gobert and Maurice Germot — Tennis, Men's doubles indoor
- André Gobert — Tennis, Men's singles indoor
- Marguerite Broquedis — Tennis, Women's singles outdoor

=== Silver ===
- Charles Poulenard, Pierre Failliot, Charles Lelong and Robert Schurrer — Athletics, Men's 4 × 400 m Relay
- Jean Bouin — Athletics, Men's 5000m
- Louis Ségura — Gymnastics, Men's all-around
- Pierre Dufour d'Astafort, Jacques Cariou, Ernest Meyer and Gaston Seigner — Equestrian, Team jumping

=== Bronze ===
- Jacques Cariou — Equestrian, Individual eventing
- Albert Canet and Eduard Meny De Marangue — Tennis, Men's doubles outdoor
- Marguerite Broquedis and Albert Canet — Tennis, Mixed doubles outdoor

== Aquatics ==
=== Swimming ===
Three swimmers competed for France at the 1912 Games. It was the third time the nation had competed in swimming. None of the three French swimmers advanced past the quarterfinals in any event.

Ranks given for each swimmer are within the heat.

Men

Swimmer	Events	Heat		Quarterfinal		Semifinal		Final	
Swimmer	Events	Result	Rank	Result	Rank	Result	Rank	Result	Rank
André Caby	1500 m freestyle	N/A		did not finish		did not advance			
Gérard Meister	100 m freestyle	1:16.6	4	did not advance					
Georges Rigal	100 m freestyle	1:17.8	2 Q	did not start		did not advance			

=== Water polo ===
France made its second appearance in Olympic water polo in 1912; it was the nation's first showing since 1900. The 1912 French team had little success, losing to Sweden and then Belgium to be eliminated from the tournament.

Team	Event	Quarterfinals	Semifinals	Finals	Repechage semifinal	Repechage final	Silver round 1	Silver round 2	Silver match	Rank
Team	Event	Opposition Score	Opposition Score	Opposition Score	Opposition Score	Opposition Score	Opposition Score	Opposition Score	Opposition Score	Rank
France	Water polo	Sweden; L 2–7	did not advance		Bye	Belgium; L 1–4	did not advance			5

Quarterfinals

July 8, 1912	France	2–7	Sweden	Djurgårdsbrunnsviken
July 8, 1912	Decoin, Provost	Goals	R. Andersson (3), Bergqvist (3), ?	Djurgårdsbrunnsviken

Repechage final

July 11, 1912	France	1–4	Belgium	Djurgårdsbrunnsviken
July 11, 1912	?	Goals	?	Djurgårdsbrunnsviken

== Athletics ==
32 athletes represented France. It was the fourth appearance of the nation in athletics, which France appeared in each time the nation appeared at the Olympics. Jean Bouin set a new Olympic record in the 5000 metres in the semifinals, holding it only until the final. Despite dropping another nearly 30 seconds off his time in the final, he came in second a mere .1 seconds behind Hannes Kolehmainen of Finland. The French 4x400 metre relay also took a silver medal to bring the nation's total in athletics to 2 silver medals.

Ranks given are within that athlete's heat for running events.

Athlete	Events	Heat		Semifinal		Final	
Athlete	Events	Result	Rank	Result	Rank	Result	Rank
Ben Allel	Marathon	N/A				did not start	
Géo André	110 m hurdles	16.8	2	?	3	did not advance	
Géo André	High jump	N/A		1.70	23	did not advance	
Géo André	Standing long jump	N/A		3.02	14	did not advance	
Géo André	Standing high jump	N/A		1.45	7	did not advance	
Géo André	Pentathlon	N/A				Elim-3 60	22
Géo André	Decathlon	N/A				4675.200	17
Henri Arnaud	1500 m	N/A		4:05.4	2	?	9–14
Jean Bouin	5000 m	N/A		15:05.0 OR	1	14:36.7	2nd place, silver medalist(s)
Jean Bouin	Ind. cross country	N/A				did not finish	
Julien Boullery	100 m	?	3	did not advance			
Renon Boissière	Marathon	N/A				2:51:06.6	13
André Campana	Long jump	N/A		6.64	16	did not advance	
Jean Capelle	Marathon	N/A				did not start	
Joseph Caulle	800 m	?	5	did not advance			
Paul Coulond	Marathon	N/A				did not start	
Marius Delaby	100 m	?	3	did not advance			
Marius Delaby	110 m hurdles	16.0	1	16.2	3	did not advance	
Marius Delaby	High jump	N/A		No mark	34	did not advance	
Ahmed Djebelia	Marathon	N/A				did not start	
Armand Estang	High jump	N/A		No mark	34	did not advance	
Pierre Failliot	100 m	?	3	did not advance			
Pierre Failliot	200 m	?	3	did not advance			
Pierre Failliot	Pentathlon	N/A				Elim-3 42	17
Pierre Failliot	Decathlon	N/A				2104.650	24
Fernand Gonder	Pole vault	N/A		3.50	15	did not advance	
Gaston Heuet	5000 m	N/A		did not finish		did not advance	
Gaston Heuet	10000 m	N/A		34:50.0	3	did not start	
Gaston Heuet	Marathon	N/A				did not start	
André Labat	High jump	N/A		1.75	13	did not advance	
Charles Lagarde	Shot put	N/A		9.41	22	did not advance	
Charles Lagarde	Discus throw	N/A		32.35	36	did not advance	
Charles Lelong	100 m	?	3	did not advance			
Charles Lelong	200 m	?	3	did not advance			
Charles Lelong	400 m	50.2	1	?	3	did not advance	
Jean Lespielle	Marathon	N/A				did not start	
Henry Lorgnat	Marathon	N/A				did not start	
Georges Malfait	200 m	?	5	did not advance			
Georges Malfait	400 m	?	3	did not advance			
Michel Meerz	High jump	N/A		1.60	28	did not advance	
Alfred Motté	Standing long jump	N/A		3.10	10	did not advance	
René Mourlon	100 m	?	2	?	5	did not advance	
Edmond Neyrinck	Marathon	N/A				did not start	
Raoul Paoli	Shot put	N/A		11.11	16	did not advance	
Louis Pauteux	Marathon	N/A				did not finish	
Charles Poulenard	200 m	?	3	did not advance			
Charles Poulenard	400 m	50.7	2	?	5	did not advance	
Charles Poulenard	800 m	?	3	did not advance			
Georges Rolot	100 m	?	4	did not advance			
Georges Rolot	200 m	22.7	2	?	3	did not advance	
Georges Rolot	400 m	?	5	did not advance			
Robert Schurrer	100 m	?	4	did not advance			
Robert Schurrer	200 m	?	2	?	5	did not advance	
Robert Schurrer	400 m	?	5	did not advance			
André Tison	Shot put	N/A		12.41	9	did not advance	
André Tison	Discus throw	N/A		34.73	30	did not advance	
Pierre Failliot; Charles Lelong; René Mourlon; Georges Rolot	4 × 100 m	43.8	2	did not advance			
Pierre Failliot; Charles Lelong; Charles Poulenard; Robert Schurrer	4 × 400 m	N/A		3:22.5	1	3:20.7	2nd place, silver medalist(s)

== Cycling ==
Twelve cyclists represented France. It was the fourth appearance of the nation in cycling, which had only not competed in cycling in 1904. Joseph Racine had the best time in the time trial, the only race held, placing 40th. The French team included the four slowest finishers as well as 3 of the 29 cyclists not to finish. The top four French cyclists had a combined time that placed them 10th of the 15 teams.

=== Road cycling ===
Cyclist	Events	Final	
Cyclist	Events	Result	Rank
Gaston Alancourt	Ind. time trial	14:23:59.3	91
Louis Bes	Ind. time trial	did not finish	
André Capelle	Ind. time trial	11:59:48.4	50
Etienne Chéret	Ind. time trial	14:15:18.1	89
René Gagnet	Ind. time trial	12:20:32.6	64
André Lepère	Ind. time trial	15:03:18.1	93
Jacques Marcault	Ind. time trial	did not finish	
Alexis Michiels	Ind. time trial	15:15:59.2	94
Pierre Peinaud	Ind. time trial	14:49:59.4	92
Joseph Racine	Ind. time trial	11:50:32.7	40
René Rillon	Ind. time trial	did not finish	
Georges Valentin	Ind. time trial	13:33:59.5	83
Georges Valentin	Ind. time trial	13:33:59.5	83
André Capelle; René Gagnet; Joseph Racine; Georges Valentin	Team time trial	49:44:35.2	10

== Equestrian ==
Dressage

Rider	Horse	Event	Final	
Rider	Horse	Event	Penalties	Rank
Jacques Cariou	Mignon	Individual	94	14
Pierre Dufour d'Astafort	Castibalza	Individual	123	109
Gaston Seigner	Dignité	Individual	73	10

Eventing

(The maximum score in each of the five events was 10.00 points. Ranks given are for the cumulative score after each event. Team score is the sum of the top three individual scores.)

Rider	Horse	Event	Long distance		Cross country		Steeplechase		Show jumping		Dressage		Total	
Rider	Horse	Event	Score	Rank	Score	Rank	Score	Rank	Score	Rank	Score	Rank	Score	Rank
Jacques Cariou	Cocotte	Individual	10.00	1	10.00	1	10.00	1	8.60	11	7.72	3	46.32	3rd place, bronze medalist(s)
Pierre Dufour d'Astafort	Castibalza	Individual	10.00	1	Disqualified		Retired						did not finish	
Ernest Meyer	Allons-y	Individual	10.00	1	10.00	1	10.00	1	9.53	1	5.77	12	45.30	12
Gaston Seigner	Dignité	Individual	9.00	26	9.23	22	10.00	17	9.33	15	7.59	14	45.14	14
Jacques Cariou; Ernest Meyer; Gaston Seigner; Pierre Dufour d'Astafort	Cocotte; Allons-y; Dignité; Castibalza	Team	29.00		29.23		30.00		27.46		21.08		136.77	4

Jumping

(Team score is the sum of the top three individual scores.)

Rider	Horse	Event	Final	
Rider	Horse	Event	Penalties	Rank
Jacques Cariou	Mignon	Individual	4	1st place, gold medalist(s)
Pierre Dufour d'Astafort	Amazone	Individual	11	13
Ernest Meyer	Ursule	Individual	did not finish	
Jacques Cariou; Pierre Dufour d'Astafort; Ernest Meyer; Gaston Seigner	Mignon; Amazone; Allons-y; Cocotte	Team	32	2nd place, silver medalist(s)

== Gymnastics ==
Six gymnasts represented France. It was the fourth appearance of the nation in gymnastics, in which France had not competed only in 1904. Louis Ségura, the defending bronze medalist, earned the silver in the individual all-around. France did not enter a team in any of the team competitions.

=== Artistic ===
Gymnast	Events	Final	
Gymnast	Events	Result	Rank
Antoine Costa	All-around	124.50	10
Marcel Lalu	All-around	127.00	7
Louis-Charles Marty	All-around	122.50	11
Auguste Pompogne	All-around	118.00	14
Louis Ségura	All-around	132.50	2nd place, silver medalist(s)
Marco Torrès	All-around	127.00	7

== Modern pentathlon ==
France had two competitors in the first Olympic pentathlon competition. The French pentathletes placed 15th and 19th among the 22 finishers.

(The scoring system was point-for-place in each of the five events, with the smallest point total winning.)

Athlete	Shooting		Swimming		Fencing			Riding			Running		Total points	Rank
Athlete	Score	Points	Time	Points	Wins	Touches	Points	Penalties	Time	Points	Time	Points	Total points	Rank
Georges Brulé	100	29	7:04.4	18	16	13	8	38	13:44.6	22	20:48.4	7	83	19
Jean de Mas Latrie	161	16	10:03.0	27	23	25	2	0	11:26.0	10	24:17.4	19	73	15

== Rowing ==
Seventeen rowers represented France. It was the nation's second appearance in rowing, and first since the nation hosted the 1900 Summer Olympics. No French boat reached the semifinals.

(Ranks given are within each crew's heat.)

Rower	Event	Heats		Quarterfinals		Semifinals		Final	
Rower	Event	Result	Rank	Result	Rank	Result	Rank	Result	Rank
Pierre Alibert; François Elichagaray (cox); André Mirambeau; René Saintongey; Louis Thomaturgé	Coxed four	Unknown	2	did not advance					
François Elichagaray (cox); Charles Garnier; Alphonse Meignant; Gabriel Poix; Auguste Richard	Coxed four, inriggers	N/A		Unknown	2	did not advance			
Pierre Alvarez; Jean Arné; Joseph Campot; François Elichagaray (cox); Jean Elichagaray; Louis Lafitte; Marius Lejeune; Étienne Lesbats; Gabriel St. Laurent	Eight	Unknown	2	did not advance					

== Sailing ==
Three sailors, a set of brothers, represented France. It was the nation's third appearance in sailing, in which France had competed each time the sport was held at the Olympics. France's single boat took the gold medal in the six metre class, winning a two-boat race-off after tying in the standings after the first two races.

(7 points for 1st in each race, 3 points for 2nd, 1 point for 3rd. Race-off to break ties in total points if necessary for medal standings.)

Sailors	Event	Race 1			Race 2			Total		
Sailors	Event	Time	Points	Rank	Time	Points	Rank	Points	Race-off	Rank
Amédée Thubé; Gaston Thubé; Jacques Thubé	6 metre class	2:25:20	3	2	2:23:44	7	1	10	2:38:48	1st place, gold medalist(s)

== Shooting ==
Nineteen shooters represented France. It was the nation's fourth appearance in shooting, in which France had not competed only in 1904. Paul Colas won a pair of gold medals, the only medals France won in 1912 and the first golds the nation had won since 1900.

Shooter	Event	Final	
Shooter	Event	Result	Rank
Paul Colas	300 m free rifle, 3 pos.	987	1st place, gold medalist(s)
Paul Colas	600 m free rifle	94	1st place, gold medalist(s)
Paul Colas	300 m military rifle, 3 pos.	86	22
Edoard Creuzé	Trap	14	41
Raoul de Boigne	300 m free rifle, 3 pos.	806	53
Raoul de Boigne	600 m free rifle	73	50
Raoul de Boigne	300 m military rifle, 3 pos.	73	58
Henri de Castex	30 m rapid fire pistol	140	42
Henri de Castex	Trap	38	29
Georges de Crequi-Montfort	30 m rapid fire pistol	263	26
Georges de Crequi-Montfort	Trap	36	35
Charles de Jaubert	100 m deer, double shots	60	10
Charles de Jaubert	30 m rapid fire pistol	229	36
Charles de Jaubert	Trap	77	25
Maurice Fauré	30 m rapid fire pistol	250	31
André Fleury	Trap	74	27
Pierre Gentil	300 m free rifle, 3 pos.	did not finish	
Pierre Gentil	600 m free rifle	65	69
Pierre Gentil	300 m military rifle, 3 pos.	71	61
Pierre Gentil	25 m small-bore rifle	176	27
Maxime Landin	300 m military rifle, 3 pos.	67	70
Léon Johnson	300 m free rifle, 3 pos.	908	24
Léon Johnson	25 m small-bore rifle	203	19
Léon Johnson	50 m pistol	454	10
Henri le Marié	Trap	12	51
Auguste Marion	300 m free rifle, 3 pos.	868	45
Auguste Marion	600 m free rifle	69	63
Daniel Mérillon	600 m free rifle	69	64
Daniel Mérillon	300 m military rifle, 3 pos.	62	78
Louis Percy	300 m free rifle, 3 pos.	868	44
Louis Percy	600 m free rifle	83	20
Louis Percy	300 m military rifle, 3 pos.	85	23
André Regaud	50 m rifle, prone	125	41
André Regaud	50 m pistol	447	15
Edmond Sandoz	30 m rapid fire pistol	272	12
Athanase Sartori	300 m free rifle, 3 pos.	754	63
Athanase Sartori	600 m free rifle	32	84
Athanase Sartori	300 m military rifle, 3 pos.	38	90
René Texier	Trap	13	45
Georges de Crequi-Montfort; Charles de Jaubert; Maurice Fauré; Edmond Sandoz	30 m team military pistol	1041	6
Pierre Gentil; Léon Johnson; Maxime Landin; André Regaud	50 m team small-bore rifle	714	4
Edoard Creuzé; Henri de Castex; Georges de Crequi-Montfort; Charles de Jaubert; André Fleury; René Texier	Team clay pigeons	90	6
Paul Colas; Raoul de Boigne; Pierre Gentil; Léon Johnson; Maxime Landin; Louis Percy	Team rifle	1515	5
Paul Colas; Raoul de Boigne; Pierre Gentil; Léon Johnson; Auguste Marion; Louis Percy	Team free rifle	5471	4

== Tennis ==
Six tennis players, including one woman, represented France at the 1912 Games. It was the nation's fourth appearance in tennis, having missed only 1904. The lone French woman, Broquedis, won the women's outdoor singles event while Gobert took the men's indoor singles championship. The indoor men's doubles pair also won, giving Gobert two gold medals. Broquedis had a second medal, taking the bronze along with Canet in the outdoor mixed pairs. Canet finished with a pair of bronzes, his other one coming in partnership with Mény in the men's outdoor doubles.

Men

Athlete	Event	Round of 128	Round of 64	Round of 32	Round of 16	Quarterfinals	Semifinals	Final	
Athlete	Event	Opposition Score	Opposition Score	Opposition Score	Opposition Score	Opposition Score	Opposition Score	Opposition Score	Rank
François Blanchy	Outdoor singles	Bye	Hykš-Černý (BOH); W 5–7, 6–1, 6–2, 6–1	Tapscott (RSA); L 1–6, 5–7, 6–3, 6–4, 6–4	did not advance				17
Albert Canet	Outdoor singles	Bye	Langaard (NOR); W 6–3, 6–0, 6–1	Pell (USA); L 6–2, 6–3, 6–4	did not advance				17
Maurice Germot	Indoor singles	N/A		Beamish (GBR); W 4–6, 6–2, 4–6, 6–2, 6–4	Lowe (GBR); L 6–4, 3–6, 6–1, 6–4	did not advance			9
André Gobert	Indoor singles	N/A		Larsen (DEN); W 8–6, 6–1, 5–7, 8–6	Kempe (SWE); W 6–1, 6–2, 7–5	Lowe (GBR); W 6–1, 6–1, 6–3	Lowe (GBR); W 6–4, 10–8, 2–6, 2–6, 6–2	Dixon (GBR); W 8–6, 6–4, 6–4	1st place, gold medalist(s)
Edouard Mény de Marangue	Outdoor singles	Bye	Heyden (GER); L 7–9, 4–6, 6–2, 7–5, 6–1	did not advance					31
Albert Canet; Edouard Mény de Marangue	Outdoor doubles	N/A		Bye	Schomburgk & von Müller (GER); W 6–8, 6–3, 6–2, 6–3	Alejnicyn & Sumarokow (RUS); W 6–3, 6–0, 6–1	Pipes & Zborzil (AUT); L 7–5, 2–6, 3–6, 10–8, 10–8	Just & Žemla-Rázný (BOH); W 13–11, 6–3, 8–6	3rd place, bronze medalist(s)
Maurice Germot; André Gobert	Indoor doubles	N/A			Bye	Lowe & Lowe (GBR); W 3–6, 6–8, 6–4, 6–2, 6–3	Beamish & Dixon (GBR); W 6–3, 6–1, 6–2	Setterwall & Kempe (SWE); W 6–4, 12–14, 6–2, 6–4	1st place, gold medalist(s)

Women

Athlete	Event	Round of 16	Quarterfinals	Semifinals	Final	
Athlete	Event	Opposition Score	Opposition Score	Opposition Score	Opposition Score	Rank
Marguerite Broquedis	Outdoor singles	Bye	Cederschiöld (SWE); W 6–1, 6–4	Bjurstedt (NOR); W 6–3, 2–6, 6–4	Köring (GER); W 4–6, 6–3, 6–4	1st place, gold medalist(s)

Mixed

Athlete	Event	Round of 16	Quarterfinals	Semifinals	Final	
Athlete	Event	Opposition Score	Opposition Score	Opposition Score	Opposition Score	Rank
Marguerite Broquedis; Albert Canet	Outdoor doubles	Arnheim & Nylén (SWE); W 6–2, 6–4	Bye	Köring & Schomburgk (GER); L 6–2, 6–3	Bye	3rd place, bronze medalist(s)

== Wrestling ==
=== Greco-Roman ===
France was represented by six wrestlers in its Olympic wrestling debut. None of the six was able to win a single match, each being eliminated after losing their first two bouts.

Wrestler	Class	First round	Second round	Third round	Fourth round	Fifth round	Sixth round	Seventh round	Final			
Wrestler	Class	Opposition Result	Opposition Result	Opposition Result	Opposition Result	Opposition Result	Opposition Result	Opposition Result	Match A Opposition Result	Match B Opposition Result	Match C Opposition Result	Rank
Adrien Barrier	Middleweight	Andersson (SWE); L	Victal (POR); L	did not advance								26
Jean Bouffechoux	Lightweight	Salonen (FIN); L	Väre (FIN); L	did not advance								31
Raymond Cabal	Lightweight	Lofthus (NOR); L	Mathiasson (SWE); L	did not advance								31
Eugène Lesieur	Lightweight	Wikström (FIN); L	Orosz (HUN); L	did not advance								31
Edouard Martin	Light heavyweight	Böhling (FIN); L	Ahlgren (SWE); L	did not advance				N/A	did not advance			20
Raoul Paoli	Heavyweight	Olin (FIN); L	Viljaama (FIN); L	did not advance				N/A	did not advance			12
