= Russian Empire at the 1912 Summer Olympics =

- Flag of the Russian Empire
- IOC code: RU1
- NOC: Russian Olympic Committee

in Stockholm
- Competitors: 159 in 15 sports
- Medals Ranked 16th: Gold 0 Silver 2 Bronze 3 Total 5

Summer Olympics appearances (overview)
- 1900; 1904; 1908; 1912

Other related appearances
- Soviet Union (1952–1988); Unified Team (1992); Russia (1994–2016); ROC (2020); Individual Neutral Athletes (2024)

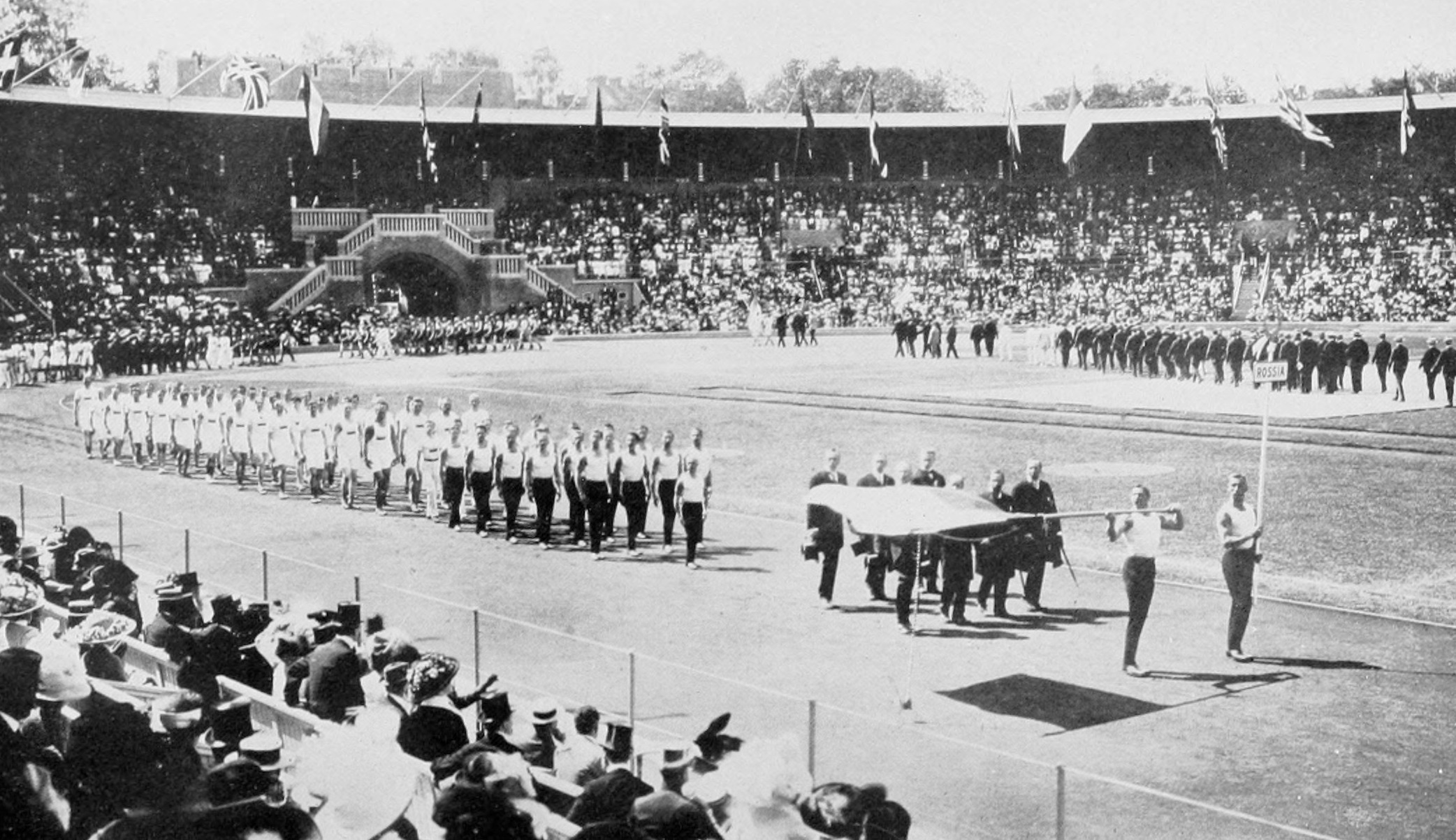
The team of Russia at the opening ceremony.

The Russian Empire (Russia) competed at the 1912 Summer Olympics in Stockholm, Sweden. 159 competitors took part in 62 events in 15 sports.

== Medalists ==
=== Silver ===
- Amos Kash, Nikolai Melnitsky, Pavel Voyloshnikov and Grigori Panteleimonov — Shooting, Men's Team 30m rapid fire pistol
- Martin Klein — Wrestling, Greco-Roman middleweight

=== Bronze ===
- Mart Kuusik — Rowing, Men's single sculls
- Esper Beloselsky, Ernest Brasche, Nikolai Puschnitsky, Aleksandr Rodionov, Joseph Schomacker, Philipp Strauch and Karl Lindholm — Sailing, Men's 10m class
- Haralds Blaus — Shooting, Men's Trap

== Aquatics ==
=== Swimming ===
Four swimmers competed for Russia at the 1912 Games. It was the nation's debut in swimming. None of the Russian swimmers took part in the semifinals of any event; Baimakov had advanced unopposed from the quarterfinals in the 400 metre breaststroke, but did not start in the semifinals.

Ranks given for each swimmer are within the heat.

Men

Swimmer	Events	Heat		Quarterfinal		Semifinal		Final	
Swimmer	Events	Result	Rank	Result	Rank	Result	Rank	Result	Rank
Pavel Avksentyev	400 m freestyle	N/A		Did not finish		Did not advance			
Pavel Avksentyev	1500 m freestyle	N/A		Did not finish		Did not advance			
Georgy Baimakov	200 m breaststroke	N/A		3:29.0	5	Did not advance			
Georgy Baimakov	400 m breaststroke	N/A		7:28.6	2 Q	Did not start		Did not advance	
Herbert von Kuhlberg	100 m freestyle	Unknown	4	Did not advance					
Nikolai Voronkov	400 m freestyle	N/A		Did not finish		Did not advance			

== Athletics ==
35 athletes competed for Russia. It was the second appearance of the nation in athletics, after having a single marathon runner in 1908. Aleksandr Schultz's 11th-place finish in the decathlon was Russia's best placement.

Ranks given are within that athlete's heat for running events.

Athlete	Events	Heat		Semifinal		Final	
Athlete	Events	Result	Rank	Result	Rank	Result	Rank
Aleksis Aide	10 km walk	N/A		59:24.4	9	Did not advance	
Alfreds Alslebens	Decathlon	N/A				5294.615	12
Ulrich Baasch	Pole vault	N/A		3.40	16	Did not advance	
Herberts Baumanis	200 m	Did not finish		Did not advance			
Pyotr Gayevsky	400 m	?	4	Did not advance			
Haralds Hahne	200 m	?	4	Did not advance			
Arnolds Indriksons	1500 m	N/A		?	6	Did not advance	
Andrejs Kapmals	Marathon	N/A				Did not finish	
Nikolay Khorkov	1500 m	N/A		?	7	Did not advance	
Nikolay Khorkov	Marathon	N/A				Did not start	
Alexandre Kracheninin	Marathon	N/A				Did not start	
Andrejs Krūkliņš	1500 m	N/A		?	5-6	Did not advance	
Andrejs Krūkliņš	Marathon	N/A				Did not finish	
Leopolds Lēvenšteins	100 m	?	6	Did not advance			
Kaarel Lukk	10 km walk	N/A		Did not finish		Did not advance	
Eduard Hermann	10 km walk	N/A		Disqualified		Did not advance	
Johann Martin	Pole vault	N/A		1.70	25	Did not advance	
Vasily Molokanov	2 hand discus	N/A		47.37	19	Did not advance	
Dmitry Nazarov	800 m	?	5	Did not advance			
Dmitry Nazarov	1500 m	N/A		Did not finish		Did not advance	
Nikolai Neklapayev	Discus throw	N/A		32.59	35	Did not advance	
Nikolai Neklapayev	Javelin throw	N/A		44.98	17	Did not advance	
Mikhail Nikolsky	5000 m	N/A		17:21.7	4	Did not advance	
Mikhail Nikolsky	10000 m	N/A		Did not finish		Did not advance	
Mikhail Nikolsky	Marathon	N/A				Did not start	
Arvīds Ozols-Berne	Shot put	N/A		10.33	21	Did not advance	
Yevgeni Petrov	1500 m	N/A		?	5	Did not advance	
Nikolajs Rasso	Marathon	N/A				Did not finish	
Elmar Reiman	Marathon	N/A				?	35
Alfrēds Ruks	1500 m	N/A		?	7	Did not advance	
Alfred Schwarz	Standing high jump	N/A		1.40	13	Did not advance	
Richard Schwarz	100 m	?	5	Did not advance			
Aleksandr Schultz	Long jump	N/A		6.15	22	Did not advance	
Aleksandr Schultz	Decathlon	N/A				6134.470	11
Pavel Shtiglits	100 m	?	4	Did not advance			
Nikolajs Švedrēvics	Javelin throw	N/A		43.21	20	Did not advance	
Aleksandrs Upmals	Marathon	N/A				Did not finish	
Ēriks Vanags	Shot put	N/A		10.44	20	Did not advance	
Ēriks Vanags	Discus throw	N/A		31.34	39	Did not advance	
Johannes Leopold Villemson	800 m	Did not finish		Did not advance			
Rūdolfs Vītols	1500 m	N/A		?	4-5	Did not advance	
René Wilde	Marathon	N/A				Did not start	
Aleksandr Elizarov	800 m	?	5-7	Did not advance			
Aleksandr Elizarov	1500 m	N/A		?	6	Did not advance	
Joseph Zaitsev	Marathon	N/A				Did not start	

== Cycling ==
Ten cyclists represented Russia. It was the first appearance of the nation in cycling. Andrejs Apsītis was the only cyclist to finish the time trial, the only race held, placing 60th. Because only Apsītis finished the time trial, the team received no ranking in the four-man team competition.

=== Road cycling ===
Cyclist	Events	Final	
Cyclist	Events	Result	Rank
Andrejs Apsītis	Ind. time trial	12:18:20.6	60
Fiodor Borisow	Ind. time trial	Did not finish	
Fridrihs Bošs	Ind. time trial	Did not finish	
Jēkabs Bukse	Ind. time trial	Did not finish	
Augusts Kepke	Ind. time trial	Did not finish	
Kārlis Kepke	Ind. time trial	Did not finish	
Jānis Līvens	Ind. time trial	Did not finish	
Sergey Pesteryev	Ind. time trial	Did not finish	
Jānis Prātnieks	Ind. time trial	Did not finish	
Edgars Rihters	Ind. time trial	Did not finish	
Andrejs Apsītis; No other finishers	Team time trial	Did not finish	

== Diving ==
A single diver represented Russia. It was Russia's debut in diving. Viktor Baranov, the sole Russian diver, did not finish the competition in the first round of the plain high diving event.

Rankings given are within the diver's heat.

Diver	Events	Heats		Final	
Diver	Events	Result	Rank	Result	Rank
Viktor Baranov	Plain high diving	Did not finish		Did not advance	

== Equestrian ==
Dressage

Rider	Horse	Event	Final	
Rider	Horse	Event	Penalties	Rank
Mikhail Yekimov	Tritonych	Individual	62	9

Jumping

(Team score is the sum of the top three individual scores.)

Rider	Horse	Event	Final	
Rider	Horse	Event	Penalties	Rank
Dmitri Pavlovich	Unité	Individual	10	9
Mikhail Plechkov	Yvette	Individual	17	21
Aleksandr Rodzyanko	Eros	Individual	14	16
Karol Rómmel	Siablik	Individual	12	15
Sergey Zagorsky	Bandoura	Individual	16	18
Aleksey Selikhov	Tugela	Individual	20	22
Mikhail Plechkov; Aleksandr Rodzyanko; Aleksey Selikhov; Dmitri Pavlovich	Yvette; Eros; Tugela; Unité	Team	50	5

== Fencing ==
Twenty-four fencers represented Russia. It was the second appearance of the nation in fencing, which had previously competed in 1900. Because both fencers in 1900 had been professionals, the 1912 team was the first Russian team to feature amateurs. None of the Russian fencers in 1912 advanced to the finals, though four sabrists reached the semifinals.

Fencer	Event	Round 1		Quarterfinal		Semifinal		Final	
Fencer	Event	Record	Rank	Record	Rank	Record	Rank	Record	Rank
Vladimir Andreyev	Sabre	2 wins	3 Q	2 losses	3 Q	Did not start		Did not advance	
Boris Arsenyev	Sabre	Bye		2 losses	3 Q	1 win	5	Did not advance	
Gavriil Bertrain	Foil	2 losses	4	Did not advance					
Gavriil Bertrain	Épée	1 loss	2 Q	4 losses	5	Did not advance			
Vladimir Danich	Sabre	1 win	3 Q	Did not start		Did not advance			
Pavel Filatov	Sabre	1 win	4	Did not advance					
Nikolay Goredetsky	Foil	6 losses	7	Did not advance					
Leonid Grinev	Foil	4 losses	5	Did not advance					
Apollon Guiber von Greifenfels	Sabre	Bye		2 losses	2 Q	2 wins	4	Did not advance	
Pavel Guvorsky	Foil	4 losses	5	Did not advance					
Pavel Guvorsky	Épée	6 losses	7	Did not advance					
Anatoly Zhakovlev	Foil	4 losses	5	Did not advance					
Vladimir Keyser	Foil	5 losses	7	Did not advance					
Vladimir Keyser	Épée	4 losses	4	Did not advance					
Dmitry Knyazhevich	Foil	3 losses	4	Did not advance					
Nikolay Kuznetsov	Sabre	Bye		3 losses	4	Did not advance			
Feliks Leparsky	Foil	3 losses	4	Did not advance					
Lev Martyushev	Foil	3 losses	4	Did not advance					
Lev Martyushev	Épée	4 losses	5	Did not advance					
Aleksandr Mordovin	Foil	3 losses	4	Did not advance					
Aleksandr Mordovin	Sabre	1 win	4	Did not advance					
Boris Nepokupnoy	Sabre	0 wins	4	Did not advance					
Georgy Zakyrich	Sabre	1 win	4	Did not advance					
Vladimir Samoylov	Foil	4 losses	5	Did not advance					
Vladimir de Sarnavsky	Foil	4 losses	5	Did not advance					
Vladimir de Sarnavsky	Épée	4 losses	4	Did not advance					
Aleksandr Shkylev	Sabre	1 win	4	Did not advance					
Aleksandr Soldatenkov	Épée	4 losses	5	Did not advance					
Anatoly Timofeyev	Sabre	1 win	3 Q	2 losses	3 Q	Did not start		Did not advance	
Konstantin Vaterkampf	Sabre	1 win	4	Did not advance					
Gavril Bertrain; Pavel Guvorsky; Vladimir Keyser; Dmitry Knyazhevich; Lev Martyushev; Vladimir Sarnavsky; Aleksandr Soldatenkov	Team épée	N/A		0–2	3	Did not advance			
Vladimir Andreyev; Vladimir Danich; Apollon Guiber von Greifenfels; Nikolay Kuznetsov; Aleksandr Mordovin; Georgy Zakyrich; Aleksandr Shkylev; Anatoly Timofeyev	Team sabre	N/A		0–2	3	Did not advance			

== Football ==
Quarterfinals

1912-06-30

Finland	2 – 1	Russian Empire
Wiberg 30'; Öhman 80'		Butusov 72'

Traneberg Stadium, Stockholm
Attendance: 300

Consolation quarterfinals

1912-07-01

Germany	16 – 0	Russian Empire
Fuchs 2' 9' 21' 28' 34' 46' 51' 55' 65' 69'; Förderer 6' 27' 53' 66'; Burger 30'; Oberle 58'

Råsunda Stadium, Stockholm
Attendance: 2,000

Final rank
9th place

== Gymnastics ==
Four gymnasts represented Russia. It was the debut of the nation in gymnastics. All four of the Russian gymnasts finished in the bottom five. Russia did not send any teams in the team competitions.

=== Artistic ===
Gymnast	Events	Final	
Gymnast	Events	Result	Rank
Aleksandr Akhun	All-around	87.75	39
Semyon Kulikov	All-around	79.50	41
Pavel Kushnikov	All-around	90.00	38
Fyodor Zabelin	All-around	76.25	42

== Modern pentathlon ==
Russia had five competitors in the first Olympic pentathlon competition. Two of the Russians were among the ten pentathletes to retire early. The others placed 15th, 20th, and 21st among the 22 finishers.

(The scoring system was point-for-place in each of the five events, with the smallest point total winning.)

Athlete	Shooting		Swimming		Fencing			Riding			Running		Total points	Rank
Athlete	Score	Points	Time	Points	Wins	Touches	Points	Penalties	Time	Points	Time	Points	Total points	Rank
Carl Aejemelaeus	151	19	8:59.8	25	Did not start			Retired					Did not finish	
Aarno Almqvist	143	24	6:06.0	11	3	?	27	0	12:03.4	13	23:16.1	16	90	20
Weli Hohenthal	159	17	7:38.8	19	5	7	25	2	11:11.8	16	23:28.6	17	94	21
Boris Nepokupnoy	185	6	8:16.6	24	Did not start			Retired					Did not finish	
Oskar Wilkman	176	11	8:11.6	23	7	7	20	0	10:34.2	5	22:57.8	15	73	15

== Rowing ==
One rower represented Russia. It was the nation's first appearance in rowing. Kuusik advanced to the semifinals in the single sculls before being defeated, taking the bronze medal.

(Ranks given are within each crew's heat.)

Rower	Event	Heats		Quarterfinals		Semifinals		Final	
Rower	Event	Result	Rank	Result	Rank	Result	Rank	Result	Rank
Mart Kuusik	Single sculls	7:45.2	1 Q	7:45.0	1 Q	Unknown	2	Did not advance ( (bronze) )	

== Sailing ==
Seventeen sailors represented Russia. It was the nation's first appearance in sailing. Neither of Russia's eight metre boats were able to score any points, but the nation's ten metre boat finished in the top three of both races; that boat lost the race-off for second place and settled for the bronze medal.

(7 points for 1st in each race, 3 points for 2nd, 1 point for 3rd. Race-off to break ties in total points if necessary for medal standings.)

Sailors	Event	Race 1			Race 2			Total		
Sailors	Event	Time	Points	Rank	Time	Points	Rank	Points	Race-off	Rank
Johan Farber; Vladimir Ilyevich; Vladimir Lurasov; Nikolay Podgornov; Herman von Adlerberg	8 metre class	2:27:59	0	7	2:21:43	0	7	0	N/A	5
Yevgeny Kuhn; Ventseslav Kuzmichev; Yevgeny Lomach; Viktor Markov; Pavel Pavlov	8 metre class	2:18:52	0	4	2:16:15	0	5	0	N/A	5
Esper Beloselsky; Ernest Brasche; Karl Lindblom; Nikolay Pushnitsky; Aleksandr Rodionov; Iosif Shomaker; Philipp Strauch	10 metre class	3:59:20	1	3	3:45:38	3	2	4	4:23:17	3rd place, bronze medalist(s)

== Shooting ==
Twenty six shooters competed for Russia. It was the first appearance of the nation in shooting. The Russian shooters won a pair of medals—a silver in the team rapid fire pistol and Blau's bronze in the trap—in their debut performance in the sport.

Shooter	Event	Final	
Shooter	Event	Result	Rank
Dmitri Barkov	100 m deer, single shots	23	31
Dmitri Barkov	100 m deer, double shots	39	19
Boris Belinsky	300 m rifle, 3 pos.	746	65
Boris Belinsky	600 m free rifle	69	65
Boris Belinsky	300 m military rifle, 3 pos.	78	46
Harry Blau	100 m deer, single shots	29	20
Harry Blau	Trap	91	3rd place, bronze medalist(s)
Valter Bodneck	Trap	36	35
Georgy de Davydov	300 m free rifle, 3 pos.	635	76
Georgy de Davydov	600 m free rifle	70	61
Georgy de Davydov	300 m military rifle, 3 pos.	68	68
Aleksandr Dobrzhansky	50 m rifle, prone	172	33
Aleksandr Dobrzhansky	300 m free rifle, 3 pos.	463	78
Aleksandr Dobrzhansky	600 m free rifle	61	71
Aleksandr Dobrzhansky	300 m military rifle, 3 pos.	66	71
Aleksandr Dobrzhansky	25 m small-bore rifle	190	26
Aleksandr Dobrzhansky	100 m deer, single shots	22	33
Konstantin Kalinin	300 m free rifle, 3 pos.	736	68
Konstantin Kalinin	600 m free rifle	77	39
Konstantin Kalinin	300 m military rifle, 3 pos.	62	79
Amos Kash	50 m pistol	384	46
Amos Kash	30 m rapid fire pistol	260	28
Dmitry Kuskov	300 m free rifle, 3 pos.	780	58
Dmitry Kuskov	600 m free rifle	71	59
Dmitry Kuskov	300 m military rifle, 3 pos.	77	49
Dmitry Kuskov	50 m pistol	438	19
Feofan Lebedev	300 m free rifle, 3 pos.	806	54
Feofan Lebedev	600 m free rifle	59	74
Feofan Lebedev	300 m military rifle, 3 pos.	80	42
Pavel Lesh	300 m free rifle, 3 pos.	713	71
Pavel Lesh	600 m free rifle	62	70
Pavel Lesh	300 m military rifle, 3 pos.	83	30
Pavel Leith	100 m deer, single shots	10	34
Pavel Leith	Trap	12	51
Nikolai Melnitsky	50 m pistol	414	33
Nikolai Melnitsky	30 m rapid fire pistol	264	22
Nikolai Panin-Kolomenkin	50 m pistol	457	8
Grigori Panteleimonov	50 m pistol	442	17
Grigori Panteleimonov	30 m rapid fire pistol	265	14
Boris Pertel	Trap	11	53
Vladimir Potekin	50 m rifle, prone	170	36
Vladimir Potekin	25 m small-bore rifle	171	32
Osvald Rechke	300 m free rifle, 3 pos.	699	73
Osvald Rechke	600 m free rifle	71	58
Osvald Rechke	300 m military rifle, 3 pos.	78	47
Grigori Shesterikov	50 m pistol	420	31
Grigori Shesterikov	30 m rapid fire pistol	250	32
Vasily Skrotsky	100 m deer, single shots	31	15
Vasily Skrotsky	100 m deer, double shots	32	20
Leonardus Syttin	Trap	81	23
Aleksandr Tillo	300 m free rifle, 3 pos.	744	66
Aleksandr Tillo	600 m free rifle	70	62
Aleksandr Tillo	300 m military rifle, 3 pos.	76	51
Pavel Valden	300 m free rifle, 3 pos.	758	62
Pavel Valden	600 m free rifle	75	45
Pavel Valden	300 m military rifle, 3 pos.	89	11
Georgi Vishnyakov	600 m free rifle	56	77
Georgi Vishnyakov	300 m military rifle, 3 pos.	84	26
Pavel Voyloshnikov	50 m pistol	413	34
Pavel Voyloshnikov	30 m rapid fire pistol	260	24
Dāvids Veiss	300 m free rifle, 3 pos.	623	77
Dāvids Veiss	600 m free rifle	73	51
Dāvids Veiss	300 m military rifle, 3 pos.	72	60
Dmitri Barkov; Harry Blau; Aleksandr Dobryansky; Vasily Skrotsky	100 m team deer, single shots	108	5
Amos Kash; Nikolai Melnitsky; Grigori Panteleimonov; Pavel Voyloshnikov	30 metre team rapid fire pistol	1091	2nd place, silver medalist(s)
Nikolai Melnitsky; Nikolai Panin-Kolomenkin; Grigori Shesterikov; Pavel Voyloshnikov	50 m team pistol	1801	4
Georgi Davydov; Dmitry Kuskov; Feofan Lebedev; Aleksandr Tillo; Pavel Valden; Davids Weiss	Team rifle	1403	9
Feofan Lebedev; Pavel Lesh; Konstantin Kalinin; Dmitry Kuskov; Aleksandr Tillo; Pavel Valden	Team free rifle	4892	7

== Tennis ==
Two tennis players represented Russia at the 1912 Games. It was the nation's debut in tennis.

Men

Athlete	Event	Round of 128	Round of 64	Round of 32	Round of 16	Quarterfinals	Semifinals	Final	
Athlete	Event	Opposition Score	Opposition Score	Opposition Score	Opposition Score	Opposition Score	Opposition Score	Opposition Score	Rank
Mikhaił Sumarakow-Elston	Outdoor singles	Bye	Bye	Setterwall (SWE); W 6-2, 6-3, 11-13, 6-2	Kreuzer (GER); L 6-2, 10-12, 6-4, 6-0	Did not advance			9
Aleksandr Alejnicyn; Mikhaił Sumarakow-Elston	Outdoor doubles	N/A		Bye	Hansen & Rovsing (DEN); W 2-6, 6-3, 7-5, 6-3	Canet & Mény (FRA); L 6-3, 6-0, 6-1	Did not advance		5

== Wrestling ==
=== Greco-Roman ===
Russia was represented by 11 wrestlers at its second Olympic wrestling appearance. Klein was able to match Russia's best performance from 1908, taking the silver medal in the middleweight class. The team went a combined 17–22.

The bout between Klein and Asikainen turned out to be the last match, which lasted 11 hours and forty minutes, which is the world's longest wrestling match.

After Klein finally claimed victory, he was completely exhausted and was ruled unfit to compete in the final. Thus Johanson, whose only loss in the elimination rounds had been via a double loss to Asikainen, became the gold medalist.

Wrestler	Class	First round	Second round	Third round	Fourth round	Fifth round	Sixth round	Seventh round	Final			
Wrestler	Class	Opposition Result	Opposition Result	Opposition Result	Opposition Result	Opposition Result	Opposition Result	Opposition Result	Match A Opposition Result	Match B Opposition Result	Match C Opposition Result	Rank
Aleksandr Ankondinow	Featherweight	Kangas (FIN); L	Stein (GER); W	Larsson (SWE); L	Did not advance							19
Georg Baumann	Lightweight	Väre (FIN); L	Salonen (FIN); L	Did not advance								31
Nikolajs Farnest	Heavyweight	Neser (GER); L	Barrett (GBR); L	Did not advance				N/A	Did not advance			12
Oskar Kaplur	Lightweight	Hayes (GBR); W	Covre (ITA); W	Salonen (FIN); W	Väre (FIN); L	Tanttu (FIN); W	Kolehmainen (FIN); L	Did not advance				6
August Kippasto	Lightweight	Radvány (HUN); L	Halík (BOH); L	Did not advance								31
Martin Klein	Middleweight	Somogyi (HUN); W	Bergqvist (SWE); W	Miskey (HUN); W	Merkle (GER); W	Westerlund (FIN); L	Åberg (FIN); W	Jokinen (FIN); W	Asikainen (FIN); W	Bye	Johansson (SWE); L/WO	2nd place, silver medalist(s)
Aleksanders Meesits	Featherweight	MacKenzie (GBR); L	Hetmar (DEN); L	Did not advance								26
Paweł Pawłowicz	Featherweight	Karlsson (SWE); W	Arneson (NOR); W	Beránek (BOH); L	Öberg (SWE); L	Did not advance						12
Augusts Pikker	Light heavyweight	Barl (AUT); W	Andersson (SWE); L	Did not start	Did not advance			N/A	Did not advance			19
Jānis Polis	Middleweight	Bacon (GBR); W	Jokinen (FIN); L	Kokotowitsch (AUT); L	Did not advance							20
Aleksandr Severov	Middleweight	Frank (SWE); L	Dahlberg (SWE); W	Johansson (SWE); L	Did not advance							20
