= Kepke =

Kepke is a Latvian surname. Notable people with the surname include:

- Augusts Kepke (1886–?), Russian cyclist
- Kārlis Kepke (1890–?), Russian cyclist
