= Rudolph Lewis =

Rudolph Lewis may refer to:

- Rudolph Lewis (bass-baritone) (1844–1917), Gilbert and Sullivan bass-baritone
- Rudolph Lewis (cyclist) (1887–1933), South African road racing cyclist
