= Andrejs Kapmals =

Latvian distance runner

Personal information
- Nationality: Latvian
- Born: 5 November 1889 Riga, Russian Empire
- Died: 21 January 1994 (aged 104)

Sport
- Sport: Long-distance running
- Event: Marathon

Andrejs Kapmals (5 November 1889 – 21 January 1994) was a Latvian athlete who competed for the Russian Empire at the 1912 Summer Olympics in Stockholm, where he was one of numerous participants who failed to complete the men's marathon. He was born in Riga and competed out of Rīgas Marss.
