= Michael Walker (cyclist) =

Irish cyclist (1885–1971)

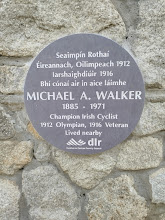
- Commemorative plaque in Dundrum, Dublin

Personal information
- Born: 13 August 1885 Dublin, Ireland
- Died: 17 March 1971 (aged 85) Dublin, Ireland

Cycling career
- Sport: Cycling

Michael Andrew Walker (13 August 1885 – 17 March 1971) was an Irish cyclist. He represented Ireland in two events at the 1912 Summer Olympics. (Ireland and Scotland entered separate national teams; France made a formal objection to this the day before the race, but the objection failed. The Irish team included Michael Walker, his brother John, also a long-distance cyclist; Francis Guy, 'Arjay' Mecredy; Matthew Walsh and Bernard Doyle.) The Irish Times, describing the race, wrote: "M Walker came over [fell] twice during the event and he had the mistortune to be compelled to ride for the greater part of the journey on a leaking tyre. BJ Doyle, who was generally regarded as the rider most likely to improve on his form at the trial race, had the misfortune to be fouled by the crack [the champion] of the Swedish team, and fell He punctured twice, and lost his way and fell twice again before he finished. F Guy of Belfast rode excellently, and despite three falls of a puncture, he finished within five minutes of Walker, who was the fastest of the Irishmen." The team rode on Lucania bicycles, made in John O'Neill's bicycle factory in Pleasants Street, Dublin. Walker was Irish champion at 50 miles in 1913 and set national records at both 12 and 24 hours.

In civil life Michael Walker was a compositor. With his brother John Walker, also an Olympic cyclist, he fought in the 1916 Rising for Irish independence. He was a member of the Irish Volunteers, G Company, 2nd Battalion, Jacob's Garrison, under the command of Thomas MacDonagh. He was subsequently imprisoned in H.M.P. Stafford, but later returned to Ireland to fight in the War of Independence.
