= George Watson (cyclist) =

Canadian cyclist

Personal information
- Born: February 26, 1890 Sorrento, British Columbia, Canada
- Died: June 28, 1938 (aged 48)

Cycling career
- Sport: Cycling

George Watson (February 26, 1890 – June 28, 1938) was a Canadian cyclist. He competed in the individual time trial at the 1912 Summer Olympics.
