= Wilhelm Rabe =

German cyclist

Personal information
- Born: 16 May 1876 Magdeburg, German Empire
- Died: 9 December 1958 (aged 82) Hamburg, West Germany

Cycling career
- Sport: Cycling

Wilhelm Rabe (16 May 1876 – 9 December 1958) was a German cyclist. He competed in two events at the 1912 Summer Olympics.
