= Gunnar Björk =

Swedish cyclist

Personal information
- Born: 21 January 1891 Stockholm, Sweden
- Died: 14 February 1980 (aged 89) Stockholm, Sweden

Cycling career
- Sport: Cycling

Gunnar Björk (21 January 1891 – 14 February 1980) was a Swedish cyclist. He competed in two events at the 1912 Summer Olympics.

He garnered 51st place in the individual road race, and his team received the gold in the team road race.
