= Rudolph Lewis (cyclist) =

South African cyclist (1887–1933)

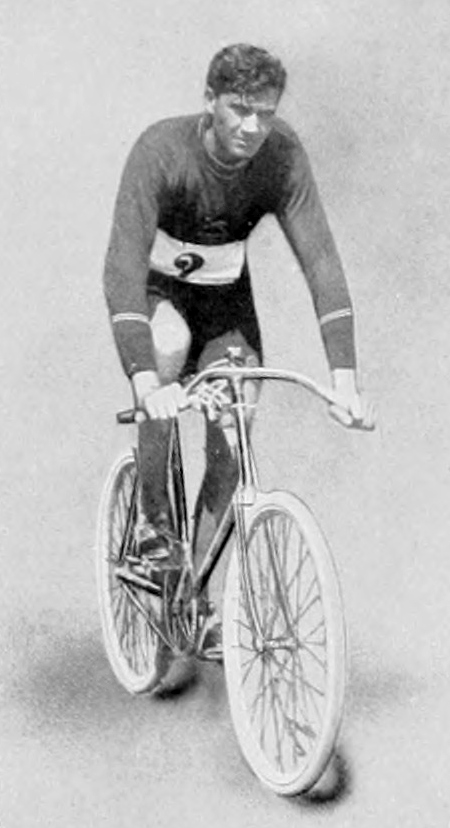
- Rudolph Lewis at the 1912 Olympics

Personal information
- Full name: Rudolph Ludewyk Lewis
- Nickname: "Okey"
- Born: 12 July 1887 Pretoria, South African Republic
- Died: 29 October 1933 (aged 46) Pretoria, South Africa

Cycling career
- Sport: Cycling
- Discipline: Road cycling
Medal record
Representing South Africa
Olympic Games
Gold medal – first place	1912 Stockholm	time trial

Rudolph Ludewyk "Okey" Lewis (12 July 1887 – 29 October 1933) was a South African road racing cyclist who won the gold medal in the time trial at the 1912 Summer Olympics.

Lewis was born on a farm near Pretoria and grew up in Germiston. He worked full-time underground at a gold mine and, in his spare time, trained in cycling, boxing and skating. After the 1912 Olympics, he raced professionally in Germany in 1913–14 and won the classic race Rund um Dresden in 1914. During World War I, he served in the German Army and was awarded the Iron Cross. His health deteriorated as a result of war injuries and time spent in a prison camp, which resulted in his early death at age 46.

== Major results ==
1912
Summer Olympics Time Trial – gold medal
1913
Rund um Dresden, – 2nd place
1914
Rund um Dresden – 1st place
Großer Sachsenpreis – 2nd place
