= Tim Kellaway =

British long-distance runner (1891–1952)

Personal information
- Nationality: British
- Born: 7 October 1891 Marylebone, London, England
- Died: 31 December 1952 (aged 61) Chelsea, London, England

Sport
- Sport: Long-distance running
- Event: Marathon

Tim Kellaway (7 October 1891 – 31 December 1952) was a British long-distance runner. He competed in the marathon at the 1912 Summer Olympics.
