= Hjalmar Levin =

Swedish cyclist (1884–1983)

Personal information
- Born: 14 June 1884 Eskilstuna, Sweden
- Died: 8 March 1983 (aged 98) Eskilstuna, Sweden

Cycling career
- Sport: Cycling

Hjalmar Levin (14 June 1884 – 8 March 1983) was a Swedish cyclist. He competed in two events at the 1912 Summer Olympics.
