= Aleksandrs Upmals =

Latvian long-distance runner (1892–1945)

Personal information
- Nationality: Latvian
- Born: 1 September 1892 Riga, Russian Empire
- Died: 1918 (aged 25–26) Petrograd, USSR

Sport
- Sport: Long-distance running
- Event: Marathon

Pēteris Aleksandrs Upmals (1 September 1892 – 1918) was a Latvian long-distance runner. He competed for the Russian Empire in the marathon at the 1912 Summer Olympics.
