= Robert Birker =

German cyclist

Personal information
- Born: 21 February 1885 Wermelskirchen, German Empire
- Died: 2 August 1942 (aged 57) Duisburg, Germany

Cycling career
- Sport: Cycling

Robert Birker (21 February 1885 – 2 August 1942) was a German cyclist. He competed in two events at the 1912 Summer Olympics.
