= Jesse Pike =

American cyclist

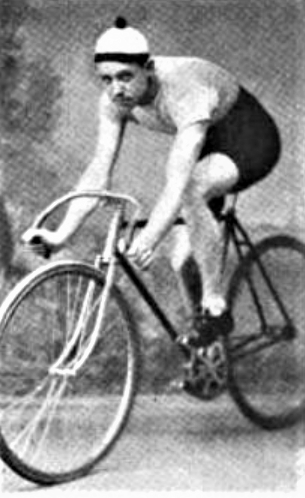

Personal information
- Full name: Jesse Reynolds Pike
- Born: September 17, 1890 North Bergen, New Jersey, United States
- Died: October 22, 1986 (aged 96) Point Pleasant Beach, New Jersey, United States

Cycling career
- Sport: Cycling

Jesse Reynolds Pike (September 17, 1890 – October 22, 1986) was an American cyclist. He competed in two events at the 1912 Summer Olympics.
