= Karl Gulbrandsen =

Norwegian cyclist

Personal information
- Born: 22 May 1892 Oslo, Norway
- Died: 28 August 1973 (aged 81) Oslo, Norway

Cycling career
- Sport: Cycling

Karl Gulbrandsen (22 May 1892 – 28 August 1973) was a Norwegian cyclist. He competed in two events at the 1912 Summer Olympics.
