= Gyula Mazur =

Hungarian cyclist

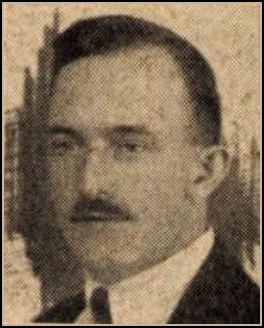

Personal information
- Born: 4 April 1888 Budapest, Austria-Hungary
- Died: 26 November 1953 (aged 65) Budapest, Hungary

Cycling career
- Sport: Cycling

Gyula Mazur (4 April 1888 – 26 November 1953) was a Hungarian cyclist. He competed in two events at the 1912 Summer Olympics.
