= Carl Lüthje =

German cyclist

Personal information
- Born: 22 January 1883 Zarpen, German Empire
- Died: 11 January 1969 (aged 85) Hamburg, West Germany

Cycling career
- Sport: Cycling

Carl Lüthje (22 January 1883 – 11 January 1969) was a German cyclist. He competed in two events at the 1912 Summer Olympics.
