= Richard J. Mecredy =

Irish racing cyclist and writer (1861–1924)

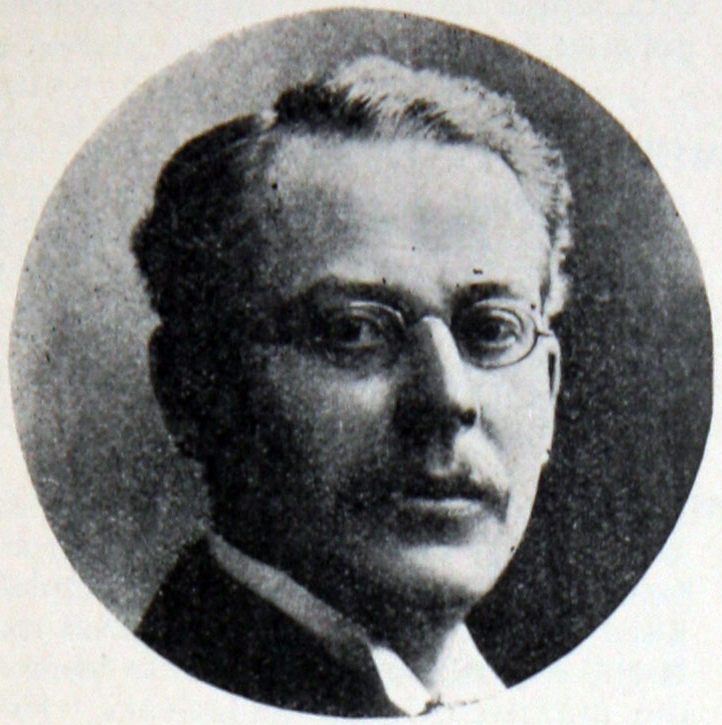
- Mecredy in 1904

Personal information
- Born: May 18, 1861 Ballinasloe, County Galway, Ireland
- Died: April 26, 1924 (aged 62) Dumfries, Scotland

Cycling career
- Sport: Cycling
- Discipline: Road racer
- Role: Rider
- Rider type: All-rounder

Major wins
- National Cyclists' Union meeting, London, 1890

Richard James Patrick Mecredy (1861–1924) was an Irish bicycle racer, journalist and writer. He is credited as being the inventor of Cycle polo, the rules of which he drew up in 1891.

== Life ==
Mecredy was born in Ballinasloe, County Galway, the son of Rev. James Mecredy, the Church of Ireland rector of Inveran, Spiddal, County Galway. He was educated at Portora Royal School, Enniskillen. He graduated from Trinity College Dublin (where he had been an Irish champion tricycle racer) in 1884 and after a short spell as a teacher was apprenticed as a solicitor with his uncle, Thomas Tighe Mecredy, of Dublin. However, his interest in cycling and his growing reputation as a cycle racer led to his becoming Dublin correspondent of the Tralee publisher J. G. Hodgins's Irish Cyclist and Athlete in September 1885. Hodgins appointed him editor in November the same year. Mecredy bought the paper from Hodgins with his brother Alexander in 1886 and moved its office to Dublin. William Percy French contributed regularly to the magazine from 1886 until French's death in 1920. Meready also set up The Jarvey weekly comic paper in January 1889 with William Percy French as its editor.

In the 1886 Irish National Cycling Championships in Track Racing he won the 1 mile, 2-mile and 4-mile events. In the 1880s and 1890s he won a total of nine Irish championships.

He had his greatest success at the National Cyclists' Union meeting in London in 1890. He had already given up competitive cycling when Dunlop introduced the pneumatic tyre in 1888, and he saw the benefit that this would bring to cycling, so he agreed to accompany the Irish team of the brothers du Cros, F. F. McCabe and P. Piggott to London. It was a daring decision for him to compete, but it was justified by his winning all four championships and finishing the season with an unbeaten record.

Mecredy was a founder member of the Irish Roads Improvement Association and was responsible for the dissemination of a body of literature on road improvement, maps and guides. His Art and Pastime of Cycling became a standard guide for the cyclist.

As the editor of the Dublin Motor News, Mecredy was involved in helping to organise the 1903 Gordon Bennett Cup, the first international motor race to be held in Ireland (an honorific to Selwyn Edge who had won the 1902 event in the Paris-Vienna race driving a Napier). The Automobile Club of Great Britain and Ireland wanted the race to be hosted in the British Isles, and their secretary, Claude Johnson, suggested Ireland as the venue. Mecredy suggested an area in County Kildare, and letters were sent to 102 Irish MPs, 90 Irish peers, 300 newspapers, 34 chairmen of county and local councils, 34 County secretaries, 26 mayors, 41 railway companies, 460 hoteliers, 13 PPs, plus the Bishop of Kildare and Leighlin, Patrick Foley, who pronounced himself in favour. Local laws had to be adjusted, ergo the 'Light Locomotives (Ireland) Bill' was passed on 27 March 1903, and Kildare was chosen. The 328 miles (528 km) race was won by the famous Belgian Camille Jenatzy.James Joyce used the 1903 race as the setting for his short story “After the Race”, in his collection Dubliners.

In early October 1912 Carl Stearns Clancy, along with his biking partner, Walter Rendell Storey, arrived in Dublin to commence his circumnavigation of the world by motor-cycle. Mecredy gave them road maps and helped them plot their route in Ireland. Clancy continued his circumnavigation of the globe until August 1913, during which he rode 18,000 miles in Europe, Africa, Asia and North America.

Mecredy was a vegetarian and authored a book Health's Highway.

He died while in a sanatorium in Dumfries, Scotland, after a long illness - he suffered from tuberculosis. He is buried in Dumfries, Scotland.

== Family ==
He married Catherine Anne Hopkins, from Oldcastle, County Meath, in 1887. They had six children: Raymond, Ralph, Eric, Myrtle, Ivy and May.

His son, Dr. Ralph Mecredy, was also a cyclist and competed in the 1912 Summer Olympics in Stockholm. He survived the sinking of the RMS Lusitania in 1915.

== Publications ==
- The Art and Pastime of Cycling. By R. J. Mecredy and G. Stoney. 1895
- Mecredy's Road Book of Ireland
- The Motor Book
- Cyclist & pedestrian guide to the neighbourhood of Dublin. 1891
- De Dion Bouton Motor Carriages, Their Mechanism and how to Drive Them. 1910
- Health's Highway. 1910
- The Irish Cyclist from 1886
- The Jarvey 1889-1891
