= Károly Teppert =

Hungarian cyclist

Personal information
- Born: 20 July 1891 Budapest, Hungary

Cycling career
- Sport: Cycling

Károly Teppert (born 20 July 1891, date of death unknown) was a Hungarian cyclist. He competed in two events at the 1912 Summer Olympics.
