= Athanase Sartori =

French sports shooter

Personal information
- Born: 10 May 1852 Varese, Austrian Empire
- Died: 9 October 1920 (aged 68)

Sport
- Sport: Sports shooting

Athanase Sartori (10 May 1852 – 9 October 1920) was a French sports shooter. He competed in three events at the 1912 Summer Olympics.
