= János Henzsel =

Hungarian cyclist

Personal information
- Born: 15 August 1881 Nyíregyháza, Hungary
- Died: 28 February 1970 (aged 88) Budapest

Cycling career
- Sport: Cycling

János Henzsel (1881–1970) was a Hungarian cyclist. He competed in two events at the 1912 Summer Olympics.
