= Jerome Steinert =

American cyclist

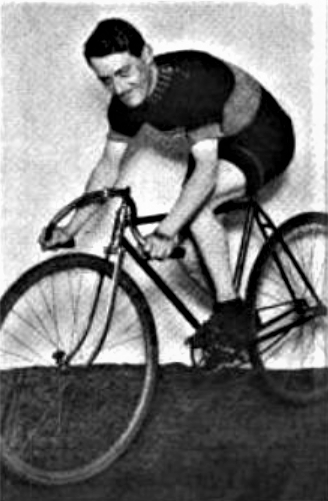

Personal information
- Born: November 6, 1883 Hicksville, New York, United States
- Died: October 6, 1966 (aged 82) New York, United States

Cycling career
- Sport: Cycling

Jerome Steinert (November 6, 1883 – October 6, 1966) was an American cyclist. He competed in two events at the 1912 Summer Olympics.
