= John Sedgewick =

British sports shooter

Personal information
- Born: 12 August 1873 Kendal, Westmorland, England
- Died: 13 August 1940 (aged 67)

Sport
- Sport: Sports shooting

John Sedgewick (12 August 1873 – 13 August 1940) was a British sports shooter. He competed in two events at the 1912 Summer Olympics.
