= Frank Meissner =

American cyclist

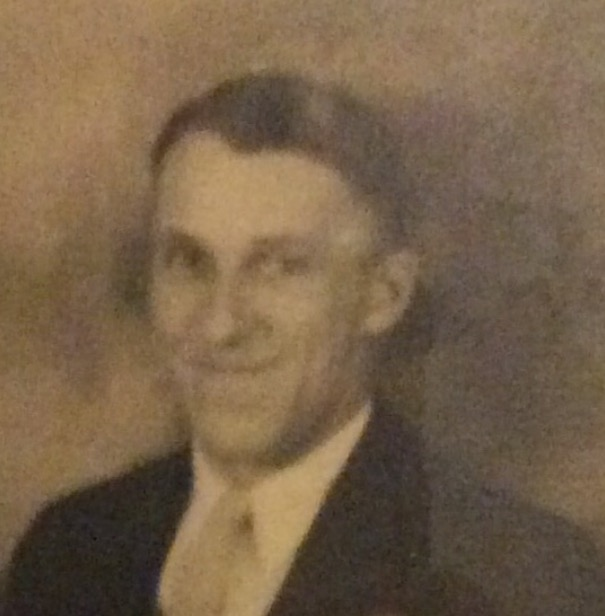

Personal information
- Full name: Frank August Meissner
- Born: July 19, 1894 Grand Rapids, Michigan, United States
- Died: May 14, 1966 (aged 71) Dewitt, Michigan, United States

Cycling career
- Sport: Cycling

Major wins
- Bronze medal at the 1912 Olympics

Frank Meissner (July 19, 1894 – May 14, 1966) was an American cyclist. He competed in two events at the 1912 Summer Olympics.
