= Valdemar Nielsen =

Danish cyclist

Personal information
- Born: 21 June 1879 Copenhagen, Denmark
- Died: 3 June 1954 (aged 74)

Cycling career
- Sport: Cycling

Valdemar Nielsen (21 June 1879 – 3 June 1954) was a Danish cyclist. He competed in two events at the 1912 Summer Olympics. In 1911 he won the Danish 345 km long-distance classic Sjælland Rundt.
