= Martin Koch (cyclist) =

German cyclist

Personal information
- Born: 4 September 1887 Ingolstadt, German Empire
- Died: 1 August 1961 (aged 73) Bad Godesberg, West Germany

Cycling career
- Sport: Cycling

Martin Koch (4 September 1887 – 1 August 1961) was a German cyclist. He competed in two events at the 1912 Summer Olympics.
