= Ignác Teiszenberger =

Hungarian cyclist

Personal information
- Born: 11 December 1881 Budapest, Hungary

Cycling career
- Sport: Cycling

Ignác Teiszenberger (born 11 December 1881, date of death unknown) was a Hungarian cyclist. He competed in two events at the 1912 Summer Olympics.
