= Werner Karlsson =

Swedish cyclist

Personal information
- Born: 8 July 1887 Gnesta, Sweden
- Died: 5 February 1946 (aged 58) Stockholm, Sweden

Cycling career
- Sport: Cycling

Werner Karlsson (8 July 1887 – 5 February 1946) was a Swedish cyclist. He competed in two events and won gold at the 1912 Summer Olympics.
