= Hermann Smiel =

German cyclist

Personal information
- Born: 31 July 1880 Burg (Spreewald), German Empire
- Died: 14 March 1956 (aged 75) Cottbus, East Germany

Cycling career
- Sport: Cycling

Hermann Smiel (31 July 1880 – 14 March 1956) was a German cyclist. He competed in two events at the 1912 Summer Olympics.
