= Carl Lundquist =

Swedish cyclist

Personal information
- Born: 30 October 1891 Stockholm, Sweden
- Died: 10 January 1916 (aged 24) Stockholm, Sweden

Cycling career
- Sport: Cycling

Carl Lundquist (30 October 1891 – 10 January 1916) was a Swedish cyclist. He competed in two events at the 1912 Summer Olympics.
