= Nikolajs Rasso =

Russian long-distance runner

Personal information
- Nationality: Russian
- Born: 18 October 1890

Sport
- Sport: Long-distance running
- Event: Marathon

Nikolajs Rasso (born 18 October 1890, date of death unknown) was a Russian long-distance runner. He competed in the marathon at the 1912 Summer Olympics.
