= Robert Thompson (cyclist) =

Scottish cyclist

Personal information
- Born: 21 November 1884 Coldstream, Scottish Borders
- Died: 1974 (aged 91–92)

Cycling career
- Sport: Cycling

Robert Thompson (21 November 1884 – 1974) was a Scottish road racing cyclist who competed in the 1912 Summer Olympics. Thompson was born in Coldstream in the Scottish Borders.

In 1912, he was a member of the Scotland cycling team, which finished fourth in the team time trial. In the individual time trial he finished 24th.
