= David Stevenson (cyclist) =

Scottish cyclist

Personal information
- Born: 17 January 1882 Clough, Ireland
- Died: 12 January 1938 (aged 55)

Cycling career
- Sport: Cycling

David M. Stevenson (17 January 1882 – 12 January 1938) was an Ulster Scot road racing cyclist who competed in the 1912 Summer Olympics. He was born in Clough, Ireland. In 1912, he was a member of the Scotland cycling team, which finished fourth in the team time trial event. In the individual time trial competition he finished 41st.
