= Arvid Pettersson =

Swedish cyclist

Personal information
- Born: 31 March 1893 Töreboda, Sweden
- Died: 7 May 1956 (aged 63) Boden, Sweden

Cycling career
- Sport: Cycling

Arvid Pettersson (31 March 1893 – 7 May 1956) was a Swedish cyclist. He competed in two events at the 1912 Summer Olympics.
