= Matthew Walsh (cyclist) =

Irish cyclist

Personal information
- Born: 4 July 1887 Dublin, Ireland
- Died: 21 June 1975 (aged 87)

Cycling career
- Sport: Cycling

Matthew Walsh (4 July 1887 – 21 June 1975) was an Irish cyclist who competed in two events for Great Britain at the 1912 Summer Olympics.

== Career ==
Walsh won the Southern branch of the Irish Road Club 50-mile handicap around Navan in 1911, and a month before the Stockholm Olympics, finished fifth in their 100-mile handicap, which gained him selection onto the Great Britain team for the Games. In finishing in 82nd place in the road race, Walsh was the fifth fastest of the six Irish riders who finished 11th, out of the 12 in the team competition. In finishing 82nd in the individual race, Walsh was the first of the finishers not to receive a special diploma given to all finishers whose time was within 25% of the winner’s time – missing out by nearly eight minutes.

Career performance
| Date | Event/Race | Location | Result | | Distance | Duration |
| Date | Event/Race | Location | Individual | Team | Distance | Duration |
|---|---|---|---|---|---|---|
| X X 1911 | Irish Road Club 50-Mile Handicap | Navan, Ireland | 1 | - | 80 km | Unknown |
| X June 1912 | Irish Road Club 100-Mile Handicap | Ireland | 5 | - | 160 km | Unknown |
| 7 July 1912 | Olympic Games - Road Race | Stockholm, Sweden | 82 | 11 | 315 km | 24 Hours |
