= Francis Guy (cyclist) =

British cyclist

Personal information
- Born: 1885 Belfast, Ireland
- Died: 27 October 1947 (aged 61–62)

Cycling career
- Sport: Cycling

Francis Guy (1885 – 27 October 1947) was a British cyclist. He competed in two events at the 1912 Summer Olympics.
