= George Corsar =

British cyclist

Personal information
- Born: 7 February 1886 Inverness, Scotland
- Died: 16 September 1956 (aged 70)

Cycling career
- Sport: Cycling

George Corsar (7 February 1886 – 16 September 1956) was a British cyclist. He competed in two events at the 1912 Summer Olympics.
