= René Gagnet =

French cyclist

Personal information
- Born: 5 February 1891 Paris, France
- Died: 12 October 1951 (aged 60) Paris, France

Cycling career
- Sport: Cycling

René Gagnet (5 February 1891 – 12 October 1951) was a French cyclist. He competed in two events at the 1912 Summer Olympics.
