= Bernard Doyle =

Irish cyclist

Personal information
- Full name: Bernard Joseph Doyle
- Born: 9 April 1888 Campile, Wexford, Ireland
- Died: 21 December 1977 (aged 89)

Cycling career
- Sport: Cycling

Bernard Joseph Doyle (9 April 1888 – 12 December 1977) was an Irish cyclist who competed for Ireland in two events at the 1912 Summer Olympics.

At the 1912 Olympics England, Scotland and Ireland entered separate teams, to the chagrin of France, which made an objection the day before the race, which was turned down.

Doyle was born in Wexford and worked as a clerk in Dublin, where his family lived in Glasnevin. He was the last of the eight finishers in the six-man Ireland team in the team road race at the 1912 Olympics. In those Games, a few weeks after the Stockholm Games, Doyle won the Stevens Cup for the 50-mile handicap race organised by the Irish Road Club. He was the second fastest overall in 2-41:08, but won thanks to receiving a handicap of six seconds.
