= John Kirk (cyclist) =

British cyclist

Personal information
- Born: 20 November 1890 Kingston upon Hull, England
- Died: 25 March 1951 (aged 60) Kingston upon Hull, England

Cycling career
- Sport: Cycling

John Kirk (20 November 1890 – 25 March 1951) was a British cyclist. He competed in two events at the 1912 Summer Olympics.
