= René Rillon =

French cyclist

Personal information
- Born: 9 May 1892 Vétheuil, France
- Died: 13 October 1956 (aged 64) Paris, France

Cycling career
- Sport: Cycling

René Rillon (9 May 1892 – 13 October 1956) was a French cyclist. He competed in two events at the 1912 Summer Olympics.
