= Fridrihs Bošs =

Latvian cyclist

Frīdrihs Bošs
Personal information
- Full name: Fridrihs Benjamiņš Bošs
- Born: 7 February 1887 Valmiera, Russian Empire
- Died: 12 February 1950 (aged 63) Geesthacht, West Germany

Cycling career
- Sport: Cycling

Fridrihs Bošs (7 February 1887 – 12 February 1950) was a cyclist. He competed in two events at the 1912 Summer Olympics for the Russian Empire.
