= Alexis Michiels =

French cyclist

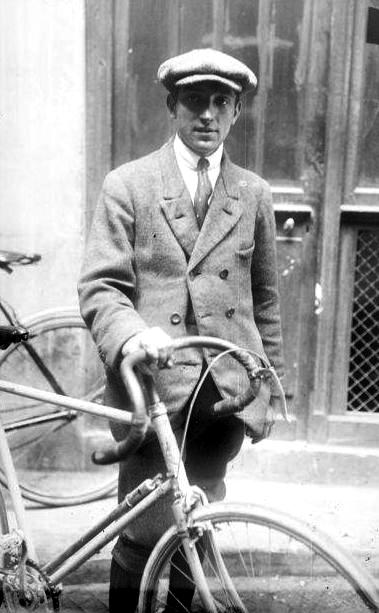

Personal information
- Born: 19 December 1893 Brussels, Belgium
- Died: 2 November 1976 (aged 82) Uccle, Belgium

Cycling career
- Sport: Cycling

Alexis Michiels (19 December 1893 – 2 November 1976) was a cyclist. He competed in two events at the 1912 Summer Olympics representing France. He also rode in the 1919 Tour de France.
