= André Lepère =

French cyclist

Personal information
- Born: 9 September 1878 Paris, France
- Died: 26 March 1964 (aged 85) Antibes, France

Cycling career
- Sport: Cycling

André Lepère (9 September 1878 – 26 March 1964) was a French cyclist. He competed at the 1908 Summer Olympics and the 1912 Summer Olympics.
