= Gaston Alancourt =

French cyclist

Personal information
- Born: 10 February 1888 Paris, France
- Died: 4 November 1964 (aged 76) Clichy, Hauts-de-Seine, France

Cycling career
- Sport: Cycling

Gaston Alancourt (10 February 1888 – 4 November 1964) was a French cyclist. He competed at the 1912 Summer Olympics and the 1920 Summer Olympics.
