= Francis Higgins (cyclist) =

British cyclist

Personal information
- Born: 29 January 1882 St Pancras, London, England
- Died: 19 August 1948 (aged 66) St Leonards-on-Sea, England

Cycling career
- Sport: Cycling

Francis Higgins (29 January 1882 – 19 August 1948) was a British cyclist. He competed in two events at the 1912 Summer Olympics.
