= Ernest Merlin =

British cyclist

Personal information
- Born: 5 September 1886 Clerkenwell, London, England
- Died: 10 March 1959 (aged 72) Islington, London, England

Cycling career
- Sport: Cycling

Ernest Merlin (5 September 1886 – 10 March 1959) was a British cyclist. He competed in two events at the 1912 Summer Olympics.
