= Sergey Pesteryev =

Russian cyclist

Sergey Petrovich Pesteryev
Personal information
- Born: 12 January 1888 Kharkov, Russian Empire (now Kharkiv, Ukraine)
- Died: 2 May 1942 (aged 54)

Cycling career
- Sport: Cycling

Sergey Petrovich Pesteryev (Russian: Сергей Петрович Пестерев; 12 January 1888 – 2 May 1942) was a Russian cyclist. He competed in two events at the 1912 Summer Olympics. He was arrested by Soviet authorities and sentenced to five years in a labor camp in April 1940; he died in prison two years later. Pesteryev was posthumously rehabilitated in 1999.
