= Charles Hill (cyclist) =

British cyclist (1886–1961)

Personal information
- Born: 15 August 1886 Edinburgh, Scotland
- Died: 15 April 1961 (aged 74) Edinburgh, Scotland

Cycling career
- Sport: Cycling

Charles Hill (15 August 1886 – 15 April 1961) was a British cyclist. He competed in two events at the 1912 Summer Olympics.
