= Joseph Racine =

French cyclist

Personal information
- Born: 18 July 1891 Clichy, Hauts-de-Seine, France
- Died: 28 October 1914 (aged 23) Meuse, France

Cycling career
- Sport: Cycling

Joseph Racine (18 July 1891 – 28 October 1914) was a French cyclist. He competed in two events at the 1912 Summer Olympics. He was killed in action during World War I.

== See also ==
- List of Olympians killed in World War I
