= Jacques Marcault =

French cyclist

Personal information
- Born: 7 December 1883 Paris, France
- Died: 18 January 1979 (aged 95) Rochecorbon, France

Cycling career
- Sport: Cycling

Jacques Marcault (7 December 1883 – 18 January 1979) was a French cyclist. He competed in two events at the 1912 Summer Olympics.
