= Herbert Gayler =

British cyclist

Personal information
- Born: 3 December 1881 Chislehurst, Kent, England
- Died: 23 June 1917 (aged 35) South Waziristan, British India

Cycling career
- Sport: Cycling

Herbert Gayler (3 December 1881 – 23 June 1917) was a British cyclist. He competed in two events at the 1912 Summer Olympics. He was killed in action during the First World War.

Gayler served as a private in the London Regiment during the First World War. He took part in the Waziristan campaign against the Mahsud tribe, and was killed by sniper fire in an ambush on 23 June 1917. Gayler is commemorated at India Gate.

== See also ==
- List of Olympians killed in World War I
