= Georges Valentin =

French cyclist

Personal information
- Born: 24 January 1892 Saint-Varent, France
- Died: 21 September 1981 (aged 89) Niort, France

Cycling career
- Sport: Cycling

Georges Valentin (24 January 1892 – 21 September 1981) was a French cyclist. He competed in two events at the 1912 Summer Olympics.
