= John Miller (cyclist) =

Scottish cyclist

Personal information
- Born: 27 February 1881 Pittsburgh, Pennsylvania, United States
- Died: 10 April 1957 (aged 76) Romford, London

Cycling career
- Sport: Cycling

John Miller (27 February 1881 – 10 April 1957) was a Scottish road racing cyclist who competed for Scotland in the 1912 Summer Olympics. He came 35th in the individual time trial. Scotland came fourth in the team event. He was born in Pittsburgh, United States.
