= Edgars Rihters =

Latvian cyclist

Personal information
- Born: 6 June 1887 Riga, Russian Empire (now Latvia)
- Died: 16 March 1931 (aged 43) Riga, Russian Empire (now Latvia)

Cycling career
- Sport: Cycling

Edgars Rihters (6 June 1887 – 16 March 1931), also known as Edgars Richters or Edgars Rikhter (Russian: Эдгарс Рихтерс), was a Russian cyclist. He competed in two events at the 1912 Summer Olympics.
