= James Stevenson (cyclist) =

British cyclist (1877–1936)

Personal information
- Born: 5 February 1877 North Lanarkshire, Scotland
- Died: 1 December 1936 (aged 59)

Cycling career
- Sport: Cycling

James Stevenson (5 February 1877 – 1 December 1936) was a British cyclist. He competed in two events at the 1912 Summer Olympics.
