= André Capelle =

French cyclist (1891–1972)

Personal information
- Born: 13 November 1891 Paris, France
- Died: 30 January 1972 (aged 80) Haute-Saône, France

Cycling career
- Sport: Cycling

André Capelle (13 November 1891 – 30 January 1972) was a French cyclist. He competed in two events at the 1912 Summer Olympics.
