= Ralph Mecredy =

Irish cyclist

Personal information
- Born: 12 July 1888 Dublin, Ireland
- Died: 19 November 1968 (aged 80) Cuckfield, England

Cycling career
- Sport: Cycling

Ralph Jack Richard Mecredy (12 July 1888 – 19 November 1968) was an Irish cyclist who competed for Great Britain in two events at the 1912 Summer Olympics. He was the son of Irish champion cyclist Richard J. Mecredy.

In the 1911 census of Ireland Mecredy lists his religion as Buddhist and lives with other Buddhists in Gilford Road, Dublin.

Mecredy was educated at Trinity College Dublin. While he was there, he was known for winning both athletic (track and field) events and cycling events on the same day, which the Irish Post and Weekly Telegraph claimed, "a feat for which we believe the history of the college races does not afford a parallel."

From 1913 to 1915 he spent time studying medicine in the US. He was on board the RMS Lusitania when it sank in 1915, and was lucky to survive.
