= Arthur Stokes (cyclist) =

British cyclist

Personal information
- Born: 13 November 1875 Coventry, England
- Died: 4 April 1949 (aged 73) Coventry, England

Cycling career
- Sport: Cycling

Arthur Stokes (13 November 1875 – 4 April 1949) was a British cyclist. He competed in two events at the 1912 Summer Olympics.
