= Fyodor Borisov =

Russian cyclist

Personal information
- Born: 5 February 1892 Moscow, Russian Empire
- Died: 1964 (aged 71–72)

Cycling career
- Sport: Cycling

Fyodor Borisov (5 February 1892 – 1964) was a Russian cyclist. He competed in two events at the 1912 Summer Olympics.
