= Augusts Kepke =

Latvian cyclist

Personal information
- Born: 6 January 1886 Riga, Russian Empire (now Latvia)

Cycling career
- Sport: Cycling

Augusts Kepke (born 6 January 1886, date of death unknown), also known as August Köpke (Russian: Август Кепке), was a Latvian cyclist. He competed in two events for the Russian Empire at the 1912 Summer Olympics.
