= Jēkabs Bukse =

Latvian cyclist

Personal information
- Born: 14 June 1879 Livonia, Russian Empire
- Died: 12 May 1942 (aged 62) Solikamsk, Russian SFSR, Soviet Union

Cycling career
- Sport: Cycling

Jēkabs Bukse (14 June 1879 – 12 May 1942) was a Latvian cyclist. He competed in two events for the Russian Empire at the 1912 Summer Olympics. Bukse was arrested by Soviet authorities in 1941 and died in prison the following year.
