= Louis Bès =

French cyclist

Personal information
- Born: 25 December 1891 Paris, France
- Died: 1 January 1961 (aged 69) Sainte-Geneviève-sur-Argence, France

Cycling career
- Sport: Cycling

Louis Bès (25 December 1891 – 1 January 1961) was a French cyclist. He competed in two events at the 1912 Summer Olympics.
