= Stanley Jones (cyclist) =

British cyclist

Personal information
- Born: 24 March 1888 London, England
- Died: 9 March 1962 (aged 73) Barnet, London

Cycling career
- Sport: Cycling

Stanley Jones (24 March 1888 – 9 March 1962) was a British cyclist. He competed in two events at the 1912 Summer Olympics.
