= Jānis Līvens =

Latvian cyclist

Personal information
- Born: 16 May 1884 Riga, Russian Empire

Cycling career
- Sport: Cycling

Jānis Līvens (born 16 May 1884, date of death unknown) was a Latvian cyclist. He competed in two events at the 1912 Summer Olympics for the Russian Empire.
