= Pierre Peinaud =

French cyclist

Personal information
- Born: 9 February 1890 Vichy, France
- Died: 12 June 1962 (aged 72) Villemomble, France

Cycling career
- Sport: Cycling

Pierre Peinaud (9 February 1890 – 12 June 1962) was a French cyclist. He competed in two events at the 1912 Summer Olympics.
