= Étienne Chéret =

French cyclist

Personal information
- Born: 25 July 1886 Neuilly-sur-Seine, France
- Died: 14 April 1967 (aged 80) Beauvais, France

Cycling career
- Sport: Cycling

Étienne Chéret (25 July 1886 – 14 April 1967) was a French cyclist. He competed in two events at the 1912 Summer Olympics.
