= Arthur Gibbon =

British cyclist

Personal information
- Born: 22 August 1886 Folkestone, England
- Died: 19 May 1968 (aged 81) Folkestone, England

Cycling career
- Sport: Cycling

Arthur Gibbon (22 August 1886 – 19 May 1968) was a British cyclist. He competed in two events at the 1912 Summer Olympics.

Gibbon also served as a corporal in the Royal Flying Corps during the First World War.
