= Arthur Griffiths (cyclist) =

British cyclist

Personal information
- Born: 30 November 1881 Morriston, Swansea, Wales
- Died: 9 April 1946 (aged 64)

Cycling career
- Sport: Cycling

Arthur Griffiths (30 November 1881 – 9 April 1946) was a British cyclist. He competed in two events at the 1912 Summer Olympics.
