= Jānis Prātnieks =

Latvian cyclist

Personal information
- Born: 27 July 1887 Courland Governorate, Russian Empire

Cycling career
- Sport: Cycling

Jānis Prātnieks (born 27 July 1887, date of death unknown) was a Latvian cyclist. He competed for the Russian Empire in two events at the 1912 Summer Olympics.
