= John Walker (cyclist) =

Irish cyclist

Personal information
- Born: 23 December 1888 Dublin, Ireland
- Died: 20 January 1954 (aged 65)

Cycling career
- Sport: Cycling

John Walker (23 December 1888 – 20 January 1954) was an Irish cyclist who competed in two events for Ireland at the 1912 Summer Olympics in Stockholm, when Ireland and Scotland sent separate national teams to compete.
