= Kārlis Kepke =

Latvian cyclist

Personal information
- Born: 18 November 1890 Riga, Russian Empire

Cycling career
- Sport: Cycling

Kārlis Kepke (18 November [O.S. 6 November] 1890 – after 1951) was a Latvian cyclist. He competed in two events at the 1912 Summer Olympics for the Russian Empire.

Records show he survived the World Wars and was in the Rostweg displaced persons camp in Hausbruch, Hamburg, in 1951.
