= Rapid fire pistol at the Olympics =

Olympic sport

ISSF 25 meter rapid fire pistol at the Olympic Games
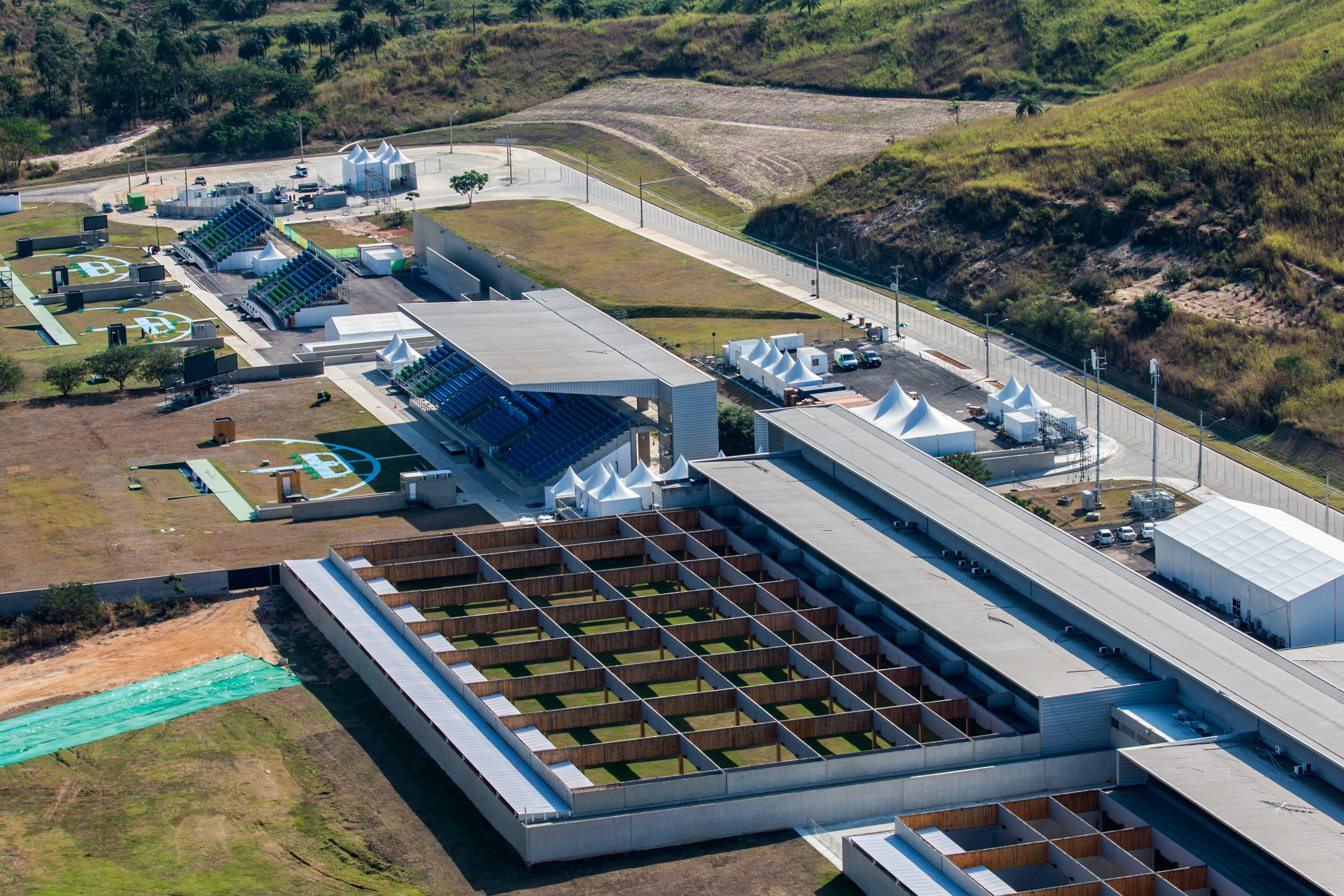
- 2016 Olympic shooting range

Overview
- Sport: Shooting
- Gender: Men
- Years held: Men: 1896, 1900, 1912–1924, 1932–2024

Reigning champion
- Men: Li Yuehong (CHN)

The rapid fire pistol is the only shooting event on the current Olympic programme that dates back to 1896, since the removal of the men's free pistol. The current rapid fire pistol event is the ISSF 25 meter rapid fire pistol. The format and rules for the rapid fire pistol event changed widely in the early Olympics. The event format has been largely standardized since 1924, though there have been significant rule changes since.

There has never been a women's version of the rapid fire pistol event; the current programme pairs the men's rapid fire pistol with the women's free pistol for gender equality. The event was nominally open to women from 1968 to 1980, although very few women participated these years.

A team event was held twice, in 1912 and 1920.

== Variants ==
The early Games had a few variants of the event:

- 1896: The event featured "muzzle-loading" pistols, which were required to be of .45 caliber. The distance was 25 metres, the current standard. As with other 1896 events, a multiplicative scoring system was used. Timing is unknown.
- 1900: This event was limited to professionals (a significant departure from the general amateurism principles of the time). Only six shots were fired per shooter. The pistols used are sometimes described as "military" pistols. Timing is unknown. Distance was 20 metres.
- 1912: This was a "dueling pistols" event. The timing in this event involved single shots rather than true rapid fire, but the target would appear for only 3 seconds for each shot. A full silhouette target was used. Distance was 30 metres. Hits, rather than score, was used as the first criterion for ranking shooters; only those tied on hits were sorted by score.
- 1920: Like 1900, this is sometimes identified as a "military" pistols event. The distance was 30 metres. Shooters fired 30 shots each, with targets that had scoring circles up to 10 points apiece. Shooters had the option of using their team event score or shooting again for the individual match.
- 1924–1936: These three Games used variations on a hit-or-miss theme. Shots were fired in series of 6 shots, each at 6 targets. The score for the series was how many targets were hit; there were no scoring rings. The initial round used 3 series (maximum score 18), while successive rounds of 1 series each were used to narrow the field from those who scored perfectly. In 1924, the first round had the targets available for 10 seconds, with all later rounds being 8 seconds; for the other two Games, the first round was 8 seconds and the later rounds got faster each round, down to 2 seconds in the fifth round.

== Medals ==
=== Men ===
Games	Gold	Silver	Bronze
1896 Athens	Ioannis Frangoudis; Greece	Georgios Orphanidis; Greece	Holger Nielsen; Denmark
1900 Paris	Maurice Larrouy; France	Léon Moreaux; France	Eugène Balme; France
1904 St. Louis	Not held		
1908 London	Not held		
1912 Stockholm	Alfred Lane; United States	Paul Palén; Sweden	Johan Hübner von Holst; Sweden
1920 Antwerp	Guilherme Paraense; Brazil	Raymond Bracken; United States	Fritz Zulauf; Switzerland
1924 Paris	Henry Bailey; United States	Vilhelm Carlberg; Sweden	Lennart Hannelius; Finland
1928 Amsterdam	Not held		
1932 Los Angeles	Renzo Morigi; Italy	Heinrich Hax; Germany	Domenico Matteucci; Italy
1936 Berlin	Cornelius van Oyen; Germany	Heinrich Hax; Germany	Torsten Ullman; Sweden
1948 London	Károly Takács; Hungary	Carlos Enrique Díaz Sáenz Valiente; Argentina	Sven Lundquist; Sweden
1952 Helsinki	Károly Takács; Hungary	Szilárd Kun; Hungary	Gheorghe Lichiardopol; Romania
1956 Melbourne	Ștefan Petrescu; Romania	Yevgeny Cherkasov; Soviet Union	Gheorghe Lichiardopol; Romania
1960 Rome	Bill McMillan; United States	Pentti Linnosvuo; Finland	Aleksandr Zabelin; Soviet Union
1964 Tokyo	Pentti Linnosvuo; Finland	Ion Tripșa; Romania	Lubomír Nácovský; Czechoslovakia
1968 Mexico City (mixed)	Józef Zapędzki; Poland	Marcel Roșca; Romania	Renart Suleymanov; Soviet Union
1972 Munich (mixed)	Józef Zapędzki; Poland	Ladislav Falta; Czechoslovakia	Viktor Torshin; Soviet Union
1976 Montreal (mixed)	Norbert Klaar; East Germany	Jürgen Wiefel; East Germany	Roberto Ferraris; Italy
1980 Moscow (mixed)	Corneliu Ion; Romania	Jürgen Wiefel; East Germany	Gerhard Petritsch; Austria
1984 Los Angeles	Takeo Kamachi; Japan	Corneliu Ion; Romania	Rauno Bies; Finland
1988 Seoul	Afanasijs Kuzmins; Soviet Union	Ralf Schumann; East Germany	Zoltán Kovács; Hungary
1992 Barcelona	Ralf Schumann; Germany	Afanasijs Kuzmins; Latvia	Vladimir Vokhmyanin; Unified Team
1996 Atlanta	Ralf Schumann; Germany	Emil Milev; Bulgaria	Vladimir Vokhmyanin; Kazakhstan
2000 Sydney	Sergei Alifirenko; Russia	Michel Ansermet; Switzerland	Iulian Raicea; Romania
2004 Athens	Ralf Schumann; Germany	Sergei Polyakov; Russia	Sergei Alifirenko; Russia
2008 Beijing	Oleksandr Petriv; Ukraine	Ralf Schumann; Germany	Christian Reitz; Germany
2012 London	Leuris Pupo; Cuba	Vijay Kumar; India	Ding Feng; China
2016 Rio de Janeiro	Christian Reitz; Germany	Jean Quiquampoix; France	Li Yuehong; China
2020 Tokyo	Jean Quiquampoix; France	Leuris Pupo; Cuba	Li Yuehong; China
2024 Paris	Li Yuehong; China	Cho Yeong-jae; South Korea	Wang Xinjie; China

==== Multiple medalists ====
Rank	Gymnast	Nation	Olympics	Gold	Silver	Bronze	Total
1	Ralf Schumann	East Germany; Germany	1988–1996, 2004–2008	3	2	0	5
2	Károly Takács	Hungary	1948–1952	2	0	0	2
2	Józef Zapędzki	Poland	1968–1972	2	0	0	2
4	Pentti Linnosvuo	Finland	1960–1964	1	1	0	2
4	Corneliu Ion	Romania	1980–1984	1	1	0	2
4	Afanasijs Kuzmins	Soviet Union; Latvia	1988–1992	1	1	0	2
7	Sergei Alifirenko	Russia	2000–2004	1	0	1	2
7	Christian Reitz	Germany	2008, 2016	1	0	1	2
9	Heinrich Hax	Germany	1932–1936	0	2	0	2
9	Jürgen Wiefel	East Germany	1976–1980	0	2	0	2
11	Gheorghe Lichiardopol	Romania	1952–1956	0	0	2	2
11	Vladimir Vokhmyanin	Unified Team; Kazakhstan	1992–1996	0	0	2	2

==== Medalists by nation ====
Rank	Nation	Gold	Silver	Bronze	Total
1	Germany (GER)	5	3	1	9
2	United States (USA)	3	1	0	4
3	Romania (ROU)	2	3	3	8
4	France (FRA)	2	2	1	5
5	Hungary (HUN)	2	1	1	4
6	Poland (POL)	2	0	0	2
7	East Germany (GDR)	1	3	0	4
8	Soviet Union (URS)	1	1	3	5
9	Finland (FIN)	1	1	2	4
10	Russia (RUS)	1	1	1	3
11	Cuba (CUB)	1	1	0	2
11	Greece (GRE)	1	1	0	2
13	China (CHN)	1	0	3	4
14	Italy (ITA)	1	0	2	3
15	Brazil (BRA)	1	0	0	1
15	Japan (JPN)	1	0	0	1
15	Ukraine (UKR)	1	0	0	1
18	Sweden (SWE)	0	2	3	5
19	Czechoslovakia (TCH)	0	1	1	2
19	Switzerland (SUI)	0	1	1	2
21	Argentina (ARG)	0	1	0	1
21	Bulgaria (BUL)	0	1	0	1
21	India (IND)	0	1	0	1
21	Latvia (LAT)	0	1	0	1
21	South Korea (KOR)	0	1	0	1
26	Austria (AUT)	0	0	1	1
26	Denmark (DEN)	0	0	1	1
26	Kazakhstan (KAZ)	0	0	1	1
26	Unified Team at the Olympics (EUN)	0	0	1	1
Totals (29 entries)		27	27	26	80

== Team rapid fire pistol ==
=== Men ===
Games	Gold	Silver	Bronze
1912 Stockholm	Eric Carlberg, Vilhelm Carlberg, Johan Hübner von Holst, Paul Palén; Sweden	Amos Kash, Nikolai Melnitsky, Grigori Panteleimonov, Pavel Voyloshnikov; Russia	Hugh Durant, Albert Kempster, Horatio Poulter, Charles Stewart; Great Britain
1920 Antwerp	Louis Harant, Alfred Lane, Karl Frederick, James H. Snook, Michael Kelly; United States	Alexandros Vrasivanopoulos, Georgios Moraitinis, Iason Sappas, Alexandros Theofilakis, Ioannis Theofilakis; Greece	Fritz Zulauf, Joseph Jehle, Gustave Amoudruz, Hans Egli, Domenico Giambonini; Switzerland
