= Shooting at the 1912 Summer Olympics – Men's 50 metre team pistol =

Olympic shooting event

Men's 50 metre team free pistol at the Games of the V Olympiad
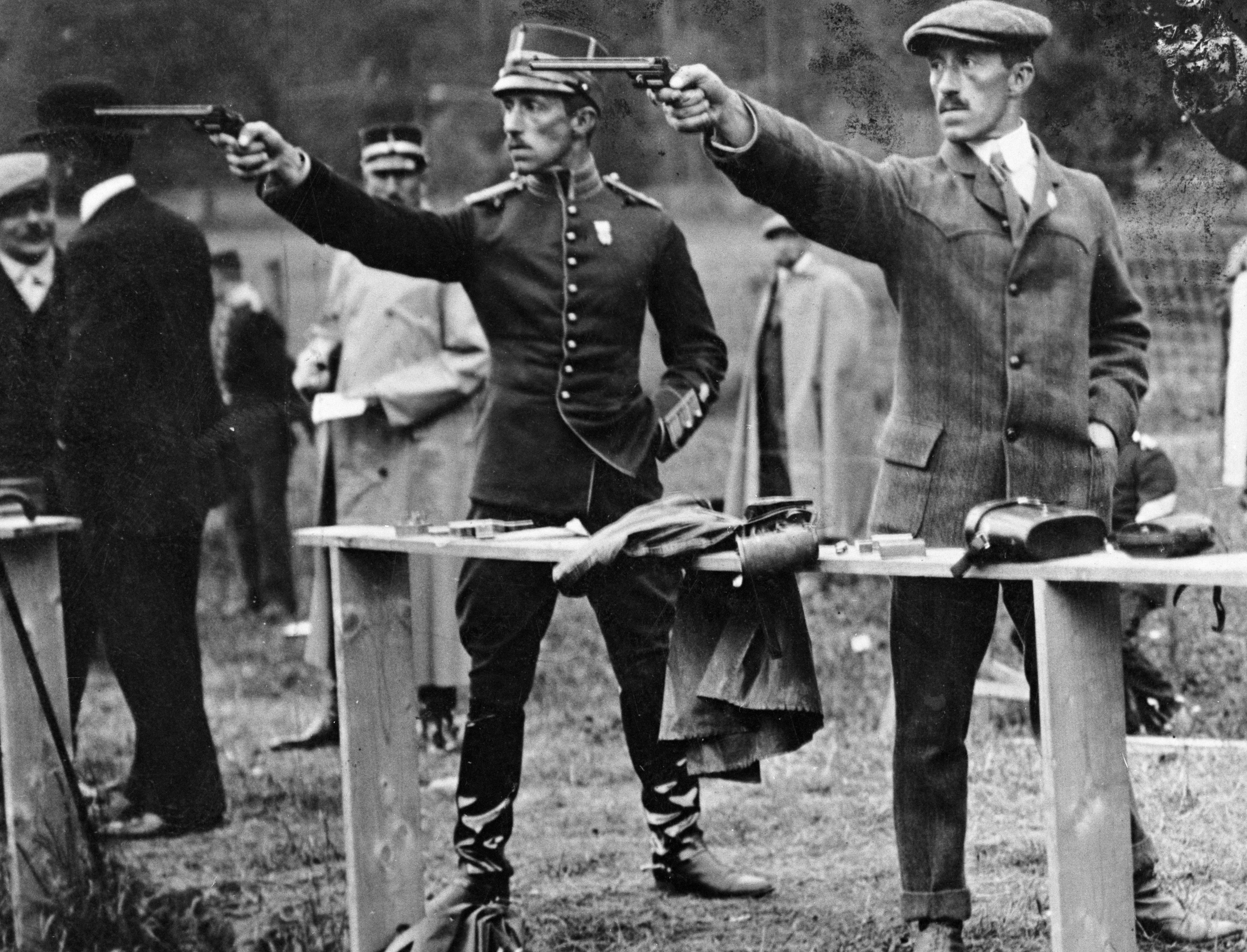
- Eric Carlberg and Vilhelm Carlberg, of the silver medal Sweden team
- Venue: Kaknäs
- Date: 2 July 1912
- Competitors: 20 from 5 nations
- Winning score: 1916

Medalists
1st place, gold medalist(s)		United States: John Dietz; Peter Dolfen; Alfred Lane; Harry Sears
2nd place, silver medalist(s)		Sweden: Erik Boström; Eric Carlberg; Vilhelm Carlberg; Georg de Laval
3rd place, bronze medalist(s)		Great Britain: Hugh Durant; Albert Kempster; Horatio Poulter; Charles Stewart

The men's 50 metre team pistol (originally called team competition with revolver and pistol) was a shooting sports event held as part of the shooting at the 1912 Summer Olympics programme. It was the third appearance of the event, which had also been held in 1900 and 1908. The competition was held on Tuesday, 2 July 1912. Twenty sport shooters from five nations competed. The event was won by the United States, successfully defending its Olympic title. The American team included John Dietz, a veteran of the 1908 Games, making him the first to win multiple medals in the event. Silver went to Sweden. Great Britain repeated as bronze medalists.

== Background ==
This was the third appearance of a team version of what would become (for individuals) standardised as the men's ISSF 50 meter pistol event. The team event was held 4 times, at every Summer Olympics from 1900 to 1920 (except 1904, when no shooting events were held).

The Russian Empire made its debut in the event. The other four nations were all making their second appearance; each had competed in 1908 but not 1900.

== Competition format ==
The competition had each shooter fire 60 shots, in 10 series of 6 shots each, at a distance of 50 metres. The time allowed for each series was 4 minutes. The target was round, 50 centimetres in diameter, with 10 scoring rings. Scoring for each shot was up to 10 points, in increments of 1 point. The maximum score possible was 600 points. Ties were broken by countback (10s, 9s, 8s, etc.). Any revolver or pistol could be used; only open sights were allowed. Any ammunition with a metal cartridge case could be used. Pistols with hairspring triggers, allowed in the world championship, were banned. The individual and team events were separate, with scores not carrying over.

== Schedule ==
Date	Time	Round
Tuesday, 2 July 1912	12:00	Final

== Results ==
Rank	Nation	Shooter	Score
1st place, gold medalist(s)	United States	United States total	1916
1st place, gold medalist(s)	United States	Alfred Lane	509
1st place, gold medalist(s)	United States	Harry Sears	474
1st place, gold medalist(s)	United States	Peter Dolfen	467
1st place, gold medalist(s)	United States	John Dietz	466
2nd place, silver medalist(s)	Sweden	Sweden total	1849
2nd place, silver medalist(s)	Sweden	Georg de Laval	475
2nd place, silver medalist(s)	Sweden	Eric Carlberg	472
2nd place, silver medalist(s)	Sweden	Vilhelm Carlberg	459
2nd place, silver medalist(s)	Sweden	Erik Boström	443
3rd place, bronze medalist(s)	Great Britain	Great Britain total	1804
3rd place, bronze medalist(s)	Great Britain	Horatio Poulter	461
3rd place, bronze medalist(s)	Great Britain	Hugh Durant	456
3rd place, bronze medalist(s)	Great Britain	Albert Kempster	452
3rd place, bronze medalist(s)	Great Britain	Charles Stewart	435
4	Russian Empire	Russian Empire total	1801
4	Russian Empire	Nikolai Panin-Kolomenkin	469
4	Russian Empire	Grigori Shesterikov	448
4	Russian Empire	Pavel Voyloshnikov	447
4	Russian Empire	Nikolai Melnitsky	437
5	Greece	Greece total	1731
5	Greece	Frangiskos Mavrommatis	454
5	Greece	Ioannis Theofilakis	442
5	Greece	Konstantinos Skarlatos	429
5	Greece	Alexandros Theofilakis	406
