= Shooting at the 1912 Summer Olympics =

Shooting at the Games of the V Olympiad

At the 1912 Summer Olympics in Stockholm, 18 events in shooting were contested.

== Medal summary ==
Event	Gold	Silver	Bronze
30 m rapid fire pistol	Alfred Lane; United States	Paul Palén; Sweden	Johan Hübner von Holst; Sweden
30 m rapid fire pistol, team	Sweden; Eric Carlberg; Vilhelm Carlberg; Johan Hübner von Holst; Paul Palén	Russian Empire; Amos Kash; Nikolai Melnitsky; Grigori Panteleimonov; Pavel Voyloshnikov	Great Britain; Hugh Durant; Albert Kempster; Horatio Poulter; Charles Stewart
50 m free pistol, individual	Alfred Lane; United States	Peter Dolfen; United States	Charles Stewart; Great Britain
50 m free pistol, team	United States; John Dietz; Peter Dolfen; Alfred Lane; Harry Sears	Sweden; Erik Boström; Eric Carlberg; Vilhelm Carlberg; Georg de Laval	Great Britain; Hugh Durant; Albert Kempster; Horatio Poulter; Charles Stewart
50 m rifle, prone	Frederick Hird; United States	William Milne; Great Britain	Henry Burt; Great Britain
300 metre free rifle, team	Sweden; Carl Björkman; Erik Blomqvist; Mauritz Eriksson; Hugo Johansson; Gustaf Adolf Jonsson; Bernhard Larsson	Norway; Albert Helgerud; Einar Liberg; Østen Østensen; Olaf Sæther; Ole Sæther; Gudbrand Skatteboe	Denmark; Niels Andersen; Jens Hajslund; Laurits Larsen; Niels Larsen; Lars Jørgen Madsen; Ole Olsen
300 m free rifle, three positions	Paul Colas; France	Lars Jørgen Madsen; Denmark	Niels Larsen; Denmark
600 m free rifle	Paul Colas; France	Carl Osburn; United States	John Jackson; United States
300 m military rifle, three positions	Sándor Prokopp; Hungary	Carl Osburn; United States	Engebret Skogen; Norway
Team military rifle	United States; Harry Adams; Allan Briggs; Cornelius Burdette; John Jackson; Carl Osburn; Warren Sprout	Great Britain; Henry Burr; Arthur Fulton; Harcourt Ommundsen; Edward Parnell; James Reid; Edward Skilton	Sweden; Carl Björkman; Tönnes Björkman; Mauritz Eriksson; Werner Jernström; Ole Olsen; Bernhard Larsson
25 m small-bore rifle	Vilhelm Carlberg; Sweden	Johan Hübner von Holst; Sweden	Gideon Ericsson; Sweden
25 m team small-bore rifle	Sweden; Gustaf Boivie; Eric Carlberg; Vilhelm Carlberg; Johan Hübner von Holst	Great Britain; William Milne; Joseph Pepé; William Pimm; William Styles	United States; Frederick Hird; William Leushner; William McDonnell; Warren Sprout
50 m team small-bore rifle	Great Britain; Edward Lessimore; Robert Murray; Joseph Pepé; William Pimm	Sweden; Eric Carlberg; Vilhelm Carlberg; Arthur Nordenswan; Ruben Örtegren	United States; Frederick Hird; William Leushner; Carl Osburn; Warren Sprout
100 m running deer, single shots	Alfred Swahn; Sweden	Åke Lundeberg; Sweden	Nestori Toivonen; Finland
100 m running deer, double shots	Åke Lundeberg; Sweden	Edward Benedicks; Sweden	Oscar Swahn; Sweden
100 m team running deer, single shots	Sweden; Per-Olof Arvidsson; Åke Lundeberg; Alfred Swahn; Oscar Swahn	United States; William Leushner; William Libbey; William McDonnell; Walter Winans	Finland; Axel Fredrik Londen; Ernst Rosenqvist; Nestori Toivonen; Iivar Väänänen
Trap	James Graham; United States	Alfred Goeldel; Germany	Harry Blau; Russian Empire
Trap, team	United States; Charles Billings; Edward Gleason; James Graham; Frank Hall; John H. Hendrickson; Ralph Spotts	Great Britain; John Butt; William Grosvenor; Harold Humby; Alexander Maunder; Charles Palmer; George Whitaker	Germany; Alfred Goeldel; Horst Goeldel; Erland Koch; Albert Preuß; Erich Graf von Bernstorff; Franz von Zedlitz und Leipe

== Participating nations ==
A total of 284 sport shooters from 16 nations competed at the Stockholm Games:

- Austria (7)
- Canada (3)
- Chile (2)
- Denmark (14)
- Finland (19)
- France (19)
- Germany (11)
- Great Britain (38)
- Greece (9)
- Hungary (10)
- Netherlands (1)
- Norway (28)
- Russian Empire (26)
- South Africa (8)
- Sweden (63)
- United States (26)

== Medal table ==
Rank	Nation	Gold	Silver	Bronze	Total
1	Sweden	7	6	4	17
2	United States	7	4	3	14
3	France	2	0	0	2
4	Great Britain	1	4	4	9
5	Hungary	1	0	0	1
6	Denmark	0	1	2	3
7	Germany	0	1	1	2
7	Norway	0	1	1	2
7	Russia	0	1	1	2
10	Finland	0	0	2	2
Totals (10 entries)		18	18	18	54
