= Shooting at the Summer Olympics =

- IOC Code: SHO
- Governing body: ISSF
- Events: 15 (men: 6; women: 6; mixed: 3)

Summer Olympics
- 1896; 1900; 1904; 1908; 1912; 1920; 1924; 1928; 1932; 1936; 1948; 1952; 1956; 1960; 1964; 1968; 1972; 1976; 1980; 1984; 1988; 1992; 1996; 2000; 2004; 2008; 2012; 2016; 2020; 2024; 2028; 2032
- Medalists; Records

Shooting sports have been included at every Summer Olympic Games since the birth of the modern Olympic movement at the 1896 Summer Olympics except at the 1904 and 1928 games.

== Summary ==
Games	Year	Events	Best nation
1	1896	5	Greece (1)
2	1900	9	Switzerland (1)
3			
4	1908	15	Great Britain (1)
5	1912	18	Sweden (1)
6			
7	1920	21	United States (1)
8	1924	10	United States (2)
9			
10	1932	2	Italy (1)
11	1936	3	Germany (1)
12			
13			
14	1948	4	United States (3)
15	1952	7	Norway (1)
16	1956	7	Soviet Union (1)
17	1960	6	Soviet Union (2)
18	1964	6	United States (4)
19	1968	7	Soviet Union (3)
20	1972	8	United States (5)
21	1976	7	East Germany (1)
22	1980	7	Soviet Union (4)
23	1984	11	United States (6)
24	1988	13	Soviet Union (5)
25	1992	13	Unified Team (1)
26	1996	15	Russia (1)
27	2000	17	China (1)
28	2004	17	China (2)
29	2008	15	China (3)
30	2012	15	South Korea (1)
31	2016	15	Italy (2)
32	2020	15	China (4)
33	2024	15	China (5)
34	2028	15	

== Events ==
Shooting was one of the nine events at the first modern Olympic Games in Athens, in 1896. Early competitions included some events now regarded as unusual, such as live pigeon shooting in 1900; dueling in 1906 and 1908; and numerous events restricted to military weapons. After the 1900 games, the pigeons were replaced with clay targets. In 1907, the International Shooting Sport Federation came into existence and brought some standardizations to the sport. Shooting events were held in 1908, 1912, 1920 and 1924.

When shooting was reintroduced in 1932, it consisted of two events. From this, the number of events have increased steadily until reaching the 2000–2004 maximum of seventeen events. The 2008 games had only fifteen. Events marked as "Men's" were nominally open events from 1968 until 1980 (and in shotgun events until 1992), although very few women competed in them. For instance, only five women competed at the 1980 Moscow Olympics, while the next Summer Olympics in Los Angeles, which introduced women-only events, featured 77 female competitors. Two women won medals in mixed events: Margaret Murdock, silver in rifle 3 positions (1976) and Zhang Shan, gold in skeet (1992).

Events on the current program are listed at the top.

=== Men's ===
Current programme
Event	96	00	04	08	12	20	24	28	32	36	48	52	56	60	64	68	72	76	80	84	88	92	96	00	04	08	12	16	20	24	28	Years
air pistol	Not introduced yet																				X	X	X	X	X	X	X	X	X	X	X	11
air rifle	Not introduced yet																			X	X	X	X	X	X	X	X	X	X	X	X	12
rapid fire pistol	X	X			X	X	X		X	X	X	X	X	X	X	X	X	X	X	X	X	X	X	X	X	X	X	X	X	X	X	27
rifle three positions	Not introduced yet											X	X	X	X	X	X	X	X	X	X	X	X	X	X	X	X	X	X	X	X	20
skeet	Not introduced yet															X	X	X	X	X	X	X	X	X	X	X	X	X	X	X	X	16
trap		X		X	X	X	X					X	X	X	X	X	X	X	X	X	X	X	X	X	X	X	X	X	X	X	X	25

Past events that occurred only once

Only at the 1896 Summer Olympics

- 200 metre military rifle
- 300 metre free rifle
- 25 metre military pistol

Only at the 1900 Summer Olympics

- 300 metre rifle kneeling
- 300 metre rifle prone
- 300 metre rifle standing

Only at the 1908 Summer Olympics

- Six-distance team military rifle
- Disappearing target small-bore rifle
- Moving target small-bore rifle
- 1000 yard rifle

Only at the 1912 Summer Olympics

- 300 metre military rifle, three positions
- 600 metre rifle
- 25 metre rifle, individual
- 25 metre rifle, team

Only at the 1920 Summer Olympics

- 300 metre military rifle; prone, individual
- 300 metre military rifle; prone, team
- 300 metre military rifle; standing, individual
- 300 metre military rifle; standing, team
- 600 metre military rifle; prone, individual
- 600 metre military rifle; prone, team
- 300 and 600 metre military rifle; prone, team
- 50 metre rifle, team standing

Only at the 1924 Summer Olympics

- 600 metre rifle prone

Past events that occurred twice to six times

- 300 metre rifle, team: 1900, 1908, 1912, 1920
- 100 metre running deer
  - Single shot, individual: 1908, 1912, 1920, 1924
  - Double shot, individual: 1908, 1912, 1920, 1924
  - Single shots, team: 1908, 1912, 1920, 1924
  - Double shots, team: 1920, 1924
  - Single/Double shots: 1952, 1956
- 50 metre running target: 1972, 1976, 1980, 1984, 1988
- 10 metre running target: 1992, 1996, 2000, 2004
- 50 metre rifle: 1920, 1924
- 50 metre rifle, team prone: 1908, 1912
- Pistol: 1900, 1908 ^{[6]}, 1912, 1920
- Rapid fire pistol, team: 1912^{[3]}, 1920^{[4]}
- Double trap: 1996, 2000, 2004, 2008, 2012, 2016
- Trap, team: 1908, 1912, 1920, 1924

Past events that occurred eleven or more times
Event	96	00	04	08	12	20	24	28	32	36	48	52	56	60	64	68	72	76	80	84	88	92	96	00	04	08	12	16	20	24	28	Years
300 metre rifle three positions		X		X	X	X					X	X	X	X	X	X	X	Not occurred since														11
50 meter rifle prone				X^{[5]}	X				X	X	X	X	X	X	X	X	X	X	X	X	X	X	X	X	X	X	X	X				23
pistol	X	X		X^{[6]}	X	X				X	X	X	X	X	X	X	X	X	X	X	X	X	X	X	X	X	X	X				24

- ^{a} Muzzle-loading pistols.
- ^{a} 20 metres, military pistols, professionals.
- ^{a} 30 metres, dueling pistols.
- ^{a} ^{b} 30 metres, military pistols.
- ^{a} 50 and 100 yards, miniature rifles.
- ^{a} ^{b} 50 yards.

=== Women's ===
Current programme
Event	96	00	04	08	12	20	24	28	32	36	48	52	56	60	64	68	72	76	80	84	88	92	96	00	04	08	12	16	20	24	28	Years
air pistol	Not introduced yet																				X	X	X	X	X	X	X	X	X	X	X	11
air rifle	Not introduced yet																			X	X	X	X	X	X	X	X	X	X	X	X	12
pistol	Not introduced yet																			X	X	X	X	X	X	X	X	X	X	X	X	12
rifle three positions	Not introduced yet																			X	X	X	X	X	X	X	X	X	X	X	X	12
skeet	Not introduced yet																							X	X	X	X	X	X	X	X	8
trap	Not introduced yet																							X	X	X	X	X	X	X	X	8

Past events

- Double trap: 1996, 2000, 2004

=== Mixed ===
Event	96	00	04	08	12	20	24	28	32	36	48	52	56	60	64	68	72	76	80	84	88	92	96	00	04	08	12	16	20	24	28	Years
air pistol, team	Not yet introduced																												X	X	X	3
air rifle, team	Not yet introduced																												X	X	X	3
skeet, team	Not yet introduced																													X		1
trap, team	Not yet introduced																												X		X	2
Total	0	0	0	0	0	0	0	0	0	0	0	0	0	0	0	0	0	0	0	0	0	0	0	0	0	0	0	0	3	3	3	

== Nations ==
Nation	96	00	04	08	12	20	24	28	32	36	48	52	56	60	64	68	72	76	80	84	88	92	96	00	04	08	12	16	20	24	Years
Afghanistan																													1		6
Albania																	4					2	2	1		1	1		1	1	6
Algeria																											1	1	1	3	2
Andorra																		2	2	2		1	1	1	1		1	1			9
Angola																							1	1				1			3
Argentina							8		2	5	12	7	4	7	8	4	5	6		6	3	2	6	4	3	1	2	5	4	3	20
Armenia																							1	1	1	1	1	1	1	1	6
Aruba																													1	1	1
Australasia				1																											1
Australia											6		12	7	8	3	4	6	2	9	12	7	16	23	21	17	17	18	15	10	17
Austria					7		6			3	3	3		5	3	5	7	8	8	10	11	5	3	4	5	3	4	5	2	5	20
Azerbaijan																							2	2	2	1	1	1	2	1	6
Bahrain																				4					1	1	1	1	1		5
Bangladesh																						1	1	1	1	1	1	1	1	1	7
Barbados																1	2					1	1	1	1			1			7
Belarus																							10	12	9	8	9	4	3		6
Belgium		11		10		24	14			3	3	4	2	3	1	3	6	5	3	6	6	4	4	1	1		1	1	1		22
Belize																2	1	2													3
Bhutan																											1	1	1		2
Bolivia																2	6	1		4		1			1	1	1	2			9
Bosnia and Herzegovina																						1	1	2	1	1	1	1	1		7
Brazil						5	1		6	4	7	8	4	3		2	4	8	5	8	4	2	1		1	2	2	9	1	3	20
British West Indies														2																	1
Brunei																							1	1							2
Bulgaria										1		6		5	4	6	5	7	11		6	13	9	6	3	4	4	3	3	2	16
Canada				22	3	7	6					4	5	7	6	10	10	11		17	13	12	9	9	2	4	2	2	1	3	20
Chile					2					3	4	2	3	2	3	4	2	3		4	1	2	1	2	1	1	1	1	1	2	19
China																				17	20	20	24	21	26	24	23	22	24	21	9
Chinese Taipei													1	3	6	8	1			3	3	2	2	1	2	1	3	4	5	8	14
Colombia													3	3	1		10	3		14	3	2	2	3	3	1	1	1	1		14
Costa Rica																5	1	1	6	3	1	1			1						8
Croatia																						4	4	2	1	4	5	7	4	3	7
Cuba											7	2				8	8	4	5			5	3	6	8	3	4	7	5	4	13
Czech Republic																							17	9	8	13	10	5	8	9	6
Czechoslovakia						8	18			7		6	4	9	4	8	8	10	11		14	17									13
Cyprus																				4	1	2	3	3	2	3	3	2	4	1	9
Denmark	3	5		10	14	15	7			6	7	5	2	4	2	6	7	7	4	3	6	7	8	4	5	1	5	3	4	3	25
Dominican Republic																3	2								1	1	1	1		1	6
East Germany																9	9	11	13		15										5
Ecuador																				4	2	1	1	1	1	1	1	1	2	2	9
Egypt							1			1		6			6	2				9	2	5	2	8	5	9	7	12	11	11	14
El Salvador																8	4			1				1	1	1	1	1		1	8
Estonia																						3	2	1	1	1	1	1	1	2	7
Fiji																									1	1	1	1			4
Finland				9	19	9	15			8	12	11	4	8	8	9	10	4	9	10	9	8	6	7	6	8	4	2	3	3	23
France	1	33		20	19	17	22			8	12	9	5	7	4	8	13	10		15	19	17	13	12	8	13	14	11	10	15	24
Georgia																							3	2	1	1	1	2	1	1	6
Germany				1	11				1	9		6										18	22	20	20	18	17	15	8	13	12
Great Britain	2	1		67	38	7	22				12	12	6	10	8	10	14	13		18	8	7	5	6	6	5	11	6	5	6	23
Greece	50			7	9	9	7			8	7	6	2	7	4	7	5	4	3	5	2	3	3	2	11	1	3	2	2	5	24
Guatemala												3				9	1	5	5	4	1	3	4	3	1	1	2	2	3	4	14
Haiti							5																								1
Honduras																											1				1
Hong Kong														3	5	3	1	6		7	1	1	1	1	1	1	1				13
Hungary				2	10		7		3	8	4	6	5	10	8	6	9	7	14		15	18	10	7	8	5	3	8	4	5	21
Iceland																						1		1			1		1	1	3
India												2	2	3	2	2	4	3	4	8	1	2	2	3	8	9	11	12	15	21	17
Independent Olympic Athletes																						8						6			2
Individual Neutral Athletes																															1
Indonesia													1	1						2	1				1	1	1		1		7
Iran											3			1	4			4					1	1	1		3	5	6		8
Iraq																						1	1				1		1		3
Ireland																3	4	1	4	2			3	3	1	1	1		1		10
Israel												4		2	3	4	2	1		3	2	3	3	2	2	3	1	1	1		15
Italy	1					10	14		6	9	6	8	5	9	5	7	11	13	10	12	13	13	15	15	13	15	15	14	14		23
Jamaica															1										1						2
Japan												1	6	8	10	6	6	11		15	14	11	9	9	9	5	4	8	12		16
Jordan																			4	7		1	1	1					1		5
Kazakhstan																							5	6	4	6	3	5	3		6
Kenya													2	3	4	3	9			2	1	2	1								9
Kosovo																												1	1		1
Kuwait																						2	2	5	5	3	4		4		6
Kyrgyzstan																							2	2	1	1	1		1		5
Laos																			6												1
Latvia										3												2	2	2	1	1	1	1	1		8
Lebanon											2	3		3	1	3	4			4				1	1	1	1	1	1		12
Libya																														1	1
Liechtenstein										3				2			2			2	1	1		1	1	1					9
Lithuania																							1	1	1	1	1	1	1		7
Luxembourg														4	1	1	1	1	1	1	2	3	2				1				11
North Macedonia																							1	1	1	1		1	1	1	5
Malaysia													3	2															1		2
Malaysia															7		1	2		1	1	1	1	1	2	1	1	1		1	12
Malta														2		1	1		2	2		1	1	1	1	1	1	2	1	1	12
Mexico							2		5	5	9	4	3	6	5	11	10	6	2	8	3	1	1	1	1	4	4	2	5	5	21
Moldova																							2	1	1	1	1		1	1	5
Monaco							4			6	4	6		6		2	4	4		4	1	1	1	1	1	1					15
Mongolia															3	3	4	4	2		3	2	2	3	1	3	2	3	4	3	13
Montenegro																										1	1		1		2
Morocco														4													1	1	1	1	3
Myanmar															2								1				1	1	1		4
Namibia																							1	1	1	1	1	1			6
Nepal																					1	1	1	1	1	1	1		1	1	7
Netherlands		7		17	1	15	11			4	4				1		3	2	4	4	5	4	2	3	3		1				18
Netherlands Antilles																	1				1	1	1	1		1					6
New Zealand																2	4	4		3	4	3	2	7	2	4	1	3	2	2	12
Nicaragua																						1	1	1	1	1		1	1	1	6
North Korea																	3	6	11			9	1	1	3	6	1	4			10
Norway		5		13	28	16	13			4	9	9	5	6	3	4	7	4		7	6	7	7	5	5	7	6	4	5	6	23
Oman																				8	1	1	1	1	1	1	1	2	1	1	9
Pakistan												1	2	4	4									1	1	1	1	2	3	3	9
Panama																							1	1				1			3
Palestine																														1	1
Papua New Guinea																		1		2											2
Paraguay																	1	1		6						1		1			5
Peru										1	9		8	10	9	5	2		7	7	3	2	3	2	1	1	1	2	3	2	17
Philippines										2	3	3	5	7	9	8	8	2		1		2	1	1	1	1	1		1		16
Poland							7			6		2	2	7	6	11	13	12	12		6	12	10	5	5	6	4	5	5	7	17
Portugal						5	8		4	6	5	4		9	4		5	1		5	2	4	4	3	2	2	2	1	1	1	18
Puerto Rico											2	5	3	4	3	9	8	8		2	2	2	2	2	1	1	1	1	1	1	17
Qatar																				4	1		1	1	2	2	3	2	1	2	8
Romania		1					5			4		4	4	9	9	12	10	7	5	6	3	5	4	3	2	4	2	1	1		20
Refugee Olympic Team																													1	2	2
Russia																							19	21	24	22	22	18			6
ROC																													17		1
Russian Empire					26																										1
Saar												2																			1
San Marino														4		2	6	7	10	10	2	2	2	2	2	1	1	3	2	1	14
Saudi Arabia																				6	1		1	1	1	1	1	1	1		8
Senegal																				2									1		1
Serbia																										5	8	9	7	3	3
Serbia and Montenegro																							7	6	3						3
Singapore														1		1		1			1	1	1	1	1	1	1	2	1	1	11
Slovakia																							3	3	3	7	7	5	7	6	6
Slovenia																						1	1	3	1	1	3	2	1		7
South Africa					8	7	7					1	2	5								2	2	3	1	2	1				12
South Korea													2	3	10	2	5	5		18	22	12	14	8	16	14	13	17	15	16	15
South Vietnam																3	2														2
Soviet Union												11	11	10	10	12	14	13	14		23										9
Spain						7	1		5		6	4		8	5	12	9	9	8	11	8	15	6	4	4	7	8	6	2	4	20
Sri Lanka															2		1				2	1	2	2	1	1	1	1	1		11
Sudan														3																	1
Swaziland																	1														1
Sweden				19	63	29	19		3	7	11	10	8	9	6	9	10	11	8	14	15	7	3	6	8	2	4	3	1	7	25
Switzerland	1	9				15	7				7	9		10	8	10	8	5		9	9	8	7	3	5	8	7	4	2	5	20
Syria																	2		4	1		1		1	1	1	1				8
Tajikistan																									1	1	1				3
Thailand														6	10	11	10	12		17	3	2	3	2	2	5	4	6	6	3	13
Trinidad and Tobago																2		1							1	1	1				5
Tunisia														2													1	1	2	1	3
Turkey																3	4	3		2	2	1	1	2	1	1	5	4	4	7	12
Turkmenistan																							1	1	1	1					4
Ukraine																							9	6	11	12	8	5	6	6	6
Unified Team																						22									1
United Team of Germany													2	10	10																3
United Arab Emirates																							1	2	2	2	3	3	1		6
United Arab Republic														3																	1
United States	3			17	26	29	21		6	6	12	6	8	9	10	12	14	14		20	24	21	25	28	21	22	20	20	20	17	24
Uruguay																3						1		1		1	1				5
Uzbekistan																							1	3	2	2	1	1	1		5
Venezuela												7	9	6	4	5	2		2	5				2	1	1	1	1	1	2	13
Vietnam																			7		1	1	1	1	1	1	2	2	1	2	9
Virgin Islands																	6	4		3	1	1	1	2	1	1					9
West Germany																12	14	12		18	18										5
Yemen																													1	1	2
Yugoslavia										1		6	1	6		4	2	5	3	6	6										10
Zimbabwe														1	2				8	3	2				1			1			7
No. of nations	7	8	0	14	16	18	27	0	10	29	28	41	37	59	51	62	71	60	38	68	66	83	100	103	106	103	108	97	98	81	
No. of shooters	61	72	0	215	284	234	258	0	41	141	188	218	156	313	262	351	397	344	239	460	396	407	419	408	390	390	390	390	360	340	
Year	96	00	04	08	12	20	24	28	32	36	48	52	56	60	64	68	72	76	80	84	88	92	96	00	04	08	12	16	20	24	

== Medal table ==
Updated after 2024 Olympics

Rank	Nation	Gold	Silver	Bronze	Total
1	United States	58	34	29	121
2	China	31	18	28	77
3	Italy	17	18	12	47
4	Soviet Union	17	15	17	49
5	Sweden	15	25	18	58
6	Great Britain	14	16	19	49
7	Norway	13	8	11	32
8	South Korea	10	12	1	23
9	Germany	10	9	5	24
10	France	9	13	9	31
11	Switzerland	8	6	11	25
12	Russia	7	13	11	31
13	Hungary	7	3	8	18
14	Romania	6	4	5	15
15	Unified Team	5	2	1	8
16	Australia	5	1	6	12
17	Finland	4	7	10	21
18	Bulgaria	4	7	6	17
19	Greece	4	4	5	13
20	West Germany	4	4	3	11
21	Poland	4	3	5	12
22	Ukraine	4	3	3	10
23	Canada	4	3	2	9
23	Czechoslovakia	4	3	2	9
25	Denmark	3	11	5	19
26	East Germany	3	8	5	16
27	Czech Republic	3	4	4	11
28	ROC (ROC)	2	4	2	8
29	Croatia	2	0	2	4
30	Yugoslavia	2	0	1	3
31	Belgium	1	5	3	9
32	Austria	1	2	5	8
33	Belarus	1	2	4	7
33	India	1	2	4	7
35	Japan	1	2	3	6
35	Slovakia	1	2	3	6
37	Serbia	1	2	2	5
38	Brazil	1	2	1	4
38	Serbia and Montenegro	1	2	1	4
38	Spain	1	2	1	4
41	Peru	1	2	0	3
42	Cuba	1	1	3	5
43	Chile	1	1	0	2
43	Vietnam	1	1	0	2
45	Azerbaijan	1	0	2	3
45	North Korea	1	0	2	3
45	Slovenia	1	0	2	3
48	Guatemala	1	0	1	2
48	Independent Olympic Athletes	1	0	1	2
48	United Team of Germany	1	0	1	2
51	Iran	1	0	0	1
51	Lithuania	1	0	0	1
51	United Arab Emirates	1	0	0	1
54	Kazakhstan	0	2	2	4
55	Colombia	0	2	0	2
56	Independent Olympic Participants	0	1	2	3
57	Mongolia	0	1	1	2
57	Netherlands	0	1	1	2
57	New Zealand	0	1	1	2
57	Russian Empire	0	1	1	2
57	San Marino	0	1	1	2
62	Argentina	0	1	0	1
62	Latvia	0	1	0	1
62	Mexico	0	1	0	1
62	Moldova	0	1	0	1
62	Portugal	0	1	0	1
62	South Africa	0	1	0	1
62	Turkey	0	1	0	1
69	Kuwait	0	0	3	3
70	Chinese Taipei	0	0	1	1
70	Georgia	0	0	1	1
70	Haiti	0	0	1	1
70	Qatar	0	0	1	1
70	Venezuela	0	0	1	1
Totals (74 entries)		302	303	302	907

== Multi-participation ==
Afanasijs Kuzmins with nine participations is the record holder in this special classification.

#	Athlete	Country	Editions	Event
9	Afanasijs Kuzmins	Latvia Soviet Union	1976, 1980, 1988, 1992, 1996, 2000, 2004, 2008, 2012	Pistol
8	Francisco Boza	Peru	1980, 1984, 1988, 1992, 1996, 2000, 2004, 2016	Shotgun
8	Rajmond Debevec	Slovenia Yugoslavia	1984, 1988, 1992, 1996, 2000, 2004, 2008, 2012	Rifle
8	Giovanni Pellielo	Italy	1992, 1996, 2000, 2004, 2008, 2012, 2016, 2024	Shotgun
7	François Lafortune Jr.	Belgium	1952, 1956, 1960, 1964, 1968, 1972, 1976	Rifle
7	Ralf Schumann	Germany East Germany	1988, 1992, 1996, 2000, 2004, 2008, 2012	Pistol
7	Ragnar Skanåker	Sweden	1972, 1976, 1980, 1984, 1988, 1992, 1996	Pistol
6	Nasser Al-Attiyah	Qatar	1996, 2000, 2004, 2008, 2012, 2016	Shotgun
6	Fehaid Aldeehani	Kuwait	1992, 1996, 2000, 2004, 2012, 2016	Shotgun
6	Abdullah Alrashidi	Kuwait	1996, 2000, 2004, 2008, 2012, 2016	Shotgun
6	Sorin Babii	Romania	1984, 1988, 1992, 1996, 2000, 2004	Pistol
6	Andrea Benelli	Italy	1988, 1992, 1996, 2000, 2004, 2008	Shotgun
6	Michael Diamond	Australia	1992, 1996, 2000, 2004, 2008, 2012	Shotgun
6	Franck Dumoulin	France	1992, 1996, 2000, 2004, 2008, 2012	Pistol
6	Thomas Farnik	Austria	1992, 1996, 2000, 2004, 2008, 2012	Rifle
6	Juan Giha	Peru	1980, 1984, 1988, 1992, 1996, 2000	Shotgun
6	Juha Hirvi	Finland	1988, 1992, 1996, 2000, 2004, 2008	Rifle
6	Tanyu Kiriakov	Bulgaria	1988, 1992, 1996, 2000, 2004, 2008	Pistol
6	Kanstantsin Lukashyk	Belarus Unified Team	1992, 1996, 2000, 2004, 2008, 2012	Pistol
6	Russell Mark	Australia	1988, 1992, 1996, 2000, 2008, 2012	Shotgun
6	Sergei Martynov	Belarus Soviet Union	1988, 1996, 2000, 2004, 2008, 2012	Rifle
6	William McMillan	United States	1952, 1960, 1964, 1968, 1972, 1976	Pistol
6	Emil Milev	United States Bulgaria	1992, 1996, 2000, 2004, 2012, 2016	Pistol
6	Stevan Pletikosic	Serbia Serbia and Montenegro Yugoslavia	1992, 1996, 2000, 2004, 2008, 2016	Rifle
6	John Primrose	Canada	1968, 1972, 1976, 1984, 1988, 1992	Shotgun
6	Adam Smelczynski	Poland	1956, 1960, 1964, 1968, 1972, 1976	Shotgun
6	Harald Stenvaag	Norway	1984, 1988, 1992, 1996, 2000, 2004	Rifle
6	Eric Swinkels	Netherlands	1972, 1976, 1984, 1988, 1992, 1996	Shotgun
6	Guillermo Alfredo Torres	Cuba	1980, 1992, 1996, 2000, 2004, 2012	Shotgun
6	Yifu Wang	China	1984, 1988, 1992, 1996, 2000, 2004	Pistol

== See also ==
- Biathlon at the Winter Olympics
- Military patrol at the Winter Olympics
- ISSF World Shooting Championships
- List of Olympic venues in shooting
- Shooting at the Summer Paralympics
- Modern pentathlon at the Summer Olympics
