= Shooting at the 1912 Summer Olympics – Men's 50 metre pistol =

Olympic shooting event

Men's 50 metre pistol at the Games of the V Olympiad
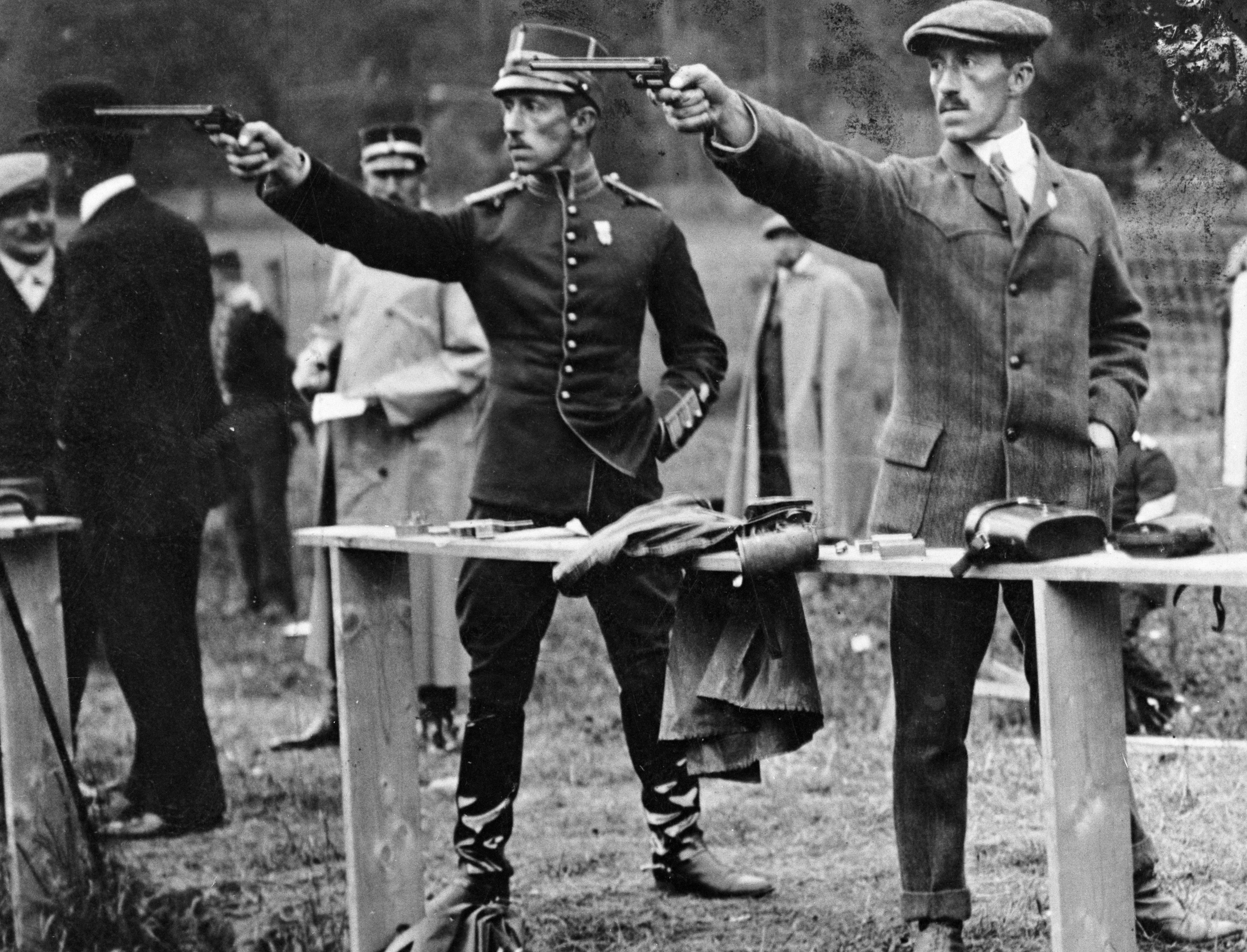
- Shooting at the 1912 Summer Olympics
- Venue: Kaknäs
- Date: 1 July 1912
- Competitors: 54 from 12 nations
- Winning score: 499

Medalists
1st place, gold medalist(s)		Alfred Lane; United States
2nd place, silver medalist(s)		Peter Dolfen; United States
3rd place, bronze medalist(s)		Charles Stewart; Great Britain

The men's individual competition with revolver and pistol, distance 50 metres (later standardized by the IOC to the men's 50 metre pistol) was a shooting sports event held as part of the shooting at the 1912 Summer Olympics programme. It was the fourth appearance of the event, which was the only one to have been featured at every edition of the Games to that point. The competition was held on Monday, 1 July 1912. Fifty-four sport shooters from twelve nations competed. Nations were limited to 12 shooters each. The event was won by Alfred Lane of the United States, completing a double for him with the rapid fire pistol event. It was the United States' second victory in the event. Another American, Peter Dolfen, finished second. Charles Stewart of Great Britain took the bronze medal, the nation's first in the free pistol.

== Background ==
This was the fourth appearance of what would become standardised as the men's ISSF 50 meter pistol event. The event was held at every Summer Olympics from 1896 to 1920 (except 1904, when no shooting events were held) and from 1936 to 2016; it was open to women from 1968 to 1980. 1896 and 1908 were the only Games in which the distance was not 50 metres; the former used 30 metres and the latter 50 yards.

Of the top ten shooters in 1908, only two returned: ninth-place finisher John Dietz of the United States and tenth-place finisher André Regaud of France.

Austria, Chile, Finland, Germany, Hungary, and Russia each made their debut in the event. France, Greece, and the United States each made their third appearance, tied for most of any nation.

Lane used a Smith & Wesson Perfected Model Third Model.

== Competition format ==
The competition had each shooter fire 60 shots, in 10 series of 6 shots each, at a distance of 50 metres. The time allowed for each series was 4 minutes. The target was round, 50 centimetres in diameter, with 10 scoring rings. Scoring for each shot was up to 10 points, in increments of 1 point. The maximum score possible was 600 points. Ties were broken by countback (10s, 9s, 8s, etc.). Any revolver or pistol could be used; only open sights were allowed. Any ammunition with a metal cartridge case could be used. Pistols with hairspring triggers, allowed in the world championship, were banned.

== Records ==
Prior to this competition, the existing world and Olympic records were as follows.

World record				
Olympic record	Karl Röderer (SUI)	503	Paris, France	1 August 1900

No new world or Olympic records were set during the competition.

== Schedule ==
Date	Time	Round
Monday, 1 July 1912	12:00	Final

== Results ==
Stewart shot more 10s than de Laval, winning the bronze medal on that tie-breaker.

Rank	Shooter	Nation	Score
1st place, gold medalist(s)	Alfred Lane	United States	499
2nd place, silver medalist(s)	Peter Dolfen	United States	474
3rd place, bronze medalist(s)	Charles Stewart	Great Britain	470
4	Georg de Laval	Sweden	470
5	Erik Boström	Sweden	468
6	Horatio Poulter	Great Britain	461
7	Harry Sears	United States	459
8	Nikolai Panin-Kolomenkin	Russian Empire	457
9	John Dietz	United States	454
10	Léon Johnson	France	454
11	Ivan Törnmarck	Sweden	453
12	Eric Carlberg	Sweden	452
13	Reginald Sayre	United States	452
14	Lars Madsen	Denmark	452
15	André Regaud	France	447
16	Vilhelm Carlberg	Sweden	446
17	Grigori Panteleimonov	Russian Empire	442
18	Ioannis Theofilakis	Greece	441
19	Dmitry Kuskov	Russian Empire	438
20	Hugh Durant	Great Britain	433
21	Laurits Larsen	Denmark	432
22	Hans Roedder	United States	431
23	Harald Ekwall	Chile	430
24	Albert Kempster	Great Britain	426
25	Fredrik Nyström	Sweden	426
26	Frangiskos Mavrommatis	Greece	425
27	Sándor Török	Hungary	424
28	Heikki Huttunen	Finland	424
29	Robert Löfman	Sweden	423
30	Konstantinos Skarlatos	Greece	420
31	Grigori Shesterikov	Russian Empire	420
32	Peter Jones	Great Britain	417
33	Nikolai Melnitsky	Russian Empire	414
34	Pavel Voyloshnikov	Russian Empire	413
35	William McClure	Great Britain	411
36	Paul Palén	Sweden	410
37	Gideon Ericsson	Sweden	408
38	Félix Alegría	Chile	406
39	Adolf Schmal	Austria	406
40	Frants Nielsen	Denmark	406
41	Niels Larsen	Denmark	405
42	Gustaf Boivie	Sweden	401
43	Peter Nielsen	Denmark	397
44	Gerhard Bock	Germany	395
45	Edward Tickell	Great Britain	387
46	Amos Kash	Russian Empire	384
47	Alexandros Theofilakis	Greece	369
48	Gustaf Stiernspetz	Sweden	357
49	Walter W. Winans	United States	356
50	Anders Peter Nielsen	Denmark	355
51	Hugo Cederschiöld	Sweden	352
52	Zoltán Jelenffy	Hungary	348
53	Edmond Bernhardt	Austria	245
54	Heinrich Hoffmann	Germany	189
