= Shooting at the 1912 Summer Olympics – Men's 30 metre team rapid fire pistol =

Olympic shooting event

Men's 30 metre team dueling pistol at the Games of the V Olympiad
- Venue: Kaknäs
- Dates: 29 June to 3 July 1912
- Competitors: 28 from 7 nations

Medalists
1st place, gold medalist(s)		Sweden; Eric Carlberg, Vilhelm Carlberg, Johan Hübner von Holst, Paul Palén
2nd place, silver medalist(s)		Russian Empire; Amos Kash, Nikolai Melnitsky, Grigori Panteleimonov, Pavel Voyloshnikov
3rd place, bronze medalist(s)		Great Britain; Hugh Durant, Albert Kempster, Horatio Poulter, Charles Stewart

The men's 30 metre team dueling pistol (originally called team competition with revolver and pistol (duel shooting)) was a shooting sports event held as part of the 1912 Summer Olympics shooting programme. The competition was held from Saturday, 29 June 1912 to Wednesday, 3 July 1912.

Twenty-eight sport shooters from seven nations competed.

== Medalists ==
Gold	Silver	Bronze
Sweden; Eric Carlberg; Vilhelm Carlberg; Johan Hübner von Holst; Paul Palén	Russian Empire; Amos Kash; Nikolai Melnitsky; Grigori Panteleimonov; Pavel Voyloshnikov	Great Britain; Hugh Durant; Albert Kempster; Horatio Poulter; Charles Stewart

== Results ==
Place	Team	Ind. score	Team hits (score)
1	Sweden		120 (1145)
1	Eric Carlberg	290	120 (1145)
1	Vilhelm Carlberg	287	120 (1145)
1	Johan Hübner von Holst	284	120 (1145)
1	Paul Palén	284	120 (1145)
2	Russian Empire		118 (1091)
2	Amos Kash	281	118 (1091)
2	Nikolai Melnitsky	273	118 (1091)
2	Pavel Voyloshnikov	270	118 (1091)
2	Grigori Panteleimonov	267	118 (1091)
3	Great Britain		117 (1107)
3	Hugh Durant	289	117 (1107)
3	Albert Kempster	285	117 (1107)
3	Charles Stewart	284	117 (1107)
3	Horatio Poulter	249	117 (1107)
4	United States		117 (1097)
4	Alfred Lane	292	117 (1097)
4	Reginald Sayre	273	117 (1097)
4	Walter Winans	271	117 (1097)
4	John Dietz	261	117 (1097)
5	Greece		115 (1057)
5	Konstantinos Skarlatos	283	115 (1057)
5	Ioannis Theofilakis	275	115 (1057)
5	Frangiskos Mavrommatis	273	115 (1057)
5	Georgios Petropoulos	226	115 (1057)
6	France		113 (1041)
6	Edmond Sandoz	285	113 (1041)
6	Charles de Jaubert	275	113 (1041)
6	Georges de Crequi-Montfort	259	113 (1041)
6	Maurice Fauré	222	113 (1041)
7	Germany		102 (890)
7	Benno Wandolleck	256	102 (890)
7	Gerhard Bock	233	102 (890)
7	Georg Meyer	216	102 (890)
7	Heinrich Hoffmann	195	102 (890)
