= Shooting at the 1912 Summer Olympics – Men's 30 metre rapid fire pistol =

Olympic shooting event

Men's 30 metre dueling pistol at the Games of the V Olympiad
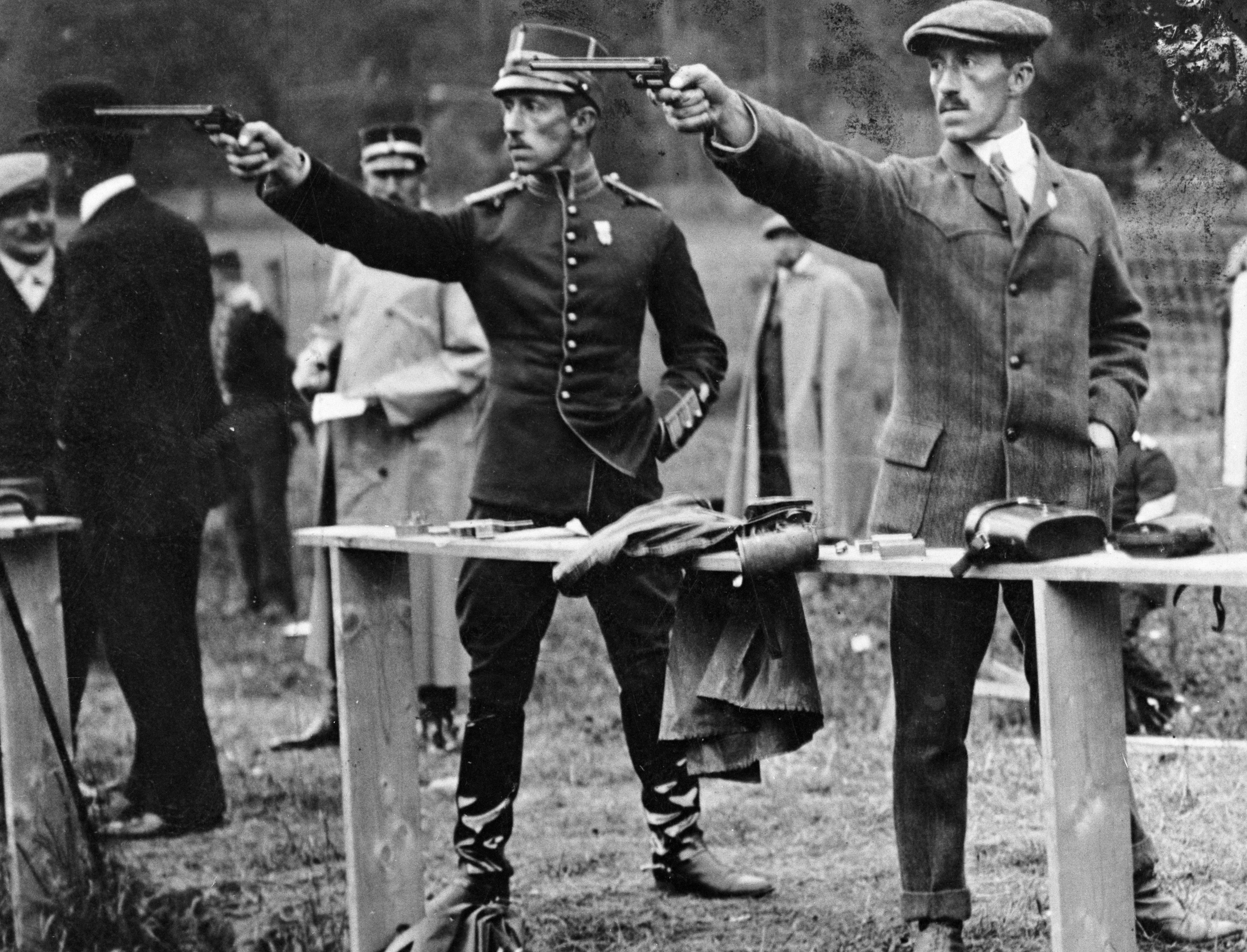
- Shooting at the 1912 Summer Olympics
- Venue: Kaknäs
- Date: 29 June
- Competitors: 42 from 10 nations
- Winning score: 30 hits, 287 points

Medalists
1st place, gold medalist(s)		Alfred Lane; United States
2nd place, silver medalist(s)		Paul Palén; Sweden
3rd place, bronze medalist(s)		Johan Hübner von Holst; Sweden

The men's 30-metre (98 ft) dueling pistol (originally called individual competition with revolver and pistol (duel shooting)) was a shooting sports pistol event held as part of the 1912 Summer Olympics shooting programme. It was later standardized by the ISSF to the men's 25 metre rapid fire pistol. It was the third appearance of the event (fourth counting 1906), as it had not been featured at the 1908 Games. The competition was held on Saturday, 29 June 1912. Forty-two sport shooters from ten nations competed. Nations were limited to 12 shooters each. The event was won by Alfred Lane of the United States, in the nation's debut. Sweden, also making its debut, earned the silver (Paul Palén) and bronze (Johan Hübner von Holst) medals.

== Background ==
This was the third appearance of what would become standardised as the men's ISSF 25 meter rapid fire pistol event, the only event on the 2020 programme that traces back to 1896. The event has been held at every Summer Olympics except 1904 and 1928 (when no shooting events were held) and 1908; it was open to women from 1968 to 1980. The 1912 event was very different from both the 1896 event and the 1900 event, which were also quite different from each other. Standardization would come in 1924.

France, Great Britain, and Greece each made their second appearance in the event; each of the other seven nations (Austria, Chile, Germany, Hungary, Russia, Sweden, and the United States) was competing for the first time.

== Competition format ==
The format was 30 shots in 6 series of 5 shots each. The target was a 1.7-metre-tall (5.6 ft) full silhouette, with scoring rings up to 10 points. The figure would appear for 3 seconds, with 10 seconds between each shot. 30 hits were possible, with 300 points possible. Hits were the primary measurement of success; points were only used to differentiate between shooters with the same number of hits. Any revolver or pistol could be used, with open fore- and back-sights.

== Schedule ==
Date	Time	Round
Saturday, 29 June 1912	9:00	Final

== Results ==
A shoot-off was used to determine the bronze medal after two men tied on hits (30) and points (283). Hübner von Holst beat Dietz 284 to 282. Tie-breaking procedures for later ties are not known.

Rank	Shooter	Nation	Hits	Score
1st place, gold medalist(s)	Alfred Lane	United States	30	287
2nd place, silver medalist(s)	Paul Palén	Sweden	30	286
3rd place, bronze medalist(s)	Johan Hübner von Holst	Sweden	30	283
4	John Dietz	United States	30	283
5	Ivan Törnmarck	Sweden	30	280
6	Eric Carlberg	Sweden	30	278
7	Georg de Laval	Sweden	30	277
8	Walter W. Winans	United States	30	276
9	Sándor Török	Hungary	30	275
10	Hans Roedder	United States	30	275
11	Gustaf Boivie	Sweden	30	272
12	Edmond Sandoz	France	30	272
13	Patrik de Laval	Sweden	30	268
14	Grigori Panteleimonov	Russian Empire	30	265
15	Vilhelm Carlberg	Sweden	29	274
16	Peter Dolfen	United States	29	274
17	Erik Boström	Sweden	29	274
18	Franz-Albert Schartau	Sweden	29	270
19	Reginald Sayre	United States	29	268
20	Adolf Schmal	Austria	29	267
21	Harry Sears	United States	29	266
22	Nikolai Melnitsky	Russian Empire	29	264
23	Ioannis Theofilakis	Greece	29	263
24	Pavel Voyloshnikov	Russian Empire	29	260
25	Félix Alegría	Chile	29	259
26	Georges de Crequi-Montfort	France	28	263
27	Konstantinos Skarlatos	Greece	28	261
28	Amos Kash	Russian Empire	28	260
29	Frangiskos Mavrommatis	Greece	28	258
30	Axel Gyllenkrok	Sweden	28	255
31	Maurice Fauré	France	28	250
32	Grigori Shesterikov	Russian Empire	28	250
33	Alexandros Theofilakis	Greece	27	242
34	Nikolaos Levidis	Greece	27	231
35	Anastasios Metaxas	Greece	26	232
36	Charles de Jaubert	France	26	229
37	Hugo Cederschiöld	Sweden	26	225
38	Harald Ekwall	Chile	25	217
39	Georg Meyer	Germany	25	207
40	Edmond Bernhardt	Austria	25	194
41	William McClure	Great Britain	23	180
42	Henri de Castex	France	17	140
