= Pistol dueling at the Summer Olympics =

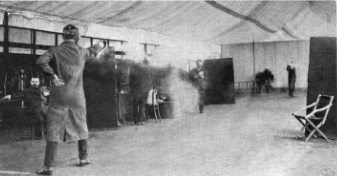
Dueling at the 1908 Olympics involved wax bullets and elaborate protection

Pistol dueling was a sport at the 1906 Intercalated Games and 1908 Olympics.

== History ==
In the 1906 Intercalated Games, competitors fired duelling pistols at plaster dummies from distances of 20 m (22 yd) and 30 m (33 yd).

In 1908, pistol dueling was demonstrated as part of the concurrent Franco-British Exhibition, using the Olympic fencing arena and in front of invited guests. There were no official demonstration sports until 1912. The competition involved two competitors firing at each other with dueling pistols loaded with wax bullets and wearing protective equipment for the torso, face, and hands. Teams were sent by countries including France, the UK, and the USA. The 20-meter competition was won by the French team of Major Ferrus, J Marais and J Rouvcanachi.

== 1906 medal summary ==
Event	Gold	Silver	Bronze
20 m duelling pistol	Léon Moreaux (FRA)	Cesare Liverziani (ITA)	Maurice Lecoq (FRA)
30 m duelling pistol	Konstantinos Skarlatos (GRE)	Johan Hübner von Holst (SWE)	Vilhelm Carlberg (SWE)

== See also ==
- Pigeon racing at the 1900 Summer Olympics
- Pigeon shooting at the Olympics
