= Ivan Törnmarck =

Swedish sport shooter

Personal information
- Born: 25 January 1885 Vivstavarv, Sweden
- Died: 17 April 1963 (aged 78) Askersund, Sweden

Sport
- Sport: Sports shooting

Curt Ivan Törnmarck (25 January 1885 – 17 April 1963) was a Swedish sport shooter who competed in the 1912 Summer Olympics. In 1912 he finished fifth in the 30 metre rapid fire pistol competition and eleventh in the 50 metre pistol event.
