= William Marsden (sport shooter) =

British sport shooter

Personal information
- Born: 24 November 1860 Southport, England
- Died: 10 May 1942 (aged 81) Sleaford, Lincolnshire, England

Sport
- Sport: Sports shooting
Medal record
Men's shooting
Representing United Kingdom
Olympic Games
Bronze medal – third place	1908 London	Moving target

William Marsden (24 November 1860 – 10 May 1942) was a British sports shooter. He competed at the 1908 Summer Olympics winning a bronze medal in the moving target small-bore rifle event.
