= Shooting at the 1908 Summer Olympics – Men's moving target small-bore rifle =

Sports shooting at the Olympics

Men's moving target small-bore rifle at the Games of the IV Olympiad
- Venue: Bisley rifle range
- Date: 11 July 1908
- Competitors: 22 from 5 nations

Medalists
1st place, gold medalist(s)		John Fleming	Great Britain
2nd place, silver medalist(s)		Maurice Matthews	Great Britain
3rd place, bronze medalist(s)		William Marsden	Great Britain

The men's moving target small-bore rifle was one of 15 events on the Shooting at the 1908 Summer Olympics programme. Regulation of the equipment used in the event was done through allowing the use of .22 LR or .297/.230 caliber ammunition. Magnifying and telescopic sights were prohibited. The target used was a three-quarter length silhouette, 10 cm (4 in) high and 3.8 cm (1.5 in) wide. It would appear at a distance of 23 m (25 yd), moving across a 3 m (10 ft) range over the course of 4 seconds. A hit on the upper two-thirds of the figure counted for 3 points, while any other hit counted for 1 point. 15 shots were fired per competitor. The maximum score was thus 45 points. Each nation could enter up to 12 shooters.

== Results ==
Place	Shooter	Score
1	John Fleming (GBR)	24
2	Maurice Matthews (GBR)	24
3	William Marsden (GBR)	24
4	Edward Newitt (GBR)	24
5	Philip Plater (GBR)	22
6	William Pimm (GBR)	21
7	William Milne (GBR)	21
8	Otto von Rosen (SWE)	18
9	William Styles (GBR)	17
10	Léon Johnson (FRA)	13
10	Arthur Wilde (GBR)	13
10	Walter W. Winans (USA)	13
13	James Milne (GBR)	12
14	André Mercier (FRA)	10
15	Eric Carlberg (SWE)	9
15	Vilhelm Carlberg (SWE)	9
15	Johan Hübner von Holst (SWE)	9
15	Léon Tétart (FRA)	9
19	Edward Amoore (GBR)	3
19	Harold Hawkins (GBR)	3
—	William Hill (ANZ)	Did not finish
—	Franz-Albert Schartau (SWE)	Did not finish

== Sources ==
- Cook, Theodore Andrea (1908). The Fourth Olympiad, Being the Official Report. London: British Olympic Association.
- De Wael, Herman (2001). "Shooting 1908". Herman's Full Olympians.
