= Georg Meyer (sport shooter) =

German sports shooter

Personal information
- Born: 24 December 1868 Hannover, Kingdom of Prussia

Sport
- Sport: Sports shooting

Georg Hermann Meyer (born 24 December 1868, date of death unknown) was a German sport shooter who competed on the German team in the 1912 Summer Olympics that finished seventh in the 30 metre team military pistol competition. In the 30 metre rapid fire pistol event he finished 39th.

== Sources ==
- "Georg Meyer". Sports Reference. 2008. Archived from the original on 11 April 2011.
- "Germany at the 1912 Stockholm Summer Games". Sports Reference. 2008. Archived from the original on 7 November 2009.
