= Heinrich Hoffmann (sport shooter) =

German sports shooter

Personal information
- Born: 20 February 1869 Sagan, Kingdom of Prussia
- Died: 15 October 1932 (aged 63) Berlin, Germany

Sport
- Sport: Sports shooting

Heinrich Hoffmann (20 February 1869 – 15 October 1932) was a German sport shooter who competed in the 1912 Summer Olympics. In 1912 he was a member of the German team which finished seventh in the 30 metre team military pistol competition. In the 50 metre pistol event he finished 54th.
