= Georges de Crequi-Montfort =

French sport shooter and anthropologist

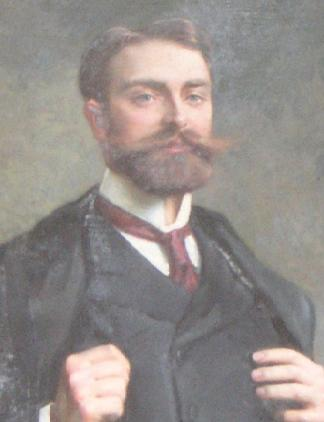

Personal information
- Born: 27 September 1877 Sainte-Adresse, France
- Died: 4 April 1966 (aged 88) Neuilly-sur-Seine, France

Sport
- Sport: Sport shooting

Henri Georges Le Compasseur de Créqui-Montfort Marquis de Courtivron (27 September 1877 – 4 April 1966) was a French explorer, anthropologist, diplomat, businessman and sport shooter who competed in the 1912 Summer Olympics and in the 1924 Summer Olympics.

== Personal life ==
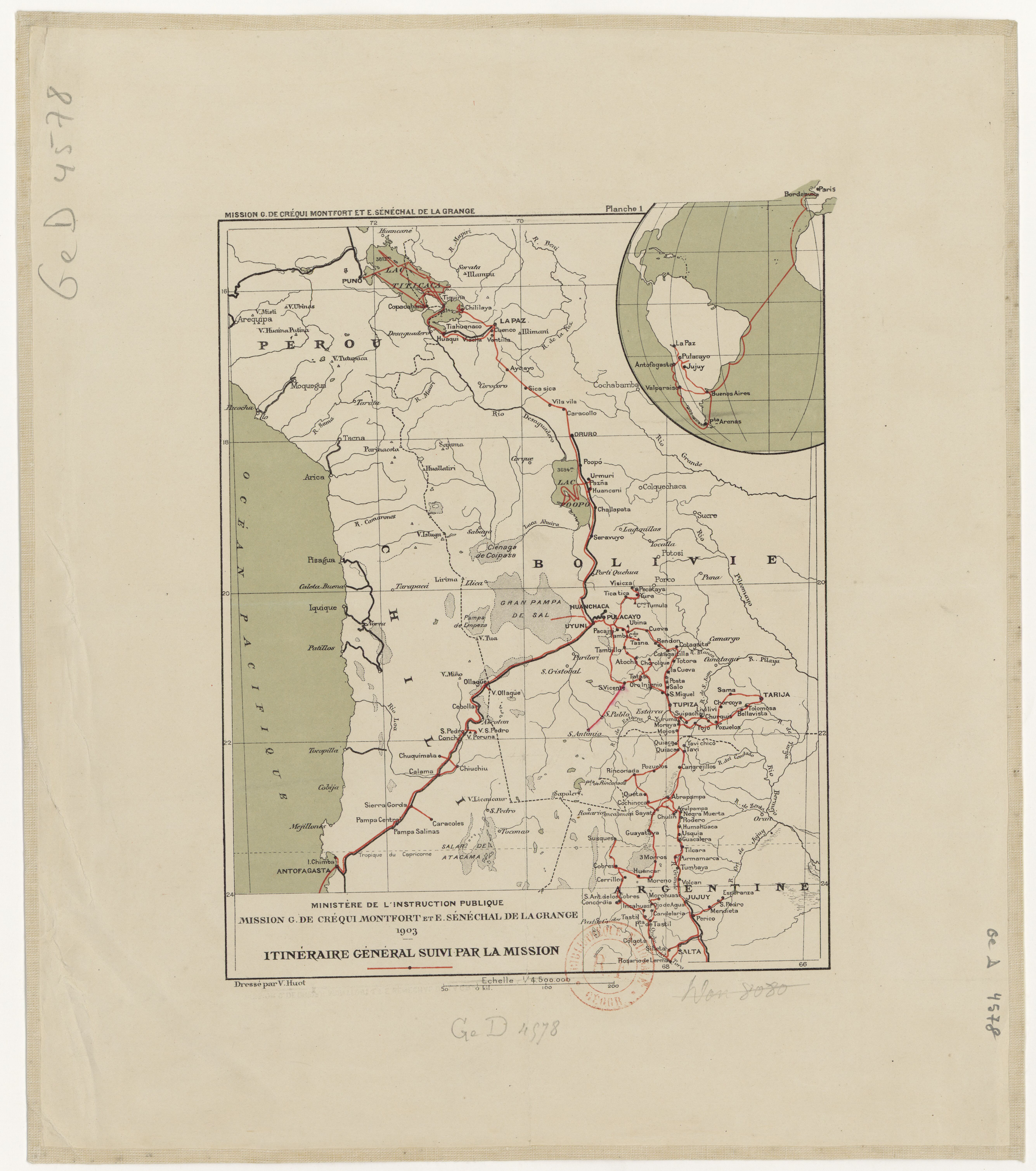
Map of the Ministry of Public Education sponsored Mission G. de Créqui-Montfort & E. Sénéchal de la Grange in Bolivia, Argentina, Chile and Peru (1903)

He was born in Sainte-Adresse, Normandy. His mother Eugénie Fiocre was a ballerina, principal at Opera Garnier in Paris. His father, Stanislas Le Compasseur de Créqui-Montfort Marquis de Courtivron, was a landlord and aristocrat.

== Sport career ==
In 1912, he was a member of the French team which finished sixth in the team clay pigeons event. In the individual trap competition he finished 35th. He was also a member of the French team, which finished sixth in the team 30 metre dueling pistol event. In the 30 metre rapid fire pistol competition, he finished 26th. Twelve years later, he finished 21st in the 25 metre rapid fire pistol event.

== Publications ==
Rapport sur une mission scientifique en Amerique du Sud (Bolivie, Republique Argentine, Chili, Perou) par M. de Crequi Montfort et Senechal de la Grange (1904)
