= Zoltán Jelenffy =

Hungarian sports shooter

Personal information
- Born: 26 October 1876 Sighetu Marmaţiei, Austria-Hungary
- Died: 21 January 1924 (aged 47)

Sport
- Sport: Sports shooting

Zoltán Jelenffy (26 October 1876 – 21 January 1924) was a Hungarian sports shooter. He competed in four events at the 1912 Summer Olympics.

Jelenffy was a military officer and served in the Royal Hungarian Army. He was also a top sportsman, competing in gymnastics, swimming, cycling, cross-country skiing, and sports shooting. He was reported to have "brought glory to the Hungarian name in rifle and pistol target shooting".

He died by suicide in 1924.
