= Eric Carlberg =

Swedish Army officer and sportsman

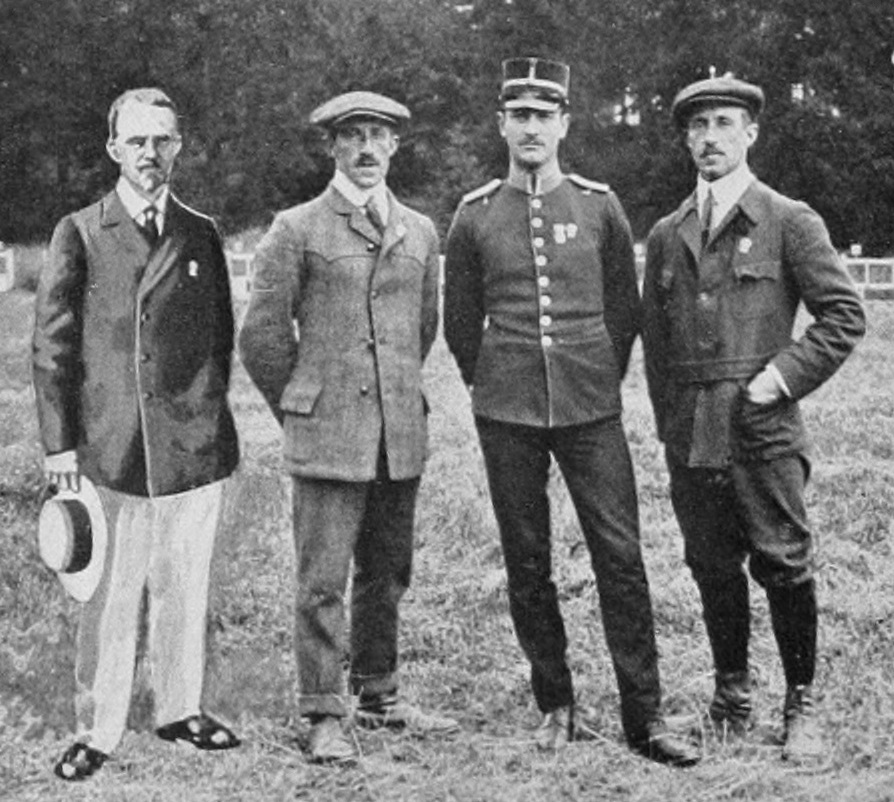
- Carlberg (right) at the 1912 Olympics

Personal information
- Full name: Gustaf Eric Carlberg
- Nationality: Swedish
- Born: 5 April 1880 Karlskrona, Sweden
- Died: 14 August 1963 (aged 83) Stockholm, Sweden
- Height: 175 cm (5 ft 9 in)

Sport
- Country: Sweden
- Sport: Shooting, fencing, modern pentathlon
- Club: Stockholms AF (1906 and 1908, shooting); Stockholms PK (1912, shooting); FOK, Stockholm (1924, shooting); FFF, Stockholm (fencing); I26 IF, Vaxholm (pentathlon)
Medal record
Men's shooting
Representing Sweden
Olympic Games
Gold medal – first place	1912 Stockholm	Team 25 m small-bore rifle
Gold medal – first place	1912 Stockholm	Team 30 m military pistol
Silver medal – second place	1908 London	Team small-bore rifle
Silver medal – second place	1912 Stockholm	Team 50 m small-bore rifle
Silver medal – second place	1912 Stockholm	Team 50 m military pistol

Gustaf Eric Carlberg (5 April 1880 – 14 August 1963) was a Swedish Army officer, diplomat, sport shooter, fencer, and modern pentathlete who competed at the 1906, 1908, 1912 and 1924 Olympics alongside his twin brother Vilhelm.

== Biography ==
Eric and Vilhelm were the youngest of four children of a veterinarian, who died when they were 12 years old. The twins became military officers in 1901 and retired with the rank of major. In 1911, they became physical education instructors. In 1924, Eric married Elsa Lindell and was stationed for three years in Iran as part of the newly established Iranian Gendarmerie corps. In 1930, he was appointed Swedish consul general in Tehran and, between 1935 and 1958, served as the Finnish consul general there.

== Olympic career ==
1906 Athens

- 25 m rapid fire pistol – eleventh place
- 30 m duelling pistol – 13th place
- 20 m duelling pistol – 14th place
- 50 m pistol – 18th place
- 25 m army pistol (1873 model) – 18th place
- 25 m army pistol (standard model) – 27th place
- 300 m army rifle – 28th place
- Free rifle, free position – 29th place

1908 London

Carlberg was a member of the Swedish team that won the silver medal in the team small-bore rifle competition. He also participated in the following shooting events:

- Team pistol – fifth place
- disappearing target small-bore rifle – ninth place
- moving target small-bore rifle – 15th place
- individual pistol – 33rd place

He also participated in the épée competition but was eliminated in the first round. As a member of the Swedish épée team, he was eliminated in the first round of the team épée event.

1912 Stockholm

At the 1912 Summer Olympics, he won two gold and two silver medals in shooting. He also participated in the following shooting events:

- 30 metre rapid fire pistol – sixth place
- 50 metre pistol – twelfth place
- 50 metre rifle, prone – 17th place
- 25 metre small-bore rifle – 20th place

As a member of the Swedish épée team, he finished fourth in the team épée competition.

He also participated in the modern pentathlon event but retired after the first contest. This was the shooting competition where he finished eighth.

1924 Paris

In 1924, he finished ninth in the 25 metre rapid fire pistol event.

== See also ==
- Dual sport and multi-sport Olympians
