= Fredrik Nyström =

Swedish sports shooter

Personal information
- Born: 17 July 1880 Gotland, Sweden
- Died: 13 February 1967 (aged 86) Slite, Sweden

Sport
- Sport: Sports shooting

Fredrik Nyström (17 July 1880 – 13 February 1967) was a Swedish sports shooter. He competed in two events at the 1912 Summer Olympics.
