= William McMillan (sport shooter) =

American sport shooter

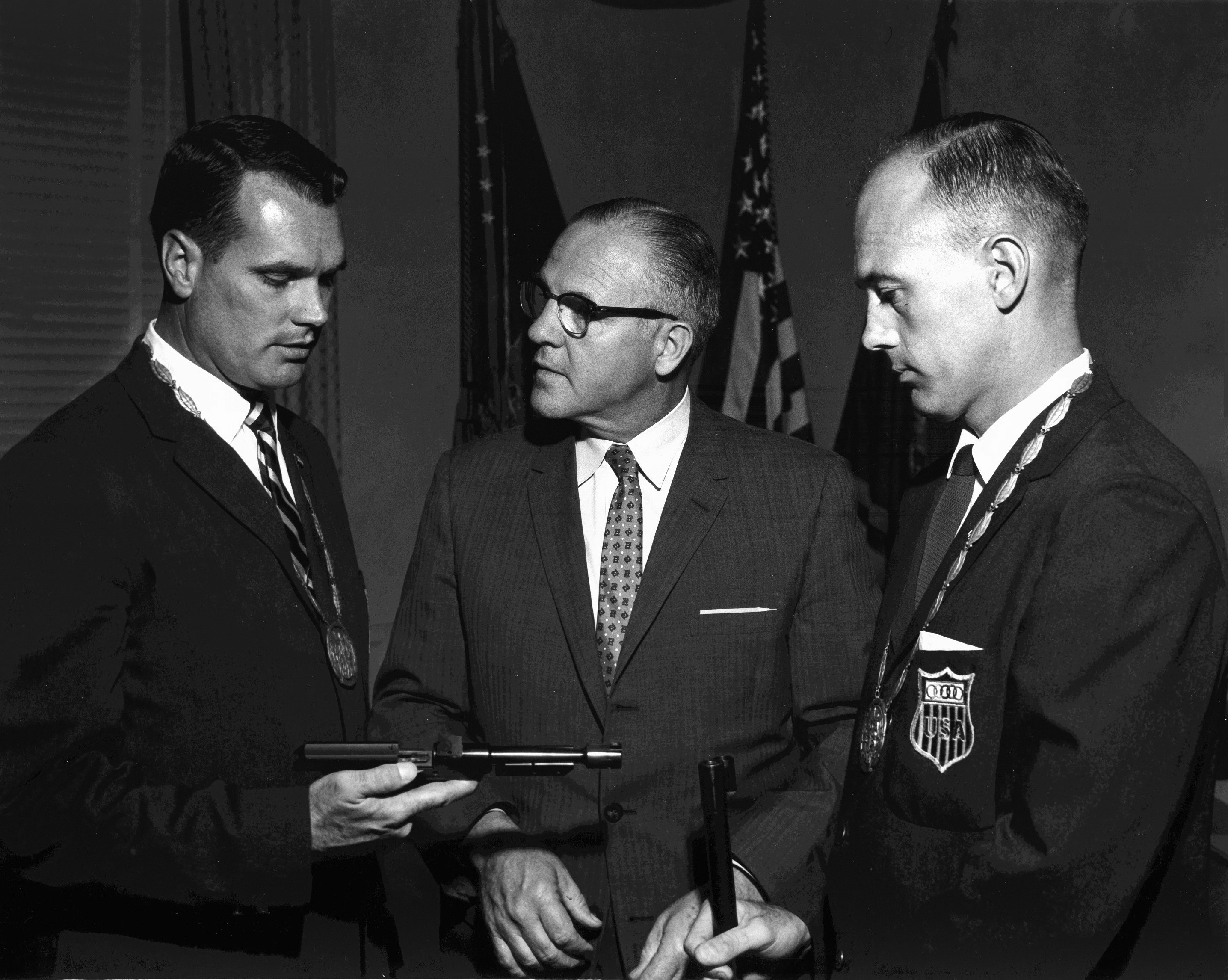
- McMillan (left) and James Enoch Hill (right) are commended by David M. Shoup, Commandant of the Marine Corps. McMillan holds the pistol he used at the 1960 Olympics.

Personal information
- Born: January 29, 1929 Frostburg, Maryland, United States
- Died: June 6, 2000 (aged 71) Encinitas, California, United States
- Height: 1.83 m (6 ft 0 in)
- Weight: 91 kg (201 lb)

Sport
- Sport: Shooting
- Club: US Marine Corps
Medal record
Men's shooting
Representing the United States
Olympic Games
Gold medal – first place	1960 Rome	25 m rapid-fire pistol
World Championships
Gold medal – first place	1952 Oslo	25 m rapid fire pistol, team
Silver medal – second place	1954 Caracas	25 m rapid fire pistol, team
Silver medal – second place	1954 Caracas	25 m rapid fire pistol
Silver medal – second place	1958 Moscow	25 m rapid fire pistol, team
Silver medal – second place	1962 Cairo	25 m rapid fire pistol, team
Pan American Games
Gold medal – first place	1955 Mexico City	25 m rapid fire pistol, team
Gold medal – first place	1955 Mexico City	25 m center fire pistol, team
Gold medal – first place	1963 São Paulo	25 m rapid fire pistol, team
Gold medal – first place	1967 Winnipeg	25 m rapid fire pistol
Gold medal – first place	1967 Winnipeg	25 m rapid fire pistol, team
Silver medal – second place	1955 Mexico City	25 m rapid fire pistol
Silver medal – second place	1955 Mexico City	25 m center fire pistol
Silver medal – second place	1979 San Juan	25 m rapid fire pistol
Silver medal – second place	1979 San Juan	25 m rapid fire pistol, team

William Willard McMillan (January 29, 1929 – June 6, 2000) was an American sport shooter. Competing in ISSF 25 meter rapid fire pistol, he won an Olympic gold medal in 1960, was part of the American winning team at the 1952 World Championships, and won several gold and silver medals at the Pan American Games between 1955 and 1979.

== Biography ==
McMillan was born in Frostburg, Maryland. He attended Turtle Creek High School in Pennsylvania. His professional career began in the United States Marine Corps, with McMillan eventually reaching the rank of lieutenant colonel. After his retirement, he served as sheriff in San Diego County, California. He died in Encinitas, California, on June 6, 2000.

== Sport shooting ==
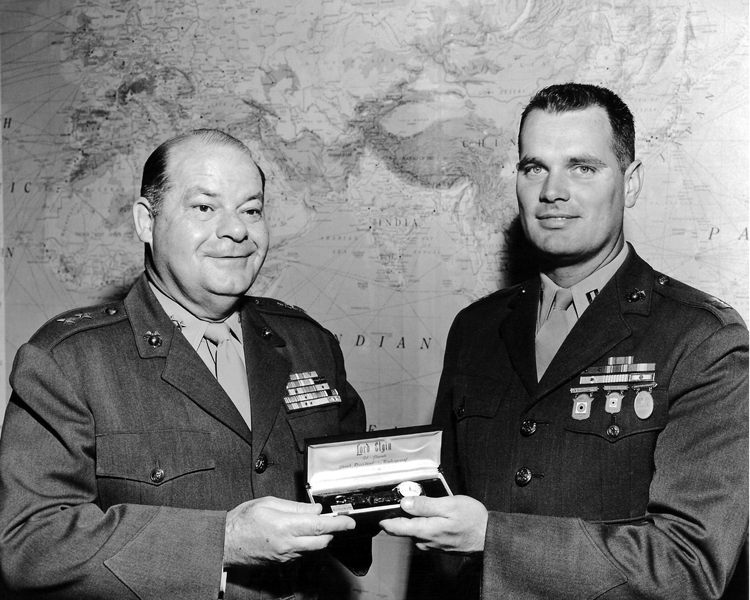
Thomas A. Wornham (MCRD San Diego) decorating William W. McMillan with Elgin Wrist Watches for 1957 National Rifle and Pistol Matches.

Between 1952 and 1976, he competed in the 25 m rapid fire pistol event in six Olympics, missing only the 1956 Games due to malfunctioning of his weapon during the US trials. He won a gold medal at the 1960 Summer Olympics in Rome and competed at five other Olympic Games.

McMillan won one world, five Pan American, and four national titles in the rapid fire pistol and free pistol events, as well as several silver medals at all these competitions, the last two aged 50. In his career, he set two world shooting records.

In 1994, USA Shooting inducted him into the USA Shooting Hall of Fame.

== Military service ==
William Willard McMillan
- Military career
- Allegiance: United States
- Branch: United States Marine Corps
- Service years: 1946-1974
- Rank: Lieutenant Colonel
- Nickname: "Bill"
- Conflicts: Korean War; Vietnam War
- Awards
- Other work: Deputy Sheriff

McMillan enlisted in the United States Marine Corps in 1946. He was commissioned a second lieutenant in 1953 and retired as a lieutenant colonel in 1974. He served in the Korean and Vietnam wars.

From 1974 to 1981, he worked as a Weapons Training Coordinator at San Diego County, California, where he was injured in a shooting accident at the old Camp Elliot range.

In 1978, the Marine Corps established the McMillan Trophy for sports shooting in his honor.

=== Military awards ===

- Distinguished Pistol Shot, June 16, 1950
- Distinguished Marksman, June 3, 1954
- Distinguished International Shooter, May 23, 1963

== See also ==
- List of athletes with the most appearances at Olympic Games
