= Reginald Sayre =

American orthopedic surgeon and sport shooter (1859–1929)

Reginald Hall Sayre
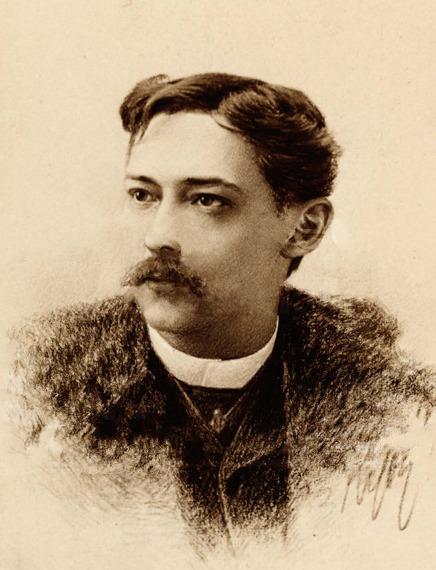
- Sayre in 1884
- Born: October 15, 1859; New York City, US
- Died: May 29, 1929 (aged 69); New York City, US
- Education: Columbia University
- Known for: Orthopedic surgery, shooting sports

Reginald Hall Sayre (October 15, 1859 – May 29, 1929) was a prominent American orthopedic surgeon and Olympic sport shooter.

== Biography ==
Sayre was born to Eliza Ann Hall, an artist and Lewis Albert Sayre, the leading American orthopedic surgeon. He studied at the Churchill & Maury School and Columbia College, graduating in 1881. Two of his elder brothers went into medicine after the father, and thus, Reginald initially thought of becoming a lawyer. However, his brother Lewis persuaded him to follow the family tradition and enter the Bellevue Hospital Medical College in 1881. After graduation in 1884, he worked as an assistant to Hermann Biggs and then joined the practice of his brother Lewis. Later, he began helping his father teach at a college.

Sayre started his research from an early age and published most of his papers at a young age. Just seven months after completing his internship, he presented before the New York Academy of Medicine a report on "The Immediate Restoration of Parts to the Normal Position after Tenotomy," where he boldly questioned well-accepted procedures.

Throughout his life, Sayre mostly worked as a surgeon at the Bellevue and St. Vincent's Hospitals. From 1899 until his death, he was Professor of Orthopedic Surgery at Bellevue, where he succeeded his father as head of the Orthopedic Department. He was also consulting surgeon at Hackensack (1891), Hospital for Crippled Children, Newark (1897), Mountainside, Montclair (1898), N. Y. State Orthopedic, West Haverstraw (1900), Englewood (1901), Hospital for Deformities (1908) and Flushing (1914). In 1917, he served as Division Surgeon, with the rank of lieutenant colonel, and during World War I, was in charge of orthopedic instruction to medical officers at the New York University.

Sayre died suddenly from myocardial degeneration. He was survived by a sister, Mary Jane. His two older brothers died in 1880 and 1890.

== Memberships and recognition ==
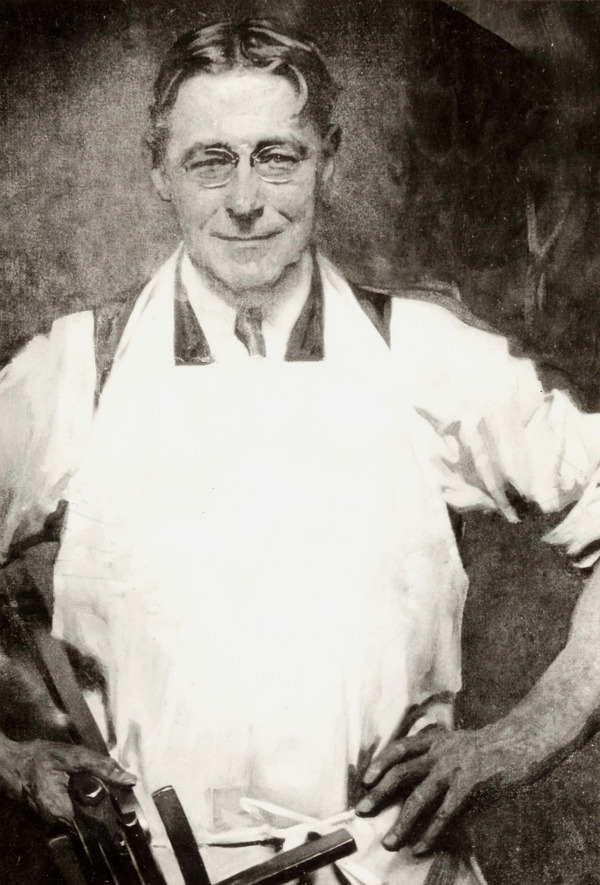
Sayre in medical outfit with a shooting rifle, c. 1900

Sayre was a member of the New York Academy of Medicine for 42 years and held various administrative posts there:

- Assistant secretary (1892–1894)
- Recording secretary (1895–1897)
- Chairman (1899)
- Treasurer (1900–1917)
- Vice-president (1919–?)

He was also vice-president of the American Orthopedic Association (1891–1892), an honorary vice-president of the orthopedic section of the Pan-American Medical Congress (1893), vice-president of the New York Pathological Society and Emeritus Professor of the New York University (1928). Sayre co-founded The Society of Alumni of Bellevue Hospital and served as its president between 1902 and 1910. He was also a Fellow of the American College of Surgeons, the American Medical and the American Orthopedic Associations, becoming president in 1904.

== Sports ==
Sayre had a passion for sports and took part in athletics while studying at Columbia College. He was also a member of the Varsity track team and once won the intercollegiate mile walk. Later in his life, he enjoyed horse riding and owned several horses. He was also a life member of the New York Athletic Club. However, he was most skilled in pistol shooting, winning American championships and becoming the captain of the US Olympic Pistol Teams in 1908 and 1912 Summer Olympics.

In 1908, he finished 21st in the individual pistol competition. In 1912, he became fourth in the team 30 metre military pistol competition; 13th in the 50 metre pistol event and 19th in the 30 metre rapid fire pistol competition.
