= Charles de Jaubert =

French sport shooter

Personal information
- Full name: Charles Louis de Jaubert
- Born: 19 April 1864 Paris, Second French Empire
- Died: 13 June 1935 (aged 71)

Sport
- Sport: Sport shooting

Baron Charles Louis de Jaubert (19 April 1864 – 13 June 1935) was a French sport shooter who competed in the 1900 Summer Olympics and in the 1912 Summer Olympics.

He was born in Paris. In 1900 he finished seventh in the individual trap competition.

Twelve years later at the Stockholm Games he participated in the following events:

- team clay pigeons event – sixth place
- team 30 metre dueling pistol – sixth place
- 100 metre running deer, double shots – tenth place
- individual trap – 25th place
- 30 metre dueling pistol – 36th place
