= Hans Roedder =

American sport shooter

Personal information
- Born: March 12, 1879 Oberschefflenz, Germany
- Died: December 9, 1966 (aged 87) Berwyn, Pennsylvania, United States

Sport
- Sport: Sports shooting

Hans Roedder (March 12, 1879 – December 9, 1966) was an American sport shooter who competed in the 1912 Summer Olympics. In 1912 he finished tenth in the 30 metre rapid fire pistol competition and 22nd in the 50 metre pistol event.
