= Harry Edward Sears =

American Olympic sport shooter

Personal information
- Born: April 11, 1870 Boston, Massachusetts, United States
- Died: October 19, 1920 (aged 50) Beverly, Massachusetts, United States
- Occupations: Physician, military officer
- Children: 2

Sport
- Sport: Sport shooting
Medal record
Men's shooting
Representing the United States
Olympic Games
Gold medal – first place	1912 Stockholm	50 metre team military pistol

Lieutenant-Colonel Harry Edward Sears (April 11, 1870 – October 19, 1920) was an American sport shooter, physician, socialite, and military officer who competed in the 1912 Summer Olympics.

He was part of the 50 metre military pistol team, which won the gold medal. He also participated in the 30 m rapid fire pistol event and finished 7th, and in the 50 metre pistol event, he finished 16th.

== Early life ==
At Harvard, c. 1893

Harry Edward Sears was born to Boston Brahmin father Lieutenant Edward Shailer Sears in Boston, Massachusetts, on April 11, 1870.

He graduated from Harvard College in 1893, then earned an MD from Harvard Medical School in 1896.

== Military service ==
Coming from a Brahmin family, Sears was expected to complete public or military service. He served in two separate wars over the course of his military career, first fighting in the Spanish–American War, treating outbreaks of malaria, typhoid, and yellow fever in Puerto Rico from August 1898 to May 1899.

When the United States decided to enter World War I, Harry decided to join the army with a few other men from the Beverly medical community, where he would serve in the medical corps in the Advance Section Services and Supply with field unit 30, attached to the 5th sanitary division of the 5th Division "Red Devils". On October 7, 1918, he was reassigned to Evacuation Hospital No.1, and was again reassigned to Evacuation Hospital No. 37 in February 1919 before being discharged as a Lt. Col. in May of that year.

== Post-military ==
After his second stint in the military, Sears returned home complaining of stomach problems he had contracted in France. Early in 1920, Sears and his wife took a vacation to Bermuda, upon returning home and undergoing surgery he fell into a severe bout of depression, taking his life in his medical office in 1920.

He had two sons, Rear Admiral Norman W. Sears and Admiral Harry Edward Sears Jr., who also went on to serve prominently in the armed forces.
