= Gerhard Bock =

German sports shooter

Personal information
- Born: 6 March 1879 Hannover, German Empire
- Died: 6 May 1945 (aged 66) Berlin, Germany

Sport
- Sport: Sports shooting

Gerhard Bock (6 March 1879 – 6 May 1945) was a German sport shooter who competed in the 1912 Summer Olympics. In 1912 he was a member of the German team which finished seventh in the 30 metre team military pistol competition. In the 50 metre pistol event he finished 44th.

Bock was a noted writer on the subject of firearms and he consulted with various makers on the design of the 50 meter free pistol.
