= Konstantinos Skarlatos =

Greek Army officer

Lieutenant General Konstantinos Skarlatos
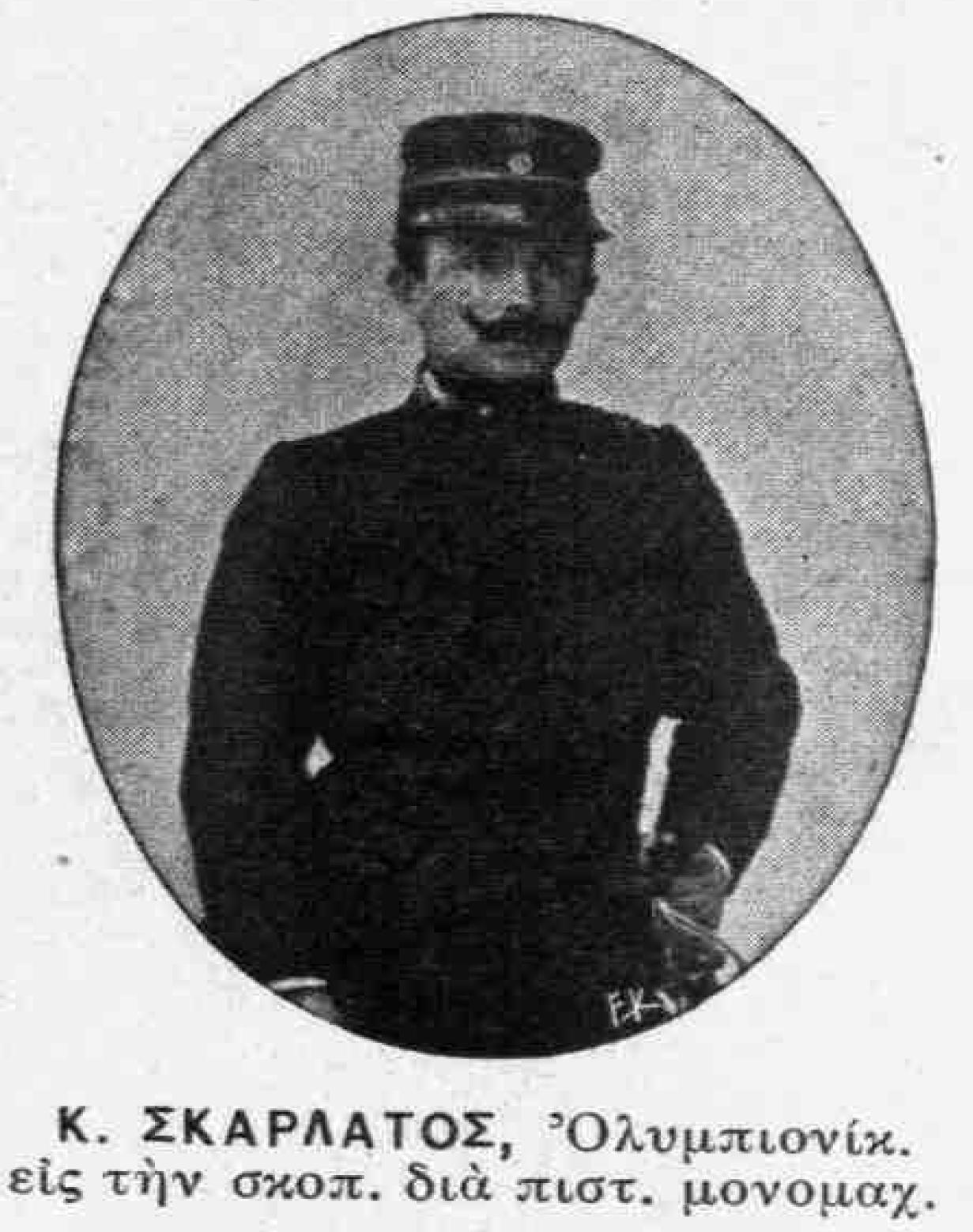
- Konstantinos Skarlatos c. 1908

Personal information
- Native name: Κωνσταντίνος Σκαρλάτος
- Nationality: Greek
- Born: 17 March 1872 Nafpaktos, Kingdom of Greece
- Died: 1969 (aged 96–97) Athens, Kingdom of Greece
- Education: Hellenic Army Academy
- Military career
- Allegiance: Kingdom of Greece
- Branch: Hellenic Army
- Rank: Lieutenant General
- Commands: Commander of Hellenic Military Academy
- Conflicts: Greco-Turkish War (1897); Balkan Wars; First Balkan War; Second Balkan War; Greco-Turkish War (1919–1922)

Sport
- Country: Greece
- Sport: Sports shooting
Medal record
Men's shooting
Representing Greece
Intercalated Games
Gold medal – first place	1906 Athens	30 m duelling pistol

Konstantinos Skarlatos (Greek: Κωνσταντίνος Σκαρλάτος, 17 March 1872 – 1969) was a Hellenic Army officer who reached the rank of Lieutenant General. He also competed in the 1906 Summer Olympics and in the 1912 Summer Olympics as a sport shooter.

== Military career ==
He was born in 1872 at Vitolitsa near Nafpaktos. He entered the Hellenic Military Academy and graduated in July 1892 as an artillery second lieutenant. He fought in the Greco-Turkish War of 1897, the Balkan Wars, and the Asia Minor Campaign. From 1921 to 1922, he served as Commander of the Military Academy and retired as lieutenant general.

== Olympic record ==
=== 1906 Athens ===
In the 1906 Summer Olympics, he participated in the following events:

- 30 m duelling pistol - first place
- 20 m duelling pistol - fourth place
- 50 m pistol - fourth place
- 25 m rapid fire pistol - 15th place
- 20 m army pistol (1873 model) - 17th place

=== 1912 Stockholm ===
Six years later at the 1912 Summer Olympics he participated in the following events:

- Team 50 metre military pistol - fifth place
- Team 30 metre military pistol - fifth place
- 30 metre rapid fire pistol - 27th place
- 50 metre pistol - 30th place
