= Edmond Sandoz =

French sports shooter

Personal information
- Born: 8 July 1872 Besançon, France
- Died: 20 April 1943 (aged 70)

Sport
- Sport: Sports shooting

Edmond Sandoz (8 July 1872 – 20 April 1943) was a French sports shooter. He competed in two events at the 1912 Summer Olympics.
