= John Dietz =

American sport shooter

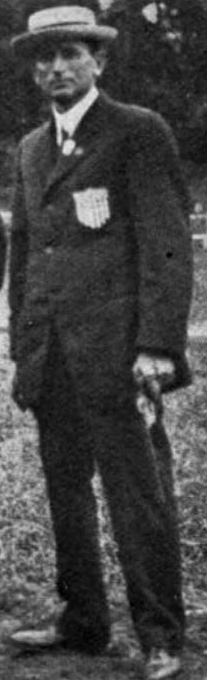
- At the 1912 Summer Olympics

Personal information
- Born: November 24, 1870 Germany
- Died: October 11, 1939 (aged 68) New York, New York, United States

Sport
- Sport: Sport shooting
Medal record
Men's shooting
Representing United States
Olympic Games
| Gold medal – first place | 1908 London | Team pistol |
| Gold medal – first place | 1912 Stockholm | 50m team pistol |

John A. Dietz (November 24, 1870 – October 11, 1939) was an American sport shooter who competed at the 1908 Summer Olympics and the 1912 Summer Olympics. He won two gold medals as part of the American pistol team.

In 1908, he also competed in the individual pistol event and finished ninth. In 1912 he finished fourth in the 30 metre military pistol team event. He also competed in the 30 metre rapid fire pistol event finishing fourth and in the 50 metre pistol finishing again ninth.
