= Peter Dolfen =

American sport shooter (1880–1947)

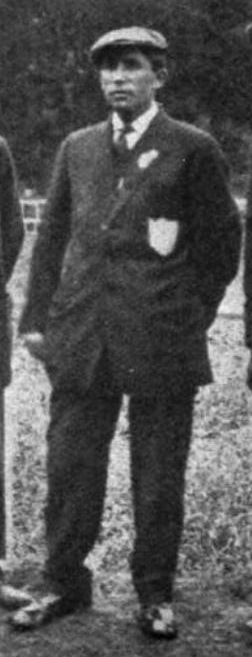
- At the 1912 Summer Olympics

Personal information
- Born: May 21, 1880 Hartford, Connecticut, United States
- Died: May 31, 1947 (aged 67) East Longmeadow, Massachusetts, United States

Sport
- Sport: Sport shooting
Medal record
Men's shooting
Representing United States
Olympic Games
Gold medal – first place	1912 Stockholm	50 metre team military pistol
Silver medal – second place	1912 Stockholm	50 metre pistol

Peter James Dolfen (May 21, 1880 – May 31, 1947) was an American sport shooter who competed in the 1912 Summer Olympics. In addition to his two medals, he also competed in the 30 m rapid fire pistol event and finished 16th.

Dolfen was born in Hartford, Connecticut, and died in East Longmeadow, Massachusetts.
