= Grigori Shesterikov =

Russian sport shooter

Personal information
- Born: 10 January 1877 Zhytomyr, Russian Empire

Sport
- Sport: Sports shooting

Grigori Shesterikov (Russian: Григорий Шестериков, born 10 January 1877 (unknown OS/NS), date of death unknown) was a Russian sport shooter who competed in the 1912 Summer Olympics.

In the 1912 Summer Olympics he participated in the following events:

- Team 50 metre military pistol – fourth place
- 50 metre pistol – 31st place
- 30 metre rapid fire pistol – 32nd place
