= Amos Kash =

Russian sport shooter (1868–1948)

Personal information
- Born: 15 June 1868
- Died: 4 December 1948 (aged 80)

Sport
- Sport: Sport shooting
Medal record
Men's shooting
Representing Russia
Olympic Games
Silver medal – second place	1912 Stockholm	Team 30 metre military pistol

Amos Kash (Russian: Амос Каш; 15 June [O.S. 3 June] 1868 – 4 December 1948) was a Russian sport shooter who competed in the 1912 Summer Olympics. He was part of the Russian 30 metre military pistol team that won the silver medal. He also competed in the 30 metre rapid fire pistol event, finishing 28th and in the 50 metre pistol finishing 46th.
