= Albert Kempster =

British sport shooter (1874–1952)

Personal information
- Born: 23 August 1874 Leighton Buzzard, England
- Died: 2 January 1952 (aged 77) Saint Martin, Jersey, England
- Spouse: Eleanor née Grosvalet (1898-)

Sport
- Sport: Sports shooting
Medal record
Men's shooting
Representing Great Britain
Olympic Games
Bronze medal – third place	1912 Stockholm	Team 30 m pistol
Bronze medal – third place	1912 Stockholm	Team 50 m pistol

Albert Joseph Kempster (23 August 1874 – 2 January 1952) was a British sport shooter who competed at the 1908 Summer Olympics and the 1912 Summer Olympics.

In 1908, he finished fifth in the running deer single shots competition as well as in the running deer double shots event. Four years later, he won the bronze medal as a member of the British team in the team 30 metre military pistol event as well as in the team 50 metre military pistol competition. In the individual 50 metre pistol event he finished 24th. RSM Royal Jersey Militia.

== Personal life ==
Albert Joseph Kempster came to Jersey Channel Islands in the early 1890s. He was attached to the Northampton Regiment at the time. He married a Breton, Eleanor Grosvalet, in 1898, not long before being sent to South Africa, where war had broken out and from where he was later invalided home with enteric fever. In 1900, he was appointed to the permanent staff of the Royal Jersey Militia.

They had twelve children: John, Cecil, Jim, Arthur, Robert, Phyllis, Doris, Charlotte, Louis, George, Joan, and Yvonne.

He possessed a good voice singing opera and operetta. He was an amateur boxer, gymnast, and swordsman who boxed for the British army in front of the Prince of Wales and the German Kaiser. He was awarded for bravery with the Albert Medal when, at great risk to himself, he stopped a runaway horse and carriage.
