= Grigori Panteleimonov =

Russian sport shooter

Personal information
- Born: 30 December 1885 Balta, Russian Empire
- Died: 31 October 1934 (aged 48) Belgrade, Kingdom of Yugoslavia

Sport
- Sport: Sports shooting
Medal record
Men's shooting
Representing Russia
Olympic Games
Silver medal – second place	1912 Stockholm	Team 30 metre military pistol

Grigori Panteleimonov (Russian: Григорий Пантелеймонов, 17 December 1885 – 31 October 1934) was a Russian sport shooter who competed in the 1912 Summer Olympics. He was born in Balta, now in Ukraine. He was part of the Russian 30 metre military pistol team, which won the silver medal. He also competed in the 30 metre rapid fire pistol event finishing 14th and in the 50 metre pistol finishing 17th.
