= Paul Palén =

Swedish sport shooter

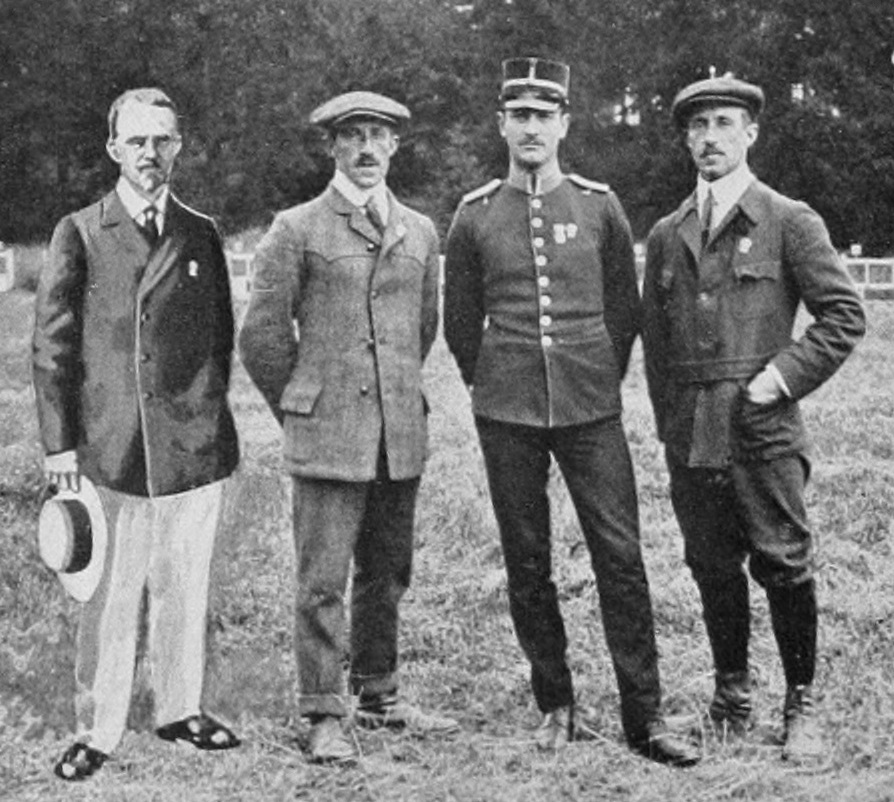
- Paul Palén (left) at the 1912 Olympics

Personal information
- Nationality: Swedish
- Born: 4 April 1881 Garpenberg, Sweden
- Died: 12 October 1944 (aged 63) Stockholm, Sweden

Sport
- Country: Sweden
- Sport: Shooting
- Club: Västerviks SG
Medal record
Representing Sweden
Olympic Games
| Gold medal – first place | 1912 Stockholm | Team 30 m military pistol |
| Silver medal – second place | 1912 Stockholm | Rapid fire pistol |

A. G. Paul Palén (4 April 1881 – 12 October 1944) was a Swedish sport shooter who competed in the 1912 Summer Olympics. He won the gold medal as member of the Swedish team in the 30 m military pistol event and a silver medal in the rapid fire pistol competition. He also participated in the 50 metre pistol event and finished 36th.
