= Hugh Durant =

British sports shooter and athlete

Personal information
- Born: 23 February 1877 Brixton, London, England
- Died: 20 January 1916 (aged 38) Vermelles, France

Sport
- Sport: Shooting, modern pentathlon
Medal record
Men's Shooting
Representing United Kingdom
Olympic Games
Bronze medal – third place	1912 Stockholm	Team 30 m pistol
Bronze medal – third place	1912 Stockholm	Team 50 m pistol

Hugh Durant (23 February 1877 – 20 January 1916) was a British sport shooter and modern pentathlete who competed in the 1912 Summer Olympics.

In 1912, he won the bronze medal as a member of the British team in the team 30 metre military pistol event and in the team 50 metre military pistol competition. In the individual 50 metre pistol event he finished 20th. He also participated in the first contested modern pentathlon event and finished 18th.

He was killed in action during World War I.

== See also ==
- List of Olympians killed in World War I
