= Erik Boström =

Swedish sport shooter (1869–1932)

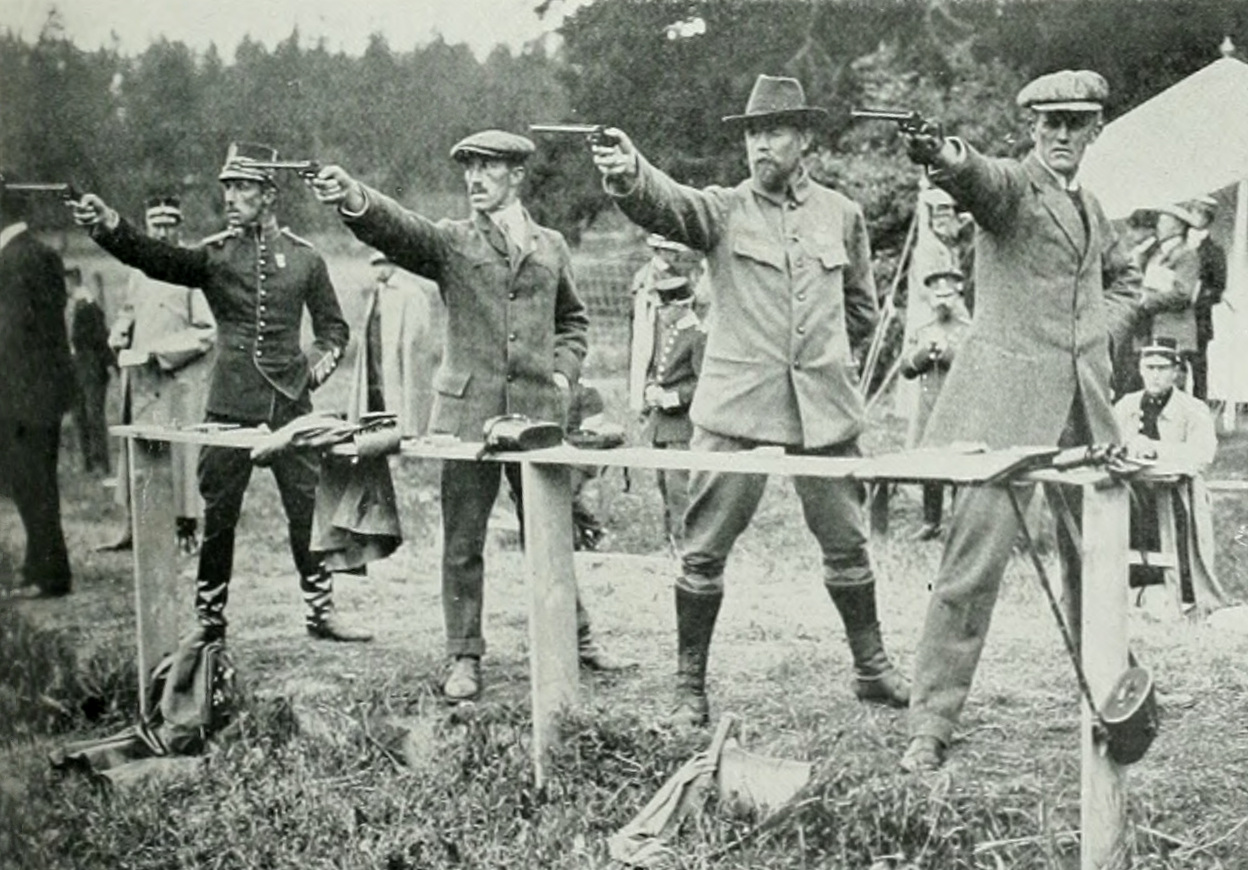
- Erik Boström (2nd from right) at the 1912 Olympics

Personal information
- Born: 23 August 1869 Stockholm, Sweden
- Died: 13 June 1932 (aged 62) Lissma, Stockholm, Sweden

Sport
- Sport: Shooting
- Events: Pistol, rifle
- Club: Stockholms PK
Medal record
Representing Sweden
Olympic Games
Silver medal – second place	1912 Stockholm	Team 50 m military

Erik Boström (23 August 1869 – 13 June 1932) was a Swedish sport shooter who competed in the 1912 Summer Olympics. He won the silver medal in the 50 metre military pistol team event and finished fifth in the 50 m pistol, eighth in the 50 m rifle, prone, and 17th in the 30 m rapid fire pistol.
