= Horatio Poulter =

British sport shooter (1877–1963)

Personal information
- Born: 29 October 1877 Frimley, Surrey, England
- Died: 30 August 1963 (aged 85) Guildford, Surrey, England

Sport
- Sport: Sports shooting
Medal record
Men's shooting
Representing United Kingdom
Olympic Games
Bronze medal – third place	1912 Stockholm	Team 30 m pistol
Bronze medal – third place	1912 Stockholm	Team 50 m pistol

Horatio Orlando Poulter (29 October 1877 – 30 August 1963) was a British sport shooter who competed in the 1912 Summer Olympics.

In 1912, he won the bronze medal as a member of the British team in the team 30 metre military pistol event as well as in the team 50 metre military pistol competition. He finished sixth in the individual 50 metre pistol event.
