= Johan Hübner von Holst =

Swedish sport shooter (1881–1945)

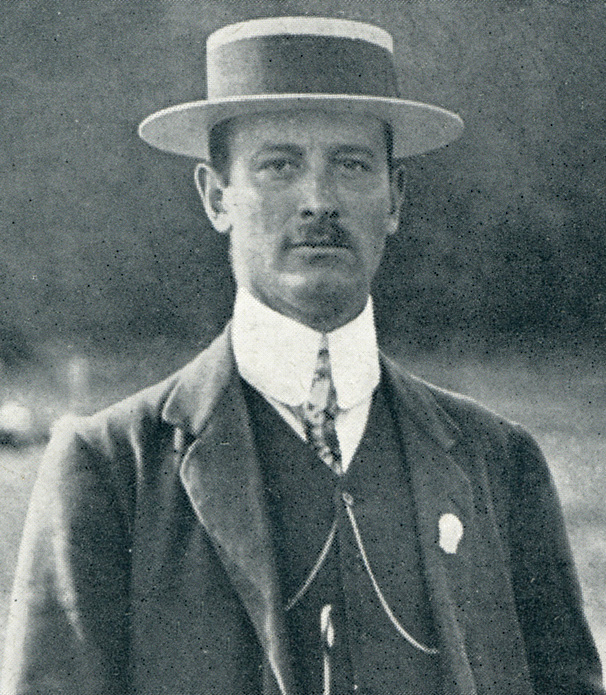

Personal information
- Nationality: Swedish
- Born: 22 August 1881 Stockholm, Sweden
- Died: 13 June 1945 (aged 63) Stockholm, Sweden

Sport
- Country: Sweden
- Sport: Sports shooting
- Club: Stockholms AF; Stockholms PK
Medal record
Representing Sweden
Intercalated Games
Silver medal – second place	1906 Athens	30 m duelling pistol
Olympic Games
Gold medal – first place	1912 Stockholm	Team 25 m small-bore rifle
Gold medal – first place	1912 Stockholm	Team 30 m military pistol
Silver medal – second place	1908 London	Team small-bore rifle
Silver medal – second place	1912 Stockholm	Small-bore rifle
Bronze medal – third place	1912 Stockholm	Rapid fire pistol

Johan Hübner von Holst (22 August 1881 – 13 June 1945) was a Swedish sport shooter who competed at the 1906, 1908 and 1912 Summer Olympics.

In 1906, he won the silver medal in the 30 metre duelling pistol event. He also participated in the following events:

- 25 m rapid fire pistol – fifth place
- 50 m pistol – tenth place
- 20 m duelling pistol – 19th place
- 25 m army pistol (standard model) – 21st place
- Free rifle, free position – 25th place
- 300 m army rifle – 26th place

Two years later, he was a member of the Swedish team, which won the silver medal in the team small-bore rifle competition. He also participated in the following events:

- Team pistol – fifth place
- disappearing target small-bore rifle – 15th place
- moving target small-bore rifle – 15th place
- stationary target small-bore rifle – 18th place
- individual pistol – 27th place

At the 1912 Summer Olympics, he won two gold, one silver, and one bronze medal. He also finished ninth in the 50 m rifle, prone event.

In 1914 Hübner von Holst competed in the Baltic Games in Malmö and won five gold and one bronze medal. He was a son of Lord Chamberlain Johan Gustaf von Holst and a captain in the Swedish army.
