= Pavel Voyloshnikov =

Russian sport shooter

Personal information
- Born: 10 January 1879 Tsagan-Oluy, Russian Empire
- Died: 19 November 1938 (aged 59) Transbaikal Oblast, Russian SFSR, Soviet Union

Sport
- Sport: Sports shooting
Medal record
Men's shooting
Representing Russia
Olympic Games
Silver medal – second place	1912 Stockholm	Team 30 metre military pistol

Pavel Voyloshnikov (Russian: Павел Войлошников, born 28 December 1878 (Julian calendar)/10 January 1879 (Gregorian calendar), Transbaikal Oblast – 19 November 1938) was a Russian sport shooter who competed in the 1912 Summer Olympics.

He was part of the Russian 30 metre military pistol team, which won the silver medal. As part of the 50 metre military pistol team, he finished fourth. He also competed in the 30 metre rapid fire pistol event, finishing 24th and in the 50 metre pistol finishing 34th.
