= Nikolai Melnitsky =

Russian sport shooter

Personal information
- Born: 9 May 1887 Kyiv, Russian Empire
- Died: 7 November 1965 (aged 78) Paris, France

Sport
- Sport: Sports shooting
Medal record
Men's shooting
Representing Russia
Olympic Games
| Silver medal – second place | 1912 Stockholm | Team 30 metre military pistol |

Nikolai Melnitsky (Russian: Николай Мельницкий, 26 April 1887 (OS)/9 May 1887(NS), Kyiv, Russian Empire – 7 November 1965) was a sport shooter who competed for the Russian Empire in the 1912 Summer Olympics.

He was born in Kyiv on 9 May 1887. He was part of the Russian 30 metre military pistol team, which won the silver medal. He finished fourth as part of the 50 metre military pistol team. He also competed in the 30 metre rapid fire pistol event, finishing 22nd and in the 50 metre pistol finishing 33rd.
