= Alfred Lane =

American sport shooter

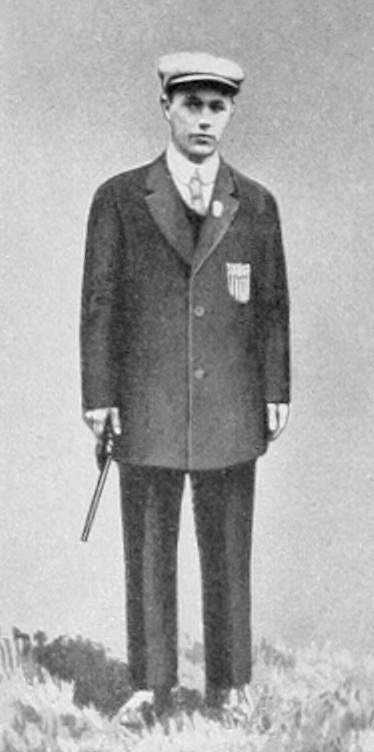
- Lane in 1912

Personal information
- Born: September 26, 1891 New York, United States
- Died: October 2, 1965 (aged 74) New York, United States

Sport
- Sport: Shooting
- Club: US Army
Medal record
Representing the United States
Olympic Games
Gold medal – first place	1912 Stockholm	30 m rapid fire pistol
Gold medal – first place	1912 Stockholm	50 m pistol
Gold medal – first place	1912 Stockholm	Team 50 m military pistol
Gold medal – first place	1920 Antwerp	Team 30 m army pistol
Gold medal – first place	1920 Antwerp	Team 50 m army pistol
Bronze medal – third place	1920 Antwerp	50 m pistol

Alfred Page Lane (September 26, 1891 – October 2, 1965) was an American sport shooter who competed at the 1912 and 1920 Summer Olympics. He is a five-time Olympic champion and is the first of five shooters to have won two Olympic individual gold medals.

== Biography ==
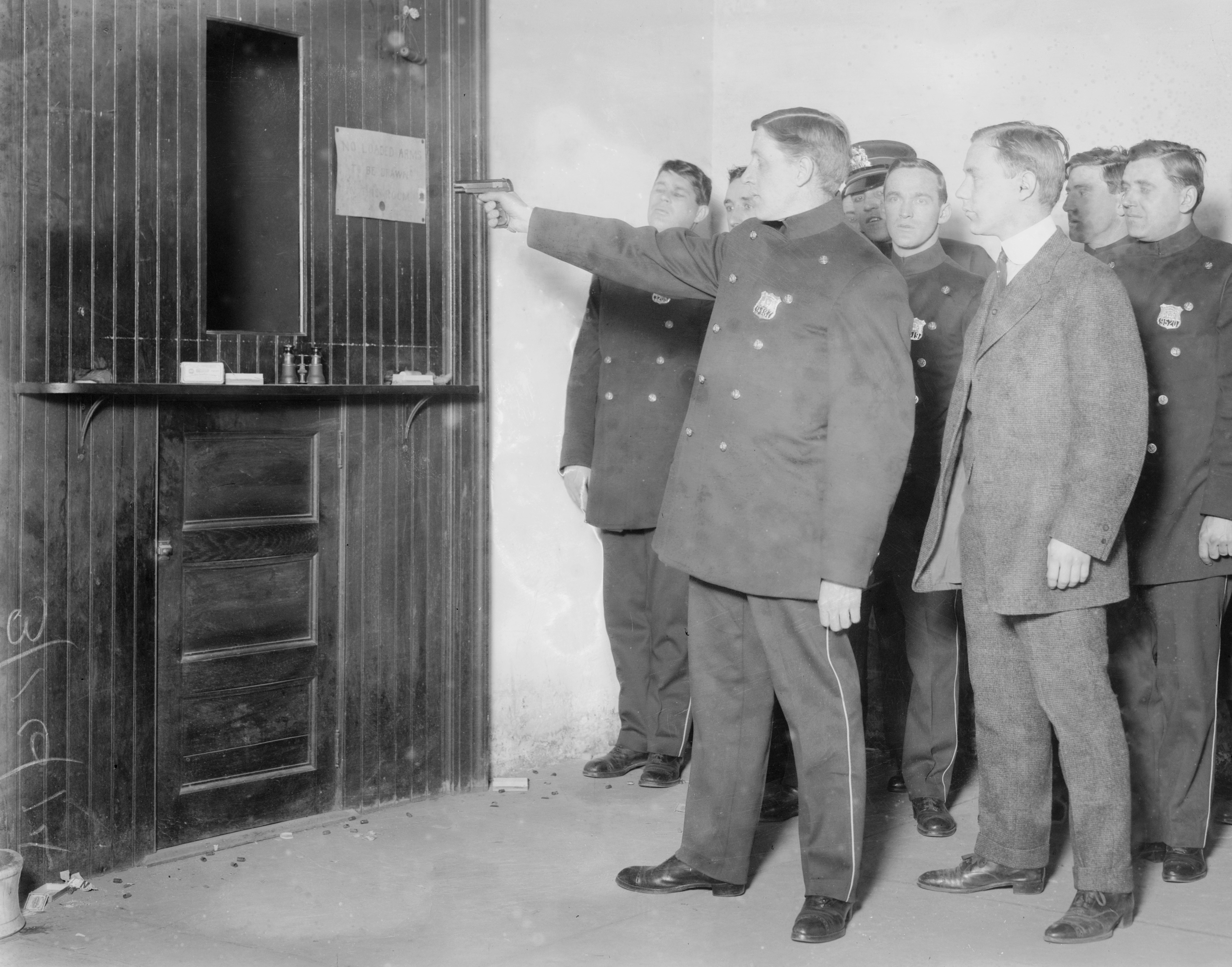
Lane giving shooting lesson to New York City police, 1914

Lane was born to Frederic Henry Lane and Louise Abbott Mosely. He started training in shooting at the Manhattan Rifle and Revolver Association in New York and, by the age of 19, won several U.S. Revolver Association (USRA) championships. After the 1912 Olympics, he held USRA Champion titles for three consecutive years. He was later employed by Remington Arms for their advertising campaigns and then became head of the photographic department for a magazine publisher.

His five gold medals and one bronze medal were on loan from his family and on display at the National Firearms Museum in Fairfax, Virginia. He was inducted into the United States International Shooters Hall of Fame in 1991.

== See also ==
- List of multiple Olympic gold medalists
