= Kaknäs =

Coordinates: 59.33588°N 18.14273°E

Kaknäs Gravfält
- former Village
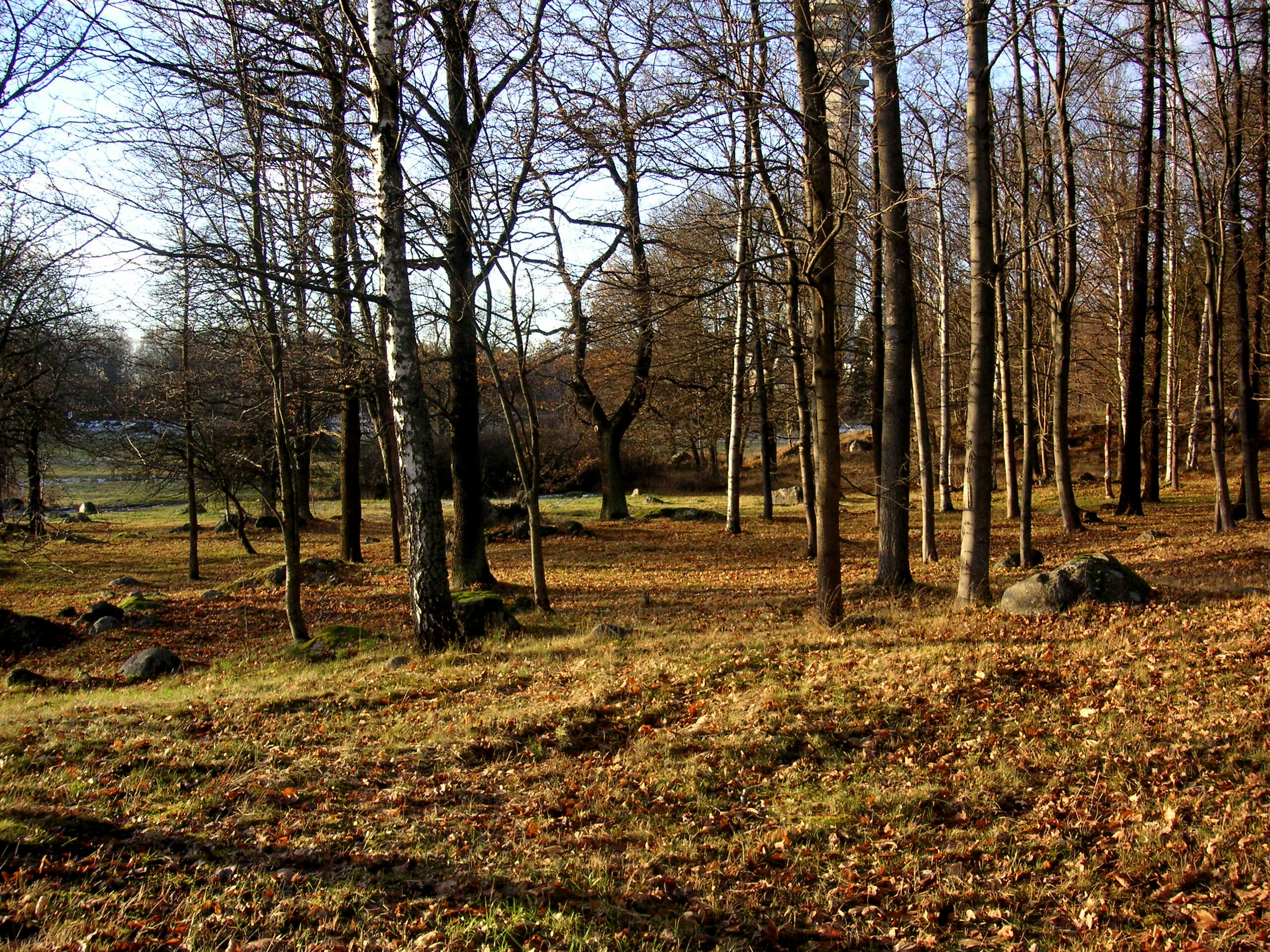
- Kaknäs Iron Age burial ground
- Interactive map of Kaknäs
- Country: Sweden
- Historical region: Uppland
- County: Stockholm
- Municipality: Stockholm Municipality

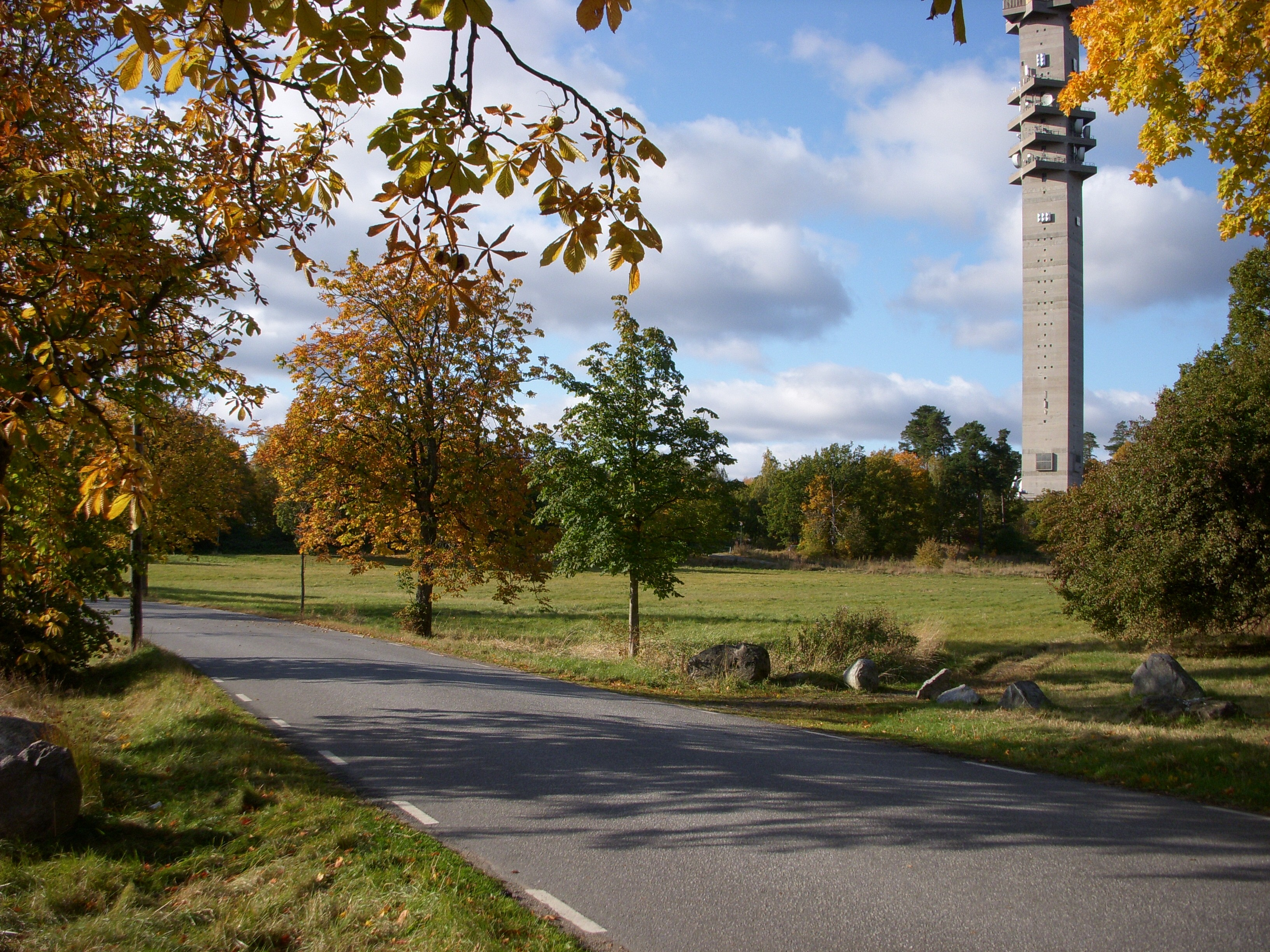
The Kaknäs area at Kaknäsvägen road, with Kaknästornet in the background.

Kaknäs is a former village in medieval times located in Stockholm, Sweden, as part of the Ladugårdsgärdet area. It is the site of several archeological finds and has given its name to Kaknästornet.

During the 1912 Summer Olympics, it hosted several shooting events. The shooting part of the modern pentathlon competition also took place here.

== See also ==
- Kaknästornet
