= Charles Stewart (sport shooter) =

British sport shooter (1881–1965)

Personal information
- Born: 6 September 1881 Lacock, Wiltshire, England
- Died: 1965 (aged 83–84) Weymouth, Dorset, England

Sport
- Sport: Sports shooting
Medal record
Men's shooting
Representing United Kingdom
Olympic Games
Bronze medal – third place	1912 Stockholm	50 metre pistol
Bronze medal – third place	1912 Stockholm	Team 30 m pistol
Bronze medal – third place	1912 Stockholm	Team 50 m pistol

Charles Edward Stewart (6 September 1881 – 1965) was a British sport shooter who competed in the 1912 Summer Olympics.

In 1912, he won the bronze medal in the individual 50 metre pistol event. He also won two bronze medals as a member of the British team in the team 30 metre military pistol event and in the team 50 metre military pistol competition.
