= Vilhelm Carlberg =

Swedish sport shooter (1880–1970)

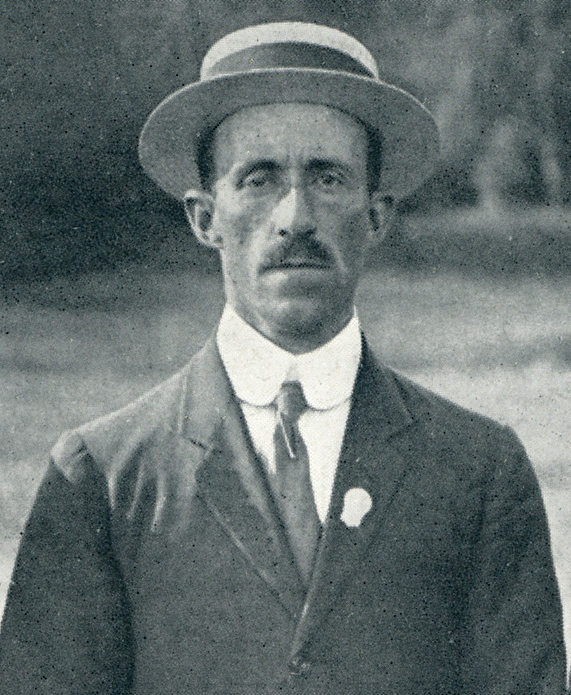

Personal information
- Nationality: Swedish
- Born: 5 April 1880 Karlskrona, Sweden
- Died: 1 October 1970 (aged 90) Stockholm, Sweden

Sport
- Country: Sweden
- Sport: Sports shooting
- Club: Stockholms AF; Stockholms PK; FOK, Stockholm
Medal record
Representing Sweden
Intercalated Games
Bronze medal – third place	1906 Athens	Duelling pistol 25m
Olympic Games
Gold medal – first place	1912 Stockholm	Team 30 m military pistol
Gold medal – first place	1912 Stockholm	25 m small-bore rifle
Gold medal – first place	1912 Stockholm	Team 25 m small-bore rifle
Silver medal – second place	1908 London	Team small-bore rifle
Silver medal – second place	1912 Stockholm	Team 50 m military pistol
Silver medal – second place	1912 Stockholm	Team 50 m small-bore rifle
Silver medal – second place	1924 Paris	25 m rapid fire pistol
ISSF World Shooting Championships
Gold medal – first place	1913 Ohio	Free pistol, individual
Bronze medal – third place	1913 Ohio	Free pistol, team

Gustaf Vilhelm Carlberg (5 April 1880 – 1 October 1970) was a Swedish Army officer and sports shooter. He competed at the 1908, 1912, and 1924 Olympics and won three gold and four silver. With three gold and two silver medals he was the most successful athlete at the 1912 Olympics. In 1913, he won two medals at the ISSF World Shooting Championships. His twin brother Eric competed alongside Gustaf at all those four Olympics.

Vilhelm and Eric were the youngest of four children of a veterinarian, who died when they were 12 years old. The twins became military officers in 1901 and retired with the rank of major. In 1911, they became physical education instructors. Besides shooting, Vilhelm was a keen gymnast who participated in the exhibition at the 1906 Olympics and helped organize gymnastics events at the 1912 Games. In 1921 Vilhelm married the singer Elsa Reuter.
