= Free rifle at the Olympics =

Free rifle at the Olympic Games
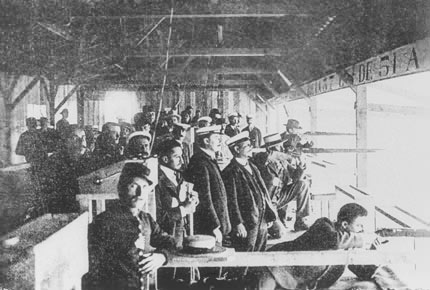
- Rifle shooting at the 1900 Summer Olympics

Overview
- Sport: Shooting
- Gender: Men and women
- Years held: Men: At least one event every year shooting has been held (i.e., excl. 1904 and 1928); Women: 1984–2020

Reigning champion
- Men: Zhang Changhong (CHN)
- Women: Nina Christen (SUI)

The free rifle is a group of events held at the Olympics, beginning in 1896 and continuing to the current programme. Current nomenclature drops the "free" and refers to the event type as the "rifle." The women's 50-metre version has also been called the "standard" and "sport" rifle. The "free" rifle is distinct from the military, air, and small-bore rifle events.

The current Olympic program includes two free rifle events: the ISSF 50 meter rifle three positions for both men (since 1952) and women (since 1984; women were nominally allowed to compete with the men from 1968 to 1980, although very few women participated these years). Two other events were held for numerous Games: the 300 m rifle three positions for men from 1900 to 1920 and from 1948 to 1972 and the ISSF 50 meter rifle prone for men from 1912 to 2016 (excluding 1920 and 1924). The 300 m rifle prone is a shooting discipline held at the world championships but never consistently at the Olympics.

In 1896, a 300-meter free rifle event was held without position requirements. In 1900, medals were awarded for each of the three positions in the 300-metre free rifle competition, using the scores from the full individual event. Four team events were held, with individual scores summed to give a team result in 1900 and 1920 and separate team shooting in 1908 and 1912. A 600-meter event for men was held in 1912, a 600-meter prone event for men in 1924, and a 1000-yard event for men in 1908.

== 50 m rifle three positions ==
=== Men ===
Games	Gold	Silver	Bronze
1952 Helsinki	Erling Kongshaug; Norway	Vilho Ylönen; Finland	Boris Andreyev; Soviet Union
1956 Melbourne	Anatoli Bogdanov; Soviet Union	Otakar Hořínek; Czechoslovakia	John Sundberg; Sweden
1960 Rome	Viktor Shamburkin; Soviet Union	Marat Nyýazow; Soviet Union	Klaus Zähringer; United Team of Germany
1964 Tokyo	Lones Wigger; United States	Velichko Velichkov; Bulgaria	László Hammerl; Hungary
1968 Mexico City (mixed)	Bernd Klingner; West Germany	John Writer; United States	Vitaly Parkhimovich; Soviet Union
1972 Munich (mixed)	John Writer; United States	Lanny Bassham; United States	Werner Lippoldt; East Germany
1976 Montreal (mixed)	Lanny Bassham; United States	Margaret Murdock; United States	Werner Seibold; West Germany
1980 Moscow (mixed)	Viktor Vlasov; Soviet Union	Bernd Hartstein; East Germany	Sven Johansson; Sweden
1984 Los Angeles	Malcolm Cooper; Great Britain	Daniel Nipkow; Switzerland	Alister Allan; Great Britain
1988 Seoul	Malcolm Cooper; Great Britain	Alister Allan; Great Britain	Kirill Ivanov; Soviet Union
1992 Barcelona	Hrachya Petikyan; Unified Team	Robert Foth; United States	Ryohei Koba; Japan
1996 Atlanta	Jean-Pierre Amat; France	Sergey Belyayev; Kazakhstan	Wolfram Waibel; Austria
2000 Sydney	Rajmond Debevec; Slovenia	Juha Hirvi; Finland	Harald Stenvaag; Norway
2004 Athens	Jia Zhanbo; China	Michael Anti; United States	Christian Planer; Austria
2008 Beijing	Qiu Jian; China	Jury Sukhorukov; Ukraine	Rajmond Debevec; Slovenia
2012 London	Niccolò Campriani; Italy	Kim Jong-Hyun; South Korea	Matthew Emmons; United States
2016 Rio de Janeiro	Niccolò Campriani; Italy	Sergey Kamenskiy; Russia	Alexis Raynaud; France
2020 Tokyo	Zhang Changhong; China	Sergey Kamenskiy; ROC	Milenko Sebić; Serbia
2024 Paris	Liu Yukun; China	Serhiy Kulish; Ukraine	Swapnil Kusale; India

==== Multiple medalists ====
Rank	Athlete	Nation	Olympics	Gold	Silver	Bronze	Total
1	Malcolm Cooper	Great Britain	1984–1988	2	0	0	2
1	Niccolò Campriani	Italy	2012–2016	2	0	0	2
3	John Writer	United States	1968–1972	1	1	0	2
3	Lanny Bassham	United States	1972–1976	1	1	0	2
5	Rajmond Debevec	Slovenia	2000, 2008	1	0	1	2
6	Alister Allan	Great Britain	1984–1988	0	1	1	2

==== Medalists by nation ====
Rank	Nation	Gold	Silver	Bronze	Total
1	United States	3	5	1	9
2	Soviet Union	3	1	3	8
3	China	3	0	0	3
4	Great Britain	2	1	1	4
5	Italy	2	0	0	2
6	France	1	0	1	2
6	West Germany	1	0	1	2
6	Norway	1	0	1	2
6	Slovenia	1	0	1	2
10	Unified Team	1	0	0	1
11	Finland	0	2	0	2
12	East Germany	0	1	1	2
13	Bulgaria	0	1	0	1
13	Czechoslovakia	0	1	0	1
13	Kazakhstan	0	1	0	1
13	Russia	0	1	0	1
13	South Korea	0	1	0	1
13	Switzerland	0	1	0	1
13	Ukraine	0	1	0	1
20	Austria	0	0	2	2
20	Sweden	0	0	2	2
22	United Team of Germany	0	0	1	1
22	Hungary	0	0	1	1
22	Japan	0	0	1	1

=== Women ===
Games	Gold	Silver	Bronze
1984 Los Angeles	Wu Xiaoxuan; China	Ulrike Holmer; West Germany	Wanda Jewell; United States
1988 Seoul	Silvia Sperber; West Germany	Vesela Letcheva; Bulgaria	Valentina Cherkasova; Soviet Union
1992 Barcelona	Launi Meili; United States	Nonka Matova; Bulgaria	Małgorzata Książkiewicz; Poland
1996 Atlanta	Aleksandra Ivošev; FR Yugoslavia	Irina Gerasimenok; Russia	Renata Mauer; Poland
2000 Sydney	Renata Mauer; Poland	Tatiana Goldobina; Russia	Maria Feklistova; Russia
2004 Athens	Lioubov Galkina; Russia	Valentina Turisini; Italy	Wang Chengyi; China
2008 Beijing	Du Li; China	Kateřina Emmons; Czech Republic	Eglis Yaima Cruz; Cuba
2012 London	Jamie Lynn Gray; United States	Ivana Maksimović; Serbia	Adéla Sýkorová; Czech Republic
2016 Rio de Janeiro	Barbara Engleder; Germany	Zhang Binbin; China	Du Li; China
2020 Tokyo	Nina Christen; Switzerland	Yulia Zykova; ROC	Yulia Karimova; ROC
2024 Paris	Chiara Leone; Switzerland	Sagen Maddalena; United States	Zhang Qiongyue; China

==== Multiple medalists ====
Rank	Athlete	Nation	Olympics	Gold	Silver	Bronze	Total
1	Renata Mauer	Poland	1996–2000	1	0	1	2
1	Du Li	China	2008, 2016	1	0	1	2

==== Medalists by nation ====
Rank	Nation	Gold	Silver	Bronze	Total
1	China	2	1	2	5
2	United States	2	0	1	3
3	Russia	1	2	1	4
4	West Germany	1	1	0	2
5	Poland	1	0	2	3
6	Germany	1	0	0	1
6	Yugoslavia	1	0	0	1
8	Bulgaria	0	2	0	2
9	Czech Republic	0	1	1	2
10	Italy	0	1	0	1
10	Serbia	0	1	0	1
12	Cuba	0	0	1	1
12	Soviet Union	0	0	1	1

== 50 m rifle prone ==
=== Men ===
Games	Gold	Silver	Bronze
1908 London	Arthur Carnell; Great Britain	Harold Humby; Great Britain	George Barnes; Great Britain
1912 Stockholm	Frederick Hird; United States	William Milne; Great Britain	Henry Burt; Great Britain
1920 Antwerp	Not held		
1924 Paris	Not held		
1928 Amsterdam	Not held		
1932 Los Angeles	Bertil Rönnmark; Sweden	Gustavo Huet; Mexico	Zoltán Soós-Ruszka Hradetzky; Hungary
1936 Berlin	Willy Røgeberg; Norway	Ralph Berzsenyi; Hungary	Władysław Karaś; Poland
1948 London	Arthur Cook; United States	Walter Tomsen; United States	Jonas Jonsson; Sweden
1952 Helsinki	Iosif Sîrbu; Romania	Boris Andreyev; Soviet Union	Arthur Jackson; United States
1956 Melbourne	Gerald Ouellette; Canada	Vasily Borisov; Soviet Union	Gil Boa; Canada
1960 Rome	Peter Kohnke; United Team of Germany	James Enoch Hill; United States	Enrico Forcella; Venezuela
1964 Tokyo	László Hammerl; Hungary	Lones Wigger; United States	Tommy Pool; United States
1968 Mexico City (mixed)	Jan Kůrka; Czechoslovakia	László Hammerl; Hungary	Ian Ballinger; New Zealand
1972 Munich (mixed)	Ri Ho-jun; North Korea	Victor Auer; United States	Nicolae Rotaru; Romania
1976 Montreal (mixed)	Karlheinz Smieszek; West Germany	Ulrich Lind; West Germany	Gennadi Lushchikov; Soviet Union
1980 Moscow (mixed)	Károly Varga; Hungary	Hellfried Heilfort; East Germany	Petar Zapryanov; Bulgaria
1984 Los Angeles	Edward Etzel; United States	Michel Bury; France	Michael Sullivan; Great Britain
1988 Seoul	Miroslav Varga; Czechoslovakia	Cha Young-chul; South Korea	Attila Záhonyi; Hungary
1992 Barcelona	Lee Eun-chul; South Korea	Harald Stenvaag; Norway	Stevan Pletikosić; Independent Olympic Participants
1996 Atlanta	Christian Klees; Germany	Sergey Belyayev; Kazakhstan	Jozef Gönci; Slovakia
2000 Sydney	Jonas Edman; Sweden	Torben Grimmel; Denmark	Sergei Martynov; Belarus
2004 Athens	Matthew Emmons; United States	Christian Lusch; Germany	Sergei Martynov; Belarus
2008 Beijing	Artur Ayvazyan; Ukraine	Matthew Emmons; United States	Warren Potent; Australia
2012 London	Sergei Martynov; Belarus	Lionel Cox; Belgium	Rajmond Debevec; Slovenia
2016 Rio de Janeiro	Henri Junghänel; Germany	Kim Jong-hyun; South Korea	Kirill Grigoryan; Russia

==== Multiple medalists ====
Rank	Athlete	Nation	Olympics	Gold	Silver	Bronze	Total
1	László Hammerl	Hungary	1964–1968	1	1	0	2
1	Matthew Emmons	United States	2004–2008	1	1	0	2
3	Sergei Martynov	Belarus	2000–2004, 2012	1	0	2	3

==== Medalists by nation ====
Rank	Nation	Gold	Silver	Bronze	Total
1	United States	4	5	2	11
2	Hungary	2	2	2	6
3	Germany	2	1	0	3
4	Sweden	2	0	1	3
5	Czechoslovakia	2	0	0	2
6	Great Britain	1	2	3	6
7	South Korea	1	2	0	3
8	West Germany	1	1	0	2
8	Norway	1	1	0	2
10	Belarus	1	0	2	3
11	Canada	1	0	1	2
11	Romania	1	0	1	2
13	United Team of Germany	1	0	0	1
13	North Korea	1	0	0	1
13	Ukraine	1	0	0	1
16	Soviet Union	0	2	1	3
17	Belgium	0	1	0	1
17	Denmark	0	1	0	1
17	France	0	1	0	1
17	East Germany	0	1	0	1
17	Kazakhstan	0	1	0	1
17	Mexico	0	1	0	1
23	Australia	0	0	1	1
23	Bulgaria	0	0	1	1
23	Independent Olympic Participants	0	0	1	1
23	New Zealand	0	0	1	1
23	Poland	0	0	1	1
23	Russia	0	0	1	1
23	Slovakia	0	0	1	1
23	Slovenia	0	0	1	1
23	Venezuela	0	0	1	1

== 300 m rifle three positions ==
=== Men ===
Games	Gold	Silver	Bronze
1900 Paris	Emil Kellenberger; Switzerland	Anders Peter Nielsen; Denmark	Paul Van Asbroeck; Belgium Ole Østmo; Norway
1904 St. Louis	Not held		
1908 London	Albert Helgerud; Norway	Harry Simon; United States	Ole Sæther; Norway
1912 Stockholm	Paul Colas; France	Lars Jørgen Madsen; Denmark	Niels Larsen; Denmark
1920 Antwerp	Morris Fisher; United States	Niels Larsen; Denmark	Østen Østensen; Norway
1924 Paris	Not held		
1928 Amsterdam	Not held		
1932 Los Angeles	Not held		
1936 Berlin	Not held		
1948 London	Emil Grünig; Switzerland	Pauli Janhonen; Finland	Willy Røgeberg; Norway
1952 Helsinki	Anatoli Bogdanov; Soviet Union	Robert Bürchler; Switzerland	Lev Vainshtein; Soviet Union
1956 Melbourne	Vasily Borisov; Soviet Union	Allan Erdman; Soviet Union	Vilho Ylönen; Finland
1960 Rome	Hubert Hammerer; Austria	Hans Rudolf Spillmann; Switzerland	Vasily Borisov; Soviet Union
1964 Tokyo	Gary Anderson; United States	Shota Kveliashvili; Soviet Union	Martin Gunnarsson; United States
1968 Mexico City (mixed)	Gary Anderson; United States	Valentin Kornev; Soviet Union	Kurt Müller; Switzerland
1972 Munich (mixed)	Lones Wigger; United States	Boris Melnik; Soviet Union	Lajos Papp; Hungary

==== Multiple medalists ====
Rank	Athlete	Nation	Olympics	Gold	Silver	Bronze	Total
1	Gary Anderson	United States	1964–1968	2	0	0	2
2	Vasily Borisov	Soviet Union	1956–1960	1	0	1	2
3	Niels Larsen	Denmark	1912–1920	0	1	1	2

==== Medalists by nation ====
Rank	Nation	Gold	Silver	Bronze	Total
1	United States	4	1	1	6
2	Soviet Union	2	4	2	8
3	Switzerland	2	2	1	5
4	Norway	1	0	4	5
5	Austria	1	0	0	1
5	France	1	0	0	1
7	Denmark	0	3	1	4
8	Finland	0	1	1	2
9	Belgium	0	0	1	1
9	Hungary	0	0	1	1

== 300 m free rifle ==
=== Men ===
Games	Gold	Silver	Bronze
1896 Athens	Georgios Orphanidis; Greece	Ioannis Frangoudis; Greece	Viggo Jensen; Denmark

== 300 m rifle kneeling ==
=== Men ===
Games	Gold	Silver	Bronze
1900 Paris	Konrad Stäheli; Switzerland	Emil Kellenberger; Switzerland Anders Peter Nielsen; Denmark	Not awarded

== 300 m rifle prone ==
=== Men ===
Games	Gold	Silver	Bronze
1900 Paris	Achille Paroche; France	Anders Peter Nielsen; Denmark	Ole Østmo; Norway

== 300 m rifle standing ==
=== Men ===
Games	Gold	Silver	Bronze
1900 Paris	Lars Jørgen Madsen; Denmark	Ole Østmo; Norway	Charles Paumier; Belgium

== 300 m rifle team ==
=== Men ===
Games	Gold	Silver	Bronze
1900 Paris	Emil Kellenberger, Franz Böckli, Konrad Stäheli, Louis Richardet, Alfred Grütter; Switzerland	Ole Østmo, Helmer Hermandsen, Tom Seeberg, Ole Sæther, Olaf Frydenlund; Norway	Achille Paroche, Auguste Cavadini, Léon Moreaux, Maurice Lecoq, René Thomas; France
1904 St. Louis	Not held		
1908 London	Julius Braathe, Albert Helgerud, Einar Liberg, Olaf Sæther, Ole Sæther, Gudbrand Skatteboe; Norway	Per-Olof Arvidsson, Janne Gustafsson, Axel Jansson, Gustaf Adolf Jonsson, Claës Rundberg, Gustav-Adolf Sjöberg; Sweden	Eugène Balme, Albert Courquin, Raoul de Boigne, Léon Johnson, Maurice Lecoq, André Parmentier; France
1912 Stockholm	Carl Björkman, Erik Blomqvist, Mauritz Eriksson, Hugo Johansson, Gustaf Adolf Jonsson, Bernhard Larsson; Sweden	Albert Helgerud, Einar Liberg, Østen Østensen, Olaf Sæther, Ole Sæther, Gudbrand Skatteboe; Norway	Niels Andersen, Jens Hajslund, Laurits Larsen, Niels Larsen, Lars Jørgen Madsen, Ole Olsen; Denmark
1920 Antwerp	Dennis Fenton, Morris Fisher, Willis A. Lee, Carl Osburn, Lloyd Spooner; United States	Albert Helgerud, Otto Olsen, Østen Østensen, Gudbrand Skatteboe, Olaf Sletten; Norway	Gustave Amoudruz, Ulrich Fahrner, Fritz Kuchen, Werner Schneeberger, Bernard Siegenthaler; Switzerland

==== Multiple medalists ====
Rank	Athlete	Nation	Olympics	Gold	Silver	Bronze	Total
1	Ole Sæther	Norway	1900, 1908–1912	1	2	0	3
1	Albert Helgerud	Norway	1908–1920	1	2	0	3
1	Gudbrand Skatteboe	Norway	1908–1920	1	2	0	3
4	Gustaf Adolf Jonsson	Sweden	1908–1912	1	1	0	2
4	Einar Liberg	Norway	1908–1912	1	1	0	2
4	Olaf Sæther	Norway	1908–1912	1	1	0	2
7	Østen Østensen	Norway	1912–1920	0	2	0	2

==== Medalists by nation ====
Rank	Nation	Gold	Silver	Bronze	Total
1	Norway	1	3	0	3
2	Sweden	1	1	0	2
3	Switzerland	1	0	1	2
4	United States	1	0	0	1
5	France	0	0	2	2
6	Denmark	0	0	1	1

== 600 m rifle ==
=== Men ===
Games	Gold	Silver	Bronze
1912 Stockholm	Paul Colas; France	Carl Osburn; United States	John Jackson; United States

== 600 m rifle prone ==
=== Men ===
Games	Gold	Silver	Bronze
1920 Antwerp	Morris Fisher; United States	Carl Osburn; United States	Niels Larsen; Denmark

== 1000 yd rifle ==
=== Men ===
Games	Gold	Silver	Bronze
1908 London	Joshua Millner; Great Britain	Kellogg Casey; United States	Maurice Blood; Great Britain
