= Shooting at the 1912 Summer Olympics – Men's 600 metre free rifle =

Olympic shooting event

Men's 600 metre free rifle at the Games of the V Olympiad
- Venue: Kaknäs
- Date: 1 July 1912
- Competitors: 85 from 12 nations

Medalists
1st place, gold medalist(s)		Paul Colas	France
2nd place, silver medalist(s)		Carl Osburn	United States
3rd place, bronze medalist(s)		John Jackson	United States

The men's 600 metre free rifle was a shooting sports event held as part of the Shooting at the 1912 Summer Olympics programme. It was the only appearance of the event, though a 1000-yard free rifle event was held in 1908 and a 600-metre prone event was held in 1924. The competition was held on Monday, 1 July 1912.

Eighty-five sport shooters from twelve nations competed.

== Results ==
Place	Shooter	Score	Shoot-off
1	Paul Colas (FRA)	94	91
2	Carl Osburn (USA)	94	90
3	John Jackson (USA)	93	90
4	Allan Briggs (USA)	93	89
5	Philip Plater (GBR)	90	
6	Werner Jernström (SWE)	88	
7	Harcourt Ommundsen (GBR)	88	
8	Cornelius Burdette (USA)	87	
9	Arthur Fulton (GBR)	87	
10	Henry Burr (GBR)	87	
11	Karl Wallenborg (SWE)	87	
12	Harry Adams (USA)	86	
13	James Reid (GBR)	86	
14	Warren Sprout (USA)	85	
15	Emil Gustafsson (SWE)	85	
16	Edward Skilton (GBR)	85	
17	Ole Degnæs (NOR)	84	
18	Edward Parnell (GBR)	84	
19	Harold Bartlett (USA)	83	
20	Louis Percy (FRA)	83	
21	George Harvey (RSA)	83	
22	Frangiskos Mavrommatis (GRE)	82	
23	Hugo Johansson (SWE)	82	
24	Carl-Johan Sund (SWE)	82	
25	Tönnes Björkman (SWE)	81	
26	Frederick Hird (USA)	81	
27	Fleetwood Varley (GBR)	81	
28	Erik Ohlsson (SWE)	81	
29	Leon Lagerlöf (SWE)	81	
30	Arne Sunde (NOR)	80	
31	John Sedgewick (GBR)	80	
32	William McDonnell (USA)	80	
33	Philip Richardson (GBR)	79	
34	Ioannis Theofilakis (GRE)	79	
35	Hans Nordvik (NOR)	79	
36	Robert Jonsson (SWE)	79	
37	Robert Davies (GBR)	78	
38	Mauritz Eriksson (SWE)	77	
39	Konstantin Kalinin (RUS)	77	
40	Gudbrand Skatteboe (NOR)	77	
41	Thomas Refsum (NOR)	76	
42	Charles Jeffreys (RSA)	76	
43	Albert Johnstone (RSA)	75	
44	Hans Schultz (DEN)	75	
45	Pavel Valden (RUS)	75	
46	John Somers (GBR)	74	
47	Albert Helgerud (NOR)	74	
48	Rasmus Friis (DEN)	74	
49	Ruben Örtegren (SWE)	74	
50	Raoul de Boigne (FRA)	73	
51	Davids Weiss (RUS)	73	
52	Nikolaos Levidis (GRE)	73	
53	Robert Patterson (RSA)	73	
54	Robert Bodley (RSA)	73	
55	Ragnvald Maseng (NOR)	73	
56	Ole Jensen (NOR)	73	
57	Paul Vighals (NOR)	72	
58	Osvald Rechke (RUS)	71	
59	Dmitry Kuskov (RUS)	71	
60	Olaf Sæther (NOR)	70	
61	Georgi de Davydov (RUS)	70	
62	Aleksandr Tillo (RUS)	70	
63	Auguste Marion (FRA)	69	
64	Daniel Mérillon (FRA)	69	
65	Boris Belinsky (RUS)	69	
66	Torsten Nyström (SWE)	69	
67	Harald Ekwall (CHI)	67	
68	Alexandros Theofilakis (GRE)	66	
69	Pierre Gentil (FRA)	65	
70	Pavel Lesh (RUS)	62	
71	Aleksandr Dobrzhansky (RUS)	61	
72	Félix Alegría (CHI)	61	
73	Rezső Velez (HUN)	60	
74	Feofan Lebedev (RUS)	59	
75	Alfred Thielemann (NOR)	57	
76	Aladár Farkas (HUN)	56	
77	Georgy Vishnyakov (RUS)	56	
78	Zoltán Jelenffy (HUN)	54	
79	Géza Mészöly (HUN)	54	
80	Emil Bömches (HUN)	51	
81	Johann Dulnig (AUT)	41	
82	Søren Christensen Bough (NOR)	40	
83	László Hauler (HUN)	35	
84	Athanase Sartori (FRA)	32	
85	Iakovos Theofilas (GRE)	13	
