= Shooting at the 1912 Summer Olympics – Men's 300 metre military rifle, three positions =

Olympic shooting event

Men's 300 metre military rifle, three positions at the Games of the V Olympiad
- Venue: Kaknäs
- Date: 1 July 1912
- Competitors: 91 from 12 nations

Medalists
1st place, gold medalist(s)		Sándor Prokopp	Hungary
2nd place, silver medalist(s)		Carl Osburn	United States
3rd place, bronze medalist(s)		Engebret Skogen	Norway

The men's 300 metre military rifle from three positions (originally called individual competition with army rifle) was a shooting sports event held as part of the Shooting at the 1912 Summer Olympics programme. It was the second appearance of the event, which had been introduced in 1908. The competition was held on Monday, 1 July 1912.

Ninety-one sport shooters from twelve nations competed.

== Results ==
Place	Shooter	Score	Shoot-off
1	Sándor Prokopp (HUN)	97	
2	Carl Osburn (USA)	95	99
3	Engebret Skogen (NOR)	95	91
4	Nikolaos Levidis (GRE)	95	70
5	Nils Romander (SWE)	94	
6	Arthur Fulton (GBR)	92	
7	Rezső Velez (HUN)	92	
8	Carl Flodström (SWE)	91	
9	Harold Bartlett (USA)	90	
10	George Harvey (RSA)	90	
11	Pavel Valden (RUS)	89	
12	Harry Adams (USA)	89	
13	Ernest Keeley (RSA)	89	
14	Tönnes Björkman (SWE)	88	
15	Julius Braathe (NOR)	88	
16	Gustaf Adolf Jonsson (SWE)	88	
17	Frangiskos Mavrommatis (GRE)	87	
18	Per-Olof Arvidsson (SWE)	87	
19	Erik Jonsson (SWE)	86	
20	Per Stridfeldt (SWE)	86	
21	Erik Ohlsson (SWE)	86	
22	Paul Colas (FRA)	86	
23	Louis Percy (FRA)	85	
24	Aladár von Farkas (HUN)	85	
25	Allan Briggs (USA)	85	
26	Georgy Vishnyakov (RUS)	84	
27	László Hauler (HUN)	84	
28	Frederick Hird (USA)	84	
29	Géza Mészöly (HUN)	83	
30	Pavel Lesh (RUS)	83	
31	William McDonnell (USA)	82	
32	Johann Dulnig (AUT)	82	
33	John Jackson (USA)	82	
34	Charles Jeffreys (RSA)	82	
35	Mathias Glomnes (NOR)	82	
36	Hans Schultz (DEN)	82	
37	Warren Sprout (USA)	81	
38	John Sedgewick (GBR)	81	
39	Robert Davies (GBR)	81	
40	Torsten Nyström (SWE)	81	
41	Johannes Jordell (NOR)	80	
42	Feofan Lebedev (RUS)	80	
43	Harald Ekwall (CHI)	80	
44	Arne Sunde (NOR)	80	
45	Robert Bodley (RSA)	78	
46	Boris Belinsky (RUS)	78	
47	Osvald Rechke (RUS)	78	
48	Félix Alegría (CHI)	77	
49	Dmitry Kuskov (RUS)	77	
50	Fleetwood Varley (GBR)	76	
51	Aleksandr Tillo (RUS)	76	
52	Cornelius Burdette (USA)	75	
53	Werner Jernström (SWE)	75	
54	John Somers (GBR)	75	
55	Albert Helgerud (NOR)	75	
56	Edward Parnell (GBR)	75	
57	Langford Lloyd (GBR)	74	
58	Raoul de Boigne (FRA)	73	
59	Robert Patterson (RSA)	72	
60	Dāvids Veiss (RUS)	72	
61	Pierre Gentil (FRA)	71	
62	Herman Skjerven (NOR)	71	
63	Niels Larsen (DEN)	70	
64	Arvid Hoflund (SWE)	70	
65	Philip Richardson (GBR)	69	
66	Emil Bömches (HUN)	69	
67	Alexandros Theofilakis (GRE)	69	
68	Georgy de Davydov (RUS)	68	
69	William McClure (GBR)	68	
70	Maxime Landin (FRA)	67	
71	Aleksandr Dobrzhansky (RUS)	66	
72	Iakovos Theofilas (GRE)	66	
73	George Whelan (RSA)	64	
74	Povl Gerlow (DEN)	64	
75	Ioannis Theofilakis (GRE)	63	
76	Alfred Thielemann (NOR)	62	
77	Albert Johnstone (RSA)	62	
78	Daniel Mérillon (FRA)	62	
79	Konstantin Kalinin (RUS)	62	
80	Ole Bjerke (NOR)	61	
81	Johannes Espelund (NOR)	60	
82	Birger Lie (NOR)	59	
83	Karl Wallenborg (SWE)	56	
84	Arthur Smith (RSA)	56	
85	István Prihoda (HUN)	49	
86	Philip Plater (GBR)	49	
87	Zoltán Jelenffy (HUN)	48	
88	Spyridon Mostras (GRE)	44	
89	Carl Veidahl (NOR)	40	
90	Athanase Sartori (FRA)	38	
91	Béla Darányi (HUN)	12	
