= Shooting at the 1912 Summer Olympics – Men's 300 metre free rifle, three positions =

Olympic shooting event

Men's 300 metre free rifle, three positions at the Games of the V Olympiad
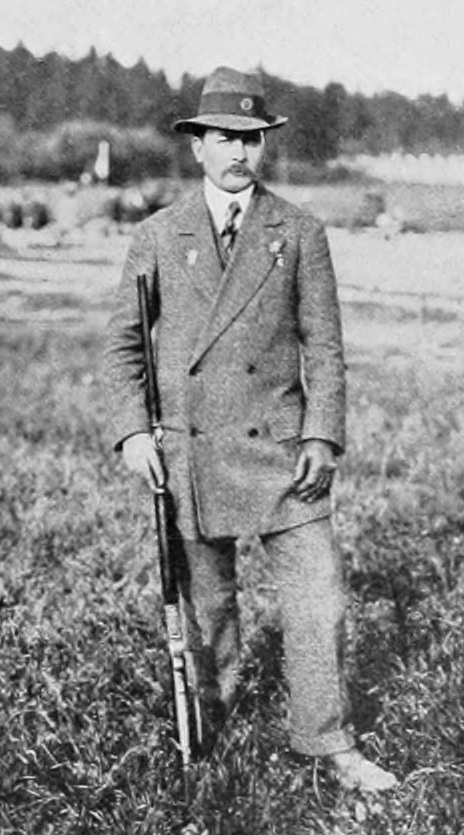
- Paul Colas
- Venue: Kaknäs
- Date: 2 July 1912
- Competitors: 84 from 9 nations
- Winning score: 987 OR

Medalists
1st place, gold medalist(s)		Paul Colas; France
2nd place, silver medalist(s)		Lars Jørgen Madsen; Denmark
3rd place, bronze medalist(s)		Niels Larsen; Denmark

The men's 300 m rifle three positions was a shooting sports event held as part of the shooting at the 1912 Summer Olympics programme. It was the third appearance of the event, which had been introduced in 1900. The competition was held on Tuesday, 2 July 1912. Eighty-four sport shooters from nine nations competed. The event was won by Paul Colas of France, the nation's first medal in the event. Denmark took the silver and bronze medals, as Lars Jørgen Madsen (in his third time competing in the event) finished second and Niels Larsen placed third.

== Background ==
This was the third appearance of the men's 300 metre three-positions rifle event, which was held 11 times between 1900 and 1972. Lars Jørgen Madsen of Denmark, who had taken fifth in 1900 and 14th in 1908, was competing once again. Other veterans of the 1908 Games competing again included the four Norwegians from the top 10 in 1908: gold medalist Albert Helgerud, bronze medalist Ole Sæther, sixth-place finisher Julius Braathe, and ninth-place finisher Olaf Sæther. Léon Johnson of France, the eighth-place finisher, also returned. None of the world champions competed.

Russia and South Africa made their debut in the event. Denmark, France, and Norway each made their third appearance, the only nations to have competed at every appearance of the event to date.

== Competition format ==
The competition had each shooter fire 120 shots, 40 shots in each of three positions: prone, kneeling, and standing. The target was 1 metre in diameter, with 10 scoring rings; targets were set at a distance of 300 metres. Thus, the maximum score possible was 1200 points. Any rifle could be used, with an open fore sight and open back sight; any ammunition could be used. Ties were broken by hits on targets, then centre hits, then 10s, then 9s, etc.

== Records ==
Prior to the competition, the existing world and Olympic records were as follows.

World record				
Olympic record	Emil Kellenberger (SUI)	930	Paris, France	5 August 1900

The top ten shooters in 1912 broke the Olympic record. Paul Colas ended with the new record, at 987 points.

== Schedule ==
Date	Time	Round
Tuesday, 2 July 1912	11:00; 16:00	Final

== Results ==
Rank	Shooter	Nation	Total	Notes
1st place, gold medalist(s)	Paul Colas	France	987	OR
2nd place, silver medalist(s)	Lars Jørgen Madsen	Denmark	981	
3rd place, bronze medalist(s)	Niels Larsen	Denmark	962	
4	Hugo Johansson	Sweden	959	
5	Gudbrand Skatteboe	Norway	956	
6	Bernhard Larsson	Sweden	954	
7	Albert Helgerud	Norway	952	
8	Tönnes Björkman	Sweden	947	
9	Ole Sæther	Norway	941	
10	Erik Blomqvist	Sweden	932	
11	Gustaf Adolf Jonsson	Sweden	928	
12	Ole Olsen	Denmark	926	
13	Voitto Kolho	Finland	923	
14	Mauritz Eriksson	Sweden	922	
15	Einar Liberg	Norway	921	
16	Christian Tauson	Denmark	921	
17	Carl Osburn	United States	915	
18	Olaf Sæther	Norway	914	
19	Gustaf Nyman	Finland	913	
20	Werner Jernström	Sweden	912	
21	Cornelius Burdette	United States	912	
22	Paul Vighals	Norway	911	
23	Østen Østensen	Norway	911	
24	Léon Johnson	France	908	
25	Heikki Huttunen	Finland	906	
26	Thomas Refsum	Norway	905	
27	Olaf Husby	Norway	905	
28	Harry Adams	United States	903	
29	Julius Braathe	Norway	900	
30	Arne Sunde	Norway	900	
31	Engebret Skogen	Norway	899	
32	Warren Sprout	United States	896	
33	Laurits Larsen	Denmark	894	
34	Carl Björkman	Sweden	888	
35	Allan Briggs	United States	888	
36	Harold Bartlett	United States	884	
37	Robert Jonsson	Sweden	875	
38	Frederick Hird	United States	875	
39	Huvi Tuiskunen	Finland	875	
40	George Harvey	South Africa	874	
41	Vilho Vauhkonen	Finland	870	
42	August Wikström	Sweden	870	
43	Nils Skog	Sweden	869	
44	Louis Percy	France	868	
45	Auguste Marion	France	868	
46	Frants Nielsen	Denmark	851	
47	Anders Peter Nielsen	Denmark	849	
48	Per-Olof Arvidsson	Sweden	839	
49	Emil Holm	Finland	835	
50	Emil Bömches	Hungary	828	
51	Robert Patterson	South Africa	810	
52	Hans Schultz	Denmark	808	
53	Raoul de Boigne	France	806	
54	Feofan Lebedev	Russia	806	
55	Robert Bodley	South Africa	806	
56	Ernest Keeley	South Africa	800	
57	Lauri Kolho	Finland	787	
58	Dmitry Kuskov	Russia	780	
59	Jalo Autonen	Finland	776	
60	Povl Gerlow	Denmark	772	
61	George Whelan	South Africa	762	
62	Pavel Valden	Russia	758	
63	Athanase Sartori	France	754	
64	Arthur Smith	South Africa	752	
65	Boris Belinsky	Russia	746	
66	Aleksandr Tillo	Russia	744	
67	Albert Johnstone	South Africa	741	
68	Konstantin Kalinin	Russia	736	
69	Zoltán Jelenffy	Hungary	718	
70	Charles Jeffreys	South Africa	715	
71	Pavel Lesh	Russia	713	
72	Rezső Velez	Hungary	712	
73	Osvald Rechke	Russia	699	
74	László Hauler	Hungary	677	
75	Aladár von Farkas	Hungary	653	
76	Georgy de Davydov	Russia	635	
77	Dāvids Veiss	Russia	623	
78	Aleksandr Dobrzhansky	Russia	463	
—	Hans Denver	Denmark	DNF	
—	Pierre Gentil	France	DNF	
—	Jens Hajslund	Denmark	DNF	
—	Géza Mészöly	Hungary	DNF	
—	István Prihoda	Hungary	DNF	
—	Nestori Toivonen	Finland	DNF	
