= Shooting at the 1912 Summer Olympics – Men's team rifle =

1912 Olympic Shooting Events

Men's team rifle at the Games of the V Olympiad
- Venue: Kaknäs
- Date: 29 June 1912
- Competitors: 60 from 10 nations

Medalists
1st place, gold medalist(s)		United States; Harry Adams, Allan Briggs, Cornelius Burdette, John Jackson, Carl Osburn, Warren Sprout
2nd place, silver medalist(s)		Great Britain; Henry Burr, Arthur Fulton, Harcourt Ommundsen, Edward Parnell, James Reid, Edward Skilton
3rd place, bronze medalist(s)		Sweden; Carl Björkman, Tönnes Björkman, Mauritz Eriksson, Werner Jernström, Hugo Johansson, Bernhard Larsson

The men's team rifle was a shooting sports event held as part of the Shooting at the 1912 Summer Olympics programme. It was the second appearance of the event. The competition was held on Saturday, 29 June 1912.

Sixty sport shooters from ten nations competed.

== Results ==
Place	Team	Ind. score	Team score
1	United States		1687
1	Cornelius Burdette	288	1687
1	Allan Briggs	283	1687
1	Harry Adams	283	1687
1	John Jackson	279	1687
1	Carl Osburn	278	1687
1	Warren Sprout	276	1687
2	Great Britain		1602
2	Harcourt Ommundsen	276	1602
2	Henry Burr	266	1602
2	Edward Skilton	266	1602
2	James Reid	266	1602
2	Edward Parnell	266	1602
2	Arthur Fulton	262	1602
3	Sweden		1570
3	Mauritz Eriksson	266	1570
3	Werner Jernström	262	1570
3	Tönnes Björkman	261	1570
3	Carl Björkman	261	1570
3	Bernhard Larsson	261	1570
3	Hugo Johansson	259	1570
4	South Africa		1531
4	George Harvey	258	1531
4	Robert Bodley	256	1531
4	Arthur Smith	256	1531
4	Ernest Keeley	255	1531
4	Charles Jeffreys	254	1531
4	Robert Patterson	252	1531
5	France		1515
5	Louis Percy	263	1515
5	Paul Colas	262	1515
5	Raoul de Boigne	262	1515
5	Pierre Gentil	257	1515
5	Léon Johnson	240	1515
5	Maxime Landin	231	1515
6	Norway		1473
6	Ole Degnæs	268	1473
6	Arne Sunde	253	1473
6	Ole Jensen	248	1473
6	Hans Nordvik	242	1473
6	Olaf Husby	233	1473
6	Mathias Glomnes	229	1473
7	Greece		1445
7	Frangiskos Mavrommatis	261	1445
7	Alexandros Theofilakis	258	1445
7	Ioannis Theofilakis	249	1445
7	Nikolaos Levidis	231	1445
7	Iakovos Theofilas	229	1445
7	Spyridon Mostras	217	1445
8	Denmark		1419
8	Niels Andersen	250	1419
8	Lars Jørgen Madsen	247	1419
8	Hans Schultz	244	1419
8	Niels Larsen	237	1419
8	Jens Hajslund	223	1419
8	Rasmus Friis	218	1419
9	Russian Empire		1403
9	Pavel Valden	251	1403
9	Dmitry Kuskov	246	1403
9	Feofan Lebedev	237	1403
9	Davids Weiss	226	1403
9	Aleksandr Tillo	226	1403
9	Georgi de Davydov	217	1403
10	Hungary		1333
10	Emil Bömches	237	1333
10	István Prihoda	227	1333
10	Rezső Velez	226	1333
10	László Hauler	219	1333
10	Géza Mészöly	217	1333
10	Aladár Farkas	207	1333
