= Shooting at the 1912 Summer Olympics – Men's 300 metre free rifle, team =

Olympic shooting event

Men's team free rifle at the Games of the V Olympiad
- Shooting pictogram
- Venue: Kaknäs
- Date: 4 July 1912
- Competitors: 42 from 7 nations
- Winning score: 5655

Medalists
1st place, gold medalist(s)		Sweden: Carl Björkman; Erik Blomqvist; Mauritz Eriksson; Hugo Johansson; Gustaf Adolf Jonsson; Bernhard Larsson
2nd place, silver medalist(s)		Norway: Albert Helgerud; Einar Liberg; Østen Østensen; Olaf Sæther; Ole Sæther; Gudbrand Skatteboe
3rd place, bronze medalist(s)		Denmark: Niels Andersen; Jens Hajslund; Laurits Larsen; Niels Larsen; Lars Jørgen Madsen; Ole Olsen

The men's 300 metre team free rifle was a shooting sports event held as part of the Shooting at the 1912 Summer Olympics programme. It was the third appearance of the event. The competition was held on Thursday, 4 July 1912. Forty-two sport shooters from seven nations competed. The event was won by Sweden, the nation's first victory in the event, improving on a silver-medal performance in 1908. Defending champions Norway reached the podium for the third consecutive time, taking silver this time. Denmark earned its first medal in the men's 300 metre team free rifle with bronze.

Ole Sæther had been a member of Norway's two prior teams as well, so became the first man with three medals in the event. He had been the only man with multiple medals; five others (Albert Helgerud, Gudbrand Skatteboe, Einar Liberg, and Olaf Sæther of Norway and Gustaf Adolf Jonsson of Sweden) each earned their second in 1912.

== Background ==
This was the third appearance of the men's 300 metre team rifle event, which was held 4 times between 1900 and 1920.

South Africa and the Russian Empire each made their debut in the event. Denmark, France, and Norway each made their third appearance, having competed in each edition of the event to date.

== Competition format ==
The competition had each shooter fire 120 shots, 40 shots in each of three positions: prone, kneeling, and standing. The target was 1 metre in diameter, with 10 scoring rings; targets were set at a distance of 300 metres. The six team members' scores were then summed. Thus, the maximum score possible was 7200 points. The scores for the team event were separate from the individual event this time.

== Schedule ==
Date	Time	Round
Thursday, 4 July 1912	11:00	Final

== Results ==
Rank	Nation	Shooter	Score
1st place, gold medalist(s)	Sweden	Sweden total	5655
1st place, gold medalist(s)	Sweden	Mauritz Eriksson	976
1st place, gold medalist(s)	Sweden	Hugo Johansson	975
1st place, gold medalist(s)	Sweden	Erik Blomqvist	962
1st place, gold medalist(s)	Sweden	Carl Björkman	954
1st place, gold medalist(s)	Sweden	Bernhard Larsson	914
1st place, gold medalist(s)	Sweden	Gustaf Adolf Jonsson	874
2nd place, silver medalist(s)	Norway	Norway total	5602
2nd place, silver medalist(s)	Norway	Gudbrand Skatteboe	945
2nd place, silver medalist(s)	Norway	Ole Sæther	945
2nd place, silver medalist(s)	Norway	Østen Østensen	940
2nd place, silver medalist(s)	Norway	Albert Helgerud	938
2nd place, silver medalist(s)	Norway	Olaf Sæther	935
2nd place, silver medalist(s)	Norway	Einar Liberg	902
3rd place, bronze medalist(s)	Denmark	Denmark total	5570
3rd place, bronze medalist(s)	Denmark	Ole Olsen	983
3rd place, bronze medalist(s)	Denmark	Lars Jørgen Madsen	973
3rd place, bronze medalist(s)	Denmark	Niels Larsen	931
3rd place, bronze medalist(s)	Denmark	Niels Andersen	896
3rd place, bronze medalist(s)	Denmark	Laurits Larsen	890
3rd place, bronze medalist(s)	Denmark	Jens Hajslund	856
4	France	France total	5471
4	France	Paul Colas	1004
4	France	Louis Percy	931
4	France	Léon Johnson	908
4	France	Pierre Gentil	899
4	France	Raoul de Boigne	874
4	France	Auguste Marion	855
5	Finland	Finland total	5323
5	Finland	Voitto Kolho	951
5	Finland	Heikki Huttunen	946
5	Finland	Gustaf Nyman	897
5	Finland	Emil Holm	845
5	Finland	Huvi Tuiskunen	844
5	Finland	Vilho Vauhkonen	840
6	South Africa	South Africa total	4897
6	South Africa	George Harvey	887
6	South Africa	Robert Bodley	857
6	South Africa	Robert Patterson	839
6	South Africa	Arthur Smith	821
6	South Africa	Ernest Keeley	812
6	South Africa	George Whelan	681
7	Russian Empire	Russian Empire total	4892
7	Russian Empire	Pavel Valden	860
7	Russian Empire	Feofan Lebedev	827
7	Russian Empire	Aleksandr Tillo	822
7	Russian Empire	Dmitry Kuskov	811
7	Russian Empire	Konstantin Kalinin	803
7	Russian Empire	Pavel Lesh	769
