= Arthur Fulton (sport shooter) =

British sport shooter (1887–1972)

Arthur Fulton MBE DCM
- Photographed in France, probably May 1915

Personal information
- Full name: Arthur George Fulton
- Born: 16 September 1887 Battersea, London, England
- Died: 26 January 1972 (aged 84) Pirbright, Surrey, England
- Military career
- Allegiance: United Kingdom
- Branch: British Army
- Rank: Sergeant
- Unit: Queen's Westminsters
- Wars: First World War
- Awards: Distinguished Conduct Medal; Victory Medal (United Kingdom); 1914 Star; British War Medal

Sport
- Sport: Sports shooting
Medal record
Men's shooting
Representing Great Britain
Olympic Games
Silver medal – second place	1908 London	Team military rifle
Silver medal – second place	1912 Stockholm	Team military rifle

Arthur George Fulton MBE DCM (16 September 1887 – 26 January 1972) was a British sport shooter who competed at the 1908 Summer Olympics and 1912 Summer Olympics. He was the first person to win the prestigious King's Prize at Bisley three times, a record not matched until 1996 – over twenty years after his death.

At the 1908 Olympics, Fulton won a silver medal in the team military rifle event. Four years later, he won the silver medal in the team military rifle event, was sixth in the 300 metre military rifle, three positions event and placed ninth in the 600 metre free rifle event. He won his first King's Prize in 1912, and placed second in the same competition in 1914. During the First World War, he served as a machine-gunner and sniper, and was awarded the Distinguished Conduct Medal (DCM) for gallantry. For most of his life, he worked in the armourer's shop established by his father, George Edmonton Fulton, at Bisley Camp, the centre of British rifle shooting.

Fulton won the King's Prize again in 1926 and in 1931. During the Second World War, he served as an officer in the Home Guard. He was made a Member of the Order of the British Empire (MBE) in 1959 for services to shooting. On his death, he was described in the shooting press as "the most famous rifle shot the world has ever known".

== Early life ==
Arthur George Fulton was the second child of Isabella Savage and her husband, the wood-engraver and noted marksman George Edmonton Fulton. (Note: Walter 2019. For the place, see also The London Evening Standard, 24 July 1914; for George Fulton's trade, see Tames 2005, p. 63.) He was born on 16 September 1887 in their house at 57 Rosenau Road, Battersea, London. Arthur's elder sister, Ethel, had been born in 1886. The year after Arthur was born, George Fulton, a soldier then in the Middlesex Regiment of the part-time Volunteer Force, (Note: George Fulton later became the armourer for the Queen's Westminsters.) won the Queen's Prize, the most prestigious trophy in British rifle shooting. (Note: Rennick 2004; The Daily Telegraph, 22 July 1912: "Private Arthur G. Fulton, of the Queen's Westminsters, secured the honour this year of King's Prizeman at Bisley. His father, who was the armourer of the same regiment, won the coveted distinction in the shooting world in 1888.") He subsequently used the prize money he had earned from shooting to establish an armourer's shop in Wandsworth around the year 1895. (Note: Gregory 2006, p. xxiv; "The Fulton Family". Fulton's of Bisley.)

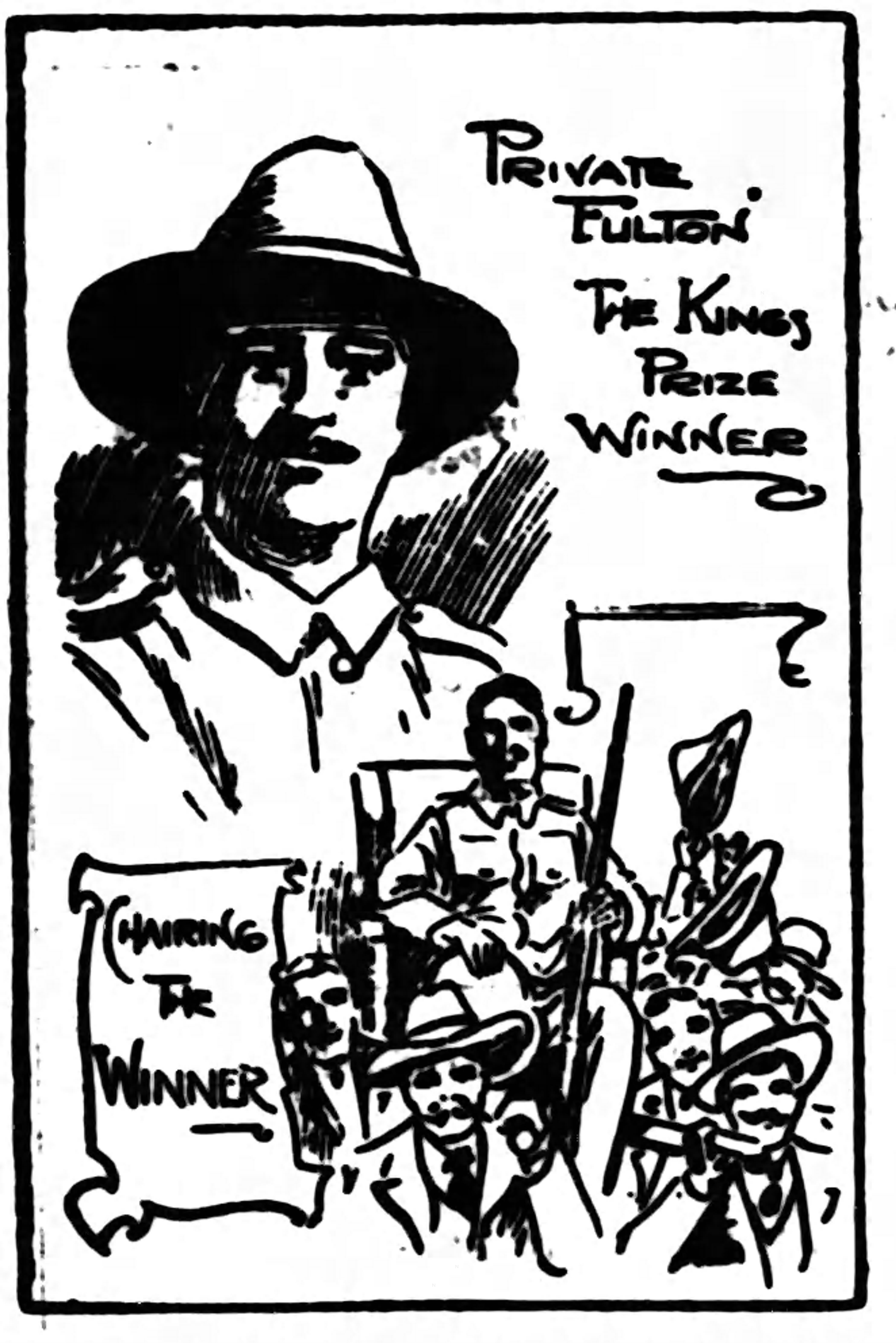
Illustration from The Ashbourne Telegraph of Arthur Fulton being "chaired" from the range after winning the King's Prize in 1912

Fulton followed his father into the Volunteer Force and joined the Queen's Westminsters in 1904. In 1905, George Fulton moved his shop to the newly-opened headquarters of the National Rifle Association at Bisley in Surrey; Arthur began to work for him at the same time and first competed in the shooting competitions at Bisley in that year. (Note: "The Fulton Family". Fulton's of Bisley.. For Arthur Fulton's first appearance at Bisley, see Liverpool Daily Post (Welsh Edition), 21 July 1962.) At the 1908 London Olympics, Arthur won a silver medal in the team military rifle event. Four years later, at the games in Stockholm, he won the silver medal in the team military rifle event, was sixth in the 300 metre three-position military rifle event and ninth in the 600 metre free-rifle event. He won his first King's Prize at the 1912 Imperial Meeting, with a score of 335 out of a possible 350 points. He subsequently, in July 1914, won the second of the three stages of the King's and placed second in the final after losing a tie-breaker shoot to J. L. Dewar, having led by three points going into the third stage.

== First World War ==
Following the outbreak of the First World War in August 1914, Fulton was deployed to France with the Queen's Westminsters, which had been redesignated the 1/16th (County of London) Battalion (Queen's Westminster Rifles) and were now part of the Territorial Force. The regiment landed at Le Havre on 3 November; Fulton was recorded as entering the theatre of war with an administrative date of 1 November.

Fulton was rapidly promoted to sergeant (Note: He was a private in late July 1914, as recorded in the Daily News (London), but a sergeant in the initial stages of the war.) and initially served as a machine-gunner, but subsequently became a sniper. In this capacity, he was awarded the Distinguished Conduct Medal, Britain's second-highest military award for gallantry, and is generally considered to have made around 130 kills. His biographer, Tony Rennick, writes that Fulton was often "borrowed" by other regiments on account of his sniping skills.

Fulton married his wife, Madge, in 1916. He was recalled from active service to work alongside other pre-war target shooters with John Herschel Hardcastle, an officer of the Royal Artillery conducting experiments in ballistics and rifle design at the Royal Arsenal in Woolwich, London. (Note: Rennick 2004. For Hardcastle's unit and experiments, see David 2009.) By the war's end, Fulton had received the 1914 Star, the British War Medal and the Victory Medal. His younger brother, Frank Laurence Fulton, died of wounds at Karasouli (now Polykastro) in Greece on 17 March 1917, after being hit by mortar fire during a failed offensive towards the Vardar river.

== Later life ==
In 1920, Fulton won the first stage of the King's Prize. He worked for most of his life in the shop his father had established; he became a partner in the business in 1923. He went on to repeat his King's win in 1926, after scoring 272 points out of 300 and winning a four-way tie shoot – the first time the match had ever been tied between so many people. This made him the fourth shooter to win the Sovereign's Prize twice, and the first to have won all three of its constituent stages. By this point he had competed in fourteen Sovereign's Prize finals. (Note: The Surrey Advertiser, 24 July 1926: "For the second time Sergt H. [sic] G. Fulton, who resides at Bisley, has won the King's Prize at Bisley, ... Sergt. Fulton first won the King's Prize in 1912, and he has been in the final no fewer than 14 times.")

Fulton's third King's win came in 1931 with a score of 285 out of 300; he also won the competition's second stage. (Note: The Observer, 19 July 1931: "Sergt. Arthur Fulton, of the Queen's Westminsters, to-day won the King's Prize of £250, a gold medal and gold badge, with a score of 285 out of 300 points. In doing so he has definitely established himself as the finest marksman of recent years, for he has now won the gold medal three times, a feat never before accomplished, and also this year he won the silver medal for the highest score in the second stage.") His three-win record would not be matched until the Canadian shooter Alain Marion equalled it in 1996; as of 2025, it has yet to be surpassed. He also held the record, at twenty-eight, for the most times qualifying for the Sovereign's Final. He gained the nickname "the rifle visitor" for his frequent tours with the National Rifle Association team to Africa, Scandinavia and North America. In total, he represented Great Britain twenty times and England forty-four times, including serving as captain for the British victory in the 1959 Empire Match.

During the Second World War, Fulton joined the Home Guard as a lieutenant. His son, Robin, won the Queen's Prize in 1958. Arthur Fulton was appointed as a Member of the Order of the British Empire in the 1959 New Year Honours for services to rifle shooting. (Note: Rennick 2004; for the MBE, see United Kingdom list: "No. 41589". The London Gazette (Supplement). 30 December 1958. p. 16.) He died on 26 January 1972 at his home, Oak Tree Cottage in Pirbright, near Bisley Camp. In addition to his son, he had a daughter named Josephine. On his death, he was described in the shooting press as "the most famous rifle shot the world has ever known".

== Published works cited ==
=== Newspapers ===
- "At Home". The Daily Telegraph. 22 July 1912. p. 10.
- "Battersea Man's Big Lead at Bisley". Daily News (London). 25 July 1914. p. 5 – via British Newspaper Archive.
- "Deaths (Continued)". The Daily Telegraph. 28 January 1972. p. 32.
- "Distinguished Personage". The Brandon Sun. 2 March 1972. p. 3 – via Newspapers.com.
- "King's Prize: Keen Tie at Bisley". The Scotsman. 19 July 1926. p. 7 – via British Newspaper Archive.
- "The King's Prize – Won by Surrey Marksman". The Surrey Advertiser. 24 July 1926. p. 14 – via Newspapers.com.
- "King's Silver Medal for Fulton". The Manchester Courier. 25 July 1914. p. 8 – via British Newspaper Archive.
- "Notable King's Prize Winner". The Hull Daily Mail. 19 July 1926. p. 2 – via British Newspaper Archive.
- "Obituary: Arthur Fulton". The Daily Telegraph. 28 January 1972. p. 14 – via Newspapers.com.
- "Queen Mary's Prize: The Gold Medal Won by a Battersea Man". The London Evening Standard. 24 July 1914. p. 10 – via British Newspaper Archive.
- "Queen's Prize Final at Bisley". Liverpool Daily Post (Welsh Edition). 21 July 1962. p. 3 – via British Newspaper Archive.
- "Shooting at Bisley". Derbyshire Advertiser and Journal. 1 August 1914. p. 7 – via British Newspaper Archive.
- "Thrice Winner of the King's Prize". The Observer. 19 July 1931. p. 15.

=== Books, journals and theses ===
- Bunch, Christopher (2019). The National Rifle Association: Its Tramways and the London & South Western Railway: Targets and Tramways. Barnsley: Pen and Sword Books. ISBN 9781473891760.
- David, Thomas Rhodri Vivian (2009). British Scientists and Soldiers in the First World War (With Special Reference to Ballistics and Chemical Warfare) (PDF) (Ph.D). Imperial College, London.
- Gregory, Barry (2006). A History of the Artists Rifles 1859–1947. Barnsley: Pen and Sword Books. ISBN 9781844155033.
- Rennick, Toby (2004). "Fulton, Arthur George". Oxford Dictionary of National Biography (online ed.). Oxford University Press. doi:10.1093/ref:odnb/65175. (Subscription, Wikipedia Library access or UK public library membership required.)
- Tames, Richard (2005). Sporting London: A Race Through Time. London: Historical Publications. ISBN 9781905286065.
- Walter, John (2019). The Sniper Encyclopaedia: An A–Z Guide to World Sniping. Barnsley: Greenhill Books. ISBN 9781784382414.
