= Emil Holm =

Emil Holm may refer to:

- Emil Holm (sport shooter) (1877–1968), Finnish sport shooter
- Emil Holm (footballer) (born 2000), Swedish footballer
