= Géza Mészöly =

Géza Mészöly may refer to:

- Géza Mészöly (painter) (1844–1887), Hungarian painter
- Géza Mészöly (footballer) (born 1967), Hungarian footballer
- Géza Mészöly (sport shooter) (1876–1919), Hungarian shooter
