= Skjerven =

Skjerven is a Norwegian surname. Notable people with the surname include:

- Elsa Skjerven (1919–2005), Norwegian politician
- Herman Skjerven (1872–1952), Norwegian sport shooter
- Tommy Skjerven (born 1967), Norwegian football referee

== See also ==
- Skjerve
