= George Whelan =

George Whelan may refer to:

- George J. Whelan, mayor of San Francisco, 1856
- George Whelan (boxer) (born 1934), English boxer
- George Whelan (sport shooter) (1859–1938), South African sports shooter
- George J. Whelan, co-founder of United Cigar Stores
