= Weydahl =

Weydahl or Veydahl is a surname. It may refer to:

- Carl Weydahl or Carl Veidahl (1879–1974), Norwegian sport shooter
- Hanna-Marie Weydahl (1922–2016), Norwegian pianist

== See also ==
- Wegdahl, Minnesota, an unincorporated community in Chippewa County, in the U.S. state of Minnesota
