= John E. Jackson =

John E. Jackson may refer to:

- John Jackson (sport shooter) (1885–1971), American sport shooter
- John E. Jackson (make-up artist), American make-up artist
