= Arvid Hoflund =

Swedish sports shooter

Personal information
- Born: 12 June 1883 Eskilstuna, Sweden
- Died: 15 September 1952 (aged 69) Sala, Sweden

Sport
- Sport: Sports shooting

Arvid Hoflund (12 June 1883 – 15 September 1952) was a Swedish sports shooter. He competed in the 300m military rifle event at the 1912 Summer Olympics.
