= Sandstone, West Virginia =

Sandstone
- Unincorporated community
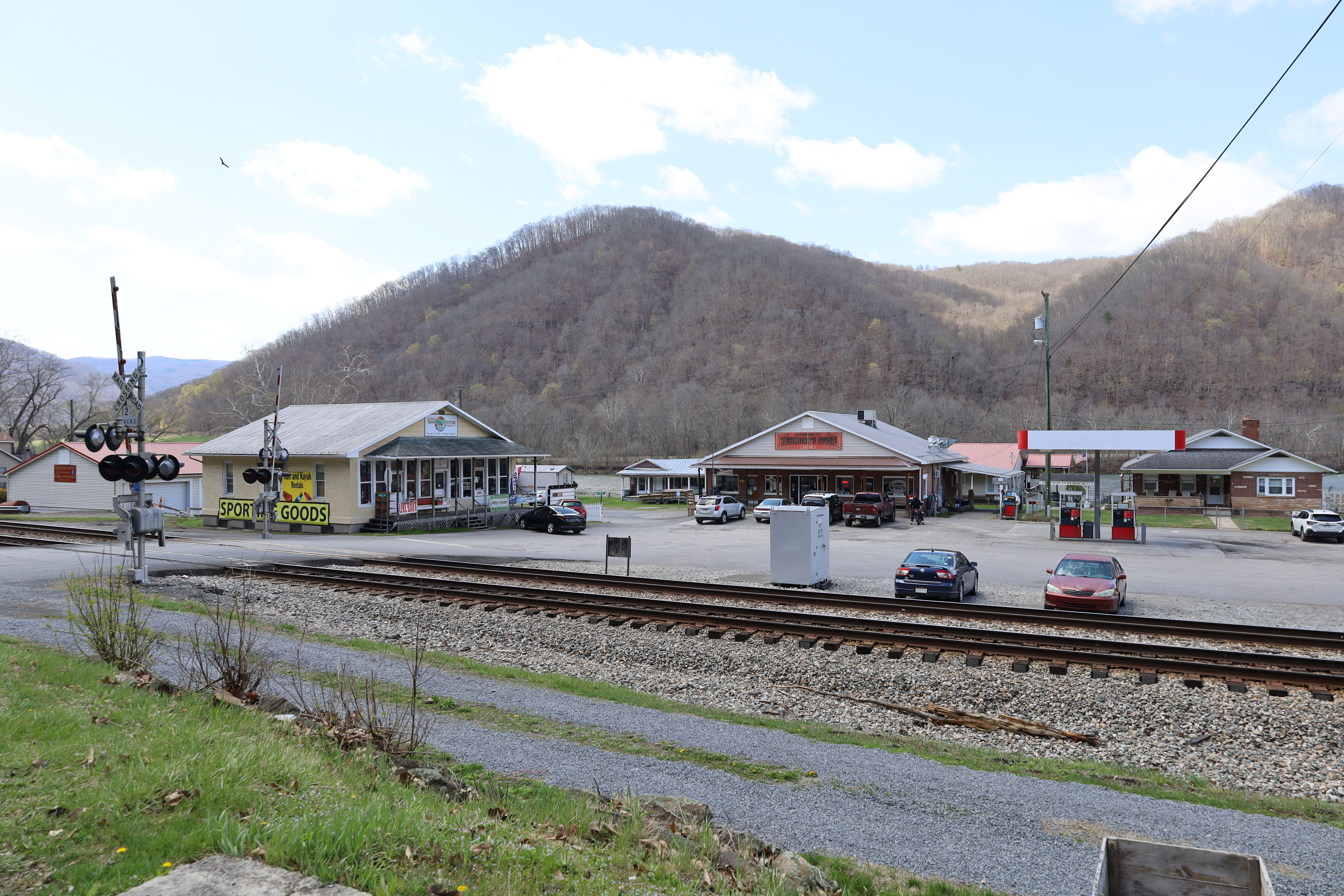
- Sandstone in 2022

- Location within the state of West Virginia Sandstone (the United States)
- Coordinates: 37°46′15″N 80°53′29″W
- Country: United States
- State: West Virginia
- County: Summers
- Elevation: 1,365 ft (416 m)
- Time zone: UTC-5 (Eastern (EST))
  - Summer (DST): UTC-4 (EDT)
- ZIP codes: 25985
- GNIS feature ID: 1546397

Sandstone (also New Richmond or New River Falls) is an unincorporated community in Summers County, West Virginia, United States. It lies along West Virginia Route 20 and the New River to the north of the city of Hinton, the county seat of Summers County. It has a post office, with the ZIP code of 25985.

Historic variant names were New River Falls and New Richmond. Sandstone takes its name from an old sandstone quarry.

Sandstone is the birthplace of Cornelius Burdette, winner of an Olympic gold medal during the 1912 Summer Olympics.

== Sandstone Falls ==
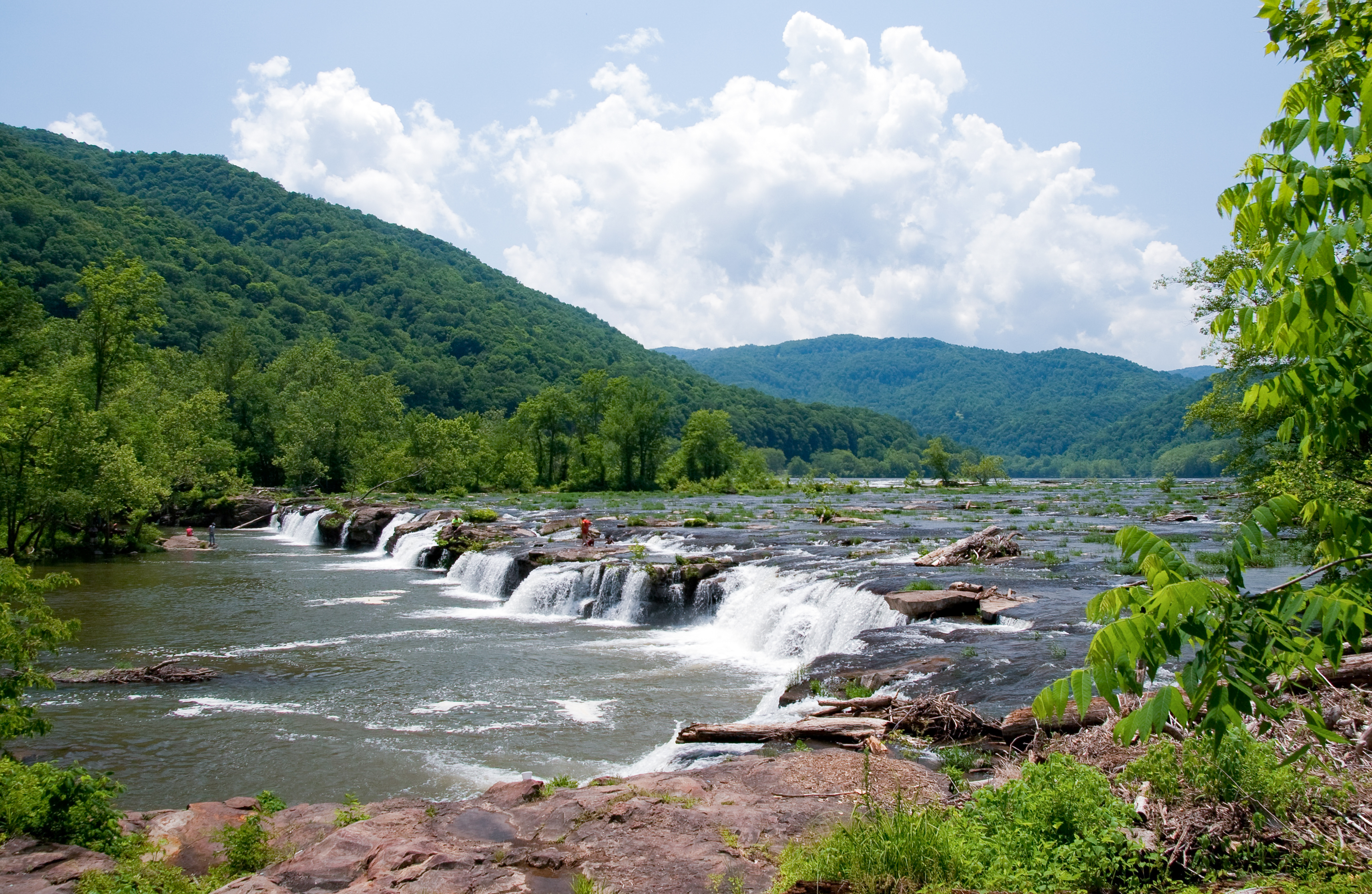
Sandstone Falls in May 2010

Sandstone Falls is located on the New River to the south of the community.

== Sandstone Visitors Center ==
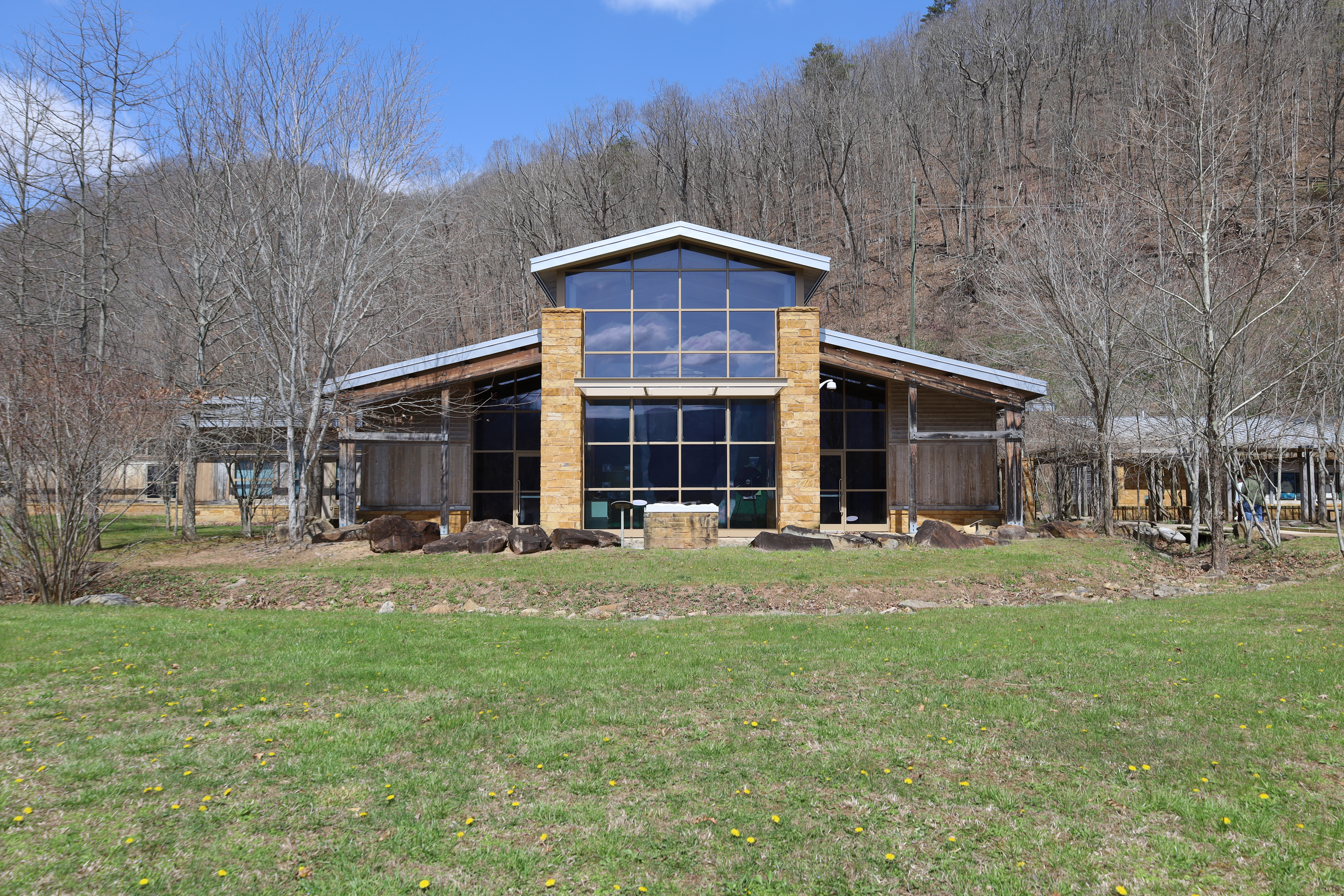
New River Gorge National Park and Preserve Sandstone Visitor Center in 2022

The Sandstone Visitors Center was built by the National Park Service in order to provide outreach and awareness to the various environmental issues along the New River Gorge. It is located one mile from the Sandstone Exit on I-64 not far from the Mary Draper Ingles crossing. The facility incorporates environmentally sustainable design features with local and recycled materials comprising its structure, and native plants in a xeriscaping project absorb rainfall and thermal heat. The center includes interactive exhibits.

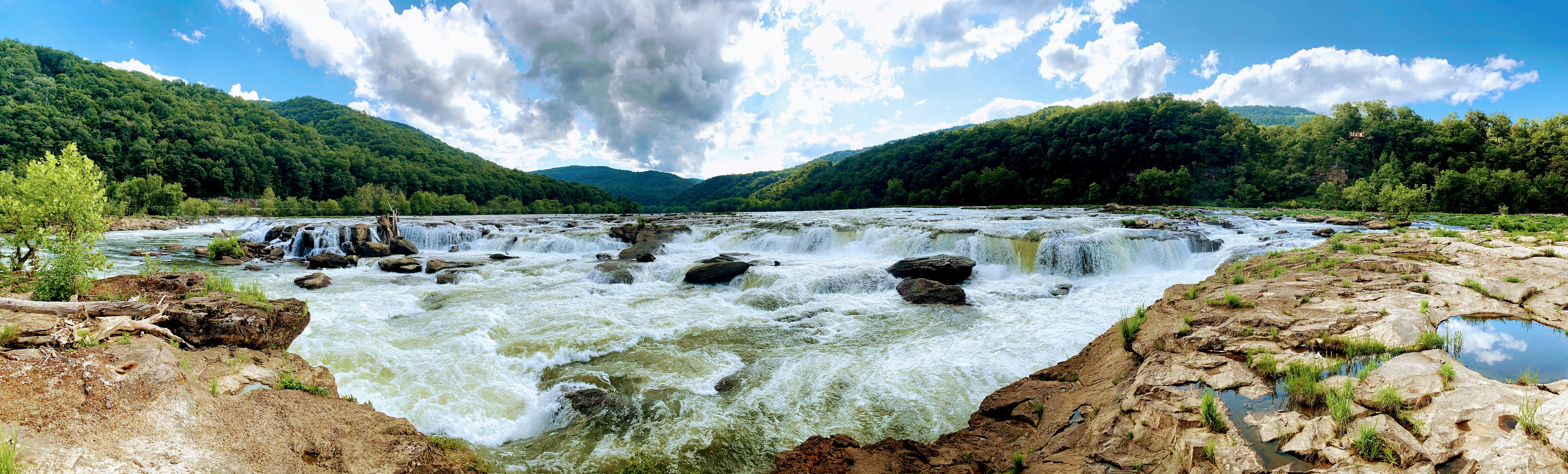
Sandstone Upper Falls, August 2020

== See also ==
- List of waterfalls
