= Harcourt Ommundsen =

British sports shooter (1878–1915)

- Born: 23 November 1878; Alloa, Clackmannanshire, Scotland
- Died: 19 September 1915 (aged 36); Belgium
- Known for: Olympic medalist

Olympic medal record

Men's Shooting
Silver medal – second place	1908 London	Team military rifle
Silver medal – second place	1912 Stockholm	Team military rifle

Arthur Norman Victor Harcourt Ommundsen (23 November 1878 – 19 September 1915) was a British sport shooter who competed in the 1908 Summer Olympics and 1912 Summer Olympics.

In the 1908 Olympics, he won a silver medal in the team military rifle event. Four years later, he won a silver medal in the team military rifle event and was seventh in the 600 metre free rifle event.

Ommundsen was killed in action during the First World War, serving as a lieutenant with the Honourable Artillery Company near Ypres. He was buried at Brandhoek Military Cemetery nearby.

== See also ==
- List of Olympians killed in World War I
