= Allan Briggs (sport shooter) =

American sport shooter (1873–1951)

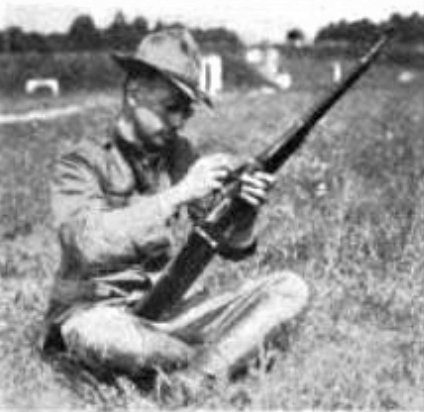

Personal information
- Born: February 14, 1873 Bridgeport, Connecticut, U.S.
- Died: November 12, 1951 (aged 78) Vineyard Haven, Massachusetts, U.S.

Sport
- Sport: Sports shooting
Medal record
Men's shooting
Representing United States
Olympic Games
Gold medal – first place	1912 Stockholm	Team military rifle

Allan Lindsay Briggs (February 14, 1873 – November 12, 1951) was an American sport shooter who competed in the 1912 Summer Olympics.

In 1912, he won the gold medal as a member of the American team in the team military rifle competition. In the 1912 Summer Olympics he also participated in the following events:

- 600 metre free rifle – fourth place
- 300 metre military rifle, three positions – 25th place
- 300 metre free rifle, three positions – 35th place

He was born in Bridgeport, Connecticut and died in Vineyard Haven, Massachusetts.
