= Shooting at the 1908 Summer Olympics – Men's stationary target small-bore rifle =

Sports shooting at the Olympics

Men's stationary target small-bore rifle at the Games of the IV Olympiad
- Venue: Bisley rifle range
- Date: 11 July 1908
- Competitors: 19 from 5 nations

Medalists
1st place, gold medalist(s)		Arthur Carnell	Great Britain
2nd place, silver medalist(s)		Harold Humby	Great Britain
3rd place, bronze medalist(s)		George Barnes	Great Britain

The men's stationary target small-bore rifle, also referred to as the miniature rifle competition, was one of 15 events on the Shooting at the 1908 Summer Olympics programme. Regulation of the equipment used in the event was done through proscribing ammunition weighing more than 140 grains, with a velocity of more than 1,450 feet per second, or having a hard metal base. Magnifying and telescopic sights were prohibited. Each shooter fired 80 shots, half at 50 yards and half at 100 yards. Maximum score for a shot was 5 points, giving a maximum total possible of 400 points.

Twelve competitors from each nation were allowed to take part. Because of a delay in the arrival of Barnes' registration, the British team registered Philip Plater as a replacement. The original registration later arrived, resulting in Britain having 13 entrants. Further confusion on the day of competition resulted in all 13 shooting, Plater going last. Plater, who had scored 391 points to place first in the event and set a world record, was ruled to have been the illegal competitor and his score was invalidated.

== Results ==
Place	Shooter	Score		
Place	Shooter	50 yd	100 yd	Total
1	Arthur Carnell (GBR)	192	195	387
2	Harold Humby (GBR)	197	189	386
3	George Barnes (GBR)	189	196	385
4	Maurice Matthews (GBR)	195	189	384
5	Edward Amoore (GBR)	194	189	383
6	William Pimm (GBR)	192	187	379
7	Archie Taylor (GBR)	189	187	376
8	Harold Hawkins (GBR)	185	189	374
9	Jack Warner (GBR)	191	182	373
10	Vilhelm Carlberg (SWE)	184	186	370
10	Arthur Wilde (GBR)	194	176	370
12	James Milne (GBR)	182	186	368
13	André Mercier (FRA)	178	188	366
14	William Milne (GBR)	183	180	363
15	Georgios Orphanidis (GRE)	180	177	357
16	William Hill (ANZ)	183	171	354
17	Léon Tétart (FRA)	176	174	350
18	Johan Hübner von Holst (SWE)	172	177	349
19	Henri Bonnefoy (FRA)	147	157	304
Ineligible	Philip Plater (GBR)	195	196	391

== Sources ==
- Cook, Theodore Andrea (1908). The Fourth Olympiad, Being the Official Report. London: British Olympic Association.
- De Wael, Herman (2001). "Shooting 1908". Herman's Full Olympians.
