= Harry Adams (sport shooter) =

American sport shooter

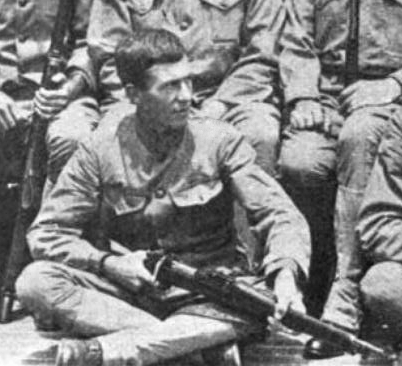
- At the 1912 Summer Olympics

Personal information
- Born: October 1, 1880 West Medway, Massachusetts, United States
- Died: August 12, 1968 (aged 87) Oakland, California, United States

Sport
- Sport: Sports shooting
Medal record
Men's shooting
Representing United States
Olympic Games
Gold medal – first place	1912 Stockholm	Team military rifle

Harry Lester Adams (October 1, 1880 – August 12, 1968) was an American sport shooter who competed in the 1912 Summer Olympics and in the 1920 Summer Olympics. In 1912, he won the gold medal as member of the American team in the team military rifle competition. In the 1912 Summer Olympics he also participated in the following events:

- 600 metre free rifle - twelfth place
- 300 metre military rifle, three positions - twelfth place
- 300 metre free rifle, three positions - 28th place

Eight years later, he participated in the 300 metre military rifle, prone event, but his place is unknown. He was born in Medway, Massachusetts.
