= Auguste Marion =

French sport shooter

Personal information
- Born: 11 July 1876 Paris, France
- Died: 1 July 1955 (aged 78) Paris, France

Sport
- Sport: Sport shooting

Auguste Marion (11 July 1876 – 1 July 1955) was a French sport shooter who competed in the 1912 Summer Olympics. He was born in Paris.

In 1912, he was a member of the French team which finished fourth in the team free rifle event. In the 300 metre military rifle, three positions competition he finished 40th, and in the 600 metre free rifle event he finished 63rd.
