= Werner Jernström =

Swedish sport shooter

Personal information
- Born: 5 January 1883 Stockholm, Sweden
- Died: 29 April 1930 (aged 47) Stockholm, Sweden

Sport
- Sport: Sports shooting
Medal record
Men's shooting
Representing Sweden
Olympic Games
Bronze medal – third place	1912 Stockholm	Team military rifle

Werner Jernström (5 January 1883 – 29 April 1930) was a Swedish sport shooter who competed in the 1912 Summer Olympics and in the 1920 Summer Olympics.

In 1912, he won the bronze medal as a member of the Swedish team in the 50 metre military rifle event.

In the 1912 Summer Olympics, he also participated in the following events:

- 600 metre free rifle – sixth place
- 300 metre free rifle, three positions – twentieth place
- 300 metre military rifle, three positions – 53rd place

Eight years later, he finished fifth with the Swedish team in the team 300 metre military rifle, prone event. He also competed in the 300 metre military rifle, prone contest, but his exact place is unknown.
