= Henry Burr (sport shooter) =

British sport shooter (1872–1946)

Personal information
- Born: 21 March 1872 Charlton, London, England
- Died: 20 December 1946 (aged 74) Beckenham, London, England

Sport
- Sport: Sports shooting
Medal record
Men's shooting
Representing United Kingdom
Olympic Games
Silver medal – second place	1912 Stockholm	Team military rifle

Henry George Burr (21 March 1872 – 20 December 1946) was a British sport shooter who competed in the 1912 Summer Olympics. In 1912 he won the silver medal with the British team in the team military rifle competition. He finished tenth in the 600 metre free rifle event.
