= Olaf Husby =

Norwegian sport shooter (1878–1948)

Personal information
- Born: 17 January 1878 Trondheim, Norway
- Died: 30 June 1948 (aged 70) Trondheim, Norway

Sport
- Sport: Sports shooting

Olaf Husby (17 January 1878 – 30 June 1948) was a Norwegian sport shooter who competed in the 1912 Summer Olympics. In 1912 he finished sixth with the Norwegian team in the team military rifle competition. He also participated in the 300 metre free rifle, three positions event and finished 27th.
