= Tönnes Björkman =

Swedish sport shooter

Personal information
- Born: 25 March 1888 Götaland, Sweden
- Died: 21 November 1959 (aged 71) Stockholm, Sweden

Sport
- Sport: Sports shooting
Medal record
Men's shooting
Representing Sweden
Olympic Games
Bronze medal – third place	1912 Stockholm	Team military rifle

Tönnes Björkman (25 March 1888 – 21 November 1959) was a Swedish sport shooter who competed in the 1912 Summer Olympics.

In 1912, he won the bronze medal as a member of the Swedish team in the team military rifle competition. In the 1912 Summer Olympics he also participated in the following events:

- 300 metre free rifle, three positions – eighth place
- 300 metre military rifle, three positions – 14th place
- 600 metre free rifle – 25th place
