= Cornelius Burdette =

American sport shooter (1878–1955)

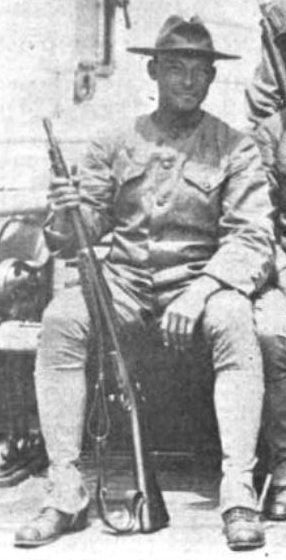
- At the 1912 Summer Olympics

Personal information
- Born: November 6, 1878 Sandstone, West Virginia, United States
- Died: April 30, 1955 (aged 76) Charleston, West Virginia, United States

Sport
- Sport: Sports shooting
Medal record
Men's shooting
Representing United States
Olympic Games
Gold medal – first place	1912 Stockholm	Team military rifle

Cornelius Lonzo Burdette (November 6, 1878 – April 30, 1955) was an American sport shooter who competed in the 1912 Summer Olympics.

He was born in Sandstone, West Virginia and died in Charleston, West Virginia. In 1912, he won the gold medal as a member of the American team in the team military rifle competition. In the 1912 Summer Olympics he also participated in the following events:

- 600 metre free rifle - eighth place
- 300 metre free rifle, three positions - 21st place
- 300 metre military rifle, three positions - 52nd place
