= James Reid (sport shooter) =

British sport shooter (1875–1957)

Personal information
- Born: 8 March 1875 Buckie, Moray, Scotland
- Died: 19 March 1957 (aged 82) Buckie, Moray, Scotland

Sport
- Sport: Sports shooting
Medal record
Men's shooting
Representing United Kingdom
Olympic Games
Silver medal – second place	1912 Stockholm	Team military rifle

James Reid (8 March 1875 – 19 March 1957) was a British sport shooter who competed in the 1912 Summer Olympics. In 1912 he won the silver medal with the British team in the team military rifle competition. In the 600 metre free rifle event he finished 13th.
