= Johannes Espelund =

Norwegian sport shooter (1885–1952)

Personal information
- Born: 20 February 1885 Rakkestad, Norway
- Died: 20 April 1952 (aged 67) Oslo, Norway

Sport
- Sport: Sports shooting

Johannes Espelund (20 February 1885 – 20 April 1952) was a Norwegian sport shooter. He was born in Rakkestad, and his club was Christiania Skytterlag. He competed in the military rifle shooting at the 1912 Summer Olympics in Stockholm.
