= Engebret Skogen =

Norwegian sport shooter (1887–1968)

Embret Skogen
Personal information
- Full name: Engebret Engebretsen Skogen
- Born: 20 August 1887 Løten, Norway
- Died: 4 September 1968 (aged 81) Hamar, Norway

Sport
- Sport: Shooting
- Club: Løiten Skytterlag
Medal record
Men's shooting
Representing Norway
Olympic Games
Bronze medal – third place	1912 Stockholm	Military rifle, three positions

Engebret Engebretsen "Embret" Skogen (20 August 1887 – 4 September 1968) was a Norwegian rifle shooter who competed in the early 20th century. At the 1912 Summer Olympics in Stockholm he won the bronze medal in Military rifle, three positions. He also participated in the 300 metre free rifle, three positions event and finished 31st.

He was a grandfather of Dag Fornæss, a former Olympic speed skater.
