= Edward Parnell (sport shooter) =

British sport shooter

Personal information
- Born: 21 June 1875 Bovey Tracey, Devon, England
- Died: 2 February 1941 (aged 65) Paignton, Torbay, England

Sport
- Sport: Sports shooting
Medal record
Men's shooting
Representing United Kingdom
Olympic Games
Silver medal – second place	1912 Stockholm	Team military rifle

Edward Louis Parnell (21 June 1875 – 2 February 1941) was a British sport shooter who competed in the 1912 Summer Olympics.

== Early life ==
Parnell was born at Bovey Tracey, in the County of Devon, in England.

== Olympian ==
In 1912, he won the silver medal with the British team in the team military rifle competition. In the 600 metre free rifle event he finished 18th, and in the 300 metre military rifle, three positions he finished 56th.

== Military career ==
Pre-1908, Parnell was a commissioned officer in the British Army's 2nd (South) Middlesex Volunteer Reserve Corps, a unit with a high reputation for rifle sports marksmanship in British Army military circles. Post-1908 he served with the 13th County of London Regiment ("The Kensingtons"), Territorial Force.

Parnell was mobilised on 4 August 1914 on the outbreak of World War I and went out to the Western Front as a Captain with the 1st Kensingtons on 4 November 1914.

In October 1917, his only child, Leslie Parnell, was killed during the Battle of Passchendaele as a subaltern with the 2nd Battalion of the 4th East Lancashire Regiment (on attachment from his father's corps) aged 20.

Parnell was demobilised at the war's end in 1918 with the rank of Major.

== Death ==
He died on 2 February 1941 in Totnes, in the county of Devon, at the age of 65. His grave is located at St. Mary's Church, Long Ditton, in the county of Surrey, England.
