= Nils Skog =

Swedish sports shooter

Personal information
- Born: 16 December 1877 Hudiksvall, Sweden
- Died: 28 April 1964 (aged 86) Hudiksvall, Sweden

Sport
- Sport: Sports shooting

Nils Skog (16 December 1877 – 28 April 1964) was a Swedish sports shooter. He competed in the 300m free rifle, three positions event at the 1912 Summer Olympics.
