= Carl Flodström =

Swedish sport shooter

Personal information
- Born: 12 August 1863 Sundborn, Sweden
- Died: 17 November 1930 (aged 67) Gävle, Sweden

Sport
- Sport: Sports shooting

Carl E. Flodström (12 August 1863 – 17 November 1930) was a Swedish sport shooter who competed in the 1912 Summer Olympics. In 1912, he finished eighth in the 300 metre military rifle, three positions competition.
