= Charles Jeffreys =

South African sport shooter

Personal information
- Born: 7 December 1877 Oamaru, New Zealand
- Died: 18 October 1917 (aged 39) Koppies, South Africa

Sport
- Sport: Sports shooting

Charles Alfred Jeffreys (7 December 1877 – 18 October 1917) was a South African sport shooter who competed in the 1912 Summer Olympics.

In the 1912 Summer Olympics he participated in the following events:

- Team military rifle – fourth place
- 300 metre military rifle, three positions – 34th place
- 600 metre free rifle – 42nd place
- 300 metre free rifle, three positions – 70th place
