= Edward Skilton =

British sport shooter (1863–1917)

Personal information
- Born: 26 September 1863 Edmonton, London, England
- Died: 21 June 1917 (aged 53) Watford, Hertfordshire, England

Sport
- Sport: Sports shooting
Medal record
Men's shooting
Representing United Kingdom
Olympic Games
Silver medal – second place	1912 Stockholm	Team military rifle

Edward Skilton (26 September 1863 – 21 June 1917) was a British sport shooter who competed in the 1912 Summer Olympics. In 1912 he won the silver medal with the British team in the team military rifle competition. In the 600 metre free rifle event he finished 16th.
