= Laurits Larsen =

Danish sport shooter (1872–1949)

Personal information
- Born: 8 April 1872
- Died: 28 June 1949 (aged 77)

Sport
- Sport: Sports shooting
Medal record
Men's shooting
Representing Denmark
Olympic Games
Bronze medal – third place	1912 Stockholm	team free rifle

Laurits Theodor Christian Larsen (8 April 1872 in Skelby, Falster, Denmark – 28 June 1949 in Skelby, Falster, Denmark) was a Danish sport shooter who competed in the 1912 Summer Olympics and in the 1920 Summer Olympics.

In 1912, he won the bronze medal as a member of the Danish team in the team free rifle competition. He finished eighth in the team military rifle event. In the 50 metre pistol competition he finished 21st and in the 300 metre free rifle, three positions event he finished 33rd. Eight years later, he finished fourth in the 50 metre free pistol competition.
