= Louis Percy =

French sport shooter

Personal information
- Born: 15 September 1872 Lorquin, France

Sport
- Sport: Sport shooting

Louis Percy (born 15 September 1872, date of death unknown) was a French sport shooter who competed in the 1912 Summer Olympics.

He was born in Lorquin.

In 1912, at the Stockholm Games, he participated in the following events:

- team free rifle – fourth place
- team rifle – fifth place
- 600 metre free rifle – 20th place
- 300 metre military rifle, three positions – 23rd place
- 300 metre free rifle, three positions – 44th place

Percy was a resistance member during World War II.
