= Nils Romander =

Swedish sport shooter

Personal information
- Born: 3 July 1893 Fagerhult, Hylte, Halland, Sweden
- Died: 1 October 1978 (aged 85) Lidingö, Sweden

Sport
- Sport: Sports shooting

Nils Gustaf Daniel Romander (3 July 1893 – 1 October 1978) was a Swedish sport shooter who competed in the 1912 Summer Olympics, finishing fifth in the 300 metre military rifle, three positions competition.
