= August Wikström =

Swedish sports shooter (1874–1954)

Personal information
- Born: 25 November 1874 Luleå, Sweden
- Died: 16 August 1954 (aged 79) Luleå, Sweden

Sport
- Sport: Sports shooting

August Wikström (25 November 1874 – 16 August 1954) was a Swedish sports shooter. He competed in the 300m free rifle, three positions event at the 1912 Summer Olympics.
