= Niels Andersen (sport shooter) =

Danish sport shooter and Olympian (1867–1930)

Personal information
- Born: 14 May 1867 Skibinge, Denmark
- Died: 9 October 1930 (aged 63) Hyllinge, Denmark

Sport
- Sport: Sports shooting
Medal record
Men's shooting
Representing Denmark
Olympic Games
Bronze medal – third place	1912 Stockholm	Team free rifle

Niels Andersen (14 May 1867 – 9 October 1930) was a Danish sport shooter who competed at the 1908 Summer Olympics and the 1912 Summer Olympics.

In 1908, he finished fourth with the Danish team in the team free rifle competition and eighth in the team military rifle event. Four years later, he won the bronze medal as a member of the Danish team in the team free rifle competition. In the team military rifle event he finished eighth.
