= Paul Colas =

French sport shooter (1880–1956)

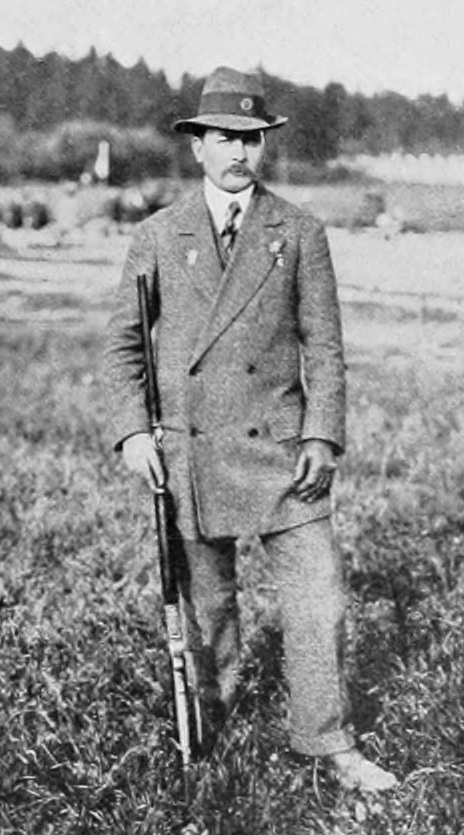
- Colas in 1912
Medal record
Men's shooting
Representing France
Olympic Games
Gold medal – first place	1912 Stockholm	300 m free rifle, three positions
Gold medal – first place	1912 Stockholm	600 m free rifle
Silver medal – second place	1924 Paris	Team free rifle
Bronze medal – third place	1908 London	Team small-bore rifle

Paul René Colas (6 May 1880 – 9 September 1956) was a French sport shooter who competed at the 1908, 1912, 1920, and 1924 Summer Olympics.

Between 1908 and 1924, Colas won four Olympic medals: a bronze in 1908, two gold in 1912, and one silver in 1924. Only in 1920 did he fail to win a medal. With his two individual gold medals at the 1912 Games, he became the second shooter (a day behind Alfred Lane of the United States) and the first rifle shooter to win two individual Olympic gold medals.

In the 1908 Olympics, he also participated in the following events:

- 300 metre free rifle - 25th place
- 1000 yard free rifle - 28th place

In the 1912 Olympics, he also participated in the following events:

- Team free rifle - fourth place
- Team military rifle - fifth place
- 300 metre military rifle, three positions - 22nd place

In the 1920 Olympics, he also participated in the following events:

- Team free rifle - seventh place
- 300 m free rifle, 3 positions - result unknown
