= Gustaf Adolf Jonsson =

Swedish sport shooter

Personal information
- Nationality: Swedish
- Born: 26 June 1879 Stockholm, Sweden
- Died: 30 April 1949 (aged 69) Stockholm, Sweden

Sport
- Country: Sweden
- Sport: Sports shooting
Medal record
Men's shooting
Representing Sweden
Olympic Games
Gold medal – first place	1912 Stockholm	Team free rifle
Silver medal – second place	1908 London	Team free rifle
Bronze medal – third place	1920 Antwerp	Team 600 metre

Gustaf Adolf Jonsson (26 June 1879 – 30 April 1949) was a Swedish sport shooter who competed at the 1908, the 1912 and the 1920 Summer Olympics.

In 1908, he won the silver medal in the team free rifle event.

In the team military rifle event he finished fifth, and in the 300 metre free rifle competition he finished 15th.

Four years later, he won the gold medal as a member of the Swedish free rifle.

In the 300 metre free rifle, three positions event he finished eleventh, and in the 300 metre military rifle, three positions competition he finished 16th.

In 1920, he won the bronze medal as part of the Swedish 600 metre military rifle prone team.

In the 300 and 600 metre team military rifle, prone event he finished sixth. He also participated in the 300 metre military rifle, prone competition and in the 600 metre military rifle, prone event but his exact place is unknown.
