= Léon Johnson =

French sport shooter (1876–1943)

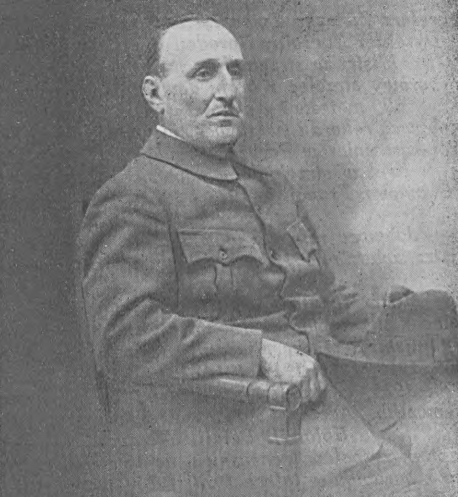

Personal information
- Born: 29 February 1876 Nice, France
- Died: 2 January 1943 (aged 66) Paris, France

Sport
- Sport: Sports shooting
Medal record
Men's shooting
Representing France
Olympic Games
Silver medal – second place	1920 Antwerp	300m military rifle
Silver medal – second place	1920 Antwerp	team 300m
Bronze medal – third place	1908 London	team free rifle

Léon Johnson (29 February 1876 – 2 January 1943) was a French sport shooter who competed at the 1908 Summer Olympics, the 1912 Summer Olympics and at the 1920 Summer Olympics.

1908 London

In 1908, he was a member of the French team, winning the bronze medal in the team free rifle competition.

In the 1908 Summer Olympics, he also participated in the following events:

- 300 metre free rifle – eighth place
- moving target small-bore rifle – tenth place
- disappearing target small-bore rifle – 21st place

1912 Stockholm

Four years later, he participated in the following events:

- Team 50 metre small-bore rifle – fourth place
- Team free rifle – fourth place
- Team military rifle – fifth place
- 50 metre pistol – tenth place
- 25 metre small-bore rifle – 19th place
- 300 metre free rifle, three positions – 24th place

1920 Antwerp

In 1920, he won silver medals in the 300 metre military rifle, prone event, and as a member of the French team in the team, 300 metre military rifle, prone competition.

In the 1920 Summer Olympics, he also participated in the following events:

- Team 300 and 600 metre military rifle, prone – fourth place
- Team 30 metre military pistol – fifth place
- Team 50 metre small-bore rifle – fifth place
- Team 300 metre military rifle, standing – fifth place
- Team 600 metre military rifle, prone – fifth place
- Team 50 metre free pistol – sixth place
- 50 metre small-bore rifle – result unknown
- 300 metre military rifle, standing – result unknown
