= Herman Skjerven =

Norwegian sport shooter (1872–1952)

Personal information
- Born: 27 October 1872 Hafslo, Norway
- Died: 14 March 1952 (aged 79) Oslo, Norway

Sport
- Sport: Sports shooting

Herman Skjerven (27 October 1872 – 14 March 1952) was a Norwegian sport shooter. He was born in Hafslo Municipality (part of the present-day Luster Municipality), and his club was Oslo Østre Skytterlag. He competed in the military rifle at the 1912 Summer Olympics in Stockholm.
