= Ole Jensen (Norwegian sport shooter) =

Norwegian sport shooter (1872–1943)

Personal information
- Born: 1 December 1872 Kinn, Norway
- Died: 6 March 1943 (aged 70) Høybråten, Norway

Sport
- Sport: Sports shooting

Ole Jensen (1 December 1872 – 6 March 1943) was a Norwegian sport shooter. He was born in Kinn Municipality. He competed in team rifle at the 1912 Summer Olympics in Stockholm, where Norwegian team placed sixth.
