= Emil Holm (sport shooter) =

Finnish sport shooter

Personal information
- Born: 2 September 1877 Larsmo, Finland
- Died: 12 April 1925 (aged 47) Galveston, United States

Sport
- Sport: Sports shooting

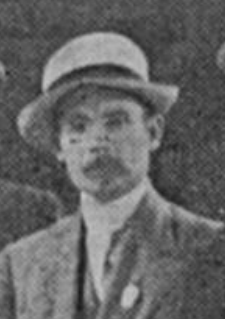
EmilHolm

Emil Holm (2 September 1877 – 12 April 1925) was a Finnish sport shooter who competed in the 1912 Summer Olympics. He was born in Larsmo.

In 1912, he was a member of the Finnish team which finished fifth in the team free rifle competition. In the 300 metre free rifle, three positions, he finished 49th.
