= Ole Olsen (sport shooter) =

Danish sport shooter (1869–1944)

Personal information
- Born: 7 June 1869 Lynge, Denmark
- Died: 7 September 1944 (aged 75) Copenhagen, Denmark

Sport
- Sport: Sports shooting
Medal record
Men's shooting
Representing Denmark
Olympic Games
Bronze medal – third place	1912 Stockholm	Team free rifle

Ole Olsen (7 June 1869 – 7 September 1944) was a Danish sport shooter who competed at the 1908 and 1912 Summer Olympics.

In 1908, he finished fourth with the Danish team in the team free rifle competition and eighth in the team military rifle event. Four years later, he won the bronze medal as a member of the Danish team in the team free rifle competition. In the 300 m free rifle, three positions event, he finished twelfth.
