= Jens Hajslund =

Danish sport shooter (1877–1964)

Personal information
- Born: 29 May 1877 Hjelm, Midtjylland, Denmark
- Died: 28 August 1964 (aged 87) Struer, Midtjylland, Denmark

Sport
- Sport: Sports shooting
Medal record
Men's shooting
Representing Denmark
Olympic Games
| Bronze medal – third place | 1912 Stockholm | team free rifle |

Jens Madsen Hajslund (29 May 1877 – 28 August 1964) was a Danish sport shooter who competed in the 1912 Summer Olympics.

In 1912, he won the bronze medal as a member of the Danish team in the team free rifle competition. In the team military rifle event he finished eighth. He also participated in the 300 metre free rifle, three positions but did not finish the contest.
