= George Barnes (sport shooter) =

British sport shooter

Personal information
- Born: c. 1849
- Died: 25 January 1934 (aged 84–85)

Sport
- Sport: Sports shooting
Medal record
Men's shooting
Representing United Kingdom
Olympic Games
Bronze medal – third place	1908 London	Stationary target

George Barnes (c. 1849 – 25 January 1934) was a British sport shooter who competed at the 1908 Summer Olympics.

Earlier in life he had served in the British Army with the 1st battalion of the Middlesex Regiment.

In the 1908 Olympics, he won a bronze medal in the stationary target small-bore rifle event.

== See also ==
- Summer Olympics
- Target shooting
