= Ole Degnæs =

Norwegian sport shooter (1877–1943)

Personal information
- Born: 29 June 1877 Årjäng, Norway
- Died: 27 May 1943 (aged 65) Chicago, Illinois, United States

Sport
- Sport: Sports shooting

Ole Degnæs (29 June 1877 – 27 May 1943) was a Norwegian sport shooter. He was born in Årjäng in Värmland, Sweden. Degnæs competed in team rifle at the 1912 Summer Olympics in Stockholm, where Norwegian team placed sixth.
