= Carl Björkman (sport shooter) =

Swedish sport shooter

Personal information
- Nationality: Swedish
- Born: 31 December 1869 Götaland, Sweden
- Died: 4 February 1960 (aged 90) Stockholm, Sweden

Sport
- Country: Sweden
- Sport: Sports shooting
Medal record
Men's shooting
Representing Sweden
Olympic Games
Gold medal – first place	1912 Stockholm	Team free rifle
Bronze medal – third place	1912 Stockholm	Team military rifle

Carl Björkman (31 December 1869 – 4 February 1960) was a Swedish sport shooter who competed in the 1912 Summer Olympics.

In 1912, he won the gold medal as a member of the Swedish team in the team free rifle event and the bronze medal in the team military rifle competition. He also participated in the free rifle, three positions event and finished 34th.
