= Bernhard Larsson =

Swedish sport shooter

Personal information
- Nationality: Swedish
- Born: 14 August 1879 Örebro, Sweden
- Died: 1 August 1947 (aged 67) Stockholm, Sweden

Sport
- Country: Sweden
- Sport: Sports shooting
Medal record
Men's shooting
Representing Sweden
Olympic Games
Gold medal – first place	1912 Stockholm	Team free rifle
Bronze medal – third place	1912 Stockholm	Team military rifle

Bernhard Larsson (14 August 1879 – 1 August 1947) was a Swedish sport shooter who competed in the 1912 Summer Olympics.

In 1912, he won the gold medal as a member of the Swedish team in the team free rifle competition and the bronze medal in the team military rifle event. He also participated in the 300 metre free rifle, three positions and finished in sixth place.
