= John Herschel Hardcastle =

Artillery officer

Major John Herschel Hardcastle (1870–1937) was an artillery officer in the British Army.

He became a ballistics expert and conducted experiments at the Royal Arsenal to devise data and formulae which were used for the army's official ballistic tables. He was himself a good shot and represented England in the Elcho Shield contest.

His middle name comes from his mother, who was the daughter of the astronomer and polymath, Sir John Herschel.

Hardcastle had several patents on projectiles and devices for sighting (observation) from aircraft.
