= Arthur Carnell =

British sport shooter (1862–1940)

Personal information
- Born: 21 March 1862 Somers Town, London, England
- Died: 11 September 1940 (aged 78) Bedford Park, London, England

Sport
- Sport: Sports shooting
Medal record
Men's shooting
Representing United Kingdom
Olympic Games
Gold medal – first place	1908 London	Stationary target

Arthur Ashton Carnell (21 March 1862 – 11 September 1940) was a British sport shooter who competed at the 1908 Summer Olympics.

In the 1908 Olympics, he won a gold medal in the stationary target small-bore rifle event.
