= Niels Larsen =

Danish sport shooter (1889–1969)

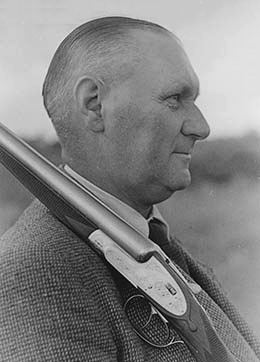
- Larsen with a shotgun produced by his company in 1945

Personal information
- Born: 21 November 1889 Horsens, Denmark
- Died: 15 November 1969 (aged 79) Syddanmark, Denmark

Sport
- Sport: Sports shooting
- Event(s): Rifle, pistol
- Club: Otterup
Medal record
Representing Denmark
Olympic Games
Bronze medal – third place	1912 Stockholm	300 m free rifle, three positions
Bronze medal – third place	1912 Stockholm	Team free rifle
Gold medal – first place	1920 Antwerp	Team 300 m military rifle, standing
Silver medal – second place	1920 Antwerp	300 m free rifle, three positions
Bronze medal – third place	1924 Paris	600 metre free rifle

Niels Hansen Ditlev Larsen (21 November 1889 – 15 November 1969) was a Danish sport shooter and rifle manufacturer. He competed in various rifle and pistol events in the 1912, 1920 and 1924 Summer Olympics and won one gold, one silver and three bronze medals, becoming the most successful Danish Olympic shooter.

== Biography ==
Larsen took up shooting early, and was training in a city club by the age of 14. His talent was noticed by Hans Schultz, an Olympic shooter who owned a guns workshop in Otterup. Schultz hired Larsen in 1910; in 1912 they competed together in the Stockholm Olympics, in 1917 became business partners, and in 1919 expanded the Schultz's workshop into the Schultz & Larsen factory. Earlier in 1916 Larsen married Schultz's daughter Ellen. Their son Uffe Schultz Larsen also became an Olympic shooter and worked for Schultz & Larsen.

== Olympic results ==
1912 Stockholm

In 1912 Larsen won the bronze medal in the 300 metre free rifle, three positions event and also with the Danish team in the team free rifle competition. He also participated in the following events:

- Team military rifle – eighth place
- 50 metre pistol – 41st place
- 300 metre military rifle, three positions – 63rd place

1920 Antwerp

Eight years later Larsen won the gold medal as member of the Danish team in the team 300 metre military rifle, standing event and the silver medal in the 300 metre free rifle, three positions competition. He also participated in the following events:

- 50 metre free pistol – fifth place
- Team free rifle – fifth place
- Team 50 metre free pistol – eighth place
- Team 300 metre military rifle, prone – 13th place
- 300 metre military rifle, standing – place unknown
- 300 metre military rifle, prone – result unknown
- 600 metre military rifle, prone – result unknown

1924 Paris

In 1924 Larsen won the bronze medal in the 600 metre free rifle competition and finished sixth with the Danish team in the team free rifle event.
