= Carl Veidahl =

Norwegian sport shooter (1879–1974)

Personal information
- Born: 6 March 1879 Våler, Østfold, Norway
- Died: 27 July 1974 (aged 95) Oslo, Norway

Sport
- Sport: Sports shooting

Carl Veidahl (6 March 1879 – 27 July 1974) was a Norwegian sport shooter. He was born in Våler in Østfold, and his club was Oslo Østre Skytterlag. He competed in military rifle at the 1912 Summer Olympics in Stockholm.
