= Torsten Nyström =

Swedish sports shooter

Personal information
- Born: 11 July 1878 Gothenburg, Sweden
- Died: 13 September 1953 (aged 75) Göteborg, Sweden

Sport
- Sport: Sports shooting

Torsten Nyström (11 July 1878 – 13 September 1953) was a Swedish sports shooter. He competed in two events at the 1912 Summer Olympics.
