= John Jackson (sport shooter) =

American sport shooter

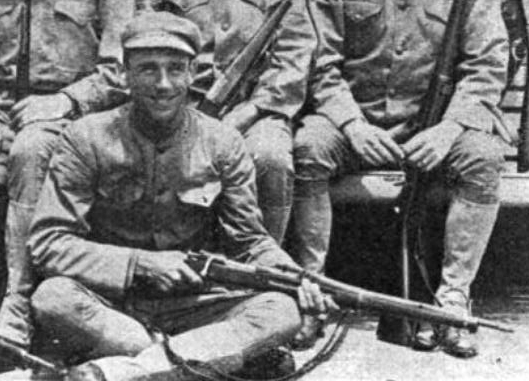
- At the 1912 Summer Olympics

Personal information
- Born: February 14, 1885 Lincoln, Nebraska, United States
- Died: June 17, 1971 (aged 86) Fairfield, Iowa, United States

Sport
- Sport: Sports shooting
Medal record
Men's shooting
Representing United States
Olympic Games
Gold medal – first place	1912 Stockholm	Team military rifle
Bronze medal – third place	1912 Stockholm	600 m free rifle

John E. Jackson (February 14, 1885 – June 17, 1971) was an American sport shooter who competed in the 1912 Summer Olympics. Representing the United States, he won the gold medal in the team military rifle competition and the bronze medal in the 600 metre free rifle event. In the 300 metre military rifle, three positions he finished 33rd.

He was born in Lincoln, Nebraska and died in Fairfield, Iowa.
