= Einar Liberg =

Norwegian sport shooter (1873–1955)

Personal information
- Born: 16 October 1873 Heradsbygd, Norway
- Died: 9 September 1955 (aged 81) Oslo, Norway

Sport
- Sport: Sports shooting
Medal record
Men's shooting
Representing Norway
Olympic Games
Gold medal – first place	1908 London	Team Free Rifle
Gold medal – first place	1920 Antwerp	Team running deer, single shots
Gold medal – first place	1920 Antwerp	Team running deer, double shots
Gold medal – first place	1924 Paris	Team running deer, single shots
Silver medal – second place	1912 Stockholm	Team free rifle
Silver medal – second place	1924 Paris	Team running deer, double shots
Bronze medal – third place	1920 Antwerp	Running deer, double shots

Einar Liberg (16 October 1873 – 9 September 1955) was a Norwegian rifle shooter who competed in the early 20th century. He won the gold medal with the Norwegian 300 metre free rifle team at the 1908 Summer Olympics in London, and four years later at the 1912 Summer Olympics in Stockholm he won the silver medal with the free rifle team. At the 1920 Summer Olympics in Antwerp, he competed in running deer and won two gold medals in team, running deer, single shot, and team, running deer, double shot. He also took the individual bronze medal in running deer, double shot. In the 1924 Summer Olympics in Paris, he ended his long Olympic career by taking another gold medal in team, running deer, single shot, and a silver medal in team, running deer, double shot.
