= Karl Wallenborg =

Swedish sports shooter (1875–1962)

Personal information
- Born: 12 May 1875 Tystberga, Sweden
- Died: 16 January 1962 (aged 86) Stockholm, Sweden

Sport
- Sport: Sports shooting

Karl Wallenborg (12 May 1875 – 16 January 1962) was a Swedish sports shooter. He competed in two events at the 1912 Summer Olympics.
