= Olaf Sæther =

Norwegian sport shooter (1872–1945)

Personal information
- Born: 7 January 1872 Hedmark, Norway
- Died: 1 November 1945 (aged 73) Oslo, Norway

Sport
- Sport: Sports shooting
Medal record
Men's shooting
Representing Norway
Olympic Games
Gold medal – first place	1908 London	Team free rifle
Silver medal – second place	1912 Stockholm	Team free rifle

Olaf Sæther (7 January 1872 – 1 November 1945) was a Norwegian rifle shooter who competed in the early 20th century. He won the gold medal with the Norwegian 300 metre free rifle team at the 1908 Summer Olympics in London, and four years later at the 1912 Summer Olympics in Stockholm he won the silver medal with the free rifle team.
