= Gudbrand Skatteboe =

Norwegian sport shooter (1875–1965)

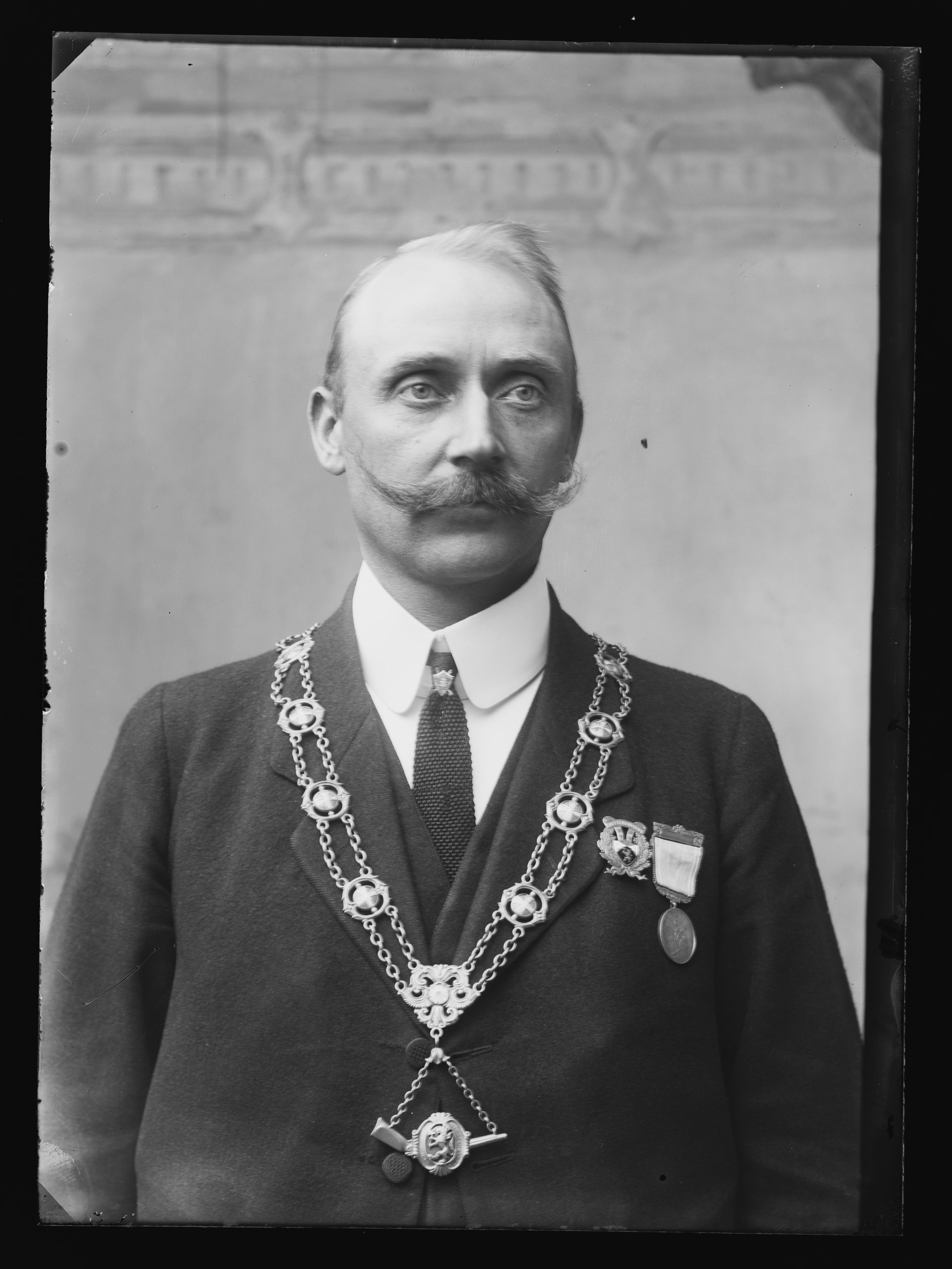

Personal information
- Born: 18 July 1875 Øystre Slidre Municipality, Norway
- Died: 3 April 1965 (aged 89) Øystre Slidre, Norway

Sport
- Sport: Sports shooting
Medal record
Men's shooting
Representing Norway
Olympic Games
| Gold medal – first place | 1908 London | Team free rifle |
| Silver medal – second place | 1912 Stockholm | Team free rifle |
| Silver medal – second place | 1920 Antwerp | Team free rifle |
Intercalated Games
| Gold medal – first place | 1906 Athens | Free rifle, 3 positions |
| Gold medal – first place | 1906 Athens | Free rifle, prone |
| Gold medal – first place | 1906 Athens | Free rifle, standing |
| Silver medal – second place | 1906 Athens | Team free rifle |

Gudbrand Guldbrandsen Skatteboe (18 July 1875 – 3 April 1965) was a Norwegian rifle shooter who competed in the early 20th century in rifle shooting. He won the gold medal with the Norwegian 300 metre free rifle team at the 1908 Summer Olympics in London, also winning silver medals with the team at the 1912 and 1920 Summer Olympics. He also competed at the 1906 Intercalated Games, winning a silver medal.
