= Ernest Keeley =

South African sports shooter

Personal information
- Born: 26 May 1890 Pretoria, South African Republic
- Died: 23 July 1918 (aged 28) Flanders, Belgium

Sport
- Sport: Sports shooting

Ernest James Keeley (26 May 1890 – 23 July 1918) was a South African sports shooter. He competed in four events at the 1912 Summer Olympics.

He was killed in action in Belgium during World War I while serving as a Second Lieutenant in the 4th Regiment of South African Infantry, and, having no known grave, is commemorated on the Commonwealth Ploegsteert Memorial.

== See also ==
- List of Olympians killed in World War I
