= Albert Helgerud =

Norwegian rifle shooter (1876–1954)

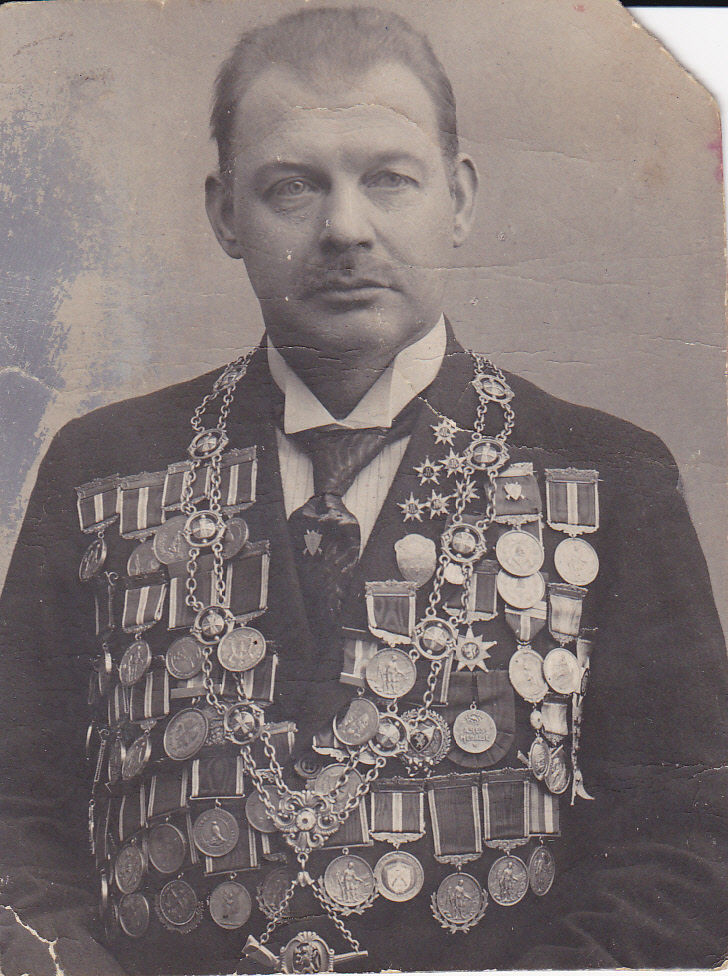

Personal information
- Born: 16 September 1876 Svelvik, Norway
- Died: 25 May 1954 (aged 77) Svelvik, Norway

Sport
- Sport: Sports shooting
Medal record
Men's shooting
Representing Norway
Olympic Games
Gold medal – first place	1908 London	Team free rifle
Gold medal – first place	1908 London	300 m free rifle
Silver medal – second place	1912 Stockholm	Team free rifle
Silver medal – second place	1920 Antwerp	Team free rifle
Silver medal – second place	1920 Antwerp	Team 300 + 600 m military rifle, prone
Bronze medal – third place	1920 Antwerp	Team small-bore rifle
1906 Intercalated Games
Silver medal – second place	1906 Athens	Team free rifle
Bronze medal – third place	1906 Athens	Free rifle, standing

Albert Helgerud (16 September 1876 – 25 May 1954) was a Norwegian rifle shooter who competed in the early 20th century. He won six Olympic medals including two golds.
