= George Whelan (sport shooter) =

South African sports shooter

Personal information
- Born: 6 May 1859 Kandy, Ceylon
- Died: 12 November 1938 (aged 79) Durban, South Africa

Sport
- Sport: Sports shooting

George Whelan (6 May 1859 – 12 November 1938) was a South African sports shooter. He competed in three events at the 1912 Summer Olympics.
