= László Hauler =

Hungarian sports shooter

Personal information
- Born: 26 June 1884 Királydaróc, Austria-Hungary
- Died: 12 September 1914 (aged 30)

Sport
- Sport: Sports shooting

László Hauler (26 June 1884 – 12 September 1914) was a Hungarian sports shooter. He competed in five events at the 1912 Summer Olympics.

Hauler served as a senior lieutenant in the Austro-Hungarian Army. In addition to sport shooting, he was also a gymnast, fencer, swimmer, cyclist, skater, and equestrian.
