= Géza Mészöly (sport shooter) =

Hungarian sports shooter

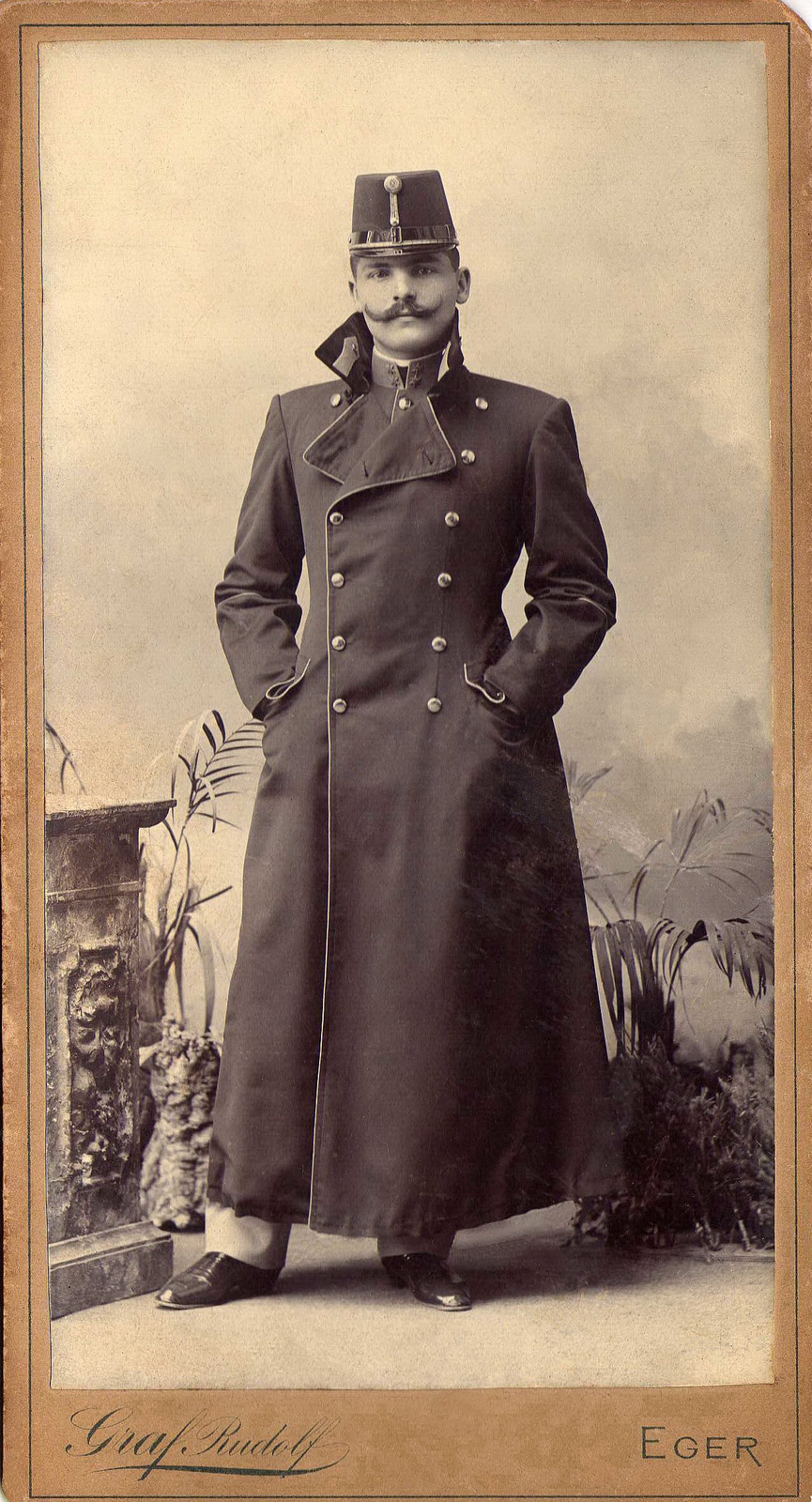

Personal information
- Born: 18 September 1876 Enying, Austria-Hungary
- Died: 4 May 1919 (aged 42) Budapest, Hungary

Sport
- Sport: Sports shooting

Géza Mészöly (18 September 1876 – 4 May 1919) was a Hungarian sports shooter. He competed in four events at the 1912 Summer Olympics. He was killed during the Hungarian Revolution of 1919.
