= Pavel Valden =

Russian sports shooter

Personal information
- Born: 3 August 1887 Simbirsk, Russian Empire
- Died: 28 September 1948 (aged 61) Moscow, Soviet Union

Sport
- Sport: Sports shooting

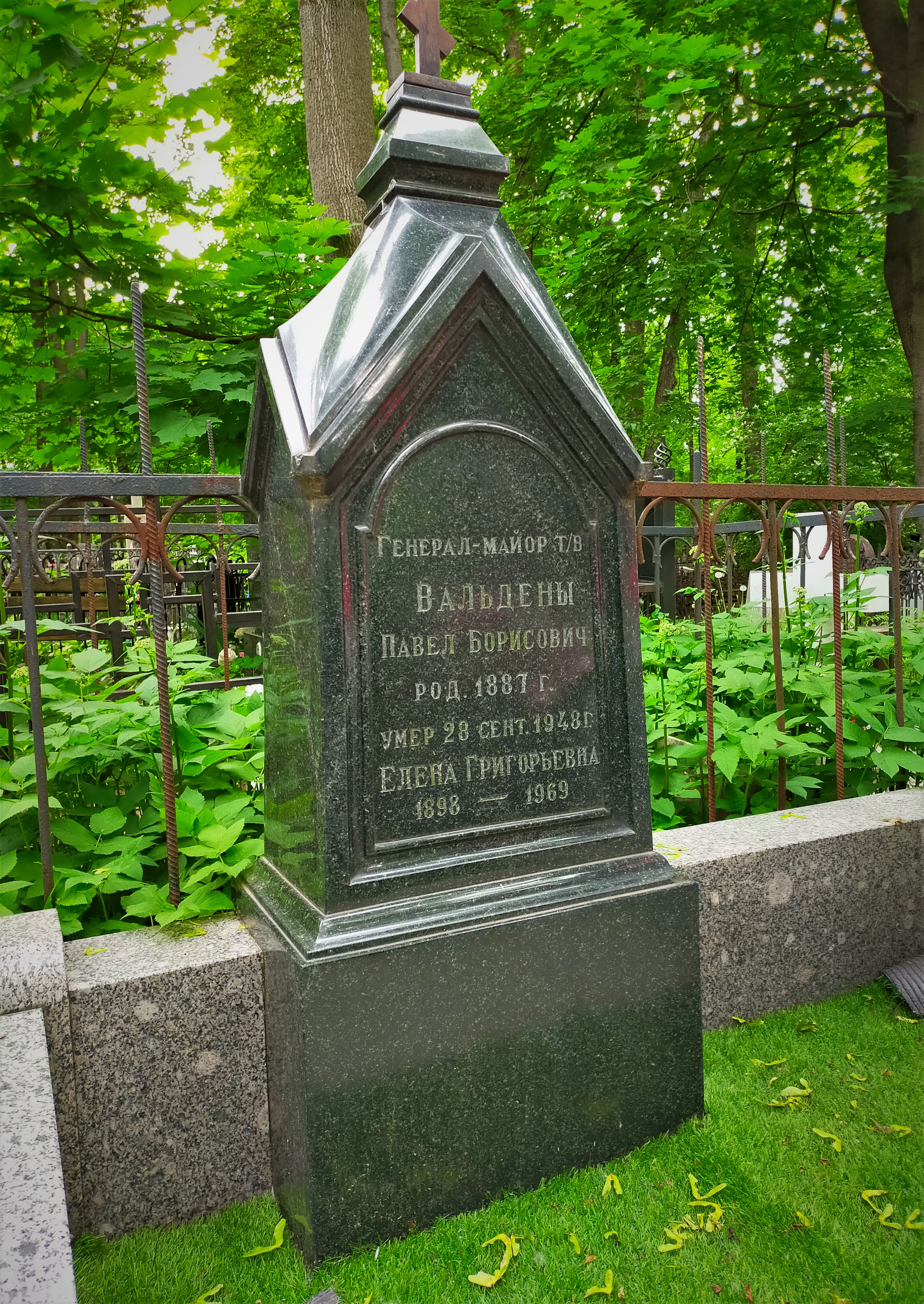
The headstone of Pavel Walden

Pavel Valden (Russian: Павел Борисович Вальден) (3 August 1887 – 28 September 1948) was a Russian Empire sports shooter. He competed in five events at the 1912 Summer Olympics. Major General of Tank Forces of the USSR (1944).
