= Feofan Lebedev =

Estonian sports shooter

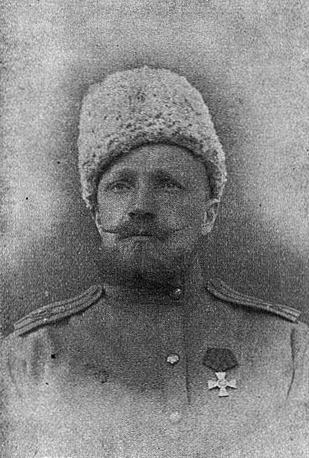

Personal information
- Born: 15 November 1871 Narva, Russian Empire
- Died: 1 November 1966 (aged 94) Uusimaa, Finland

Sport
- Sport: Sports shooting

Feofan Lebedev (15 November 1871 – 1 November 1966) was an Estonian sports shooter. He competed in five events at the 1912 Summer Olympics, representing the Russian Empire.
