= Fencing at the 1912 Summer Olympics – Men's épée =

Olympic fencing event

Men's épée at the Games of the V Olympiad
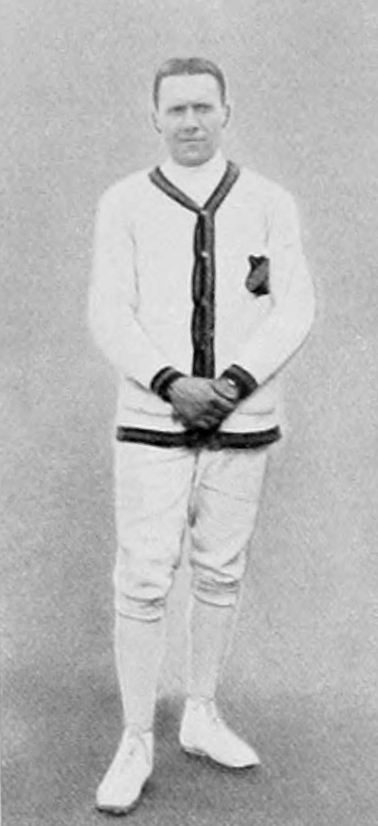
- Gold medalist Paul Anspach
- Venue: Östermalm Athletic Grounds
- Dates: July 11–13, 1912
- Competitors: 93 from 15 nations

Medalists
1st place, gold medalist(s)		Paul Anspach; Belgium
2nd place, silver medalist(s)		Ivan Joseph Martin Osiier; Denmark
3rd place, bronze medalist(s)		Philippe le Hardy; Belgium

The men's épée was a fencing event held as part of the Fencing at the 1912 Summer Olympics programme in Stockholm, Sweden. It was the fourth appearance of the event, which had been introduced in 1900. The competition was held from 11 to 13 July at the Östermalm Athletic Grounds. There were 93 competitors from 15 nations. Each nation could enter up to 12 fencers. The event was won by Paul Anspach of Belgium. His countryman Philippe le Hardy took bronze. Silver went to Denmark's Ivan Joseph Martin Osiier, the only medal won by the perennial Olympian who competed in seven Games over 40 years. The medals were the first in the men's épée for both nations.

== Background ==
This was the fourth appearance of the event, which was not held at the first Games in 1896 (with only foil and sabre events held) but has been held at every Summer Olympics since 1900.

Three of the eight finalists from the 1908 Games returned: fourth-place finisher Robert Montgomerie of Great Britain, fifth-place finisher Paul Anspach of Belgium, and eighth-place finisher Martin Holt of Great Britain. 1904 bronze medalist Albertson Van Zo Post (this time correctly recognized as American rather than Cuban) also returned. The event was heavily impacted by boycotts by two of the top fencing nations over rules disputes. A dispute over the target area for foil fencing resulted in France initially boycotting the foil events and, at the last minute, expanding the boycott to all fencing events. A dispute over the maximum length of the épée blade resulted in Italy boycotting the épée events (though Italy did compete in other fencing events). These disputes would result in the creation of the Fédération Internationale d'Escrime to establish a governing body for the sport.

Austria, Greece, Portugal, and the Russian Empire each made their debut in the event. Belgium, Germany, Great Britain, and the United States each appeared for the third time, tied for most among nations.

== Competition format ==
The competition was held over four rounds. In each round, each pool held a round-robin, with bouts to 1 touch. Double-touches counted as touches against both fencers. Rather than hold separate barrages to separate fencers tied in the advancement spot (as had been done in 1908), the head-to-head results of bouts already fenced were used.

- First round: 16 pools of between 3 and 8 fencers each. The 3 fencers in each pool with the fewest touches against advanced to the quarterfinals. This resulted in some pools where all fencers received a bye.
- Second round: 8 pools of 6 fencers each. The 3 fencers in each pool with the fewest touches against advanced to the semifinals.
- Semifinals: 4 pools of 6 fencers each. The 2 fencers in each pool with the fewest touches against advanced to the final.
- Final: 1 pool of 8 fencers.

== Schedule ==
Date	Time	Round
Thursday, 11 July 1912	9:00; 12:00; 15:00	Round 1 pools A–D; Round 1 pools E–H; Round 1 pools I–L
Friday, 12 July 1912	9:00; 12:00; 15:00	Round 1 pools M–P; Quarterfinals pools A–D; Quarterfinals pools E–H
Saturday, 13 July 1912	9:00; 14:00	Semifinals; Final

== Results ==
=== Round 1 ===
==== Pool A ====
Rank	Fencer	Nation	Losses	Notes
1	Henrik de Iongh	Netherlands	1	Q
1	Einar Levison	Denmark	1	Q
3	Sotirios Notaris	Greece	2	Q
4	Victor Willems	Belgium	3	
5	Julius Lichtenfels	Germany	4	
6	Åke Grönhagen	Sweden	5	
7	Gordon Alexander	Great Britain	6	
7	Pavel Guvorsky	Russian Empire	6	

==== Pool B ====
Rank	Fencer	Nation	Losses	Notes
1	Paul Anspach	Belgium	1	Q
1	Petros Manos	Greece	1	Q
3	Jens Berthelsen	Denmark	3	Q
4	Friedrich Schwarz	Germany	3	
5	Knut Enell	Sweden	4	
5	Aleksandr Soldatenkov	Russian Empire	4	
	A M Hassanein	Egypt	DNS	

==== Pool C ====
Rank	Fencer	Nation	Losses	Notes
1	Konstantinos Kotzias	Greece	1	Q
2	Léon Tom	Belgium	2	Q
3	Arthur Griez	Austria	4	Q
4	Hans Bergsland	Norway	4	
4	Vladimir Kayser	Russian Empire	4	
—	Fernando Correia	Portugal	DSQ	
—	Viliam Tvrzský	Bohemia	DSQ	

==== Pool D ====
Rank	Fencer	Nation	Losses	Notes
1	Vilém Goppold, Jr.	Bohemia	1	Q
1	Einar Sörensen	Sweden	1	Q
3	Severin Finne	Norway	2	Q
4	Sherman Hall	United States	4	
4	George van Rossem	Netherlands	4	
4	Vladimir Sarnavsky	Russian Empire	4	

==== Pool E ====
Rank	Fencer	Nation	Losses	Notes
1	Zdeněk Vávra	Bohemia	1	Q
2	Gavriil Bertrain	Russian Empire	1	Q
3	George Breed	United States	1	Q
4	Christopher von Tangen	Norway	3	

==== Pool F ====
Rank	Fencer	Nation	Losses	Notes
1	Jacques Ochs	Belgium	1	Q
1	Edgar Seligman	Great Britain	1	Q
3	Miloš Klika	Bohemia	3	Q
4	Bjarne Eriksen	Norway	3	
5	Lev Martyushev	Russian Empire	4	

==== Pool G ====
Rank	Fencer	Nation	Losses	Notes
1	Lars Aas	Norway	2	Q
2	Philippe le Hardy	Belgium	3	Q
2	Martin Holt	Great Britain	3	Q
4	Alfred Sauer	United States	3	
5	Josef Javůrek	Bohemia	4	
5	Albertus Perk	Netherlands	4	
7	Walter Gates	South Africa	5	

==== Pool H ====
Rank	Fencer	Nation	Losses	Notes
1	Robert Montgomerie	Great Britain	1	Q
2	František Kříž	Bohemia	2	Q
2	Fernand de Montigny	Belgium	2	Q
4	Marc Larimer	United States	3	
4	Harald Platou	Norway	3	
6	Heinrich Schrader	Germany	5	

==== Pool I ====
Rank	Fencer	Nation	Losses	Notes
1	Victor Boin	Belgium	0	Q
2	Arthur Everitt	Great Britain	1	Q
3	Sigurd Mathiesen	Norway	2	Q
4	Graeme Hammond	United States	3	
5	Jacob van Geuns	Netherlands	4	

==== Pool J ====
Rank	Fencer	Nation	Losses	Notes
1	Hans Thomson	Germany	2	Q
2	Jan de Beaufort	Netherlands	2	Q
3	Louis Sparre	Sweden	2	Q
4	Gaston Salmon	Belgium	3	
5	Percival Davson	Great Britain	4	
5	Josef Pfeiffer	Bohemia	4	
7	John MacLaughlin	United States	5	

==== Pool K ====
Rank	Fencer	Nation	Losses	Notes
1	Edgar Amphlett	Great Britain	—	Q
1	Henri Anspach	Belgium	—	Q
1	Frederic Schenck	United States	—	Q

==== Pool L ====
Rank	Fencer	Nation	Losses	Notes
1	Ivan Osiier	Denmark	0	Q
2	Zdeněk Bárta	Bohemia	1	Q
3	William Bowman	United States	2	Q
4	Ernest Stenson-Cooke	Great Britain	3	

==== Pool M ====
Rank	Fencer	Nation	Losses	Notes
1	Gustaf Lindblom	Sweden	3	Q
2	Adrianus de Jong	Netherlands	3	Q
3	Georgios Versis	Greece	3	Q
4	Sydney Martineau	Great Britain	3	
4	Hermann Plaskuda	Germany	3	
6	Marcel Berré	Belgium	4	
7	John Gignoux	United States	5	
8	Hans Olsen	Denmark	6	

==== Pool N ====
Rank	Fencer	Nation	Losses	Notes
1	Albertson van zo Post	United States	—	Q
1	Pál Rosty	Hungary	—	Q
1	Charles Vanderbyl	Great Britain	—	Q

==== Pool O ====
Rank	Fencer	Nation	Losses	Notes
1	Georg Branting	Sweden	1	Q
2	Emil Schön	Germany	2	Q
2	Trifon Triantafyllakos	Greece	2	Q
4	Willem van Blijenburgh	Netherlands	3	
5	Oluf Berntsen	Denmark	4	
5	John Blake	Great Britain	4	
7	Béla Békessy	Hungary	5	
7	James Moore	United States	5	

==== Pool P ====
Rank	Fencer	Nation	Losses	Notes
1	Georgios Petropoulos	Greece	1	Q
2	Gerald Ames	Great Britain	2	Q
3	Karel Goppold	Bohemia	2	Q
4	Lauritz Østrup	Denmark	3	
5	Walther Meienreis	Germany	4	
6	Willem Molijn	Netherlands	5	

=== Quarterfinals ===
==== Quarterfinal A ====
Rank	Fencer	Nation	Losses	Notes
1	Ivan Osiier	Denmark	1	Q
1	Zdeněk Vávra	Bohemia	1	Q
3	Edgar Seligman	Great Britain	2	Q
4	Fernand de Montigny	Belgium	3	
4	Frederic Schenck	United States	3	
6	Hendrik de Iongh	Netherlands	4	

==== Quarterfinal B ====
Rank	Fencer	Nation	Losses	Notes
1	Philippe le Hardy	Belgium	0	Q
2	William Bowman	United States	2	Q
3	Miloš Klika	Bohemia	2	Q
4	Sotirios Notaris	Greece	2	
5	Gavriil Bertrain	Russian Empire	4	
5	Arthur Everitt	Great Britain	4	

==== Quarterfinal C ====
Rank	Fencer	Nation	Losses	Notes
1	František Kříž	Bohemia	1	Q
2	Edgar Amphlett	Great Britain	2	Q
3	Einar Levison	Denmark	2	Q
4	Jacques Ochs	Belgium	4	
4	Hans Thomson	Germany	4	
6	Lars Aas	Norway	4	

==== Quarterfinal D ====
Rank	Fencer	Nation	Losses	Notes
1	Paul Anspach	Belgium	2	Q
2	Robert Montgomerie	Great Britain	2	Q
3	Georgios Petropoulos	Greece	2	Q
4	Jan de Beaufort	Netherlands	3	
4	Arthur Griez	Austria	3	
6	Severin Finne	Norway	3	

==== Quarterfinal E ====
Rank	Fencer	Nation	Losses	Notes
1	Einar Sörensen	Sweden	1	Q
2	Gerald Ames	Great Britain	2	Q
2	Petros Manos	Greece	2	Q
4	George Breed	United States	3	
4	Sigurd Mathiesen	Norway	3	
6	Emil Schön	Germany	4	

==== Quarterfinal F ====
Rank	Fencer	Nation	Losses	Notes
1	Vilém Goppold, Jr.	Bohemia	1	Q
2	Victor Boin	Belgium	2	Q
2	Gustaf Lindblom	Sweden	2	Q
4	Trifon Triantafyllakos	Greece	3	
5	Charles Vanderbyl	Great Britain	4	
6	Jens Berthelsen	Denmark	5	

==== Quarterfinal G ====
Rank	Fencer	Nation	Losses	Notes
1	Henri Anspach	Belgium	0	Q
2	Adrianus de Jong	Netherlands	2	Q
2	Pál Rosty	Hungary	2	Q
4	Konstantinos Kotzias	Greece	3	
5	Karel Goppold	Bohemia	4	
5	Louis Sparre	Sweden	4	

==== Quarterfinal H ====
Rank	Fencer	Nation	Losses	Notes
1	Léon Tom	Belgium	1	Q
2	Georg Branting	Sweden	1	Q
3	Martin Holt	Great Britain	2	Q
4	Georgios Versis	Greece	3	
5	Zdeněk Bárta	Bohemia	4	
5	Albertson van zo Post	United States	3	

=== Semifinals ===
==== Semifinal A ====
Rank	Fencer	Nation	Losses	Notes
1	Einar Sörensen	Sweden	1	Q
1	Léon Tom	Belgium	1	Q
3	William Bowman	United States	3	
3	Petros Manos	Greece	3	
5	Edgar Amphlett	Great Britain	4	
5	Zdeněk Vávra	Bohemia	4	

==== Semifinal B ====
Rank	Fencer	Nation	Losses	Notes
1	Edgar Seligman	Great Britain	0	Q
2	Paul Anspach	Belgium	0	Q
3	Adrianus de Jong	Netherlands	2	
4	Gerald Ames	Great Britain	3	
4	Pál Rosty	Hungary	3	
6	Miloš Klika	Bohemia	5	

==== Semifinal C ====
Rank	Fencer	Nation	Losses	Notes
1	Victor Boin	Belgium	2	Q
1	Ivan Osiier	Denmark	2	Q
3	Henri Anspach	Belgium	2	
4	Gustaf Lindblom	Sweden	3	
4	Robert Montgomerie	Great Britain	3	
6	František Kříž	Bohemia	5	

==== Semifinal D ====
Rank	Fencer	Nation	Losses	Notes
1	Philippe le Hardy	Belgium	2	Q
1	Martin Holt	Great Britain	2	Q
3	Georgios Petropoulos	Greece	2	
4	Georg Branting	Sweden	4	
4	Einar Levison	Denmark	4	
6	Vilém Goppold, Jr.	Bohemia	4	

=== Final ===
Three of Holt's matches were double-losses: those against le Hardy, Boin, and Seligman.

Rank	Fencer	Nation	Wins	Losses
1st place, gold medalist(s)	Paul Anspach	Belgium	6	1
2nd place, silver medalist(s)	Ivan Osiier	Denmark	5	2
3rd place, bronze medalist(s)	Philippe le Hardy	Belgium	4	3
4	Victor Boin	Belgium	4	3
5	Einar Sörensen	Sweden	3	4
6	Edgar Seligman	Great Britain	2	5
7	Léon Tom	Belgium	1	6
8	Martin Holt	Great Britain	0	7

== Results summary ==
Rank	Fencer	Nation	Round 1 Rank	Quarterfinals Rank	Semifinals Rank	Final	
Rank	Fencer	Nation	Round 1 Rank	Quarterfinals Rank	Semifinals Rank	Wins	Losses
1st place, gold medalist(s)	Paul Anspach	Belgium	1st	1st	2nd	6	1
2nd place, silver medalist(s)	Ivan Osiier	Denmark	1st	1st	1st	5	2
3rd place, bronze medalist(s)	Philippe le Hardy	Belgium	2nd	1st	1st	4	3
4	Victor Boin	Belgium	1st	2nd	1st	4	3
5	Einar Sörensen	Sweden	1st	1st	1st	3	4
6	Edgar Seligman	Great Britain	1st	3rd	1st	2	5
7	Léon Tom	Belgium	2nd	1st	1st	1	6
8	Martin Holt	Great Britain	2nd	3rd	1st	0	7
9	Henri Anspach	Belgium	1st	1st	3rd	Did not advance	
9	William Bowman	United States	3rd	2nd	3rd	Did not advance	
9	Adrianus de Jong	Netherlands	2nd	2nd	3rd	Did not advance	
9	Petros Manos	Greece	1st	2nd	3rd	Did not advance	
9	Georgios Petropoulos	Greece	1st	3rd	3rd	Did not advance	
14	Gerald Ames	Great Britain	2nd	2nd	4th	Did not advance	
14	Georg Branting	Sweden	1st	2nd	4th	Did not advance	
14	Einar Levison	Denmark	1st	3rd	4th	Did not advance	
14	Gustaf Lindblom	Sweden	1st	2nd	4th	Did not advance	
14	Robert Montgomerie	Great Britain	1st	2nd	4th	Did not advance	
14	Pál Rosty	Hungary	1st	2nd	4th	Did not advance	
20	Edgar Amphlett	Great Britain	1st	2nd	5th	Did not advance	
20	Zdeněk Vávra	Bohemia	1st	1st	5th	Did not advance	
22	Vilém Goppold, Jr.	Bohemia	1st	1st	6th	Did not advance	
22	Miloš Klika	Bohemia	3rd	3rd	6th	Did not advance	
22	František Kříž	Bohemia	2nd	1st	6th	Did not advance	
25	Jan de Beaufort	Netherlands	2nd	4th	Did not advance		
25	George Breed	United States	3rd	4th	Did not advance		
25	Arthur Griez	Austria	3rd	4th	Did not advance		
25	Konstantinos Kotzias	Greece	1st	4th	Did not advance		
25	Sigurd Mathiesen	Norway	3rd	4th	Did not advance		
25	Fernand de Montigny	Belgium	2nd	4th	Did not advance		
25	Sotirios Notaris	Greece	3rd	4th	Did not advance		
25	Jacques Ochs	Belgium	1st	4th	Did not advance		
25	Frederic Schenck	United States	1st	4th	Did not advance		
25	Hans Thomson	Germany	1st	4th	Did not advance		
25	Trifon Triantafyllakos	Greece	2nd	4th	Did not advance		
25	Georgios Versis	Greece	3rd	4th	Did not advance		
37	Zdeněk Bárta	Bohemia	2nd	5th	Did not advance		
37	Gavriil Bertrain	Russian Empire	2nd	5th	Did not advance		
37	Arthur Everitt	Great Britain	2nd	5th	Did not advance		
37	Karel Goppold	Bohemia	3rd	5th	Did not advance		
37	Albertson van zo Post	United States	1st	5th	Did not advance		
37	Louis Sparre	Sweden	3rd	5th	Did not advance		
37	Charles Vanderbyl	Great Britain	1st	5th	Did not advance		
44	Lars Aas	Norway	1st	6th	Did not advance		
44	Jens Berthelsen	Denmark	3rd	6th	Did not advance		
44	Severin Finne	Norway	3rd	6th	Did not advance		
44	Hendrik de Iongh	Netherlands	1st	6th	Did not advance		
44	Emil Schön	Germany	2nd	6th	Did not advance		
49	Hans Bergsland	Norway	4th	Did not advance			
49	Willem van Blijenburgh	Netherlands	4th	Did not advance			
49	Bjarne Eriksen	Norway	4th	Did not advance			
49	Sherman Hall	United States	4th	Did not advance			
49	Graeme Hammond	United States	4th	Did not advance			
49	Vladimir Kayser	Russian Empire	4th	Did not advance			
49	Marc Larimer	United States	4th	Did not advance			
49	Sydney Martineau	Great Britain	4th	Did not advance			
49	Lauritz Østrup	Denmark	4th	Did not advance			
49	Hermann Plaskuda	Germany	4th	Did not advance			
49	Harald Platou	Norway	4th	Did not advance			
49	George van Rossem	Netherlands	4th	Did not advance			
49	Gaston Salmon	Belgium	4th	Did not advance			
49	Vladimir Sarnavsky	Russian Empire	4th	Did not advance			
49	Alfred Sauer	United States	4th	Did not advance			
49	Friedrich Schwarz	Germany	4th	Did not advance			
49	Ernest Stenson-Cooke	Great Britain	4th	Did not advance			
49	Christopher von Tangen	Norway	4th	Did not advance			
49	Victor Willems	Belgium	4th	Did not advance			
68	Oluf Berntsen	Denmark	5th	Did not advance			
68	John Blake	Great Britain	5th	Did not advance			
68	Percival Davson	Great Britain	5th	Did not advance			
68	Knut Enell	Sweden	5th	Did not advance			
68	Jacob van Geuns	Netherlands	5th	Did not advance			
68	Josef Javůrek	Bohemia	5th	Did not advance			
68	Julius Lichtenfels	Germany	5th	Did not advance			
68	Lev Martyushev	Russian Empire	5th	Did not advance			
68	Walther Meienreis	Germany	5th	Did not advance			
68	Albertus Perk	Netherlands	5th	Did not advance			
68	Josef Pfeiffer	Bohemia	5th	Did not advance			
68	Aleksandr Soldatenkov	Russian Empire	5th	Did not advance			
80	Marcel Berré	Belgium	6th	Did not advance			
80	Åke Grönhagen	Sweden	6th	Did not advance			
80	Willem Molijn	Netherlands	6th	Did not advance			
80	Heinrich Schrader	Germany	6th	Did not advance			
84	Gordon Alexander	Great Britain	7th	Did not advance			
84	Béla Békessy	Hungary	7th	Did not advance			
84	Walter Gate	South Africa	7th	Did not advance			
84	John Gignoux	United States	7th	Did not advance			
84	Pavel Guvorsky	Russian Empire	7th	Did not advance			
84	John MacLaughlin	United States	7th	Did not advance			
84	James Moore	United States	7th	Did not advance			
91	Hans Olsen	Denmark	8th	Did not advance			
92	Fernando Correia	Portugal	DSQ	Did not advance			
92	Viliam Tvrzský	Bohemia	DSQ	Did not advance			
—	A M Hassanein	Egypt	DNS	Did not advance			
