= Fencing at the 1912 Summer Olympics – Men's foil =

Fencing at the Olympics

Men's foil at the Games of the V Olympiad
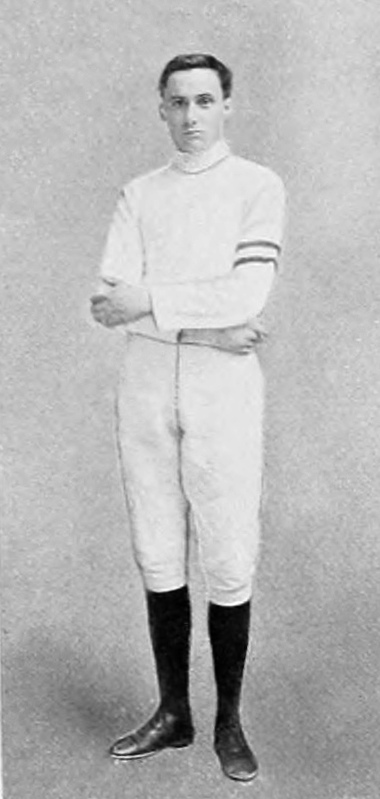
- Nedo Nadi
- Venue: Östermalm Athletic Grounds
- Dates: July 6–8, 1912
- Competitors: 94 from 15 nations

Medalists
1st place, gold medalist(s)		Nedo Nadi	Italy
2nd place, silver medalist(s)		Pietro Speciale	Italy
3rd place, bronze medalist(s)		Richard Verderber	Austria

The men's foil was a fencing event held as part of the Fencing at the 1912 Summer Olympics programme in Stockholm, Sweden. It was the fourth appearance of the event, which had not been contested in 1908. There were 94 competitors from 15 nations, a large increase from the 9 fencers who had competed in 1904. The event was won by Nedo Nadi of Italy, the first of his two victories in the event. His countryman Pietro Speciale took silver, while Richard Verderber of Austria took bronze.

== Background ==
This was the fourth appearance of the event, which has been held at every Summer Olympics except 1908 (when there was a foil display only rather than a medal event). The organizers of the 1912 Games explicitly rejected the 1908 organizers' view that foil fencing was not suitable for competition. The only fencer from 1904 to return was silver medalist Albertson Van Zo Post of the United States. France and Italy were the strongest nations in foil fencing; a dispute over the rules led to the French team boycotting the fencing competitions.

Bohemia, Denmark, Great Britain, Hungary, the Netherlands, Norway, Russia, and South Africa each made their debut in the men's foil. The United States made its third appearance, having missed only the inaugural 1896 competition.

== Competition format ==
The event used a four-round format. In each round, the fencers were divided into pools to play a round-robin within the pool. Bouts were to five touches. Standard foil rules were used, including that touches had to be made with the tip of the foil, the target area was limited to the torso, and priority determined the winner of double touches. However, there were significant disputes over particulars of the rules, which led to the French boycott.

- Round 1: There were 16 pools, each of between 4 and 7 fencers. The top 3 fencers in each pool advanced to the quarterfinals.
- Quarterfinals: There were 8 pools of 6 fencers each. The top 3 fencers in each quarterfinal advanced to the semifinals.
- Semifinals: There were 4 pools of 6 fencers each. The top 2 fencers in each semifinal advanced to the final.
- Final: The final pool had 8 fencers.

== Schedule ==
Date	Time	Round
Saturday, 6 July 1912	8:00; 13:00; 16:00	Round 1 pools A–D; Round 1 pools E–H; Round 1 pools I–L
Sunday, 7 July 1912	8:00; 13:00; 16:00	Round 1 pools M–P; Quarterfinals pools A–D; Quarterfinals pools E–H
Monday, 8 July 1912	9:00; 13:00	Semifinals; Final

== Results ==
=== Round 1 ===
==== Pool A ====
Rank	Fencer	Nation	Losses	Notes
1	Léon Tom	Belgium	0	Q
2	Viliam Tvrzský	Bohemia	1	Q
3	Dezső Földes	Hungary	2	Q
4	Dmitry Knyazhevich	Russia	3	
4	Andreas Suttner	Austria	3	

==== Pool B ====
Rank	Fencer	Nation	Losses	Notes
1	Marcel Berré	Belgium	0	Q
2	Marc Larimer	United States	2	Q
2	Edgar Amphlett	Great Britain	2	Q
4	Johannes Adam	Germany	3	
4	Feliks Leparsky	Russia	3	

==== Pool C ====
Rank	Fencer	Nation	Losses	Notes
1	Gordon Alexander	Great Britain	1	Q
1	Albertson van zo Post	United States	1	Q
3	Josef Pfeiffer	Bohemia	2	Q
4	Bertalan Dunay	Hungary	2	
5	Pavel Guvorsky	Russia	4	

==== Pool D ====
Rank	Fencer	Nation	Losses	Notes
1	Nedo Nadi	Italy	0	Q
2	Zoltán Schenker	Hungary	1	Q
3	Scott Breckenridge	United States	3	Q
4	Miloš Klika	Bohemia	3	
5	Walter Gate	South Africa	4	
5	Percival Davson	Great Britain	4	
7	Julius Thomson	Germany	6	

==== Pool E ====
Rank	Fencer	Nation	Losses	Notes
1	Julius Lichtenfels	Germany	1	Q
2	Arthur Fagan	Great Britain	2	Q
3	Jens Berthelsen	Denmark	3	Q
4	Graeme Hammond	United States	3	
4	Gaston Salmon	Belgium	3	
6	Gustaf Armgarth	Sweden	4	
7	Vladimir Kayser	Russia	5	

==== Pool F ====
Rank	Fencer	Nation	Losses	Notes
1	Francesco Pietrasanta	Italy	0	Q
2	Fernand de Montigny	Belgium	1	Q
3	Sotirios Notaris	Greece	2	Q
4	Lars Aas	Norway	4	
4	Ernest Stenson-Cooke	Great Britain	4	
4	John MacLaughlin	United States	4	
7	Nikolay Goredetsky	Russia	6	

==== Pool G ====
Rank	Fencer	Nation	Losses	Notes
1	Sherman Hall	United States	1	Q
1	Victor Willems	Belgium	1	Q
3	Pietro Speciale	Italy	2	Q
4	Sydney Martineau	Great Britain	3	
4	Aleksandr Mordovin	Russia	3	
6	Hans Olsen	Denmark	4	
6	Carl Personne	Sweden	4	

==== Pool H ====
Rank	Fencer	Nation	Losses	Notes
1	Harold Raynor	United States	0	Q
2	Béla Zulavsky	Hungary	1	Q
3	Adolf Davids	Germany	2	Q
4	Nils Grönvall	Sweden	3	
5	Vladimir Samoylov	Russia	4	

==== Pool I ====
Rank	Fencer	Nation	Losses	Notes
1	Béla Békessy	Hungary	1	Q
1	Edgar Seligman	Great Britain	1	Q
3	Wilhelm Löffler	Germany	2	Q
4	Josef Javůrek	Bohemia	3	
5	Franz Dereani	Austria	4	
6	John Gignoux	United States	5	

==== Pool J ====
Rank	Fencer	Nation	Losses	Notes
1	Einar Levison	Denmark	0	Q
2	Pál Pajzs	Hungary	1	Q
3	Hermann Plaskuda	Germany	2	Q
4	Josef Puhm	Austria	3	
4	William Bowman	United States	3	
6	Zdeněk Vávra	Bohemia	5	

==== Pool K ====
Rank	Fencer	Nation	Losses	Notes
1	Ivan Osiier	Denmark	0	Q
2	Axel Jöhncke	Sweden	2	Q
3	Friedrich Golling	Austria	2	Q
4	Gavriil Bertrain	Russia	2	

==== Pool L ====
Rank	Fencer	Nation	Losses	Notes
1	Edoardo Alaimo	Italy	0	Q
2	Péter Tóth	Hungary	1	Q
3	Vilém Goppold, Jr.	Bohemia	2	Q
4	Alfred Sauer	United States	3	
5	Albert Naumann	Germany	4	
5	Vladimir Sarnavsky	Russia	4	

==== Pool M ====
Rank	Fencer	Nation	Losses	Notes
1	Paul Anspach	Belgium	0	Q
2	Carl Hjorth	Sweden	1	Q
2	Robert Montgomerie	Great Britain	1	Q
4	Oluf Berntsen	Denmark	3	
4	Lev Martyushev	Russia	3	
6	Christopher von Tangen	Norway	5	
6	Reinhold Trampler	Austria	5	

==== Pool N ====
Rank	Fencer	Nation	Losses	Notes
1	Henri Anspach	Belgium	1	Q
1	Bjarne Eriksen	Norway	1	Q
1	Richard Verderber	Austria	1	Q
4	Adrianus de Jong	Netherlands	3	
5	Anatoly Zhakovlev	Russia	4	
—	A M Hassanein	Egypt	DNS	

==== Pool O ====
Rank	Fencer	Nation	Losses	Notes
1	László Berti	Hungary	1	Q
1	Jacques Ochs	Belgium	1	Q
3	Lauritz Østrup	Denmark	2	Q
4	Heinrich Ziegler	Germany	2	
5	Rudolf Cvetko	Austria	3	
6	František Kříž	Bohemia	5	

==== Pool P ====
Rank	Fencer	Nation	Losses	Notes
1	Fernando Cavallini	Italy	1	Q
1	Robert Hennet	Belgium	1	Q
1	Emil Schön	Germany	1	Q
4	George Breed	United States	3	
5	Leonid Grinev	Russia	4	
6	Gunnar Böös	Sweden	5	

=== Quarterfinals ===
==== Quarterfinal A ====
Rank	Fencer	Nation	Losses	Notes
1	Zoltán Schenker	Hungary	0	Q
2	Nedo Nadi	Italy	1	Q
3	Julius Lichtenfels	Germany	1	Q
4	Gordon Alexander	Great Britain	3	
5	Marc Larimer	United States	4	
5	Léon Tom	Belgium	4	

==== Quarterfinal B ====
Rank	Fencer	Nation	Losses	Notes
1	Béla Zulavsky	Hungary	0	Q
2	Viliam Tvrzský	Bohemia	1	Q
3	Edgar Amphlett	Great Britain	2	Q
4	Jens Berthelsen	Denmark	3	
5	Francesco Pietrasanta	Italy	4	
—	Albertson van zo Post	United States	DNS	

==== Quarterfinal C ====
Rank	Fencer	Nation	Losses	Notes
1	Pietro Speciale	Italy	0	Q
2	Dezső Földes	Hungary	1	Q
2	Edgar Seligman	Great Britain	1	Q
4	Marcel Berré	Belgium	3	
4	Scott Breckinridge	United States	3	
6	Josef Pfeiffer	Bohemia	5	

==== Quarterfinal D ====
Rank	Fencer	Nation	Losses	Notes
1	Edoardo Alaimo	Italy	0	Q
1	Béla Békessy	Hungary	0	Q
3	Sherman Hall	United States	1	Q
4	Adolf Davids	Germany	3	
4	Axel Jöhncke	Sweden	3	
4	Fernand de Montigny	Belgium	3	

==== Quarterfinal E ====
Rank	Fencer	Nation	Losses	Notes
1	Ivan Osiier	Denmark	1	Q
1	Péter Tóth	Hungary	1	Q
1	Victor Willems	Belgium	1	Q
4	Wilhelm Löffler	Germany	3	
4	Sotirios Notaris	Greece	3	
6	Harold Rayner	United States	4	

==== Quarterfinal F ====
Rank	Fencer	Nation	Losses	Notes
1	Henri Anspach	Belgium	1	Q
1	Fernando Cavallini	Italy	1	Q
3	Pál Pajzs	Hungary	2	Q
4	Carl Hjorth	Sweden	3	
5	Arthur Fagan	Great Britain	4	
5	Friedrich Golling	Austria	4	

==== Quarterfinal G ====
Rank	Fencer	Nation	Losses	Notes
1	Robert Hennet	Belgium	1	Q
2	Robert Montgomerie	Great Britain	2	Q
3	Richard Verderber	Austria	2	Q
4	Vilém Goppold, Jr.	Bohemia	3	
4	Lauritz Østrup	Denmark	3	
6	Hermann Plaskuda	Germany	4	

==== Quarterfinal H ====
Rank	Fencer	Nation	Losses	Notes
1	Lázsló Berty	Hungary	1	Q
2	Paul Anspach	Belgium	2	Q
3	Emil Schön	Germany	3	Q
4	Bjarne Eriksen	Norway	3	
4	Einar Levison	Denmark	3	
4	Jacques Ochs	Belgium	3	

=== Semifinals ===
==== Semifinal A ====
Rank	Fencer	Nation	Losses	Notes
1	Edoardo Alaimo	Italy	1	Q
1	Edgar Seligman	Great Britain	1	Q
3	Pál Pajzs	Hungary	2	
3	Zoltán Schenker	Hungary	2	
5	Robert Hennet	Belgium	3	
6	Viliam Tvrzský	Bohemia	4	

==== Semifinal B ====
Rank	Fencer	Nation	Losses	Notes
1	Nedo Nadi	Italy	0	Q
2	Béla Békessy	Hungary	1	Q
3	Paul Anspach	Belgium	2	
3	Emil Schön	Germany	2	
5	Ivan Osiier	Denmark		
—	Edgar Amphlett	Great Britain	DNF	

==== Semifinal C ====
Rank	Fencer	Nation	Losses	Notes
1	Pietro Speciale	Italy	0	Q
2	Robert Montgomerie	Great Britain	2	Q
3	Péter Tóth	Hungary	2	
4	Henri Anspach	Belgium	3	
4	Julius Lichtenfels	Germany	3	
4	Béla Zulavsky	Hungary	3	

==== Semifinal D ====
Rank	Fencer	Nation	Losses	Notes
1	Richard Verderber	Austria	0	Q
1	László Berti	Hungary	0	Q
3	Sherman Hall	United States	2	
3	Victor Willems	Belgium	3	
—	Fernando Cavallini	Italy	DNF	
—	Dezső Földes	Hungary	DNF	

=== Final ===
The first tie-breaker was hits received in victories; Verderber and Berti each were hit 10 times in their 4 wins, while Alaimo was hit 11 times in his 4 wins.

Pos	Fencer	W	L	TF	TA	NN	PS	RV	LB	EA	ES	BB	RM
1st place, gold medalist(s)	Nedo Nadi (ITA)	7	0	35	8		5–1	5–0	5–0	5–1	5–1	5–3	5–2
2nd place, silver medalist(s)	Pietro Speciale (ITA)	5	2	29	24	1–5		5–3	5–2	3–5	5–2	5–4	5–3
3rd place, bronze medalist(s)	Richard Verderber (AUT)	4	3	27	25	0–5	3–5		4–5	5–4	5–2	5–2	5–2
4	László Berti (HUN)	4	3	23	25	0–5	2–5	5–4		5–2	1–5	5–1	5–3
5	Edoardo Alaimo (ITA)	4	3	27	26	1–5	5–3	4–5	2–5		5–3	5–1	5–4
6	Edgar Seligman (GBR)	3	4	23	29	1–5	2–5	2–5	5–1	3–5		5–4	5–4
7	Béla Békessy (HUN)	1	6	20	34	3–5	4–5	2–5	1–5	1–5	4–5		5–4
8	Robert Montgomerie (GBR)	0	7	22	35	2–5	3–5	2–5	3–5	4–5	4–5	4–5	

Source: Official Report, p. 465
