= Fencing at the 1912 Summer Olympics – Men's team épée =

Men's team épée at the Games of the V Olympiad
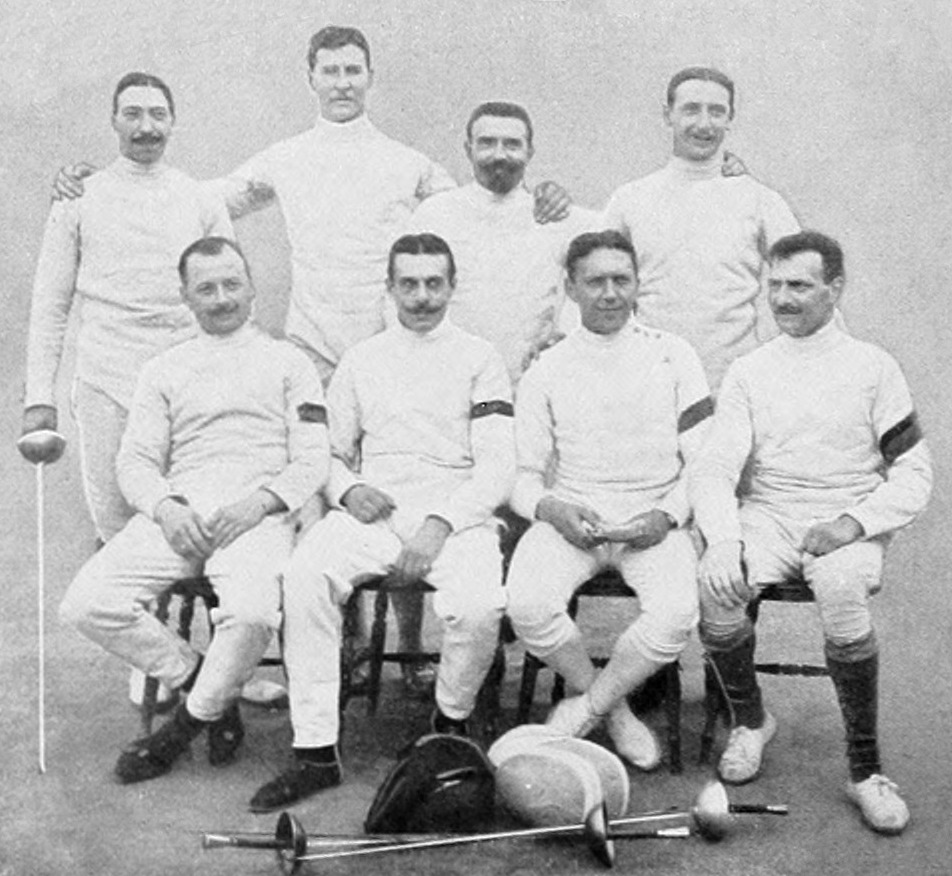
- The winning team of Belgium.
- Venue: Östermalm Athletic Grounds
- Dates: July 9–10, 1912
- Competitors: ? from 11 nations

Medalists
1st place, gold medalist(s)		Belgium: Henri Anspach; Paul Anspach; Fernand de Montigny; Robert Hennet; Jacques Ochs; François Rom; Gaston Salmon; Victor Willems
2nd place, silver medalist(s)		Great Britain: Edgar Amphlett; John Blake; Percival Davson; Arthur Everitt; Martin Holt; Sydney Mertineau; Robert Montgomerie; Edgar Seligman
3rd place, bronze medalist(s)		Netherlands: Willem van Blijenburgh; Jetze Doorman; Adrianus de Jong; George van Rossem; Leonardus Salomonson

The men's team épée was a fencing event held as part of the Fencing at the 1912 Summer Olympics programme. It was the second appearance of the event, which had been introduced in 1908.

Because the rules of fencing had not been unified yet, the Swedish organizers decided on the rules. France did not agree that a hit on the upper arm should not count as a point, and Italy did not agree on the length of the épée, so both countries boycotted this event.

== Rosters ==
Belgium

- Gaston Salmon
- Henri Anspach
- Jacques Ochs
- Paul Anspach
- Robert Hennet
- Victor Willems
- Fernand de Montigny
- François Rom

Bohemia

- Vilém Goppold z Lobsdorfu, Jr.
- Vilém Goppold z Lobsdorfu, Sr.
- Josef Pfeiffer
- František Kříž

Denmark

- Ejnar Levison
- Hans Olsen
- Ivan Osiier
- Lauritz Christian Østrup

Great Britain

- Arthur Everitt
- Edgar Seligman
- Martin Holt
- Percival Davson
- Robert Montgomerie
- Sydney Martineau
- Edgar Amphlett
- John Blake

Germany

- Emil Schön
- Friedrich Schwarz
- Heinrich Ziegler
- Hermann Plaskuda

Greece

- Georgios Petropoulos
- Georgios Versis
- Konstantinos Kotzias
- Petros Manos
- Panagiotis Kambas
- Sotirios Notaris
- Tryfon Triantafyllakos

Netherlands

- Adrianus de Jong
- George van Rossem
- Jetze Doorman
- Leo Nardus
- Willem Hubert van Blijenburgh

Norway

- Hans Bergsland
- Severin Finne
- Lars Aas
- Christopher von Tangen

Russian Empire

- Gavriil Bertrain
- Dmitry Knyazhevich
- Vladimir de Sarnavsky
- Pavel Guvorsky
- Vladimir Kayser
- Aleksandr Soldatenkov
- Lev Martyushev

Sweden

- Einar Sörensen
- Eric Carlberg
- Georg Branting
- Gustaf Lindblom
- Louis Sparre
- Pontus von Rosen

United States

- Albertson Van Zo Post
- George Breed
- John MacLaughlin
- Scott Breckinridge
- Sherman Hall
- William Bowman

== Results ==
=== Quarterfinals ===
Pool A
Place	Fencer	Wins	Losses	Qual.
1	Germany	—		QS
1	Netherlands	—		QS
Pool B
Place	Fencer	Wins	Losses	Qual.
1	Belgium	1	0	QS
1	Great Britain	1	0	QS
3	Russia	0	2	
Pool C
Place	Fencer	Wins	Losses	Qual.
1	Bohemia	1	0	QS
1	Sweden	1	0	QS
3	Norway	0	2	
Pool D
Place	Fencer	Wins	Losses	Qual.
1	Denmark	2	0	QS
2	Greece	1	1	QS
3	United States	0	2	

=== Semifinals ===
Pool A
Place	Fencer	Wins	Losses	Qual.
1	Netherlands	3	0	QF
2	Great Britain	2	1	QF
3	Denmark	1	2	
4	Bohemia	0	3	
Pool B
Place	Fencer	Wins	Losses	Qual.
1	Sweden	3	0	QF
2	Belgium	2	1	QF
3	Greece	1	2	
4	Germany	0	3	

=== Final ===
Final
Place	Fencer	Wins	Losses	Touches	Touched
Gold	Belgium	3	0	32	21
Silver	Great Britain	1	2	26	28
Bronze	Netherlands	1	2	28	30
4	Sweden	1	2	25	32

== Sources ==
- Bergvall, Erik, ed. (1913). The Official Report of the Olympic Games of Stockholm 1912. Translated by Adams-Ray, Edward. Stockholm: Wahlström & Widstrand.
- Wudarski, Pawel (1999). "Wyniki Igrzysk Olimpijskich" (in Polish). Archived from the original on 16 February 2009.
