= Bohemia at the 1912 Summer Olympics =

- IOC code: BOH
- NOC: Bohemian Committee for the Olympic Games

in Stockholm
- Medals: Gold 0 Silver 0 Bronze 0 Total 0

Summer Olympics appearances (overview)
- 1900; 1904; 1908; 1912

Other related appearances
- 1906 Intercalated Games –––– Czechoslovakia (1920–1992); Czech Republic (1994–pres.)

Bohemia competed at the 1912 Summer Olympics in Stockholm, Sweden, for the last time. Beginning at the 1920 Olympic Games, Bohemian athletes would compete for the new nation of Czechoslovakia. Until 1918 Bohemia was part of Austria-Hungary.

At this games, the Bohemian team paraded behind a flag which consisted of the arms of the Kingdom of Bohemia on a white field. In the event of a Bohemian medallist, a Bohemian streamer would be displayed above the Flag of Austria; in the end, this did not occur as Bohemia won no medals.

== Athletics ==
11 athletes competed for Bohemia in 1912. It was the country's third appearance in athletics, having competed in the sport each time the nation appeared at the Olympics. František Janda-Suk, whose silver medal in the discus throw in 1900 was Bohemia's best result in Olympic history and the nation's only athletics medal, placed 15th in that event. That result was the best placing Bohemia got in 1912.

Ranks given are within that athlete's heat.

Athlete	Events	Heat		Semifinal		Final	
Athlete	Events	Result	Rank	Result	Rank	Result	Rank
Bohumil Honzátko	Marathon	N/A				did not finish	
František Janda-Suk	Shot put	N/A		11.15	15	did not advance	
František Janda-Suk	Discus throw	N/A		38.31	17	did not advance	
Ladislav Jiránek	100 m	?	5	did not advance			
Jindřich Jirsák	Pole vault	N/A		3.00	23	did not advance	
Václav Labík-Gregan	100 m	?	5	did not advance			
Václav Labík-Gregan	200 m	?	4	did not advance			
Václav Labík-Gregan	400 m	?	4	did not advance			
Zdeněk Městecký	800 m	did not finish		did not advance			
Vladimír Penc	10000 m	N/A		did not finish		did not advance	
Vladimír Penc	Marathon	N/A				did not finish	
Rudolf Richter	10 km walk	N/A		did not finish		did not advance	
František Slavík	Marathon	N/A				did not finish	
Miroslav Šustera	Discus throw	N/A		31.83	38	did not advance	
Bedřich Vygoda	100 m	11.6	2	?	3	did not advance	

== Cycling ==
5 cyclists represented Bohemia. It was the second appearance of the nation in cycling, in which Bohemia had previously competed in 1900. Bohumil Rameš had the best time in the time trial, the only race held, placing 63rd. Since only three of the five cyclists finished, Bohemia received no ranking in the team competition which required four valid times.

=== Road cycling ===
Cyclist	Events	Final	
Cyclist	Events	Result	Rank
Bohumil Kubrycht	Ind. time trial	14:11:21.0	88
František Kundert	Ind. time trial	did not finish	
Bohumil Rameš	Ind. time trial	12:20:12.2	63
Václav Tintěra	Ind. time trial	14:10:34.6	87
Jan Vokoun	Ind. time trial	did not finish	
Bohumil Kubrycht; Bohumil Rameš; Václav Tintěra; Kundert/Vokoun	Team time trial	did not finish	

== Fencing ==
Thirteen fencers represented Bohemia. It was the second appearance of the nation in fencing, in which Bohemia had previous competed in 1908. Three of the fencers on the 1908 team returned. Vilém Goppold, who had won Bohemia's lone individual medal in 1908 with a bronze in the sabre, competed again, this time alongside two sons, Karel and Vilém, Jr. The sabre team, which had also won a bronze medal in 1908, was the only Bohemian fencing entry to reach the finals in 1912; the team lost all three of its round-robin matches in the final to finish in fourth place.

Fencer	Event	Round 1		Quarterfinal		Semifinal		Final	
Fencer	Event	Record	Rank	Record	Rank	Record	Rank	Record	Rank
Zdeněk Bárta	Épée	1 loss	2 Q	4 losses	5	did not advance			
Zdeněk Bárta	Sabre	1 win	4	did not advance					
Karel Goppold	Épée	2 losses	3 Q	4 losses	5	did not advance			
Vilém Goppold, Jr.	Foil	2 losses	3 Q	3 losses	4	did not advance			
Vilém Goppold, Jr.	Épée	1 loss	1 Q	1 loss	1 Q	4 losses	6	did not advance	
Josef Javůrek	Foil	3 losses	4	did not advance					
Josef Javůrek	Épée	4 losses	5	did not advance					
Josef Javůrek	Sabre	3 wins	2 Q	did not start		did not advance			
Miloš Klika	Foil	3 losses	4	did not advance					
Miloš Klika	Épée	3 losses	3 Q	2 losses	3 Q	5 losses	6	did not advance	
František Kříž	Foil	5 losses	6	did not advance					
František Kříž	Épée	2 losses	2 Q	1 loss	1 Q	5 losses	6	did not advance	
Josef Pfeiffer	Foil	2 losses	3 Q	5 losses	6	did not advance			
Josef Pfeiffer	Épée	4 losses	5	did not advance					
Viliam Tvrzský	Foil	1 loss	2 Q	1 loss	2 Q	4 losses	6	did not advance	
Viliam Tvrzský	Épée	Disqualified		did not advance					
Zdeněk Vávra	Foil	5 losses	6	did not advance					
Zdeněk Vávra	Épée	1 loss	1 Q	1 loss	1 Q	4 losses	5	did not advance	
Zdenek Bárta; Josef Čipera; Vilém Goppold; Josef Javurek; František Kříž; Josef Pfeiffer; Bedrich Schejbal; Otakar Švorcík	Team sabre	N/A		Bye		3–0	1 Q	0–3	4
Vilém Goppold; Vilém Goppold, Jr. Josef Javurek; Miroslav Klika; František Kříž; Josef Pfeiffer; Vilém Tvrzský; Zdenek Vávra	Team épée	N/A		1–0	1 Q	0–3	4	did not advance	

== Gymnastics ==
A single gymnast, Bohumil Honzátko, represented Bohemia. He placed 36th in the men's individual all-around—exactly matching his performance from 1908. It was Bohemia's third appearance in gymnastics.

=== Artistic ===
Gymnast	Events	Final	
Gymnast	Events	Result	Rank
Bohumil Honzátko	All-around	91.25	36

== Rowing ==
One rower represented Bohemia. It was the nation's only appearance in rowing. Šourek did not finish his heat in the first round, abandoning the race after it became clear that he would lose.

(Ranks given are within each crew's heat.)

Rower	Event	Heats		Quarterfinals		Semifinals		Final	
Rower	Event	Result	Rank	Result	Rank	Result	Rank	Result	Rank
Jan Šourek	Single sculls	did not finish		did not advance					

== Tennis ==
Eight tennis players represented Bohemia at the 1912 Games. It was the nation's third appearance in tennis, in which Bohemia had competed each time the nation had appeared at the Olympics.

The Bohemian team was unable to capture any medals, though Žemla-Rázný twice advanced to the semifinals: once in the outdoor singles and once with Just in the outdoor doubles. Both times the Bohemian side lost the semifinal and the bronze medal match that followed to finish fourth.

Men

Athlete	Event	Round of 128	Round of 64	Round of 32	Round of 16	Quarterfinals	Semifinals	Final	
Athlete	Event	Opposition Score	Opposition Score	Opposition Score	Opposition Score	Opposition Score	Opposition Score	Opposition Score	Rank
Jaroslav Hainz	Indoor singles	N/A		Kempe (SWE); L 6–1, 6–4, 3–6, 6–3	did not advance				16
Jaroslav Just	Outdoor singles	Bye	Spiess (GER); L 2–6, 6–3, 3–6, 6–3, 6–1	did not advance					31
Jiří Kodl	Outdoor singles	Tapscott (RSA); L 6–4, 6–1, 6–2	did not advance						51
Karel Robětín-Fuchs	Outdoor singles	Bye	Bye	Zborzil (AUT); L 6–4, 6–2, 6–1	did not advance				17
Karel Robětín-Fuchs	Indoor singles	N/A		Bye	Bye	Dixon (GBR); L 6–2, 6–4, 6–1	did not advance		9
Josef Šebek	Outdoor singles	Bye	Bye	Stibolt (NOR); W 6–1, 6–3, 6–0	Zborzil (AUT); L 6–1, 6–0, 3–6, 6–2	did not advance			9
Jaromír Zeman	Outdoor singles	Bye	Wennergren (SWE); L 6–1, 6–0, 6–0	did not advance					31
Ladislav Žemla-Rázný	Outdoor singles	Bye	Bye	Bye	Tapscott (RSA); W 1–6, 4–6, 6–2, 6–4, 6–2	von Müller (GER); W 6–4, 7–5, 6–4	Kitson (RSA); L 2–6, 6–3, 6–2, 4–6, 6–2	Kreuzer (GER); L 6–2, 3–6, 6–3, 6–1	4
Bohuslav Hykš-Černý; Josef Šebek	Outdoor doubles	N/A		Madsen & Thayssen (DEN); L 6–3, 6–4, 6–4	did not advance				15
Jaroslav Just; Ladislav Žemla-Rázný	Outdoor doubles	N/A		Angell & Stibolt (NOR); W 6–1, 6–2, 6–0	Langaard & Petersen (NOR); W 6–1, 7–2, 6–4	Heyden & Spiess (GER); W 6–0, 8–6, 6–4	Kitson & Winslow (RSA); L 4–6, 6–1, 7–5, 6–4	Canet & Mény (FRA); L 13–11, 6–3, 8–6	4
Karel Robětín-Fuchs; Jaromír Zeman	Outdoor doubles	N/A		Kehrling & Zsigmondy (HUN); L 3–6, 6–1, 6–4, 6–4	did not advance				15

== Wrestling ==
=== Greco-Roman ===
Bohemia sent four wrestlers in 1912. It was the nation's second Olympic wrestling appearance, with the nation not having competed in the Olympics in 1896 or 1904 and wrestling not having been on the programme in 1900. The team, compiling an aggregate 7–8 record, had much better success than Bohemia's first wrestling team, which went 0–4. Balej had the best result of any Bohemian wrestler, advancing to the sixth round before suffering his second loss and consequent elimination.

Wrestler	Class	First round	Second round	Third round	Fourth round	Fifth round	Sixth round	Seventh round	Final			
Wrestler	Class	Opposition Result	Opposition Result	Opposition Result	Opposition Result	Opposition Result	Opposition Result	Opposition Result	Match A Opposition Result	Match B Opposition Result	Match C Opposition Result	Rank
Jan Balej	Lightweight	Ruff (GBR); W	Lupton (GBR); W	Frydenlund (NOR); W	Svenson (SWE); W	Väre (FIN); L	Mathiasson (SWE); L	did not advance				6
Josef Beránek	Featherweight	Arneson (NOR); L	Karlsson (SWE); W	Pawłowicz (RUS); W	Leivonen (FIN); L	did not advance						12
Karel Halík	Lightweight	Flygare (SWE); L	Kippasto (RUS); W	Laitinen (FIN); L	did not advance							23
František Kopřiva	Light heavyweight	Andersson (SWE); L	Nilsson (SWE); L	did not advance								20
