= Greece at the 1912 Summer Olympics =

- IOC code: GRE
- NOC: Committee of the Olympic Games

in Stockholm Sweden
- Competitors: 22 in 5 sports
- Flag bearer: Konstantinos Tsiklitiras
- Medals Ranked 15th: Gold 1 Silver 0 Bronze 1 Total 2

Summer Olympics appearances (overview)
- 1896; 1900; 1904; 1908; 1912; 1920; 1924; 1928; 1932; 1936; 1948; 1952; 1956; 1960; 1964; 1968; 1972; 1976; 1980; 1984; 1988; 1992; 1996; 2000; 2004; 2008; 2012; 2016; 2020; 2024; 2028

Other related appearances
- 1906 Intercalated Games

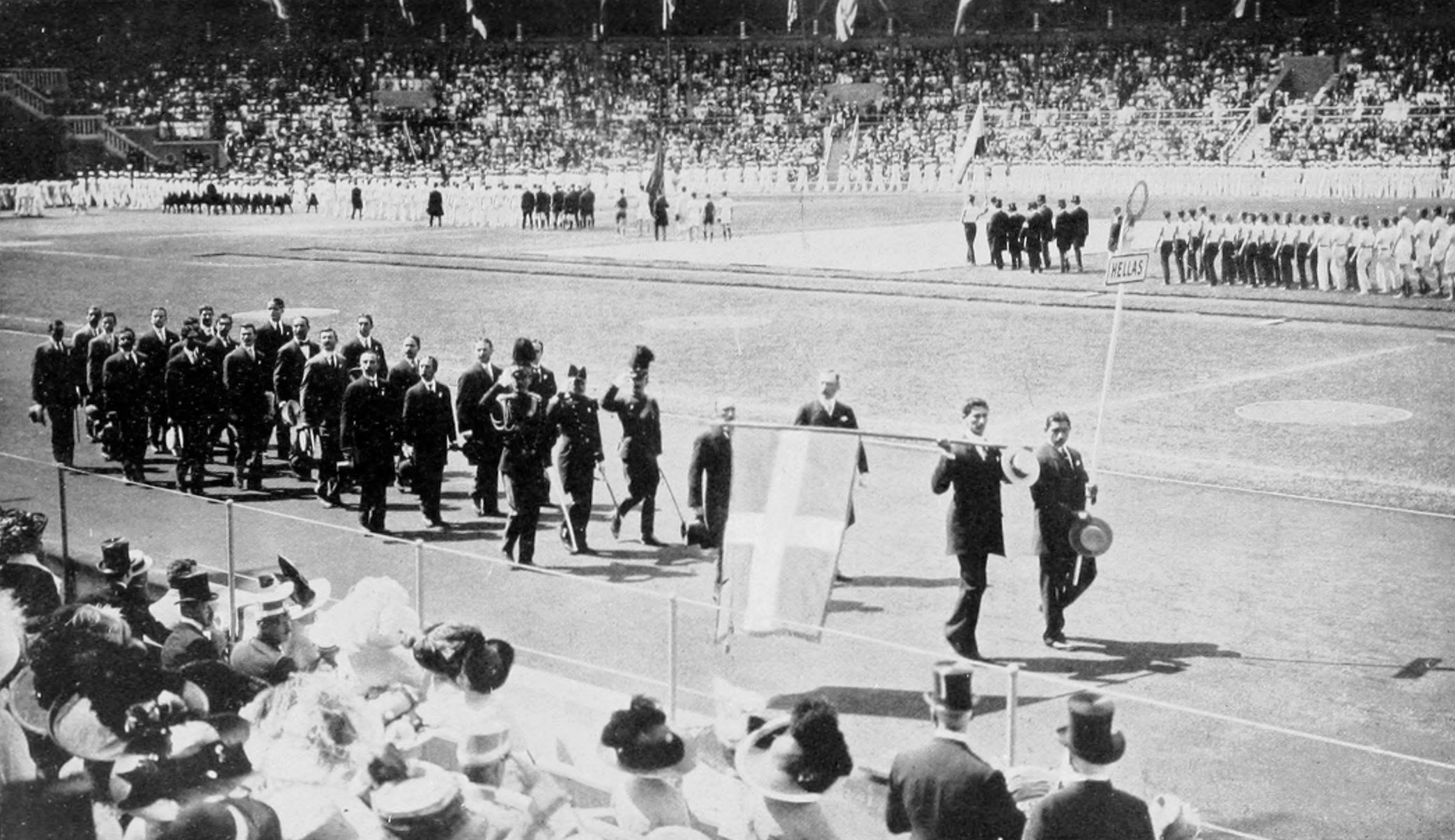
The team of Greece at the opening ceremony.

Greece competed at the 1912 Summer Olympics in Stockholm, Sweden. 22 competitors, all men, took part in 25 events in five sports. Greek athletes have competed in all Summer Olympic Games.

== Medalists ==
Medal	Name	Sport	Event	Date
Gold	Konstantinos Tsiklitiras	Athletics	Men's standing long jump	July 8
Bronze	Konstantinos Tsiklitiras	Athletics	Men's standing high jump	July 13

== Aquatics ==
=== Swimming ===
A single swimmer competed for Greece at the 1912 Games. It was the second time the nation appeared in swimming, and the first since the 1896 Summer Olympics.

Asimakopoulos placed third in the initial heats of his only event, the 100 metre freestyle, and did not advance to the quarterfinals.

Ranks given for each swimmer are within the heat.

Men

Swimmer	Events	Heat		Quarterfinal		Semifinal		Final	
Swimmer	Events	Result	Rank	Result	Rank	Result	Rank	Result	Rank
Andreas Asimakopoulos	100 m freestyle	1:15.4	3	did not advance					

== Athletics ==
5 athletes represented Greece, including three who had competed in the 1908 Summer Olympics. All three had also represented Greece at the 1906 Intercalated Games. It was the fifth appearance of the nation in athletics, in which Greece had competed at each Olympics. Tsiklitiras, who had taken silver medals in both the standing jumps in 1908, again medalled in both with a gold and a bronze this time. Those two medals were the only ones Greece won in 1912 in any sport. Dorizas, the defending silver medalist in the freestyle javelin, suffered from the elimination of that event and did not medal in either of his throwing events. Banikas was the third returner.

Ranks given are within that athlete's heat for running events.

Athlete	Events	Heat		Semifinal		Final	
Athlete	Events	Result	Rank	Result	Rank	Result	Rank
Georgios Banikas	Pole vault	N/A		3.20	18	did not advance	
Michalis Dorizas	Shot put	N/A		12.05	11	did not advance	
Michalis Dorizas	Discus throw	N/A		39.28	13	did not advance	
Iraklis Sakellaropoulos	Marathon	N/A				3:11:37.0	26
Dimitrios Triantafyllakos	100 m	?	5	did not advance			
Konstantinos Tsiklitiras	Standing long jump	N/A		3.37	1 Q	3.37	1st place, gold medalist(s)
Konstantinos Tsiklitiras	Standing high jump	N/A		1.50	1 Q	1.55	3rd place, bronze medalist(s)

== Fencing ==
Seven fencers represented Greece. It was the second appearance of the nation in fencing and the first since 1896. The Greek fencers did not advance to the finals in any event, falling only one place short of qualifying three times.

Fencer	Event	Round 1		Quarterfinal		Semifinal		Final	
Fencer	Event	Record	Rank	Record	Rank	Record	Rank	Record	Rank
Konstantinos Kotzias	Épée	1 loss	1 Q	3 losses	4	did not advance			
Petros Manos	Épée	1 loss	1 Q	2 losses	2 Q	3 losses	3	did not advance	
Sotirios Notaris	Foil	2 losses	3 Q	3 losses	4	did not advance			
Sotirios Notaris	Épée	2 losses	3 Q	2 losses	4	did not advance			
Georgios Petropoulos	Épée	1 loss	1 Q	2 losses	3 Q	2 losses	3	did not advance	
Trifon Triantafyllakos	Épée	2 losses	2 Q	3 losses	4	did not advance			
Georgios Versis	Épée	3 losses	3 Q	3 losses	4	did not advance			
Konstantinos Kotzias; Petros Manos; Georgios Petropoulos; Trifonos Triantafyllakos; Georgios Versis; Panagiotis Kambas	Team épée	N/A		1–1	2 Q	1–2	3	did not advance	

== Shooting ==
Nine shooters competed for Greece. It was the nation's third appearance in shooting. Greek shooters did not win any medals in 1912. Levidis came closest to winning a medal, shooting into a three-way tie for second place in the 300 metre military rifle. In the shoot-off, he finished last of the three to take an overall rank of fourth place.

Shooter	Event	Final	
Shooter	Event	Result	Rank
Nikolaos Levidis	50 m rifle, prone	181	25
Nikolaos Levidis	600 m free rifle	73	52
Nikolaos Levidis	300 m military rifle, 3 pos.	95	4
Nikolaos Levidis	25 m small-bore rifle	192	30
Nikolaos Levidis	100 m deer, single shots	31	15
Nikolaos Levidis	30 m rapid fire pistol	231	34
Frangiskos Mavrommatis	50 m rifle, prone	172	34
Frangiskos Mavrommatis	600 m free rifle	82	22
Frangiskos Mavrommatis	300 m military rifle, 3 pos.	87	17
Frangiskos Mavrommatis	25 m small-bore rifle	204	18
Frangiskos Mavrommatis	30 m rapid fire pistol	263	23
Frangiskos Mavrommatis	50 m pistol	258	29
Anastasios Metaxas	30 m rapid fire pistol	232	35
Anastasios Metaxas	Trap	88	4
Spyridon Mostras	300 m military rifle, 3 pos.	44	88
Konstantinos Skarlatos	50 m pistol	420	30
Konstantinos Skarlatos	30 m rapid fire pistol	261	27
Alexandros Theofilakis	600 m free rifle	66	68
Alexandros Theofilakis	300 m military rifle, 3 pos.	69	67
Alexandros Theofilakis	50 m pistol	369	47
Alexandros Theofilakis	30 m rapid fire pistol	242	33
Ioannis Theofilakis	50 m rifle, prone	173	32
Ioannis Theofilakis	600 m free rifle	79	34
Ioannis Theofilakis	300 m military rifle, 3 pos.	63	75
Ioannis Theofilakis	25 m small-bore rifle	214	21
Ioannis Theofilakis	100 m deer, single shots	24	29
Ioannis Theofilakis	50 m pistol	441	18
Ioannis Theofilakis	30 m rapid fire pistol	263	23
Iakovos Theofilas	50 m rifle, prone	167	37
Iakovos Theofilas	600 m free rifle	13	85
Iakovos Theofilas	300 m military rifle, 3 pos.	66	72
Iakovos Theofilas	25 m small-bore rifle	116	36
Nikolaos Levidis; Frangiskos Mavrommatis; Ioannis Theofilakis; Iakovos Theofilas	25 m team small-bore rifle	716	4
Nikolaos Levidis; Frangiskos Mavrommatis; Ioannis Theofilakis; Iakovos Theofilas	50 m team small-bore rifle	708	5
Frangiskos Mavrommatis; Georgios Petropoulos; Konstantinos Skarlatos; Ioannis Theofilakis	30 m team military pistol	1057	5
Frangiskos Mavrommatis; Konstantinos Skarlatos; Alexandros Theofilakis; Ioannis Theofilakis	30 m team military pistol	1731	5
Nikolaos Levidis; Frangiskos Mavrommatis; Spyridon Mostras; Alexandros Theofilakis; Ioannis Theofilakis; Iakovos Theofilas	Team rifle	1445	7

== Wrestling ==
=== Greco-Roman ===
Greece was represented by a single wrestler in its second Olympic wrestling appearance, its first since the 1896 Games in Athens. Antonopoulos lost his first two matches in the middleweight class and was eliminated at 26th place.

Wrestler	Class	First round	Second round	Third round	Fourth round	Fifth round	Sixth round	Seventh round	Final			
Wrestler	Class	Opposition Result	Opposition Result	Opposition Result	Opposition Result	Opposition Result	Opposition Result	Opposition Result	Match A Opposition Result	Match B Opposition Result	Match C Opposition Result	Rank
Anastasios Antonopoulos	Middleweight	Fältström (SWE); L	Gargano (ITA); L	did not advance								26
