= Netherlands at the 1912 Summer Olympics =

- Flag of the Netherlands
- IOC code: NED
- NOC: Dutch Olympic Committee

in Stockholm
- Competitors: 33 (all men) in 7 sports
- Medals Ranked 18th: Gold 0 Silver 0 Bronze 3 Total 3

Summer Olympics appearances (overview)
- 1900; 1904; 1908; 1912; 1920; 1924; 1928; 1932; 1936; 1948; 1952; 1956; 1960; 1964; 1968; 1972; 1976; 1980; 1984; 1988; 1992; 1996; 2000; 2004; 2008; 2012; 2016; 2020; 2024

Other related appearances
- 1906 Intercalated Games

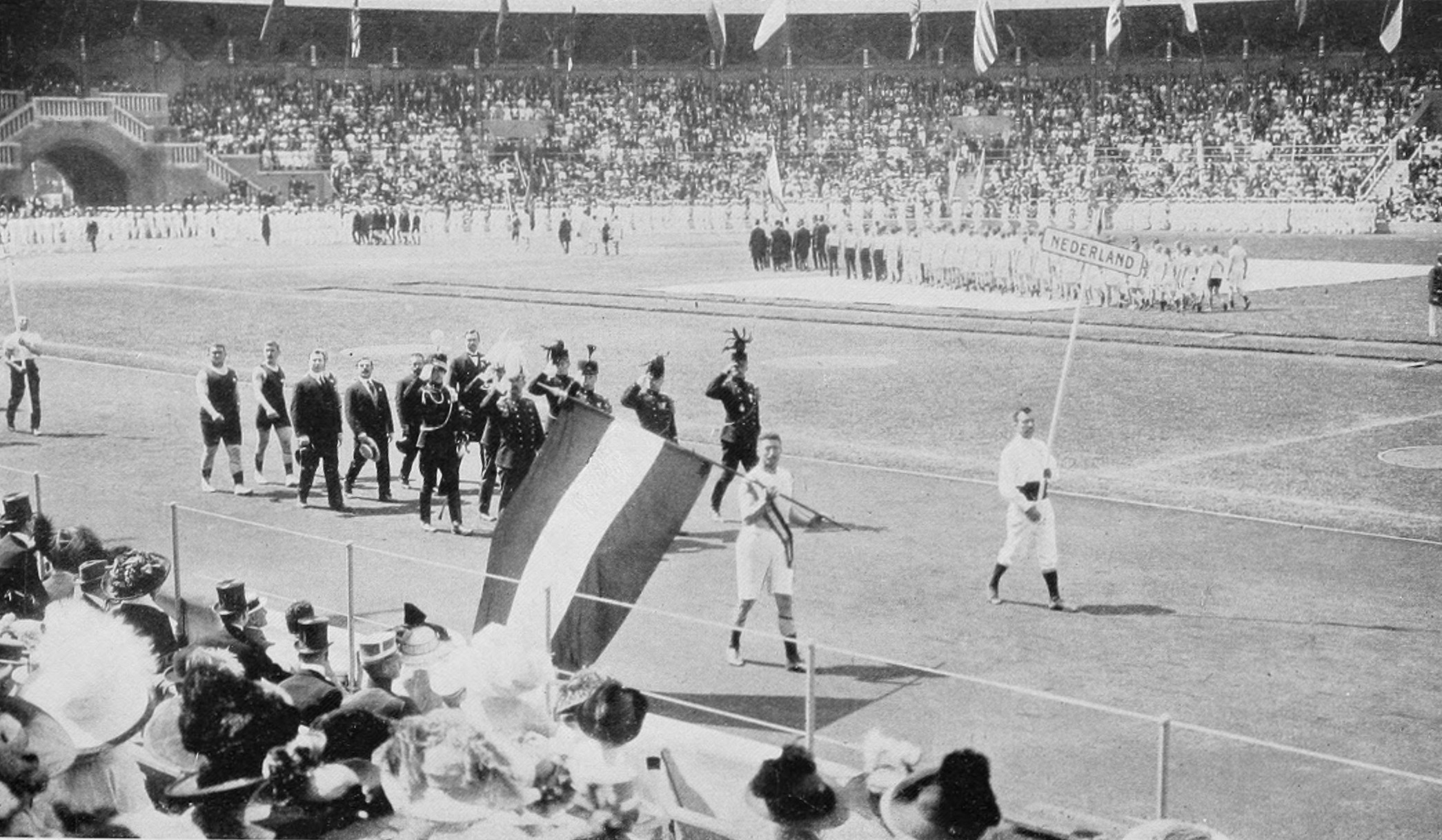
The team of the Netherlands at the opening ceremony.

Athletes from the Netherlands competed at the 1912 Summer Olympics in Stockholm, Sweden. 33 competitors, all men, took part in 14 events in 7 sports.

== Medalists ==
=== Bronze ===
- Adrianus de Jong, Willem van Blijenburgh, Jetze Doorman, Leonardus Salomonson and George van Rossem — Fencing, Men's Team Epee
- Willem van Blijenburgh, George van Rossem, Adrianus de Jong, Jetze Doorman, Dirk Scalongne and Hendrik de Iongh — Fencing, Men's Team Sabre
- Piet Bouman, Joop Boutmy, Nico Bouvy, Jan van Breda Kolff, Caesar ten Cate, Constant Feith, Ge Fortgens, Huug de Groot, Just Göbel, Bok de Korver, Dirk Lotsy, Jan van der Sluis, Jan Vos, David Wijnveldt, and Nico de Wolf — Football, Men's Team Competition

== Athletics ==
A single athlete represented the Netherlands. It was the nation's second appearance in athletics. Grijseels did not advance to the final in either of his two events.

Ranks given are within that athlete's heat for running events.

Athlete	Events	Heat		Semifinal		Final	
Athlete	Events	Result	Rank	Result	Rank	Result	Rank
Jan Grijseels	100 m	?	4	Did not advance			
Jan Grijseels	200 m	?	2	?	6	Did not advance	

== Fencing ==
Twelve fencers represented the Netherlands. It was the third appearance of the nation in fencing, which had competed in the sport each time the nation had appeared at the Olympics. No Dutch fencer advanced to the final in an individual event, but both the épée and sabre teams advanced and won bronze medals. These two medals were the first fencing medals for the Netherlands.

Fencer	Event	Round 1		Quarterfinal		Semifinal		Final	
Fencer	Event	Record	Rank	Record	Rank	Record	Rank	Record	Rank
Jan de Beaufort	Épée	2 losses	2 Q	3 losses	4	Did not advance			
Adrianus de Jong	Foil	3 losses	4	Did not advance					
Adrianus de Jong	Épée	3 losses	2 Q	2 losses	2 Q	2 losses	3	Did not advance	
Hendrik de Iongh	Épée	1 loss	1 Q	4 losses	6	Did not advance			
Hendrik de Iongh	Sabre	3 wins	1 Q	Did not start		Did not advance			
Johannes Kolling	Sabre	0 wins	4	Did not advance					
Willem Molijn	Épée	5 losses	6	Did not advance					
Albertus Perk	Épée	4 losses	5	Did not advance					
Willem van Blijenburgh	Épée	3 losses	4	Did not advance					
Jacob van Geuns	Épée	4 losses	5	Did not advance					
George van Rossem	Épée	4 losses	4	Did not advance					
Willem van Blijenburgh; Adrianus de Jong; Jetze Doorman; Leonardus Nardus; George van Rossem	Team épée	N/A		Bye		3–0	1 Q	1–2	3rd place, bronze medalist(s)
Willem van Blijenburgh; Adrianus de Jong; Hendrik de Iongh; Jetze Doorman; Dirk Scalongne; George van Rossem	Team sabre	N/A		1–1	2 Q	2–1	2 Q	1–2	3rd place, bronze medalist(s)

== Football ==
Roster

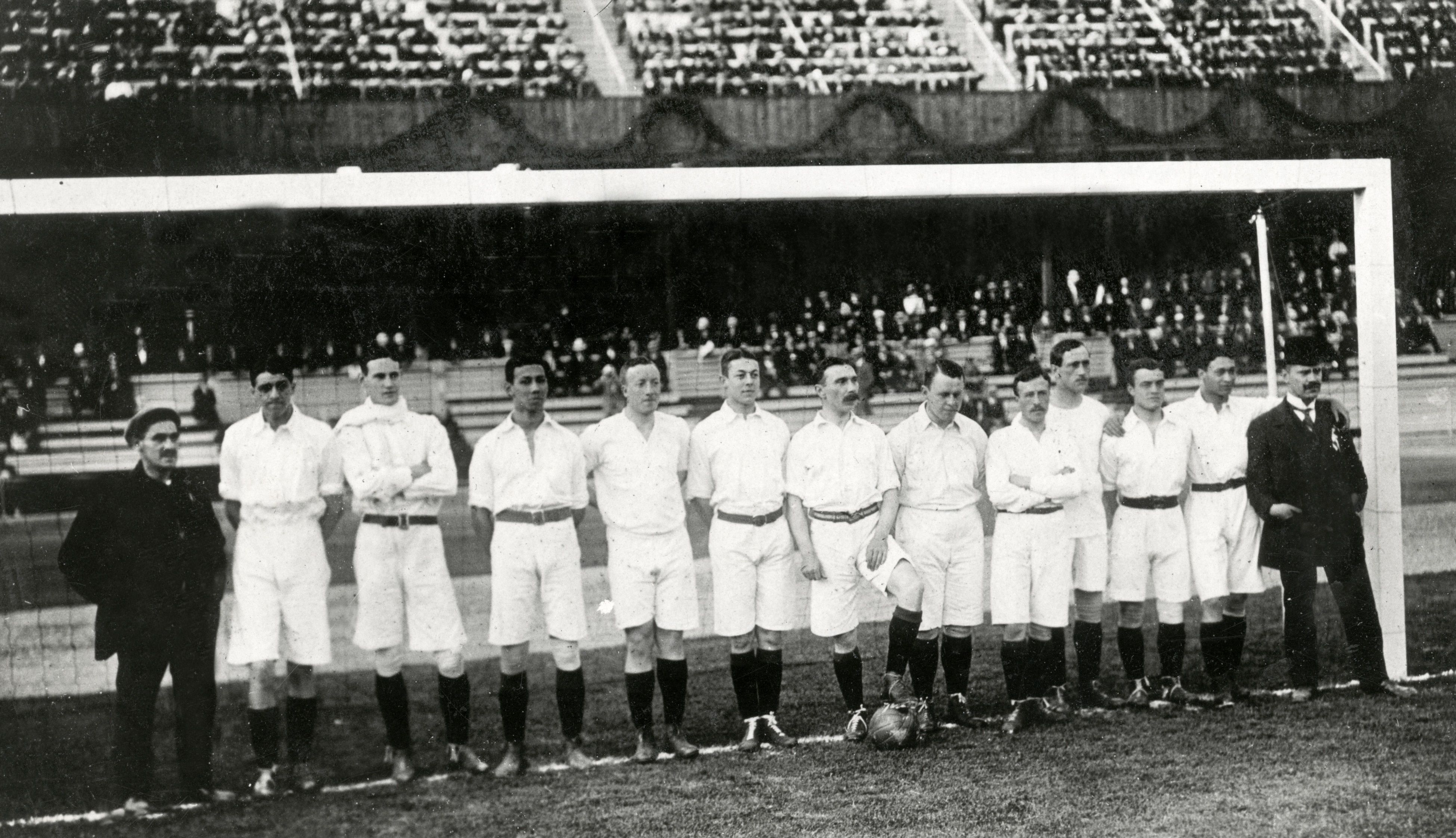
Netherlands squad

Piet Bouman
Joop Boutmy
Nico Bouvy
Huug de Groot
Bok de Korver
Nico de Wolf
Constant Feith
Ge Fortgens
Just Göbel
Dirk Lotsy
Caesar ten Cate
Jan van Breda Kolff
Jan van der Sluis
Jan Vos
David Wijnveldt

Round of 16

1912-06-29

Netherlands	4 – 3 (a.e.t.)	Sweden
Bouvy 28' 52'; Vos 43' 91'		Swensson 3' 80'; Börjesson 62' (pen.)

Olympiastadion, Stockholm
Attendance: 14,000

Quarterfinals

1912-06-30

Netherlands	3 – 1	Austria
Bouvy 8' ten Cate 12'; Vos 30'		Müller 41'

Råsunda Stadium, Stockholm
Attendance: 7,000

Semifinals

1912-07-02

Denmark	4 – 1	Netherlands
Olsen 14' 87'; Jørgensen 7'; P. Nielsen 37'		H. Hansen 85' (o.g.)

Olympiastadion, Stockholm
Attendance: 6,000

Bronze medal match

1912-07-04

Netherlands	9 – 0	Finland
Vos 29' 43' 46' 74' 78' van der Sluis 24' 57' de Groot 28' 86'

Råsunda Stadium, Stockholm
Attendance: 1,000

Final rank
Bronze

== Modern pentathlon ==
The Netherlands had one competitor in the first Olympic pentathlon competition. Doorman did not begin the second phase of the pentathlon.

(The scoring system was point-for-place in each of the five events, with the smallest point total winning.)

Athlete	Shooting		Swimming		Fencing			Riding			Running		Total points	Rank
Athlete	Score	Points	Time	Points	Wins	Touches	Points	Penalties	Time	Points	Time	Points	Total points	Rank
Jetze Doorman	149	21	Did not start		Retired								Did not finish	

== Shooting ==
A single shooter for the Netherlands competed. It was the nation's third appearance in shooting, which the Netherlands had competed each team the nation appeared at the Olympics.

Shooter	Event	Final	
Shooter	Event	Result	Rank
Emile Jurgens	Trap	87	9

== Tennis ==
A single tennis player represented the Netherlands at the 1912 Games. It was the nation's second appearance in tennis. Blom competed only in the outdoor singles, losing his first match.

Men

Athlete	Event	Round of 128	Round of 64	Round of 32	Round of 16	Quarterfinals	Semifinals	Final	
Athlete	Event	Opposition Score	Opposition Score	Opposition Score	Opposition Score	Opposition Score	Opposition Score	Opposition Score	Rank
Otto Blom	Outdoor singles	Bye	Setterwall (SWE); L 6-3, 6-3, 8-6	Did not advance					31

== Wrestling ==
=== Greco-Roman ===
The Netherlands was represented by three wrestlers in its second Olympic wrestling appearance. Sint had the best performance, going to the sixth round before being beaten twice. The team's combined record was 5-6.

Wrestler	Class	First round	Second round	Third round	Fourth round	Fifth round	Sixth round	Seventh round	Final			
Wrestler	Class	Opposition Result	Opposition Result	Opposition Result	Opposition Result	Opposition Result	Opposition Result	Opposition Result	Match A Opposition Result	Match B Opposition Result	Match C Opposition Result	Rank
Barend Bonneveld	Light heavyweight	Backenius (FIN); W	Neser (GER); L	Viljaama (FIN); L	Did not advance			N/A	Did not advance			9
Johannes Eillenbrecht	Lightweight	Tanttu (FIN); L	Kolehmainen (FIN); L	Did not advance								31
Jan Sint	Middleweight	Ohlsson (SWE); W	Hansen (DEN); W	Westerlund (FIN); L	Tirkkonen (FIN); W	Lundstein (FIN); W	Asikainen (FIN); L	Did not advance				6
