= Belgium at the 1912 Summer Olympics =

- IOC code: BEL
- NOC: Belgian Olympic and Interfederal Committee
- Website: www.teambelgium.be (in Dutch and French)

in Stockholm
- Medals Ranked 13th: Gold 2 Silver 1 Bronze 3 Total 6

Summer Olympics appearances (overview)
- 1900; 1904; 1908; 1912; 1920; 1924; 1928; 1932; 1936; 1948; 1952; 1956; 1960; 1964; 1968; 1972; 1976; 1980; 1984; 1988; 1992; 1996; 2000; 2004; 2008; 2012; 2016; 2020; 2024

Other related appearances
- 1906 Intercalated Games

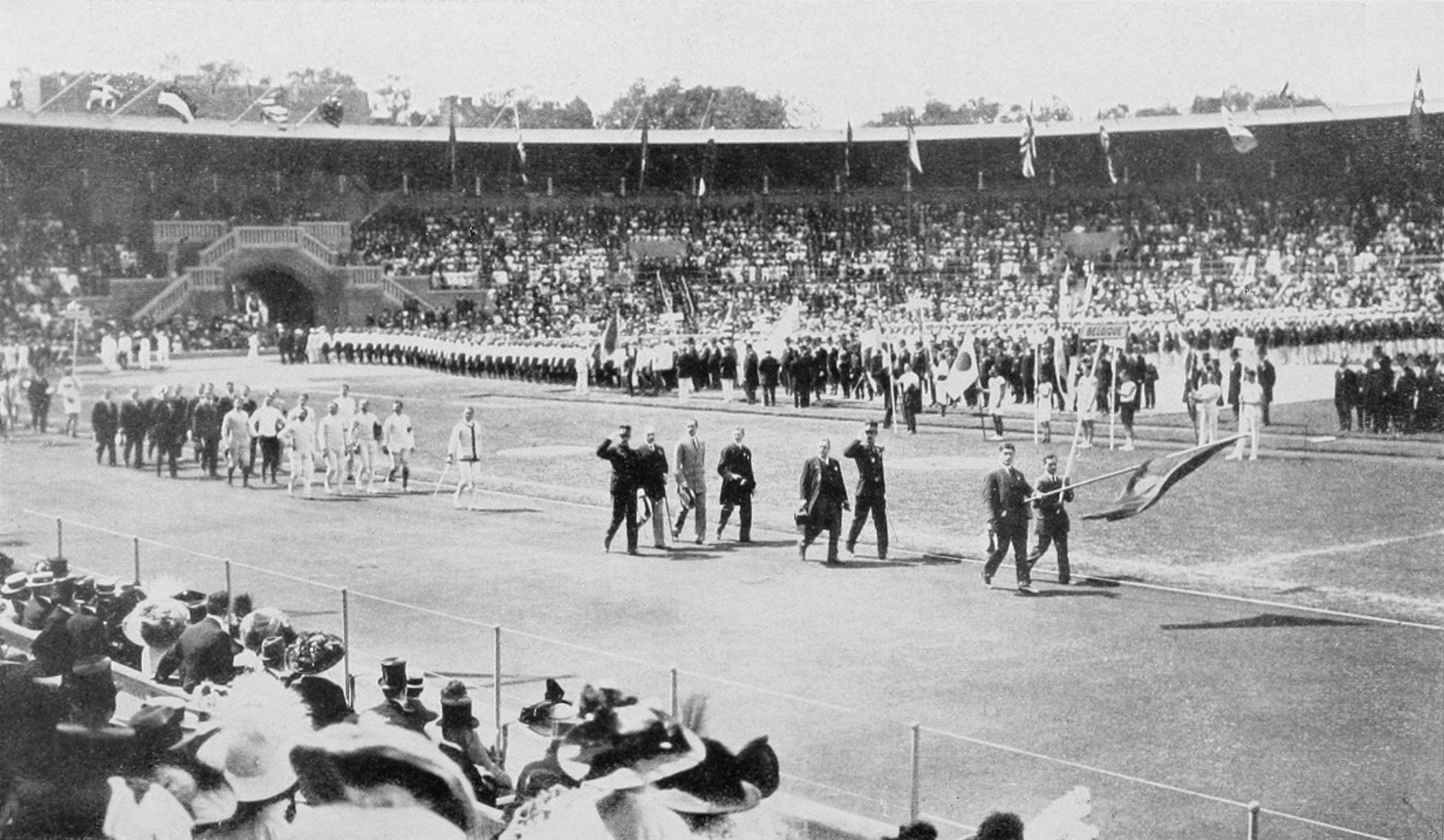
The team of Belgium at the opening ceremony.

Belgium competed at the 1912 Summer Olympics in Stockholm, Sweden.

== Medalists ==
Medal	Name	Sport	Event	Date
Gold	Paul Anspach	Fencing	Men's épée	13 July
Gold	Paul Anspach, Henri Anspach, Robert Hennet, Fernand de Montigny, Jacques Ochs, François Rom, Gaston Salmon and Victor Willems	Fencing	Men's team épée	10 July
Silver	Polydore Veirman	Rowing	Men's single sculls	19 July
Bronze	Emmanuel de Blommaert	Equestrian	Individual jumping	16 July
Bronze	Belgium men's national water polo team: Albert Durant; Herman Donners; Victor Boin; Herman Meyboom; Joseph Pletincx; Oscar Grégoire; Félicien Courbet; Jean Hoffman; Pierre Nijs	Water polo	Men's Team Competition	16 July
Bronze	Philippe Le Hardy De Beaulieu	Fencing	Men's épée	13 July

== Aquatics ==
=== Swimming ===
Five swimmers competed for Belgium at the 1912 Games. It was the third time the nation had competed in swimming, a sport in which Belgium had competed each time the country appeared at the Olympics.

None of the Belgian swimmers advanced to the finals in their individual events; two reached the semifinals.

(Ranks given are within the swimmer's heat.)

Men

Swimmer	Events	Heat		Quarterfinal		Semifinal		Final	
Swimmer	Events	Result	Rank	Result	Rank	Result	Rank	Result	Rank
Félicien Courbet	200 m breaststroke	N/A		3:12.6	1 Q	3:11.6	5	did not advance	
Félicien Courbet	400 m breaststroke	N/A		6:52.6	2 Q	6:59.8	4	did not advance	
Oscar Grégoire	100 m backstroke	N/A		Disqualified		did not advance			
Herman Meyboom	100 m freestyle	1:15.4	3	did not advance					
Jules Wuyts	100 m freestyle	1:13.6	4	did not advance					

Women

Swimmer	Events	Quarterfinal		Semifinal		Final	
Swimmer	Events	Result	Rank	Result	Rank	Result	Rank
Claire Guttenstein	100 m freestyle	?	5	did not advance			

=== Water polo ===
Belgium made its third Olympic water polo appearance in 1912, having competed both times the country had sent athletes to the Olympics previously. After taking the silver medals in 1908 and 1900, the Belgians were only able to win a bronze at these Games.

Belgium had the misfortune of meeting eventual gold medalists Great Britain in the quarterfinals, though this misfortune was mitigated by the use of the Bergvall System in the tournament (giving Belgium an opportunity to take silver even after this defeat). The Belgian squad gave the British side the greatest challenge the latter faced all tournament, taking the match into extra time before falling. In the repechage rounds, the Belgians defeated both of the other quarterfinal losers in turn. They then beat the losing finalist Austrians to set up a match against Sweden for the silver and bronze medals. This was the fifth match of the tournament for Belgium (the most of any team—the Belgians were the only side to play every other team in 1912), and the Swedes proved too much and defeated Belgium 4–2.

Team	Event	Quarterfinals	Semifinals	Finals	Repechage semifinal	Repechage final	Silver round 1	Silver round 2	Silver match	Rank
Team	Event	Opposition Score	Opposition Score	Opposition Score	Opposition Score	Opposition Score	Opposition Score	Opposition Score	Opposition Score	Rank
Belgium	Water polo	Great Britain; L 5–7 a.e.t.	did not advance		Hungary; W 6–5	France; W 4–1	Bye	Austria; W 5–4	Sweden; L 2–4	3rd place, bronze medalist(s)

Quarterfinals

July 7, 1912	Belgium	5–7 a.e.t.	Great Britain	Djurgårdsbrunnsviken
July 7, 1912	Grégoire (2), Meyboom (2), Nijs	Goals	Hill (2), Wilkinson (2), Radmilovic (2), Bentham	Djurgårdsbrunnsviken

Repechage semifinal

July 10, 1912	Belgium	6–5	Hungary	Djurgårdsbrunnsviken
July 10, 1912	?	Goals	Fazekas (3), Rémi, ?	Djurgårdsbrunnsviken

Repechage final

July 11, 1912	Belgium	4–1	France	Djurgårdsbrunnsviken
July 11, 1912	?	Goals	?	Djurgårdsbrunnsviken

Silver round 2

July 15, 1912	Belgium	5–4	Austria	Djurgårdsbrunnsviken
July 15, 1912	?	Goals	Scheff, ?	Djurgårdsbrunnsviken

Silver medal match

July 16, 1912	Belgium	2–4	Sweden	Djurgårdsbrunnsviken
July 16, 1912	?	Goals	Bergqvist (2), V. Andersson, R. Andersson	Djurgårdsbrunnsviken

== Athletics ==
2 athletes competed for Belgium in 1912. It was the country's second appearance in athletics.

Ranks given are within that athlete's heat.

Athlete	Events	Heat		Semifinal		Final	
Athlete	Events	Result	Rank	Result	Rank	Result	Rank
Léon Aelter	100 m	?	2	?	5	did not advance	
Léon Aelter	200 m	?	3	did not advance			
François Delloye	1500 m	N/A		?	6-7	did not advance	

== Cycling ==
A single cyclist represented Belgium. It was the third appearance of the nation in cycling, in which Belgium had competed each time the nation appeared at the Olympics. Jules Patou, who had also competed in 1908, was the only Belgian cyclist and did not finish the time trial.

=== Road cycling ===
Cyclist	Events	Final	
Cyclist	Events	Result	Rank
Jules Patou	Ind. time trial	did not finish	

== Equestrian ==
Dressage

Rider	Horse	Event	Final	
Rider	Horse	Event	Penalties	Rank
Emmanuel de Blommaert	Clonmore	Individual	135	21
Gaston de Trannoy	Capricieux	Individual	117	17

Eventing

(The maximum score in each of the five events was 10.00 points. Ranks given are for the cumulative score after each event. Team score is the sum of the top three individual scores.)

Rider	Horse	Event	Long distance		Cross country		Steeplechase		Show jumping		Dressage		Total	
Rider	Horse	Event	Score	Rank	Score	Rank	Score	Rank	Score	Rank	Score	Rank	Score	Rank
Paul Convert	La Sioute	Individual	10.00	1	9.85	14	10.00	10	8.33	14	did not start		did not finish	
Emmanuel de Blommaert	Clonmore	Individual	10.00	1	Disqualified		Retired						did not finish	
Gaston de Trannoy	Capricieux	Individual	10.00	1	9.69	17	10.00	12	Disqualified		Retired		did not finish	
Guy Reyntiens	Beau Soleil	Individual	10.00	1	Disqualified		Retired						did not finish	
Paul Convert; Emmanuel de Blommaert; Gaston de Trannoy; Guy Reyntiens	La Sioute; Clonmore; Capricieux; Beau Soleil	Team	30.00	1	Disqualified		Retired						did not finish	

Jumping

Rider	Horse	Event	Final	
Rider	Horse	Event	Penalties	Rank
Emmanuel de Blommaert	Clonmore	Individual	5	3rd place, bronze medalist(s)
Guy Reyntiens	Beau Soleil	Individual	29	30
Paul Convert; Emmanuel de Blommaert; Gaston de Trannoy	La Sioute; Clonmore; Capricieux	Team	60	6

== Fencing ==
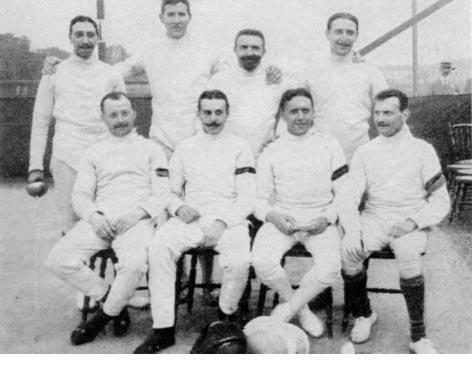
Belgian fencing team at the 1912 Olympic Games

12 fencers represented Belgium. It was the third appearance of the nation in fencing, in which Belgium had competed each time the nation appeared at the Olympics. The Belgians had great success in the épée event, placing four fencers in the final and taking three of the top four places, including the gold and bronze medals. They also took the gold medal in the team épée event. These gold medals were the first Olympic championships won by Belgian fencers; the country's best result before 1912 was a bronze medal. Ragnar Wicksell

Fencer	Event	Round 1		Quarterfinal		Semifinal		Final	
Fencer	Event	Record	Rank	Record	Rank	Record	Rank	Record	Rank
Henri Anspach	Foil	1 loss	1 Q	1 loss	1 Q	3 losses	4	did not advance	
Henri Anspach	Épée	Bye		0 losses	1 Q	2 losses	3	did not advance	
Paul Anspach	Foil	0 losses	1 Q	2 losses	2 Q	2 losses	3	did not advance	
Paul Anspach	Épée	1 loss	1 Q	2 losses	1 Q	0 losses	2 Q	6–1	1st place, gold medalist(s)
Marcel Berré	Foil	0 losses	1 Q	3 losses	4	did not advance			
Marcel Berré	Épée	4 losses	6	did not advance					
Victor Boin	Épée	0 losses	1 Q	2 losses	2 Q	2 losses	1 Q	4–3	4
Fernand de Montigny	Foil	1 loss	2 Q	3 losses	4	did not advance			
Fernand de Montigny	Épée	2 losses	2 Q	3 losses	4	did not advance			
Robert Hennet	Foil	1 loss	1 Q	1 loss	1 Q	3 losses	5	did not advance	
Philippe Le Hardy de Beaulieu	Épée	3 losses	2 Q	0 losses	1 Q	2 losses	1 Q	4–3	3rd place, bronze medalist(s)
Jacques Ochs	Foil	1 loss	1 Q	3 losses	4	did not advance			
Jacques Ochs	Épée	1 loss	1 Q	4 losses	4	did not advance			
Gaston Salmon	Foil	3 losses	4	did not start		did not advance			
Gaston Salmon	Épée	3 losses	4	did not advance					
Léon Tom	Foil	0 losses	1 Q	4 losses	5	did not advance			
Léon Tom	Épée	2 losses	2 Q	1 losses	1 Q	1 losses	1 Q	1–6	7
Victor Willems	Foil	1 loss	1 Q	1 loss	1 Q	3 losses	3	did not advance	
Victor Willems	Épée	3 losses	4	did not advance					
Henri Anspach; Paul Anspach; Marcel Berré; Robert Hennet; Philippe le Hardy; Jacques Ochs; Gaston Salmon; Léon Tom	Team sabre	N/A		1–0	1 Q	1–2	3	did not advance	
Henri Anspach; Paul Anspach; Fernand de Montigny; Robert Hennet; Jacques Ochs; François Rom; Gaston Salmon; Victor Willems	Team épée	N/A		1–0	1 Q	2–1	2 Q	3–0	1st place, gold medalist(s)

== Rowing ==
Six rowers represented Belgium. It was the nation's third appearance in rowing. Veirman took the silver medal in the single sculls, as Belgium took a single silver medal in rowing for the third time.

(Ranks given are within each crew's heat.)

Rower	Event	Heats		Quarterfinals		Semifinals		Final	
Rower	Event	Result	Rank	Result	Rank	Result	Rank	Result	Rank
Polydore Veirman	Single sculls	7:59.2	1 Q	7:45.2	1 Q	7:41.0	1 Q	7:56.0	2nd place, silver medalist(s)
Léonard Nuytens (cox); Georges Van Den Bossche; Edmond Vanwaes; Guillaume Visser; Georges Willems	Coxed four	7:15.0	1 Q	Unknown	2	did not advance			

== Wrestling ==
=== Greco-Roman ===
Belgium sent a single wrestler in 1912. It was the nation's second Olympic wrestling appearance, with the nation not having competed in the Olympics in 1896 or 1904 and wrestling not having been on the programme in 1900. Gerstmans, competing in the heavyweight class, lost his first two matches and was quickly eliminated.

Wrestler	Class	First round	Second round	Third round	Fourth round	Fifth round	Sixth round	Seventh round	Final			
Wrestler	Class	Opposition Result	Opposition Result	Opposition Result	Opposition Result	Opposition Result	Opposition Result	Opposition Result	Match A Opposition Result	Match B Opposition Result	Match C Opposition Result	Rank
Laurent Gerstmans	Heavyweight	Lindstrand (SWE); L	Backenius (FIN); L	did not advance								12
