= Sotirios Notaris =

Sotirios Notaris may refer to:

- Sotirios Notaris (fencer) (1879–1924), Greek Olympic fencer
- Sotirios Notaris (wrestler), Greek Olympic wrestler
