= Wilhelm Löffler =

Wilhelm Löffler may refer to:

- Wilhelm Löffler (medical doctor) (1887–1972), Swiss doctor
- Wilhelm Löffler (fencer) (1886–?), German Olympic fencer
