= Heinrich Schrader =

Heinrich Schrader may refer to:

- Heinrich Schrader (botanist) (1767–1836), German botanist
- Heinrich Schrader (fencer) (1878–?), German Olympic fencer
- Heinrich Schrader (sportsman) (1893–1980), Australian VFL footballer and cricketer
