= Ernest Stenson-Cooke =

British fencer (1874–1942)

Personal information
- Born: 10 May 1874 London, England
- Died: 19 November 1942 (aged 68) Guildford, Surrey, England

Sport
- Sport: Fencing

Sir Ernest George Stenson-Cooke (5 October 1874 – 19 November 1942) was a British fencer.

== Biography ==
From an early age Stenson-Cooke had been interested in military training and for some years was a member of the cadet corps attached to the London Rifle Brigade, where he became part of a club devoted to the reconstruction of historical fencing styles under the direction of Captain Alfred Hutton. Circa 1901 he also joined the Bartitsu Club. He retired from the L.R.B.(with the rank of Captain) in 1903.

He competed in the individual Fencing at the 1912 Summer Olympics – Men's foil and Fencing at the 1912 Summer Olympics – Men's épée events at the 1912 Summer Olympics in Stockholm.

During World War I he served with 8th Essex Territorials, then as a staff captain at the War Office, and was later appointed Controller of Supplies under the Ministry of National Service.

He was the first secretary of The Automobile Association, beginning in 1905 when it was established and serving in that capacity for 37 years. By the start of the First World War, membership of the AA had risen from 90 (when he had been taken on) to 83,000

In 1923, he won the foil title at the British Fencing Championships.

In 1931, he wrote the autobiographical "This Motoring - Being the Romantic Story of the Automobile Association", ISBN 978-1125868041, which was published. Two years later in 1933, he was knighted for services to motoring.
