= Edgar Amphlett =

English fencer (1867–1931)

Personal information
- Born: 1 September 1867 Dorchester, Dorset, England
- Died: 9 January 1931 (aged 63) Chelsea, London, England

Sport
- Sport: Fencing
Medal record
Men's fencing
Representing United Kingdom
Olympic Games
Silver medal – second place	1908 London	Épée, team
Silver medal – second place	1912 Stockholm	Épée, team

Edgar Montague Amphlett (1 September 1867 − 9 January 1931) was an English fencer and journalist. He won a silver medal in the team épée event at the 1908 Summer Olympics.

== Early life ==
Amphlett was born on 1 September 1867 in Dorchester, Dorset, England the son of Henry James Amphlett. Amphlett was educated at Hull Grammar School and at 17 he joined the staff of the Echo and later worked for 16 years in the Press Gallery at the Houses of Parliament. In 1899 he joined the parliamentary staff of The Times.

== First World War ==
During the First World War he first became a war correspondent in France. He remained in Boulogne after the British Army abandoned the town during the retreat from Mons and then moved to Arras joining a stream of refugees and produced a diary that was published in The Times. He wanted to join the Army but he was now in his late forties, eventually in September 1915 he was commissioned as a temporary Staff Captain and he served the next four years in France as a Train Conducting Officer and a Railway Transport Officer.

== Post war ==
In September 1919 Amphlett re-joined the parliamentary staff of The Times. In 1920 he became a special correspondent in Ireland but later that year he was sent to Fiume where he was the only correspondent in the town during the Italian blockade in the days before the surrender of Gabriele d'Annunzio. He later worked in the Paris office of The Times before returning to London in 1925 where he was responsible for special editions of the paper.

== Fencing ==
Before the first world war Amphlett was a leading exponent of Foil and Épée fencing in Great Britain when he won the Épée championship in 1910 followed by the Foil championship in 1911 at the British Fencing Championships. He represented Great Britain at the Olympic Games in 1908 (London), 1912 (Stockholm) and Paris in 1924.

=== Olympic events ===
- 1908 Summer Olympics in London
  - Fencing – Épée, individual
  - Fencing – Épée, team – Silver medal
- 1912 Summer Olympics in Stockholm
  - Fencing – Épée, individual
  - Fencing – Épée, team – Silver medal
  - Fencing – Foil, individual

== Family ==
Amphlett had married Amy Josephine Whitting in 1890 and they had two sons and a daughter.
