= Jens Peter Berthelsen =

Danish fencer (1854–1934)

Personal information
- Born: 15 December 1854 Hillerød, Denmark
- Died: 26 July 1934 (aged 79) Copenhagen, Denmark

Sport
- Sport: Fencing
- Club: Københavns Fægteklub

Jens Peter Berthelsen (15 December 1854 – 26 July 1934) was a Danish fencer. He competed in the individual foil masters event at the 1900 Summer Olympics.

His son Jens Berthelsen was also a fencer.
