= Harald Platou =

Norwegian fencer

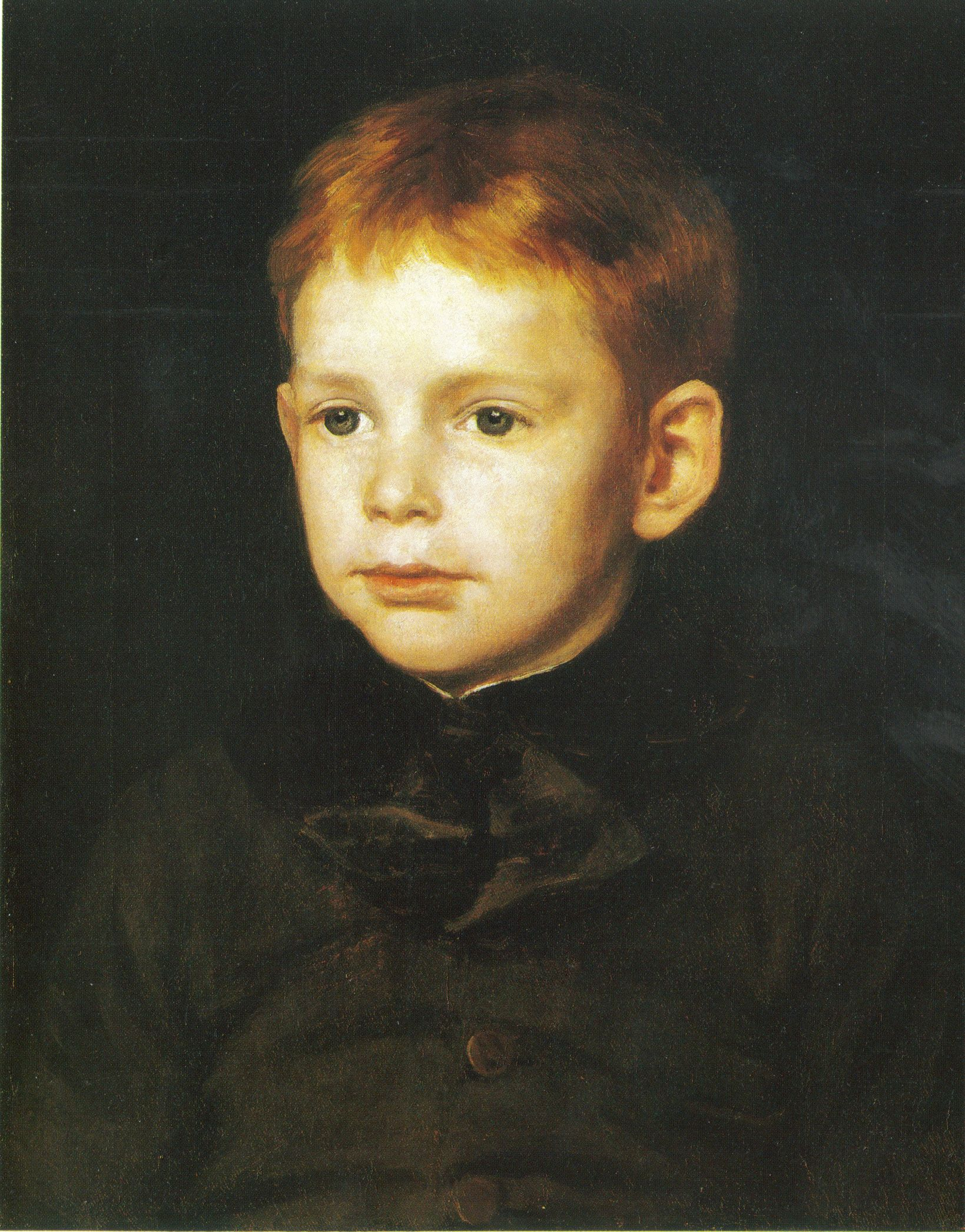
- Harald painted by Peter Nicolai Arbo in 1885

Personal information
- Born: 29 October 1877 Oslo, Norway
- Died: 23 September 1946 (aged 68) Oslo, Norway

Sport
- Sport: Fencing

Harald Platou (29 October 1877 – 23 September 1946) was a Norwegian fencer. He competed in the individual épée event at the 1912 Summer Olympics.
