= Arthur Griez von Ronse =

Austrian fencer

Personal information
- Died: 17 March 1921

Sport
- Sport: Fencing

Arthur Griez von Ronse (died 17 March 1921) was an Austrian fencer. He competed in the individual épée event at the 1912 Summer Olympics.
