= Karl Hjorth =

Swedish fencer

Personal information
- Born: 15 July 1875 Stockholm, Sweden
- Died: 26 April 1949 (aged 73) Stockholm, Sweden

Sport
- Sport: Fencing

Karl Hjorth (15 July 1875 – 26 April 1949) was a Swedish male fencer. He competed at the 1906 and the 1912 Summer Olympics.
