= James Moore (fencer) =

American fencer

Personal information
- Born: August 30, 1890 Detroit, Michigan, United States
- Died: October 28, 1971 (aged 81)

Sport
- Sport: Fencing

James Moore (August 30, 1890 – October 28, 1971) was an American fencer. He competed in the individual épée event at the 1912 Summer Olympics. He graduated from Harvard University and Harvard Law School.
