= Hans Thomson =

German fencer

Personal information
- Born: 14 June 1888 Offenbach am Main, German Empire
- Died: 23 May 1963 (aged 74) Offenbach am Main, West Germany

Sport
- Sport: Fencing

Hans Thomson (14 June 1888 – 23 May 1963) was a German fencer. He competed at the 1912 and 1928 Summer Olympics. He was the twin brother of Julius Thomson, who also competed for Germany at the Olympics in fencing.
