= Charles Van Der Byl =

British fencer (1874–1956)

Personal information
- Born: 5 April 1874 Paddington, London, England
- Died: 9 February 1956 (aged 81) Willesden, London, England

Sport
- Sport: Fencing

Charles Fennelly Van Der Byl (5 April 1874 – 9 February 1956) was a British fencer. He competed in the individual sabre and épée events at the 1912 Summer Olympics. In 1912, he won the sabre title at the British Fencing Championships.
