= Nils Grönvall =

Swedish fencer

Personal information
- Full name: Nils Ragnar Johannes Grönvall
- Born: 15 May 1894 Lund, Sweden
- Died: 13 July 1983 (aged 89) Bromma, Sweden

Sport
- Sport: Fencing

Nils Grönvall (15 May 1894 – 13 July 1983) was a Swedish fencer. He competed in the individual foil event at the 1912 Summer Olympics.
