= Josef Čipera =

Bohemian fencer

Personal information
- Born: 12 January 1888 Rakovník, Austria-Hungary

Sport
- Country: Bohemia
- Sport: Fencing

Josef Čipera (born 12 January 1888, date of death unknown) was a Bohemian fencer. He competed for Bohemia in the team sabre event at the 1912 Summer Olympics.
