= Gustaf Armgarth =

Swedish fencer

Personal information
- Born: 1 February 1879 Tomelilla, Sweden
- Died: 3 March 1930 (aged 51) Malmö, Sweden

Sport
- Sport: Fencing

Gustaf Armgarth (1 February 1879 – 3 March 1930) was a Swedish fencer. He competed in the individual foil and sabre events at the 1912 Summer Olympics.
