= Frederic Schenck =

American fencer

Personal information
- Born: October 10, 1887 Pottsville, Pennsylvania, United States
- Died: February 28, 1919 (aged 31) Pine Grove, Pennsylvania, United States

Sport
- Sport: Fencing

Frederic Schenck (October 10, 1887 – February 28, 1919) was an American fencer. He competed in the individual épée event at the 1912 Summer Olympics. He graduated from Harvard University and University of Oxford.
