= Axel Jöhncke =

Swedish fencer

Personal information
- Born: 16 January 1878 Copenhagen, Denmark
- Died: 29 September 1953 (aged 75) Stockholm, Sweden

Sport
- Sport: Fencing

Axel Jöhncke (16 January 1878 – 29 September 1953) was a Swedish fencer. He competed in the individual foil and team sabre events at the 1912 Summer Olympics.
