= Adolf Davids =

German fencer

Personal information
- Born: 19 October 1867 Hanover, Kingdom of Prussia
- Died: 9 August 1963 (aged 95) Hanover, West Germany

Sport
- Sport: Fencing

Adolf Davids (19 October 1867 – 9 August 1963) was a German fencer. He competed in the individual foil event at the 1912 Summer Olympics.
