= Arthur Fagan (fencer) =

British fencer

Personal information
- Born: 10 December 1890 Chertsey, Surrey, England
- Died: 8 July 1977 (aged 86)

Sport
- Sport: Fencing

Arthur Fagan (10 December 1890 – 8 July 1977) was a British fencer. He competed in the individual foil event at the 1912 Summer Olympics.
