= Julius Thomson (fencer) =

German fencer (1888–1960)

Personal information
- Born: 14 June 1888 Offenbach am Main, German Empire
- Died: 16 July 1960 (aged 72) Offenbach am Main, West Germany

Sport
- Sport: Fencing

Julius Thomson (14 June 1888 – 16 July 1960) was a German fencer. He competed at the 1912 and 1928 Summer Olympics. He was the twin brother of Hans Thomson, who also competed for Germany at the Olympics in fencing.
