= Arthur Everitt =

British fencer (1872–1952)

Personal information
- Born: 27 August 1872 Paddington, London, England
- Died: 10 January 1952 (aged 79)

Sport
- Sport: Fencing
Medal record
Men's fencing
Representing United Kingdom
Olympic Games
Silver medal – second place	1912 Stockholm	Épée, team

Arthur Everitt (27 August 1872 – 10 January 1952) was a British fencer. He won a silver medal in the team épée event at the 1912 Summer Olympics.
