= Sigurd Mathiesen =

Norwegian fencer

Personal information
- Born: 30 August 1873 Horten, Norway
- Died: 4 January 1951 (aged 77) Billingstad, Norway

Sport
- Sport: Fencing

Sigurd Mathiesene (30 August 1873 – 4 January 1951) was a Norwegian fencer. He competed in the individual épée event at the 1912 Summer Olympics.
