= Jan de Beaufort =

Dutch fencer (1880–1946)

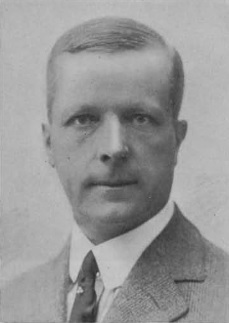

Personal information
- Born: 2 December 1880 Doorn, Netherlands
- Died: 2 April 1946 (aged 65) The Hague, Netherlands

Sport
- Sport: Fencing

Jan de Beaufort (2 December 1880 – 2 April 1946) was a Dutch fencer. He competed at three Olympic Games, in 1908 (London), 1912 (Stockholm) and 1924 (Paris).
