= Walther Meienreis =

German fencer

Personal information
- Born: 4 November 1877 Görlitz, German Empire
- Died: 2 December 1943 (aged 66) Berlin, Germany

Sport
- Sport: Fencing

Walther Meienreis (4 November 1877 – 2 December 1943) was a German fencer. He competed in the individual épée and team sabre events at the 1912 Summer Olympics.
