= Philippe Le Hardy de Beaulieu =

Belgian fencer

Personal information
- Born: 27 October 1887
- Died: 22 November 1942 (aged 55)

Sport
- Sport: Fencing
Medal record
Men's fencing
Representing Belgium
Intercalated Games
Bronze medal – third place	1906 Athens	Épée, Team
Olympic Games
Bronze medal – third place	1912 Stockholm	Épée, Individual

Philippe Le Hardy de Beaulieu (27 October 1887 – 22 November 1942) was a Belgian épée and sabre fencer. He won a bronze medal at the 1906 Intercalated Games and the 1912 Summer Olympics.
