= Jens Berthelsen =

Danish fencer (1890–1961)

Personal information
- Born: 17 December 1890 Copenhagen, Denmark
- Died: 28 October 1961 (aged 70) Copenhagen, Denmark

Sport
- Sport: Fencing

Jens Berthelsen (17 December 1890 – 28 October 1961) was a Danish fencer. He competed at three Olympic Games. His father, Jens Peter Berthelsen, was also an Olympic fencer.
