= Albertus Perk =

Dutch fencer (1887–1919)

Personal information
- Born: 16 September 1887 Anna Paulowna, Netherlands
- Died: 14 May 1919 (aged 31) Oldenburg, Germany

Sport
- Sport: Fencing

Albertus Perk (16 September 1887 – 14 May 1919) was a Dutch fencer. He competed in the individual épée event at the 1912 Summer Olympics. Perk, a Dutch Army and Air Force officer, was killed in 1919 when the Rumpler C.VIII he was a passenger of exploded in mid-air.
