= Walter Gates (fencer) =

South African fencer (1871–1939)

Personal information
- Born: 1 June 1871 Camberwell, London, England
- Died: 12 July 1939 (aged 68)

Sport
- Sport: Fencing

Walter Gates (1 June 1871 – 12 July 1939) was a South African épée, foil and sabre fencer. He competed at the 1908 and 1912 Summer Olympics.
