= Einar Sörensen =

Swedish fencer

Personal information
- Born: 26 July 1875 Stockholm, Sweden
- Died: 23 August 1941 (aged 66)

Sport
- Sport: Fencing

Einar Sörensen (26 July 1875 – 23 August 1941) was a Swedish fencer. He competed in the individual and team épée events at the 1912 Summer Olympics.
