= Oluf Berntsen =

Danish fencer

Personal information
- Born: 5 November 1891 Copenhagen, Denmark
- Died: 18 June 1987 (aged 95) France

Sport
- Sport: Fencing

Oluf Berntsen (5 November 1891 – 18 June 1987) was a Danish fencer. He competed in three events at the 1912 Summer Olympics.

He was the son of the Danish Prime Minister Klaus Berntsen. His brother, Aage Berntsen, also competed in fencing at the 1920 Summer Olympics.
