= Panagiotis Kambas =

Greek fencer

Personal information
- Born: 1891
- Died: Unknown

Sport
- Sport: Fencing

Panagiotis Kambas (Greek: Παναγιώτης Καμπάς, born 1891, date of death unknown) was a Greek fencer. He competed in the team épée event at the 1912 Summer Olympics.
