= Karel Goppold =

Bohemian fencer

Personal information
- Born: 15 December 1894 Prague, Austria-Hungary
- Died: 1956 (aged 61–62)

Sport
- Sport: Fencing

Karel Goppold (15 December 1894 – 1956) was a Bohemian fencer. He competed in the individual épée event at the 1912 Summer Olympics. Goppold committed suicide in 1956.
