= Heinrich Schrader (fencer) =

German fencer

Personal information
- Born: 1878
- Died: Unknown

Sport
- Sport: Fencing

Heinrich Schrader (born 1878, date of death unknown) was a German fencer. He competed in the individual épée event at the 1912 Summer Olympics.
