= Severin Finne =

Norwegian fencer

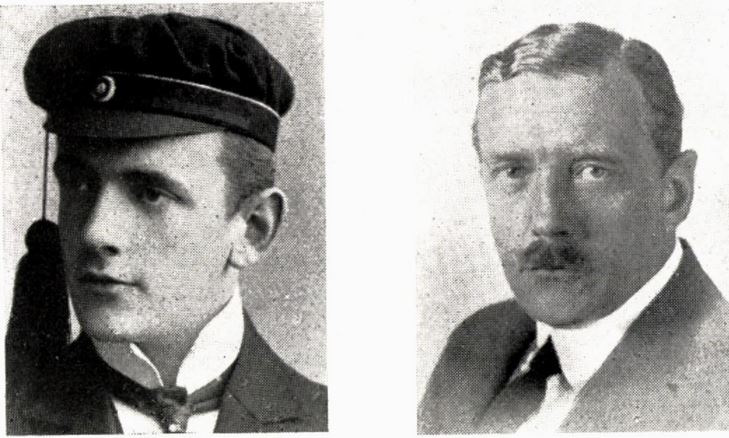

Personal information
- Born: 12 March 1883 Oslo, Norway
- Died: 24 March 1953 (aged 70) Oslo, Norway

Sport
- Sport: Fencing

Severin Finne (12 March 1883 – 24 March 1953) was a Norwegian fencer. He competed in the individual and team épée events at the 1912 Summer Olympics.
