= Dmitry Knyazhevich =

Russian fencer

Dmitry Maksimovich Knyazhevich
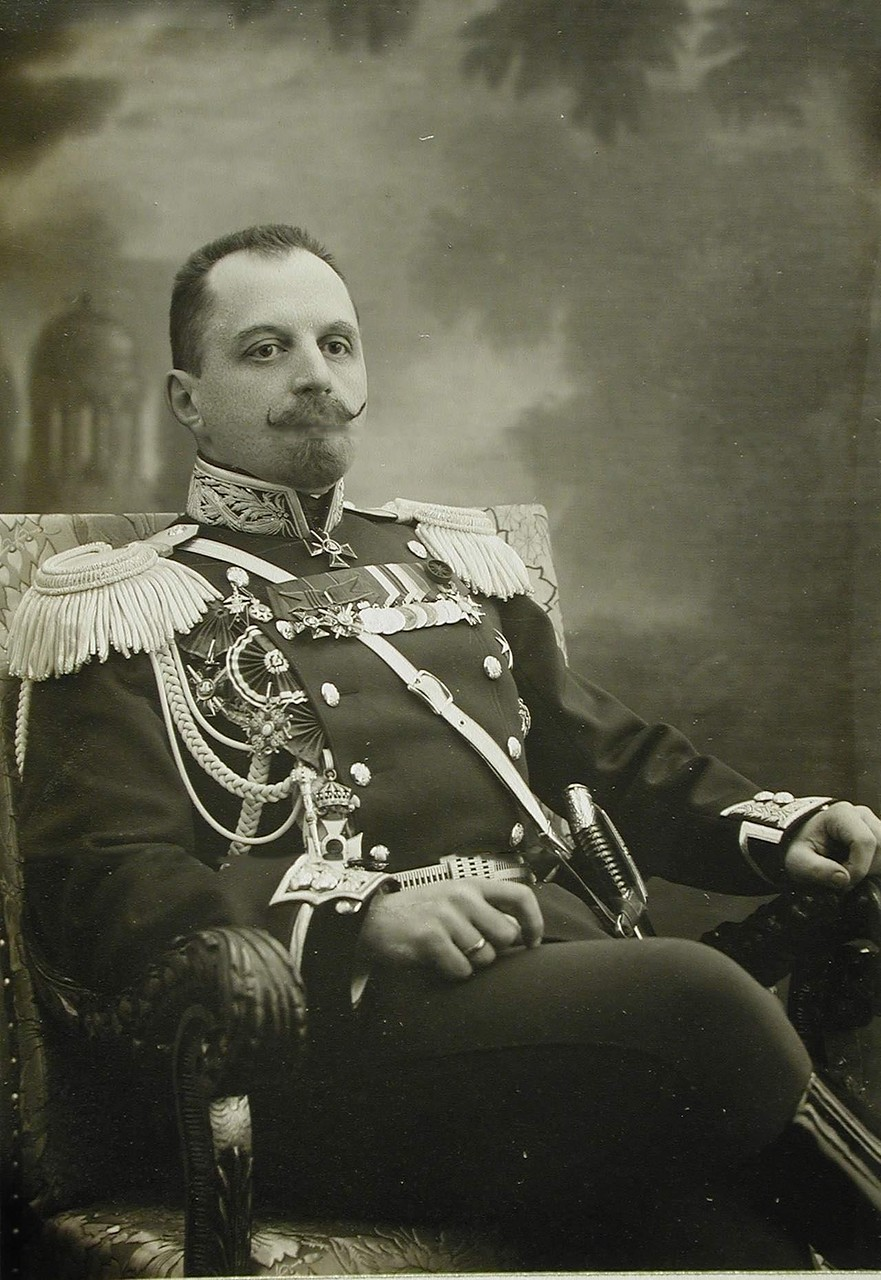
- Born: 21 June 1874
- Died: 1918 (aged 43–44) Soviet Russia
- Allegiance: Russian Empire; White Movement
- Branch: Army
- Service years: 1894–1918
- Rank: Major General
- Wars: Russo-Japanese War; World War I Russian Civil War
- Awards: Order of St. George; Order of St. Vladimir; Order of Saint Anna; Order of Saint Stanislaus

Dmitry Knyazhevich (Russian: Дмитрий Максимович Княжевич; 21 June 1874 – 1918) was an Imperial Russian soldier and Olympic fencer. He competed in the individual foil and team épée events at the 1912 Summer Olympics.

He served in the Russo-Japanese War and later in World War I, during which he was promoted to Major General. In 1918, during the Russian Civil War, he was killed in battle against the Bolsheviks.
