= Paul Anspach =

Belgian fencer

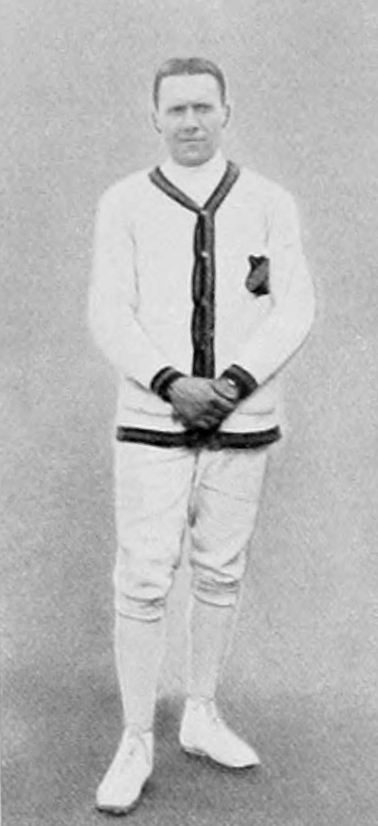
- Paul Anspach at the 1912 Olympics

Personal information
- Born: 1 April 1882 Brussels, Belgium
- Died: 28 August 1981 (aged 99) Brussels, Belgium
- Height: 1.80 m (5 ft 11 in)
- Weight: 73 kg (161 lb)

Sport
- Sport: Fencing
Medal record
Representing Belgium
Olympic Games
Gold medal – first place	1912 Stockholm	Individual epée
Gold medal – first place	1912 Stockholm	Team epée
Silver medal – second place	1920 Antwerp	Team epée
Silver medal – second place	1924 Paris	Team epée
Bronze medal – third place	1908 London	Team epée

Paul Eugène Albert Anspach (1 April 1882 – 28 August 1981) was a Belgian épée and foil fencer who competed in four consecutive Olympics (1908, 1912, 1920 and 1924).

His grand-uncle, Jules Anspach (1829-1879), was Brussels burgomaster.

== Early life ==
Paul Anspach began his athletic career as a football player. He was a member of the Anspach family. He died in his sleep in Brussels, Belgium on 28 August 1981.

== Fencing career ==
=== Olympics ===
Anspach was captain of the Belgian épée team from 1909 to 1928. At the 1908 Summer Olympics, he won a silver medal in the team épée event and placed 5th overall in individual épée. In the sabre competition, he was stopped in the 2nd round.

At the 1912 Summer Olympics, he captured gold medals in both the individual and team épée competitions. In the individual event, he won 6 of his 7 matches. He finished in 12th place in the individual foil event.

The Olympics were not held in 1916 because of World War I. At the 1920 Summer Olympics, Anspach won a silver medal in the team épée competition. In the 1924 Summer Olympics, he won a silver medal in team épée and finished 9th overall in individual épée.

In 1951, Anspach became the first recipient of the Taher Pacha Trophy (founded in 1950 by H.E. Mohammed Taher Pacha, a member of the IOC for Egypt. It is to be awarded annually by the IOC to an Athlete whose "general merit and career justify the award of a special distinction in the name of Olympism.")

In 1976, Anspach was awarded the Silver Medal of the Olympic Order. For the 1976 Summer Olympics in Montreal, the Comités d'organisation des Jeux Olympiques (COJO) invited Anspach to take part in the ceremony for the transmission of the Flame from Athens to Ottawa. His doctors felt that the journey from Brussels to Athens and back would be too tiring for the ninety-year-old Belgian, who said he was "honored and moved by this very special invitation".

=== Belgian Olympic Committee and International Fencing Association ===
He contributed to the formation of the Belgian Olympic Committee in 1906.

In 1913, he was one of the founders of the Fédération Internationale d'Escrime (International Fencing Association, or FIE). He served as its Secretary-General, before serving as its President from 1932 until 1939 (when it was suspended for the duration of World War II), and then from 1946 until 1950.

In 1914, he sat as Secretary at the Paris Olympic Congress, where he dealt with the technical side of the Congress. In 1914, along with the Marquess of Chasseloup-Laubat he drew up the rules for Fencing as an Olympic sport.

== See also ==
- List of Jewish Olympic medalists
