= Gordon Alexander =

British fencer (1885–1917)

Personal information
- Born: Q3, 1885 Kensington, London, England
- Died: 24 April 1917 (aged 31–32) Villers-Plouich, France

Sport
- Sport: Fencing

Gordon Reuben Alexander (1885 – 24 April 1917) was a British fencer. He competed in the individual foil and épée events at the 1912 Summer Olympics. He was killed in action during World War I.

== Death ==
While attacking the town of Villers-Plouich, a fellow soldier was wounded by a German artillery shell, and Alexander rushed to help him. While Alexander was dressing the soldier's wound, he was killed by another shell.

== Fencing career ==
In 1912, he competed in the individual foil and épée events at the 1912 Summer Olympics. the following year in 1913, he won the foil title at the British Fencing Championships.

== See also ==
- List of Olympians killed in World War I
