= Zdeněk Bárta =

Czech fencer (1891–1987)

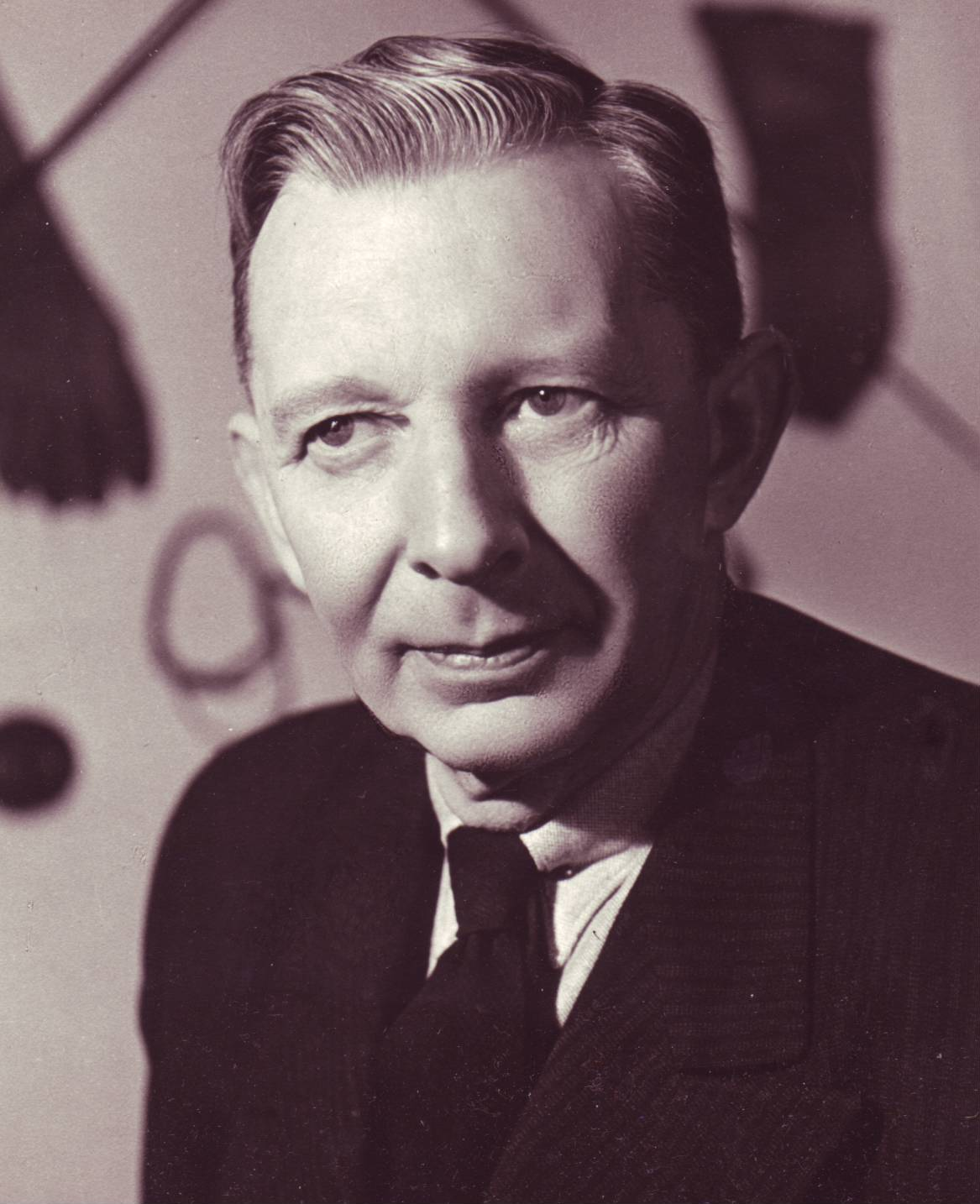

Personal information
- Born: 15 May 1891 Křenična, Bohemia, Austria-Hungary
- Died: 1 April 1987 (aged 95)

Sport
- Sport: Fencing

Zdeněk Bárta (15 May 1891 – 1 April 1987) was a Bohemian fencer. He competed in the individual épée and sabre events at the 1912 Summer Olympics.
