= Heinrich Ziegler =

German fencer (1891–1918)

Personal information
- Born: 31 August 1891 Kannstatt, German Empire
- Died: 3 December 1918 (aged 27) Frankfurt, Germany

Sport
- Sport: Fencing

Heinrich Ziegler (31 August 1891 – 3 December 1918) was a German fencer. He competed in the individual foil and team épée events at the 1912 Summer Olympics. He was killed in action during World War I.

== See also ==
- List of Olympians killed in World War I
