= Jacob van Geuns =

Dutch fencer (1872–1952)

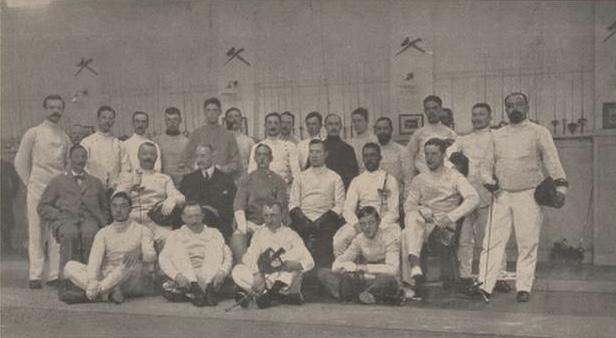
- Van Geuns in 1912

Personal information
- Born: 15 November 1872; Utrecht, Netherlands
- Died: 12 November 1952 (aged 79); Apeldoorn, Netherlands

Sport
- Sport: Fencing

Jacob van Geuns (15 November 1872 – 12 November 1952) was a Dutch fencer. He competed in the individual épée event at the 1912 Summer Olympics.
