= George Breed =

American fencer

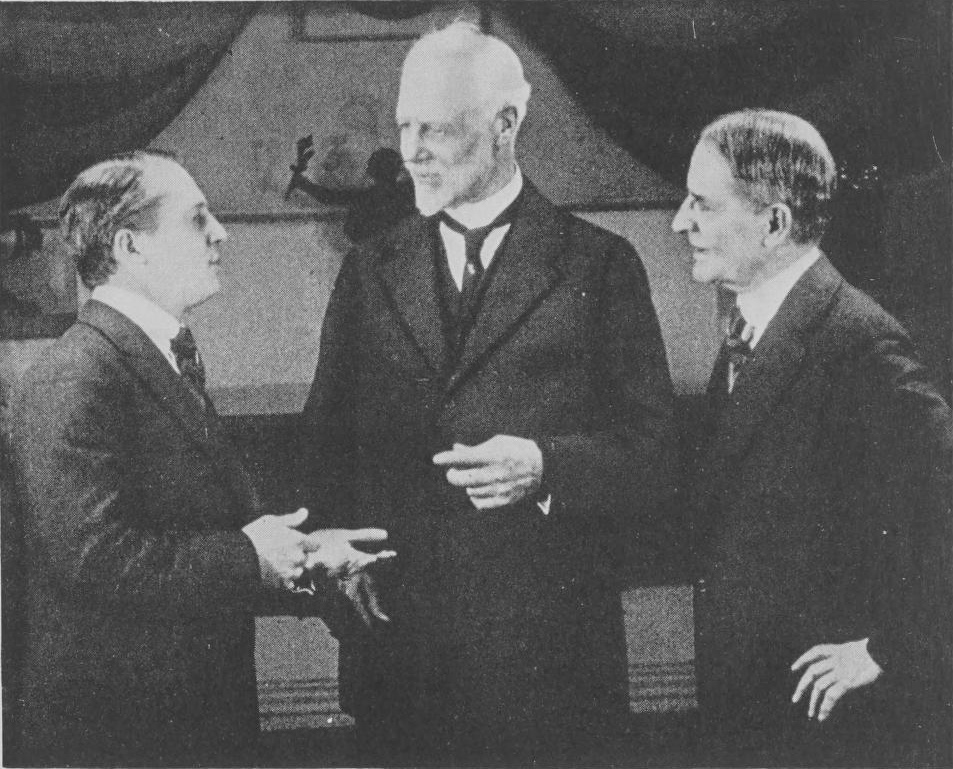
- Breed (left) with Graeme Hammond and W. Scott O'Connor

Personal information
- Born: July 14, 1876 Louisville, Kentucky, United States
- Died: June 24, 1956 (aged 79) New York, New York, United States

Sport
- Sport: Fencing
- College team: Harvard University

George Breed (July 14, 1876 – June 24, 1956) was an American fencer. He competed at the 1912 and 1924 Summer Olympics. Breed won multiple national titles in the 1910s and 1920s, and was inducted into the USA Fencing Hall of Fame in 2018.

== See also ==
- List of USFA Hall of Fame members
