= Wilhelm Löffler (fencer) =

German fencer (born 1886)

Personal information
- Born: 7 February 1886

Sport
- Sport: Fencing

Wilhelm Löffler (born 7 February 1886) was a German fencer. He competed at the 1912 and 1928 Summer Olympics.
