= Marc Larimer =

American fencer

Personal information
- Born: December 28, 1890 Wichita, Kansas, United States
- Died: February 6, 1919 (aged 28)

Sport
- Sport: Fencing

Marc Larimer (December 28, 1890 – February 6, 1919) was an American fencer and an officer in the US Navy. He competed in the individual foil and épée events at the 1912 Summer Olympics.
