= Alfred Sauer =

American fencer

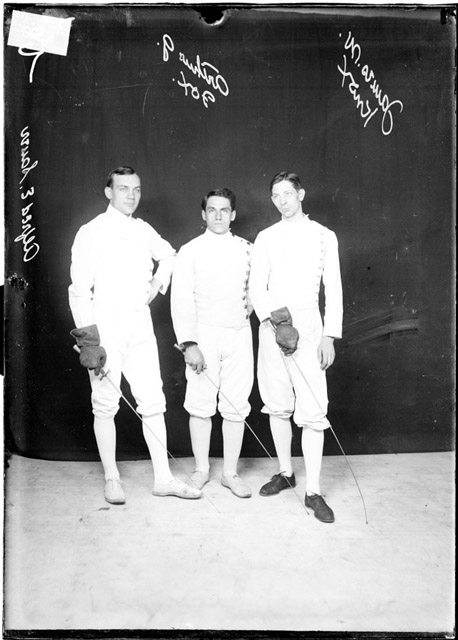
- Fencers Alfred E. Sauer (left), Arthur G. Fox (middle) and James W. Knox (right).

Personal information
- Nationality: American
- Born: July 31, 1880 Würzburg, Germany
- Died: November 11, 1943 (aged 63) Magnolia Springs, Alabama, U.S.

Sport
- Sport: Fencing

Alfred Sauer (July 31, 1880 – November 11, 1943) was an American fencer. US Fencing Hall of Famer Sauer was the US national champion in foil in 1916. He was the US national champion in Épée in 1913. He was also a member of the 1912 US Olympic fencing team. He competed in three events at the 1912 Summer Olympics.

== See also ==
- List of USFA Hall of Fame members
