= Josef Javůrek =

Czech fencer

Personal information
- Born: 19 May 1876 Eger, Austria-Hungary
- Died: 20 October 1942 (aged 66)
- Height: 165 cm (5 ft 5 in)

Sport
- Sport: Fencing

Josef Jan Nepomuk Javůrek (19 May 1876 – 20 October 1942) was a fencer for Bohemia and later for Czechoslovakia. He competed at three Olympic Games.
