= John MacLaughlin (fencer) =

American fencer

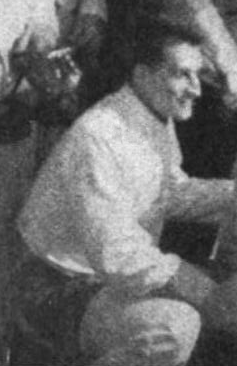
- At the 1912 Summer Olympics

Personal information
- Full name: John Andrews MacLaughlin
- Born: April 20, 1890 Rahway, New Jersey, U.S.
- Died: March 18, 1961 (aged 70) Harford County, Maryland, U.S.

Sport
- Sport: Fencing
- College team: Harvard University

John MacLaughlin (April 20, 1890 – March 18, 1961) was an American épée and foil fencer. He competed in three events at the 1912 Summer Olympics.
