= Lev Martyushev =

Russian fencer

Personal information
- Born: 19 November 1880
- Died: 20 December 1937 (aged 57)

Sport
- Sport: Fencing

Lev Martyushev (Russian: Лев Мартюшев, 19 November 1880 – 20 December 1937) was a Russian fencer. He competed in three events at the 1912 Summer Olympics.

He was arrested by the NKVD on November 4, 1937; On December 11, 1937, a commission of the NKVD and the Prosecutor's Office of the USSR found Martyushev guilty on three counts of statutes under Article 58 of the Criminal Code of the RSFSR. Specifically, he was found guilty of espionage, preparation, and conduct of a terrorist act. He was sentenced to death;, and was shot in Leningrad on December 20, 1937.
