= Lars Aas =

Norwegian fencer (1879–1964)

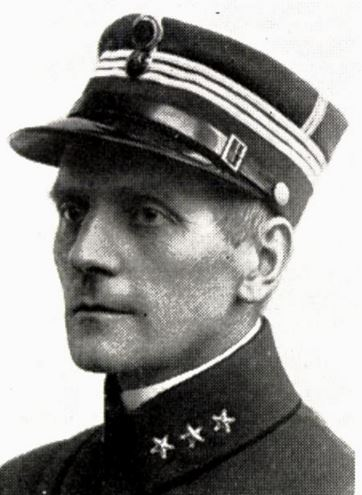

Personal information
- Born: 26 February 1879 Oslo, Norway
- Died: 24 February 1964 (aged 84) Oslo, Norway

Sport
- Sport: Fencing

Lars Thorlaksøn Aas (26 February 1879 – 24 February 1964) was a Norwegian épée and foil fencer. He competed in three events at the 1912 Summer Olympics.
