= Hans Olsen (fencer) =

Danish fencer

Personal information
- Born: 21 January 1886 Slagelse, Denmark
- Died: 13 September 1976 (aged 90) Hvidovre, Denmark

Sport
- Sport: Fencing

Hans Olsen (21 January 1886 – 13 September 1976) was a Danish fencer. He competed in four events at the 1912 Summer Olympics.
