= Graeme Hammond =

American sportsperson

Personal information
- National team: United States
- Born: Graeme Monroe Hammond; February 1, 1858 Philadelphia, Pennsylvania, United States
- Died: October 30, 1944 (aged 86) New York City, U.S.
- Spouse: Louise Elsworth
- Children: 4

Sport
- Sport: Fencing

Graeme Monroe Hammond (February 1, 1858 – October 30, 1944) was an American neurologist and sportsman who advocated for physical exercise as treatment for nervous disorders. He served as an officer of the American Neurological Association for twenty years. Hammond was a competitive fencer who competed in the 1912 Olympics, helped found the Amateur Fencers League of America and served as president emeritus of the American Olympic Association.

== Early life and education ==
Graeme Monroe Hammond was born on February 1, 1858, in Philadelphia, Pennsylvania, the son of neurologist and Surgeon General of the United States Army Brigadier General William Alexander Hammond. The Hammond family lived in Washington, D.C., during the American Civil War. Graeme Hammond later recalled his regular trips as a young boy, accompanying Abraham Lincoln to visit wounded soldiers during the war. "I shall never forget the sweetness of the man nor the understandings which he showed in dealings with a little boy... we were play fellows and even the soldiers who accompanied us, I felt, were doing so as much for me as they were for the man who would take me in his great hands and set me beside himself in the carriage."

Following the close of the Civil War, the family moved to New York City. He fenced for the Columbia Lions fencing team. Hammond graduated from the Columbia School of Mines in 1877. He then earned a Doctor of Medicine degree from New York University School of Medicine in 1881. On April 27 of the same year, Hammond married Louise Elsworth with whom he had four daughters during the 1880s. While teaching at NYU, Hammond continued his education, earning a Bachelor of Laws in 1897.

== Medical career ==
During his entire professional career, Hammond was a professor of nervous and mental diseases at NYU School of Medicine, serving as the chair in neurology from 1898 to 1920. He became a fellow of the American Psychiatric Association in 1908. He was an officer of the American Neurological Association for more than 20 years, serving as its president from 1911 to 1912. He was also the Treasurer of the New York Neurological Society for thirty years.

During World War I, Hammond was commissioned as a Major in the Medical Reserve Corps of the United States Army and stationed at Camp Mills and Camp Upton. As a medical examiner, Hammond determined the mental qualifications of 78,000 individual volunteers and conscripts. He became an expert on the treatment of soldiers traumatized by "shell-shock."

=== Advocacy of exercise ===
Hammond was a lifelong advocate of regular physical exercise as a prevention and cure for most diseases, including nervous and mental disorders. According to his colleague, Hammond believed in the "principle of a healthy body making a sound mind."

Hammond suggested riding a bicycle as a treatment for nervous disorders, in which he included homosexuality. According to the Harvard Gay & Lesbian Review, Hammond thought that homosexuality was caused by "nervous exhaustion and that bicycle exercise would restore health and heterosexuality."

Hammond supported the enlistment of women as combat soldiers during World War I. He believed that women would make better soldiers than men and that he would prefer to see mixed regiments of men and women. "If women could acquire the physical strength and could be disciplined -- (make a note of that) AND COULD BE DISCIPLINED -- they would dominate the earth." Hammond believed that women were "the real fighting sex" but that the American society "mollycoddled" women and promoted overindulgent lifestyles in regard to diet and exercise. "If women were forced to enjoy the rigorous training entailed by life in a fighting army, this overindulgence would of course be summarily stopped. And at the same time they could be getting regular, outdoor exercise. Nothing could be better for them as individuals and as mothers."

== Sports ==
Hammond was a competitive fencer who, in 1891, helped found and was the first president of the Amateur Fencers League of America. He won multiple championships in fencing and was the United States champion for foil (1891), épée (1889, 1891, 1893) and sabre (1893, 1894). At the age of 54, Hammond competed in the individual foil and épée events at the 1912 Summer Olympics. He was eliminated in the first round of both events, placing fourth in each qualifying pool. Hammond later served as president of the New York Athletic Club and was the president emeritus of the American Olympic Association from 1930 to 1932.

Hammond was a roll of honor inductee into the United States Fencing Hall of Fame where he is "generally regarded as the father of American fencing."

== Later life and death ==
Hammond, who both smoked and drank daily, advocated consistent and proper exercise as the key to good health. He continued a daily regimen of running into his 80s and on his birthdays ran four miles on a track "just to prove to myself that I am not getting old. And I plan to keep it up as long as I live, which probably won't be much over 110." At the age of 86, Hammond slipped into a coma and died two weeks later, on October 30, 1944. He was survived by two of his four daughters.
