= Zdeněk Vávra =

Czech fencer

Personal information
- Born: 25 September 1891 Prague
- Died: 18 September 1947 (aged 55) Prague, Czechoslovakia

Sport
- Sport: Fencing

Zdeněk Josef Jan Vávra (25 September 1891 – 18 September 1947) was an Olympic épée, foil and sabre fencer who competed for Bohemia in 1912 and Czechoslovakia in 1920.
