= Georgios Petropoulos =

Greek fencer (1872–1937)

Personal information
- Born: 23 May 1872 Dytiki Ellada, Greece
- Died: 1937 (aged 64–65)

Sport
- Sport: Fencing

Georgios Petropoulos (Greek: Γεώργιος Πετρόπουλος, 23 May 1872 – 1937) was a Greek fencer and shooter. He competed at the 1906 and 1912 Summer Olympics.
