= Hermann Plaskuda =

German fencer

Personal information
- Born: 6 April 1879
- Died: 21 March 1918 (aged 38) France

Sport
- Sport: Fencing

Hermann Plaskuda (6 April 1879 – 21 March 1918) was a German fencer. He competed in four events at the 1912 Summer Olympics. He was killed in action during World War I.

== See also ==
- List of Olympians killed in World War I
