= Georges von Tangen =

Norwegian fencer

Personal information
- Full name: Christopher Georges Johan von Tangen
- Born: 29 June 1877 Paris, France
- Died: 22 December 1941 (aged 64) Oslo, Norway

Sport
- Sport: Fencing

Christopher Georges Johan von Tangen (29 June 1877 – 22 December 1941) was a Norwegian épée and foil fencer. He competed in three events at the 1912 Summer Olympics.
