= Gavriil Bertrain =

Russian fencer

Personal information
- Born: 2 August 1869
- Died: 25 October 1939 (aged 70)

Sport
- Sport: Fencing

Gavriil (Gabriel) Bertrain (Bertren) (Russian: Гавриил Бертрен, 2 August 1869 – 25 October 1939) was a French and Russian military officer and Russian fencer. He competed in three events at the 1912 Summer Olympics.
