= Ejnar Levison =

Danish fencer (1880–1970)

Personal information
- Nationality: Danish
- Born: 15 May 1880 Copenhagen, Denmark
- Died: 3 August 1970 (aged 90) Monaco

Sport
- Sport: Fencing
- Team: Fægteklubben af 1907

Ejnar Herman Levison (15 May 1880 – 3 August 1970) was a Danish fencer. He competed at four Olympic Games.
