= Georgios Versis =

Greek fencer

Personal information
- Born: 1894
- Died: Unknown

Sport
- Sport: Fencing

Georgios Versis (Greek: Γεώργιος Βερσής, born 1894, date of death unknown) was a Greek fencer. He competed in the individual and team épée events at the 1912 Summer Olympics.
