= Miloš Klika =

Czech fencer (1890–1962)

Personal information
- Born: 3 April 1890
- Died: 21 August 1962 (aged 72)

Sport
- Sport: Fencing

Miloš Klika (3 April 1890 – 21 August 1962) was a Bohemian fencer. He competed in the individual épée and sabre events at the 1912 Summer Olympics. He was also involved with the Czechoslovak resistance during World War II. Most notably, he supplied the poison for the poisoning of collaborator journalist Karel Lanžovský. He also planned an assassination on Karl Hermann Frank.
