= Sydney Martineau =

British fencer (1863–1945)

Personal information
- Born: 6 January 1863 Clapham, London, England
- Died: 19 December 1945 (aged 82) Westminster, London, England

Sport
- Sport: Fencing
Medal record
Men's fencing
Representing United Kingdom
Olympic Games
Silver medal – second place	1912 Stockholm	Épée, team

Sydney Martineau (6 January 1863 – 19 December 1945) was a British fencer who took part in the 1912 Olympics in Stockholm, and the Fencing at the 1908 Summer Olympics – Men's épée.

== Early life and family ==
Martineau was the son of David Martineau (1828–1911) and Sarah Emma Scott (1833–1924), daughter of Robert Wellbeloved Scott. He was educated at Marlborough College as were his brothers Howard Martineau (1864–1953) and distinguished engineer Louis Martineau (1866–1895). Sydney's son, Frederick Alan Martineau MBE (1904–1990), father of Baroness Vivian (née Carol Martineau) (1939–2013), also boarded at Marlborough. Sydney married Mary Edith, daughter of Frederick Nettlefold. His brother Howard married Mary's sister Dorothy Nettlefold.

As Unitarians, Sydney's father, David Martineau, made donations in 1893 to Manchester College, Oxford University (now Harris Manchester College) as did his third cousin Francis Martineau Lupton (1848–1921) and relatives Sir Thomas and Lady Martineau. Family member the Rev. James Martineau (1805–1900) was vice-president of the college at this time. Francis Martineau Lupton's daughter Olive Middleton (1881–1936) boarded at Roedean around the same time as Sidney's spinster sisters, artists Lucy Martineau (1869–1952) and Sarah Madeleine Martineau (1872–1972).

== Career ==
Martineau won an Olympic silver medal in fencing at the 1912 Olympics in Stockholm. He was part of the British team which came in second place, behind Belgium, in the team epee competition.
