= Josef Pfeiffer =

Bohemian fencer

Personal information
- Born: 1884
- Died: Unknown

Sport
- Sport: Fencing

Josef Pfeiffer (born 1884, date of death unknown) was a Bohemian épée, foil and sabre fencer. He competed in four events at the 1912 Summer Olympics.
