= František Kříž =

Fencer

Personal information
- Born: 18 May 1884 Prague, Austria-Hungary
- Died: 30 July 1966 (aged 82)

Sport
- Sport: Fencing

František Kříž (18 May 1884 – 30 July 1966) was a fencer who competed for Bohemia in 1912 and Czechoslovakia in 1928.
