= Vilém Goppold Jr. =

Bohemian fencer

Personal information
- Born: 15 August 1893 Prague, Austria-Hungary
- Died: 7 July 1945 (aged 51) Terezín, Czechoslovakia

Sport
- Sport: Fencing

Vilém Alois Maria August Goppold Jr. (15 August 1893 – 7 July 1945) was a Bohemian épée, foil and sabre fencer. He competed in three events at the 1912 Summer Olympics.
