= Sotirios Notaris (fencer) =

Greek fencer

Personal information
- Born: 1879
- Died: 1924 (aged 44–45)

Sport
- Sport: Fencing

Sotirios Notaris (Greek: Σωτήριος Νοτάρης, 1879 – 1924) was a Greek fencer. He competed in three events at the 1912 Summer Olympics.
