= Fencing at the 1912 Summer Olympics – Men's sabre =

Fencing at the Olympics

Men's sabre at the Games of the V Olympiad
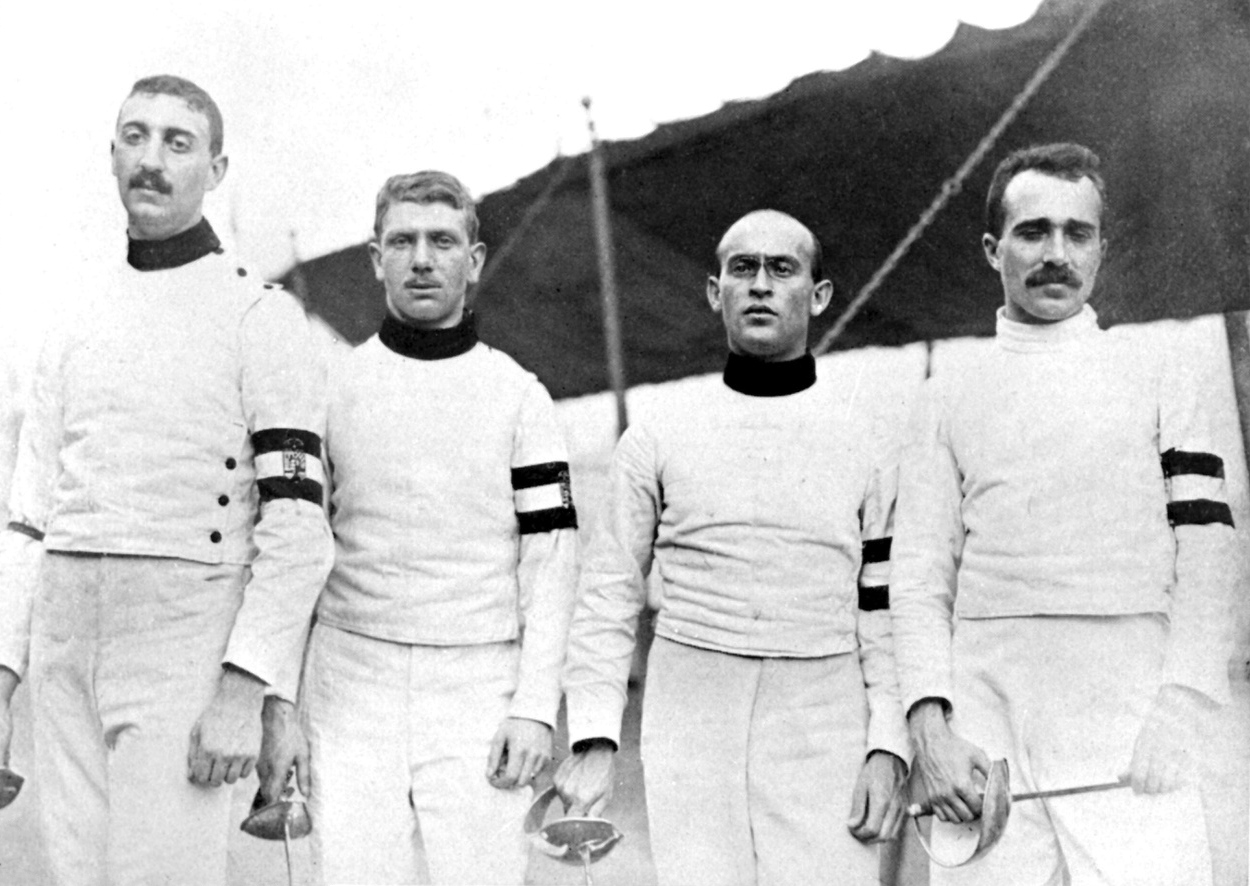
- Hungarian fencers Lajos Werkner, Oszkar Gerde, Jenö Fuchs, and Péter Tóth (1908)
- Venue: Östermalm Athletic Grounds
- Dates: July 16–18, 1912
- Competitors: 64 from 12 nations

Medalists
1st place, gold medalist(s)		Jenő Fuchs	Hungary
2nd place, silver medalist(s)		Béla Békessy	Hungary
3rd place, bronze medalist(s)		Ervin Mészáros	Hungary

The men's sabre was a fencing event held as part of the Fencing at the 1912 Summer Olympics programme in Stockholm, Sweden. It was the fifth appearance of the event.

The Hungarian fencers dominated the competition, with all 12 advancing to the semifinals. In 2 of the 4 semifinals, the Hungarians took the top three places. In a third, Hungarian fencers took the two qualifying spots while the third Hungarian did not start. In the remaining semifinal, Nedo Nadi of Italy placed second to become the only non-Hungarian fencer to advance to the final (the three Hungarians took first, third, and fourth in that semifinal).

The final consisted of 7 Hungarian fencers and Nadi. Nadi took fifth. Jenő Fuchs successfully defended his 1908 Olympic title, the first man to win multiple medals in the sabre. Béla Békessy took silver and Ervin Mészáros earned bronze.

== Background ==
This was the fifth appearance of the event, which is the only fencing event to have been held at every Summer Olympics. Four of the eight finalists from 1908 returned: gold medalist Jenő Fuchs, silver medalist Béla Zulawszky, fifth-place finisher Péter Tóth, and sixth-place finisher Lajos Werkner, all of Hungary. Hungary was dominant in the sabre; Fuchs' 1908 victory started a run that lasted through 1964 in which the only Games that Hungary did not win the event was the one to which the nation was not invited (1920).

Russia and Sweden each made their debut in the men's sabre. Austria made its fourth appearance in the event, most of any nation, having missed only the 1904 Games in St. Louis.

== Competition format ==
The competition was held over four rounds. In each round, each pool held a round-robin. European sabre rules at the time used a larger target area than the post-World War I standard. In 1896, 1900, and 1908, the target area had been the whole body; the 1912 rules reduced that to "all body parts, located above the horizontal line passing through the crotch". (The 1904 competition used the American rules which became the standard now used.) Double hits were possible under the rules of the time.

- First round: 16 pools of between 3 and 5 fencers each. The top 3 fencers in each pool advanced to the quarterfinals.
- Quarterfinals: 8 pools of 6 fencers each (before withdrawals). The top 3 fencers in each pool advanced to the semifinals.
- Semifinals: 4 pools of 6 fencers each. The top 2 fencers in each pool advanced to the final.
- Final: 1 pool of 8 fencers.

== Schedule ==
Date	Time	Round
Tuesday, 16 July 1912	9:00; 12:00; 15:00	Round 1 pools A–D; Round 1 pools E–H; Round 1 pools I–L
Wednesday, 17 July 1912	9:00; 12:00; 15:00	Round 1 pools M–P; Quarterfinals pools A–D; Quarterfinals pools E–H
Thursday, 18 July 1912	9:00; 14:00	Semifinals; Final

== Results ==
=== Round 1 ===
==== Pool A ====
Rank	Fencer	Nation	Wins	Notes
1	Giovanni Benfratello	Italy	3	Q
2	Lajos Werkner	Hungary	2	Q
3	Vladimir Danich	Russian Empire	1	Q
4	Gustaf Armgarth	Sweden	0	

==== Pool B ====
Rank	Fencer	Nation	Wins	Notes
1	Julius Lichtenfels	Germany	3	Q
1	Béla Zulavsky	Hungary	3	Q
3	Vladimir Andreyev	Russian Empire	2	Q
4	Friedrich Golling	Austria	2	
5	Helge Werner	Sweden	0	

==== Pool C ====
Rank	Fencer	Nation	Wins	Notes
1	Karl Münich	Austria	3	Q
2	Hans Thomson	Germany	2	Q
3	Jens Berthelsen	Denmark	1	Q
4	Boris Nepokupnoy	Russian Empire	0	

==== Pool D ====
Rank	Fencer	Nation	Wins	Notes
1	Edoardo Alaimo	Italy	4	Q
2	Oluf Berntsen	Denmark	2	Q
2	Albert Bogen	Austria	2	Q
4	Zdeněk Bárta	Bohemia	1	
4	Aleksandr Shkylev	Russian Empire	1	

==== Pool E ====
Rank	Fencer	Nation	Wins	Notes
1	Charles Vanderbyl	Great Britain	3	Q
2	Josef Javůrek	Bohemia	3	Q
3	Josef Puhm	Austria	2	Q
4	Carl-Gustaf Klerck	Sweden	1	
4	Georgy Zakyrich	Russian Empire	1	

==== Pool F ====
Rank	Fencer	Nation	Wins	Notes
1	Einar Levison	Denmark	3	Q
2	Alfred Martin	Great Britain	2	Q
3	Anatoly Timofeyev	Russian Empire	1	Q
4	Johannes Kolling	Netherlands	0	

==== Pool G ====
Rank	Fencer	Nation	Wins	Notes
1	Béla Békessy	Hungary	3	Q
2	Franz Dereani	Austria	1	Q
3	William Marsh	Great Britain	1	Q
4	Konstantin Vaterkampf	Russian Empire	1	

==== Pool H ====
Rank	Fencer	Nation	Wins	Notes
1	Hendrik de Iongh	Netherlands	3	Q
1	Péter Tóth	Hungary	3	Q
3	Sven Nordenström	Sweden	2	Q
4	Douglas Godfree	Great Britain	1	
4	Aleksandr Mordovin	Russian Empire	1	

==== Pool I ====
Rank	Fencer	Nation	Wins	Notes
1	Nikolay Kuznetsov	Russian Empire	—	Q
1	Ervin Mészáros	Hungary	—	Q
1	Georg Stöhr	Germany	—	Q

==== Pool J ====
Rank	Fencer	Nation	Wins	Notes
1	Jenő Fuchs	Hungary	—	Q
1	Apollon Guiber von Greifenfels	Russian Empire	—	Q
1	Carl Personne	Sweden	—	Q

==== Poolol K ====
Rank	Fencer	Nation	Wins	Notes
1	Boris Arsenyev	Russian Empire	—	Q
1	Bertalan Dunay	Hungary	—	Q
1	Ernest zu Hohenlohe	Austria	—	Q

==== Pool L ====
Rank	Fencer	Nation	Wins	Notes
1	Zoltán Schenker	Hungary	3	Q
2	Friedrich Schwarz	Germany	2	Q
3	Harry Butterworth	Great Britain	1	Q
4	Pavel Filatov	Russian Empire	1	

==== Pool M ====
Rank	Fencer	Nation	Wins	Notes
1	Francesco Pietrasanta	Italy	3	Q
2	Pál Pajzs	Hungary	1	Q
3	Alfred Syson	Great Britain	1	Q
4	Walter Gate	South Africa	1	

==== Pool N ====
Rank	Fencer	Nation	Wins	Notes
1	Oszkár Gerde	Hungary	3	Q
2	Nedo Nadi	Italy	2	Q
3	Albertson van zo Post	United States	1	Q
4	Archibald Corble	Great Britain	0	

==== Pool O ====
Rank	Fencer	Nation	Wins	Notes
1	Dezső Földes	Hungary	—	Q
1	Alfred Keene	Great Britain	—	Q
1	Alfred Sauer	United States	—	Q

==== Pool P ====
Rank	Fencer	Nation	Wins	Notes
1	László Berti	Hungary	3	Q
2	Aristide Pontanani	Italy	2	Q
3	Edward Brookfield	Great Britain	1	Q
4	Gunnar Lindholm	Sweden	0	

=== Quarterfinals ===
==== Quarterfinal A ====
Rank	Fencer	Nation	Losses	Notes
1	László Berti	Hungary	0	Q
2	Bertalan Dunay	Hungary	1	Q
3	Vladimir Andreyev	Russian Empire	2	Q
4	Giovanni Benfratello	Italy	3	
5	Einar Levison	Denmark	4	
5	Georg Stöhr	Germany	4	

==== Quarterfinal B ====
Rank	Fencer	Nation	Losses	Notes
1	Lajos Werkner	Hungary	0	Q
2	Oszkár Gerde	Hungary	1	Q
3	Anatoly Timofeyev	Russian Empire	2	Q
4	Harry Butterworth	Great Britain	3	
4	Alfred Sauer	United States	3	
—	Albert Bogen	Austria	DNS	

==== Quarterfinal C ====
Rank	Fencer	Nation	Losses	Notes
1	Ervin Mészáros	Hungary	0	Q
2	Friedrich Schwarz	Germany	1	Q
3	William Marsh	Great Britain	2	Q
4	Ernest zu Hohenlohe	Austria	3	
—	Edoardo Alaimo	Italy	DNS	
—	Vladimir Danich	Russian Empire	DNS	

==== Quarterfinal D ====
Rank	Fencer	Nation	Losses	Notes
1	Béla Békessy	Hungary	1	Q
1	Dezső Földes	Hungary	1	Q
3	Oluf Berntsen	Denmark	2	Q
4	Nikolay Kuznetsov	Russian Empire	3	
4	Aristide Pontenani	Italy	3	
—	Karl Münich	Austria	DNS	

==== Quarterfinal E ====
Rank	Fencer	Nation	Losses	Notes
1	Zoltán Schenker	Hungary	1	Q
2	Apollon Guiber von Greifenfels	Russian Empire	2	Q
2	Charles Vanderbyl	Great Britain	2	Q
4	Hans Thomson	Germany	2	
5	Edward Brookfield	Great Britain	3	
—	Franz Dereani	Austria	DNS	

==== Quarterfinal F ====
Rank	Fencer	Nation	Losses	Notes
1	Jenő Fuchs	Hungary	0	Q
1	Alfred Syson	Great Britain	0	Q
3	Boris Arsenyev	Russian Empire	2	Q
4	Jens Berthelsen	Denmark	3	
—	Hendrik de Iongh	Netherlands	DNS	
—	Josef Javůrek	Bohemia	DNS	

==== Quarterfinal G ====
Rank	Fencer	Nation	Losses	Notes
1	Nedo Nadi	Italy	1	Q
1	Pál Pajzs	Hungary	1	Q
3	Béla Zulavsky	Hungary	2	Q
4	Alfred Keene	Great Britain	2	
5	Sven Nordenström	Sweden	4	
—	Josef Puhm	Austria	DNS	

==== Quarterfinal H ====
Rank	Fencer	Nation	Losses	Notes
1	Péter Tóth	Hungary	0	Q
2	Julius Lichtenels	Germany	1	Q
2	Carl Personne	Sweden	1	Q
4	Francesco Pietrasanta	Italy	1	
5	Alfred Martin	Great Britain	4	
—	Albertson van zo Post	United States	DNS	

=== Semifinals ===
==== Semifinal A ====
Rank	Fencer	Nation	Wins	Notes
1	Béla Békessy	Hungary	4	Q
2	Nedo Nadi	Italy	3	Q
3	Béla Zulavsky	Hungary	2	
4	Bertalan Dunay	Hungary	1	
5	Friedrich Schwarz	Germany	0	
—	Anatoly Timofeyev	Russian Empire	DNS	

==== Semifinal B ====
Rank	Fencer	Nation	Wins	Notes
1	Péter Tóth	Hungary	2	Q
2	Jenő Fuchs	Hungary	1	Q
3	Alfred Syson	Great Britain	0	
—	Vladimir Andreyev	Russian Empire	DNS	
—	Oszkár Gerde	Hungary	DNS	
—	Julius Lichtenfels	Germany	DNS	

==== Semifinal C ====
Rank	Fencer	Nation	Wins	Notes
1	Ervin Mészáros	Hungary	5	Q
2	Dezső Földes	Hungary	4	Q
3	Pál Pajzs	Hungary	3	
4	Charles Vanderbyl	Great Britain	2	
5	Boris Arsenyev	Russian Empire	1	
6	Carl Personne	Sweden	0	

==== Semifinal D ====
Rank	Fencer	Nation	Wins	Notes
1	Lajos Werkner	Hungary	5	Q
2	Zoltán Schenker	Hungary	4	Q
3	László Berti	Hungary	3	
4	Apollon Guiber von Greifenfels	Russian Empire	2	
5	William Marsh	Great Britain	1	
6	Oluf Berntsen	Denmark	0	

=== Final ===
Rank	Fencer	Nation	Wins	Losses	TF	TA
1st place, gold medalist(s)	Jenő Fuchs	Hungary	6	1	18	10
2nd place, silver medalist(s)	Béla Békessy	Hungary	5	2	17	11
3rd place, bronze medalist(s)	Ervin Mészáros	Hungary	5	2	17	12
4	Zoltán Schenker	Hungary	4	3	17	13
5	Nedo Nadi	Italy	4	3	16	17
6	Péter Tóth	Hungary	2	5	12	17
7	Lajos Werkner	Hungary	1	6	13	19
8	Dezső Földes	Hungary	1	6	9	20
