= Fencing at the 1912 Summer Olympics – Men's team sabre =

Men's team sabre at the Games of the V Olympiad
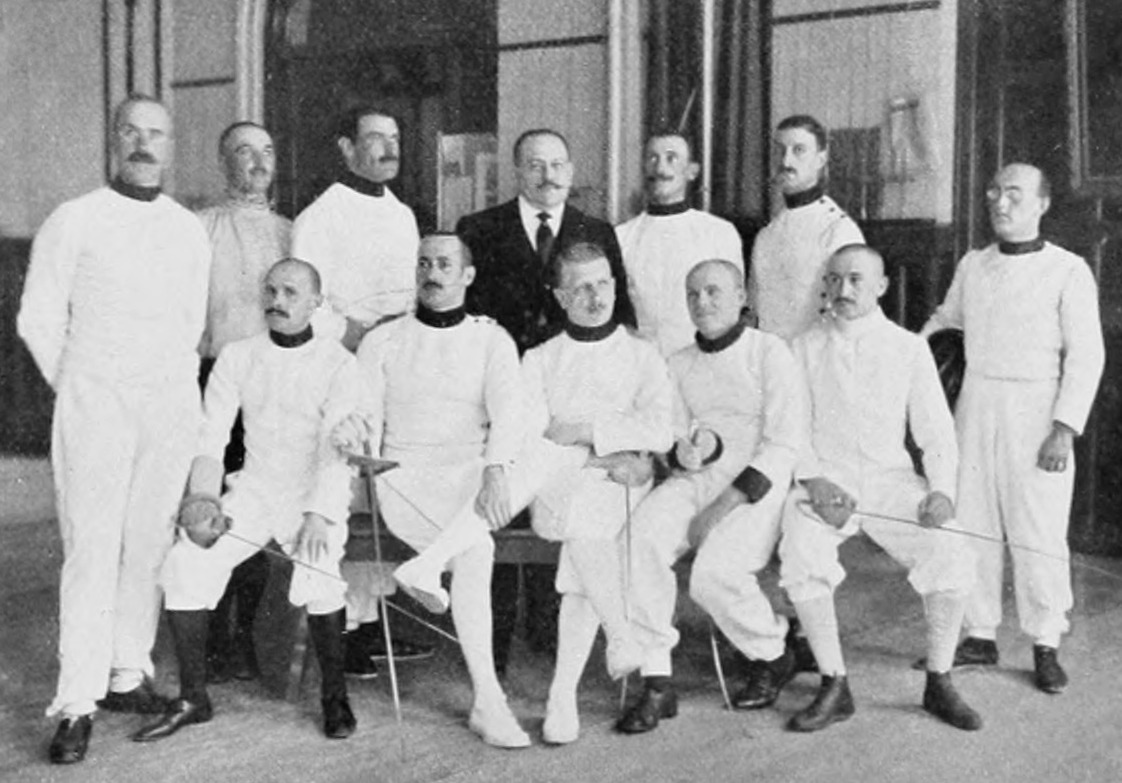
- The winning team of Hungary.
- Venue: Östermalm Athletic Grounds
- Dates: July 14–15, 1912
- Competitors: 69 from 11 nations

Medalists
1st place, gold medalist(s)		Hungary; László Berti, Dezső Földes, Jenő Fuchs, Oskar Gerde, Ervin Mészáros, Zoltán Schenker, Péter Tóth, Lajos Werkner
2nd place, silver medalist(s)		Austria; Albert Bogen, Rudolf Cvetko, Friedrich Golling, Otto Herschmann, Andreas Suttner, Reinhold Trampler, Richard Verderber
3rd place, bronze medalist(s)		Netherlands; Willem van Blijenburgh, Jetze Doorman, Adrianus de Jong, Hendrik de Jongh, George van Rossem, Dirk Scalongne

The men's team sabre was a fencing event held as part of the Fencing at the 1912 Summer Olympics programme in Stockholm, Sweden. It was the second appearance of the event, which had been introduced in 1908.

== Rosters ==
Austria

- Richard Verderber
- Otto Herschmann
- Rudolf Cvetko
- Andreas Suttner
- Friedrich Golling
- Albert Bógathy
- Reinhold Trampler

Belgium

- Henri Anspach
- Léon Tom
- Marcel Berré
- Philippe Le Hardy de Beaulieu
- Robert Hennet

Bohemia

- Josef Pfeiffer
- Vilém Goppold z Lobsdorfu, Sr.
- Bedřich Schejbal
- Josef Čipera
- Otakar Švorčík

Denmark

- Jens Berthelsen
- Ejnar Levison
- Hans Olsen
- Ivan Osiier
- Lauritz Christian Østrup

Great Britain

- Archie Corble
- Edward Brookfield
- Alfred Ridley-Martin
- Harry Butterworth
- Richard Crawshay
- William Marsh

Germany

- Friedrich Schwarz
- Fritz Jack
- Johann Adam
- Georg Stöhr
- Walther Meienreis
- Hermann Plaskuda
- Jakob Erckrath de Bary
- Emil Schön
- Julius Lichtenfels

Hungary

- Jenő Fuchs
- Zoltán Schenker
- László Berti
- Ervin Mészáros
- Péter Tóth
- Lajos Werkner
- Oszkár Gerde
- Dezső Földes

Italy

- Edoardo Alaimo
- Giovanni Benfratello
- Fernando Cavallini
- Nedo Nadi
- Ugo Di Nola
- Gino Belloni

Netherlands

- Jetze Doorman
- Dirk Scalongne
- Adrianus de Jong
- Willem Hubert van Blijenburgh
- Hendrik de Iongh
- George van Rossem

Russia

- Vladimir Andreyev
- Aleksandr Shkylev
- Vladimir Danich
- Apollon Guiber von Greifenfels
- Nikolay Kuznetsov
- Aleksandr Mordovin
- Georgy Zakyrich
- Anatoly Timofeyev

Sweden

- Axel Jöhncke
- Helge Werner
- Birger Personne
- Carl-Gustaf Klerck

== Results ==
=== Quarterfinals ===
Pool A
Place	Fencer	Wins	Losses	Qual.
1	Bohemia	—		QS
1	Hungary	—		QS
Pool B
Place	Fencer	Wins	Losses	Qual.
1	Belgium	1	0	QS
1	Italy	1	0	QS
3	Russia	0	2	
Pool C
Place	Fencer	Wins	Losses	Qual.
1	Great Britain	1	0	QS
2	Germany	0	0	QS
3	Sweden	0	1	
Pool D
Place	Fencer	Wins	Losses	Qual.
1	Austria	2	0	QS
2	Netherlands	1	1	QS
3	Denmark	0	2	

=== Semifinals ===
Pool A
Place	Fencer	Wins	Losses	Qual.
1	Bohemia	3	0	QF
2	Netherlands	2	1	QF
3	Belgium	1	2	
4	Great Britain	0	3	
Pool B
Place	Fencer	Wins	Losses	Qual.
1	Hungary	3	0	QF
2	Austria	2	1	QF
3	Italy	1	2	
4	Germany	0	3	

=== Final ===
Final
Place	Fencer	Team wins	Team losses	Ind. wins	Ind. losses
Gold	Hungary	3	0	24	8
Silver	Austria	2	1	24	20
Bronze	Netherlands	1	2	14	30
4	Bohemia	0	3	14	18
