= Austria at the 1912 Summer Olympics =

- IOC code: AUT
- NOC: Austrian Olympic Committee

in Stockholm
- Competitors: 85 (76 men and 6 women) in 12 sports
- Medals Ranked 17th: Gold 0 Silver 2 Bronze 2 Total 4

Summer Olympics appearances (overview)
- 1896; 1900; ~~1904~~; 1908; 1912; 1920; 1924; 1928; 1932; 1936; 1948; 1952; 1956; 1960; 1964; 1968; 1972; 1976; 1980; 1984; 1988; 1992; 1996; 2000; 2004; 2008; 2012; 2016; 2020; 2024; 2028

Other related appearances
- 1906 Intercalated Games

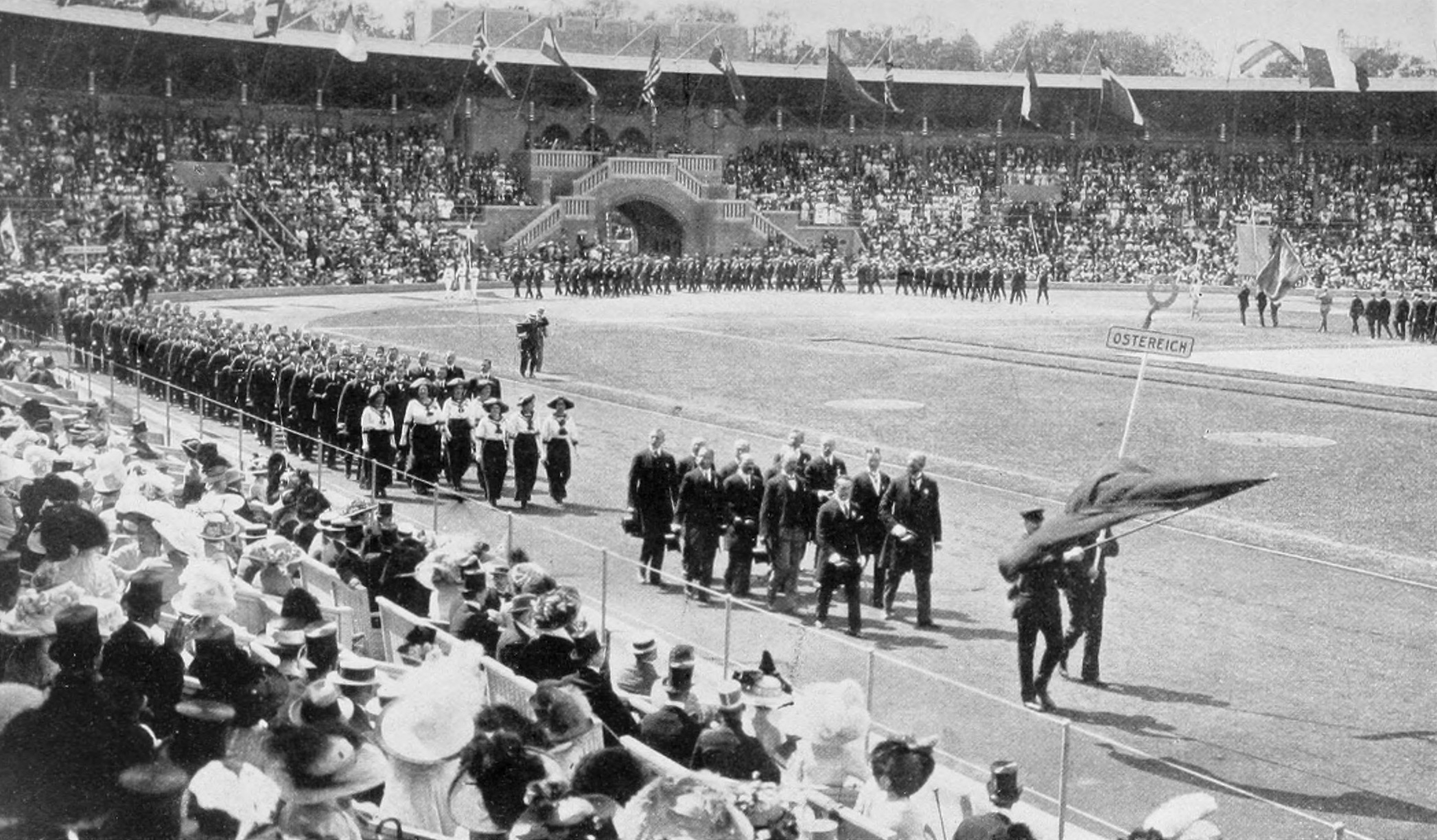
The team of Austria at the opening ceremony.

Austria competed at the 1912 Summer Olympics in Stockholm, Sweden. Austrian and Hungarian results at early Olympic Games are generally kept separate despite the union of the two nations as Austria-Hungary at the time. 85 competitors, 76 men and 6 women, took part in 46 events in 12 sports.

== Medalists ==
Medal	Name	Sport	Event	Date
Silver	Richard Verderber; Otto Herschmann; Rudolf Cvetko; Friedrich Golling; Andreas Suttner; Albert Bogen; Reinhold Trampler	Fencing	Men's team sabre	July 15
Silver	Felix Pipes; Arthur Zborzil	Tennis	Men's outdoor doubles	July 5
Bronze	Richard Verderber	Fencing	Men's foil	July 8
Bronze	Margarete Adler; Klara Milch; Josephine Sticker; Berta Zahourek	Swimming	Women's 4 × 100 m freestyle relay	July 15

== Aquatics ==
=== Swimming ===
Eight swimmers competed for Austria at the 1912 Games. It was the fifth time the nation had competed in swimming, a sport in which Austria had competed at each Olympic Games. The team finished with a bronze medal, won in the women's relay event, for the third straight time that the Austrian swimming team had won precisely one bronze medal.

None of the Austrian swimmers advanced to the finals in their individual events; only two reached the semifinals. The women's relay team was one of four to compete. A single race was held, in which the Austrian women came in third behind Great Britain and Germany but before the host Sweden.

Men

Swimmer	Events	Heat		Quarterfinal		Semifinal		Final	
Swimmer	Events	Result	Rank	Result	Rank	Result	Rank	Result	Rank
Franz Schuh	400 m freestyle	N/A		6:09.4	3	Did not advance			
Franz Schuh	1500 m freestyle	N/A		25:19.8	2 Q	Did not start		Did not advance	
Zeno von Singalewicz	400 m breaststroke	N/A		7:04.0	3 q	Did not finish		Did not advance	
Josef Wastl	200 m breaststroke	N/A		3:25.6	4	Did not advance			
Josef Wastl	400 m breaststroke	N/A		Did not finish		Did not advance			

Women

Swimmer	Events	Heat		Quarterfinal		Semifinal		Final	
Swimmer	Events	Result	Rank	Result	Rank	Result	Rank	Result	Rank
Margarete Adler	100 m freestyle	N/A		1:34.4	4	Did not advance			
Josefa Kellner	100 m freestyle	N/A		1:41.2	4	Did not advance			
Klara Milch	100 m freestyle	N/A		1:37.2	3	Did not advance			
Josephine Sticker	100 m freestyle	N/A		1:31.8	4	Did not advance			
Berta Zahourek	100 m freestyle	N/A		1:38.6	3	Did not advance			
Margarete Adler; Klara Milch; Josephine Sticker; Berta Zahourek	4 × 100 m free relay	N/A						6:17.0	3rd place, bronze medalist(s)

=== Water polo ===
Austria made its Olympic water polo debut in 1912. The team advanced to the final, on the strength of a one-goal win over Hungary in the quarterfinals and a bye in the semifinals. Austria was then crushed by the British side, 8 to nil, in the final. Following this, and due to the use of the Bergvall System for the tournament, the Austrians did not automatically win the silver medal (as they would in a standard single-elimination tournament) but had to compete further. Their first silver-medal round match was against Sweden; a win in this match would pit the Austrians against Belgium for silver and bronze. Austria lost, however, and thus their match against Belgium meant either bronze or fourth place for the squad. A tight loss to the Belgians dropped the Austrian side from the medals race.

Team	Event	Quarterfinals	Semifinals	Finals	Repechage semifinal	Repechage final	Silver round 1	Silver round 2	Silver match	Rank
Team	Event	Opposition Score	Opposition Score	Opposition Score	Opposition Score	Opposition Score	Opposition Score	Opposition Score	Opposition Score	Rank
Austria	Water polo	Hungary; W 5–4	Bye	Great Britain; L 0–8	Bye	Bye	Sweden; L 1–8	Belgium; L 5–4	Did not advance	4

Quarterfinals

July 9, 1912	Austria	5–4	Hungary	Djurgårdsbrunnsviken
July 9, 1912	Scheff, ?	Goals	Fazekas, Hégner, Rémi, ?	Djurgårdsbrunnsviken

Final

July 13, 1912	Austria	0–8	Great Britain	Djurgårdsbrunnsviken
July 13, 1912		Goals	?	Djurgårdsbrunnsviken

Silver round 1

July 14, 1912	Austria	1–8	Sweden	Djurgårdsbrunnsviken
July 14, 1912	Scheff	Goals	R. Andersson (3), Bergqvist (3), V. Andersson (2)	Djurgårdsbrunnsviken

Silver round 2

July 15, 1912	Sweden	4–5	Belgium	Djurgårdsbrunnsviken
July 15, 1912	Scheff, ?	Goals	?	Djurgårdsbrunnsviken

== Athletics ==
12 athletes represented Austria. It was the third appearance of the nation in athletics. Hans Tronner's fifth-place finish in the discus throw was the best result for Austria in 1912, tying the best placing in the nation's history for athletics.

The rank given is the rank in that athlete's heat.

Athlete	Events	Heat		Semifinal		Final	
Athlete	Events	Result	Rank	Result	Rank	Result	Rank
Philipp Ehrenreich	Long jump	N/A		6.14	23	Did not advance	
Fritz Fleischer	100 m	?	4	Did not advance			
Fritz Fleischer	200 m	?	3	Did not advance			
Viktor Franzl	Long jump	N/A		6.57	18	Did not advance	
Viktor Franzl	Pole vault	N/A		3.20	18	Did not advance	
Karl Hack	Marathon	N/A				Did not finish	
Gustav Krojer	Triple jump	N/A		13.45	15	Did not advance	
Gustav Krojer	Javelin throw	N/A		No mark	24	Did not advance	
Gustav Krojer	Pentathlon	N/A				Elim-3 54	21
Felix Kwieton	Marathon	N/A				3:00:48.0	20
Wladyslaw Ponurski	200 m	?	4	Did not advance			
Wladyslaw Ponurski	400 m	?	3	Did not advance			
Emmerich Rath	Marathon	N/A				3:27:03.8	33
Emmerich Rath	Ind. cross country	N/A				Did not finish	
Rudolf Rauch	100 m	?	3	Did not advance			
Rudolf Rauch	200 m	?	3	Did not advance			
Josef Schäffer	Shot put	N/A		11.44	13	Did not advance	
Josef Schäffer	Discus throw	N/A		34.87	29	Did not advance	
Josef Schäffer	Two handed discus	N/A		63.50	16	Did not advance	
Josef Schäffer	Decathlon	N/A				6568.585	10
Hans Tronner	Discus throw	N/A		41.24	5	Did not advance	
Hans Tronner	Two handed discus	N/A		66.66	13	Did not advance	
Fritz Weinzinger	100 m	?	3	Did not advance			
Fritz Fleischer; Gustav Kröjer; Rudolf Rauch; Fritz Weinzinger	4 × 100 m	44.8	2	Did not advance			

== Cycling ==
6 cyclists represented Austria. It was the second appearance of the nation in cycling, in which Austria had not competed since 1896. Robert Rammer was the first Austrian to finish the time trial, which was the only cycling race held; he placed 23rd. As a team, the top four Austrian cyclists placed 7th out of the 15 competing teams.

=== Road cycling ===
Cyclist	Events	Final	
Cyclist	Events	Result	Rank
Josef Hellensteiner	Ind. time trial	11:54:00.2	45
Adolf Kofler	Ind. time trial	11:39:32.6	31
Rudolf Kramer	Ind. time trial	11:53:12.8	43
Robert Rammer	Ind. time trial	11:30:40.8	23
Alois Wacha	Ind. time trial	12:01:12.4	52
Josef Zilker	Ind. time trial	11:54:38.7	46
Josef Hellensteiner; Adolf Kofler; Rudolf Kramer; Robert Rammer	Team time trial	46:57:26.4	7

== Diving ==
A single diver represented Austria, which was one of three nations (along with Great Britain and host Sweden) to send women to the first Olympic women's diving competition. It was Austria's first appearance in diving. Hanny Kellner did not finish the competition.

Diver	Events	Heats		Final	
Diver	Events	Result	Rank	Result	Rank
Hanny Kellner	10 m platform	Did not finish		Did not advance	

== Fencing ==
12 fencers represented Austria. It was the fourth appearance of the nation in fencing, in which Austria had not competed in 1904. The sabre team's second-place finish was Austria's best fencing result to date, as the nation had done no better than bronze before. It was Otto Herschmann's second silver medal—he had won one in swimming 16 years earlier. Richard Verderber, another member of the sabre team, was the only Austrian to qualify for the final in an individual event, winning the bronze in the foil event.

Fencer	Event	Round 1		Quarterfinal		Semifinal		Final	
Fencer	Event	Record	Rank	Record	Rank	Record	Rank	Record	Rank
Albert Bogen	Sabre	2 wins	2 Q	Did not start		Did not advance			
Rudolf Cvetko	Foil	3 losses	5	Did not advance					
Franz Dereani	Foil	4 losses	5	Did not advance					
Franz Dereani	Sabre	1 win	2 Q	Did not start		Did not advance			
Friedrich Golling	Foil	2 losses	3 Q	4 losses	5	Did not advance			
Friedrich Golling	Sabre	2 wins	4	Did not advance					
Arthur Griez von Ronse	Épée	4 losses	3 Q	3 losses	4	Did not advance			
Karl Münich	Sabre	3 wins	1 Q	Did not start		Did not advance			
Josef Puhm	Foil	3 losses	4	Did not advance					
Josef Puhm	Sabre	2 wins	3 Q	Did not start		Did not advance			
Andreas Suttner	Foil	3 losses	4	Did not advance					
Reinhold Trampler	Foil	5 losses	6	Did not advance					
Richard Verderber	Foil	1 loss	1 Q	2 losses	3 Q	0 losses	1 Q	4–3	3rd place, bronze medalist(s)
Ernest zu Hohenlohe	Sabre	Bye			3 losses	4	Did not advance		
Albert Bogen; Rudolf Cvetko; Friedrich Golling; Otto Herschmann; Andreas Suttner; Reinhold Trampler; Richard Verderber	Team sabre	N/A		2–0	1 Q	2–1	2 Q	2–1	2nd place, silver medalist(s)

== Football ==
Round of 16

1912-06-29

Austria	5–1	Germany
Robert Merz 75' 81'; Studnicka 58'; Neubauer 62'; Cimera 89'		Jäger 35'

Råsunda Stadium, Stockholm
Attendance: 2,000

Quarterfinals

1912-06-30

Netherlands	3–1	Austria
Bouvy 8' ten Cate 12'; Vos 30'		Müller 41'

Råsunda Stadium, Stockholm
Attendance: 7,000

Consolation quarterfinals

1912-07-01

Austria	1–0	Norway
Grundwald 2'

Traneberg Stadium, Stockholm
Attendance: 200

Consolation semifinals

1912-07-03

Austria	5–1	Italy
Grundwald 40' 89'; Müller 30'; Hussak 49'; Studnicka 65'		Berardo 81'

Olympiastadion, Stockholm
Attendance: 3,500

Consolation final

1912-07-05

Hungary	3–0	Austria
Schlosser 32'; Pataki 60'; Bodnár 76'

Råsunda Stadium, Stockholm
Attendance: 5,000

Final rank
6th place

== Modern pentathlon ==
Austria had one competitor in the first Olympic pentathlon competition.

(The scoring system was point-for-place in each of the five events, with the smallest point total winning.)

Athlete	Shooting		Swimming		Fencing			Riding			Running		Total points	Rank
Athlete	Score	Points	Time	Points	Wins	Touches	Points	Penalties	Time	Points	Time	Points	Total points	Rank
Edmond Bernhardt	135	26	5:03.6	2	17	18	6	0	12:01.6	12	22:34.0	14	60	8

== Rowing ==
Six rowers represented Austria. It was the nation's first appearance in rowing. Neither of Austria's two boats finished their first round heats.

(Ranks given are within each crew's heat.)

Rower	Event	Heats		Quarterfinals		Semifinals		Final	
Rower	Event	Result	Rank	Result	Rank	Result	Rank	Result	Rank
Alfred Heinrich	Single sculls	Did not finish		Did not advance					
Hugo Cuzna; Emil Jand (cox); Georg Kröder; Fritz Krombholz; Richard Mayer	Coxed four	Did not finish		Did not advance					

== Shooting ==
Seven shooters represented Austria. It was the nation's first appearance in shooting.

Rower	Event	Final	
Rower	Event	Result	Rank
Edmond Bernhardt	50 m pistol	245	53
Edmond Bernhardt	30 m rapid fire pistol	194	40
Johann Dulnig	600 m free rifle	41	81
Johann Dulnig	300 m military rifle, 3 pos.	41	81
Heinrich Elbogen	100 m deer, single shots	38	7
Heinrich Elbogen	100 m deer, double shots	48	16
Adolf Michel	100 m deer, single shots	36	10
Peter Paternelli	100 m deer, single shots	31	15
Adolf Schmal, Jr.	50 m pistol	406	39
Adolf Schmal, Jr.	30 m rapid fire pistol	269	20
Eberhard Steinböck	100 m deer, single shots	23	31
Heinrich Elbogen; Adolf Michel; Peter Paternelli; Eberhard Steinböck	100 m team deer, single shots	115	4

== Tennis ==
Three tennis players represented Austria at the 1912 Games. It was the nation's second appearance, and two of the players were veterans of the 1908 Summer Olympics. These two, Pipes and Zborzil, gave the nation its first Olympic medal in tennis with their silver in the outdoor doubles—an event in which they had lost a quarterfinal match four years earlier.

Men

Athlete	Event	Round of 128	Round of 64	Round of 32	Round of 16	Quarterfinals	Semifinals	Final	
Athlete	Event	Opposition Score	Opposition Score	Opposition Score	Opposition Score	Opposition Score	Opposition Score	Opposition Score	Rank
Felix Pipes	Outdoor singles	Lindpainter (GER); W 6–2, 6–3, 6–3	Tapscott (RSA); L 3–6, 7–5, 4–6, 7–5, 7–5	did not advance					31
Ludwig von Salm	Outdoor singles	Bye	Petersen (NOR); W 6–1, 7–5, 6–3	Boström (SWE); W 7–5, 6–4, 6–1	Wennergren (SWE); W 6–3, 5–7, 7–5, 6–1	Kitson (RSA); L 6–2, 6–2, 6–4	Did not advance		5
Arthur Zborzil	Outdoor singles	Bye	Benckert (SWE); W 6–2, 6–4, 1–6, 6–3	Robětín (BOH); W 6–4, 6–2, 6–1	Šebek (BOH); W 6–1, 6–0, 3–6, 6–2	Kreuzer (GER); L 6–4, 6–3, 6–2	Did not advance		5
Felix Pipes; Arthur Zborzil	Outdoor doubles	N/A		Bjørklund & Smith (NOR); W 6–0, 6–2, 6–0	Bye	Benckert & Boström (SWE); W 6–3, 4–6, 6–1, 6–1	Canet & Mény (FRA); W 7–5, 2–6, 3–6, 10–8, 10–8	Kitson & Winslow (RSA); L 4–6, 6–1, 6–2, 6–2	2nd place, silver medalist(s)

== Wrestling ==
=== Greco-Roman ===
Eight wrestlers competed in Austria's Olympic wrestling debut, two each in four of the five weight classes. Four of the eight reached the fourth round of competition before receiving their second loss, but none was able to advance further into the tournament.

Wrestler	Class	First round	Second round	Third round	Fourth round	Fifth round	Sixth round	Seventh round	Final			
Wrestler	Class	Opposition Result	Opposition Result	Opposition Result	Opposition Result	Opposition Result	Opposition Result	Opposition Result	Match A Opposition Result	Match B Opposition Result	Match C Opposition Result	Rank
Karl Barl	Light heavyweight	Pikker (RUS); L	Løvold (NOR); W	Christensen (DEN); L	did not advance							16
Viktor Fischer	Lightweight	Frydenlund (NOR); W	Laitinen (FIN); L	Hansen (DEN); W	Malmström (SWE); L	did not advance						17
Peter Kokotowitsch	Middleweight	Gargano (ITA); W	Fältström (SWE); L	Polis (RUS); W	Jokinen (FIN); L	did not advance						11
Hans Rauss	Featherweight	Koskelo (FIN); L	Retzer (USA); W	Bye	Lehmusvirta (FIN); L	did not advance						12
Friedrich Schärer	Featherweight	Retzer (USA); W	Andersson (SWE); W	Koskelo (FIN); L	Hetmar (DEN); L	did not advance						12
Josef Stejskal	Lightweight	Tirkkonen (FIN); L	Urvikko (FIN); L	did not advance								31
Alois Totuschek	Middleweight	Johansson (SWE); L	Rhys (GBR); W	Frank (SWE); W	Westerlund (FIN); L	did not advance						11
Johann Trestler	Light heavyweight	Gardini (ITA); L	Lange (GER); L	did not advance								20
