= Hungary at the 1912 Summer Olympics =

- IOC code: HUN
- NOC: Hungarian Olympic Committee

in Stockholm
- Competitors: 119 in 11 sports
- Flag bearer: Jenő Rittich
- Medals Ranked 9th: Gold 3 Silver 2 Bronze 3 Total 8

Summer Olympics appearances (overview)
- 1896; 1900; 1904; 1908; 1912; 1920; 1924; 1928; 1932; 1936; 1948; 1952; 1956; 1960; 1964; 1968; 1972; 1976; 1980; 1984; 1988; 1992; 1996; 2000; 2004; 2008; 2012; 2016; 2020; 2024; 2028

Other related appearances
- 1906 Intercalated Games

Hungary competed at the 1912 Summer Olympics in Stockholm, Sweden. Austrian and Hungarian results at early Olympic Games are generally kept separate despite the union of the two nations as Austria-Hungary at the time. 121 competitors, all men, took part in 52 events in 11 sports.

== Medalists ==
The following Hungarian competitors won medals at the games. In the discipline sections below, the medalists' names are bolded.

Medal	Name	Sport	Event	Date
Gold	Sándor Prokopp	Shooting	Men's 300 metre military rifle, three positions	1 July
Gold	Jenő Fuchs; Zoltán Ozoray Schenker; László Berti; Ervin Mészáros; Péter Tóth; Lajos Werkner; Oszkár Gerde; Dezső Földes	Fencing	Men's team sabre	15 July
Gold	Jenő Fuchs	Fencing	Men's sabre	18 July
Silver	József Bittenbinder; Imre Erdődy; Samu Fóti; Imre Gellért; Győző Haberfeld; Ottó Hellmich; István Herczeg; József Keresztessy; Lajos Kmetykó; János Krizmanich; Elemér Pászti; Árpád Pédery; Jenő Rittich; Ferenc Szűts; Ödön Téry; Géza Tuli	Gymnastics	Men's team	11 July
Silver	Béla Békessy	Fencing	Men's sabre	18 July
Bronze	Mór Kóczán	Athletics	Men's javelin throw	14 July
Bronze	Béla Varga	Wrestling	Men's Greco-Roman light heavyweight	15 July
Bronze	Ervin Mészáros	Fencing	Men's sabre	18 July

Default sort order: Medal, Date, Name

Medals by sport
**Sport**	Gold medal	Silver medal	Bronze medal	Total
Fencing	2	1	1	4
Shooting	1	0	0	1
Gymnastics	0	1	0	1
Athletics	0	0	1	1
Wrestling	0	0	1	1
Total	3	2	3	8

=== Multiple medalists ===
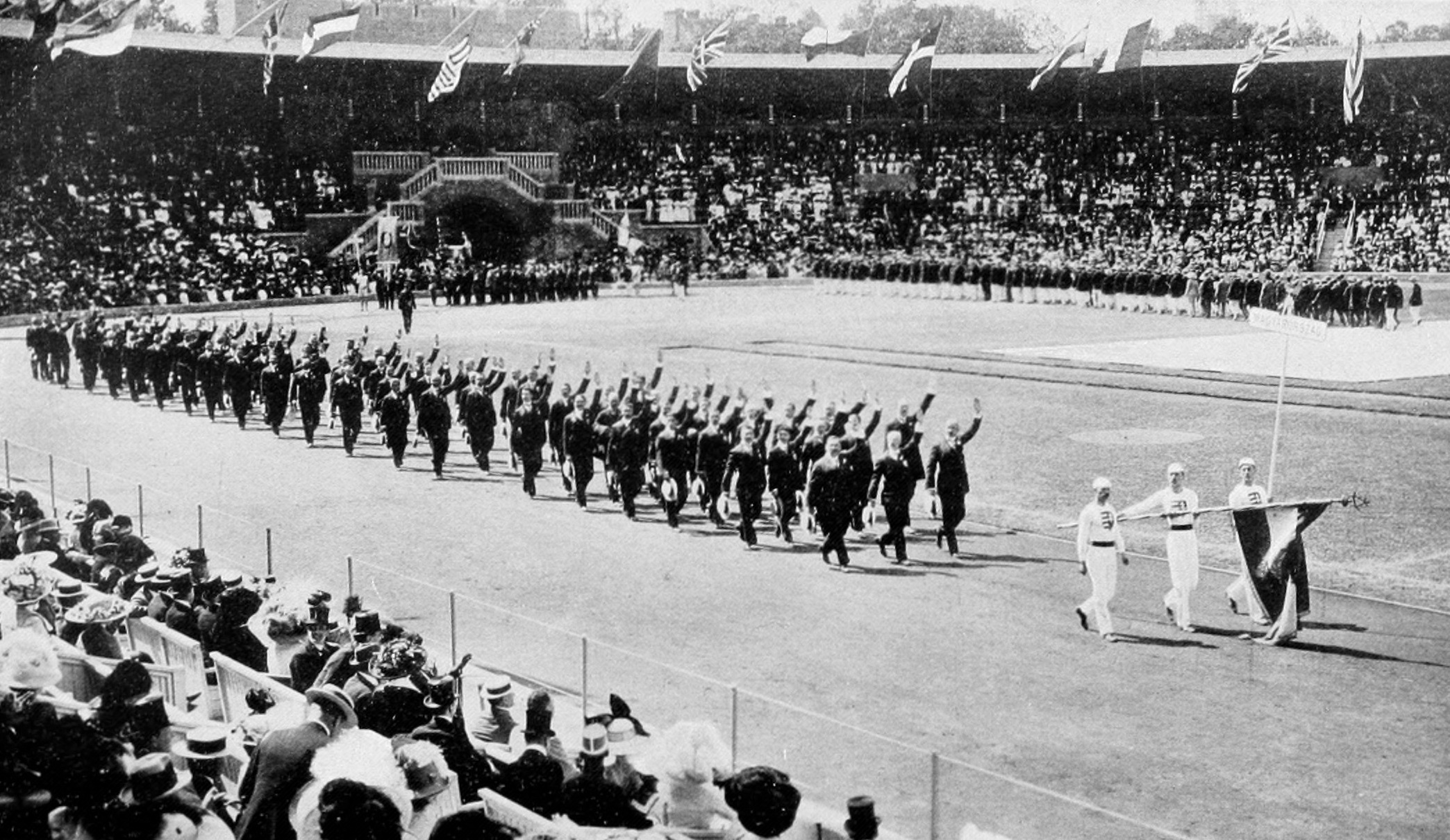
The team of Hungary at the opening ceremony.

The following competitors won multiple medals at the 1912 Olympic Games.

Name	Medal	Sport	Event
Jenő Fuchs	Gold; Gold	Fencing	Men's team sabre Men's sabre
Ervin Mészáros	Gold; Bronze	Fencing	Men's team sabre Men's sabre

== Competitors ==
The following is the list of number of competitors participating in the Games:

Sport	Men	Women	Total
Athletics	25	0	25
Cycling	5	0	5
Fencing	13	0	13
Football	14	0	14
Gymnastics	17	0	17
Rowing	11	0	11
Shooting	10	0	10
Swimming	8	0	8
Tennis	4	0	4
Water polo	7	0	7
Wrestling	10	0	10
Total	119	0	119

The following is the list of dates, when Hungary won medals:

Medals by date
Date	Gold medal	Silver medal	Bronze medal	Total
1 July	1	0	0	1
11 July	0	1	0	1
14 July	0	0	1	1
15 July	1	0	1	2
18 July	1	1	1	3
Total	3	2	3	8

== Aquatics ==
=== Swimming ===
Eight swimmers competed for Hungary at the 1912 Games. It was the fifth time the nation appeared in swimming, in which Hungary had competed at every Olympic Games.

The 1912 Games were the first time that no Hungarian swimmer won a medal. Baronyi and Las-Torres each made a final once, placing fourth and fifth, respectively. The relay team also advanced to the final, but did not start.

Ranks given for each swimmer are within the heat.

Men

Swimmer	Events	Heat		Quarterfinal		Semifinal		Final	
Swimmer	Events	Result	Rank	Result	Rank	Result	Rank	Result	Rank
András Baronyi	100 m backstroke	N/A		1:22.0	1 Q	1:26.2	3 q	1:25.2	4
László Beleznai	100 m freestyle	1:08.0	1 Q	Did not start		Did not advance			
Oszkár Demján	200 m breaststroke	N/A		3:07.8	1 Q	3:11.2	4	Did not advance	
Oszkár Demján	400 m breaststroke	N/A		Disqualified		Did not advance			
Alajos Kenyery	100 m freestyle	Unknown	4–6	Did not advance					
Alajos Kenyery	400 m freestyle	N/A		5:46.0	2 Q	Did not start		Did not advance	
Béla Las-Torres	400 m freestyle	N/A		5:36.2	1 Q	5:34.8	2 Q	5:42.0	5
Béla Las-Torres	1500 m freestyle	N/A		22:58.0	1 Q	23:09.8	1 Q	Did not finish	
László Szentgróthy	100 m freestyle	Unknown	3	Did not advance					
László Szentgróthy	100 m backstroke	N/A		1:26.6	1 Q	1:26.4	4	Did not advance	
János Wenk	100 m backstroke	N/A		Disqualified		Did not advance			
László Beleznai; Alajos Kenyery; Béla Las-Torres; Imre Zachár	4 × 200 m free relay	N/A				10:34.6	2 Q	Did not start	

=== Water polo ===
Hungary made its Olympic debut in 1912. The squad's last place finish and 0–2 record are somewhat misleading; Hungary lost both its matches by a single goal in each.

Team	Event	Quarterfinals	Semifinals	Finals	Repechage semifinal	Repechage final	Silver round 1	Silver round 2	Silver match	Rank
Team	Event	Opposition Score	Opposition Score	Opposition Score	Opposition Score	Opposition Score	Opposition Score	Opposition Score	Opposition Score	Rank
Hungary	Water polo	Austria; L 4–5	Did not advance		Belgium; L 5–6	Did not advance				6

Quarterfinals

9 July 1912	Hungary	4–5	Austria	Djurgårdsbrunnsviken
9 July 1912	Fazekas, Hégner, Rémi, ?	Goals	Scheff, ?	Djurgårdsbrunnsviken

Repechage semifinal

10 July 1912	Hungary	5–6	Belgium	Djurgårdsbrunnsviken
10 July 1912	Fazekas (3), Rémi, ?	Goals	?	Djurgårdsbrunnsviken

== Athletics ==
27 athletes represented Hungary. It was the fifth appearance of the nation in athletics, in which Hungary had competed at each Olympics. Kóczán's bronze medal in the javelin throw was the only athletics medal won by a Hungarian; he and Wardener were the only two to advance to the finals via eliminations (Kárpáti and Ripszám ran the marathon, which consisted of only the final). Wardener finished 9th in the high jump.

Ranks given are within that athlete's heat for running events.

Athlete	Events	Heat		Semifinal		Final	
Athlete	Events	Result	Rank	Result	Rank	Result	Rank
János Antal	800 m	Did not finish		Did not advance			
András Baronyi	Standing long jump	N/A		3.13	7	Did not advance	
Ödön Bodor	400 m	?	6	Did not advance			
Ödön Bodor	800 m	?	3	Did not advance			
István Déván	200 m	?	2 Q	?	4	Did not advance	
István Déván	400 m	?	3	Did not advance			
István Drubina	10 km walk	N/A		Did not finish		Did not advance	
Ferenc Forgács	800 m	?	5–7	Did not advance			
Ferenc Forgács	1500 m	N/A		?	5	Did not advance	
Samu Fóti	Discus throw	N/A		36.37	25	Did not advance	
Andor Horvag	Standing high jump	N/A		No mark	18	Did not advance	
István Jankovich	100 m	?	2 Q	?	4	Did not advance	
Ödön Kárpáti	Marathon	N/A				3:25:21.6	31
Károly Kobulszky	Discus throw	N/A		38.15	19	Did not advance	
Károly Kobulszky	2 hand discus	N/A		59.48	18	Did not advance	
Mór Kóczán	Discus throw	N/A		33.30	33	Did not advance	
Mór Kóczán	Javelin throw	N/A		54.99	3 Q	55.50	3rd place, bronze medalist(s)
Mór Kóczán	2 hand javelin	N/A		66.69	12	Did not advance	
Nándor Kovács	Long jump	N/A		5.96	26	Did not advance	
Lajos Ludinszky	High jump	N/A		1.60	28	Did not advance	
György Luntzer	Discus throw	N/A		37.88	21	Did not advance	
György Luntzer	2 hand discus	N/A		No mark	20	Did not advance	
Imre Mudin	Shot put	N/A		12.81	6	Did not advance	
Vilmos Rácz	100 m	?	2 Q	?	6	Did not advance	
Károly Radóczy	800 m	Did not finish		Did not advance			
Henrik Ripszám	Marathon	N/A				Did not finish	
Henrik Ripszám	10 km walk	N/A		55:20.6	8	Did not advance	
Teofil Savniky	1500 m	N/A		?	4–5	Did not advance	
Károly Solymár	110 m hurdles	15.8	2 Q	Did not finish		Did not advance	
Pál Szalay	100 m	?	2 Q	?	4	Did not advance	
Pál Szalay	Long jump	N/A		5.98	25	Did not advance	
Ervin Szerelemhegyi	100 m	?	4	Did not advance			
Ervin Szerelemhegyi	200 m	?	4	Did not advance			
Ervin Szerelemhegyi	400 m	?	2 Q	?	3	Did not advance	
Ferenc Szobota	100 m	?	2 Q	?	6	Did not advance	
Rezsõ Újlaki	Discus throw	N/A		39.82	9	Did not advance	
Rezsõ Újlaki	2 hand discus	N/A		66.18	14	Did not advance	
Iván Wardener	High jump	N/A		1.83	1 Q	1.80	9
Frigyes Wiesner	200 m	?	2 Q	?	5	Did not advance	
Frigyes Wiesner	400 m	50.8	1 Q	?	4	Did not advance	
Ödön Bodor; István Déván; Ervin Szerelemhegyi; Frigyes Wiesner	4 × 400 m	N/A		3:29.4	3	Did not advance	
István Jankovich; Vilmos Rácz; Pál Szalay; Ferenc Szobota	4 × 100 m	43.7	1 Q	42.9	2	Did not advance	

== Cycling ==
Five cyclists represented Hungary. It was the first appearance of the nation in cycling. István Müller had the best time in the time trial, the only race held, finishing 73rd. The four Hungarian cyclists who finished had a combined time that placed them twelfth in the team competition.

=== Road cycling ===
Cyclist	Events	Final	
Cyclist	Events	Result	Rank
János Henzsel	Ind. time trial	12:42:16.3	75
Gyula Mazur	Ind. time trial	12:50:55.8	77
István Müller	Ind. time trial	12:39:28.0	73
Ignác Teiszenberger	Ind. time trial	13:38:35.8	84
Károly Teppert	Ind. time trial	Did not finish	
János Henzsel; Gyula Mazur; István Müller; Ignác Teiszenberger	Team time trial	51:51:15.9	12

== Fencing ==
Thirteen fencers represented Hungary, including six of the eight men who had competed in 1908. It was the third appearance of the nation in fencing. The Hungarians dominated the sabre competition to an even greater extent than they had four years earlier, taking all three of the medals and having seven of the eight finalists in the individual event (they had taken the gold and silver, with five of eight finalists in 1908). Not one of the Hungarian sabrists was eliminated during the first two rounds. The sabre team also successfully defended its gold medal in the team competition. The Hungarians did not fare as well in either the foil or the épée, however, with only one fencer reaching the final in either of those two events as Béla Békessy placed seventh in the foil.

Fencer	Event	Round 1		Quarterfinal		Semifinal		Final	
Fencer	Event	Record	Rank	Record	Rank	Record	Rank	Record	Rank
Béla Békessy	Foil	1 loss	1 Q	0 losses	1 Q	1 loss	2 Q	1–6	7
Béla Békessy	Épée	5 losses	7	Did not advance					
Béla Békessy	Sabre	3 wins	1 Q	1 loss	1 Q	4 wins	1 Q	5–2	2nd place, silver medalist(s)
László Berti	Foil	1 loss	1 Q	1 loss	1 Q	0 losses	1 Q	4–3	4
László Berti	Sabre	3 wins	1 Q	0 losses	1 Q	3 wins	3	Did not advance	
Bertalan Dunay	Foil	2 losses	4	Did not advance					
Bertalan Dunay	Sabre	Bye		1 loss	2 Q	1 win	4	Did not advance	
Dezső Földes	Foil	2 losses	3 Q	1 loss	2 Q	Did not finish		Did not advance	
Dezső Földes	Sabre	Bye		1 loss	1 Q	4 wins	2 Q	1–6	8
Jenő Fuchs	Sabre	Bye		0 losses	1 Q	1 win	2 Q	6–1	1st place, gold medalist(s)
Oszkár Gerde	Sabre	3 wins	1 Q	1 loss	2 Q	Did not start		Did not advance	
Ervin Mészáros	Sabre	Bye		0 losses	1 Q	5 wins	1 Q	5–2	3rd place, bronze medalist(s)
Pál Pajzs	Foil	1 loss	2 Q	2 losses	3 Q	2 losses	3	Did not advance	
Pál Pajzs	Sabre	1 win	2 Q	1 loss	1 Q	3 wins	3	Did not advance	
Pál Rosty	Épée	Bye		2 losses	2 Q	3 losses	4	Did not advance	
Zoltán Ozoray Schenker	Foil	1 loss	2 Q	0 losses	1 Q	2 losses	3	Did not advance	
Zoltán Ozoray Schenker	Sabre	3 wins	1 Q	1 loss	1 Q	4 wins	2 Q	4–3	4
Péter Tóth	Foil	1 loss	2 Q	1 loss	1 Q	2 losses	3	Did not advance	
Péter Tóth	Sabre	3 wins	1 Q	0 losses	1 Q	2 wins	1 Q	2–5	6
Lajos Werkner	Sabre	2 wins	2 Q	0 losses	1 Q	5 wins	1 Q	1–6	7
Béla Zulawszky	Foil	1 loss	2 Q	0 losses	1 Q	3 losses	4	Did not advance	
Béla Zulawszky	Sabre	3 wins	1 Q	2 losses	3 Q	2 wins	3	Did not advance	
László Berti; Dezső Földes; Jenő Fuchs; Oskar Gerde; Ervin Mészáros; Zoltán Schenker; Péter Tóth; Lajos Werkner	Team sabre	N/A		Bye		3–0	1 Q	3–0	1st place, gold medalist(s)

== Football ==
Quarterfinals

1912-06-30

Great Britain	7–0	Hungary
Walden 21' 23' 49' 53' 55' 85'; Woodward 45'

Olympiastadion, Stockholm
Attendance: 8,000

Consolation semifinals

1912-07-03

Hungary	3–1	Germany
Schlosser 3' 39' 82'		Förderer 56'

Råsunda Stadium, Stockholm
Attendance: 2,000

Consolation final

1912-07-05

Hungary	3–0	Austria
Schlosser 32'; Pataki 60'; Bodnár 76'

Råsunda Stadium, Stockholm
Attendance: 5,000

Final rank
5th place

== Gymnastics ==
Seventeen gymnasts represented Hungary. The nation entered four gymnasts in the individual competition, with Elemér Pászti having the best performance at 13th place. The Hungarian team entered one of the three team competitions and won the silver medal.

=== Artistic ===
Gymnast	Events	Final	
Gymnast	Events	Result	Rank
Imre Gellért	All-around	117.00	17
János Krizmanich	All-around	115.00	19
Elemér Pászti	All-around	119.00	13
József Szalai	All-around	117.25	15
Hungary	Team	45.45	2nd place, silver medalist(s)

== Rowing ==
Eleven rowers represented Hungary. It was the nation's second appearance in rowing. The Hungarian rowers had little success in 1912. Both of the scullers, including defending bronze medalist Károly Levitzky, had byes in the first round but were eliminated in the quarterfinals. The eights team was also defeated in its first race, in the preliminary heats.

(Ranks given are within each crew's heat.)

Rower	Event	Heats		Quarterfinals		Semifinals		Final	
Rower	Event	Result	Rank	Result	Rank	Result	Rank	Result	Rank
Károly Levitzky	Single sculls	8:04.0	1 Q	Unknown	2	Did not advance			
József Mészáros	Single sculls	8:29.0	1 Q	Unknown	2	Did not advance			
Artúr Baján; Lajos Gráf; István Jeney; Miltiades Manno; Antal Szebeny; György Szebeny; István Szebeny; Miklós Szebeny; Kálmán Vaskó (cox)	Eight	Unknown	2	Did not advance					

== Shooting ==
Ten shooters competed for Hungary. It was the nation's second appearance in shooting, with Hungary having previously competed in 1908. Hungary won its first medal in shooting when Sándor Prokopp (one of the two Hungarians who had competed in 1908) won the championship in the 300 metre military rifle in three positions.

Shooter	Event	Final	
Shooter	Event	Result	Rank
Emil Bömches	300 m free rifle, 3 pos.	828	50
Emil Bömches	600 m free rifle	51	80
Emil Bömches	300 m military rifle, 3 pos.	69	66
Béla Darányi	300 m military rifle, 3 pos.	12	91
Aladár von Farkas	300 m free rifle, 3 pos.	653	75
Aladár von Farkas	600 m free rifle	56	76
Aladár von Farkas	300 m military rifle, 3 pos.	85	24
László Hauler	50 m rifle, prone	178	29
László Hauler	300 m free rifle, 3 pos.	677	74
László Hauler	600 m free rifle	35	83
László Hauler	300 m military rifle, 3 pos.	84	27
Zoltán Jelenffy	300 m free rifle, 3 pos.	718	69
Zoltán Jelenffy	600 m free rifle	54	78
Zoltán Jelenffy	300 m military rifle, 3 pos.	48	87
Zoltán Jelenffy	50 m pistol	348	52
Géza Mészöly	300 m free rifle, 3 pos.	Did not finish	
Géza Mészöly	600 m free rifle	54	79
Géza Mészöly	300 m military rifle, 3 pos.	83	29
István Prihoda	300 m free rifle, 3 pos.	Did not finish	
István Prihoda	300 m military rifle, 3 pos.	49	85
Sándor Prokopp	300 m military rifle, 3 pos.	97	1st place, gold medalist(s)
Sándor Török	50 m rifle, prone	174	31
Sándor Török	25 m small-bore rifle	146	33
Sándor Török	50 m pistol	424	27
Sándor Török	30 m rapid fire pistol	275	9
Rezső Velez	300 m free rifle, 3 pos.	712	72
Rezső Velez	600 m free rifle	60	73
Rezső Velez	300 m military rifle, 3 pos.	92	7
Emil Bömches; Aladár Farkas; László Hauler; Géza Mészöly; István Prihoda; Rezső Velez	Team rifle	1333	10

== Tennis ==
Six tennis players represented Hungary at the 1912 Games. It was the nation's third appearance in tennis. The Hungarians had little success, compiling a record of 3–7 overall (2–6 when the match between two Hungarians is excluded) and advancing nobody past the round of 16.

Men

Athlete	Event	Round of 128	Round of 64	Round of 32	Round of 16	Quarterfinals	Semifinals	Final	
Athlete	Event	Opposition Score	Opposition Score	Opposition Score	Opposition Score	Opposition Score	Opposition Score	Opposition Score	Rank
Leó Baráth	Outdoor singles	Bye	Kelemen (HUN); L 6–1, 6–3, 6–4	Did not advance					31
Béla Kehrling	Outdoor singles	Bye	Bye	Hansen (DEN); W 6–2, 6–1, 6–8, 6–4	von Müller (GER); L 6–2, 6–1, 6–1	Did not advance			9
Aurél Kelemen	Outdoor singles	Bye	Baráth (HUN); W 6–1, 6–3, 6–4	Heyden (GER); L 6–3, 4–6, 7–5, 7–5	Did not advance				17
Jenő Zsigmondy	Outdoor singles	Bye	Bye	von Müller (GER); L 6–1, 6–2, 6–0	Did not advance				17
Leó Baráth; Aurél Kelemen	Outdoor doubles	N/A		Schomburgk von Müller (GER); L 6–0, 6–0, 6–2	Did not advance				15
Béla Kehrling; Jenő Zsigmondy	Outdoor doubles	N/A		Zeman & Robětín (BOH); W 3–6, 6–1, 6–4, 6–4	Kitson & Winslow (RSA); L 6–3, 6–3, 7–9, 6–2	Did not advance			9

== Wrestling ==
=== Greco-Roman ===
Hungary was represented by ten wrestlers in its third Olympic wrestling appearance.

Varga took Hungary's only wrestling medal of the Games, surviving an early loss to reach the medals rounds. He was beaten twice in the medals rounds, finishing with a bronze. Radvány also had a successful Games, advancing to the seventh bout of the elimination round before finally receiving his second loss to take fourth place. The team posted a combined record of 18–21 (18–19 in elimination rounds, 0–2 in the medals rounds).

Wrestler	Class	First round	Second round	Third round	Fourth round	Fifth round	Sixth round	Seventh round	Final			
Wrestler	Class	Opposition Result	Opposition Result	Opposition Result	Opposition Result	Opposition Result	Opposition Result	Opposition Result	Match A Opposition Result	Match B Opposition Result	Match C Opposition Result	Rank
Ernő Márkus	Lightweight	Gould (GBR); W	Hansen (DEN); L	Malmström (SWE); L	Did not advance							23
Árpád Miskey	Middleweight	Bergqvist (SWE); W	Ohlsson (SWE); W	Klein (RUS); L	Åberg (FIN); L	Did not advance						11
Dezső Orosz	Lightweight	Rydström (SWE); W	Lesieur (FRA); W	Urvikko (FIN); L	Mathiasson (SWE); L	Did not advance						17
József Pongrácz	Featherweight	Lysohn (USA); W	Andersen (GER); W	Kangas (FIN); L	Johansson (SWE); L	Did not advance						12
Ödön Radvány	Lightweight	Kippasto (RUS); W	Flygare (SWE); W	Kangas (FIN); L	Laitinen (FIN); W	Hansen (DEN); W	Nilsson (SWE); W	Lund (SWE); L	Did not advance			4
József Sándor	Lightweight	Jonsson (SWE); W	Nilsson (SWE); L	Saeurhöfer (GER); L	Did not advance							23
Rezső Somogyi	Middleweight	Klein (RUS); L	Johansson (SWE); L	Did not advance								26
Árpád Szántó	Lightweight	Hansen (DEN); L	Did not start	Did not advance								47
András Szoszky	Featherweight	Gerstäcker (GER); L	Haapanen (FIN); L	Did not advance								26
Béla Varga	Light heavyweight	Ekman (SWE); W	Wiklund (SWE); L	Lindberg (FIN); W	Andersson (SWE); W	Pétursson (ISL); W	Rajala (FIN); W	N/A	Ahlgren (SWE); L	Böhling (FIN); L	Did not advance	3rd place, bronze medalist(s)
