= Fencing at the 1912 Summer Olympics =

Fencing at the Games of the V Olympiad

Fencing was present at the 1912 Summer Olympics in Stockholm, Sweden. There were, five fencing events that were contested.

Because the rules of fencing had not been unified yet, the Swedish organizers decided on the rules. France did not agree that a hit on the upper arm should not count as a point, and Italy did not agree on the length of the épée, so both countries boycotted this event.

== Medal summary ==
Event	Gold	Silver	Bronze
Épée, Individual	Paul Anspach; Belgium	Ivan Joseph Martin Osiier; Denmark	Philippe le Hardy de Beaulieu; Belgium
Épée, Team	Belgium; Henri Anspach; Paul Anspach; Fernand de Montigny; Robert Hennet; Jacques Ochs; François Rom; Gaston Salmon; Victor Willems	Great Britain; Edgar Amphlett; John Blake; Percival Davson; Arthur Everitt; Martin Holt; Sydney Mertineau; Robert Montgomerie; Edgar Seligman	Netherlands; Willem van Blijenburgh; Jetze Doorman; Adrianus de Jong; George van Rossem; Leonardus Salomonson
Foil, Individual	Nedo Nadi; Italy	Pietro Speciale; Italy	Richard Verderber; Austria
Sabre, Individual	Jenő Fuchs; Hungary	Béla Békessy; Hungary	Ervin Mészáros; Hungary
Sabre, Team	Hungary; Jenő Fuchs; László Berti; Ervin Mészáros; Dezső Földes; Oszkár Gerde; Zoltán Ozoray Schenker; Péter Tóth; Lajos Werkner	Austria; Richard Verderber; Otto Herschmann; Rudolf Cvetko; Friedrich Golling; Andreas Suttner; Albert Bogen; Reinhold Trampler	Netherlands; Willem van Blijenburgh; George van Rossem; Adrianus de Jong; Jetze Doorman; Dirk Scalongne; Hendrik de Jongh

== Participating nations ==
A total of 184 fencers from 16 nations competed at the Stockholm Games:

- Austria (12)
- Belgium (11)
- Bohemia (13)
- Denmark (6)
- Germany (16)
- Great Britain (22)
- Greece (6)
- Hungary (13)
- Italy (9)
- Netherlands (12)
- Norway (7)
- Portugal (1)
- Russia (24)
- South Africa (1)
- Sweden (18)
- United States (13)

== Medal table ==
Rank	Nation	Gold	Silver	Bronze	Total
1	Hungary	2	1	1	4
2	Belgium	2	0	1	3
3	Italy	1	1	0	2
4	Austria	0	1	1	2
5	Denmark	0	1	0	1
5	Great Britain	0	1	0	1
7	Netherlands	0	0	2	2
Totals (7 entries)		5	5	5	15
