= Hungarian Fencing Championships =

Annual outdoor fencing competition

Hungarian Athletics Championships
- Most recent season or competition: 2019 Hungarian Athletics Championships
- Sport: Fencing
- Founder: Hungarian Fencing Federation
- First season: 1900
- President: Zsolt Csampa

The Hungarian Fencing Championships (Hungarian: Magyar vívóbajnokság, Országos Bajnokság, magyar bajnokság) are an annual outdoor fencing competition organized and supervised by the Hungarian Fencing Federation, which serves as the Hungarian national championships for the sport.

== Champions ==
=== Foil ===
Target are of foil.

Year	Men's		Women's	
Year	individual	team	individual	team
1900	Ervin Mészáros (MAC)	started in 1914	started in 1928	started in 1938
1901	Alajos Akay (Wesselényi VC)	—	—	—
1902	Ervin Mészáros (MAC)	—	—	—
1903	Ervin Mészáros (MAC, 2.)	—	—	—
1904	Ervin Mészáros (MAC)	—	—	—
1905	Béla Békessy (MAC)	—	—	—
1906	Béla Békessy (MAC)	—	—	—
1907	Péter Tóth (MAC)	—	—	—
1908	Péter Tóth (MAC)	—	—	—
1909	Péter Tóth (MAC)	—	—	—
1910	Dezső Földes (Fővárosi VC)	—	—	—
1911	Péter Tóth (MAC)	—	—	—
1912	Péter Pajzs (MAC)	—	—	—
1913	Péter Tóth (MAC)	—	—	—
1914	Péter Tóth (MAC)	Nemzeti VC	—	—
1915	Not contested due to World War I			
1916	Not contested due to World War I			
1917	Not contested due to World War I			
1918	Not contested due to World War I			
1919	Not contested due to World War I			
1920	Péter Tóth (MAC)	—	—	—
1921	Péter Tóth (MAC)	—	—	—
1922	Zoltán Schenker (MOVE-BSE)	—	—	—
1923	István Lichteneckert (MAC)	—	—	—
1924	Zoltán Schenker (Wesselényi VC)	—	—	—
1925	Ödön Tersztyánszky (MAC)	MAC	—	—
1926	Ödön Tersztyánszky (MAC)	MAC	—	—
1927	József Rády (MAC)	MAC	—	—
1928	Ödön Tersztyánszky (MAC)	MAC	Margit Danyi (HVTK)	—
1929	György Piller (MAC)	HTVK	Erna Bogen-Bogáti (HTVK)	—
1930	György Piller (MAC)	HTVK	Erna Bogen (HTVK)	—
1931	György Piller (MAC)	HTVK	Erna Bogen-Bogáti (BEAC)	—
1932	Ottó Hátszeghy (HTVK)	HTVK	Erna Bogen-Bogáti (BEAC)	—
1933	Ottó Hátszeghy (HTVK)	HTVK	Erna Bogen-Bogáti (BEAC)	—
1934	Ottó Hátszeghy (HTVK)	HTVK	Erna Bogen-Bogáti (BEAC)	—
1935	Aladár Gerevich (MAC)	HTVK	Erna Bogen-Bogáti (BEAC)	—
1936	Béla Bay (BEAC)	HTVK	Ilona Elek (DAC)	—
1937	József Hátszeghy (HTVK)	HTVK	Margit Elek (DAC)	—
1938	Aladár Gerevich (MAC)	HTVK	Erna Bogen-Bogáti (HTVK)	DAC
1939	Aladár Gerevich (MAC)	HTVK	Erna Bogen-Bogáti (HTVK)	DAC
1940	Aladár Gerevich (MAC)	HTVK	Katalin Majorné Horváth (HTVK)	HTVK
1941	Zsolt Bedő (HTVK)	HTVK	Erna Bogen-Bogáti (HTVK) (6)	BBTE
1942	Pál Dunay (MAC)	HTVK	Ingeborg Gündisch (BEAC)	BBTE
1943	József Hátszeghy (HTVK)	MAC	Erna Bogen-Bogáti (HTVK)	HTVK
1944	József Hátszeghy (HTVK)	HTVK	Erna Bogen-Bogáti (HTVK)	HTVK
1945	Not contested due to World War II			

=== Statistics ===
==== Men's ====
Overall

Name	Weapons	Clubs	Titles
Péter Tóth	sabre, foil	MAC	10
Aladár Gerevich	sabre, foil	MAC, Toldi Miklós SE, Csepel, Vörös Meteor	10
Béla Békessy	sabre, foil, epée	MAC	8
Tibor Berczelly	sabre, foil	HTVK, Toldi Miklós SE, Csepel, Vörös Meteor	8
