= Personne =

Personne is a surname which may refer to:

- Carl Personne (1888–1976), Swedish fencer
- Jacques Personne (1816–1880), French pharmacologist and chemist
- Nils Personne (1918–2013), Swedish Air Force lieutenant general
- Pascale Fontenel-Personne (born 1962), French politician
- Paul Personne (born 1949), French blues singer and guitarist
