= Verderber =

Verderber is a surname. Notable people with the surname include:

- Chuck Verderber (born 1959), American basketball player
- Richard Verderber (1884–1955), Austrian fencer
