= Hennet =

Hennet is a surname. Notable people with the surname include:

- George Hennet (1799–1857), English railway engineer and contractor
- Michael Hennet Sotomayor (born 1983), Spanish pop singer
- Robert Hennet (1886–1957), Belgian fencer
