= 2nd Krasnikovo =

Rural locality in Kursk Oblast, Russia

2nd Krasnikovo 2-е Красниково
- Village
- Interactive map of 2nd Krasnikovo
- Location of 2nd Krasnikovo 2nd Krasnikovo (Kursk Oblast)
- Coordinates: 51°43′53″N 36°28′06″E
- Country: Russia
- Federal subject: Kursk Oblast
- Administrative district: Kursky District
- SelsovietSelsoviet: Besedinsky

Population (2010 Census)
  - Total: 29
  - Estimate (2010): 29 (0%)

Municipal status
  - Municipal district: Kursky Municipal District
  - Rural settlement: Besedinsky Selsoviet Rural Settlement
- Time zone: UTC+3 (MSK)
- Postal code: 305501
- Dialing code: +7 4712
- OKTMO ID: 38620408151
- Website: besedino.rkursk.ru

2nd Krasnikovo or Vtoroye Krasnikovo (Russian: 2-е Красниково, Второе Красниково) is a rural locality (Russian: деревня, lit. 'village') in Besedinsky Selsoviet Rural Settlement, Kursky District, Kursk Oblast, Russia. Population: 29 (2010 census); 41 (2002 census);

== Geography ==
The village is located in the Rat River basin (a right tributary of the Seym), 106 km from the Russia–Ukraine border, 13 km east of the district center – the town Kursk, 2 km from the selsoviet center – Besedino.

Climate

2nd Krasnikovo has a warm-summer humid continental climate (Dfb in the Köppen climate classification).

== Transport ==
2nd Krasnikovo is located 1.5 km from the federal route P-298 (Kursk – Voronezh – P-22 "Kaspy" Highway; a part of the European route E38), 1 km from the road of intermunicipal significance 38H-309 (R-298 – Shekhovtsovo), 7 km from the nearest railway station Otreshkovo (railway line Kursk – 146 km).

The rural locality is situated 13 km from Kursk Vostochny Airport, 120 km from Belgorod International Airport and 191 km from Voronezh Peter the Great Airport.
