= Emil Magnusson =

Swedish discus thrower

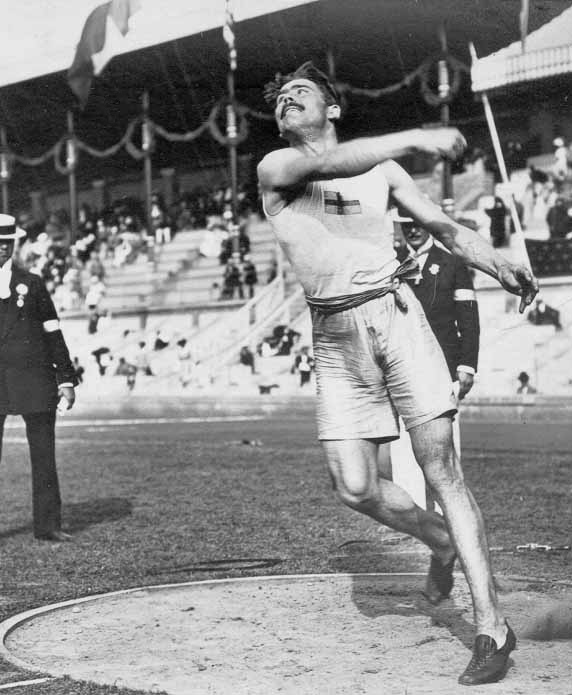
- Emil Magnusson at the 1912 Olympics

Personal information
- Born: 23 November 1887 Genarp, Sweden
- Died: 26 July 1933 (aged 45) Malmö, Sweden
- Height: 1.86 m (6 ft 1 in)
- Weight: 85 kg (187 lb)

Sport
- Sport: Athletics
- Event: Discus throw
- Club: IFK Malmö

Achievements and titles
- Personal best: 43.00 m (1913)
Medal record
Representing Sweden
Olympic Games
Bronze medal – third place	1912 Stockholm	2-handed discus throw

Emil Magnusson (23 November 1887 – 26 July 1933) was a Swedish athlete who won a bronze medal at the 1912 Olympics in the two-handed discus throw. In this event, the final result was a sum of best attempts with a right hand and with a left hand. He finished eighth in the traditional discus throw competition.

Magnusson worked as a policeman.
