= Josef Puhm =

Austrian fencer

Personal information
- Born: 10 March 1877
- Died: July 1961

Sport
- Sport: Fencing

Josef Puhm (10 March 1877 – July 1961) was an Austrian fencer who competed in the 1912 Summer Olympics.

He was part of the Austrian sabre team, but due to being the unused substitute, he was not awarded a (silver) medal. He was eliminated in the first round in the individual foil event. After qualifying for the individual sabre quarterfinals, he did not compete in this stage.
