= Henri Anspach =

Belgian fencer (1882–1979)

Medal record

Men's Fencing

Representing Belgium

Olympic Games
Gold medal – first place	1912 Stockholm	Team epée

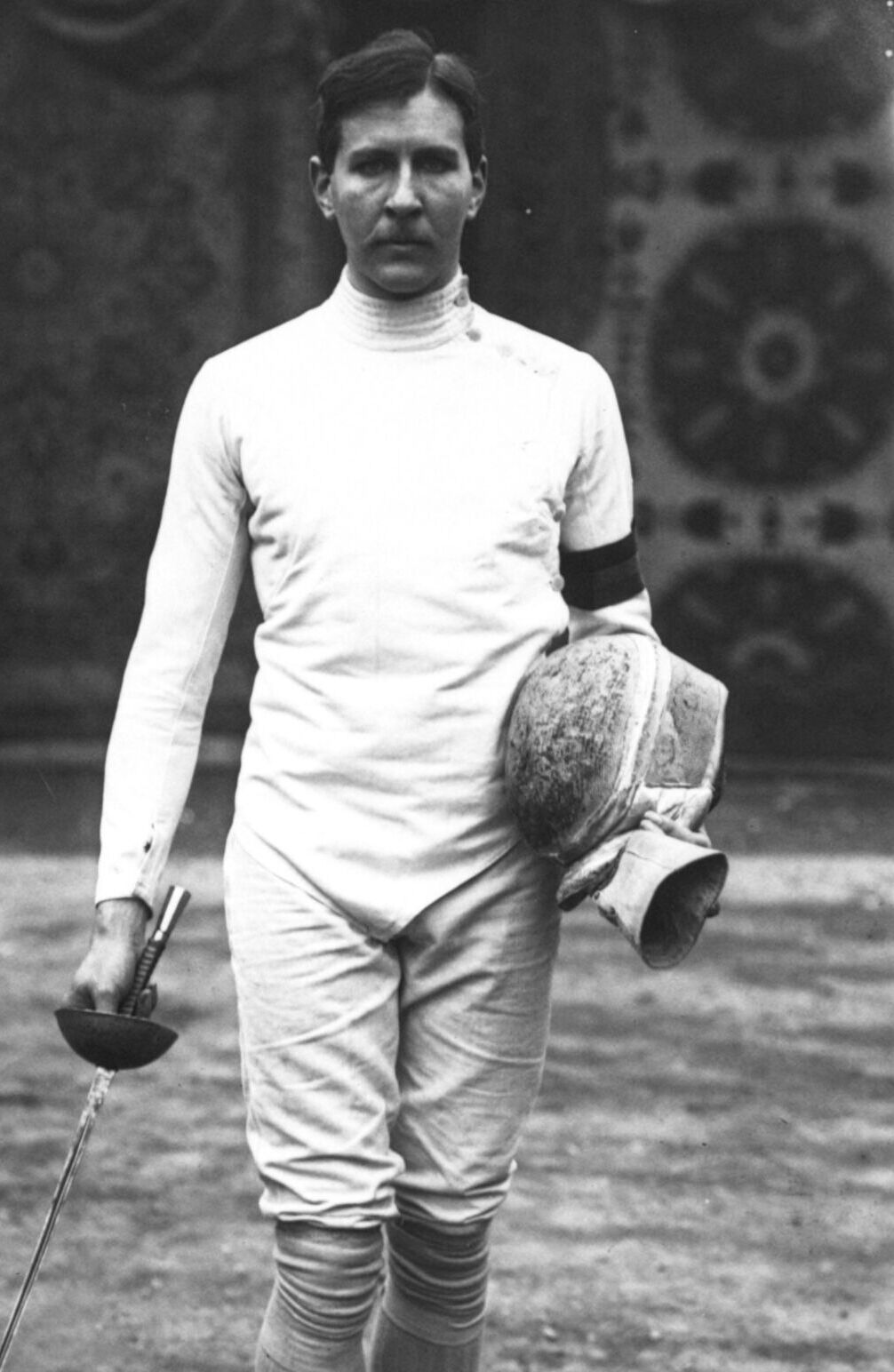
Henri Anspach (1913)

Henri Lucien Ernest Eugène Anspach (10 July 1882 in Belgium – 29 March 1979) was a Belgian épée and foil fencer. He was an Olympic champion in team épée.

== Olympic fencing career ==
Anspach, who was Jewish, was born in Brussels, Belgium. He competed for the Belgian fencing team at the 1912 Summer Olympics. He won a gold medal in the team épée competition, along with teammates were Jacques Ochs, Gaston Salmon, and brother Paul Anspach.

Anspach also competed on the men's sabre team, which came in fifth.

In individual events, Anspach finished 16th in foil and 12th in épée.

== Later life ==
Anspach later became a painter.

== See also ==
- List of select Jewish fencers
- List of Jewish Olympic medalists
