= Genarp =

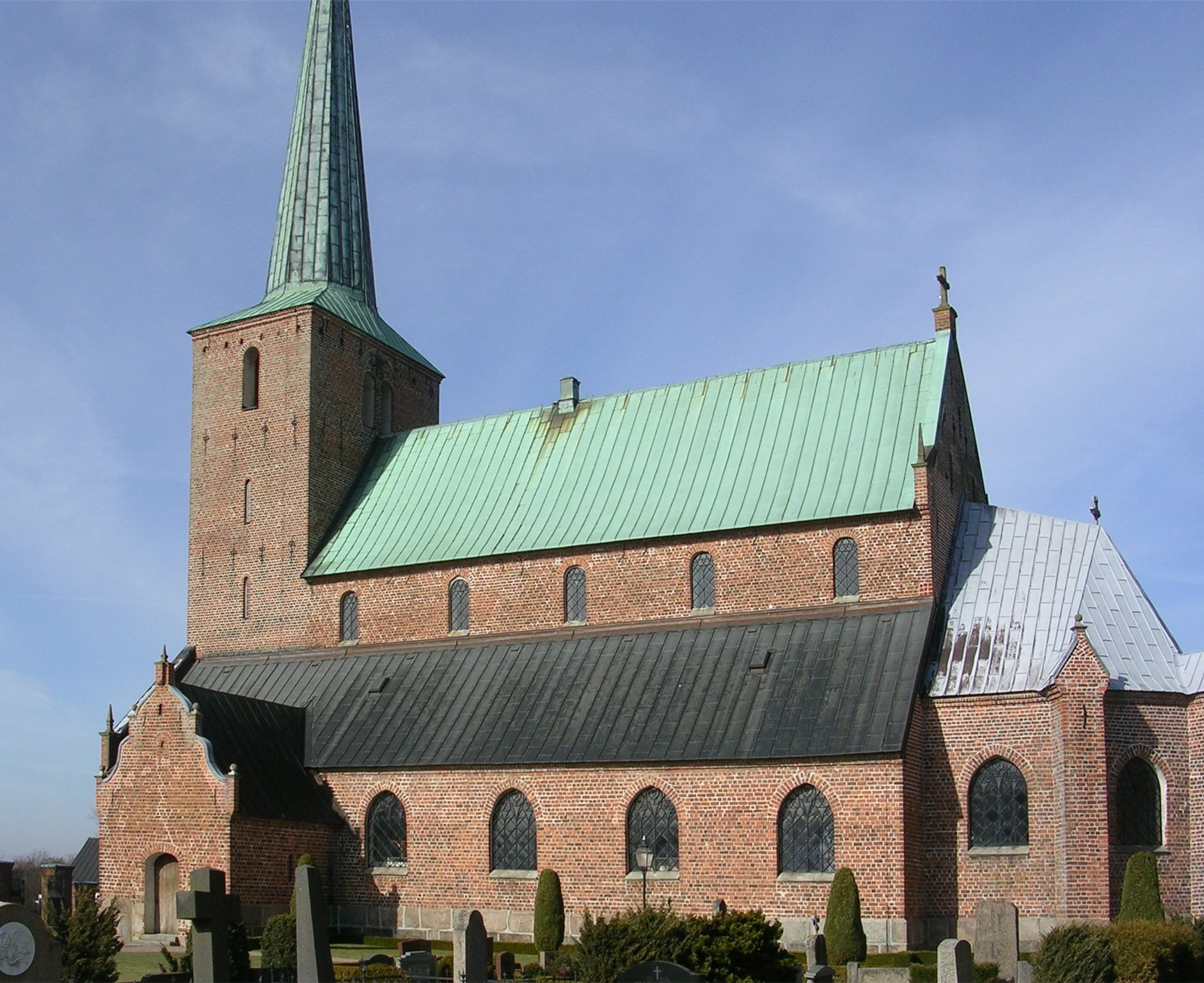
- Genarp Church

- Location within Skåne Location within Sweden
- Coordinates: 55°36′N 13°24′E
- Country: Sweden
- Province: Skåne
- County: Skåne County
- Municipality: Lund Municipality

Area
  - Total: 1.70 km^{2} (0.66 sq mi)

Population (31 December 2010)
  - Total: 2,892
  - Density: 1,699/km^{2} (4,400/sq mi)
- Time zone: UTC+1 (CET)
  - Summer (DST): UTC+2 (CEST)

Genarp is a locality situated in Lund Municipality, Skåne County, Sweden with 2,892 inhabitants in 2010. It is the southernmost urban area in Lund Municipality, located in Bara Hundred.

Most of Genarp consists of residential areas with single-family homes. Genarp Church, which is located in the village, is the only church built in Skåne during the 16th century.

Björnstorp Castle, Toppeladugård Castle and Häckeberga Castle are all located close to Genarp.

Emil Magnussen, a discus thrower, was born here.

== Business sector ==
The largest private employer is the wooden pallets and wooden packaging products manufacturer GLF Genarp AB (formerly Genarps Lådfabrik), which has around 197 employees globally (2024). The business began in 1938 under the name W Hedlund & Co, at that time producing only wooden vegetable crates for nearby growers.
