= Sándor Prokopp =

Hungarian sport shooter

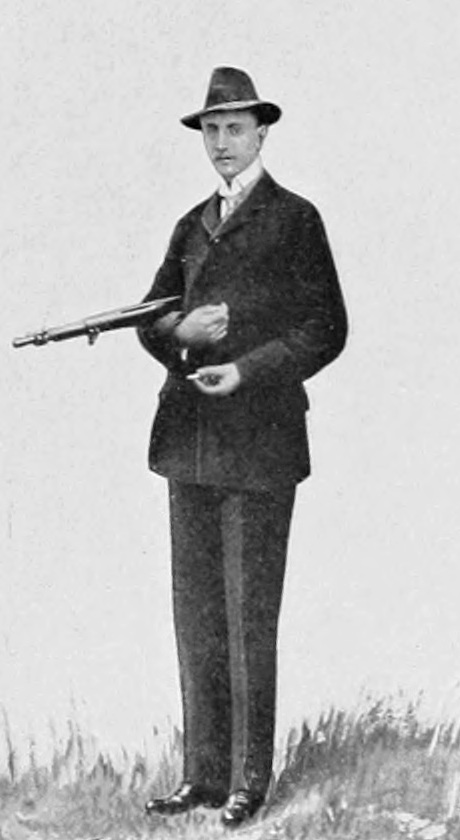
- Prokopp in 1912

Personal information
- Born: 7 May 1887 Kassa, Kingdom of Hungary
- Died: 4 November 1964 (aged 77) Budapest, Hungary

Sport
- Sport: Sports shooting
Medal record
Men's shooting
Representing Hungary
Olympic Games
Gold medal – first place	1912 Stockholm	300m military rifle

Sándor Prokopp (Hungarian: [ˈʃaːndor ˈprokopp]; 7 May 1887 – 4 November 1964) was a Hungarian sport shooter who competed for Hungary at the 1908, 1912 and the 1924 Summer Olympics. He was born in Kassa, Kingdom of Hungary (today Košice, Slovakia) and died in Budapest.

1908 London

In 1908, he finished 43rd in the 300 metre free rifle competition.

1912 Stockholm

Four years later, he won the gold medal in the 300 metre military rifle three positions event.

1924 Paris

In the 1924 Summer Olympics, he participated in the following events:

- 25 metre rapid fire pistol - 53rd place
- 600 metre free rifle - 55th place
- Team free rifle - unplaced (team incomplete)
