= Bertalan Dunay =

Hungarian fencer

Personal information
- Born: 29 October 1877 Szárazberencs, Hungary
- Died: 27 February 1961 (aged 83) Budapest, Hungary

Sport
- Sport: Fencing

Bertalan Dunay (29 October 1877 – 27 February 1961) was a Hungarian fencer. He competed in the individual sabre and foil events at the 1912 Summer Olympics.
