= Jacques Personne =

Jacques Personne (17 October 1816 – 11 December 1880) was a French pharmacist who was innovated several methods in quantitative analytical chemistry, experimental pharmacology and pharmacokinetics. He was among the first to use a colorimetric method to analyzing lead in water.

Personne was born in Saulieu where his parents Léonard and Jeanne Ducharne were bakers and later grocers. His father died in 1837 from an accidental fall into a lime kiln pit. Personne had in the meantime become an assistant to the pharmacist Etienne Vaudrey in 1833. In 1839 he became an intern at a Paris pharmacy and later worked at the Hôpital de la Pitié and in 1841 the Hopital de Lourcine. Here he interacted with Jules Grassi, Henri-Charles Lutz and Antoine Bussy. Personne became an assistant at the Paris School of Pharmacy in 1843. In 1854 he presented a thesis in pharmacy on the history of lupulin. In 1877 he received a doctorate and became an instructor in analytical chemistry. He was involved in examining the safety of red phosphorus over white phosphorus. For his research on chloral hydrate as an anaesthetic he received a Barbier Prize. He believed that it broke down into chloroform by the action of blood. In 1844 he developed colorimetric approach to identifying the quantity of lead in water from different sources. In examining the excretion of quinine in urine he became a pioneer of pharmacokinetics.
