= Alfred Keene =

British fencer (1873–1955)

Personal information
- Full name: Alfred Valentne Keene
- Born: 14 May 1873 Kensington, London, England
- Died: 1 March 1955 (aged 81) Shalford, Surrey, England

Sport
- Sport: Fencing

Alfred Valentine Keene (14 May 1873 – 1 March 1955) was a British fencer. He competed at the 1908 and 1912 Summer Olympics.

== Information ==
Keene was born at Bramley in Surrey where his family owned the manor house and educated at St Paul's School in London. He later lived in Shalford, Surrey. In addition to being an Olympian, Keene was a self-employed stockbroker and served in World War 1. He reached the rank of major and was awarded the Territorial Decoration, the 1914–15 Star and the Victory Medal. Keene came in third in the 1908 British Sabre Championships, along with his brother, Richard. Keene had also reached the final pool of the British Sabre Championships on several occasions. Keen died on 1 March 1955; he was 81.
