= Lajos Werkner =

Hungarian fencer (1883–1943)

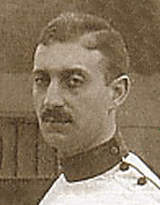

Personal information
- Born: 23 October 1883 Budapest, Kingdom of Hungary
- Died: 12 November 1943 (aged 60) Budapest, Hungary

Sport
- Sport: Fencing
- Event: Sabre
- Club: Nemzeti Vívó Club (NVC), Budapest
Medal record
Representing Hungary
Gold medal – first place	1908 London	Team sabre
Gold medal – first place	1912 Stockholm	Team sabre

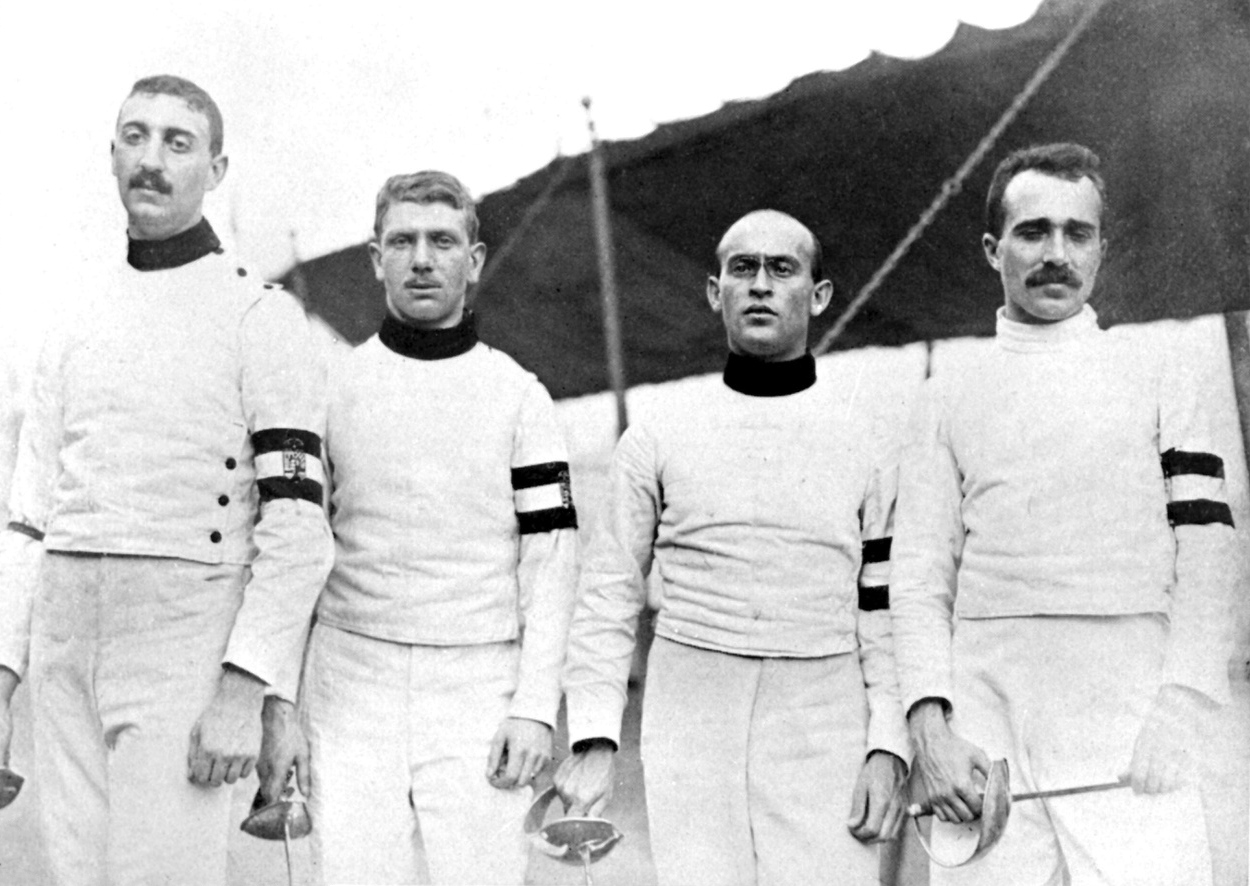
Hungarian sabre team at the 1908 Olympics. Left-right: Lajos Werkner, Oszkár Gerde, Jenő Fuchs, and Péter Tóth

Lajos Werkner (23 October 1883 – 12 November 1943) was a Hungarian Olympic champion sabre fencer.

== Early and personal life ==
Werkner was born in Budapest, Hungary, and was Jewish. Werkner was educated as a mechanical engineer.

== Fencing career ==
Werkner trained at the Nemzeti Vívó Club (NVC) in Budapest.

Werkner won team gold medals at the 1908 Olympics in London at 24 years of age, and at the 1912 Olympics in Stockholm at 28 years of age, placing sixth-seventh individually. He won the Hungarian Championship in sabre in 1912–14.

After retiring from competitions in 1914, Werkner remained active as a sports official.

Werkner died at age 60 in Budapest.

== Hall of Fame ==
In 1999 Werkner was inducted into the International Jewish Sports Hall of Fame.

== See also ==
- List of select Jewish fencers
- List of Jewish Olympic medalists
