= Pavel Filatov =

Ukrainian fencer

Personal information
- Born: 23 December 1887
- Died: 1956 (aged 68–69)

Sport
- Sport: Fencing

Achievements and titles
- Olympic finals: 1912 Summer Olympics

Pavel Filatov (Russian: Павел Филатов, 23 December 1887 – 1956) was a Russian fencer. He competed in the individual sabre event at the 1912 Summer Olympics.
