= Jacques Ochs =

Belgian artist and fencer

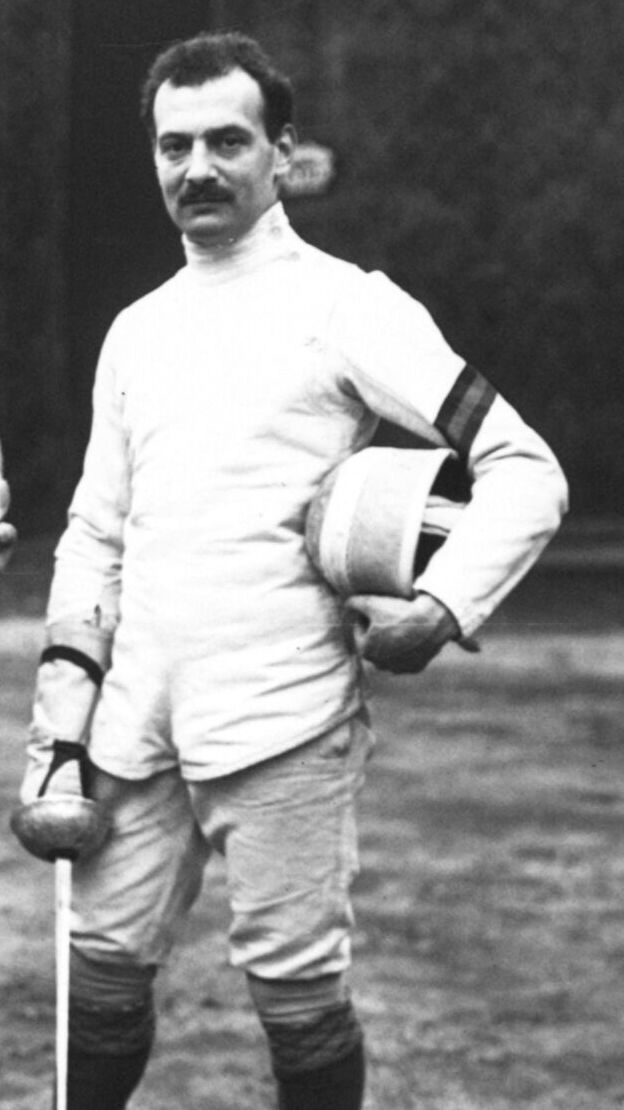
- Jacques Ochs in 1913

Medal record

Men's fencing

Representing Belgium
Gold medal – first place	1912 Stockholm	Team epée

Jacques Ochs (18 February 1883 – 3 April 1971) was a Jewish Belgian artist and Olympic fencer in the épée style (in which he was champion) and competed in the saber, and foil fencing categories.

== Biography ==
Ochs was Jewish, and was born in Nice, France. His family moved to Liège, Belgium, in 1893. He was the Belgian Champion fencer in 1912 and competed for Belgium in the 1912 Stockholm Olympics, winning a gold medal in the team épée event (his teammates included Gaston Salmon). He also competed in three individual events at the same Olympics. In the individual foil and individual épée categories, he reached the 2nd round before being eliminated (he finished 39th in foil, and 29th in épée.) Ochs's final event was individual sabre, but he was eliminated in the 1st round.

Whilst pursuing a career as a professional fencer, he also worked at the newspapers "Newspaper of Liège", "Small Parisian", and "the Belgian Nation", drawing caricatures. His cartoons of personalities on the front page of the weekly Pourquoi Pas? between 1910 and 1971 made him very famous in Belgium.

During the Second World War, he was imprisoned on 17 December in the Fort Breendonk camp. The Germans had a file against him containing, among other things, a caricature that appeared in an old Pourquoi Pas? newspaper and depicted Adolf Hitler with bloody hands. He was detained in the Mechelen barracks and sentenced to death, but the German debacle saved his life. The camp's prisoners suffered from starvation, grass eating, torture, hangings, and shootings. He survived imprisonment.

Ochs died in Liège in 1971, 88 years old.

== See also ==
- List of select Jewish fencers
- List of Jewish Olympic medalists

== Bibliography ==
- Duweiz, Yves (June 2000). "Victor Boin - Jacques Ochs: Deux hommes de leur temps" [Victor Boin - Jacques Ochs: Two Men of Their Time]. Avions: Toute l'Aéronautique et son histoire (in French) (87): 48–53. ISSN 1243-8650.
