= István Prihoda =

Hungarian sports shooter

Personal information
- Born: 15 November 1891 Kolozsvár, Austria-Hungary (now Cluj-Napoca, Romania)
- Died: 22 November 1965 Budapest, Hungary

Sport
- Sport: Sports shooting

István Prihoda (15 November 1891 – 22 November 1965) was a Hungarian artist and sports shooter. He competed in three events at the 1912 Summer Olympics.

He studied at the Hungarian University of Fine Arts , where he received the State Graphic Award for his copper engravings.He was captured in Russia during World War I, but escaped during the February Revolution.

In 1927, he caused a car accident resulting in one death, for which he was sentenced to one year in prison. Beginning in the 1930s, he served as the head of the graphic department of the Hungarian University of Fine Arts. He was noted for making copper engravings depicting prominent Hungarian painters.
