= Gunnar Lindholm =

Swedish fencer

Personal information
- Born: 28 December 1887 Stockholm, Sweden
- Died: 2 September 1972 (aged 84) Santiago, Chile

Sport
- Sport: Fencing

Gunnar Lindholm (28 December 1887 – 2 September 1972) was a Swedish fencer. He competed in the individual sabre event at the 1912 Summer Olympics.
