= Gaston Salmon =

Belgian fencer

Medal record

Men's Fencing

Representing Belgium

Olympic Games
Gold medal – first place	1912 Stockholm	Team epée

Gaston Joseph Clement Marie Salmon (5 March 1878 – 30 April 1918) was a Belgian épée, foil, and sabre fencer. He was Jewish.

== Early and personal life ==
Salmon was born in Marcinelle, in the city of Charleroi, in Belgium, and was Jewish. His parents were Emile Telesphore Joseph and his wife Antoinette Cecile Josephe Marie (nee Crispin). He married Ferdinande Betsy Ermens, and lived in Etterbeek. In World War I he enlisted in the Belgian Army on 14 May 1917. He was killed in an air raid by a German plane at Veurne, Belgium, in April 1918, aged 40, and is buried in the Belgian Military Cemetery in Westvleteren.

== Olympic fencing career ==
Salmon represented Belgium at the 1912 Stockholm Olympics, competing in three events, winning a gold medal in team épée. He also competed in two individual events, but was eliminated in the first round of both the individual foil and individual sabre. The team included artist Jacques Ochs.

== See also ==
- List of select Jewish fencers
- List of Jewish Olympic medalists
