= Henrik Ripszám =

Hungarian long-distance runner

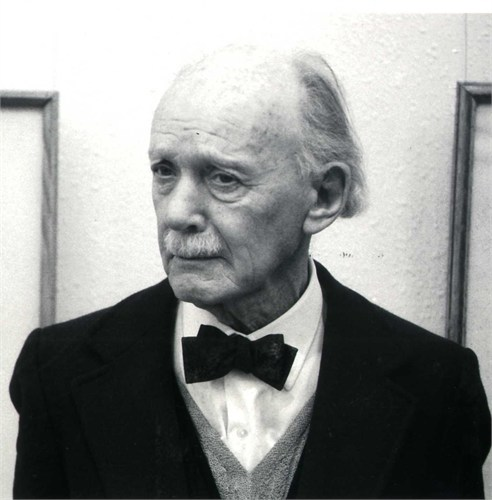
- Ripszám in 1974

Personal information
- Nationality: Hungarian
- Born: 1 February 1889 Németbóly, Hungary
- Died: 9 December 1976 (aged 87) Oakwood

Sport
- Sport: Long-distance running
- Event: Marathon

Henrik Ripszám (1 February 1889 – 9 December 1976) was a Hungarian long-distance runner. He competed in the marathon and the 10km walk at the 1912 Summer Olympics.
