= Josef Zilker =

Austrian cyclist

Personal information
- Born: 19 March 1891 Vienna, Austria

Cycling career
- Sport: Cycling

Josef Zilker (born 19 March 1891, date of death unknown) was an Austrian cyclist. He competed in two events at the 1912 Summer Olympics.
