= Dirk Scalongne =

Dutch fencer (1879–1973)

Personal information
- Born: 12 December 1879 Amsterdam, Netherlands
- Died: 1 April 1973 (aged 93) Amstelveen, Netherlands

Sport
- Sport: Fencing
Medal record
Men's fencing
Representing Netherlands
Olympic Games
Bronze medal – third place	1912 Stockholm	Sabre, team

Dirk Scalongne (12 December 1879 – 1 April 1973) was a Dutch Schout-bij-nacht and fencer. He won a bronze medal in the team sabre event at the 1912 Summer Olympics. Between 29 April 1929 and 1 May 1931 he served as commander of the Royal Netherlands Navy Submarine Service.

== Early life ==
Dirk Scalongne was born 12 December 1879 in Amsterdam.

== Military career ==
=== Early career ===
In 1907 Scalongne was part of the first crew of HNLMS O 1 where he served at the time as reserve commander. This crew were the first submariners of the Royal Netherlands Navy.

=== Interwar Period ===
In 1928 Scalongne was part of a supervisory committee that observed the testing of a new bubble capture system that Inkavos had developed to eliminate bubbles when firing torpedoes from torpedo tubes. During his time on the committee he observed the trials aboard the HNLMS O 6 and contributed to the final report in which it was concluded that the system did not meet expectations. That same year on 13 July 1928 he was appointed commander of the submarine station in Soerabaja. Scalongne remained commander of this station till 27 February 1929. Shortly after, he was appointed on 29 April 1929 as commander of the Royal Netherlands Navy Submarine Service.

== Personal life ==
Scalongne married Antoinette Catherine van Loenen on 5 October 1905 in the Hague, the Netherlands. On 3 June 1926 this marriage was dissolved.

=== Death ===
Dirk Scalongne died on 1 April 1973 in Amstelveen, the Netherlands.
