= Hanny Kellner =

Austrian diver

Hanny Kellner (October 31, 1892 – January 2, 1976) was an Austrian diver who competed in the 1912 Summer Olympics. She was born in Vienna. In 1912 she was eliminated in the first round of the 10 metre platform event. She did not finish the competition.
