= Rásonysápberencs =

- Location of Borsod-Abaúj-Zemplén county in Hungary

- Location of Rásonysápberencs
- Coordinates: 48.30637°N 20.99267°E
- Country: Hungary
- County: Borsod-Abaúj-Zemplén

Area
  - Total: 9.12 km^{2} (3.52 sq mi)

Population (2004)
  - Total: 579
  - Density: 63.48/km^{2} (164.4/sq mi)
- Time zone: UTC+1 (CET)
  - Summer (DST): UTC+2 (CEST)
- Postal code: 3833
- Area code: 46

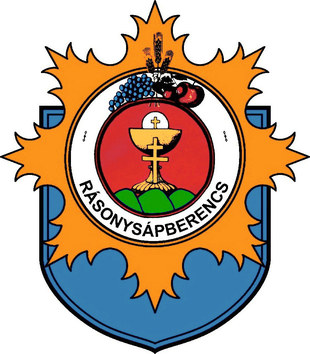
Coat of arms of Rásonysápberencs.

Rásonysápberencs is a village in Borsod-Abaúj-Zemplén county, Hungary.

== History ==
Rásonysápberencs was created on 1 January 1938 by the unification of three villages (Abaújsáp, Rásony and Szárazberencs).
