= Károly Kobulszky =

Hungarian discus thrower

Personal information
- Nationality: Hungarian
- Born: 28 September 1887 Eperjes, Sáros County, Kingdom of Hungary, Austria-Hungary (now Prešov, Slovakia)
- Died: 31 December 1970 (aged 83) Budapest, Hungary
- Resting place: Farkasréti Cemetery
- Occupation: Postal clerk

Sport
- Country: Hungary
- Sport: Discus throw, Shot put
- Club: Eperjesi TVE (1904–10); Budapesti Postás SE (1910–17); Magyar AC (1917–23)

Achievements and titles
- Personal best: Discus throw – 42.67 m (1921)
- Updated on 7 November 2013

Károly Kobulszky (Hungarian pronunciation: [ˈkaːroj ˈkobulski]; Slovak: Karol Kobulszky; 28 September 1887 – 31 December 1970) was a Hungarian track and field athlete, footballer and postal clerk.

== Career ==
Born in Eperjes (Prešov), Kobulszky began his career in 1904 at a local club Eperjesi Torna és Vívó Egylet, where he remained until 1910. Generally competing in throwing events (discus throw, shot put), he was also a member of the Eperjesi TVE football team, with them he won the first edition of the Northern District Championship of the Hungarian league (1907–08).

In 1910 Kobulszky switched to Budapesti Postás SE, the club of the Hungarian Post, in their color he won his first Hungarian Athletics Championships title in the discus throw event. In 1912 he made it to the Olympic Games, where he finished nineteenth in the discus throw competition and eighteenth in the two handed discus throw event.

From 1917 to 1923, Kobulszky competed for Magyar AC, during which period he achieved his biggest results by winning two Hungarian Athletics Championships titles in the discus throw (1919, 1921) and being a member of both the discus throw and shot put team of Magyar AC that won the gold medal at the 1919 Hungarian Athletics Championships.

Kobulszky died in Budapest and was buried at the Farkasréti Cemetery.
