= Josef Wastl =

Austrian anthropologist

Personal information
- Born: 4 December 1892 Vienna, Austria-Hungary
- Died: 11 October 1968 (aged 75)

Sport
- Sport: Swimming

Josef Wastl (4 December 1892 – 11 October 1968) was an Austrian Anthropologist and Ethnologist who served as the Director of the Anthropological Department at the Natural History Museum in Vienna from 1942 to 1945. He was also a breaststroke swimmer. He competed in two events at the 1912 Summer Olympics.

Wastl joined the National Socialist German Workers' Party (NSDAP) in 1932 and founded an illegal cell ('Betriebszelle') for the Party in the Natural History Museum that same year. Wastl started work at the Anthropological Department in 1935, taking over direction of the department from Viktor Lebzelter following his death in 1936, before being appointed Head of the department in 1938 and later Director. Wastl had a keen interest in 'racial science', described as "Vienna's foremost racial scientist". While at the Natural History Museum, Wastl organised an exhibition on “The Physical and Mental Appearance of the Jews” (Das körperliche und seelische Erscheinungsbild der Juden), which promulgated Nazi racist and antisemitic ideology. He also purchased skulls and death masks of Polish concentration camp victims, as well as 220 skeletons from the exhumation of the Währing Jewish Cemetery in Vienna from 1942 to 1943. Alongside his activities for the museum, Wastl served as an 'anthropological expert' for the Reich Office for Genealogical Research (Reichsstelle für Sippenforschung) in Berlin, the Croatian State Family Office in Zagreb, and the Ostmark regional and district courts to prove 'German-blooded' ancestry. Wastl was suspended from his role at the Natural History Museum in 1945 due to his involvement during the Nazi period, and was officially sent into early retirement in 1948. He remained Vice President of the Anthropological Society in Vienna and continued to work as a court expert in Anthropology until his death.
