= Alois Wacha =

Austrian cyclist

Personal information
- Born: 10 June 1886 Vienna, Austria-Hungary
- Died: 15 June 1946 (aged 60) Vienna, Austria

Cycling career
- Sport: Cycling

Alois Wacha (10 June 1886 – 15 June 1946) was an Austrian cyclist. He competed in two events at the 1912 Summer Olympics.
