= Anatoly Timofeyev =

Russian fencer

Personal information
- Born: 19 October 1887 1st Krasnikovo
- Died: 17 August 1985 (aged 97)

Sport
- Sport: Fencing

Anatoly Timofeyev (Russian: Анатолий Тимофеев, 19 October 1887 – 17 August 1985) was a Russian fencer. He competed in the individual and team sabre events at the 1912 Summer Olympics.
