= George van Rossem =

Dutch fencer (1882–1955)

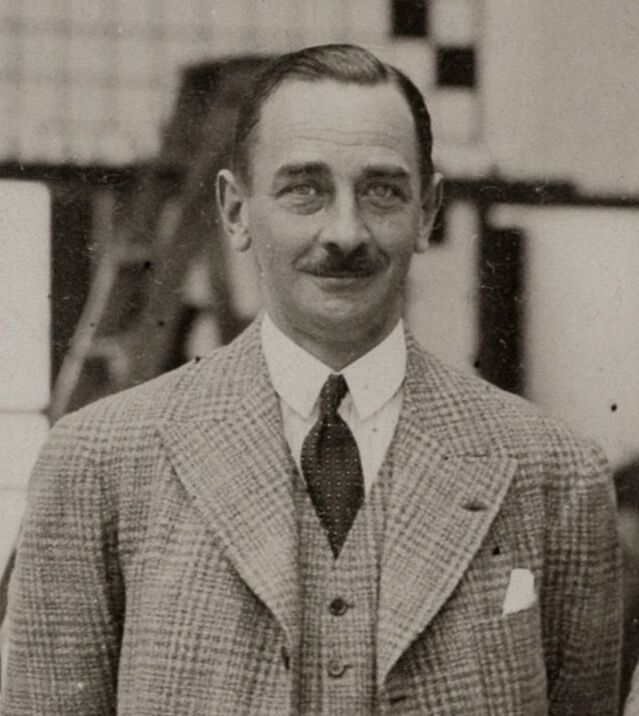
- George van Rossem (1928)

Personal information
- Born: 30 May 1882 The Hague, Netherlands
- Died: 14 January 1955 (aged 72) Wassenaar, Netherlands

Sport
- Sport: Fencing
Medal record
Men's fencing
Representing Netherlands
Intercalated Games
Silver medal – second place	1906 Athens	Three Hits
Bronze medal – third place	1906 Athens	Sabre, Team
Olympic Games
Bronze medal – third place	1912 Stockholm	Épée, Team
Bronze medal – third place	1912 Stockholm	Sabre, Team

George van Rossem (30 May 1882 – 14 January 1955) was a Dutch fencer. He won a silver and three bronze medals. He was the President of the Fédération Internationale d'Escrime from 1925 to 1928. He was the secretary general of the executive committee of the Netherlands Olympic Committee (Committee 1928) which organized the 1928 Summer Olympics in Amsterdam.
