= Robert Rammer =

Austrian cyclist

Personal information
- Born: 14 April 1890 Vienna, Austria

Cycling career
- Sport: Cycling

Robert Rammer (born 14 April 1890, date of death unknown) was an Austrian road racing cyclist who competed in the 1912 Summer Olympics. He was born in Vienna.

In 1912, he was a member of the Austrian cycling team, which finished seventh in the team time trial event. In the individual time trial competition he finished 23rd.
