= István Müller =

Hungarian cyclist

Personal information
- Born: 27 May 1883 Budapest, Hungary

Cycling career
- Sport: Cycling

István Müller (born 27 May 1883, date of death unknown) was a Hungarian cyclist. He competed in two events at the 1912 Summer Olympics.
