= Harry Butterworth =

British fencer

Personal information
- Born: 22 November 1867 Dunedin, New Zealand
- Died: 30 November 1954 (aged 87) Dunedin, New Zealand

Sport
- Sport: Fencing

Harry Butterworth (22 November 1867 – 30 November 1954) was a British fencer. He competed in the individual and team sabre events at the 1912 Summer Olympics in Stockholm.

He was also the coach of Swedish football club Hammarby IF in 1920.
