= Franz Dereani =

Austrian fencer

Personal information
- Born: 10 September 1875
- Died: 1917 (aged 41–42)

Sport
- Sport: Fencing

Franz Dereani (10 September 1875 – 1917) was an Austrian fencer. He competed in the individual foil and sabre events at the 1912 Summer Olympics.
