= Alfred Ridley-Martin =

British fencer (1881–1970)

Personal information
- Born: 9 May 1881 Lewisham, London, England
- Died: 6 May 1970 (aged 88) Purley, London, England

Sport
- Sport: Fencing

Alfred Ridley-Martin (9 May 1881 – 6 May 1970) was a British fencer. He competed at the 1912 and 1920 Summer Olympics. He was twice British fencing champion, winning the sabre title at the British Fencing Championships in 1910 and 1913.
