= Béla Zulawszky =

Slovak-Hungarian fencer (1869–1914)

Béla Zulawszky Vojtech Zulawszky
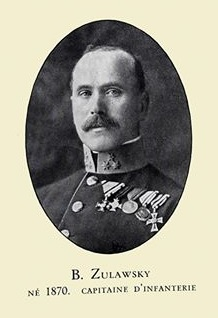

Personal information
- Nationality: Slovak
- Born: 23 October 1869 Trebišov, Austria-Hungary (today Slovakia)
- Died: 27 October 1914 (aged 45) Sarajevo, Bosnia and Herzegovina

Sport
- Sport: Fencing
- Event(s): Sabre; Épée; Foil
- Club: Magyar AC
Medal record
Men's fencing
Representing Hungary
Olympic Games
Silver medal – second place	1908 London	Sabre, individual

Béla Zulawszky (Slovak: Vojtech Zulawszky) (23 October 1869 – 27 October 1914) was a Slovak-Hungarian fencer. He won a silver medal in the individual sabre event at the 1908 Summer Olympics. He was killed in action during World War I.

== Biography ==
Béla Zulawszky graduated from university in 1897 and then became a gymnastics teacher at the military academy in Koszeg, Hungary. He was a member of the Magyar Atlétikai Club in Budapest and also taught fencing. Zulawszky competed at both the 1908 and 1912 Olympics in all three weapons, winning silver in individual sabre in 1908. He joined the Hungarian Army in 1912 as an officer, eventually becoming a major. He was killed in Sarajevo in the early days of World War I, in October 1914.

== See also ==
- List of Olympians killed in World War I
