= Tibor Fazekas =

Hungarian water polo player

Personal information
- Born: 9 June 1892 Budapest, Austria-Hungary
- Died: 11 May 1982 (aged 89) Budapest, Hungary

Sport
- Sport: Water polo

Tibor Fazekas (Note: He is also known as Tibor Friedmann) (9 June 1892 – 11 May 1982) was a Hungarian water polo player who had a total of 3 Olympic appearances. He competed in the 1912 Summer Olympics and in the 1924 Summer Olympics. He was born and died in Budapest.
