= Albert Bogen =

Austrian fencer

Olympic medal record

Representing Austria-Hungary

Men's Fencing
Silver medal – second place	1912 Stockholm	Team sabre

Albert Bogen (born Albert Bógathy; October 31, 1882 – July 14, 1961) was a fencer who competed for Austria-Hungary at the 1912 Summer Olympics and for Hungary at the 1928 Summer Olympics.

Bogen was Jewish and was born in Kikinda, Austria-Hungary. His daughter was Hungarian fencer Erna Bogen-Bogáti, who won a bronze medal in women's individual foil at the 1932 Summer Olympics and was the wife of Hungarian fencer Aladár Gerevich who won gold medals in sabre in six Olympics and mother of Olympic medalist Pál Gerevich who won two Olympic bronze medals in team sabre. He was part of the Austrian sabre team, which won the silver medal. After qualifying for the individual sabre quarterfinals, he did not compete in this stage.

== See also ==
- List of select Jewish fencers
- List of Jewish Olympic medalists
