= Andreas Suttner =

Austrian fencer (1876–1953)

Personal information
- Born: 24 September 1876
- Died: 5 July 1953 (aged 76)

Fencing career
- Sport: Fencing
- Country: Austrian Empire
- Weapon: Sabre, Foil
Medal record
Representing Austrian Empire
Men's fencing
Silver medal – second place	1912 Stockholm	Team sabre

Andreas Suttner (24 September 1876 – 5 July 1953) was an Austrian fencer who competed in the 1912 Summer Olympics.

He was part of the Austrian sabre team, which won the silver medal. He was eliminated during the first round in the individual foil event.
