= William Marsh (fencer) =

British fencer (1877–1959)

Personal information
- Born: 29 March 1877 Twyford, Hampshire, England
- Died: 12 February 1959 (aged 81) Hastings, East Sussex, England

Sport
- Sport: Fencing

William Walter Marsh (29 March 1877 – 12 February 1959) was a British fencer. He competed at four Olympic Games. He was twice British fencing champion, winning the sabre title at the British Fencing Championships in 1908 and 1909.
