= Apollon Guiber von Greifenfels =

Russian fencer

Personal information
- Born: 31 May 1887 Kyiv, Russian Empire

Sport
- Sport: Fencing

Apollon Guiber von Greifenfels (born 31 May 1887, died after July 1920) was a fencer from Kyiv who represented the Russian Empire. He competed in the individual and team sabre events at the 1912 Summer Olympics.
