= Jenő Fuchs =

Hungarian fencer (1882–1955)

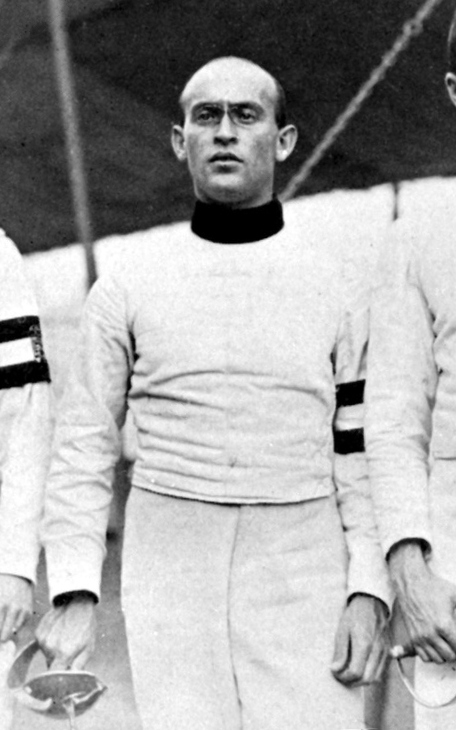
- Fuchs at the 1908 Olympics

Personal information
- Born: 29 October 1882 Budapest, Kingdom of Hungary
- Died: 14 March 1955 (aged 72) Budapest, Hungary

Sport
- Sport: Fencing
- Event: Sabre
- Club: Edison KE
- Coached by: Gyula Rákossy
Medal record
Representing Hungary
Olympic Games
| Gold medal – first place | 1908 London | Individual sabre |
| Gold medal – first place | 1908 London | Team sabre |
| Gold medal – first place | 1912 Stockholm | Individual sabre |
| Gold medal – first place | 1912 Stockholm | Team sabre |

Jenő Fuchs (also known as Jenő Fekete; 29 October 1882 – 14 March 1955) was a Hungarian sabre fencer. He competed at the 1908 and 1912 Olympics and won both the individual and team events at both Games. He missed the 1920 Olympics, where Hungary was not allowed to compete, and qualified for the 1924 Games but left his place in the team to younger fencers. In 1982 he was inducted into the International Jewish Sports Hall of Fame.

Fuchs studied law at the University of Budapest, defended a PhD in 1911, and became a lawyer. Apart from fencing and law, he was a top-ranked rower and bobsledder in Hungary and worked with the Budapest stock market.

== See also ==
- List of select Jewish fencers
- List of Jewish Olympic medalists
