= Friedrich Schwarz =

German fencer

Personal information
- Born: 1880
- Died: Unknown

Sport
- Sport: Fencing

Friedrich Schwarz (born 1880, date of death unknown) was a German fencer. He competed in the individual and team épée and sabre events at the 1912 Summer Olympics. A year prior to the Olympics, Schwarz was a co-founder of the German Fencing Association.
