= Giovanni Benfratello =

Italian fencer (1883–1966)

Personal information
- Born: 3 January 1883 Palermo, Italy
- Died: 9 February 1966 (aged 83) Palermo, Italy

Sport
- Sport: Fencing

Giovanni Benfratello (3 January 1883 – 9 February 1966) was an Italian fencer. He competed in the individual and team sabre events at the 1912 Summer Olympics.
