= Carl-Gustaf Klerck =

Swedish fencer

Personal information
- Born: 28 December 1885 Skåne, Sweden
- Died: 29 March 1976 (aged 90) Lund, Sweden

Sport
- Sport: Fencing

Carl-Gustaf Klerck (28 December 1885 – 29 March 1976) was a Swedish fencer. He competed in the individual and team sabre events at the 1912 Summer Olympics.
