= Helge Werner =

Swedish fencer

Personal information
- Born: 23 October 1883 Säffle, Sweden
- Died: 6 February 1953 (aged 69) Solna, Sweden

Sport
- Sport: Fencing
- Club: I18 IF

Helge Werner (23 October 1883 – 6 February 1953) was a Swedish fencer. He competed in the individual and team sabre events at the 1912 Summer Olympics in Stockholm, Sweden.

Werner was born in Säffle, represented I18 IF of Västerås, and died in Solna.
