= Béla Békessy =

Hungarian fencer (1875–1916)

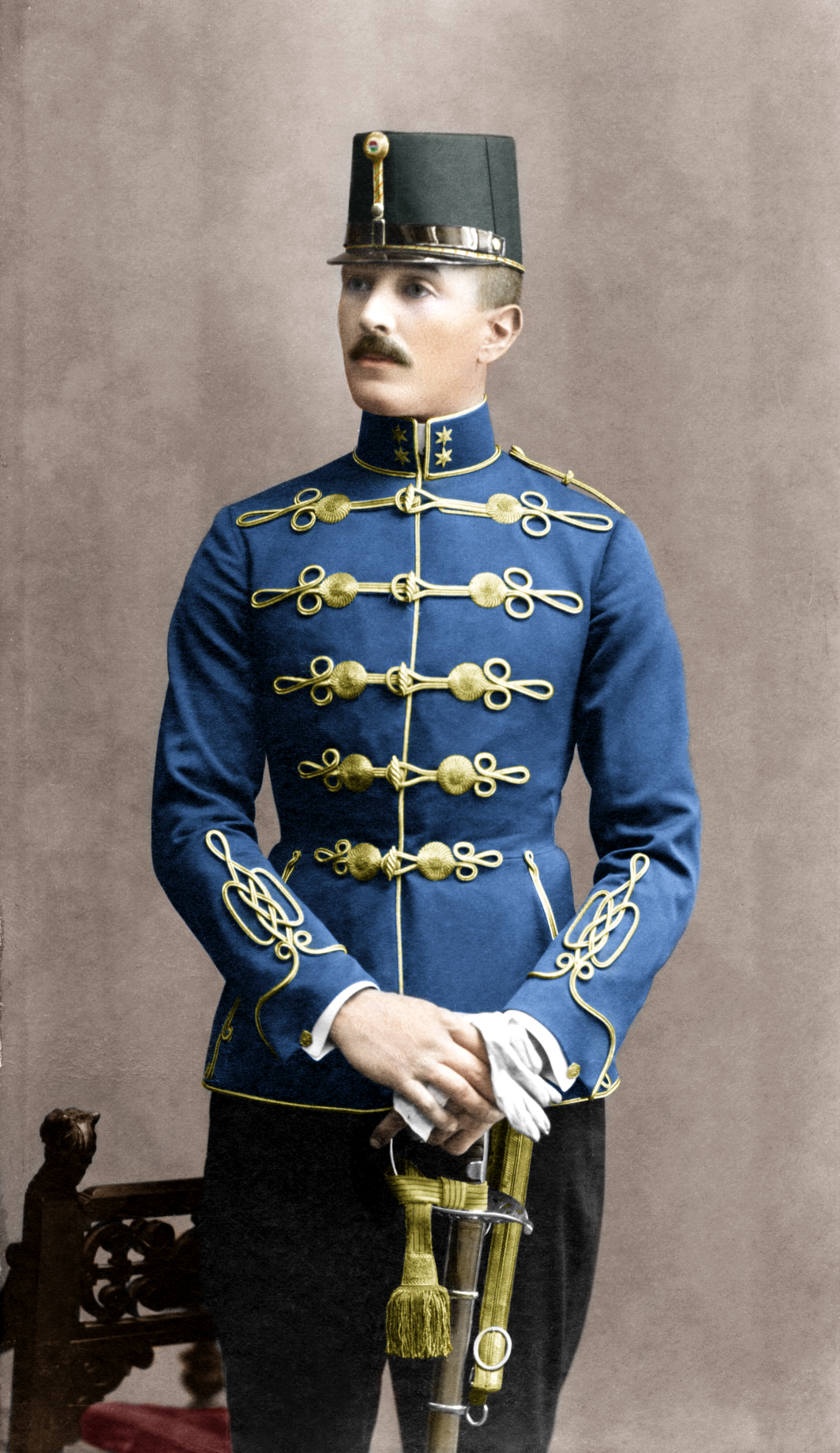

Personal information
- Born: 16 November 1875 Debrecen, Austria-Hungary
- Died: 6 July 1916 (aged 40) Volyn, present-day Ukraine

Sport
- Sport: Fencing
Medal record
Men's fencing
Representing Hungary
Olympic Games
Silver medal – second place	1912 Stockholm	Sabre, Individual

Béla Békessy (16 November 1875 – 6 July 1916) was a Hungarian épée, foil and sabre fencer. He won a silver medal in the individual sabre event at the 1912 Summer Olympics. He was killed in action during World War I.

== See also ==
- List of Olympians killed in World War I
