= Friedrich Golling =

Austrian fencer

Olympic medal record

Representing Austrian Empire

Men's Fencing
Silver medal – second place	1912 Stockholm	Team sabre

Friedrich Golling (11 November 1883 – 11 October 1974) was an Austrian fencer who competed in the 1912 Summer Olympics.

Golling was part of the Austrian sabre team, which won the silver medal. In the individual foil event he was eliminated in the quarterfinals and in the individual sabre event he was eliminated in the first round.
