= László Berti =

Hungarian fencer (1875–1952)

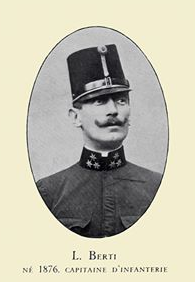

Personal information
- Born: 24 June 1875 Budapest, Hungary
- Died: 23 June 1952 (aged 76) Budapest, Hungary

Sport
- Sport: Fencing
Medal record
Men's fencing
Representing Hungary
Olympic Games
Gold medal – first place	1912 Stockholm	Sabre, team
Silver medal – second place	1924 Paris	Sabre, team
Bronze medal – third place	1924 Paris	Foil, team

László Berti (24 June 1875 – 23 June 1952) was a Hungarian fencer. He won a gold medal at the 1912 Summer Olympics and a silver and bronze at the 1924 Summer Olympics.
