= Ernest zu Hohenlohe =

Austrian fencer

Personal information
- Born: 5 August 1891 Ratibor, Silesia, Germany
- Died: 17 June 1947 (aged 55) Lisbon, Portugal

Sport
- Sport: Fencing

Ernest zu Hohenlohe (5 August 1891 – 17 June 1947) was an Austrian fencer. He competed in the individual sabre event at the 1912 Summer Olympics. Ernest was a member of the Hohenlohe dynasty.

== See also ==
- List of royal Olympians
