= Hendrik de Iongh =

Dutch fencer (1877–1962)

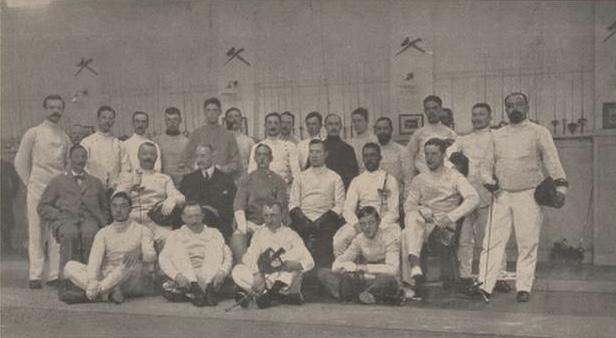
- Van Geuns in 1912

Personal information
- Born: 4 August 1877 Dordrecht, Netherlands
- Died: 9 August 1962 (aged 85) The Hague, Netherlands

Sport
- Sport: Fencing
Medal record
Men's fencing
Representing Netherlands
Olympic Games
Bronze medal – third place	1912 Stockholm	Sabre, team

Hendrik de Iongh (4 August 1877 – 9 August 1962) was a Dutch fencer. He won a bronze medal in the team sabre event at the 1912 Summer Olympics.
