= Robert Hennet =

Belgian fencer

Personal information
- Born: 22 January 1886 Schaerbeek, Belgium
- Died: 2 July 1957 (aged 71) Saint-Gilles, Belgium

Sport
- Sport: Fencing
Medal record
Men's fencing
Representing Belgium
Olympic Games
Gold medal – first place	1912 Stockholm	Épée, Team

Robert Joseph Charles Hennet (22 January 1886 – 2 July 1957) was a Belgian fencer. He won a gold medal in the team épée event at the 1912 Summer Olympics.
