= Karl Münich =

Austrian fencer

Personal information
- Born: 27 August 1848

Sport
- Sport: Fencing

Achievements and titles
- Olympic finals: 1912 Summer Olympics

Karl Münich (born 27 August 1848, date of death unknown) was an Austrian fencer. He competed in the individual sabre event at the 1912 Summer Olympics in Stockholm.
