= Reinhold Trampler =

Austrian fencer

Olympic medal record

Representing Austrian Empire

Men's fencing
Silver medal – second place	1912 Stockholm	Team sabre

Reinhold Trampler (26 July 1877 – 21 December 1964) was an Austrian fencer who competed in the 1912 Summer Olympics. He was part of the Austrian sabre team, which won the silver medal. In the individual foil event he was eliminated in the first round.
