= Aleksandr Mordovin =

Russian fencer

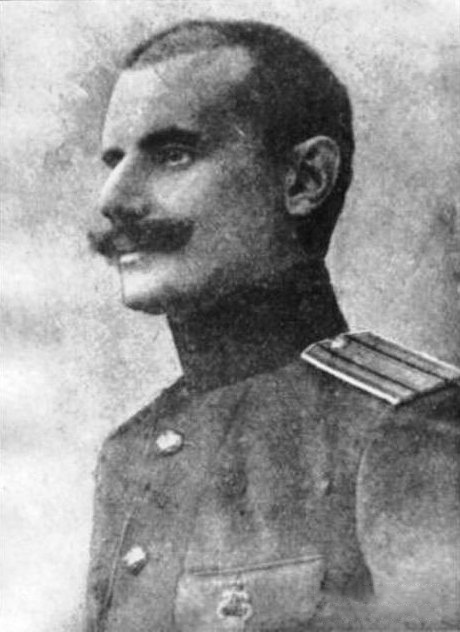

Personal information
- Born: 3 February 1873
- Died: 31 March 1938 (aged 65)

Sport
- Sport: Fencing

Aleksandr Mordovin (Russian: Александр Павлович Мордовин; 3 February 1873 – 31 March 1938) was a fencer from the Russian Empire. He competed in three events at the 1912 Summer Olympics.
