= Jenő Hégner-Tóth =

Hungarian water polo player

Personal information
- Born: 17 April 1894; Budapest, Austria-Hungary
- Died: 10 June 1915 (aged 21); Humenné, Czechoslovakia

Sport
- Sport: Water polo

Jenő Hégner-Tóth (17 April 1894 – 10 June 1915) was a Hungarian water polo player who competed in the 1912 Summer Olympics. He was part of the Hungarian team in the 1912 tournament. He was killed in action in Humenné during World War I.
