= Rudolf Cvetko =

Slovene fencer

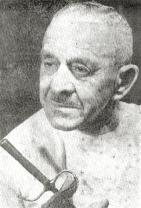
- Rudolf Cvetko

Personal information
- Born: November 17, 1880 Senosetsch, Austro-Hungarian Empire (now Slovenia)
- Died: December 15, 1977 (aged 97) Ljubljana, SR Slovenia, Yugoslavia
Medal record
Representing Austrian Empire
Men's Fencing
Silver medal – second place	1912 Stockholm	Team sabre

Rudolf Cvetko (November 17, 1880 – December 15, 1977) was a Slovene fencer who was the first Slovene winner of an Olympic medal. A competitor at the 1912 Summer Olympics in Stockholm, Sweden, Cvetko was part of the Austrian sabre team, which won the silver medal, though in the individual foil event he was eliminated in the first round.

Cvetko was born in Senožeče to a Slovene gendarme Janez Cvetko. He studied in Ljubljana and in Trieste. He served in the Austro-Hungarian Army between 1900 and 1913, after which he worked as a physical education teacher in the Slovene-language high school in Gorizia. After WWI, he moved to the Kingdom of Serbs, Croats and Slovenes.
