= Edward Brookfield =

British fencer (1880–1965)

Personal information
- Born: 24 June 1880
- Died: 8 February 1965 (aged 84) Chelsea, London, England

Sport
- Sport: Fencing

Edward Brookfield (24 June 1880 – 8 February 1965) was a British fencer. He competed at four Olympic Games.
