= Julius Lichtenfels =

German fencer

Personal information
- Born: 19 May 1884
- Died: 29 June 1968 (aged 84)

Sport
- Sport: Fencing

Julius Lichtenfels (19 May 1884 – 29 June 1968) was a German fencer. He competed at the 1908 and 1912 Summer Olympics.
