= Dezső Földes =

Hungarian fencer (1880–1950)

Medal record

Men's fencing

Representing Hungary

Olympic Games
Gold medal – first place	1908 London	Team sabre
Gold medal – first place	1912 Stockholm	Team sabre

Dezso Foldes

Dezső Földes (born Dezső Grünfeld; 30 December 1880 in Miskolc, Kingdom of Hungary – 27 March 1950 in Cleveland, United States) was a Hungarian saber fencer.

== Olympics ==
Földes won gold medals in team saber at the 1908 Summer Olympics in London and at the 1912 Summer Olympics in Stockholm.

== Life ==
He was Jewish, and was born into a Hungarian Jewish family in Miskolc, Kingdom of Hungary. Földes moved to the United States in 1912, and set up a hospital clinic for the poor in Cleveland, where he died in 1950.

== See also ==
- List of select Jewish fencers
- List of Jewish Olympic medalists
