= Ervin Mészáros =

Hungarian fencer (1877–1940)

Personal information
- Born: 2 April 1877 Budapest, Hungary
- Died: 21 May 1940 (aged 63) Budapest, Hungary

Sport
- Sport: Fencing
Medal record
Men's fencing
Representing Hungary
Olympic Games
Gold medal – first place	1912 Stockholm	Sabre, Team
Bronze medal – third place	1912 Stockholm	Sabre, Individual

Ervin Mészáros (2 April 1877 – 21 May 1940) was a Hungarian fencer. He won a gold and a bronze medal at the 1912 Summer Olympics.
