= Richard Verderber =

Austrian fencer

- Born: January 23, 1884; Gottschee, Duchy of Carniola, Austria-Hungary
- Died: September 8, 1955 (aged 71); Vienna, Austria
- Military career
- Allegiance: Austrian Empire; Austria-Hungary
- Branch: Army
- Service years: 1902 – 1934
- Rank: Oberst
- Other work: Fencing Champion

Olympic medal record

Representing Austrian Empire

Men's Fencing
Silver medal – second place	1912 Stockholm	Team sabre
Bronze medal – third place	1912 Stockholm	foil

Richard Verderber (January 23, 1884 – September 8, 1955) was an Austrian fencer who competed in the 1912 Summer Olympics.

He was part of the Austrian sabre team, which won the silver medal. He won the bronze medal in the individual foil event.

== Military ranks ==
- Kadett-Offiziersstellvertreter: 1 September 1902
- Leutnant: 1 November 1903
- Hauptmann: 1 January 1915
- Major: 1 January 1920
- Oberstlieutenant: January 1929
- Oberst: 15 March 1934

== Decorations and honors ==
- Austrian Merit Order in Bronze and Silver
- Order of the Iron Crown
- Military Merit Cross
- Karl Troop Cross
