= Carl Personne =

Swedish fencer

Personal information
- Born: Carl Birger Personne; 11 May 1888 Väderstad, Sweden
- Died: 4 October 1976 (aged 88) Stockholm, Sweden

Sport
- Sport: Fencing

Carl Personne (11 May 1888 – 4 October 1976) was a Swedish foil and sabre fencer. He competed in three events at the 1912 Summer Olympics.
