= Oszkár Gerde =

Hungarian fencer (1883–1944)

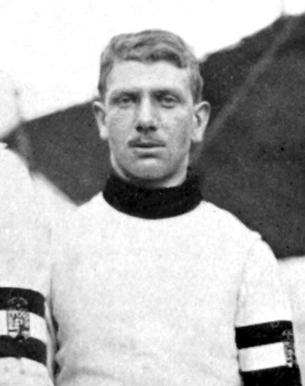
- Gerde at the 1908 Olympics

Personal information
- Full name: Oszkár Pál Gerde
- Born: 8 July 1883 Budapest, Austria-Hungary
- Died: 8 October 1944 (aged 61) Mauthausen-Gusen concentration camp, Nazi Germany (now Austria)
- Education: Fasori Gimnázium

Sport
- Sport: Fencing
- Event: Sabre
- Club: Magyar AC
- Coached by: Italo Santelli; László Borsody
Medal record
Representing Hungary
Olympic Games
Gold medal – first place	1908 London	Team sabre
Gold medal – first place	1912 Stockholm	Team sabre

Oszkár Pál Gerde (8 July 1883 – 8 October 1944) was a Hungarian sabre fencer who won team gold medals at the 1908 and 1912 Olympics. After finishing his active career he judged international fencing competitions and worked as a lawyer. Being a Jew, he was deported from Hungary in 1944, and killed in the same year at the Mauthausen-Gusen Concentration Camp in Austria. In 1989 he was inducted into the International Jewish Sports Hall of Fame.

== See also ==
- List of select Jewish fencers
- List of Jewish Olympic medalists
