= Italy at the 1912 Summer Olympics =

- IOC code: ITA

in Stockholm
- Competitors: 61 (all men)
- Flag bearer: Alberto Braglia
- Medals Ranked 11th: Gold 3 Silver 1 Bronze 2 Total 6

Summer Olympics appearances (overview)
- 1896; 1900; 1904; 1908; 1912; 1920; 1924; 1928; 1932; 1936; 1948; 1952; 1956; 1960; 1964; 1968; 1972; 1976; 1980; 1984; 1988; 1992; 1996; 2000; 2004; 2008; 2012; 2016; 2020; 2024

Other related appearances
- 1906 Intercalated Games

Italy competed at the 1912 Summer Olympics in Stockholm, Sweden.

== Medalists ==
Medal	Name	Sport	Event
Gold	Nedo Nadi	Fencing	Foil
Gold	Alberto Braglia	Gymnastics	All-around
Gold	Pietro Bianchi; Guido Boni; Alberto Braglia; Giuseppe Domenichelli; Carlo Fregosi; Alfredo Gollini; Francesco Loi; Luigi Maiocco; Giovanni Mangiante; Lorenzo Mangiante; Serafino Mazzarochi; Guido Romano; Paolo Salvi; Luciano Savorini; Adolfo Tunesi; Giorgio Zampori; Umberto Zanolini; Angelo Zorzi	Gymnastics	Team
Silver	Pietro Speciale	Fencing	Foil
Bronze	Fernando Altimani	Athletics	10 km walk
Bronze	Adolfo Tunesi	Gymnastics	All-around

== Aquatics ==
=== Diving ===
A single diver represented Italy. It was Italy's second appearance in diving, with Carlo Bonfanti being the nation's only diver both in 1912 and 1908. Bonfanti did not reach the final in either of his two events.

Rankings given are within the diver's heat.

Diver	Events	Heats		Final	
Diver	Events	Result	Rank	Result	Rank
Carlo Bonfanti	3 m board	46.81	4	Did not advance	
Carlo Bonfanti	Plain high dive	28.5	6	Did not advance	

=== Swimming ===
Two swimmers competed for Italy at the 1912 Games. It was the third time the nation appeared in swimming, and both swimmers had previously competed in 1908.

Neither Massa nor Baiardo was able to advance to an event final. Massa's second-place finish in his initial heat of the 100 metre freestyle was the only race in which either was not eliminated. Massa did not appear for his quarterfinal race, but was allowed to compete in the semifinals.

Ranks given for each swimmer are within the heat.

Men

Swimmer	Events	Heat		Quarterfinal		Semifinal		Final	
Swimmer	Events	Result	Rank	Result	Rank	Result	Rank	Result	Rank
Davide Baiardo	100 m freestyle	Unknown	4–6	Did not advance					
Davide Baiardo	400 m freestyle	N/A		Unknown	5	Did not advance			
Mario Massa	100 m freestyle	1:11.8	2 Q	–	– q	Did not finish		Did not advance	
Mario Massa	400 m freestyle	N/A		Did not finish		Did not advance			
Mario Massa	1500 m freestyle	N/A		Did not finish		Did not advance			

== Athletics ==
14 athletes represented Italy. It was the nation's third appearance in athletics. Fernando Altimani's bronze medal in the 10 kilometre racewalk was Italy's best result and only medal in the sport.

Ranks given are within that athlete's heat for running events.

Athlete	Events	Heat		Semifinal		Final	
Athlete	Events	Result	Rank	Result	Rank	Result	Rank
Fernando Altimani	10 km walk	N/A		48:54.2	4 Q	47:37.6	3rd place, bronze medalist(s)
Guido Calvi	800 m	?	4	Did not advance			
Guido Calvi	1500 m	N/A		Did not finish		Did not advance	
Nino Cazzaniga	Marathon	N/A				Did not start	
Orlando Cesaroni	Marathon	N/A				Did not start	
Daciano Colbacchini	110 m hurdles	16.1	2 Q	16.0	2	Did not advance	
Franco Giongo	100 m	?	2 Q	?	4	Did not advance	
Franco Giongo	200 m	?	2 Q	?	4	Did not advance	
Franco Giongo	200 m	?	3	Did not advance			
Manlio Legat	Long jump	N/A		5.50	29	Did not advance	
Manlio Legat	Pole vault	N/A		3.00	23	Did not advance	
Manlio Legat	Decathlon	N/A				1563.200	28
Aurelio Lenzi	Shot put	N/A		11.57	12	Did not advance	
Aurelio Lenzi	Discus throw	N/A		38.19	18	Did not advance	
Emilio Lunghi	400 m	50.5	2 Q	?	2	Did not advance	
Emilio Lunghi	800 m	?	2 Q	?	5	Did not advance	
Alfonso Orlando	5000 m	N/A		Did not finish		Did not advance	
Alfonso Orlando	10000 m	N/A		33:44.6	5 Q	33:31.2	5
Alfredo Pagani	110 m hurdles	?	3	Did not advance			
Alfredo Pagani	Long jump	N/A		5.95	27	Did not advance	
Alfredo Pagani	High jump	N/A		1.60	28	Did not advance	
Alfredo Pagani	Pentathlon	N/A				Elim-3 68	24
Alfredo Pagani	Decathlon	N/A				4425.550	18
Francesco Ruggero	Marathon	N/A				Did not finish	
Carlo Speroni	Marathon	N/A				Did not finish	
Angelo Tonini	Long jump	N/A		6.44	19	Did not advance	
Angelo Tonini	High jump	N/A		No mark	34	Did not advance	

== Fencing ==
Nine fencers represented Italy. It was the third appearance of the nation in fencing. Italy's foilists did well, taking the gold and silver medals as well as having a third finalist. The medals were Italy's first in individual amateur events. Nedo Nadi, the gold medalist in the foil, was also the only non-Hungarian to reach the final in the sabre, placing fifth.

Fencer	Event	Round 1		Quarterfinal		Semifinal		Final	
Fencer	Event	Record	Rank	Record	Rank	Record	Rank	Record	Rank
Edoardo Alaimo	Foil	0 losses	1 Q	0 losses	1 Q	1 loss	1 Q	4–3	5
Edoardo Alaimo	Sabre	4 wins	1 Q	Did not start		Did not advance			
Giovanni Benfratello	Sabre	3 wins	1 Q	3 losses	4	Did not advance			
Fernando Cavallini	Foil	1 loss	1 Q	1 loss	1 Q	Did not finish		Did not advance	
Nedo Nadi	Foil	0 losses	1 Q	1 loss	2 Q	0 losses	1 Q	7–0	1st place, gold medalist(s)
Nedo Nadi	Sabre	2 wins	2 Q	1 loss	1 Q	3 wins	2 Q	4–3	5
Francesco Pietrasanta	Foil	0 losses	1 Q	4 losses	5	Did not advance			
Francesco Pietrasanta	Sabre	3 wins	1 Q	1 loss	4	Did not advance			
Aristide Pontanani	Sabre	2 wins	2 Q	3 losses	4	Did not advance			
Pietro Speciale	Foil	2 losses	3 Q	0 losses	1 Q	0 losses	1 Q	5–2	2nd place, silver medalist(s)
Edoardo Alaimo; Gino Belloni; Giovanni Benfratello; Fernando Cavallini; Ugo Di Nola; Nedo Nadi	Sabre	N/A		1–0	1 Q	1–2	3	Did not advance	

== Football ==
Team Roster
- Edoardo Mariani
- Enrico Sardi
- Felice Berardo
- Franco Bontadini
- Enea Zuffi
- Pietro Leone
- Giuseppe Milano
- Carlo De Marchi
- Renzo De Vecchi
- Angelo Binaschi
- Piero Campelli
- Luigi Barbesino
- Modesto Valle
- Vittorio Morelli Di Popolo

Results

First round

1912-06-29

Italy	2 – 3 (a.e.t.)	Finland
Bontadini 10'; Sardi 25'		Öhman 2'; Soinio 40'; Wiberg 105'

Traneberg Stadium, Stockholm
Attendance: 600

Consolation quarterfinals

1912-07-01

Italy	1 – 0	Sweden
Bontadini 15'

Råsunda, Stockholm
Attendance: 2,500

Consolation semifinals

1912-07-03

Austria	5 – 1	Italy
Grundwald 40' 89'; Müller 30'; Hussak 49'; Studnicka 65'		Berardo 81'

Olympiastadion, Stockholm
Attendance: 3,500

Final rank
7th place

== Gymnastics ==
Eighteen gymnasts represented Italy. It was the third appearance of the nation in gymnastics. Italy entered six gymnasts in the individual competition, winning the gold and bronze medals and having all six gymnasts place in the top ten. Alberto Braglia, the defending Olympic champion, was the individual champion again. The Italian team also entered one of the three team competitions to win their second gymnastics gold of 1912.

=== Artistic ===
Gymnast	Events	Final	
Gymnast	Events	Result	Rank
Pietro Bianchi	All-around	127.75	6
Guido Boni	All-around	128.00	4
Alberto Braglia	All-around	135.00	1st place, gold medalist(s)
Guido Romano	All-around	126.25	9
Adolfo Tunesi	All-around	131.50	3rd place, bronze medalist(s)
Giorgio Zampori	All-around	128.00	4
Italy	Team	53.15	1st place, gold medalist(s)

== Wrestling ==
=== Greco-Roman ===
Italy was represented by six wrestlers in its second Olympic wrestling appearance. None of the six advanced past the fourth round, as the team compiled a combined record of 8-12.

Wrestler	Class	First round	Second round	Third round	Fourth round	Fifth round	Sixth round	Seventh round	Final			
Wrestler	Class	Opposition Result	Opposition Result	Opposition Result	Opposition Result	Opposition Result	Opposition Result	Opposition Result	Match A Opposition Result	Match B Opposition Result	Match C Opposition Result	Rank
Oreste Arpe	Light heavyweight	Kumpu (FIN); W	Lind (FIN); W	Rajala (FIN); L	Böhling (FIN); L	Did not advance		N/A	Did not advance			11
Zavirre Carcereri	Middleweight	Victal (POR); W	Andersson (SWE); L	Jokinen (FIN); L	Did not advance							20
Mariano Ciai	Featherweight	Leivonen (FIN); L	Lehmusvirta (FIN); L	Did not advance								26
Alessandro Covre	Lightweight	Pukkila (FIN); W	Kaplur (RUS); L	Väre (FIN); L	Did not advance							23
Renato Gardini	Light heavyweight	Trestler (AUT); W	Lind (FIN); W	Nilsson (SWE); L	Ahlgren (SWE); L	Did not advance		N/A	Did not advance			11
Andrea Gargano	Middleweight	Kokotowitsch (AUT); L	Antonopoulos (GRE); W	Steputat (GER); W	Fältström (SWE); L	Did not advance						11
