= Wrestling at the 1920 Summer Olympics – Men's Greco-Roman light heavyweight =

Wrestling at the Olympics

Men's light heavyweight Greco-Roman wrestling at the Games of the VII Olympiad
- Venue: Olympisch Stadion
- Dates: August 16–20
- Competitors: 18 from 11 nations

Medalists
| 1st place, gold medalist(s) | | Claes Johanson | Sweden |
| 2nd place, silver medalist(s) | | Edil Rosenqvist | Finland |
| 3rd place, bronze medalist(s) | | Johannes Eriksen | Denmark |

The men's Greco-Roman light heavyweight was a Greco-Roman wrestling event held as part of the Wrestling at the 1920 Summer Olympics programme. It was the third appearance of the event. Light heavyweight was the second heaviest category, including wrestlers weighing up to 82.5 kilograms.

A total of 18 wrestlers from 11 nations competed in the event, which was held from August 16 to August 20, 1920.

== Results ==
=== Gold medal round ===
Round of 32
Sven Ohlsson (SWE) | W
Jean Douvinet (FRA) | L
František Tázler (TCH) | W
Oscar Theisen (LUX) | L

Round of 16
Claes Johanson (SWE) | W
Edil Rosenqvist (FIN) | L
Johannes Eriksen (DEN) | W
Nathaniel Pendleton (USA) | L
Axel Tetens (DEN) | W
Herman Kruusenberg (EST) | L
Frank Maichle (USA) | W
Sven Ohlsson (SWE) | L
Jan Sint (NED) | W
Bruto Testoni (ITA) | L
Henri Snoeck (BEL) | W
František Kocián (TCH) | L
Émile Walhem (BEL) | W
Giovanni Cardinale (ITA) | L
Anders Rajala (FIN) | W
František Tázler (TCH) | L

Quarterfinals
Claes Johanson (SWE) | W
Johannes Eriksen (DEN) | L
Axel Tetens (DEN) | W
Frank Maichle (USA) | L
Jan Sint (NED) | W
Henri Snoeck (BEL) | L
Emile Wahlem (BEL) | W
Anders Rajala (FIN) | L

Semifinals
Claes Johanson (SWE) | W
Axel Tetens (DEN) | L
Jan Sint (NED) | W
Emile Wahlem (BEL) | L

Final
Claes Johanson (SWE) | W
Jan Sint (NED) | L

=== Silver medal round ===
| Semifinals | | Final |
| Johannes Eriksen (DEN) | W |
| Jan Sint (NED) | L | Johannes Eriksen (DEN) | L |
| Edil Rosenqvist (FIN) | W | Edil Rosenqvist (FIN) | W |
| Axel Tetens (DEN) | L |
