= Wrestling at the 1912 Summer Olympics – Men's Greco-Roman middleweight =

Men's middleweight Greco-Roman wrestling at the Games of the V Olympiad
- Venue: Stockholm Olympic Stadium
- Dates: July 6–15
- Competitors: 38 from 14 nations

Medalists
1st place, gold medalist(s)		Claes Johanson	Sweden
2nd place, silver medalist(s)		Martin Klein	Russian Empire
3rd place, bronze medalist(s)		Alfred Asikainen	Finland

The Greco-Roman middleweight competition at the 1912 Summer Olympics was part of the wrestling programme.

The event was held from July 6, 1912, to July 15, 1912. The official name was Middleweight A (maximum weight of 75 kilogram/165 lbs). A maximum of 12 wrestlers from the same nation were allowed to start. 38 wrestlers from 14 nations competed. The Swedish hosts had the strongest team with nine wrestlers.

The competition used a form of double-elimination tournament. Rather than using the brackets that are now standard for double-elimination contests (and which assure that each match is between two competitors with the same number of losses), each wrestler drew a number. The drawing and weighing was held on Sunday, July 6 from 2 p.m. to 3.30 p.m. at the Stadium. Each man would face off against the wrestler with the next number, provided he had not already faced that wrestler and that the wrestler was not from the same nation as him (unless this was necessary to avoid byes).

When only three wrestlers remain (the medalists), the double-elimination halts and a special final round is used to determine the order of the medals.

Middleweight was the third-heaviest category, including wrestlers weighing 67.5 to 75 kilograms (148.8 to 165.3 lb).

== Results ==
=== First round ===
38 wrestlers began the competition.

Losses	Winner	Loser	Losses
0	Edvin Fältström (SWE)	Anastasios Antonopoulos (GRE)	1
0	Peter Kokotowitsch (AUT)	Andrea Gargano (ITA)	1
0	Jānis Polis (RU1)	Stanley Bacon (GBR)	1
0	August Jokinen (FIN)	Alfred Gundersen (NOR)	1
0	Alfred Asikainen (FIN)	Edgar Bacon (GBR)	1
0	Fridolf Lundsten (FIN)	Viktor Melin (SWE)	1
0	Zavirre Carcereri (ITA)	Joaquim Vital (POR)	1
0	Mauritz Andersson (SWE)	Adrien Barrier (FRA)	1
0	Axel Frank (SWE)	Aleksandr Severov (RU1)	1
0	Emil Westerlund (FIN)	Theodor Dahlberg (SWE)	1
0	Claes Johanson (SWE)	Alois Totuschek (AUT)	1
0	Theodor Tirkkonen (FIN)	Noel Rhys (GBR)	1
0	Jan Sint (NED)	Sven Ohlsson (SWE)	1
0	Fritz Johansson (SWE)	Hvitfeldt Hansen (DEN)	1
0	Árpád Miskey (HUN)	Theodor Bergqvist (SWE)	1
0	Martin Klein (RU1)	Rezső Somogyi (HUN)	1
0	Adolf Kurz (GER)	Anders Andersen (DEN)	1
0	Joseph Merkle (GER)	Mikko Holm (FIN)	1
0	Karl Åberg (FIN)	Wilhelm Steputat (GER)	1

=== Second round ===
Alfred Gundersen and Wiktor Melin withdrew after their first round losses. 36 wrestlers started the second round, 19 with no losses and 17 with one.

11 were eliminated. 8 survived potential elimination (5 by eliminating another wrestler, 2 by giving previously undefeated wrestlers their first losses, and 1 via a bye). 6 received their first loss, while 13 remained undefeated (including one via bye).

Losses	Winner	Loser	Losses
1	Andrea Gargano (ITA)	Anastasios Antonopoulos (GRE)	2
0	Edvin Fältström (SWE)	Peter Kokotowitsch (AUT)	1
0	August Jokinen (FIN)	Jānis Polis (RU1)	1
0	Alfred Asikainen (FIN)	Stanley Bacon (GBR)	2
0	Fridolf Lundstein (FIN)	Edgar Bacon (GBR)	2
0	Mauritz Andersson (SWE)	Zavirre Carcereri (ITA)	1
1	Joaquim Victal (POR)	Adrien Barrier (FRA)	2
0	Axel Frank (SWE)	Emil Westerlund (FIN)	1
1	Aleksandr Siewierow (RU1)	Theodor Dahlberg (SWE)	2
0	Claes Johanson (SWE)	Teodor Tirkkonen (FIN)	1
1	Alois Totuschek (AUT)	Noel Rhys (GBR)	2
0	Jan Sint (NED)	Hvitfeldt Hansen (DEN)	2
0	Árpád Miskey (HUN)	Sven Ohlsson (SWE)	2
0	Frits Johansson (SWE)	Rezső Somogyi (HUN)	2
0	Martin Klein (RU1)	Theodor Bergqvist (SWE)	2
1	Mikko Holm (FIN)	Anders Andersen (DEN)	2
0	Karl Åberg (FIN)	Adolf Kurz (GER)	1
0	Joseph Merkle (GER)	Bye	—
1	Wilhelm Steputat (GER)	Bye	—

=== Third round ===
25 wrestlers started the third round, 13 with no losses and 12 with one.

6 were eliminated. 6 survived potential elimination (3 by eliminating another wrestler and 3 by giving previously undefeated wrestlers their first losses). 7 received their first loss, while 6 remained undefeated.

Losses	Winner	Loser	Losses
0	Joseph Merkle (GER)	Edvin Fältström (SWE)	1
1	Andrea Gargano (ITA)	Wilhelm Steputat (GER)	2
1	Peter Kokotowitsch (AUT)	Jānis Polis (RU1)	2
0	August Jokinen (FIN)	Zavirre Carcereri (ITA)	2
0	Alfred Asikainen (FIN)	Joaquim Victal (POR)	2
0	Fridolf Lundstein (FIN)	Mauritz Andersson (SWE)	1
1	Alois Totuschek (AUT)	Axel Frank (SWE)	1
0	Claes Johanson (SWE)	Aleksandr Siewierow (RU1)	2
1	Emil Westerlund (FIN)	Jan Sint (NED)	1
1	Teodor Tirkkonen (FIN)	Frits Johansson (SWE)	1
0	Martin Klein (RU1)	Árpád Miskey (HUN)	1
1	Mikko Holm (FIN)	Adolf Kurz (GER)	2
0	Karl Åberg (FIN)	Joseph Merkle (GER)	1

=== Fourth round ===
Axel Frank withdrew after his first loss, in the third round. 18 wrestlers started the fourth round, 6 with no losses and 12 with one.

Of the 9 matches, 8 resulted in an elimination. Only in the match between undefeated pair Johansson and Lundstein (in which no elimination was possible) did both wrestlers continue to the fifth round. In the four matches between an undefeated wrestler and one with one loss, the undefeated man won again, making Lundstein the only wrestler to lose undefeated status. The four remaining matches were all between two men with one loss apiece.

8 wrestlers were eliminated. 4 survived potential elimination. 1 received his first loss, while 5 remained undefeated.

Losses	Winner	Loser	Losses
1	Edvin Fältström (SWE)	Andrea Gargano (ITA)	2
0	August Jokinen (FIN)	Peter Kokotowitsch (AUT)	2
0	Alfred Asikainen (FIN)	Mauritz Andersson (SWE)	2
0	Claes Johanson (SWE)	Fridolf Lundstein (FIN)	1
1	Emil Westerlund (FIN)	Alois Totuschek (AUT)	2
1	Jan Sint (NED)	Teodor Tirkkonen (FIN)	2
1	Mikko Holm (FIN)	Frits Johansson (SWE)	2
0	Karl Åberg (FIN)	Árpád Miskey (HUN)	2
0	Martin Klein (RU1)	Joseph Merkle (GER)	2

=== Fifth round ===
10 wrestlers started the fifth round, 5 with no losses and 5 with one.

2 of the 5 matches resulted in double losses. Asikainen and Johanson both received their first loss in their match, while Klein took his first loss in the match that eliminated Westerlund.

In all, 4 wrestlers were eliminated. 1 survived potential elimination. 3 received their first losses, while 2 remained undefeated.

Losses	Winner	Loser	Losses
0	August Jokinen (FIN)	Edvin Fältström (SWE)	2
1*	Alfred Asikainen (FIN)	Claes Johanson (SWE)	1*
1	Jan Sint (NED)	Fridolf Lundstein (FIN)	2
1*	Martin Klein (RU1)	Emil Westerlund (FIN)	2*
0	Karl Åberg (FIN)	Mikko Holm (FIN)	2

=== Sixth round ===
6 wrestlers started the sixth round, 2 with no losses and 4 with one.

Only one man was eliminated in the sixth round. The other two matches were both potential eliminations (and thus, the sixth could have been the last non-final round), but the man with one loss came out on top of the undefeated wrestler in both of those. Thus, all 5 remaining men had one loss going into the seventh and last elimination round.

Losses	Winner	Loser	Losses
1	Claes Johanson (SWE)	August Jokinen (FIN)	1
1	Alfred Asikainen (FIN)	Jan Sint (NED)	2
1	Martin Klein (RU1)	Karl Åberg (FIN)	1

=== Seventh round ===
5 wrestlers started the seventh round, all with one loss.

Asikainen's bye in the round guaranteed him a medal. Klein defeated Jokinen to join him in the medals round, while Johansson defeated Åberg to make the third.

Losses	Winner	Loser	Losses
1	Martin Klein (RU1)	August Jokinen (FIN)	2
1	Claes Johanson (SWE)	Karl Åberg (FIN)	2
1	Alfred Asikainen (FIN)	Bye	—

=== Final round ===
With three wrestlers remaining, all of the previous results were ignored for the final round.

The bout between Klein and Asikainen turned out to be the last match, which lasted 11 hours and forty minutes, which is the world's longest wrestling match.

After Klein finally claimed victory, he was completely exhausted and was ruled unfit to compete in the final. Thus Johanson, whose only loss in the elimination rounds had been via a double loss to Asikainen, became the gold medalist.

Match		Winner	Loser	
A	To C	Martin Klein (RU1)	Alfred Asikainen (FIN)	To B
B	To C	Claes Johanson (SWE)	Alfred Asikainen (FIN)	Bronze
C	Gold	Claes Johanson (SWE)	Martin Klein (RU1)	Silver
