= Wrestling at the 1924 Summer Olympics – Men's Greco-Roman light heavyweight =

Wrestling at the Olympics

Men's light heavyweight Greco-Roman wrestling at the Games of the VIII Olympiad
- Venue: Vélodrome d'Hiver
- Dates: July 6–10, 1924
- Competitors: 22 from 15 nations

Medalists
1st place, gold medalist(s)		Carl Westergren	Sweden
2nd place, silver medalist(s)		Rudolf Svensson	Sweden
3rd place, bronze medalist(s)		Onni Pellinen	Finland

The men's Greco-Roman light heavyweight was a Greco-Roman wrestling event held as part of the wrestling events at the 1924 Summer Olympics from 6 to 10 July 2024. It was the fourth appearance of the event at the Olympics. Light heavyweight was the second-heaviest category, including wrestlers weighing 75 to 82.5 kilograms.

== Results ==
Source: Official results; Wudarski

The tournament was double-elimination.

=== First round ===
Losses	Winner	Loser	Losses
0	Ibrahim Moustafa (EGY)	Bruto Testonni (ITA)	1
0	Antonie Misset (NED)	Jean Baumert (FRA)	1
0	Johan Svensson (SWE)	Émile Walhelm (BEL)	1
0	Carl Westergren (SWE)	Seyfi Berksoy (TUR)	1
0	František Tázler (TCH)	Axel Tetens (DEN)	1
0	Arnolds Baumanis (LAT)	Franz Sax (AUT)	1
0	Svend Nielsen (DEN)	Jan Muijs (NED)	1
0	Béla Varga (HUN)	Dante Ceccatelli (ITA)	1
0	Emil Wecksten (FIN)	Rudolf Loo (EST)	1
0	István Dömény (HUN)	Paul Bonnefont (FRA)	1
0	Onni Pellinen (FIN)	Stevan Nađ (YUG)	1

=== Second round ===
Losses	Winner	Loser	Losses
0	Ibrahim Moustafa (EGY)	Jean Baumert (FRA)	2
0	Antonie Misset (NED)	Stevan Nađ (YUG)	2
0	Johan Svensson (SWE)	Seyfi Berksoy (TUR)	2
0	Carl Westergren (SWE)	František Tázler (TCH)	1
1	Axel Tetens (DEN)	Franz Sax (AUT)	2
0	Svend Nielsen (DEN)	Arnolds Baumanis (LAT)	1
0	Béla Varga (HUN)	Jan Muijs (NED)	2
0	Emil Wecksten (FIN)	Dante Ceccatelli (ITA)	2
1	Rudolf Loo (EST)	Pierre Bonnefont (FRA)	2
0	Onni Pellinen (FIN)	István Dömény (HUN)	1
–	Abandoned	Bruto Testonni (ITA)	–
–	Abandoned	Émile Walhelm (BEL)	–

=== Third round ===
Losses	Winner	Loser	Losses
0	Onni Pellinen (FIN)	Antonie Misset (NED)	1
0	Johan Svensson (SWE)	Svend Nielsen (DEN)	1
0	Carl Westergren (SWE)	Axel Tetens (DEN)	2
0	Emil Wecksten (FIN)	Béla Varga (HUN)	1
1	Rudolf Loo (EST)	István Dömény (HUN)	2
0	Ibrahim Moustafa (EGY)	Bye	–
–	Abandoned	František Tázler (TCH)	–
–	Abandoned	Arnolds Baumanis (LAT)	–

=== Fourth round ===
Losses	Winner	Loser	Losses
0	Ibrahim Moustafa (EGY)	Antonie Misset (NED)	2
0	Onni Pellinen (FIN)	Rudolf Loo (EST)	2
0	Johan Svensson (SWE)	Emil Wecksten (FIN)	1
0	Carl Westergren (SWE)	Béla Varga (HUN)	2
–	Abandoned	Svend Nielsen (DEN)	–

=== Fifth round ===
Losses	Winner	Loser	Losses
0	Johan Svensson (SWE)	Ibrahim Moustafa (EGY)	1
0	Carl Westergren (SWE)	Emil Wecksten (FIN)	2
0	Onni Pellinen (FIN)	Bye	–

=== Sixth round ===
After this round, the undefeated Svensson and Westergren and the one-loss Pellinen were left. Svensson and Westergren advanced to the seventh round to face each other for gold, while Pellinen received the bronze.

Losses	Winner	Loser	Losses
0	Johan Svensson (SWE)	Onni Pellinen (FIN)	1
0	Carl Westergren (SWE)	Ibrahim Moustafa (EGY)	2

=== Seventh round ===
Losses	Winner	Loser	Losses
0	Carl Westergren (SWE)	Johan Svensson (SWE)	1
