= Iceland at the 1912 Summer Olympics =

- IOC code: ISL
- NOC: Sports Association of Iceland

in Stockholm
- Competitors: 2 in 2 sports
- Medals: Gold 0 Silver 0 Bronze 0 Total 0

Summer Olympics appearances (overview)
- 1908; 1912; 1920–1932; 1936; 1948; 1952; 1956; 1960; 1964; 1968; 1972; 1976; 1980; 1984; 1988; 1992; 1996; 2000; 2004; 2008; 2012; 2016; 2020; 2024; 2028

Iceland competed in the Summer Olympic Games at the 1912 Summer Olympics in Stockholm, Sweden. Olympic historians treat Iceland's results separate from those of Denmark despite Iceland's lack of independence at the time.

== Athletics ==
A single athlete represented Iceland in athletics in the nation's debut at the sport and the Olympics. Halldórsson ran in the 100 metres, finishing fourth in his first round heat and not advancing to the semifinals.

Ranks given are within that athlete's heat for running events.

Athlete	Events	Heat		Semifinal		Final	
Athlete	Events	Result	Rank	Result	Rank	Result	Rank
Jón Halldórsson	100 m	12.4	4	did not advance			

== Wrestling ==
=== Greco-Roman ===
Iceland's Olympic debut also included a wrestler. Pétursson advanced to the fifth round of the light heavyweight competition on the strength of a 3–2 record (making Iceland one of a very few countries to have a winning record in wrestling). He did so despite facing four wrestlers from the dominant Finland team. Pétursson remains the only wrestler to represent Iceland at the Olympics.

Wrestler	Class	First round	Second round	Third round	Fourth round	Fifth round	Sixth round	Seventh round	Final			
Wrestler	Class	Opposition Result	Opposition Result	Opposition Result	Opposition Result	Opposition Result	Opposition Result	Opposition Result	Match A Opposition Result	Match B Opposition Result	Match C Opposition Result	Rank
Sigurjón Pétursson	Light heavyweight	Lind (FIN); W	Salila (FIN); W	Wiklund (FIN); L	Rajala (FIN); W	Varga (HUN); L	Did not advance	N/A	did not advance			6
