= Portugal at the 1912 Summer Olympics =

- IOC code: POR
- NOC: Olympic Committee of Portugal

in Stockholm
- Competitors: 6 in 3 sports
- Flag bearer: Francisco Lázaro
- Officials: 1
- Medals: Gold 0 Silver 0 Bronze 0 Total 0

Summer Olympics appearances (overview)
- 1912; 1920; 1924; 1928; 1932; 1936; 1948; 1952; 1956; 1960; 1964; 1968; 1972; 1976; 1980; 1984; 1988; 1992; 1996; 2000; 2004; 2008; 2012; 2016; 2020; 2024

Portugal's first participation in the Summer Olympic Games took place at the 1912 Summer Olympics in Stockholm, Sweden. The nation was represented by a delegation of six competitors, who took part in three sports but failed to win a medal. The Portuguese debut participation was marked by the death of flag bearer Francisco Lázaro, who succumbed to electrolytic imbalance after the marathon race.

== Athletics ==
4 athletes represented Portugal in the nation's Olympic debut. Lázaro collapsed during the marathon due to his use of wax to prevent sweating; he died the next morning.

Ranks given are within that athlete's heat for running events.

Athlete	Events	Heat		Semifinal		Final	
Athlete	Events	Result	Rank	Result	Rank	Result	Rank
Francisco Lázaro	Marathon	N/A				did not finish	
Armando Luzarte-Cortesão	400 m	?	3	did not advance			
Armando Luzarte-Cortesão	800 m	?	2 Q	?	6–9	did not advance	
António Stromp	100 m	?	3	did not advance			
António Stromp	200 m	?	3	did not advance			

== Fencing ==
A single fencer represented Portugal in that nation's Olympic debut. Fernando Correia was disqualified in the first round of the épée competition.

Fencer	Event	Round 1		Quarterfinal		Semifinal		Final	
Fencer	Event	Record	Rank	Record	Rank	Record	Rank	Record	Rank
Fernando Correia	Épée	Disqualified		did not advance					

== Wrestling ==
=== Greco-Roman ===
Portugal's Olympic debut included two wrestlers. Both wrestlers lost their first bout, won their second, and lost their third to be eliminated.

Wrestler	Class	First round	Second round	Third round	Fourth round	Fifth round	Sixth round	Seventh round	Final			
Wrestler	Class	Opposition Result	Opposition Result	Opposition Result	Opposition Result	Opposition Result	Opposition Result	Opposition Result	Match A Opposition Result	Match B Opposition Result	Match C Opposition Result	Rank
António Pereira	Featherweight	Haapanen (FIN); L	MacKenzie (GBR); W	Andersson (SWE); L	did not advance							19
Joaquim Victal	Middleweight	Carcereri (ITA); L	Barrier (FRA); W	Asikainen (FIN); L	did not advance							20

== Officials ==
- Fernando Correia (chief of mission)
