= 1914 Italian Athletics Championships =

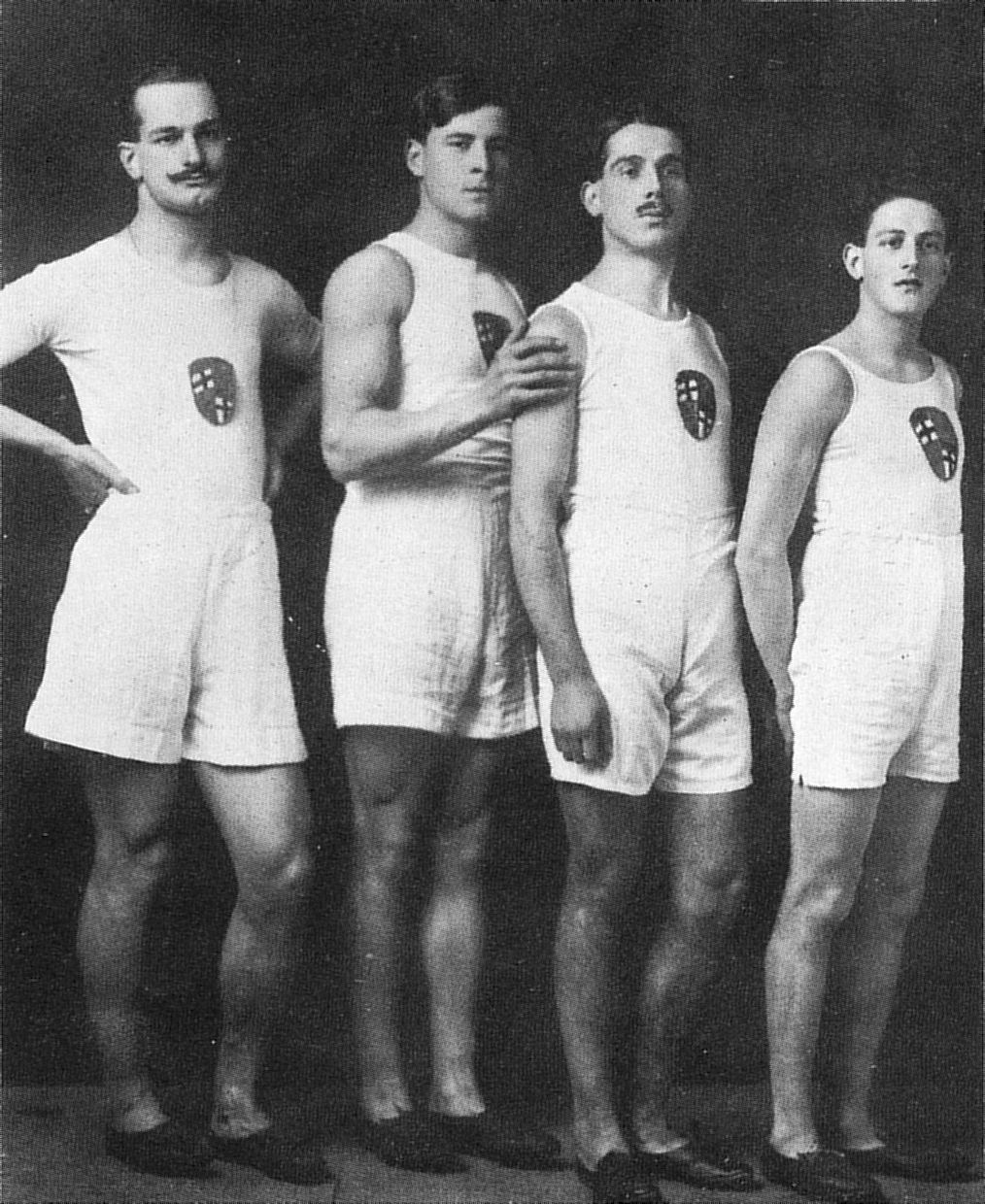
- Sport Club Italia (from left Franco Giongo, Gian Ercole Salvi, Vittorio Costa, Federico Colombo), champions in 4x400 m relay.
- Dates: 26–27 September
- Host city: Milan
- Level: Senior
- Events: 29

The 1914 Italian Athletics Championships were held in Milan. It was the ninth edition of the Italian Athletics Championships.

== Men ==
| Event | Winner | Performance |
|---|---|---|
| 100 metres | Franco Giongo | 11 2/5 |
| 200 metres | Franco Giongo | 23 2/5 |
| 400 metres | Franco Giongo | 51 3/5 |
| 800 metres | Emilio Lunghi | 2.02 3/5 |
| 1500 metres | Mario Candelori | 4.17 1/5 |
| 5000 metres | Primo Brega | 15.57.0 |
| 10000 metres | Carlo Speroni | 32.34 3/5 |
| Half marathon (track) | Carlo Speroni | 1:06.36.0 |
| Marathon | Umberto Blasi | 2:38.00 4/5 |
| 110 metres hurdles | Giovanni Villa | 16 2/5 |
| 400 metres hurdles | Giuseppe Bernardoni | 1.02.0 |
| 1200 metres steeplechase | Angelo Grosselli | 3.39 1/5 |
| Walk race 1500 metres | Francesco Altimani | 6.27 2/5 |
| Walk race 10000 metres | Giovanni Galli | 46.33 3/5 |
| Walk race 40 km | Donato Pavesi | 3:56.34.0 |
| Standing high jump | Carlo Butti | 1.347 m |
| Standing long jump | Oreste Zaccagna | 3.015 m |
| Standing triple jump | Oreste Zaccagna | 3.30 m |
| High jump | Carlo Andreoli | 1.715 m |
| Pole vault | Angelo Erba | 3.245 m |
| Long jump | Oreste Zaccagna | 6.37 m |
| Triple jump | Antonio Garimoldi | 13.03 m |
| Shot put | Giuseppe Tugnoli | 13.07 m |
| Stone throw | Giuseppe Tugnoli | 17.71 m |
| Discus throw | Giuseppe Tugnoli | 38.83 m |
| Free javelin throw | Luigi Nieddu | 50.25 m |
| Contested javelin throw | Gian Ercole Salvi | 47.41 m |
| 4x400 metres relay | Sport Club Italia; Franco Giongo, Gian Ercole Salvi, Vittorio Costa, Federico Colombo | 3:39.2 |
| Olympic relay | Sport Club Italia; Apollino Barelli, Giulio Casnati, Angelo Grosselli, Emilio Lunghi | 3:46.2 |
