= 1913 Italian Athletics Championships =

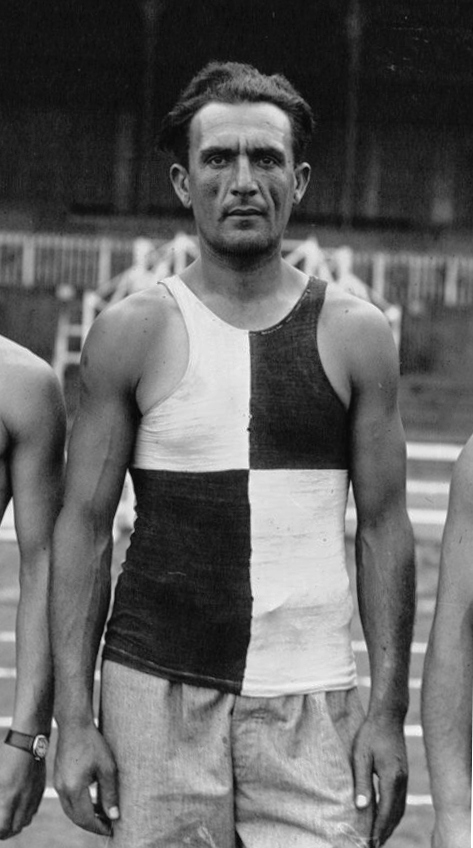
- Giuseppe Tugnoli that won two national titles in this first complete edition of the Italian Championships.
- Dates: 20–21 September
- Host city: Milan
- Level: Senior
- Events: 30

The 1913 Italian Athletics Championships were held in Milan. It was the eighth edition, but first complete, of the Italian Athletics Championships.

== Champions ==
Event	Athlete	Performance
100 m	Francesco Carturan	11.6
200 m	Giuseppe De Nicolai	24.0
400 m	Gian Ercole Salvi	51.2
800 m	Gian Ercole Salvi	2:06.2
1500 m	Emilio Lunghi	4:16.6
5000 m	Oreste Luppi	16:02.0
10,000 m	Carlo Martinenghi	34:05.6
Half marathon (20 km track)	Carlo Speroni	1:07:05.6
Marathon (40 km)	Angelo Malvicini	2:39.26.0
110 m hurdles	Giovanni Villa	16.4
400 m hurdles	Emilio Lunghi	62.4
1200 m steeplechase	Angelo Grosselli	3:36.6
1500 m walk	Fernando Altimani	6:31.6
10,000 m walk	Fernando Altimani	45:09.0
40 km walk	Giovanni Brunelli	3:42:32.8
High jump	Carlo Andreoli	1.675 m
Pole vault	Francesco Ventura	3.21 m
Long jump	Antonio Garimoldi	6.515 m
Triple jump	Antonio Garimoldi	13.895 m
Shot put	Giuseppe Tugnoli	12.95 m
Discus throw	Aurelio Lenzi	39.14 m
Javelin throw	Oreste Passuti	51.84 m
Standing high jump	Carlo Andreoli	1.325 m
Standing long jump	Mario Gnocchi	2.975 m
Standing triple jump	Mario Gnocchi	8.93 m
Stone throw	Giuseppe Tugnoli	16.50 m
Contested javelin throw	Ubaldo Bianchi	38.56 m
4×440 yards relay	Sport Pro Morivione Milano; Giuseppe Butti, Giuseppe Bernardoni, Dante Bertoni, Angelo Grosselli	3:41.8
Olympic relay	Sport Pro Morivione Milano; Dante Bertoni, Giuseppe Butti, Giorgio Croci, Angelo Grosselli	3:48.4
Cross country running (7.5 km)	Carlo Speroni	28:05
