= Wrestling at the 1912 Summer Olympics – Men's Greco-Roman light heavyweight =

Men's light heavyweight Greco-Roman wrestling at the Games of the V Olympiad
- Venue: Stockholm Olympic Stadium
- Dates: July 7–15
- Competitors: 29 from 12 nations

Medalists
2nd place, silver medalist(s)		Anders Ahlgren	Sweden
2nd place, silver medalist(s)		Ivar Böhling	Finland
3rd place, bronze medalist(s)		Béla Varga	Hungary

The Greco-Roman light heavyweight competition at the 1912 Summer Olympics was part of the wrestling programme.

The competition used a form of double-elimination tournament. Rather than using the brackets that are now standard for double-elimination contests (and which assure that each match is between two competitors with the same number of losses), each wrestler drew a number. Each man would face off against the wrestler with the next number, provided he had not already faced that wrestler and that the wrestler was not from the same nation as him (unless this was necessary to avoid byes).

When only three wrestlers remain (the medalists), the double-elimination halts and a special final round is used to determine the order of the medals.

The event was unusual in that no gold medal was awarded. The final match between Ahlgren and Böhling was declared a draw after more than 9 hours of wrestling. Since the rules of the contest were worded in such a way that the gold medalist had to have defeated his opponent, neither man could take the gold medal and both received silver.

Light heavyweight was the second-heaviest category, including wrestlers weighing 75 to 82.5 kilograms (165.3 to 181.9 lb).

== Results ==
=== First round ===
29 wrestlers began the competition.

Losses	Winner	Loser	Losses
0	Ivar Böhling (FIN)	Édouard Martin (FRA)	1
0	Anders Rajala (FIN)	Karl Groß (GER)	1
0	Peter Oehler (GER)	Otto Nagel (DEN)	1
0	Oreste Arpè (ITA)	Oskar Kumpu (FIN)	1
0	Sigurjón Pétursson (ISL)	Gustaf Lind (FIN)	1
0	Johan Salila (FIN)	Ragnar Fogelmark (SWE)	1
0	Oskar Wiklund (FIN)	Johannes Eriksen (DEN)	1
0	Béla Varga (HUN)	Karl Ekman (SWE)	1
0	Knut Lindberg (FIN)	Fritz Lange (GER)	1
0	Renato Gardini (ITA)	Johann Trestler (AUT)	1
0	Karl Lind (FIN)	Ansgar Løvold (NOR)	1
0	August Pikker (RUS)	Karl Barl (AUT)	1
0	Johan Andersson (SWE)	František Kopřiva (BOH)	1
0	Jens Christensen (DEN)	Ernst Nilsson (SWE)	1
0	Anders Ahlgren (SWE)	Bye	—

=== Second round ===
29 wrestlers started the second round, 15 with no losses and 14 with one. Ahlgren, who had had a bye in the first round, wrestled twice in the second.

10 wrestlers were eliminated, the most possible given that 5 of the 15 matches were between two undefeated wrestlers. 4 survived potential elimination by eliminating another wrestler. 5 received their first loss, while 10 remained undefeated.

Losses	Winner	Loser	Losses
0	Anders Ahlgren (SWE)	Edouard Martin (FRA)	2
0	Ivar Böhling (FIN)	Karl Gross (GER)	2
0	Anders Rajala (FIN)	Otto Nagel (DEN)	2
0	Peter Oehler (GER)	Oskar Kumpu (FIN)	2
0	Oreste Arpe (ITA)	Gustaf Lind (FIN)	2
0	Sigurjón Pétursson (ISL)	Johan Salila (FIN)	1
1	Johannes Eriksen (DEN)	Ragnar Fogelmark (SWE)	2
0	Oscar Wiklund (FIN)	Béla Varga (HUN)	1
0	Knut Lindberg (FIN)	Karl Ekman (SWE)	2
1	Fritz Lange (GER)	Johann Trestler (AUT)	2
0	Renato Gardini (ITA)	Karl Lind (FIN)	1
1	Karl Barl (AUT)	Ansgar Løvold (NOR)	2
0	Johan Andersson (SWE)	Augusts Pikker (RUS)	1
1	Ernst Nilsson (SWE)	František Kopřiva (BOH)	2
0	Anders Ahlgren (SWE)	Jens Christensen (DEN)	1

=== Third round ===
Augusts Pikker withdrew after his first loss, in the second round. 18 wrestlers started the third round, 10 with no losses and 8 with one.

3 wrestlers were eliminated. 5 survived potential elimination, 2 by eliminating another wrestler and 3 by defeating a previously undefeated man. 6 received their first loss, while 4 remained undefeated.

Losses	Winner	Loser	Losses
0	Ivar Böhling (FIN)	Peter Oehler (GER)	1
0	Anders Rajala (FIN)	Oreste Arpe (ITA)	1
1	Johannes Eriksen (DEN)	Johan Salila (FIN)	2
0	Oscar Wiklund (FIN)	Sigurjón Pétursson (ISL)	1
1	Béla Varga (HUN)	Knut Lindberg (FIN)	1
1	Fritz Lange (GER)	Johan Andersson (SWE)	1
1	Ernst Nilsson (SWE)	Renato Gardini (ITA)	1
0	Anders Ahlgren (SWE)	Karl Lind (FIN)	2
1	Jens Christensen (DEN)	Karl Barl (AUT)	2

=== Fourth round ===
15 wrestlers started the fourth round, 4 with no losses and 11 with one.

5 wrestlers were eliminated. 6 survived potential elimination, 3 by eliminating another wrestler and 2 by defeating a previously undefeated man (the 6th had a bye). 2 received their first loss, while Ahlgren and Böhling remained undefeated.

Losses	Winner	Loser	Losses
0	Ivar Böhling (FIN)	Oreste Arpe (ITA)	2
1	Sigurjón Pétursson (ISL)	Anders Rajala (FIN)	1
1	Johannes Eriksen (DEN)	Peter Oehler (GER)	2
1	Fritz Lange (GER)	Oscar Wiklund (FIN)	1
1	Béla Varga (HUN)	Johan Andersson (SWE)	2
1	Knut Lindberg (FIN)	Ernst Nilsson (SWE)	2
0	Anders Ahlgren (SWE)	Renato Gardini (ITA)	2
1	Jens Christensen (DEN)	Bye	—

=== Fifth round ===
Oscar Wiklund withdrew after his first loss, in the fourth round. 9 wrestlers started the fifth round, 2 with no losses and 7 with one.

4 wrestlers were eliminated in 4 matches. 3 survived potential elimination, 2 by eliminating another wrestler and 1 via a bye. Both of the undefeated wrestlers remained undefeated.

Losses	Winner	Loser	Losses
0	Ivar Böhling (FIN)	Jens Christensen (DEN)	2
1	Anders Rajala (FIN)	Johannes Eriksen (DEN)	2
1	Béla Varga (HUN)	Sigurjón Pétursson (ISL)	2
0	Anders Ahlgren (SWE)	Knut Lindberg (FIN)	2
1	Fritz Lange (GER)	Bye	—

=== Sixth round ===
5 wrestlers started the sixth round, 2 with no losses and 3 with one.

Böhling's win over Lange meant that the sixth round would the last elimination round, and that Böhling and Ahlgren (who had a bye in the round) would move on. The only other match in the round, between Varga and Rajala, determined the third finalist, with Varga handing Rajala his second loss to eliminate the Finn and move on to the finals round.

Losses	Winner	Loser	Losses
0	Ivar Böhling (FIN)	Fritz Lange (GER)	2
1	Béla Varga (HUN)	Anders Rajala (FIN)	2
0	Anders Ahlgren (SWE)	Bye	—

=== Final round ===
With three wrestlers remaining, all of the previous results were ignored for the final round.

Ahlgren and Böhling took turns defeating Varga, giving the Hungarian wrestler the bronze medal. The two remaining wrestlers had both moved through the elimination rounds undefeated, having not faced each other yet. The final match resulted in neither man able to defeat the other despite nine hours of trying. The match was eventually called a draw, and since neither man could claim victory both were awarded silver medals.

Match		Winner	Loser	
A	To C	Anders Ahlgren (SWE)	Béla Varga (HUN)	To B
B	To C	Ivar Böhling (FIN)	Béla Varga (HUN)	Bronze
C	Silver	Anders Ahlgren (SWE)	Ivar Böhling (FIN)	Silver
