= Giongo =

Giongo is an Italian surname. Notable people with the surname include:

- Franco Giongo (1891–1981), Italian athlete
- Maria Cristina Giongo (born 1951), Italian journalist and author

== See also ==
- Japanese sound symbolism
