= Johannes Eriksen =

Danish wrestler (1889–1963)

Personal information
- Born: 12 July 1889 Frederiksberg, Denmark
- Died: 25 June 1963 (aged 73) Frederiksberg, Denmark
Medal record
Men's Greco-Roman wrestling
Representing Denmark
Olympic Games
| Bronze medal – third place | 1920 Antwerp | Light heavyweight |

Johannes Thorvald Eriksen (12 June 1889 – 25 June 1963) was a Danish wrestler who competed in the 1908 Summer Olympics, in the 1912 Summer Olympics, and in the 1920 Summer Olympics. He was born and died in Frederiksberg.

In 1908, he was eliminated in the quarter-finals of the Greco-Roman middleweight competition.

Four years later, he was eliminated in the fifth round of the Greco-Roman light-heavyweight class after losing his fight to August Rajala.

At the 1920 Games, he won the bronze medal in the Greco-Roman light-heavyweight competition.
