= Martin Klein (wrestler) =

Estonian wrestler (1884–1947)

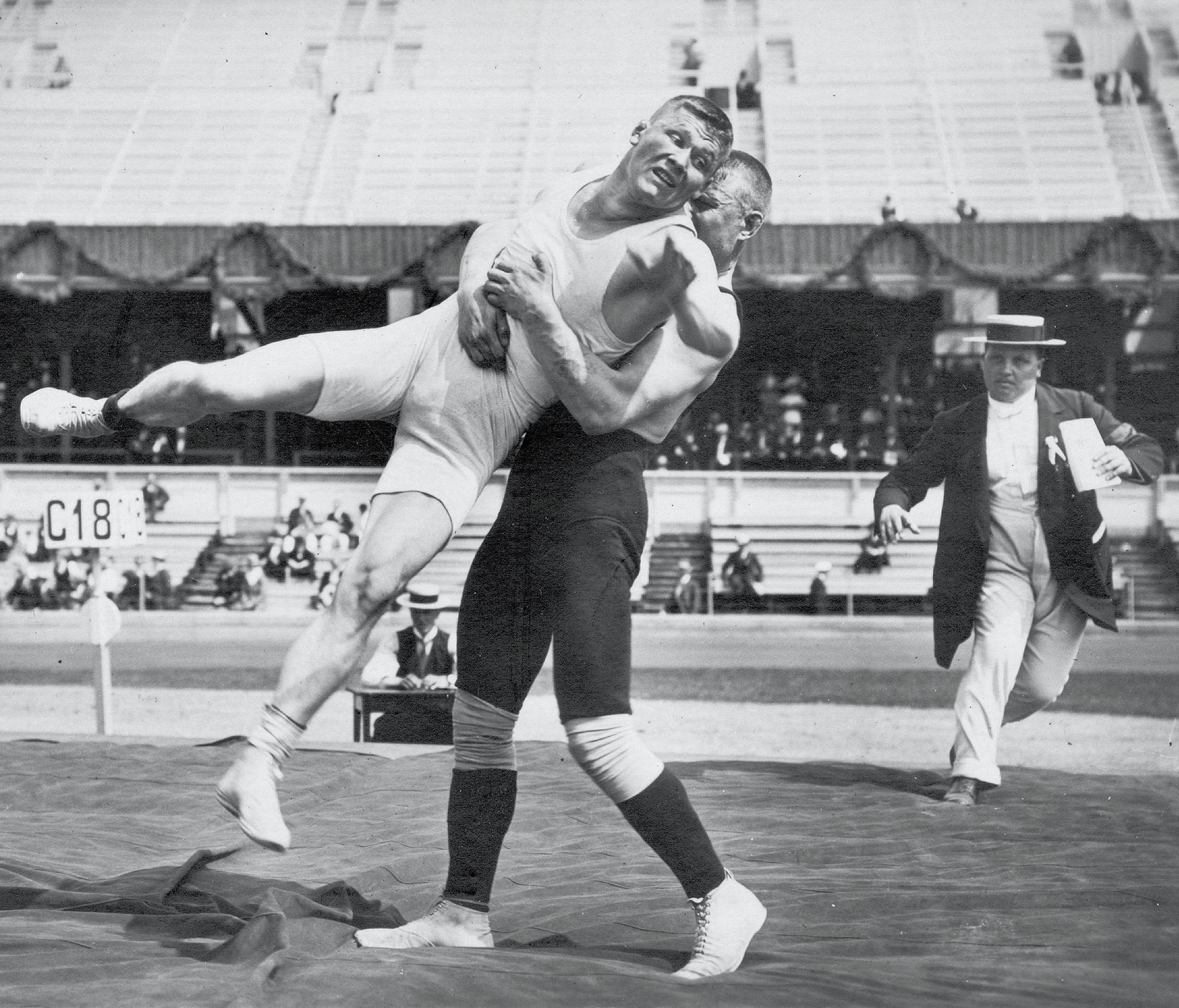
- Martin Klein (right) vs. Alfred Asikainen at the 1912 Olympics

Personal information
- Nationality: Estonian
- Born: 12 September 1884 Tarvastu, Kreis Fellin, Governorate of Livonia, Russian Empire
- Died: 11 February 1947 (aged 62) Tarvastu, then part of Estonian SSR, Soviet Union
- Height: 1.74 m (5 ft 9 in)
- Weight: 75–80 kg (165–176 lb)

Sport
- Sport: Greco-Roman wrestling
- Club: Sanitas, St. Petersburg
Medal record
Men's Greco-Roman wrestling
Representing Russian Empire
Olympic Games
Silver medal – second place	1912 Stockholm	Middleweight

Martin Klein (12 September 1884 – 11 February 1947) was an Estonian wrestler who competed for the Russian Empire at the 1912 Summer Olympics. He won the silver medal in the middleweight class, becoming the first Olympic medalist born in the territory of modern Estonia. In the semi-final against the reigning world champion Alfred Asikainen, (Note: Asikainen represented Finland, which was then part of the Russian Empire, but was competing as a separate team, under the Russian flag.) the two grappled for 11 hours and 40 minutes on a sunny day outdoors, until Klein managed to pin Asikainen. Klein was so exhausted from the bout – the longest wrestling match ever recorded – that he was unable to wrestle for the gold the next day, leaving Swedish wrestler Claes Johansson with the gold medal.

== Biography ==
Klein was born to a farmer and started training in wrestling only in his twenties. He left home aged 17 to work as a sailor, but after two years, together with his brother, signed up to a factory in Saint Petersburg, which was then the capital of the Russian Empire. Seeking additional income, he became a night-shift guardian in a wrestling club and, in this way, was introduced to the sport.

In 1910, Klein won his first title at the St. Petersburg Championships in the unlimited class. Besides the 1912 Olympics, he also competed at the 1913 World Championships but withdrew due to a hand injury. The same year, he won the Russian heavyweight title. During World War I, he served in the Russian army and later took part in the Estonian War of Independence. In 1919, he became a wrestling coach and prepared Estonian wrestlers for the 1920 Olympics. At those games, he was also offered a place as a competitor, but he refused in favor of his younger teammates. Klein continued coaching and competing in wrestling in Estonia until 1937. He died as a consequence of a hernia, which he developed when moving logs, and was buried in the Tarvastu cemetery. Since 1962, an international Martin Klein Memorial in Greco-Roman wrestling has been held in Viljandi, Estonia.

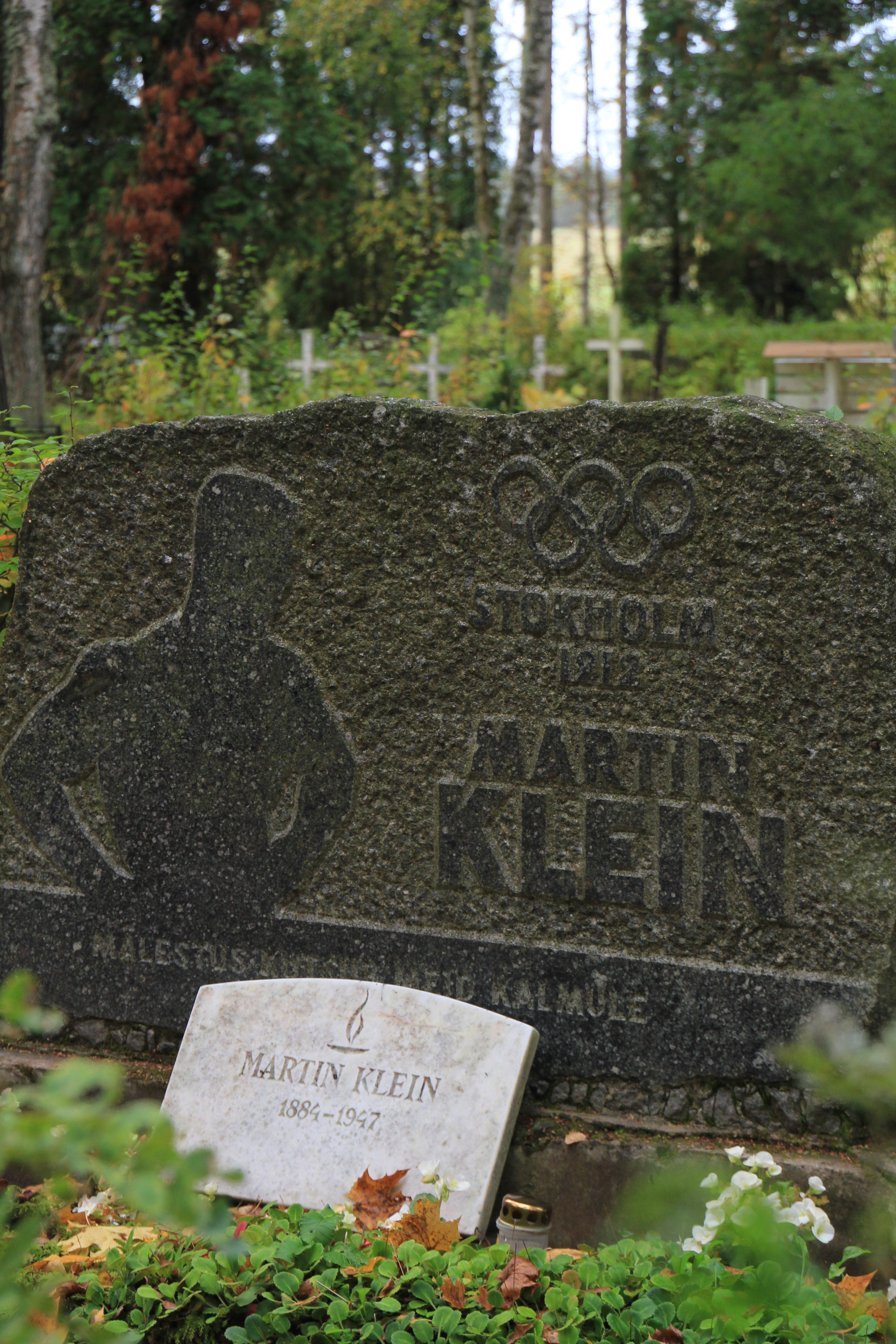
Martin Klein's headstone in Tarvastu cemetery.
