= Carl Ekman =

Carl Ekman may refer to:

- Carl Daniel Ekman (1845–1904), Swedish chemical engineer
- Carl Gustaf Ekman (1872–1945), Swedish prime minister

== See also ==
- Karl Ekman (1892–1945), Swedish wrestler
