= Jean Douvinet =

French wrestler

Jean Douvinet (7 June 1899 – 3 August 1987) was a French wrestler. He competed in the Greco-Roman light heavyweight at the 1920 Summer Olympics.
