= Viktor Melin =

Swedish wrestler

- Born: 18 April 1891; Kristianstad, Sweden
- Died: 24 September 1973 (aged 82); Stockholm, Sweden

Viktor Melin (18 April 1891 – 24 September 1973) was a Swedish wrestler. He competed in the middleweight event at the 1912 Summer Olympics.

Melin represented Djurgårdens IF and Brandkårens IK. He won the 1915 Swedish championship in Greco-Roman middleweight for Brandkårens IK.
