= Onni Pellinen =

Finnish wrestler (1899–1950)

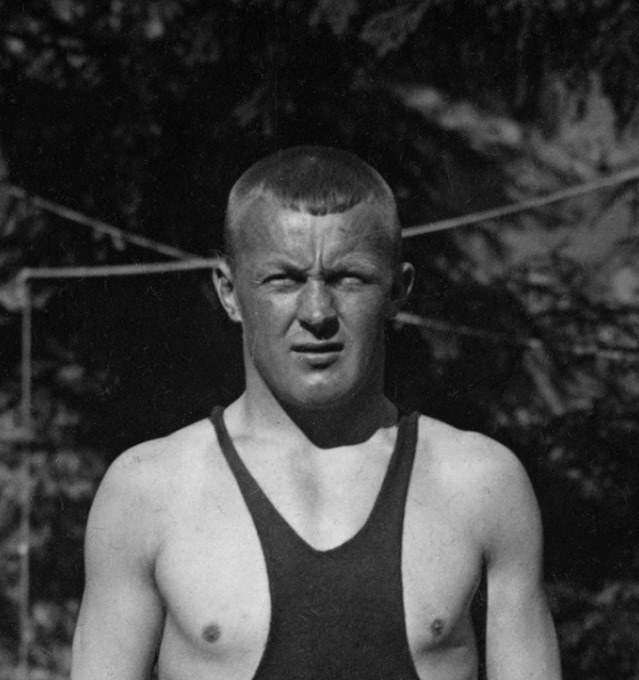
- Born: 14 February 1899; Hankasalmi, Grand Duchy of Finland, Russian Empire
- Died: 30 October 1950 (aged 51); Istanbul, Turkey

Onni Pellinen
Medal record

Men's Greco-Roman wrestling

Representing Finland

Olympic Games
Silver medal – second place	1932 Los Angeles	Light heavyweight
Bronze medal – third place	1924 Paris	Light heavyweight
Bronze medal – third place	1928 Amsterdam	Light heavyweight

Onni Pellinen (14 February 1899 – 30 October 1950) was a Finnish wrestler and Olympic medalist in Greco-Roman wrestling.

== Olympics ==
Pellinen competed at the 1924 Summer Olympics in Paris where he won a bronze medal in Greco-Roman wrestling, in the light heavyweight class .

He won another bronze medal at the 1928 Summer Olympics in Amsterdam.

At the 1932 Summer Olympics in Los Angeles he won a silver medal.
