= Gian Ercole Salvi =

Italian athlete

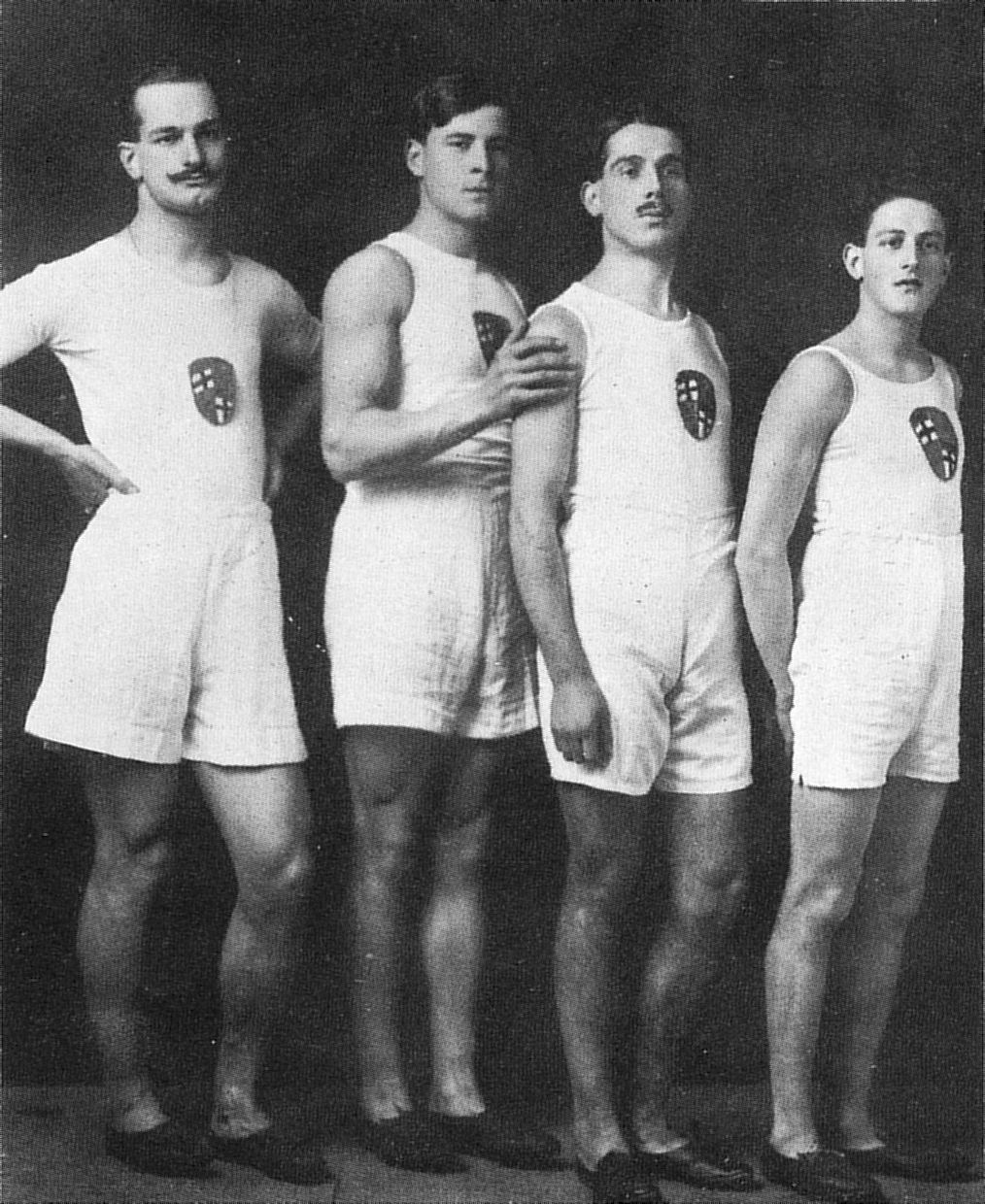
- Salvi (second from left) in a 1914 picture.

Personal information
- Nationality: Italian
- Born: 1892 Bologna, Italy
- Died: unknown

Sport
- Country: Italy
- Sport: Athletics
- Events: Sprining; Middle-distance running Javelin throw
- Club: Sport Club Italia

Achievements and titles
- Personal best: 400 metres: 51.1 (1913)

Gian Ercole Salvi (1892 - 1972) was an Italian athlete and then a manager of the Virtus Pallacanestro Bologna.

== Personal best ==
- 400 metres: 51.2 (Milan, 20 September 1913)

== National titles ==
He won five national championships at individual senior level.

- Italian Athletics Championships
  - 200 metres: 1919
  - 400 metres: 1913, 1919
  - 800 metres: 1913
  - Contested javelin throw: 1914
