= Ansgar Løvold =

Norwegian sport wrestler (1888–1961)

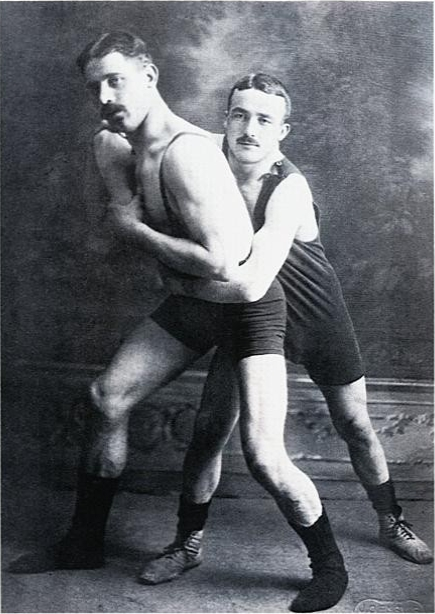
- Løvold on the left, 1910s
- Born: 19 November 1888; Kristiansund, Norway
- Died: 12 November 1961 (aged 72); Kristiansund, Norway
- Occupation: Butcher
- Known for: Olympic wrestler and philanthropist

Ansgar Løvold (19 November 1888 – 12 November 1961) was a Norwegian wrestler, butcher and philanthropist from Kristiansund. He is most known for participating at the 1912 Summer Olympics and for launching the idea for the Kristiansund and Frei Fixed Link.

Løvold started wrestling while in Oslo as a wandering journeyman. He joined IF Ørnulf and became Norwegian Champion in Greco-Roman wrestling in 1912. This qualified him to the 1912 Olympics in Stockholm, but Løvold lost both his matches in the light heavyweight event. He moved back to Kristiansund in 1913, where he founded a wrestling club and started as an instructor. He also founded wrestling clubs in Molde and Trondheim. As a butcher, he ran several butcher shops in town. From 1951, Løvold dedicated his time to working towards a fixed link for Kristiansund.

== Early life and professional career ==
Løvold was born on 19 November 1888 in Kristiansund, Norway, as son of Missionary Ole Løvold (1846–1919). Løvold started as a butcher apprentice with his brother B. O. Løvold, before setting out on his Wanderjahre, where he worked at Bye in Bergen and Axel Jensen in Oslo. He received his trade certificate in 1910. He moved back to Kristiansund in 1913, where he lived for the rest of his life. He married Bergljot, who died in 1958.

Løvold established a butcher shop in Storgaten in 1914, which he ran until it was taken over by the municipality in 1917. He then operated various retailing businesses until joining Nordmøre Slakteri. There he was chief of operations until the slaughtering company closed in 1932. He then established Ansgar Kjøtt og Pølseforretning, which at first was located at Nordmør Landbruksforretning butafter two years moved to Massestretet. His store was destroyed in the bombings of the Norwegian campaign during World War II, although rebuilt after the war. After he retired, the store was taken over by his sons.

== Sports career ==
It was during his time in Oslo as a wandering journeyman that Løvold joined organized wrestling. Wrestling was first introduced in Kristiansund by Løvold, who wrestled at circuses and town fairs. On 8 January 1911 he held a major show against circus artist Erik Blixt, for which Løvold was promised 100 Norwegian krone (NOK) if he won. Although successful, he did not accept the prize money, as it would have made him a professional. He started competing for Fagforeningernes TIF and later IF Ørnulf in Oslo. He represented the latter when he won the 1912 Norwegian championships, thus qualifying him for the 1912 Summer Olympics in Stockholm. There he participated in the Greco-Roman light heavyweight, but was sent home after losing both his introductory rounds, against Finland's Karl Lind and Austria's Karl Barl.

After moving home to Kristiansund in 1913, Løvold was instrumental in establishing a wrestling club. The sport became popular and within a few years all the major sports clubs were offering wrestling. Especially the labor movement's clubs took up the sport, and Kristiansund was quickly known as a wrestling town. Løvold coached several clubs, including IL Nordlandet and Ynglingen. In 1913 he succeeded at getting sponsorships of NOK 300 from various companies throughout town to purchase mats, which was instrumental in making the sport more popular in town. He later became known as a benefactor and sponsor of local wrestling. Kristiansund's first major national tournament was held in 1915 and the first Norwegian Championships in Kristiansund were held in 1922. Løvold also traveled to the neighboring town of Molde to establish a wrestling club there, although wrestling never became as popular in Molde as in Kristiansund. He also established Trondheim's first wrestling club. From 1939, when the labourers' wrestling clubs in Kristiansund merged to form the club Kristiansund AK, Løvold represented this club.

== Philanthropy ==
Løvold was an active member of Foreningen Kristiansunderen, an organization which worked for the betterment of the town. After seeing The Little Mermaid in Copenhagen, Løvold started working to build a mermaid statue fountain in Kristiansund. The mermaid statue was never built, although he eventually secured sufficient funding to build a fountain. Løvold traveled to the United States in 1951 to visit his siblings Oscar and Lise in Minnesota, which he had not seen in 42 years. He also visited New York City, where he drove through the Holland Tunnel. On his way home he came in contact with Prime Minister Oscar Torp.

Back in Kristiansund, Løvold started working with the idea of building a subsea road tunnel from Kristiansund to the mainland. He discussed the issue in Foreningen Kristiansunderen where it received support. Løvold was an important enthusiast for the fixed link project, which would materialize as the Kristiansund and Frei Fixed Link in 1992. The local press dubbed him the fixed link general. In 1955 he organized an inspection of Freifjorden; using echo sounding it was possible to survey the depth of the fjord. Afterwards he took contact with County Governor Olav Oksvik and the two started working towards implementing the plans.

Along with Engineer Gunnar Tonning, Løvold traveled several times to Oslo to meet with national politicians and authorities. In addition to Torp, he consulted the engineering company Aas-Jakobsen, the NATO office and Kolbjørn Varmann, Minister of Transport and Communications. In 1958 a joint municipal and county committee was established to follow up the plans, where Løvold was appointed chairman. Its main function was the ordering seismic surveys of Freifjorden, which gave positive results. Major Worm Eide advised caution and stated that there was no funding available. Subsequently, a committee led by Ole Mollan was appointed, which criticized the original committee for not prioritizing more critical transport investments.

During the entire planning and construction of the Tromsø Bridge, Løvold subscribed to both the Tromsø newspapers, Nordlys and Bladet Tromsø, to follow the development. Erling Kjeldsen, who was the main initiator of the Tromsø Bridge, was an inspiration for Løvold. Following in the steps of Tromsø, Løvold established Tunnellforeningen ("The Tunnel Association"). Its prime goal was to circulate a petition, which received 6,000 signatures—two-thirds of the electorate. The organization also featured paroles in the 1961 Constitution Day parade. During the summer, Løvold painted a large, white "tunnel entrance" on a cliff at Spellmannshaugen as a public relations gimmick. The point he painted was the exact location the Freifjord Tunnel would have its opening. Another organization, Fastlandsforeningen ("The Mainland Association") was established by Løvold on 27 September 1961. That year another public committee was established, again chaired by Løvold. Løvold died on 12 November 1961 in Kristiansund, aged 72.
