= Francesco Ruggero =

Italian athlete

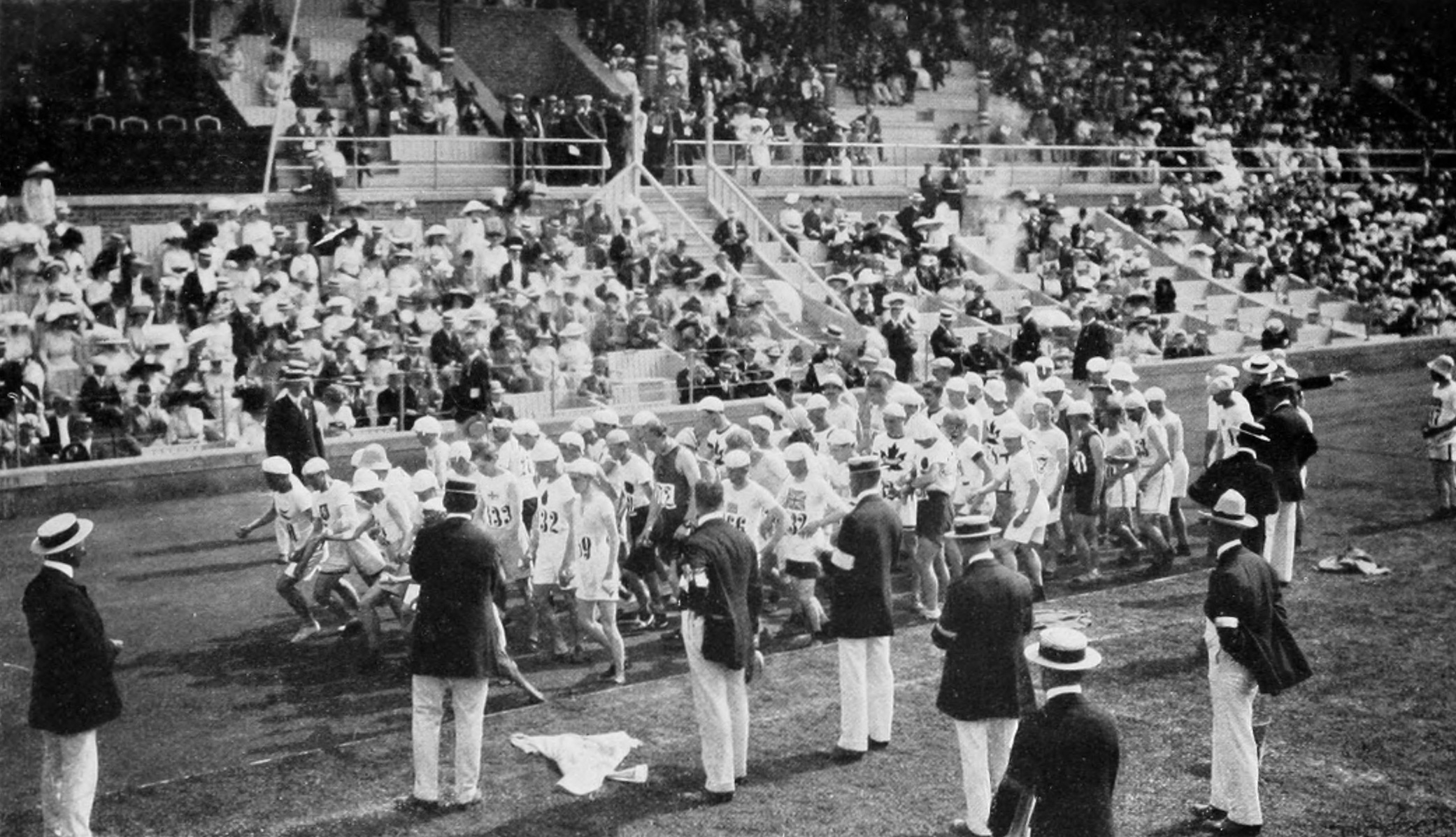
- Francesco Ruggero, one of the 68 competitors at the start of 1912 Olympic marathon in Stockholm

Personal information
- Nationality: Italian
- Born: 22 November 1891 Campobasso, Italy

Sport
- Country: Italy
- Sport: Athletics
- Event(s): Long-distance running Marathon

Francesco Ruggero (22 November 1891 – 9 June 1966) was an Italian long-distance runner.

== Biography ==
He competed in the marathon at the 1912 Summer Olympics. Francesco Ruggero lined up at the start of the marathon of the 1912 Summer Olympics on behalf of the Italian colony living in New York City, who paid all the expenses, and then left for Stockholm from the United States.

== Achievements ==
Year	Competition	Venue	Position	Event	Performance	Note
1912	Olympic Games	(Sweden) Stockholm	DNF	Marathon	NT	

== See also ==
- Italy at the 1912 Summer Olympics
