= Fritz Johansson =

Swedish wrestler (1893–1971)

- Born: 27 May 1893; Arlöv, Sweden
- Died: 19 September 1971 (aged 78); Malmö, Sweden

Fritz Rudolf Johansson (27 May 1893 – 19 September 1971) was a Swedish wrestler. He competed in the middleweight event at the 1912 Summer Olympics.
