= István Dömény =

Hungarian wrestler (1899–1966)

- Born: 3 August 1899
- Died: 6 December 1966 (aged 67)

István Dömény (3 August 1899 – 6 December 1966) was a Hungarian wrestler. He competed in the Greco-Roman light heavyweight event at the 1924 Summer Olympics. He was a two-time national team champion, winning in 1925 and 1926.
