= Seyfi Berksoy =

Turkish wrestler

Personal information
- Born: 1903
- Died: 12 November 1974 (aged 70–71)

Seyfi Berksoy (1903 – 12 November 1974) was a Turkish wrestler. He competed in the Greco-Roman light heavyweight event at the 1924 Summer Olympics.
