= Dante Ceccatelli =

Italian wrestler

- Born: 14 July 1895; Prato, Italy
- Died: 13 March 1936

Dante Ceccatelli (14 July 1895 – 13 March 1936) was an Italian wrestler. He competed in the Greco-Roman light heavyweight event at the 1924 Summer Olympics.
