= Alfred Gundersen =

Norwegian wrestler

- Born: 11 May 1892; Oslo, Norway
- Died: 8 January 1958 (aged 65); Oslo, Norway

Alfred Gundersen (11 May 1892 – 8 January 1958) was a Norwegian wrestler. He represented the club IF Ørnulf and competed in the middleweight event at the 1912 Summer Olympics.
