= Theodor Bergqvist =

Swedish wrestler

- Born: 13 May 1885; Gothenburg, Sweden
- Died: 13 January 1969 (aged 83); Gothenburg, Sweden

Axel Theodor Bergqvist (13 May 1885 – 13 January 1969) was a Swedish wrestler. He competed in the middleweight event at the 1912 Summer Olympics.
