= Emil Wecksten =

Finnish wrestler

- Born: 28 August 1895; Kirkkonummi, Finland
- Died: 20 December 1985 (aged 90); Kotka, Finland

Emil Wecksten (28 August 1895 – 20 December 1985) was a Finnish wrestler. He competed in the Greco-Roman light heavyweight event at the 1924 Summer Olympics.
