= Aleksandr Severov =

Russian wrestler

- Born: 24 February 1889; St. Petersburg, Russian Empire
- Died: 1961 (aged 71–72)

Aleksandr Severov (24 February 1889 – 1961) was a Russian wrestler. He competed in the middleweight event at the 1912 Summer Olympics.
