= František Kocián =

Czech wrestler

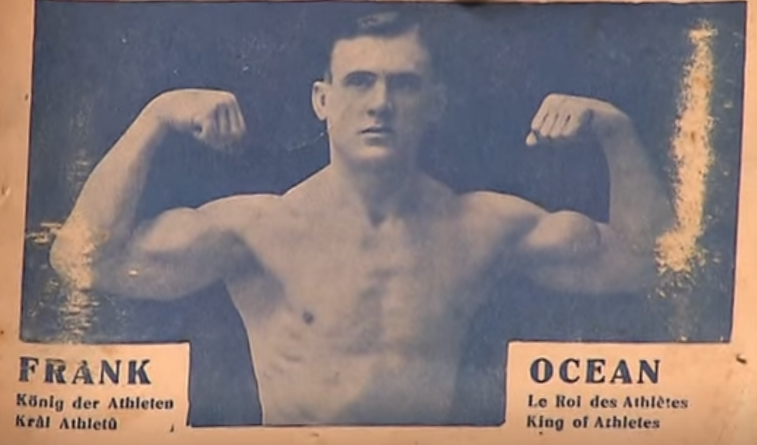

Personal information
- Born: 20 November 1894 Nýřany

Sport
- Sport: Wrestling

František Kocián (born 20 November 1894, date of death unknown) was a Czech wrestler. He competed in the Greco-Roman light heavyweight event at the 1920 Summer Olympics.
