= Ingvar Ericsson (runner) =

Swedish middle-distance runner (1927–2020)

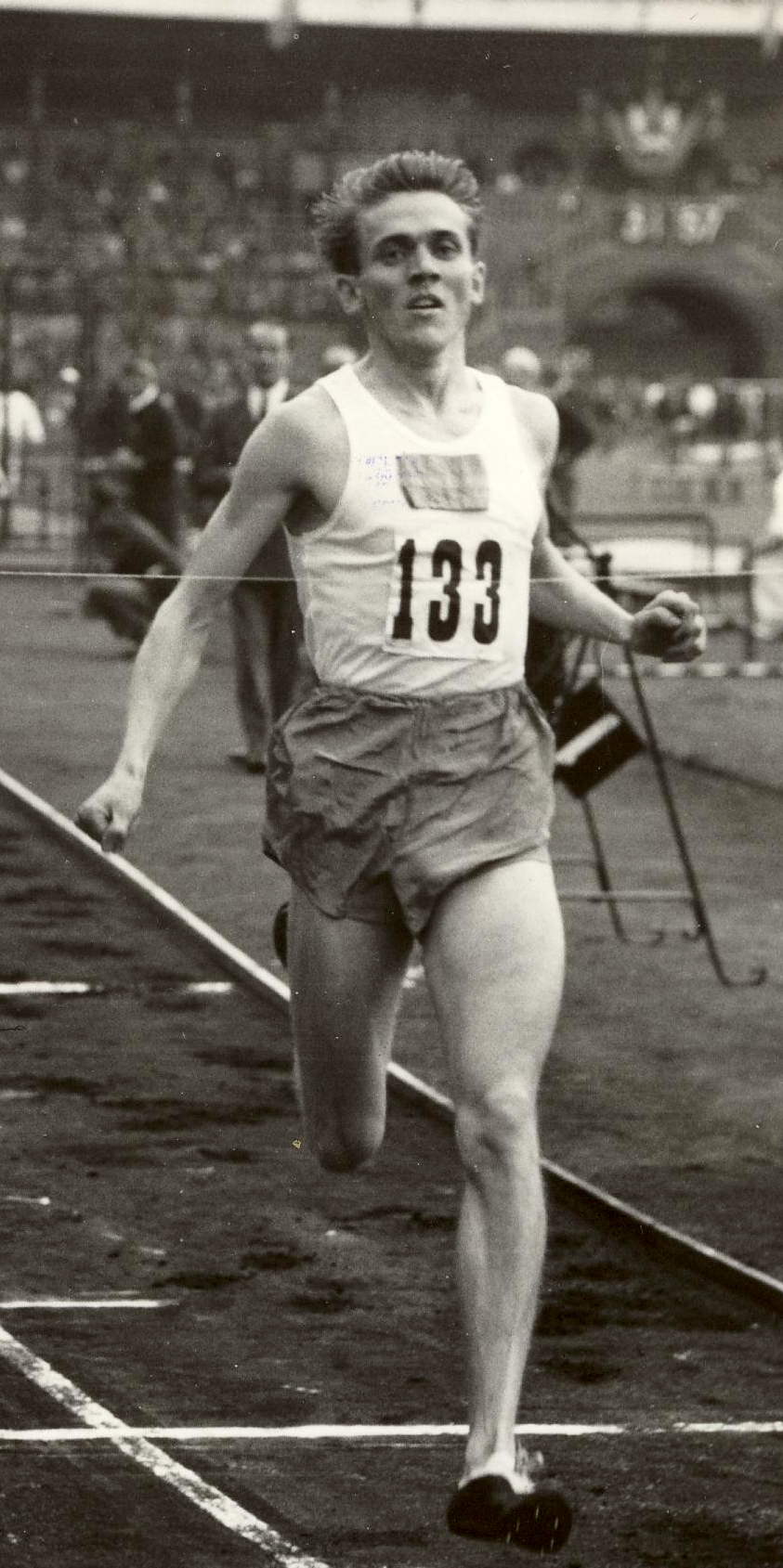
- Ingvar Ericsson in 1954

Personal information
- Born: Ingvar Axel Harald Ericsson; 31 August 1927 Rinna, Boxholm, Sweden
- Died: 14 May 2020 (aged 92)
- Height: 1.78 m (5 ft 10 in)
- Weight: 62 kg (137 lb)

Sport
- Sport: Athletics
- Event(s): 1500 m, steeplechase
- Club: Brandkårens IK

Achievements and titles
- Personal best(s): 1500 m – 3:41.2 (1956); 3000mS – 9:12.2 (1951)

Ingvar Axel Harald Ericsson (31 August 1927 – 14 May 2020) was a Swedish middle-distance runner who specialized in the 1500 m event.

He competed at the 1952 and 1956 Summer Olympics and finished eighth in 1952. At the European championships he was seventh in 1950 and fourth in 1954. Ericsson won the national 1500 m title in 1952, 1954 and 1955 and set a new national record in 1956. He was a firefighter by profession and represented Brandkårens IK.
