= Theodor Dahlberg =

Swedish wrestler

- Born: 1 May 1884; Kungsbacka, Sweden
- Died: 13 February 1963 (aged 78); Gothenburg, Sweden

Alfred Theodor Dahlberg (1 May 1884 – 13 February 1963) was a Swedish wrestler. He competed in the middleweight event at the 1912 Summer Olympics.
