= Henri Snoeck =

Belgian wrestler

Henri Snoeck was a Belgian wrestler. He competed in the Greco-Roman light heavyweight and the freestyle light heavyweight events at the 1920 Summer Olympics.
