= Oscar Theisen =

Luxembourgish wrestler (1897–??)

- Born: 1897

Oscar Theisen (born 1897, date of death unknown) was a Luxembourgish wrestler. He competed in the Greco-Roman light heavyweight event at the 1920 Summer Olympics.
