= Alois Totuschek =

Austrian wrestler

- Born: 2 February 1885; Nové Město na Moravě, Austria-Hungary

Alois Totuschek (born 2 February 1885, date of death unknown) was an Austrian wrestler. He competed in the middleweight event at the 1912 Summer Olympics.
