= Frank Maichle =

American wrestler

- Born: April 20, 1896; Cohocton, New York, U.S.
- Died: August 10, 1983 (aged 87); Kenilworth, Illinois, U.S.

Frank Martin Maichle (April 20, 1896 – August 10, 1983) was an American wrestler. He competed in the Greco-Roman light heavyweight event at the 1920 Summer Olympics.
