= Ragnar Fogelmark =

Swedish wrestler

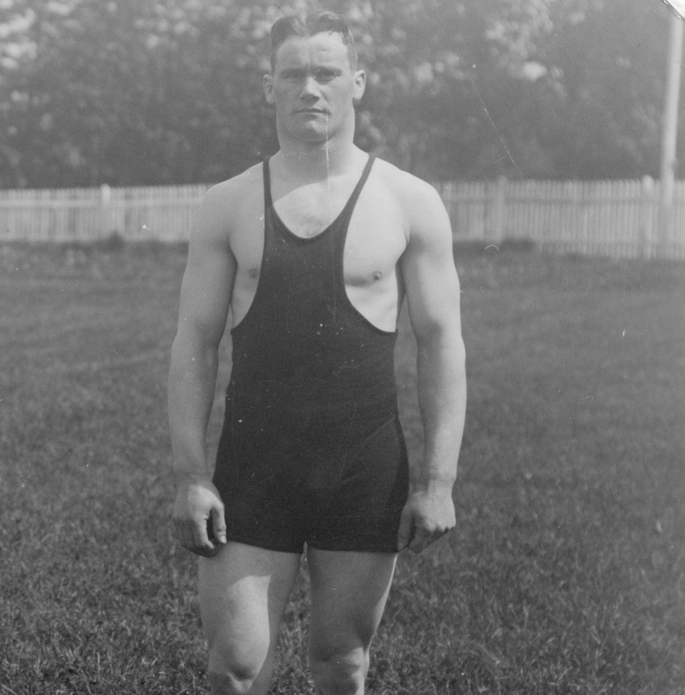
- Full name: Karl Algot Ragnar Fogelmark
- Born: 15 March 1888; Visby, Sweden
- Died: 20 September 1914 (aged 26); Karlstad, Sweden

Karl Algot Ragnar Fogelmark (15 March 1888 – 20 September 1914) was a Swedish wrestler. He competed in the light heavyweight event at the 1912 Summer Olympics. Fogelmark committed suicide in 1914.

Fogelmark represented Djurgårdens IF.
