= August Pikker =

Estonian wrestler (1889–1976)

- Born: 4 February 1889; Vorbuse, Kreis Dorpat, Governorate of Livonia, Russian Empire
- Died: 10 March 1976 (aged 87); San Francisco, California, United States

August Aleksander Pikker (4 February 1889 – 10 March 1976) was an Estonian wrestler. He competed for the Russian Empire in the light heavyweight event at the 1912 Summer Olympics. He was married to Amanda Elfriede Pikker (1907–1993).
