= Battista Cardinale =

Italian wrestler

- Born: 10 June 1895; Genoa, Italy
- Died: 20 August 1978 (aged 83); Genoa, Italy

Battista Cardinale (10 June 1895 – 20 August 1978) was an Italian wrestler. He competed in the Greco-Roman light heavyweight event at the 1920 Summer Olympics.
