= Carlo Butti =

Italian decathlete (1891–1971)

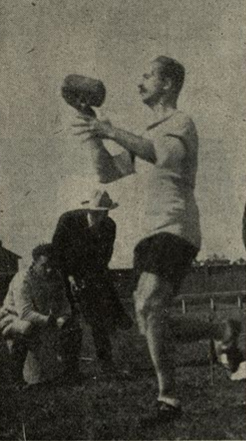
- Carlo Butti

Personal information
- Nationality: Italian
- Born: 1 September 1891; Milan
- Died: 14 April 1971 (aged 79); Milan

Sport
- Country: Italy
- Sport: Athletics
- Event: Decathlon

Carlo Butti (1 September 1891 – 14 March 1971) was an Italian decathlete who competed at the 1920 Summer Olympics,

== Biography ==
He specialized in throws, but versatile to the point of participating in the Olympic Games in Antwerp 1920 in the decathlon. He has been nine times Italian champion in four different disciplines of athletics.

From 1929 to 1930, he was secretary of the Italian Athletics Federation (FIDAL) with the president Augusto Turati, a role that he continued to hold for a few months also in 1931, with the president Luigi Ridolfi.

== National titles ==
- Italian Athletics Championships
  - Standing high jump: 1914 (1)
  - Stone throw: 1921, 1922 (2)
  - Vibrated ball: 1919, 1920, 1921, 1922 (4)
  - Team vibrated ball: 1920, 1921 (2)

== See also ==
- Men's high jump Italian record progression
