= Antonie Misset =

Dutch wrestler

- Born: 14 January 1901; The Hague, Netherlands
- Died: 1 November 1974 (aged 73); The Hague, Netherlands

Antonie Misset (14 January 1901 – 1 November 1974) was a Dutch wrestler. He competed in the Greco-Roman light heavyweight event at the 1924 Summer Olympics.
