= Theodor Tirkkonen =

Finnish wrestler

- Born: 6 February 1883; Helsinki, Finland
- Died: 24 April 1951 (aged 68); Helsinki, Finland

Theodor Alexander Tirkkonen (6 February 1883 – 24 April 1951) was a Finnish wrestler. He competed in the middleweight event at the 1912 Summer Olympics.
