= Árpád Miskey =

Hungarian wrestler (1886–1962)

- Born: 11 September 1886; Budapest, Austria-Hungary
- Died: 15 October 1962 (aged 76)

Árpád Miskey (11 September 1886 – 15 October 1962) was a Hungarian wrestler.

== Olympics career ==
He competed in the middleweight event at the 1912 Summer Olympics.
