= Paul Bonnefont =

French wrestler (1902–1966)

- Born: 14 October 1902; L'Espiougue, Esplas-de-Sérou, France
- Died: 2 August 1966 (aged 63); Toulouse, France

Paul Bonnefont (14 October 1902 – 2 August 1966) was a French wrestler. He competed in the Greco-Roman light heavyweight event at the 1924 Summer Olympics.
