= Rezső Somogyi =

Hungarian wrestler

- Born: 27 July 1887; Mosdós, Hungary
- Died: 28 November 1975 (aged 88); Budapest, Hungary

Rezső Somogyi (27 July 1887 – 28 November 1975) was a Hungarian wrestler. He competed in the middleweight event at the 1912 Summer Olympics.
