= Arnolds Baumanis =

Latvian wrestler

- Weight: Light heavyweight 67–75 kg (148–165 lb)
- Born: 3 May 1901
- Olympic team: 1924

Arnolds Baumanis (born 3 May 1901, date of death unknown) was a Latvian wrestler. He competed in the Greco-Roman light heavyweight event at the 1924 Summer Olympics.
