= Franz Sax =

Austrian wrestler

- Born: 1895

Franz Sax (born 1895, date of death unknown) was an Austrian wrestler. He competed in the Greco-Roman light heavyweight event at the 1924 Summer Olympics.
