= Fridolf Lundsten =

Finnish wrestler

- Born: 26 July 1884; Pohja, Finland, Russian Empire
- Died: 5 January 1947 (aged 62); Helsinki, Finland

Fridolf Vilhelm Lundsten (26 July 1884 – 5 January 1947) was a Finnish wrestler. He competed at the 1912 Summer Olympics and the 1924 Summer Olympics.
