= Adrien Barrier =

French wrestler

- Born: 7 March 1891; Madriat, France
- Died: 29 July 1915 (aged 24); Hohrod, France

Adrien Antonin Barrier (7 March 1891 – 29 July 1915) was a French wrestler. He competed in the middleweight event at the 1912 Summer Olympics. He was killed in action during World War I.
