= Emil Westerlund =

Finnish wrestler (1887–1964)

- Born: 6 February 1887; Uusimaa, Finland
- Died: 18 February 1964 (aged 77); Helsinki, Finland

Emil Aleksander Westerlund (6 February 1887 – 18 February 1964) was a Finnish wrestler. He was born in Uusimaa, and was the brother of Edvard Westerlund and Kalle Westerlund. He competed at the 1912 and 1920 Summer Olympics. In 1920 he shared the fifth place in the light-heavyweight class, Freestyle wrestling.
