= Oskari Kumpu =

Finnish wrestler (1889–1935)

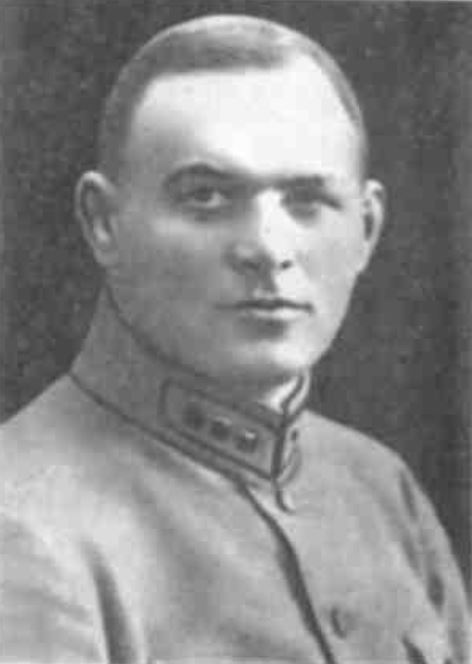
- Oskari Kumpu in the early 1920s
- Born: 29 January 1889; Askola, Finland
- Died: 25 June 1935 (aged 46); Olonets, Soviet Union

Oskari Viljami Kumpu (29 January 1889 – 25 June 1935) was a Finnish wrestler and a military officer. He competed in the light heavyweight event at the 1912 Summer Olympics. In the 1918 Finnish Civil War, Kumpu fought for the Red Guards. After the war, he fled to Soviet Russia and joined the Red Army.

== Biography ==
Oskar Kumpu competed for the sports club Helsinki Jyry, winning the Greco-Roman light heavyweight Finnish Championship in 1917. In the 1912 Summer Olympics, Kumpu lost his first round match against the Italian Oreste Arpè. As the Finnish Civil War broke out in January 1918, Kumpu joined the Helsinki Red Guard elite unit which was composed of Jyry athletes.

After the Red defeat, Kumpu fled to Soviet Russia, where he finished a course in the Petrograd Red Officer School. In the Russian Civil War, Kumpu fought against the Finnish Whites in East Karelia. In January 1922, he took part in the famous Battle of Kimasozero where the Red Army battalion, led by the legendary Finnish officer Toivo Antikainen, beat the Whites and pushed them back to Finland.

Later in the 1920s, Kumpu continued his wrestling career under the instruction of the Russian champion Ivan Poddubny, but without great success. He then rejoined the Red Army and was placed at the Military Commissariat of the Olonetsky District in 1933. Kumpu was drowned while swimming in the Olonka River in June 1935.
