= Brandkårens IK =

Sports club in Stockholm, Sweden

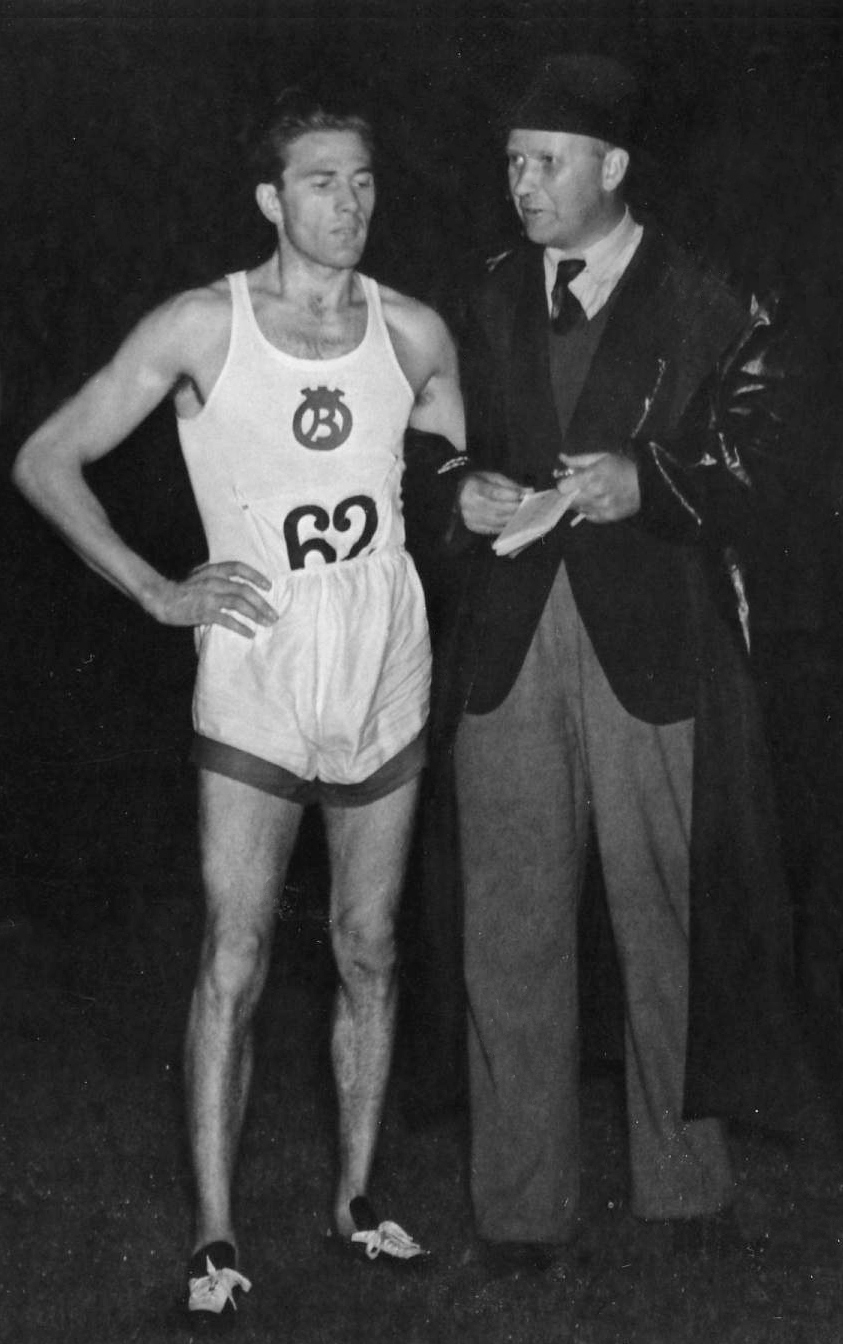
Runner Henry Jonsson (left), in the colours of Brandkårens IK, together with Gösta Holmér

Brandkårens Idrottsklubb (lit. 'The fire brigade's sports club'), commonly known as Brandkårens IK, is a sports club in Stockholm, Sweden, founded in 1912, and mainly active in the sport of athletics and wrestling and as works sports club for firefighters within Korpen Svenska Motionsidrottsförbundet.

== History ==
Brandkårens Idrottsklubb was founded 31 October 1912, shortly after the 1912 Summer Olympics in Stockholm, for Stockholm firefighters, with Carl Gyllenhammar as its first chair. Gyllenhammar was the chair until 1921.

Brandkårens IK was one of Stockholm's more prominent wrestling, athletics and tug of war clubs in the first half of the 20th century. The firefighter profession was fitting the amateurism ideal of the time with several Stockholm athletes in the profession representing the club, and runner Gunder Hägg working as firefighter in Gävle and representing Gefle IF.

Until 1938, Brandkårens IK had won 24 Swedish championship titles in wrestling and were awarded best club in both Greco-Roman and freestyle events in 1934. The club was represented by wrestlers such as Viktor Melin, Rudolf Svensson, Nils Åkerlindh, Hilding Hansson, Herbert Olofsson och Frans Westergren.

In athletics, Oskar Malmbrant won the 1932 national title in hammer throw. The relay team won the 1938 national title in 4 × 1500 metres relay, setting a new Swedish record of 16:11.2.

The club runners broke the world record on the men's 4 × mile relay and men's 4 × 1500 metres relay in August 1941. During a 1941 Swedish championship event in Gothenburg, the Brandkårens IK 4 × 1500 metres relay team consisting of Åke Jansson, Hugo Karlén, (Note: Svenska Dagbladet mentions Harald Karlén, however World Athletics lists Hugo Karlén.) Henry Jonsson, and Bror Hellström fought the Gefle IF team to beat the World record previously held by Finland. In the race, both Brandkåren and Gefle were under the previous mark with Brandkåren winning on 15:42.0, 7.8 seconds ahead of Gefle and 12 seconds below the Finland mark. The same quartet then ran 4 × mile relay two weeks later and beat the World record previously held by Indiana University, setting a new mark of 17:02.8. Jansson, Jonsson and Hellström also won several individual national titles on 1,500, 5,000 and 10,000 metres between 1938 and 1942. Ingvar Ericsson represented the club and won the 1952, 1954, and 1955 national championships on 1,500 metres.

Brandkårens IK was one of the organisers of the 1999 World Police and Fire Games together with Stockholmspolisens IF and Stockholm Municipality. In corporate sports, Brandkårens IK was awarded Årets korplag (Corporation team of the year) in 2023.

== Emblem and colours ==
The athletics colours of Brandkårens is white with red details and the letter B in red.
