= Sigurjón Pétursson =

Icelandic wrestler (1888–1955)

- Born: 9 March 1888; Reykjavík, Iceland
- Died: 3 May 1955 (aged 67); Reykjavík, Iceland

Sigurjón Pétursson (9 March 1888 – 3 May 1955) was an Icelandic wrestler. He competed in the light heavyweight event at the 1912 Summer Olympics.

Sigurjón later became an industrialist: by 1946, he was the owner of a textile factory at Álafoss just outside Reykjavik. He also took a keen interest in Icelandic culture and psychic research.

Sigurjón believed he experienced telepathic communication with, amongst other dead Icelanders, the nineteenth-century Icelandic poet Jónas Hallgrímsson. He concluded that the remains of Jónas should be brought from Denmark, where he died, to his birthplace in Iceland. This debate over this scheme is known in Icelandic as the beinamálið ('bones question').
