= Alfred Asikainen =

Finnish wrestler (1888–1942)

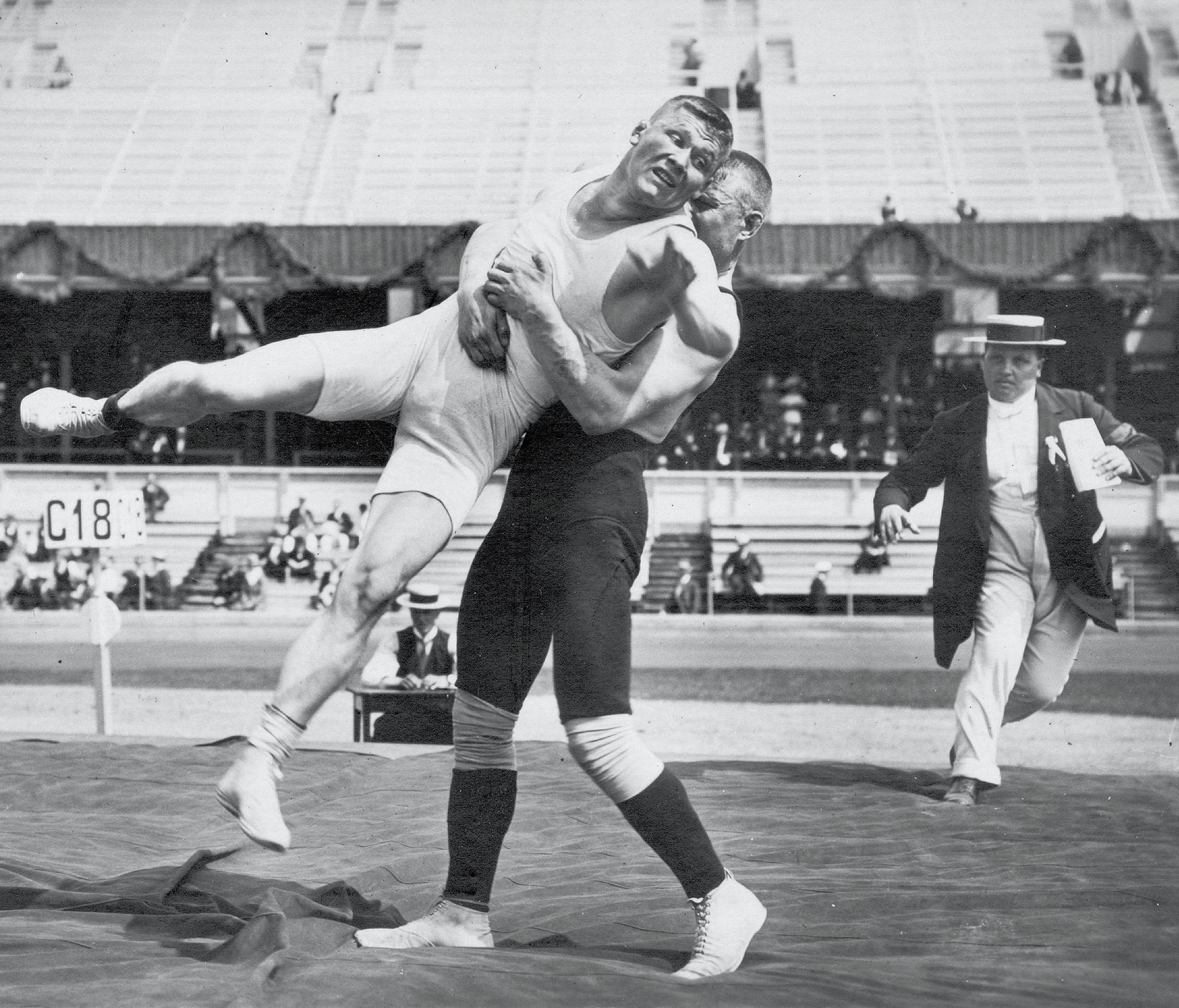
- Asikainen (right, in black) and Klein wrestling at the 1912 Olympics

Personal information
- Born: 2 November 1888 Viipuri, Grand Duchy of Finland, Russian Empire
- Died: 7 January 1942 (aged 53) Mäntsälä, Uusimaa, Finland
- Weight: Middleweight (67.5–75kg)
Medal record
Men's Greco-Roman wrestling
Representing Finland
Olympic Games
Bronze medal – third place	1912 Stockholm	Middleweight
World Championships
Gold medal – first place	1911 Helsinki	Middleweight

Alfred Johan "Alpo" Asikainen (2 November 1888 – 7 January 1942) was a Finnish wrestler who competed in the 1912 Summer Olympics, winning the bronze medal.

== Sporting career ==
Asikainen won the Greco-Roman middleweight event at the 1911 World Wrestling Championships in Helsinki. It was the only time he finished on the podium at a World Wrestling Championship.

At the 1912 Olympics, Asikainen won against his first four opponents, including the eventual winner Claes Johanson. In the semifinal, he wrestled Estonian Martin Klein, who was forced to represent Russia, for eleven hours and forty minutes (time limits were introduced to wrestling in 1924) on a blisteringly sunny day outdoors in the Stockholm Olympic Stadium. After one hour, a short rest was granted, and then every thirty minutes.

Asikainen lost by pin, and Klein withdrew from the final due to exhaustion, resulting in Johanson winning the gold medal by default. Asikainen was awarded the bronze medal. The bout between Asikainen and Klein remains the longest wrestling match in history.
