= Sven Ohlsson (wrestler) =

Swedish wrestler

- Born: 25 February 1886; Värnamo, Sweden
- Died: 27 April 1961 (aged 75); Stockholm, Sweden

Sven Johan August Ohlsson (25 February 1886 – 27 April 1961) was a Swedish wrestler. He competed at the 1912 Summer Olympics and the 1920 Summer Olympics.

Sven Ohlsson represented Djurgårdens IF and Brandkårens IK.
