= Peter Kokotowitsch =

Austrian wrestler

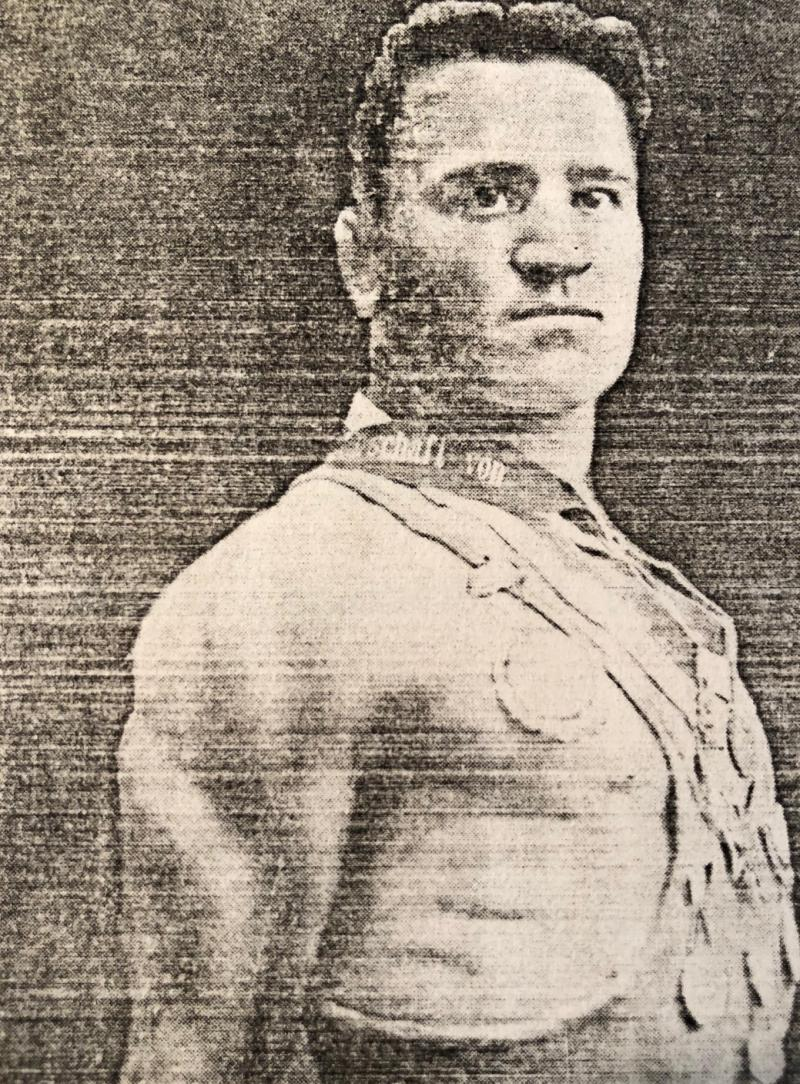
- Born: Petar Kokotović; 8 October 1890; Plaški, Kingdom of Croatia-Slavonia, Austria-Hungary
- Died: 12 July 1968 (aged 77); Chicago, Illinois, U.S.
- Other name: Peter Kovick
- Citizenship: Austria-Hungary; United States
- Occupations: Amateur wrestler; businessman
- Known for: Competing at the 1912 Summer Olympics

Peter Kokotowitsch (Serbo-Croatian: Petar Kokotović / Петар Кокотовић; 8 October 1890 – 12 July 1968) was a Croatian Serb wrestler. He competed for Austria in the middleweight event at the 1912 Summer Olympics. Afterwards, he emigrated to the United States, where he adopted US citizenship and changed his name to Peter Kovick on 27 March 1929.

He spent his business career in the U.S. with the Continental Can Company, and became a division manager before retiring in 1954. He later worked as a consultant to the Campbell's. Kovick also became active with Serbian-American organizations and helped displaced refugees who came to the United States after World War II.
