= Maria Cristina Giongo =

Italian journalist and author

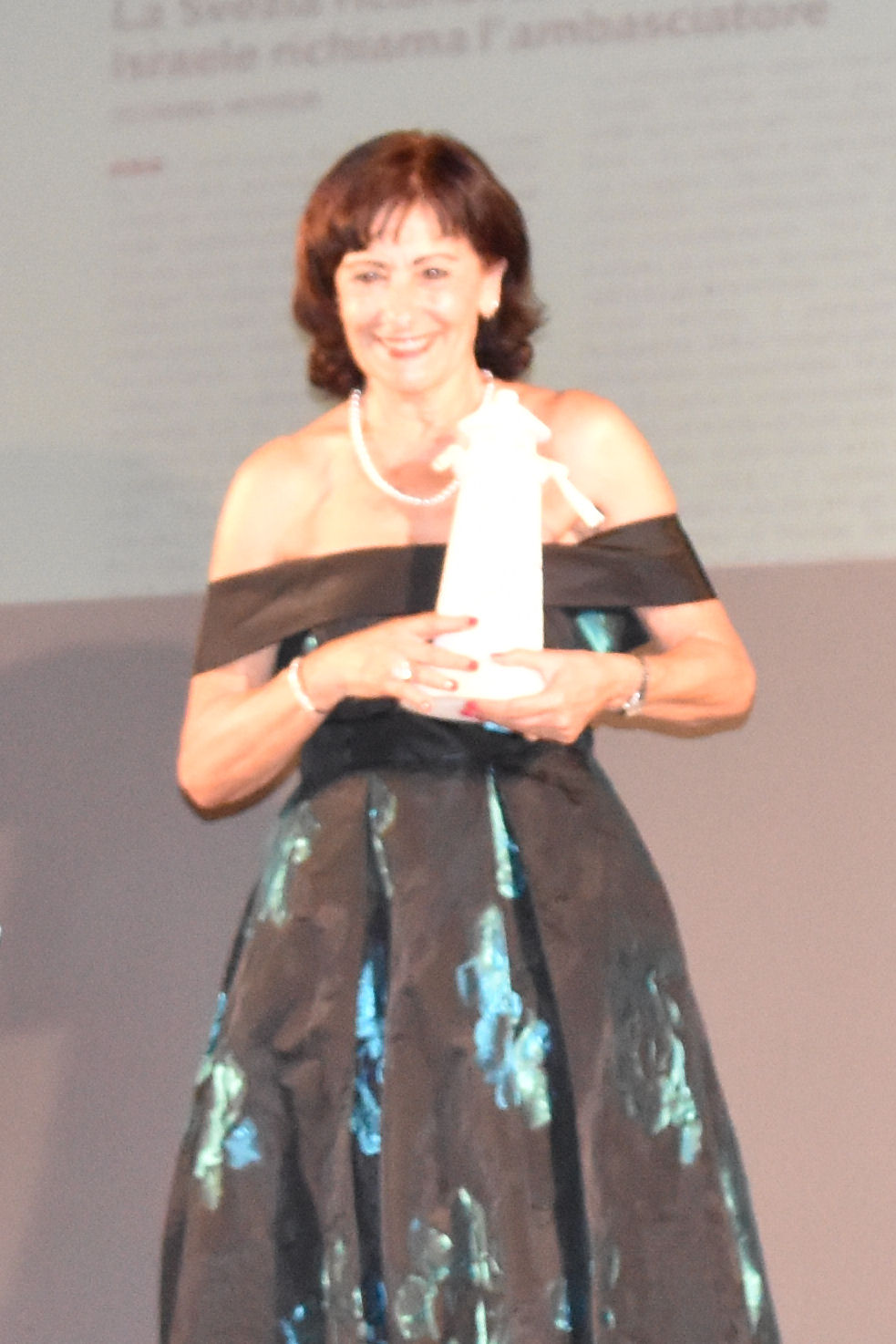
Maria Cristina Giongo - Otranto, 11 September 2016, winner of 'Premio Giornalisti del Mediterraneo, sezione terrorismo'

Maria Cristina Giongo (born Milan, 5 May 1951), is an Italian journalist and author.

She lives in Eindhoven, the Netherlands, where she works as a correspondent for Italian magazines. From 1976 until 1981 she presented a thousand broadcasts of a daily live-program for consumers, partly dedicated to interviews with well-known persons in politics, public health service, daily topics, fashion and beauty. She won a television prize for this program ('premio onda tivu'), in the category Actuality and talkshow. In 1997 she made a documentary about the use of drugs in the Netherlands with a team of the RAI, in cooperation with the UN. On 11 September 2016 she won the 'Premio Salento - Giornalisti del Mediterraneo - sezione terrorismo' for her article in the daily newspaper Libero: 'Ho dovuto uccidere mamma e sorella per salvarle dall'Isis'. She is a granddaughter of professor Franco Giongo, radiologist and 11 times Italian track and field athletics champion.

She was awarded the honor of "Cavaliere dell’Ordine della Stella d’Italia" (Knight of the Order of the Star of Italy) with the decree of 6 December 2022 published in the official gazette of the Quirinale, granted by the President of the Italian Republic, Sergio Mattarella.

== Magazines ==
She wrote hundreds of articles for daily papers as 'Il Giornale' and 'Libero' and for weekly papers as 'Il popolo lombardo' and 'Oggi', 'Novella 2000', 'Astra', 'Alba', 'Sette', 'Salve', 'Visto', 'Corriere Medico', from Rizzoli Rcs publishers. In these magazines appeared various interviews with, for example the Dutch politicians Geert Wilders and Jan-Peter Balkenende, Italian ambassadors in the Netherlands, Gaetano Cortese (2009), Franco Giordano (2011), Andrea Perugini (2017), Giorgio Novello (2021), political scientist Alexandre Del Valle, film producer and ambassador for Eurordis 2014 Sean Hepburn Ferrer (son of Audrey Hepburn), the Italian writers Niccolò Ammaniti and Umberto Eco, the actor Lino Banfi and the Italian singer-songwriters Al Bano, Roberto Vecchioni, Francesco Baccini, Giada Valenti and Toto Cutugno, the Italian ESA (European Space Agency) astronaut Luca Parmitano, the Formula 1 racing driver Jarno Trulli and also the Dutch clinical psychologist Jan Derksen. For the 'Corriere della Sera' she did an interview with Karol Wojtyła (later Pope John Paul II, canonized on 27 April 2014). An article of her meeting with him appeared in 'Avvenire' on the occasion of his beatification. She also wrote an article on the marriage of the heir to the Dutch throne Prince Willem-Alexander and Princess Máxima, as well as an article on the ordination of King Willem-Alexander and Queen Máxima. Won in Otranto (Puglia) the Salento award - Journalists of the Mediterranean – section terrorism, 11 September 2016, for the article published in the newspaper Libero: 'I had to kill mom and sister to save them from ISIS'. As a member of Pro Petri Sede Benelux she met Pope Francis on 10 February 2016 and from His hands she received the pontifical medal of the jubilee year of mercy. On February 24, 2023, she was received by Pope Francis in a private audience, together with some members of Pro Petri Sede, in the Sala Clementina located in the Apostolic Palace in the Vatican City.

== Bibliography ==
- 1986 - Caro piccolo baby, novel, Rusconi publishers, ISBN 88-18-19006-7 (in Italian)
- 1986 - La frase giusta per ogni circonstanza (3rd print), De Vecchi publishers(in Italian and Spanish)
- 2008 - Muriel, novel, Freemusketeers publishers, ISBN 978-90-484-0026-3) (in Dutch)
- 2020 - Mamma voglio morire, novel, Bertoni publishers, ISBN 978-8855-351263 (in Italian)
