= Karl Ekman =

Swedish wrestler

- Born: 1 January 1892; Vårgårda, Sweden
- Died: 9 December 1945 (aged 53); Stockholm, Sweden

Karl Sanfrid Ekman (1 January 1892 – 9 December 1945) was a Swedish wrestler. He competed in the light heavyweight event at the 1912 Summer Olympics.
