= Axel Tetens =

Danish wrestler (1892–1961)

- Born: 15 December 1892; Copenhagen, Denmark
- Died: 29 April 1961 (aged 68); Copenhagen, Denmark

Axel Gerhard Vilhelm Tetens (15 December 1892 – 29 April 1961) was a Danish wrestler. He competed at the 1920 and 1924 Summer Olympics.
