= Giuseppe Bernardoni =

Italian sprinter

Personal information
- Nationality: Italian
- Born: 7 September 1895 Como, Italy
- Died: 30 June 1942 (aged 46)

Sport
- Sport: Sprinting
- Event: 400 metres

Giuseppe Bernardoni (7 September 1895 – 30 June 1942) was an Italian sprinter. He competed in the Men's 400 metres at the 1920 Summer Olympics.
