= Andrea Gargano =

Italian wrestler (1883–1970)

- Full name: Amedeo Andrea Gargano
- Born: 27 March 1883; Genoa, Italy
- Died: 27 January 1970 (aged 86); Genoa, Italy

Amedeo Andrea Gargano (27 March 1883 – 27 January 1970) was an Italian wrestler. He competed at the 1912 Summer Olympics and the 1924 Summer Olympics.
