= Zavirre Carcereri =

Italian wrestler

- Born: 12 April 1876; Verona, Italy

Zavirre Annibale Carcereri (12 April 1876 – 4 June 1951) was an Italian wrestler. He competed in the middleweight event at the 1912 Summer Olympics.
