= Giuseppe Tugnoli =

Italian athlete

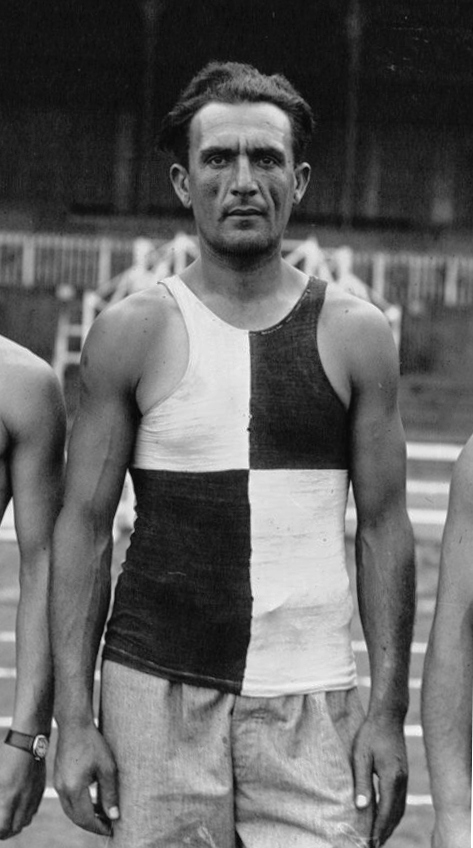
- Giuseppe Tugnoli in 1919

Personal information
- Born: 2 October 1888 Bologna, Italy
- Died: 2 September 1968 (aged 79)

Sport
- Sport: Athletics
- Event(s): Discus throw, javelin throw, shot put, high jump
- Club: Virtus Bologna

Achievements and titles
- Personal best(s): DT – 41.69 m (1914); JT – 56.24 m (1915); SP – 13.85 m (1910); HJ – 1.78 m (1916)

Giuseppe Tugnoli (2 October 1888 – 2 September 1968) was an Italian champion in the discus throw, javelin throw and shot put. He competed in the shot put at the 1920 Summer Olympics and placed 14th.

== National titles ==
Tugnoli won the national championships 12 times at senior level.

- Italian Athletics Championships
  - Shot put: 1913, 1914, 1920, 1923 (4)
  - Discus throw: 1914, 1922. 1923 (3)
  - Javelin throw: 1919 (1)
  - Stone put: 1913, 1914, 1919, 1920 (4)

== See also ==
- Men's high jump Italian record progression
