= Carlo Speroni =

Italian long-distance runner

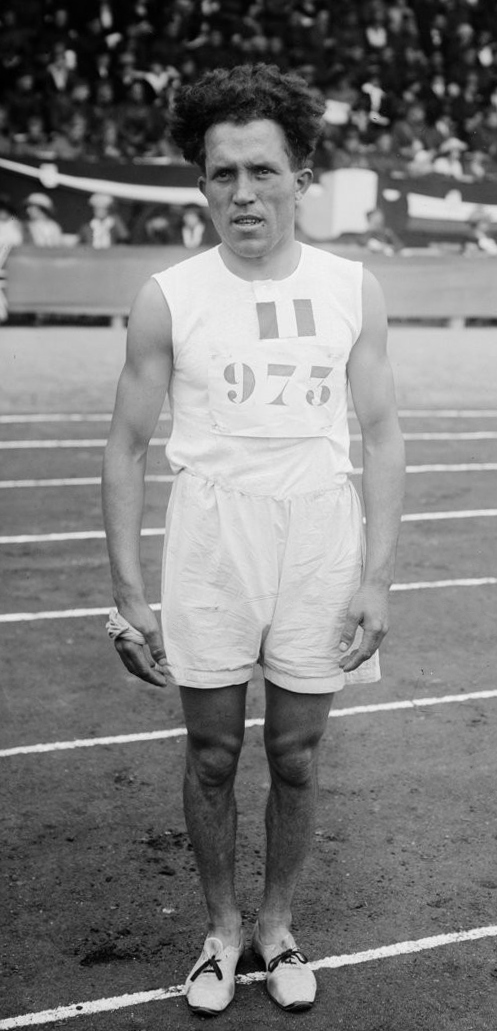
- Carlo Speroni in 1919

Personal information
- Nationality: Italian
- Born: 12 July 1899 Busto Arsizio, Italy
- Died: 12 October 1969 (aged 70)

Sport
- Country: Italy
- Sport: Athletics
- Events: Long distance running Marathon
- Club: US Busto Arsizio

Achievements and titles
- Personal bests: 5000 m: 15:24.6 (1919); 10000 m. 32:03.8 (1924); Marathon: 2:44:58 (1913)

Carlo Speroni (13 July 1895 – 12 October 1969) was an Italian long-distance runner.

== Biography ==
Speroni began competing at the age of 15 and took part in the 1912, 1920 and 1924 Summer Olympics. Nationally he won 12 titles: in the 5000 m (1920, 1921), 10,000 m (1914, 1920, 1921, 1924, 1925), half marathon (1912–1914) and cross country running (1913, 1915). In 1913 he set the Italian record over six miles that stood for 17 years.

In 1936 he became a masseur for the Pro Patria Calcio club, where he worked for 30 years. In 1971 the stadium Stadio Carlo Speroni was named after him.

== Olympic results ==
Year	Competition	Venue	Position	Event	Time	Notes
1912	Olympic Games	Stockholm, Sweden	DNF	Marathon	NT	
1920	Olympic Games	Antwerp, Belgium	7th	5000 metres	NT	
1920	Olympic Games	Antwerp, Belgium	Finals	10,000 metres	DNF	
1924	Olympic Games	Paris, France	DNF	10,000 metres	NT	

== See also ==
- Italy at the 1912 Summer Olympics
- Italy at the 1920 Summer Olympics
- Italy at the 1924 Summer Olympics
