= Edvin Fältström =

Swedish wrestler

- Born: 30 December 1890; Landskrona, Sweden
- Died: 26 July 1965 (aged 74); Malmö, Sweden

Edvin Fältström (30 December 1890 – 26 July 1965) was a Swedish wrestler. He competed at the 1912 and the 1920 Summer Olympics.
