= Bruto Testoni =

Italian wrestler

- Born: 1 July 1891; Bentivoglio, Emilia-Romagna
- Died: 7 June 1949 (aged 57); Bologna

Bruto Testoni (1 July 1891 – 7 June 1949) was an Italian wrestler. He competed at the 1920 and the 1924 Summer Olympics. In the 1910s, Testoni won nine national titles in the light-heavyweight division.
