= Émile Walhem =

Belgian wrestler

Émile Albert Walhem
- Born: 6 December 1894; Brussels, Belgium

Émile Albert Walhem (born 6 December 1894, date of death unknown) was a Belgian wrestler. He competed at the 1920 and the 1924 Summer Olympics.
