= František Tázler =

Czech wrestler

- Born: 9 June 1893; Plzeň
- Died: 27 May 1930 (aged 36); Plzeň

František Josef Tázler (9 June 1893 – 27 May 1930) was a Czech wrestler. He competed at the 1920 and the 1924 Summer Olympics.
