= Johan Salila =

Finnish wrestler (1884–1932)

- Born: 28 July 1884; Hollola, Finland
- Died: 12 August 1932 (aged 48); Helsinki, Finland

Johan Gustaf Salila (28 July 1884 – 12 August 1932) was a Finnish wrestler. He was born in Hollola. He competed at the 1912, 1920 and 1924 Summer Olympics. He won a gold medal at the 1921 World Wrestling Championships.
