= Joaquim Vital =

Portuguese wrestler

- Born: 24 August 1884; Lisbon, Portugal

Joaquim Vital (born 24 August 1884, date of death unknown) was a Portuguese wrestler. He competed in the middleweight event at the 1912 Summer Olympics, in Sweden.
