= Franco Giongo =

Italian sprinter (1891–1981)

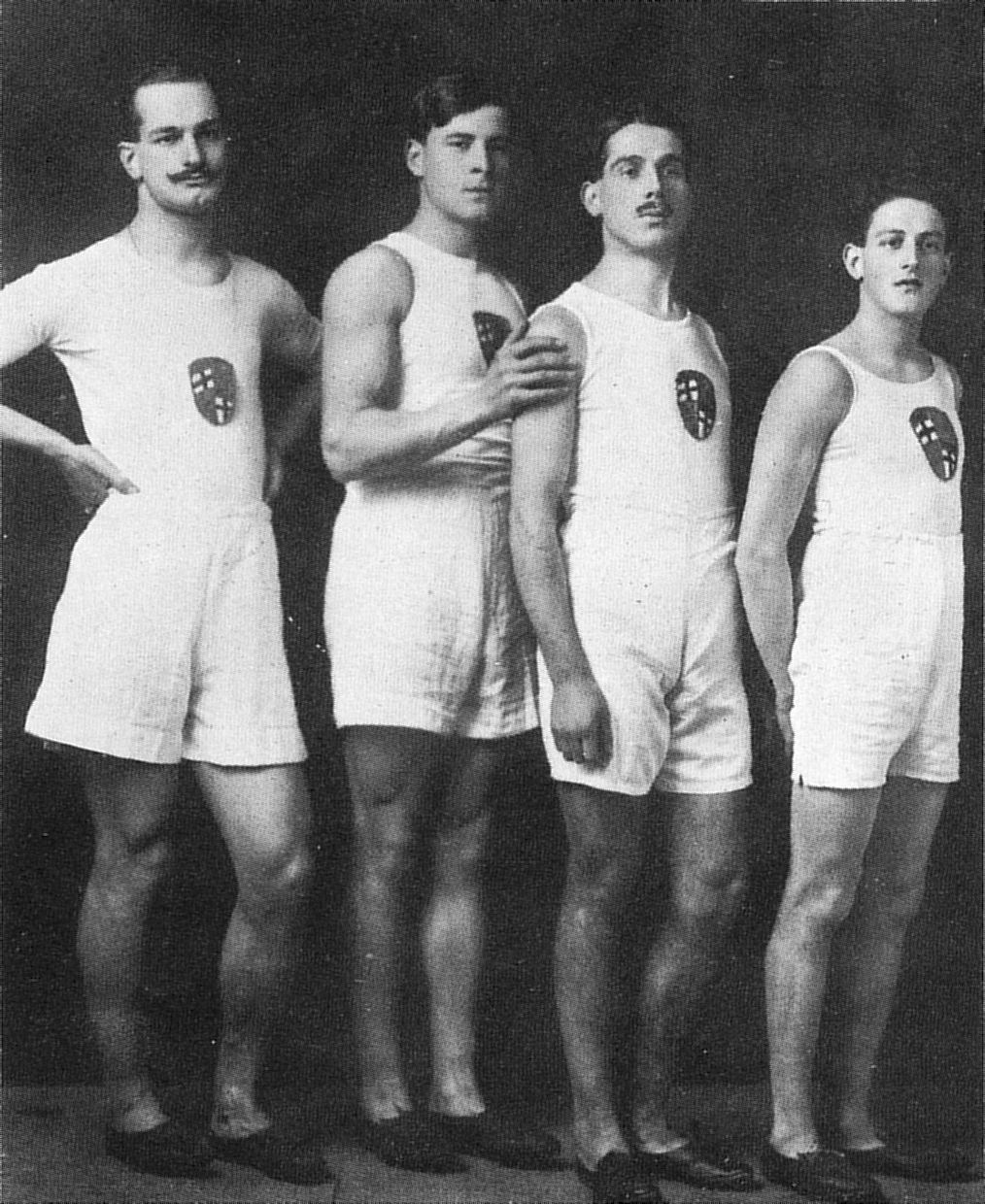
- Gionco in 1914 (first from left)

Personal information
- National team: Italy
- Born: 27 July 1891 Bologna, Italy
- Died: 28 December 1981 (aged 90) Bologna, Italy

Sport
- Sport: Athletics
- Event: Sprint
- Club: Atletic Club Torino

Achievements and titles
- Personal bests: 100 m: 10.8 (1923); 200 m: 21.7 (1914); 400 m: 50.4 (1914)

Franco Giongo (27 July 1891 in Bologna – 28 December 1981) was an Italian track and field athlete who competed in the 1912 Summer Olympics.

== Biography ==
In 1912 he was eliminated in the semi-finals of the 100 metres competition as well as of the 200 metres event. He also participated in the 400 metres competition and was eliminated in the first round. One of his granddaughters is the Italian reporter and writer Maria Cristina Giongo.

== National titles ==
Franco Giongo has won 11 times the individual national championship.

- 5 wins on 100 metres (1910, 1911, 1912, 1914, 1923)
- 2 wins on 200 metres (1914, 1923)
- 4 wins on 400 metres (1910, 1911, 1912, 1914)

== See also ==
- 100 metres winners of Italian Athletics Championships
