= Claes Johanson =

Swedish wrestler (1884–1949)

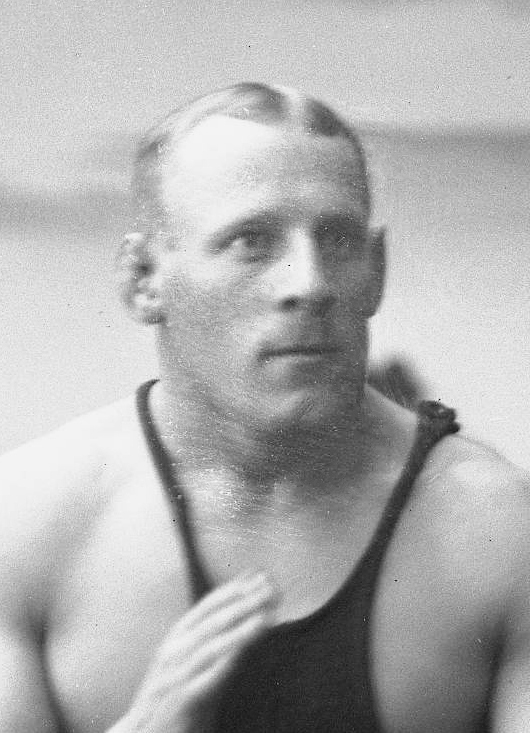
- Johanson in 1913

Personal information
- Born: 4 November 1884 Hyssna, Sweden
- Died: 9 March 1949 (aged 64) Gothenburg, Sweden

Sport
- Sport: Greco-Roman wrestling
- Club: Örgryte IS, Göteborg; Göteborgs AK
Medal record
Men's Greco-Roman wrestling
Representing Sweden
Olympic Games
Gold medal – first place	1912 Stockholm	Middleweight
Gold medal – first place	1920 Antwerp	Light heavyweight

Claes Edvin Johanson (4 November 1884 – 9 March 1949) was a Swedish wrestler who competed in the 1912, 1920 and 1924 Summer Olympics and won two gold medals, in 1912 and 1920. In 1913 he won the unofficial European Championships in the 75 kg division.
