= Béla Varga (wrestler) =

Hungarian wrestler (1888–1969)

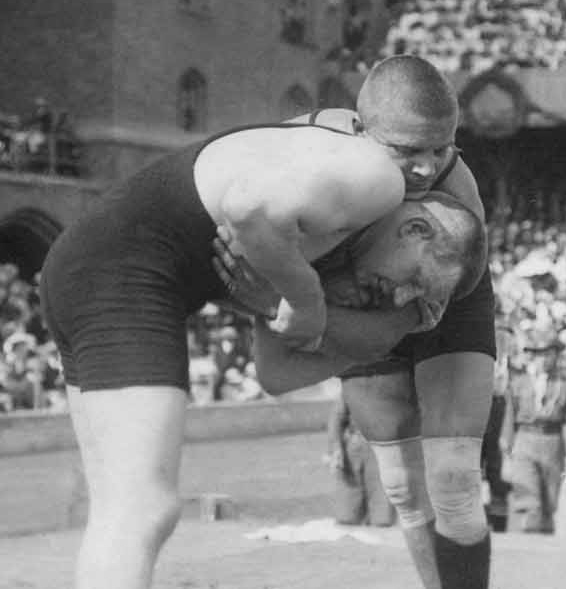
- Varga (right) vs. Anders Ahlgren at the 1912 Olympics

Personal information
- Born: 2 June 1888 Kiskunfélegyháza, Austria-Hungary
- Died: 4 April 1969 (aged 80) Budapest, Hungary

Sport
- Sport: Greco-Roman wrestling
- Club: BAK, Budapest; MAC, Budapest
Medal record
Men's Greco-Roman wrestling
Representing Hungary
Olympic Games
Bronze medal – third place	1912 Stockholm	Light heavyweight

Béla Varga (2 June 1888 – 4 April 1969) was a Hungarian wrestler who competed at the 1912 and 1924 Summer Olympics. He won the bronze medal in the light heavyweight class in 1912.
