= Anders Rajala =

Finnish wrestler (1891–1957)

- Full name: Anders August Rajala
- Born: 30 June 1891; Tampere, Finland
- Died: 7 March 1957 (aged 65); Tampere, Finland

Anders August Rajala (30 June 1891 – 7 March 1957) was a Finnish wrestler. He competed at the 1912 Summer Olympics and the 1920 Summer Olympics.
