= Finland at the 1912 Summer Olympics =

- The Grand Duchy of Finland had no official flag; the Russian flag was used for both countries at the Olympics
- IOC code: FIN
- NOC: Finnish Olympic Committee

in Stockholm
- Competitors: 164 (162 men, 2 women) in 10 sports
- Flag bearer: Eino Saastamoinen
- Medals Ranked 4th: Gold 9 Silver 8 Bronze 9 Total 26

Summer Olympics appearances (overview)
- 1908; 1912; 1920; 1924; 1928; 1932; 1936; 1948; 1952; 1956; 1960; 1964; 1968; 1972; 1976; 1980; 1984; 1988; 1992; 1996; 2000; 2004; 2008; 2012; 2016; 2020; 2024; 2028

Other related appearances
- 1906 Intercalated Games

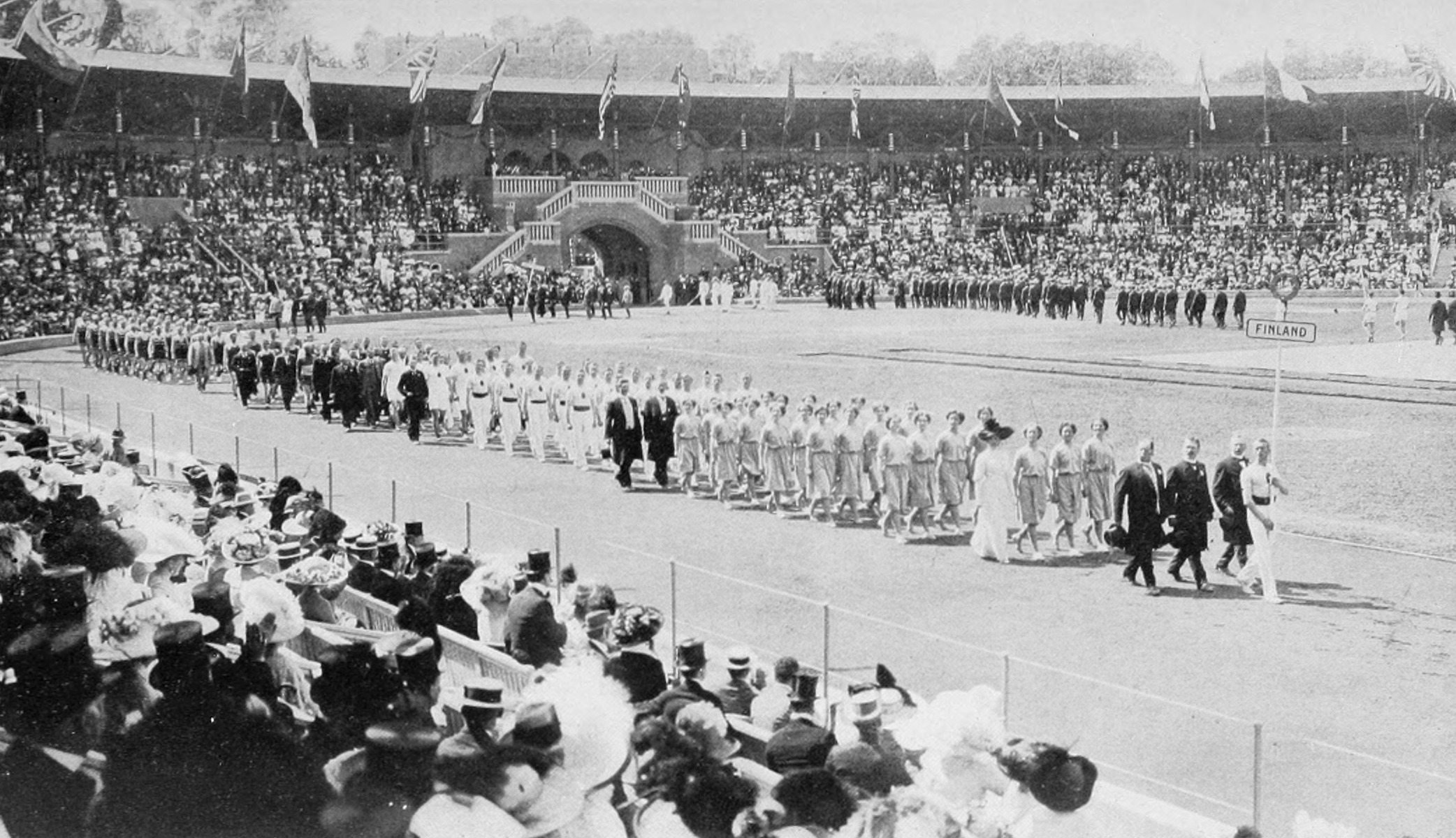
The team of Finland at the opening ceremony.

Finland competed at the 1912 Summer Olympics in Stockholm, Sweden. The Grand Duchy of Finland was an autonomous part of the Russian Empire at the time, which allowed Finland to compete separately of Russia at the 1908 Summer Olympics due to Finland's special status. During the opening ceremony, Finland's team paraded under the national insignia flag of a Swedish-speaking female gymnastics club in Helsinki. 164 competitors, 162 men and 2 women, took part in 49 events in 10 sports.

== Medalists ==
Medal	Name	Sport	Event
Gold	Hannes Kolehmainen	Athletics	Men's 10000m
Gold	Hannes Kolehmainen	Athletics	Men's 5000m
Gold	Hannes Kolehmainen	Athletics	Men's Individual Cross country
Gold	Armas Taipale	Athletics	Men's Discus throw
Gold	Armas Taipale	Athletics	Men's two handed discus throw
Gold	Julius Saaristo	Athletics	Men's two handed javelin throw
Gold	Yrjö Saarela	Wrestling	Greco-Roman heavyweight
Gold	Kaarlo Koskelo	Wrestling	Greco-Roman featherweight
Gold	Emil Väre	Wrestling	Greco-Roman lightweight
Silver	Hannes Kolehmainen; Jalmari Eskola; Albin Stenroos	Athletics	Cross country
Silver	Elmer Niklander	Athletics	Men's two handed discus throw
Silver	Julius Saaristo	Athletics	Men's Javelin throw
Silver	Väinö Siikaniemi	Athletics	Men's two handed javelin throw
Silver	Men's Team	Gymnastics	free system
Silver	Men's Team	Sailing	10m class
Silver	Johan Olin	Wrestling	Greco-Roman heavyweight
Silver	Ivar Böhling	Wrestling	Greco-Roman light heavyweight
Bronze	Albin Stenroos	Athletics	Men's 10000m
Bronze	Urho Peltonen	Athletics	Men's two handed javelin throw
Bronze	Elmer Niklander	Athletics	Men's two handed shot put
Bronze	Men's Team	Sailing	Men's 12m class
Bronze	Men's Team	Sailing	Men's 8m class
Bronze	Nestori Toivonen	Shooting	Men's 100m running deer, single shot
Bronze	Axel Fredrik Londen; Nestori Toivonen; Iivar Väänänen; Ernst Rosenqvist	Shooting	Men's Team 100m running deer, single shot
Bronze	Otto Lasanen	Wrestling	Greco-Roman featherweight
Bronze	Alfred Asikainen	Wrestling	Greco-Roman middleweight

== Team ==
Competitors from Finland per sport
Sport	Men
Athletics	23
Cycling	5
Diving	6
Football	15
Gymnastics	24
Rowing	6
Sailing	27
Shooting	19
Swimming	6
Wrestling	37
Total	164

== Aquatics ==
=== Diving ===
Six divers, all men, represented Finland. It was Finland's second appearance in diving, with both of the divers who had represented the nation in 1908 returning. Toivo Aro was the only Finnish diver to advance to the finals, doing so in both of his events. His fifth-place finish in the plain high diving was Finland's best performance to date, improving upon his own sixth-place finish in the 1908 platform competition.

Rankings given are within the diver's heat.

Men

Diver	Events	Heats		Final	
Diver	Events	Result	Rank	Result	Rank
Toivo Aro	10 m platform	62.75	3 q	57.05	8
Toivo Aro	Plain high dive	39.4	2 q	36.3	5
Tauno Ilmoniemi	Plain high dive	35	3	did not advance	
Kalle Kainuvaara	10 m platform	48.1	7	did not advance	
Kalle Kainuvaara	Plain high dive	33.2	3	did not advance	
Albert Nyman	Plain high dive	32	4	did not advance	
Leo Suni	10 m platform	48.93	9	did not advance	
Leo Suni	Plain high dive	32.1	5	did not advance	
Oscar Wetzell	3 m board	58.7	7	did not advance	
Oscar Wetzell	10 m platform	50.46	6	did not advance	
Oscar Wetzell	Plain high dive	33.8	2	did not advance	

=== Swimming ===
Six swimmers, including two women, competed for Finland at the 1912 Games. It was the second time the nation had competed in swimming, in which Finland had competed each time the nation appeared independently. Aaltonen had the best finish of the Games, finishing third in his 400-metre breaststroke final to barely miss qualification for the final.

Ranks given for each swimmer are within the heat.

Men

Swimmer	Events	Heat		Quarterfinal		Semifinal		Final	
Swimmer	Events	Result	Rank	Result	Rank	Result	Rank	Result	Rank
Arvo Aaltonen	200 m breaststroke	N/A		3:13.0	2 Q	3:17.0	6	did not advance	
Arvo Aaltonen	400 m breaststroke	N/A		6:48.8	2 Q	6:56.8	3	did not advance	
Herman Cederberg	200 m breaststroke	N/A		3:18.6	3	did not advance			
Vilhelm Lindgrén	200 m breaststroke	N/A		3:21.2	4	did not advance			
Vilhelm Lindgrén	400 m breaststroke	N/A		7:12.6	3	did not advance			
Lennart Lindroos	200 m breaststroke	N/A		3:16.6	3 q	3:11.6	4	did not advance	
Lennart Lindroos	400 m breaststroke	N/A		7:03.0	2 Q	7:02.4	4	did not advance	

Women

Swimmer	Events	Heat		Quarterfinal		Semifinal		Final	
Swimmer	Events	Result	Rank	Result	Rank	Result	Rank	Result	Rank
Tyyne Järvi	100 m freestyle	N/A		1:42.4	5	did not advance			
Regina Kari	100 m freestyle	N/A		Unknown	6	did not advance			

== Athletics ==
23 athletes represented Finland. It was the second appearance of the nation in athletics, as well as at the Olympics. The Finland athletics team finished with 6 gold medals, 4 silvers, and 3 bronzes—a great improvement over the single bronze Finland won in 1908.

Hannes Kolehmainen finished with the Olympic records in the 5000 and 10000 metres, as well as gold medals in both events and the individual cross country. Armas Taipale added another gold medal and Olympic record in the discus throw, bettering the new Olympic record that Elmer Niklander set and briefly held in the preliminary round; Taipale won a second gold in the two handed version of the discus. Julius Saaristo set an Olympic record in the javelin, though it was quickly surpassed; he finished with the silver medal. The Finns swept the medals in the two handed javelin throw, with Saaristo atop the standings.

Ranks given are within that athlete's heat for running events.

Athlete	Events	Heat		Semifinal		Final	
Athlete	Events	Result	Rank	Result	Rank	Result	Rank
Paavo Aho	Shot put	N/A		12.40	10	did not advance	
Paavo Aho	Shot put	N/A		23.30	6	did not advance	
Jalmari Eskola	Ind. cross country	N/A				46:54.8	4
Johan Halme	Triple jump	N/A		13.79	11	did not advance	
Johan Halme	Javelin throw	N/A		54.65	4	did not advance	
Johan Halme	Two hand javelin	N/A		88.54	9	did not advance	
Efraim Harju	1500 m	N/A		?	4	did not advance	
Efraim Harju	Ind. cross country	N/A				did not finish	
Väinö Heikkilä	Ind. cross country	N/A				54:08.0	25
Verner Järvinen	Discus throw	N/A		38.60	15	did not advance	
Verner Järvinen	Two hand discus	N/A		66.69	12	did not advance	
Franz Johansson	5000 m	N/A		15:31.4	3	did not start	
Franz Johansson	Ind. cross country	N/A				48:03.0	11
Arne Kallberg	Marathon	N/A				did not finish	
Hannes Kolehmainen	5000 m	N/A		15:38.9	1	14:36.6 OR	1st place, gold medalist(s)
Hannes Kolehmainen	10000 m	N/A		33:49.0 OR	1	31:20.8 OR	1st place, gold medalist(s)
Hannes Kolehmainen	Ind. cross country	N/A				45:15.6	1st place, gold medalist(s)
Tatu Kolehmainen	10000 m	N/A		32:47.8	1	did not finish	
Tatu Kolehmainen	Marathon	N/A				did not finish	
Emil Kukko	Long jump	N/A		6.11	24	did not advance	
Emil Kukko	Javelin throw	N/A		44.66	18	did not advance	
Emil Kukko	Pentathlon	N/A				Elim-4 35	12
Wilhelm Kyrönen	Ind. cross country	N/A				47:32.0	7
Arvo Laine	High jump	N/A		1.75	13	did not advance	
Aarne Lindholm	5000 m	N/A		did not finish		did not advance	
Aarne Lindholm	Ind. cross country	N/A				did not finish	
Jonni Myyrä	Javelin throw	N/A		51.33	8	did not advance	
Elmer Niklander	Shot put	N/A		13.65	4	did not advance	
Elmer Niklander	Discus throw	N/A		42.09 OR	4	did not advance	
Elmer Niklander	Two hand shot put	N/A		26.67	1	27.14	3rd place, bronze medalist(s)
Elmer Niklander	Two hand discus	N/A		72.05	3	77.96	2nd place, silver medalist(s)
Urho Peltonen	Javelin throw	N/A		49.20	9	did not advance	
Urho Peltonen	Two hand javelin	N/A		100.24	3	Not held	3rd place, bronze medalist(s)
Lauri Pihkala	800 m	did not finish		did not advance			
Julius Saaristo	Javelin throw	N/A		55.37 OR	2	58.66	2nd place, silver medalist(s)
Julius Saaristo	Two hand javelin	N/A		109.42	1	Not held	1st place, gold medalist(s)
Väinö Siikaniemi	Javelin throw	N/A		52.43	5	did not advance	
Väinö Siikaniemi	Two hand javelin	N/A		101.13	2	Not held	2nd place, silver medalist(s)
Albin Steinroos	10000 m	N/A		33:28.4	4	32:21.8	3rd place, bronze medalist(s)
Albin Steinroos	Ind. cross country	N/A				47:23.4	6
Armas Taipale	Discus throw	N/A		43.91 OR	1	45.21 OR	1st place, gold medalist(s)
Armas Taipale	Two hand discus	N/A		80.03	1	82.86	1st place, gold medalist(s)
Valdemar Wickholm	110 m hurdles	16.6	2	16.6	2	did not advance	
Valdemar Wickholm	Decathlon	N/A				7058.795	7
Jalmari Eskola; Hannes Kolehmainen; Albin Stenroos	Team cross country	N/A				11	2nd place, silver medalist(s)
Efraim Harju; Franz Johansson; Hannes Kolehmainen; Aarne Lindholm; Albin Stenroos	3000 m team	N/A		12	2	did not advance	

== Cycling ==
Five cyclists represented Finland. It was the first appearance of the nation in cycling. Antti Raita had the best time in the time trial, the only race held, placing 6th. The four Finnish cyclists who finished had a combined time that placed them 5th of the 15 teams.

=== Road cycling ===
Cyclist	Events	Final	
Cyclist	Events	Result	Rank
Johannes Jaakonaho	Ind. time trial	did not finish	
Juhani Kankkonen	Ind. time trial	11:41:35.5	34
Antti Raita	Ind. time trial	11:02:20.3	6
Wilho Tilkanen	Ind. time trial	11:28:38.5	21
Frans Väre	Ind. time trial	11:21:29.2	66
Juhani Kankkonen; Antti Raita; Wilho Tilkanen; Frans Väre	Team time trial	46:34:03.5	5

== Football ==
First round

1912-06-29

Italy	2 – 3 (a.e.t.)	Finland
Bontadini 10'; Sardi 25'		Öhman 2'; Soinio 40'; Wiberg 105'

Traneberg Stadium, Stockholm
Attendance: 600

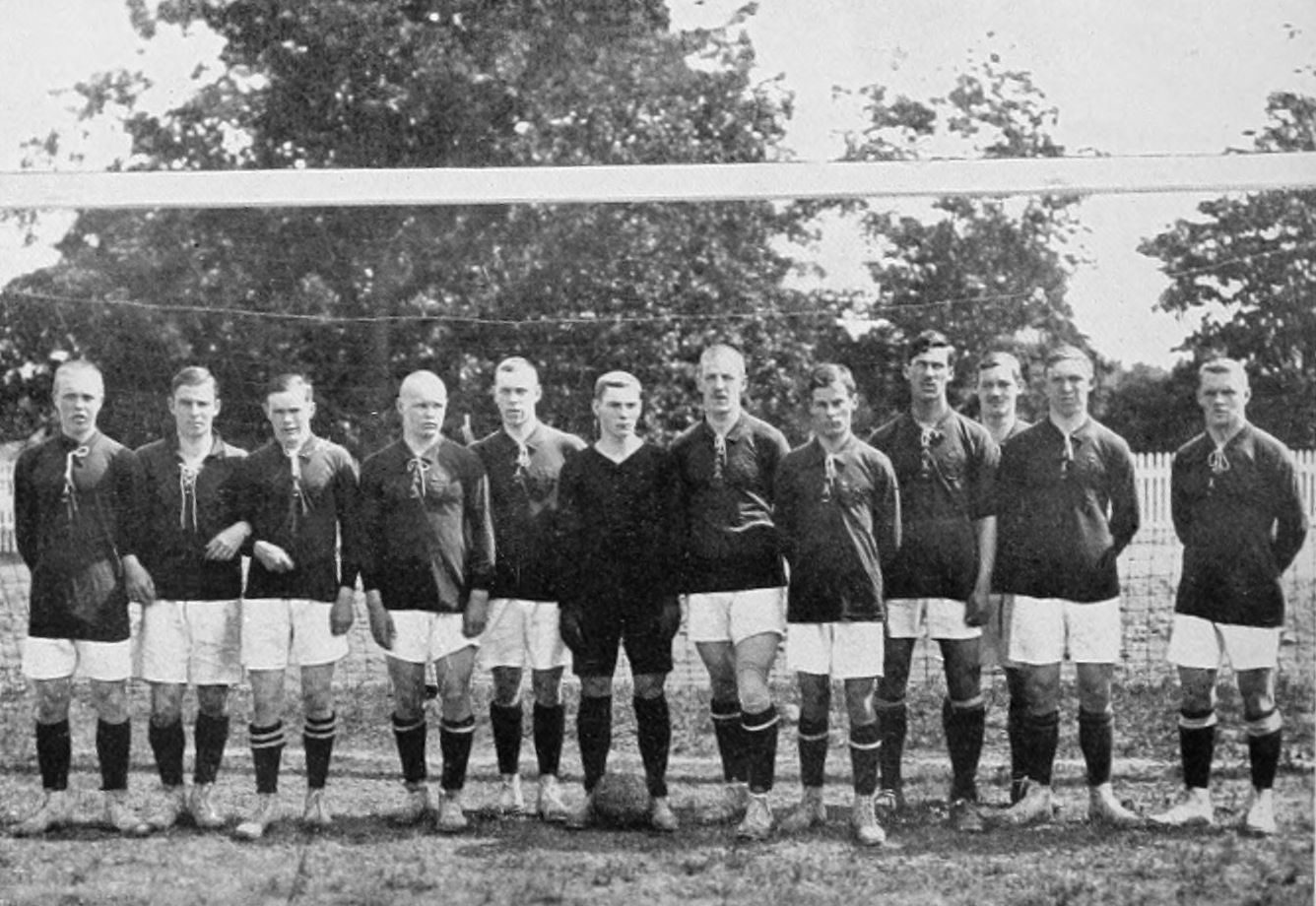
Finland squad

Quarterfinals

1912-06-30

Finland	2 – 1	Russia
Wiberg 30'; Öhman 80'		Butusov 72'

Traneberg Stadium, Stockholm
Attendance: 300

Semifinals

1912-07-02

Great Britain	4 – 0	Finland
Walden 7' 77'; Holopainen 2' (o.g.); Woodward 82'

Olympiastadion, Stockholm
Attendance: 4,000

Bronze medal match

1912-07-04

Netherlands	9 – 0	Finland
Vos 29' 43' 46' 74' 78' van der Sluis 24' 57' de Groot 28' 86'

Råsunda Stadium, Stockholm
Attendance: 1,000

Final rank
4th place

== Gymnastics ==
Twenty-four gymnasts represented Finland. It was the second appearance of the nation in gymnastics, in which Finland had competed at its only prior Olympic appearance. The Finnish team placed second in the team free system event; this silver medal was Finland's best gymnastics result to date, improving upon the bronze medal the team had won in 1908.

=== Artistic ===
Gymnast	Events	Final	
Gymnast	Events	Result	Rank
Kaarlo Ekholm	All-around	did not finish	
Karl Jansson	All-around	103.00	31
Villiam Nieminen	All-around	105.75	27
Anders Tamminen	All-around	90.50	37
Yrjö Vuolio	All-around	did not finish	
Finland	Team, free system	21.85	2nd place, silver medalist(s)

== Rowing ==
Six rowers represented Finland. It was the nation's first appearance in rowing.

(Ranks given are within each crew's heat.)

Rower	Event	Heats		Quarterfinals		Semifinals		Final	
Rower	Event	Result	Rank	Result	Rank	Result	Rank	Result	Rank
Axel Haglund	Single sculls	Unknown	2	did not advance					
Oskar Forsman; Valdemar Henriksson (cox); Karl Lönnberg; Johan Nyholm; Emil Nylund	Coxed four	7:18.2	1 Q	7:12.5	2	did not advance			

== Sailing ==
Twenty seven sailors represented Finland. It was the nation's first appearance in sailing. The Finns took three medals, but were unable to a win any gold medals.

(7 points for 1st in each race, 3 points for 2nd, 1 point for 3rd. Race-off to break ties in total points if necessary for medal standings.)

Sailors	Event	Race 1			Race 2			Total		
Sailors	Event	Time	Points	Rank	Time	Points	Rank	Points	Race-off	Rank
Ernst Estlander; Torsten Sandelin; Gunnar Stenbäck	6 metre class	2:39:33	0	4	2:31:02	0	6	0	N/A	5
Arthur Ahnger; Emil Lindh; Bertil Tallberg; Gunnar Tallberg; Georg Westling	8 metre class	2:21:03	0	5	2:14:50	3	2	3	2:27:41	3rd place, bronze medalist(s)
Curt Andstén; Jarl Andstén; Carl Girsén; Gustaf Estlander; Bertel Juslén	8 metre class	2:17:28	1	3	2:14:54	1	3	2	N/A	4
Waldemar Björkstén; Jacob Björnström; Bror Brenner; Allan Franck; Emil Lindh; Adolf Pekkalainen; Harry Wahl	10 metre class	3:59:07	3	2	3:50:09	1	3	4	4:21:41	2nd place, silver medalist(s)
Max Alfthan; Erik Hartvall; Jarl Hulldén; Sigurd Juslén; Ernst Krogius; Eino Sandelin; Johan Silén	12 metre class	3:25:45	1	3	3:48:55	1	3	2	N/A	3rd place, bronze medalist(s)

== Shooting ==
Nineteen shooters represented Finland. It was the nation's second appearance in shooting, in which Finland had competed each time the nation appeared at the Olympics independently. The Finns won two bronze medals in the running deer competitions—an individual medal for Toivonen and a team medal.

Shooter	Event	Final	
Shooter	Event	Result	Rank
Jalo Autonen	300 m free rifle, 3 pos.	776	59
Carl Bacher	Trap	13	45
Emil Collan	Trap	38	29
Emil Fabritius	Trap	11	53
Karl Fazer	Trap	86	12
Emil Holm	300 m free rifle, 3 pos.	835	49
Robert Huber	Trap	38	29
Heikki Huttunen	300 m free rifle, 3 pos.	906	25
Heikki Huttunen	50 m pistol	424	28
Lauri Kolho	300 m free rifle, 3 pos.	787	57
Voitto Kolho	300 m free rifle, 3 pos.	923	13
Axel Fredrik Londen	100 m deer, single shots	31	15
Gustaf Nyman	300 m free rifle, 3 pos.	913	19
Karl Reilin	100 m deer, single shots	26	26
Ernst Rosenqvist	100 m deer, single shots	32	14
Gustaf Schnitt	Trap	88	4
Nestori Toivonen	300 m free rifle, 3 pos.	did not finish	
Nestori Toivonen	100 m deer, single shots	41	3rd place, bronze medalist(s)
Huvi Tuiskunen	300 m free rifle, 3 pos.	875	39
Huvi Tuiskunen	100 m deer, single shots	28	21
Iivar Väänänen	100 m deer, single shots	28	21
Vilho Vauhkonen	300 m free rifle, 3 pos.	870	41
Axel Fredrik Londen; Ernst Rosenqvist; Nestori Toivonen; Iivar Väänänen	100 m team deer, single shots	123	3rd place, bronze medalist(s)
Carl Bacher; Emil Collan; Karl Fazer; Robert Huber; Axel Fredrik Londen; Gustaf Schnitt	Team clay pigeons	233	5
Emil Holm; Heikki Huttunen; Voitto Kolho; Gustaf Nyman; Huvi Tuiskunen; Vilho Vauhkonen	Team free rifle	5323	5

== Wrestling ==
=== Greco-Roman ===
Finland, competing independently in the Olympics for the second time, sent 37 wrestlers for its second Olympic wrestling appearance. The country was the most successful in the sport, taking seven of 15 medals. The Finns took the top spot in four of the five weight classes (three gold medals and a silver in the class in which no gold was awarded). They compiled a record of 118–64 (112-58 excluding matches pitting two Finnish wrestlers against each other) in the elimination rounds and 8-5-1 (6-3-1 against non-Finns) in the medal rounds.

Koskelo and Väre were the best performers, cruising through their respective weight classes without losses to take gold medals.

Saarela and Olin suffered losses only to other Finns in the heavyweight. Olin was beaten by Viljaama in the elimination rounds, but gave Saarela the latter's only loss of the tournament one round later. The two met again in the final, with Saarela winning the rematch to take the gold medal while Olin received silver.

Böhling made it through the elimination rounds undefeated, and won his match against Varga in the medals round to advance to the final against Ahlgren. The two wrestlers competed for nine hours without either being able to take a win; the match was declared drawn and both wrestlers received silver medals. No gold medal was given in the weight class.

Asikainen's only elimination round loss came in a double-disqualification against eventual gold medalist Johansson. In the medal round, he faced Klein in a bout that lasted 11 hours and 40 minutes. Neither wrestler was able to continue after this grueling match, so Asikainen's loss in it led to him taking the bronze medal, and Klein the silver, while the Swede Johansson walked over against first Asikainen and then Klein to take the gold.

Wrestler	Class	First round	Second round	Third round	Fourth round	Fifth round	Sixth round	Seventh round	Final			
Wrestler	Class	Opposition Result	Opposition Result	Opposition Result	Opposition Result	Opposition Result	Opposition Result	Opposition Result	Match A Opposition Result	Match B Opposition Result	Match C Opposition Result	Rank
Karl Åberg	Middleweight	Steputat (GER); W	Kurz (GER); W	Merkle (GER); W	Miskey (HUN); W	Holm (FIN); W	Klein (RUS); L	Johansson (SWE); L	did not advance			4
Alfred Asikainen	Middleweight	Bacon (GBR); W	Bacon (GBR); W	Victal (POR); W	Andersson (SWE); W	Johansson (SWE); L	Sint (NED); W	Bye	Klein (RUS); L	Johansson (SWE); DNS	Did not advance	3rd place, bronze medalist(s)
Emil Backenius	Heavyweight	Bonneveld (NED); L	Gerstmans (BEL); W	Barrett (GBR); W	Pelander (FIN); W	Jensen (DEN); L	Did not advance	N/A	did not advance			6
Ivar Böhling	Light heavyweight	Martin (FRA); W	Gross (GER); W	Oehler (GER); W	Arpe (ITA); W	Christensen (DEN); W	Lange (GER); W	N/A	Bye	Varga (HUN); W	Ahlgren (SWE); Draw	2nd place, silver medalist(s)
Lauri Haapanen	Featherweight	Pereira (POR); W	Szoszky (HUN); W	Hetmar (DEN); W	Gerstäcker (GER); L	Bye	Öberg (SWE); L	did not advance				6
Mikko Holm	Middleweight	Merkle (GER); L	Andersen (DEN); W	Kurz (GER); W	Johansson (SWE); W	Åberg (FIN); L	did not advance					7
August Jokinen	Middleweight	Gundersen (NOR); W	Polis (RUS); W	Carcereri (ITA); W	Kokotowitsch (AUT); W	Fältström (SWE); W	Johansson (SWE); L	Klein (RUS); L	did not advance			4
Karl Kangas	Featherweight	Ankondinow (RUS); W	Larsson (SWE); L	Pongrácz (HUN); W	Beckman (SWE); W	Gerstäcker (GER); W	Koskelo (FIN); L	did not advance				6
David Kolehmainen	Lightweight	Olsen (NOR); W	Eillenbrecht (NED); W	Björklund (SWE); W	Lund (SWE); L	Heckel (GER); W	Kaplur (RUS); L	did not advance				6
Kaarlo Koskelo	Featherweight	Rauss (AUT); W	Hansen (DEN); W	Schärer (AUT); W	Andersson (SWE); W	Hetmar (DEN); W	Kangas (FIN); W	Bye	Bye	Lasanen (FIN); W	Gerstäcker (GER); W	1st place, gold medalist(s)
Oskar Kumpu	Light heavyweight	Arpe (ITA); L	Oehler (GER); L	did not advance				N/A	did not advance			20
Otto Laitinen	Lightweight	Svenson (SWE); W	Fischer (AUT); W	Halík (BOH); W	Radvány (HUN); L	Did not start	did not advance					16
Otto Lasanen	Featherweight	Beckman (SWE); W	Persson (SWE); W	Gullaksen (NOR); W	Larsson (SWE); W	Johansson (SWE); L	Leivonen (FIN); W	Öberg (SWE); W	Gerstäcker (GER); L	Koskelo (FIN); L	Did not advance	3rd place, bronze medalist(s)
Hjalmar Lehmusvirta	Featherweight	Cockings (GBR); W	Ciai (ITA); W	Hestdahl (NOR); W	Rauss (AUT); W	Öberg (SWE); L	Gerstäcker (GER); L	did not advance				6
Kaarlo Leivonen	Featherweight	Ciai (ITA); W	Cockings (GBR); W	Öberg (SWE); W	Beránek (BOH); W	Larsson (SWE); W	Lasanen (FIN); L	Gerstäcker (GER); L	did not advance			4
Gustaf Lind	Light heavyweight	Pétursson (ISL); L	Arpe (ITA); L	did not advance				N/A	did not advance			20
Karl Lind	Light heavyweight	Løvold (NOR); W	Gardini (ITA); L	Ahlgren (SWE); L	did not advance			N/A	did not advance			16
Knut Lindberg	Light heavyweight	Lange (GER); W	Ekman (SWE); W	Varga (HUN); L	Nilsson (SWE); W	Ahlgren (SWE); L	Did not advance	N/A	did not advance			6
Adolf Lindfors	Heavyweight	Sandberg (SWE); W	Jensen (DEN); L	Bye	Neser (GER); L	did not advance		N/A	did not advance			7
Fridolf Lundstein	Middleweight	Melin (SWE); W	Bacon (GBR); W	Andersson (SWE); W	Johansson (SWE); L	Sint (NED); L	did not advance					7
Risto Mustonen	Featherweight	Hetmar (DEN); L	Gerstäcker (GER); L	did not advance								26
Johan Olin	Heavyweight	Paoli (FRA); W	Lindstrand (SWE); W	Neser (GER); W	Viljaama (FIN); L	Saarela (FIN); W	Bye	N/A	Bye	Jensen (DEN); W	Saarela (FIN); L	2nd place, silver medalist(s)
Gustaf Pelander	Heavyweight	Karlsson (SWE); W	Sandberg (SWE); W	Jensen (DEN); L	Backenius (FIN); L	did not advance		N/A	did not advance			7
Tuomas Pukkila	Lightweight	Covre (ITA); L	Hayes (GBR); W	Heckel (GER); L	did not advance							23
Anders Rajala	Light heavyweight	Gross (GER); W	Nagel (DEN); W	Arpe (ITA); W	Pétursson (ISL); L	Eriksen (DEN); W	Varga (HUN); L	N/A	did not advance			4
Yrjö Saarela	Heavyweight	Karlsson (SWE); W	Hauptmanns (GER); W	Lindstrand (SWE); W	Jensen (DEN); W	Olin (FIN); L	Neser (GER); W	N/A	Jensen (DEN); W	Bye	Olin (FIN); W	1st place, gold medalist(s)
Johan Salila	Light heavyweight	Fogelmark (SWE); W	Pétursson (ISL); L	Eriksen (DEN); L	did not advance			N/A	did not advance			16
Johan Salonen	Lightweight	Bouffechoux (FRA); W	Baumann (RUS); W	Kaplur (RUS); L	Frydenlund (NOR); W	Nilsson (SWE); L	did not advance					11
Aatami Tanttu	Lightweight	Eillenbrecht (NED); W	Olsen (NOR); W	Lund (SWE); W	Heckel (GER); L	Kaplur (RUS); L	did not advance					11
Paul Tirkkonen	Lightweight	Stejskal (AUT); W	Malmström (SWE); L	Did not start	did not advance							29
Teodor Tirkkonen	Middleweight	Rhys (GBR); W	Johansson (SWE); L	Johansson (SWE); W	Sint (NED); L	did not advance						11
Johan Urvikko	Lightweight	Malmström (SWE); L	Stejskal (AUT); W	Orosz (HUN); W	Hansen (DEN); L	did not advance						17
Emil Väre	Lightweight	Baumann (RUS); W	Bouffechoux (FRA); W	Covre (ITA); W	Kaplur (RUS); W	Balej (BOH); W	Malmström (SWE); W	Bye	Mathiasson (SWE); W	Bye	Malmström (SWE); W	1st place, gold medalist(s)
Kalle Viljaama	Heavyweight	Hauptmanns (GER); W	Paoli (FRA); W	Bonneveld (NED); W	Olin (FIN); W	Neser (GER); L	Did not start	N/A	did not advance			5
Emil Westerlund	Middleweight	Dahlberg (SWE); W	Frank (SWE); L	Sint (NED); W	Totuschek (AUT); W	Klein (RUS); L	did not advance					7
Oscar Wiklund	Light heavyweight	Eriksen (DEN); W	Varga (HUN); W	Pétursson (ISL); W	Lange (GER); L	Did not start	Did not advance	N/A	did not advance			10
Volmar Wikström	Lightweight	Lesieur (FRA); W	Rydström (SWE); W	Mathiasson (SWE); W	Nilsson (SWE); W	Malmström (SWE); L	Lund (SWE); L	did not advance				6
