= Germany at the 1912 Summer Olympics =

- Flag of the German Empire
- IOC code: GER
- NOC: German Imperial Commission for the Olympic Games

in Stockholm
- Competitors: 185 (180 men, 5 women) in 14 sports
- Flag bearer: Karl Halt
- Medals Ranked 6th: Gold 5 Silver 13 Bronze 7 Total 25

Summer Olympics appearances (overview)
- 1896; 1900; 1904; 1908; 1912; 1920–1924; 1928; 1932; 1936; 1948; 1952; 1956–1988; 1992; 1996; 2000; 2004; 2008; 2012; 2016; 2020; 2024

Other related appearances
- 1906 Intercalated Games –––– Saar (1952); United Team of Germany (1956–1964); East Germany (1968–1988); West Germany (1968–1988)

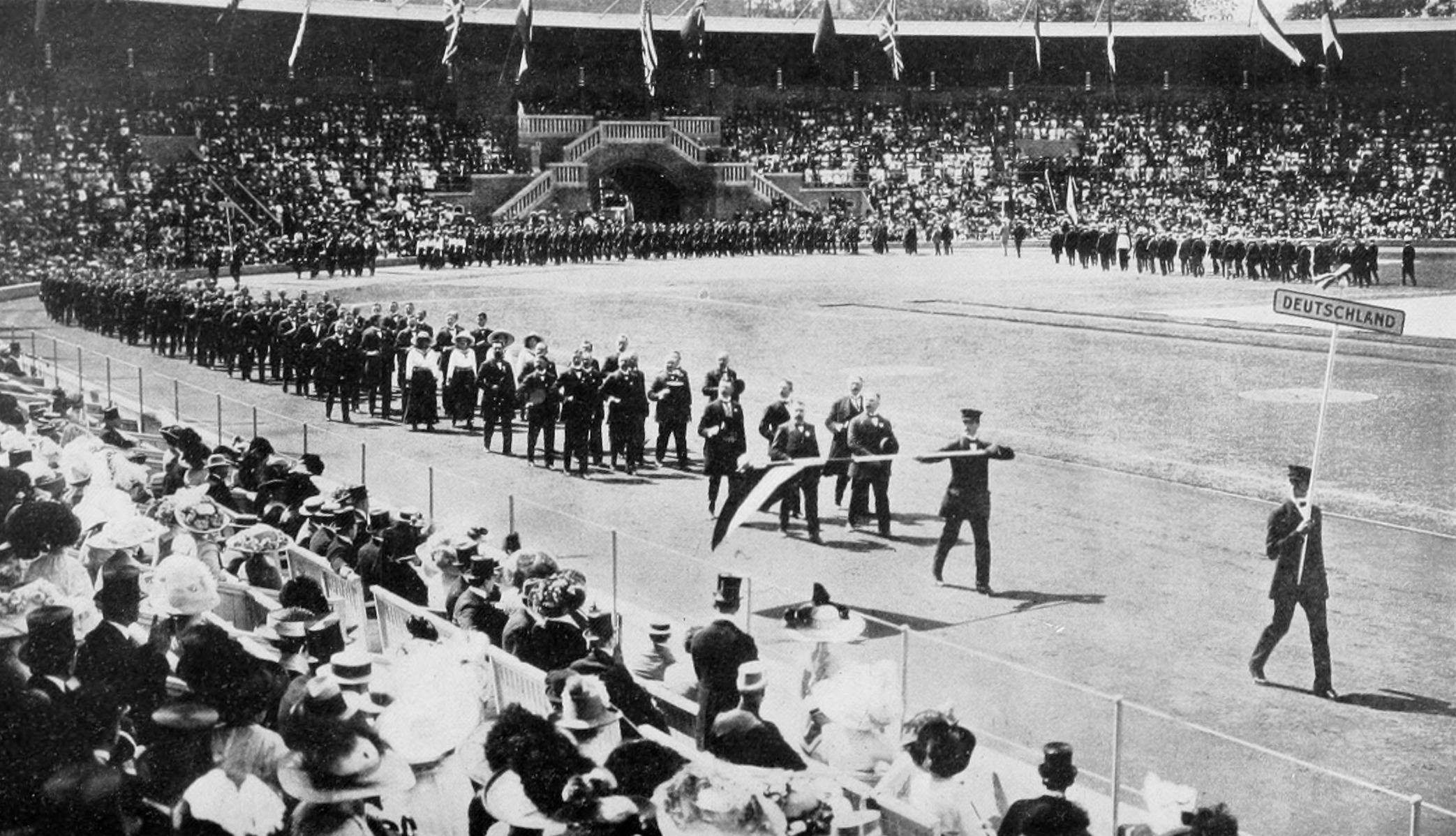
The team of Germany at the opening ceremony.

Germany competed at the 1912 Summer Olympics in Stockholm, Sweden. 185 competitors, 180 men and 5 women, took part in 69 events in 14 sports. Due to the political fallout from World War I, this was the country's last appearance until 1928.

== Medalists ==
=== Gold ===
- Paul Günther — Diving, Men's 3 m Springboard
- Albert Arnheiter, Hermann Wilker, Otto Fickeisen, Rudolf Fickeisen and Karl Leister — Rowing, Men's coxed fours
- Walter Bathe — Swimming, Men's 200 m breaststroke
- Walter Bathe — Swimming, Men's 400 m breaststroke
- Dorothea Köring and Heinrich Schomburgk — Tennis, Mixed doubles outdoor

=== Silver ===
- Hanns Braun — Athletics, Men's 400 m
- Hans Liesche — Athletics, Men's high jump
- Albert Zürner — Diving, Men's 10 m Platform
- Hans Luber — Diving, Men's 3 m Springboard
- Friedrich von Rochow — Equestrian, Individual eventing
- Friedrich von Rochow, Richard Graf von Schaesberg-Tannheim, Eduard von Lütcken and Carl von Moers — Equestrian, Team eventing
- Rabod von Kröcher — Equestrian, Individual jumping
- Alfred Goeldel — Shooting, Men's Trap
- Otto Fahr — Swimming, Men's 100 m backstroke
- Wilhelm Lützow — Swimming, Men's 200 m breaststroke
- Wally Dressel, Louise Otto, Hermine Stindt and Grete Rosenberg — Swimming, Women's 4 × 100 m freestyle relay
- Dorothea Köring — Tennis, Women's singles outdoor
- Georg Gerstäcker — Wrestling, Greco-Roman featherweight

=== Bronze ===
- Kurt Behrens — Diving, Men's 3 m Springboard
- Sigismund Freyer, Wilhelm Graf von Hohenau, Ernst Deloch and Prince Friedrich Karl of Prussia — Equestrian, Team jumping
- Otto Liebing, Max Bröske, Fritz Bartholomae, Willi Bartholomae, Werner Dehn, Rudolf Reichelt, Hans Matthiae, Kurt Runge and Max Vetter — Rowing, Men's eights
- Erich Graf von Bernstorff, Franz von Zedlitz und Leipe, Horst Goeldel, Albert Preuß, Erland Koch and Alfred Goeldel — Shooting, Men's Team clay pigeons
- Paul Kellner — Swimming, Men's 100 m backstroke
- Paul Malisch — Swimming, Men's 200 m breaststroke
- Oscar Kreuzer — Tennis, Men's singles outdoor

== Aquatics ==
=== Swimming ===
17 swimmers, including four women, competed for Germany at the 1912 Games. It was the fourth time the nation had competed in swimming, having missed only the 1896 swimming events.

The German men took six medals, four in breaststroke events and two in backstroke. The breaststroke trio swept the 200 meter breaststroke medals, and Bathe added a second gold medal in the 400 meter event. The four women took silver in the inaugural women's relay event. None of the women won an individual medal, with Rosenberg finishing 0.2 seconds behind the bronze medalist in the final to take fourth place.

Ranks given for each swimmer are within the heat.

Men

Swimmer	Events	Heat		Quarterfinal		Semifinal		Final	
Swimmer	Events	Result	Rank	Result	Rank	Result	Rank	Result	Rank
Walter Bathe	200 m breaststroke	N/A		3:03.4 OR	1 Q	3:02.2 OR	1 Q	3:01.8 OR	1st place, gold medalist(s)
Walter Bathe	400 m breaststroke	N/A		6:34.6 OR	1 Q	6:32.0 OR	1 Q	6:29.6 OR	1st place, gold medalist(s)
Walther Binner	100 m freestyle	Unknown	4–6	did not advance					
Kurt Bretting	100 m freestyle	1:07.0	2 Q	1:04.2	1 Q	1:04.6	1 Q	1:05.8	4
Otto Fahr	100 m backstroke	N/A		1:22.0	1 Q	1:21.8	2 Q	1:22.4	2nd place, silver medalist(s)
Otto Groß	100 m backstroke	N/A		1:24.0	2 Q	1:26.0	1 Q	1:25.8	5
Paul Kellner	100 m backstroke	N/A		1:26.0	2 Q	1:26.2	2 Q	1:24.0	3rd place, bronze medalist(s)
Georg Kunisch	100 m freestyle	Unknown	5	did not advance					
Wilhelm Lützow	200 m breaststroke	N/A		3:07.4 OR	1 Q	3:04.4	2 Q	3:05.0	2nd place, silver medalist(s)
Wilhelm Lützow	400 m breaststroke	N/A		6:49.8	1 Q	6:44.6	1 Q	did not finish	
Paul Malisch	200 m breaststroke	N/A		3:08.8	1 Q	3:09.6	1 Q	3:08.0	3rd place, bronze medalist(s)
Paul Malisch	400 m breaststroke	N/A		6:47.0 OR	1 Q	6:47.6	2 Q	6:37.0	4
Walter Ramme	100 m freestyle	1:10.2	1 Q	1:07.8	2 Q	1:05.8	2 Q	1:06.4	5
Max Ritter	100 m freestyle	1:08.0	2 Q	1:08.8	3	did not advance			
Max Ritter	400 m freestyle	N/A		5:44.6	1 Q	did not start		did not advance	
Oscar Schiele	100 m freestyle	N/A		5:57.0	3	did not advance			
Oscar Schiele	100 m backstroke	N/A		Disqualified		did not advance			
Erich Schultze	100 m backstroke	N/A		1:27.2	2 Q	Unknown	5	did not advance	
Kurt Bretting; Georg Kunisch; Max Ritter; Oscar Schiele	4 × 200 m free relay	N/A				10:42.2	2 Q	10:37.0	4

Women

Swimmer	Events	Heat		Quarterfinal		Semifinal		Final	
Swimmer	Events	Result	Rank	Result	Rank	Result	Rank	Result	Rank
Wally Dressel	100 m freestyle	N/A		1:28.6	3 q	1:33.4	4	did not advance	
Louise Otto	100 m freestyle	N/A		1:34.4	2 Q	1:32.0	6	did not advance	
Grete Rosenberg	100 m freestyle	N/A		1:25.0	1 Q	1:29.2	3 q	1:27.2	4
Hermine Stindt	100 m freestyle	N/A		1:29.2	3	did not advance			
Wally Dressel; Louise Otto; Grete Rosenberg; Hermine Stindt	4 × 100 m free relay	N/A						6:04.6	2nd place, silver medalist(s)

== Athletics ==
24 athletes represented Germany. It was the fifth appearance of the nation in athletics, which Germany had appeared each time the Olympics had been held. The nation finished with two medals, both silver. Hanns Braun finished with the silver in the 400 metres and Hans Liesche won the silver medal in the high jump; these silvers were Germany's best results in the 1912 athletics competition and tied Germany's best results in athletics in Olympic history to that point.

The 4 × 100 metre relay team tied for the best time in the preliminary heats, matching the Olympic record set earlier in that round by the Swedish team. It then had the fastest time in the semifinals, taking sole possession of the Olympic record. This new record stood even after the finals as none of the finalist teams ran a better time; Germany committed a fault passing the baton and was disqualified in the final.

Ranks given are within that athlete's heat for running events.

Athlete	Events	Heat		Semifinal		Final	
Athlete	Events	Result	Rank	Result	Rank	Result	Rank
Alexander Abraham	Decathlon	N/A				2323.200	23
Georg Amberger	1500 m	N/A		4:27.0	3	did not advance	
Otto Bäurle	Triple jump	N/A		13.52	14	did not advance	
Otto Bäurle	Pentathlon	N/A				Elim-3 38	13
Hermann von Bönninghausen	110 m hurdles	17.0	2	16.0	3	did not advance	
Hanns Braun	400 m	50.6	1	49.2	1	48.3	2nd place, silver medalist(s)
Hanns Braun	800 m	?	2	1:54.6	2	1:53.0	6
Heinrich Burkowitz	400 m	51.7	3	did not advance			
Karl Halt	Shot put	N/A		41.99	22	did not advance	
Karl Halt	Javelin throw	N/A		43.71	19	did not advance	
Karl Halt	Pentathlon	N/A				did not finish	
Karl Halt	Decathlon	N/A				6682.445	9
Max Herrmann	100 m	?	3	did not advance			
Max Herrmann	200 m	22.9	1	?	4	did not advance	
Max Herrmann	400 m	?	3	did not advance			
Willie Jahn	800 m	2:02.4	4	did not advance			
Erwin Kern	100 m	?	2	?	5	did not advance	
Emil Ketterer	100 m	did not finish		did not advance			
Erich Lehmann	400 m	?	4	did not advance			
Erich Lehmann	800 m	?	3	did not advance			
Hans Liesche	High jump	N/A		1.83	1	1.91	2nd place, silver medalist(s)
Georg Mickler	1500 m	N/A		?	5	did not advance	
Robert Pasemann	Long jump	N/A		6.82	9	did not advance	
Robert Pasemann	Pole vault	N/A		3.40	11	did not advance	
Jacques Person	400 m	55.4	1	did not finish		did not advance	
Jacques Person	800 m	?	4	did not advance			
Richard Rau	100 m	11.5	1	10.9	2	did not advance	
Richard Rau	200 m	22.5	1	22.1	1	22.2	4
Otto Röhr	High jump	N/A		1.75	13	did not advance	
Otto Röhr	Decathlon	N/A				2844.750	20
Erwin von Sigel	1500 m	N/A		4:09.3	1	?	9-14
Gregor Vietz	5000 m	N/A		did not finish		did not advance	
Gregor Vietz	10000 m	N/A		did not finish		did not advance	
Gregor Vietz	Ind. cross country	N/A				54:40.6	27
Josef Waitzer	Discus throw	N/A		38.44	16	did not advance	
Josef Waitzer	Javelin throw	N/A		43.71	19	did not advance	
Josef Waitzer	Pentathlon	N/A				did not finish	
Emil Welz	Discus throw	N/A		37.24	24	did not advance	
Heinrich Wenseler	200 m	?	4	did not advance			
Heinrich Wenseler	400 m	?	3	did not advance			
Paul Willführ	Shot put	N/A		10.90	18	did not advance	
Paul Willführ	Discus throw	N/A		No mark	41	did not advance	
Paul Willführ	Javelin throw	N/A		41.05	23	did not advance	
Georg Amberger; Alfred Mickler; Erwin von Sigel; Gregor Vietz	3000 m team	N/A		12	2	did not advance	
Hanns Braun; Heinrich Burkowitz; Max Herrmann; Erich Lehmann	4 × 400 m	N/A		3:28.5	2	did not advance	
Karl Halt; Max Herrmann; Erwin Kern; Richard Rau	4 × 100 m	43.6 =OR	1	42.3 OR	1	Disqualified	

== Cycling ==
Eleven cyclists represented Germany. It was the fourth appearance of the nation in cycling, which had only not competed in cycling in 1904. Franz Lemnitz had the best time in the time trial, the only race held, placing 26th. The top four German cyclists had a combined time that placed them 6th of the 15 teams.

=== Road cycling ===
Cyclist	Events	Final	
Cyclist	Events	Result	Rank
Rudolf Baier	Ind. time trial	11:35:01.5	27
Robert Birker	Ind. time trial	12:19:27.6	62
Martin Koch	Ind. time trial	12:18:22.5	61
Franz Lemnitz	Ind. time trial	11:34:32.2	26
Carl Lüthje	Ind. time trial	13:00:31.8	79
Otto Männel	Ind. time trial	11:53:27.4	44
Wilhelm Rabe	Ind. time trial	12:06:55.8	55
Oswald Rathmann	Ind. time trial	11:40:18.4	33
Joseph Rieder	Ind. time trial	12:12:32.4	57
Hermann Smiel	Ind. time trial	12:49:01.6	76
Georg Warsow	Ind. time trial	11:45:24.0	36
Rudolf Baier; Franz Lemnitz; Oswald Rathmann; Georg Warsow	Team time trial	46:35:16.1	6

== Diving ==
Four divers, all men, represented Germany. It was Germany's third appearance in diving, with two of the top divers who had represented the nation in 1908 returning. The German men dominated the 3 metre springboard event with its second straight medal sweep in the event, taking the top four places in 1912. The team was less successful in the other two events, with only one of the four men advancing to the final in each. Zürner, the defending champion who finished fourth in the springboard, got a silver medal in the 10 metre platform event; this gave each of the four Germans a medal.

Rankings given are within the diver's heat.

Men

Diver	Events	Heats		Final	
Diver	Events	Result	Rank	Result	Rank
Kurt Behrens	3 m board	80.14	1 Q	73.73	3rd place, bronze medalist(s)
Kurt Behrens	10 m platform	58.35	8	did not advance	
Kurt Behrens	Plain high dive	35.1	7	did not advance	
Paul Günther	3 m board	78.14	2 Q	79.23	1st place, gold medalist(s)
Paul Günther	Plain high dive	36.1	1 Q	did not finish	
Hans Luber	3 m board	77.5	1 Q	76.78	2nd place, silver medalist(s)
Hans Luber	10 m platform	61.66	3	did not advance	
Hans Luber	Plain high dive	36.2	6	did not advance	
Albert Zürner	3 m board	74.64	2 Q	73.33	4
Albert Zürner	10 m platform	65.04	2 Q	72.6	2nd place, silver medalist(s)
Albert Zürner	Plain high dive	31.7	6	did not advance	

== Equestrian ==
Dressage

Rider	Horse	Event	Final	
Rider	Horse	Event	Penalties	Rank
Felix Bürkner	King	Individual	51	7
Andreas von Flotow	Senta	Individual	77	11
Carl von Moers	New Bank	Individual	83	12
Friedrich von Oesterley	Condor	Individual	36	4

Eventing

(The maximum score in each of the five events was 10.00 points. Ranks given are for the cumulative score after each event. Team score is the sum of the top three individual scores.)

Rider	Horse	Event	Long distance		Cross country		Steeplechase		Show jumping		Dressage		Total	
Rider	Horse	Event	Score	Rank	Score	Rank	Score	Rank	Score	Rank	Score	Rank	Score	Rank
Eduard von Lütcken	Blue Boy	Individual	10.00	1	10.00	1	10.00	1	9.27	6	6.63	8	45.90	8
Carl von Moers	May-Queen	Individual	10.00	1	10.00	1	8.20	18	8.67	16	7.56	15	44.43	15
Friedrich von Rochow	Idealist	Individual	10.00	1	10.00	1	10.00	1	9.53	1	6.89	2	46.42	2nd place, silver medalist(s)
Richard Graf von Schaesberg-Tannheim	Grundsee	Individual	10.00	1	10.00	1	10.00	1	9.40	3	6.76	5	46.16	5
Eduard von Lütcken; Friedrich von Rochow; Richard von Schaesberg; Carl von Moers	Blue Boy; Idealist; Grundsee; May-Queen	Team	30.00		30.00		30.00		28.20		20.28		138.48	2nd place, silver medalist(s)

Jumping

(Team score is the sum of the top three individual scores.)

Rider	Horse	Event	Final	
Rider	Horse	Event	Penalties	Rank
Ernst Deloch	Hubertus	Individual	10	9
Prince Friedrich Karl of Prussia	Gibson Boy	Individual	16	18
Sigismund Freyer	Ultimus	Individual	7	5
Friedrich von Grote	Polyphem	Individual	16	18
Wilhelm Graf von Hohenau	Pretty Girl	Individual	9	6
Rabod von Kröcher	Dohna	Individual	4	2nd place, silver medalist(s)
Ernst Deloch; Sigismund Freyer; Wilhelm von Hohenau; Prince Friedrich Karl of Prussia	Hubertus; Ultimus; Pretty Girl; Gibson Boy	Team	40	3rd place, bronze medalist(s)

== Fencing ==
Fifteen fencers represented Germany. It was the fourth appearance of the nation in fencing, in which Germany had not competed only in 1896. None of the Germans were able to advance to the finals of any event.

Fencer	Event	Round 1		Quarterfinal		Semifinal		Final	
Fencer	Event	Record	Rank	Record	Rank	Record	Rank	Record	Rank
Johannes Adam	Foil	3 losses	4	did not advance					
Adolf Davids	Foil	2 losses	3 Q	3 losses	4	did not advance			
Julius Lichtenfels	Foil	1 loss	1 Q	1 loss	3 Q	3 losses	4	did not advance	
Julius Lichtenfels	Épée	4 losses	5	did not advance					
Julius Lichtenfels	Sabre	3 wins	1 Q	1 loss	2 Q	did not start		did not advance	
Wilhelm Löffler	Foil	2 losses	3 Q	3 losses	4	did not advance			
Walther Meienreis	Épée	4 losses	5	did not advance					
Albert Naumann	Foil	4 losses	5	did not advance					
Hermann Plaskuda	Foil	2 losses	3 Q	4 losses	6	did not advance			
Hermann Plaskuda	Épée	3 losses	4	did not advance					
Emil Schön	Foil	1 loss	1 Q	3 losses	3 Q	2 losses	3	did not advance	
Emil Schön	Épée	2 losses	2 Q	4 losses	6	did not advance			
Heinrich Schrader	Épée	5 losses	6	did not advance					
Friedrich Schwarz	Épée	3 losses	4	did not advance					
Friedrich Schwarz	Sabre	2 wins	2 Q	1 loss	2 Q	0 wins	5	did not advance	
Georg Stöhr	Sabre	Bye		4 losses	5	did not advance			
Hans Thomson	Épée	2 losses	1 Q	4 losses	4	did not advance			
Hans Thomson	Sabre	2 wins	2 Q	2 losses	4	did not advance			
Julius Thomson	Foil	6 losses	7	did not advance					
Heinrich Ziegler	Foil	2 losses	4	did not advance					
Hermann Plaskuda; Emil Schön; Friedrich Schwarz; Heinrich Ziegler	Team épée	N/A		Bye		0–3	4	did not advance	
Johannes Adam; Jakob Erckrath de Bary; Julius Lichtenfels; Walther Meienreis; Hermann Plaskuda; Emil Schön; Friedrich Schwarz; Georg Stöhr	Team sabre	N/A		0–0	2 Q	0–3	4	did not advance	

== Football ==
Round of 16

1912-06-29

Austria	5 – 1	Germany
Merz 75' 81'; Studnicka 58'; Neubauer 62'; Cimera 89'		Jäger 35'

Råsunda Stadium, Stockholm
Attendance: 2,000

Consolation quarterfinals

1912-07-01

Germany	16 – 0	Russia
Fuchs 2' 9' 21' 28' 34' 46' 51' 55' 65' 69'; Förderer 6' 27' 53' 66'; Burger 30'; Oberle 58'

Råsunda Stadium, Stockholm
Attendance: 2,000

Consolation semifinals

1912-07-03

Hungary	3 – 1	Germany
Schlosser 3' 39' 82'		Förderer 56'

Råsunda Stadium, Stockholm
Attendance: 2,000

Final rank
7th place

== Gymnastics ==
Leipzig University had organised a trip to the Olympics for some of its sports students so that they could undertake academic studies of the various sports disciplines. The organising body for German gymnasts, Deutsche Turnerschaft, failed to organise the participation of an Olympic team. Leipzig University then applied for and was granted permission to provide a team of its students, led by the academic gymnastics teacher Hermann Kuhr. (Note: The sources do not state whether the first-mentioned Leipzig University team is the same that then competed)

Eighteen gymnasts represented Germany. It was the fifth appearance of the nation in gymnastics, in which Germany had competed at every Olympic Games. The nation sent no individual gymnasts, but did have a team compete in two of the three team events. In neither event did the team win a medal.

=== Artistic ===
Gymnast	Events	Final	
Gymnast	Events	Result	Rank
Germany	Team	32.40	5
Germany	Team, free system	16.85	4

Roster

Wilhelm Brülle, Johannes Buder, Walter Engelmann, Arno Glockauer, Walter Jesinghaus, Karl Jordan, Rudolf Körner, Heinrich Pahner, Kurt Reichenbach, Johannes Reuschle, Carl Richter, Hans Roth, Adolf Seebaß, Eberhard Sorge, Alexander Sperling, Alfred Staats, Hans Werner, Martin Worm

== Modern pentathlon ==
Germany had one competitor in the first Olympic pentathlon competition. Pauen finished 28th of 32 competitors in the first phase, and did not start the second.

(The scoring system was point-for-place in each of the five events, with the smallest point total winning.)

Athlete	Shooting		Swimming		Fencing			Riding			Running		Total points	Rank
Athlete	Score	Points	Time	Points	Wins	Touches	Points	Penalties	Time	Points	Time	Points	Total points	Rank
Carl Pauen	102	28	did not start		Retired								did not finish	

== Rowing ==
Twenty six rowers represented Germany. It was the nation's third appearance in rowing. Germany's coxed fours boat won the gold medal. The two German eights boats met in the quarterfinals, with the winner of that race going on to win a bronze medal.

(Ranks given are within each crew's heat.)

Rower	Event	Heats		Quarterfinals		Semifinals		Final	
Rower	Event	Result	Rank	Result	Rank	Result	Rank	Result	Rank
Kurt Hoffmann	Single sculls	Unknown	2	did not advance					
Martin Stahnke	Single sculls	8:28.8	1 Q	7:58.8	2	did not advance			
Albert Arnheiter; Otto Fickeisen; Rudolf Fickeisen; Karl Leister (cox); Otto Maier (cox); Hermann Wilker	Coxed four	7:06.6	1 Q	7:14.4	1 Q	7:41.0	1 Q	6:59.4	1st place, gold medalist(s)
Otto Charlet (cox); Fritz Eggebrecht; Carl Eichhorn; Richard Friesicke; Gottfried Gelfort; Heinrich Landrock; Egbert Reimsfeld; Andreas Wegener; Ludwig Weihnacht	Eight	6:45.1	1 Q	Unknown	2	did not advance			
Fritz Bartholomae; Willi Bartholomae; Max Bröske; Werner Dehn; Otto Liebing; Hans Matthiae; Rudolf Reichelt; Kurt Runge (cox); Max Vetter	Eight	6:57.0	1 Q	6:22.2	1 Q	6:18.6	2	did not advance ( (bronze) )	

== Shooting ==
Eleven shooters represented Germany. It was the nation's third appearance in shooting. Germany won its first Olympic shooting medals with a silver in the individual trap (by Alfred Goeldel) and a bronze in the team clay pigeons.

Shooter	Event	Final	
Shooter	Event	Result	Rank
Gerhard Bock	50 m pistol	395	44
Alfred Goeldel	Trap	94	2nd place, silver medalist(s)
Horst Goeldel	100 m deer, single shots	27	24
Horst Goeldel	Trap	86	12
Erich Graf von Bernstorff	Trap	84	17
Heinrich Hoffmann	50 m pistol	189	54
Erland Koch	100 m deer, single shots	33	13
Erland Koch	100 m deer, double shots	47	17
Erland Koch	Trap	86	12
Hans Lüttich	Trap	77	25
Georg Meyer	30 m rapid fire pistol	207	39
Albert Preuß	100 m deer, single shots	28	21
Albert Preuß	100 m deer, double shots	47	17
Albert Preuß	Trap	88	4
Franz von Zedlitz und Leipe	Trap	88	4
Gerhard Bock; Heinrich Hoffmann; Georg Meyer; Benno Wandollek	30 m team military pistol	890	7
Alfred Goeldel; Horst Goeldel; Erich Graf von Bernstorff; Erland Koch; Albert Preuß; Franz von Zedlitz und Leipe	Team clay pigeons	510	3rd place, bronze medalist(s)

== Tennis ==
Seven tennis players, including one woman, represented Germany at the 1912 Games. It was the nation's fourth appearance in tennis, having missed only 1900. The lone German woman, Köring, was the most successful German player, taking the silver medal in her outdoor singles competition and winning the gold along with Schomburgk in the outdoor mixed doubles. Kreuzer was the only one of the six men to advance to the semifinals in the men's singles; he finished with the bronze medal.

Men

Athlete	Event	Round of 128	Round of 64	Round of 32	Round of 16	Quarterfinals	Semifinals	Final	
Athlete	Event	Opposition Score	Opposition Score	Opposition Score	Opposition Score	Opposition Score	Opposition Score	Opposition Score	Rank
Ludwig Heyden	Outdoor singles	Bye	Mény (FRA); W 7-9, 4-6, 6-2, 7-5, 6-1	Kelemen (HUN); W 6-3, 4-6, 7-5, 7-5	Pell (USA); W 2-6, 7-5, 8-6, 7-5	Winslow (RSA); L 6-2, 6-4, 8-10, 4-6, 6-3	did not advance		5
Oscar Kreuzer	Outdoor singles	Bye	Björklund (NOR); W 6-0, 6-0, 6-1	Bye	Sumarokow (RUS); W 6-2, 10-12, 6-4, 6-0	Zborzil (AUT); W 6-4, 6-3, 6-2	Winslow (RSA); L 9-7, 7-5, 6-2	Žemla (BOH); W 6-2, 3-6, 6-3, 6-1	3rd place, bronze medalist(s)
Otto Lindpainter	Outdoor singles	Pipes (AUT); L 6-2, 6-3, 6-3	did not advance						48
Heinrich Schomburgk	Outdoor singles	Bye	Bye	Spiess (GER); W 8-6, 6-1, 6-4	Kitson (RSA); L 6-2, 6-2, 6-3	did not advance			9
Robert Spiess	Outdoor singles	Bye	Just (BOH); W 2-6, 6-3, 3-6, 6-3, 6-1	Schomburgk (GER); L 8-6, 6-1, 6-4	did not advance				17
Otto von Müller	Outdoor singles	Bye	Fredriksen (DEN); W 6-2, 6-1, 6-4	Zsigmondy (HUN); W 6-1, 6-2, 6-0	Kehrling (HUN); W 6-2, 6-1, 6-1	Žemla (BOH); L 6-4, 7-5, 6-4	did not advance		5
Ludwig Heyden; Robert Spiess	Outdoor doubles	N/A		Grönfors & Möller (SWE); W 3-6, 6-4, 6-2, 4-6, 6-1	Frederiksen & Frigast (DEN); W 6-2, 7-5, 6-3	Just & Žemla (BOH); L 6-0, 8-6, 6-4	did not advance		5
Heinrich Schomburgk; Otto von Müller	Outdoor doubles	N/A		Bárath & Kelemen (HUN); W 6-0, 6-0, 6-2	Canet & Mény (FRA); L 6-8, 6-3, 6-2, 6-3	did not advance			9

Women

Athlete	Event	Round of 16	Quarterfinals	Semifinals	Final	
Athlete	Event	Opposition Score	Opposition Score	Opposition Score	Opposition Score	Rank
Dora Köring	Outdoor singles	Fick (SWE); W 7-5, 6-3	Bye	Arnheim (SWE); W 6-4, 6-3	Broquedis (FRA); L 4-6, 6-3, 6-4	2nd place, silver medalist(s)

Mixed

Athlete	Event	Round of 16	Quarterfinals	Semifinals	Final	
Athlete	Event	Opposition Score	Opposition Score	Opposition Score	Opposition Score	Rank
Dora Köring; Heinrich Schomburgk	Outdoor doubles	Bye	Bye	Broquedis & Canet (FRA); W 6-2, 6-3	Fick & Setterwall (SWE); W 6-4, 6-0	1st place, gold medalist(s)

== Wrestling ==
=== Greco-Roman ===
Germany sent 14 wrestlers in its third Olympic wrestling appearance. Gerstäcker had the best performance from among the Germans, taking the nation's first medal since 1896 when he placed second in the featherweight class. Two other Germans advanced to within one bout of the medal rounds. The German team went a combined 23-27 in the elimination rounds and 1-1 in the medals rounds.

Wrestler	Class	First round	Second round	Third round	Fourth round	Fifth round	Sixth round	Seventh round	Final			
Wrestler	Class	Opposition Result	Opposition Result	Opposition Result	Opposition Result	Opposition Result	Opposition Result	Opposition Result	Match A Opposition Result	Match B Opposition Result	Match C Opposition Result	Rank
Georg Andersen	Featherweight	Johansson (SWE); L	Pongrácz (HUN); L	did not advance								26
Andreas Dumrauf	Lightweight	Mathiasson (SWE); L	Lofthus (NOR); L	did not advance								31
Georg Gerstäcker	Featherweight	Szoszky (HUN); W	Mustonen (FIN); W	Johansson (SWE); W	Haapanen (FIN); W	Kangas (FIN); L	Lehmusvirta (FIN); W	Leivonen (FIN); W	Lasanen (FIN); W	Bye	Koskelo (FIN); L	2nd place, silver medalist(s)
Karl Gross	Light heavyweight	Rajala (FIN); L	Böhling (FIN); L	did not advance				N/A	did not advance			20
Jean Hauptmanns	Heavyweight	Viljaama (FIN); L	Saarela (FIN); L	did not advance				N/A	did not advance			12
Bruno Heckel	Lightweight	Lund (SWE); L	Björklund (SWE); W	Pukkila (FIN); W	Tanttu (FIN); W	Kolehmainen (FIN); L	did not advance					11
Adolf Kurz	Middleweight	Andersen (DEN); W	Åberg (FIN); L	Holm (FIN); L	did not advance							20
Fritz Lange	Light heavyweight	Lindberg (FIN); L	Trestler (AUT); W	Andersson (SWE); W	Wiklund (FIN); W	Bye	Böhling (FIN); L	N/A	did not advance			4
Joseph Merkle	Middleweight	Holm (FIN); W	Fältström (SWE); W	Åberg (FIN); L	Klein (RUS); L	did not advance						11
Jakob Neser	Heavyweight	Farnest (RUS); W	Bonneveld (NED); W	Olin (FIN); L	Lindfors (FIN); W	Viljaama (FIN); W	Saarela (FIN); L	N/A	did not advance			4
Peter Oehler	Light heavyweight	Nagel (DEN); W	Kumpu (FIN); W	Böhling (FIN); L	Eriksen (DEN); L	did not advance		N/A	did not advance			11
Ludwig Saeurhöfer	Lightweight	Nilsson (SWE); L	Jonsson (SWE); W	Sándor (HUN); W	Lofthus (NOR); L	did not advance						17
Konrad Stein	Featherweight	Larsson (SWE); L	Ankondinow (RUS); L	did not advance								26
Wilhelm Steputat	Middleweight	Åberg (FIN); L	Bye	Gargano (ITA); L	did not advance							20
