= Wrestling at the 1912 Summer Olympics – Men's Greco-Roman lightweight =

Men's lightweight Greco-Roman wrestling at the Games of the V Olympiad
- Venue: Stockholm Olympic Stadium
- Dates: July 6–15
- Competitors: 48 from 13 nations

Medalists
1st place, gold medalist(s)		Emil Väre	Finland
2nd place, silver medalist(s)		Gustaf Malmström	Sweden
3rd place, bronze medalist(s)		Edvin Mattiasson	Sweden

The Greco-Roman lightweight competition at the 1912 Summer Olympics was part of the wrestling programme.

The competition used a form of double-elimination tournament. Rather than using the brackets that are now standard for double-elimination contests (and which assure that each match is between two competitors with the same number of losses), each wrestler drew a number. Each man would face off against the wrestler with the next number, provided he had not already faced that wrestler and that the wrestler was not from the same nation as him (unless this was necessary to avoid byes).

When only three wrestlers remain (the medalists), the double-elimination halts and a special final round is used to determine the order of the medals.

Lightweight was the second-lightest category, including wrestlers weighing 60 to 67.5 kilograms (132.3 to 148.8 lb).

== Results ==
=== First round ===
48 wrestlers began the competition.

Losses	Winner	Loser	Losses
0	József Sándor (HUN)	Karl Johnson (SWE)	1
0	Johan Nilsson (SWE)	Ludwig Sauerhöfer (GER)	1
0	Herbrand Lofthus (NOR)	Raymond Cabal (FRA)	1
0	Edvin Mathiasson (SWE)	Andreas Dumrauf (GER)	1
0	Volmar Wikström (FIN)	Eugène Lesieur (FRA)	1
0	Dezső Orosz (HUN)	Richard Rydström (SWE)	1
0	Paul Tirkkonen (FIN)	Josef Stejskal (AUT)	1
0	Gustaf Malmström (SWE)	Johan Urvikko (FIN)	1
0	Ernő Márkus (HUN)	Arthur Gould (GBR)	1
0	Frederik Hansen (DEN)	Árpád Szántó (HUN)	1
0	Viktor Fischer (AUT)	Thorbjørn Frydenlund (NOR)	1
0	Armas Laitinen (FIN)	Gottfrid Svenson (SWE)	1
0	Bror Flygare (SWE)	Karel Halík (BOH)	1
0	Ödön Radvány (HUN)	August Kippasto (RU1)	1
0	Jan Balej (BOH)	William Ruff (GBR)	1
0	Richard Frydenlund (NOR)	William Lupton (GBR)	1
0	Johan Salonen (FIN)	Jean Bouffechoux (FRA)	1
0	Eemili Väre (FIN)	Georg Baumann (RU1)	1
0	Oskar Kaplur (RU1)	William Hayes (GBR)	1
0	Alessandro Covre (ITA)	Tuomas Pukkila (FIN)	1
0	David Kolehmainen (FIN)	Thorvald Olsen (NOR)	1
0	Aatami Tanttu (FIN)	Johannes Eillebrecht (NED)	1
0	Hugo Björklund (SWE)	Robert Phelps (GBR)	1
0	Carl Lund (SWE)	Bruno Heckel (GER)	1

=== Second round ===
Arthur Gould and Árpád Szántó withdrew after their first round losses. 46 wrestlers started the second round, 24 with no losses and 22 with one.

16 were eliminated. 6 survived potential elimination (5 by eliminating another wrestler, 1 by giving a previously undefeated wrestler his first loss). 7 received their first loss, while 17 remained undefeated.

Losses	Winner	Loser	Losses
0	Johan Nilsson (SWE)	József Sándor (HUN)	1
1	Ludwig Saeurhöfer (GER)	Martin Jonsson (SWE)	2
0	Edvin Mathiasson (SWE)	Raymond Cabal (FRA)	2
0	Herbrand Lofthus (NOR)	Andreas Dumrauf (GER)	2
0	Dezső Orosz (HUN)	Eugène Lesieur (FRA)	2
0	Volmar Wikström (FIN)	Richard Rydström (SWE)	2
1	Johan Urvikko (FIN)	Josef Stejskal (AUT)	2
0	Gustaf Malmström (SWE)	Paul Tirkkonen (FIN)	1
0	Frederik Hansen (DEN)	Ernő Márkus (HUN)	1
0	Otto Laitinen (FIN)	Viktor Fischer (AUT)	1
1	Gottfrid Svenson (SWE)	Thorbjørn Frydenlund (NOR)	2
1	Karel Halík (BOH)	August Kippasto (RU1)	2
0	Ödön Radvány (HUN)	Bror Flygare (SWE)	1
0	Jan Balej (BOH)	William Lupton (GBR)	2
0	Richard Frydenlund (NOR)	William Ruff (GBR)	2
0	Johan Salonen (FIN)	Georg Baumann (RU1)	2
0	Eemili Väre (FIN)	Jean Bouffechoux (FRA)	2
0	Oskar Kaplur (RU1)	Alessandro Covre (ITA)	1
1	Tuomas Pukkila (FIN)	William Hayes (GBR)	2
0	Aatami Tanttu (FIN)	Thorvald Olsen (NOR)	2
0	David Kolehmainen (FIN)	Johannes Eillenbrecht (NED)	2
0	Carl Lund (SWE)	Robert Phelps (GBR)	2
1	Bruno Heckel (GER)	Hugo Björklund (SWE)	1

=== Third round ===
Paul Tirkkonen and Bror Flygare abandoned the contest after their first losses in round 2. 28 wrestlers started the third round, 17 with no losses and 11 with one.

6 were eliminated. 5 survived potential elimination (2 by eliminating another wrestler, 3 by giving a previously undefeated wrestler his first loss). 8 received their first loss, while 9 remained undefeated.

Losses	Winner	Loser	Losses
1	Ludwig Saeurhöfer (GER)	József Sándor (HUN)	2
0	Johan Nilsson (SWE)	Herbrand Lofthus (NOR)	1
0	Volmar Wikström (FIN)	Edvin Mathiasson (SWE)	1
1	Johan Urvikko (FIN)	Dezső Orosz (HUN)	1
0	Gustaf Malmström (SWE)	Ernő Márkus (HUN)	2
1	Viktor Fischer (AUT)	Frederik Hansen (DEN)	1
0	Otto Laitinen (FIN)	Karel Halík (BOH)	2
1	Gottfrid Svenson (SWE)	Ödön Radvány (HUN)	1
0	Jan Balej (BOH)	Richard Frydenlund (NOR)	1
0	Oskar Kaplur (RU1)	Johan Salonen (FIN)	1
0	Eemili Väre (FIN)	Alessandro Covre (ITA)	2
1	Bruno Heckel (GER)	Tuomas Pukkila (FIN)	2
0	David Kolehmainen (FIN)	Hugo Björklund (SWE)	2
0	Aatami Tanttu (FIN)	Carl Lund (SWE)	1

=== Fourth round ===
22 wrestlers started the fourth round, 9 with no losses and 13 with one.

6 were eliminated. 7 survived potential elimination (4 by eliminating another wrestler, 3 by giving a previously undefeated wrestler his first loss). 5 received their first loss, while 4 remained undefeated.

Losses	Winner	Loser	Losses
0	Volmar Wikström (FIN)	Johan Nilsson (SWE)	1
1	Herbrand Lofthus (NOR)	Ludwig Saeurhöfer (GER)	2
1	Edvin Mathiasson (SWE)	Dezső Orosz (HUN)	2
1	Frederik Hansen (DEN)	Johan Urvikko (FIN)	2
0	Gustaf Malmström (SWE)	Viktor Fischer (AUT)	2
1	Ödön Radvány (HUN)	Otto Laitinen (FIN)	1
0	Jan Balej (BOH)	Gottfrid Svenson (SWE)	2
1	Johan Salonen (FIN)	Richard Frydenlund (NOR)	2
0	Eemili Väre (FIN)	Oskar Kaplur (RU1)	1
1	Carl Lund (SWE)	David Kolehmainen (FIN)	1
1	Bruno Heckel (GER)	Aatami Tanttu (FIN)	1

=== Fifth round ===
Otto Laitinen withdrew after his first loss, in round four.

15 wrestlers started the fifth round, 4 with no losses and 11 with one. The round exhibited a set-up slightly peculiar for the format, in that every match was symmetrical in terms of number of losses for each wrestler. 2 matches were between pairs of undefeated men, while 5 matches were between pairs of wrestlers both facing elimination. There were no matches between an undefeated wrestler and one with one loss.

Unsurprisingly, given that, 5 men were eliminated and 5 survived potential elimination, with a sixth advancing with one loss due to a bye. 2 received their first loss, while 2 remained undefeated.

Losses	Winner	Loser	Losses
1	Johan Nilsson (SWE)	Johan Salonen (FIN)	2
1	Edvin Mathiasson (SWE)	Herbrand Lofthus (NOR)	2
0	Gustaf Malmström (SWE)	Volmar Wikström (FIN)	1
1	Ödön Radvány (HUN)	Frederik Hansen (DEN)	2
0	Eemili Väre (FIN)	Jan Balej (BOH)	1
1	Oskar Kaplur (RU1)	Aatami Tanttu (FIN)	2
1	David Kolehmainen (FIN)	Bruno Heckel (GER)	2
1	Carl Lund (SWE)	Bye	—

=== Sixth round ===
10 wrestlers started the fifth round, 2 with no losses and 8 with one.

The two remaining undefeated wrestlers, Väre and Malmström, faced off, with Väre coming out the better. The other four matches were all between two men facing elimination, and so the winners of those four matches were expected to join Malmström in moving to the seventh round with one loss while the losers were out. The match between Kaplur and Kolehmainen, however, resulted in both wrestlers being disqualified, so only 5 wrestlers moved on.

Losses	Winner	Loser	Losses
1	Carl Lund (SWE)	Volmar Wikström (FIN)	2
1	Ödön Radvány (HUN)	Johan Nilsson (SWE)	2
1	Edvin Mathiasson (SWE)	Jan Balej (BOH)	2
0	Eemili Väre (FIN)	Gustaf Malmström (SWE)	1
2	Oskar Kaplur (RU1)	David Kolehmainen (FIN)	2

=== Seventh round ===
5 wrestlers started the fifth round, 1 with no losses and 4 with one. The match between Lund and Radvány resulted in both wrestlers disqualified, pulling the round to a quick halt since there were then remaining only three wrestlers. Those three moved on to the final round.

Losses	Winner	Loser	Losses
2	Carl Lund (SWE)	Ödön Radvány (HUN)	2
1	Edvin Mathiasson (SWE)	Bye	—
0	Eemili Väre (FIN)	Bye	—
1	Gustaf Malmström (SWE)	Bye	—

=== Final round ===
With three wrestlers remaining, all of the previous results were ignored for the final round.

Match		Winner	Loser	
A	To C	Eemili Väre (FIN)	Edvin Mathiasson (SWE)	To B
B	To C	Gustaf Malmström (SWE)	Edvin Mathiasson (SWE)	Bronze
C	Gold	Eemili Väre (FIN)	Gustaf Malmström (SWE)	Silver
