= Wrestling at the 1912 Summer Olympics – Men's Greco-Roman heavyweight =

Men's heavyweight Greco-Roman wrestling at the Games of the V Olympiad
- Venue: Stockholm Olympic Stadium
- Dates: July 7–14
- Competitors: 17 from 9 nations

Medalists
1st place, gold medalist(s)		Yrjö Saarela	Finland
2nd place, silver medalist(s)		Johan Olin	Finland
3rd place, bronze medalist(s)		Søren Marinus Jensen	Denmark

The Greco-Roman heavyweight competition at the 1912 Summer Olympics was part of the wrestling programme.

The competition used a form of double-elimination tournament. Rather than using the brackets that are now standard for double-elimination contests (and which assure that each match is between two competitors with the same number of losses), each wrestler drew a number. Each man would face off against the wrestler with the next number, provided he had not already faced that wrestler and that the wrestler was not from the same nation as him (unless this was necessary to avoid byes).

When only three wrestlers remain (the medalists), the double-elimination halts and a special final round is used to determine the order of the medals.

Heavyweight was the heaviest category, including wrestlers weighing over 82.5 kilograms (181.9 lb).

== Results ==
=== First round ===
17 wrestlers began the competition.

Losses	Winner	Loser	Losses
0	Yrjö Saarela (FIN)	David Karlsson (SWE)	1
0	Kalle Viljamaa (FIN)	Jean Hauptmanns (GER)	1
0	Johan Olin (FIN)	Raoul Paoli (FRA)	1
0	Gustaf Lindstrand (SWE)	Laurent Gerstmans (BEL)	1
0	Barend Bonneveld (NED)	Emil Backenius (FIN)	1
0	Jakob Neser (GER)	Nikolajs Fārnasts (RUS)	1
0	Søren Jensen (DEN)	Edward Barrett (GBR)	1
0	Adolf Lindfors (FIN)	Alrik Sandberg (SWE)	1
0	Gustaf Pelander (FIN)	Bye	—

=== Second round ===
17 wrestlers started the second round, 9 with no losses and 8 with one. Pelander, who had had a bye in the first round, wrestled twice in the second.

6 wrestlers were eliminated, the most possible given that 3 of the 9 matches were between two undefeated wrestlers. 2 survived potential elimination by eliminating another wrestler. 3 received their first loss, while 6 remained undefeated.

Losses	Winner	Loser	Losses
0	Gustaf Pelander (FIN)	David Karlsson (SWE)	2
0	Yrjö Saarela (FIN)	Jean Hauptmanns (GER)	2
0	Kalle Viljaama (FIN)	Raoul Paoli (FRA)	2
0	Johan Olin (FIN)	Gustaf Lindstrand (SWE)	1
1	Emil Backenius (FIN)	Laurent Gerstmans (BEL)	2
0	Jakob Neser (GER)	Barend Bonneveld (NED)	1
1	Edward Barrett (GBR)	Nikolajs Farnest (RUS)	2
0	Søren Jensen (DEN)	Adolf Lindfors (FIN)	1
0	Gustaf Pelander (FIN)	Alrik Sandberg (SWE)	2

=== Third round ===
11 wrestlers started the third round, 6 with no losses and 5 with one.

3 wrestlers were eliminated, the most possible given that 2 of the 5 matches were between two undefeated wrestlers. 2 survived potential elimination, 1 by eliminating another wrestler and 1 via a bye. 2 received their first loss, while 4 remained undefeated.

Losses	Winner	Loser	Losses
0	Yrjö Saarela (FIN)	Gustaf Lindstrand (SWE)	2
0	Kalle Viljaama (FIN)	Barend Bonneveld (NED)	2
0	Johan Olin (FIN)	Jakob Neser (GER)	1
1	Emil Backenius (FIN)	Edward Barrett (GBR)	2
0	Søren Jensen (DEN)	Gustaf Pelander (FIN)	1
1	Adolf Lindfors (FIN)	Bye	—

=== Fourth round ===
8 wrestlers started the fourth round, 4 with no losses and 4 with one.

The matches in this round were all symmetrical in terms of number of losses by the wrestlers involved. Two involved a pair of wrestlers with one loss each, with the other two being contested by the four undefeated wrestlers. This led to two men being eliminated, two surviving potential elimination, two receiving their first loss, and two remaining undefeated.

Losses	Winner	Loser	Losses
1	Jakob Neser (GER)	Adolf Lindfors (FIN)	2
0	Yrjö Saarela (FIN)	Søren Jensen (DEN)	1
0	Kalle Viljaama (FIN)	Johan Olin (FIN)	1
1	Emil Backenius (FIN)	Gustaf Pelander (FIN)	2

=== Fifth round ===
6 wrestlers started the fifth round, 2 with no losses and 4 with one.

In what could have been the last elimination round, the two undefeated wrestlers each faced off against a man with one loss. Olin's survival of his potential elimination by defeating Saarela was the first instance of a man with one loss defeating an undefeated wrestler in the event; it was followed closely by Neser's defeat of Viljaama. Each of those four men advanced to the sixth round along with Jensen, who had won the only certain loser-out match of the round against Backenius.

Losses	Winner	Loser	Losses
1	Johan Olin (FIN)	Yrjö Saarela (FIN)	1
1	Jakob Neser (GER)	Kalle Viljaama (FIN)	1
1	Søren Jensen (DEN)	Emil Backenius (FIN)	2

=== Sixth round ===
5 wrestlers started the fourth round, all with one loss.

With only five men left, and all having a loss, the sixth round would have consisted of two matches that were both sure to be loser-out. Viljaama, however, withdrew after having suffered his first loss. This left only one match in the sixth round, and Olin and Jensen had the byes. Neser faced Saarela; the German was unable to survive elimination a second time in a row and fell to the Finn.

Losses	Winner	Loser	Losses
1	Yrjö Saarela (FIN)	Jakob Neser (GER)	2
1	Johan Olin (FIN)	Bye	—
1	Søren Jensen (DEN)	Bye	—

=== Final round ===
With three wrestlers remaining, all of the previous results were ignored for the final round.

Match		Winner	Loser	
A	To C	Yrjö Saarela (FIN)	Søren Jensen (DEN)	To B
B	To C	Johan Olin (FIN)	Søren Jensen (DEN)	Bronze
C	Gold	Yrjö Saarela (FIN)	Johan Olin (FIN)	Silver
