= August Kippasto =

Estonian wrestler (1887–1973)

- Born: 28 August 1887; Tartu, Kreis Dorpat, Governorate of Livonia
- Died: 24 September 1973 (aged 86); Sydney, New South Wales, Australia

August Johannes Kippasto (28 August 1887 – 24 September 1973) was an Estonian wrestler who competed for the Russian Empire at the 1912 Summer Olympics in Stockholm.

He competed in the Greco-Roman lightweight competition along with two other Estonians, Georg Baumann and Oskar Kaplur, at the 1912 Summer Olympics in Stockholm, where he was eliminated after losing against Ödön Radvány and Karel Halík.

In 1929 he emigrated to Australia, where he worked as a piano tuner in Melbourne and while living in Mount Isa, and as a pupil of the great Georg Hackenschmidt, also tried his hand in professional wrestling under the name Russian Strongman Razgon (Ragozin, Ivan Razgon, Kippasto Razgon), but without success. He wrestled among others with Estonian-born Martin Bucht, former Pacific Coast Light Heavyweight Champion, Heavyweight Champion of Australia and Master of a Thousand Holds Billy Meeske. and the American heavyweight wrestler Bill Beth.

1973 he published poem collection "Mõtteid Kodust" in Sydney.
