= Frydenlund (surname) =

Frydenlund is a surname. Notable people with the surname include:

- Bård frydenlund (born 1972), Norwegian historian
- Knut Frydenlund (1927–1987), Norwegian diplomat and politician
- Olaf Frydenlund (1862–1947), Norwegian rifle shooter
- Richard Frydenlund (1891–1981), Norwegian wrestler
- Thorbjørn Frydenlund (1892–1989), Norwegian wrestler
