= Johan Nilsson =

Johan Nilsson may refer to:

- Johan Nilsson (wrestler), Swedish wrestler
- Johan Nilsson i Skottlandshus, Swedish politician

== See also ==
- Johan Nilsson Guiomar (born 1985), Swedish footballer
