= Balej =

Balej is a surname. Notable people with the surname include:

- Jan Balej (born 1958), Czech animation artist, film director, and art designer
- Jan Balej (wrestler) (born 1893), Czech wrestler
- Jozef Balej (born 1982), Slovak ice hockey right winger
