= Urvikko =

Urvikko is a surname. Notable people with the surname include:

- Annika Urvikko (born 1990), Finnish artistic gymnast
- Vihtori Urvikko (1889–1961), Finnish wrestler
