= Männel =

Männel is a surname. Notable people with the surname include:

- Martin Männel (born 1988), German footballer
- Otto Männel (1887–1964), German cyclist
- Wolfgang Männel (1937–2006), German professor
