= Carl Rosenblad =

Carl Rosenblad may refer to:

- Carl Rosenblad (equestrian) (1886–1953), Swedish Olympic horse rider
- Carl Rosenblad (racing driver) (born 1969), Swedish auto racing driver
