= Georg Baumann =

Estonian Greco-Roman wrestler

- Born: 1 September 1892; St. Petersburg, Russian Empire
- Died: before 19 February 1934; Shanghai, Republic of China
Medal record
Representing Russian Empire
Men's Greco-Roman wrestling
World Championships
Gold medal – first place	1913 Breslau	75 kg

Georg Baumann (1 September 1892 – before 19 February 1934) was an Estonian wrestler who competed for the Russian Empire, and was world champion in Greco-Roman wrestling.

== Biography ==
He competed in the Greco-Roman lightweight competition along with two other Estonians, August Kippasto and Oskar Kaplur, at the 1912 Summer Olympics in Stockholm, where he was eliminated after losing against later winner Emil Väre and Johan Alfred Salonen.

He was the lightweight class World champion at the 1913 Wrestling World Championships in Breslau. In the same year, he won a gold in the Russian Olympiad and was awarded the title of Best Amateur Wrestler of the Baltic States. Although some sources claim that he was killed during World War I there are reports of him moving to China in 1922 where he worked as wrestler and circus artist. His death was reported in the Russian language Chinese newspaper Shanghaiskaya Zarya on 19 February 1934.

== See also ==
- List of people who disappeared mysteriously: 1910–1990
