= Wrestling at the 1912 Summer Olympics =

Wrestling at the Games of the V Olympiad
- Venue: Stockholm Olympic Stadium
- Dates: 6–15 July 1912
- No. of events: 5 (5 men, 0 women)
- Competitors: 170 from 18 nations

At the 1912 Summer Olympics, five wrestling events were contested. They were all for men in the Greco-Roman style. The Light Heavyweight final ended after a nine-hour draw. It was subsequently decided that both competitors would receive a silver medal.

Wrestling

== Medal summary ==
=== Greco Roman ===
Games	Gold	Silver	Bronze
Featherweight	Kaarlo Koskelo; Finland	Georg Gerstäcker; Germany	Otto Lasanen; Finland
Lightweight	Emil Väre; Finland	Gustaf Malmström; Sweden	Edvin Mattiasson; Sweden
Middleweight	Claes Johanson; Sweden	Martin Klein; Russian Empire	Alfred Asikainen; Finland
Light Heavyweight	none awarded	Anders Ahlgren; Sweden	Béla Varga; Hungary
Light Heavyweight	none awarded	Ivar Böhling; Finland	Béla Varga; Hungary
Heavyweight	Yrjö Saarela; Finland	Johan Olin; Finland	Søren Marinus Jensen; Denmark

== Participating nations ==
A total of 170 wrestlers from 18 nations competed at the Stockholm Games:

- Austria (8)
- Belgium (1)
- Bohemia (4)
- Denmark (9)
- Finland (37)
- France (6)
- Germany (14)
- Great Britain (12)
- Greece (1)
- Hungary (10)
- Iceland (1)
- Italy (6)
- Netherlands (3)
- Norway (9)
- Portugal (2)
- Russian Empire (11)
- Sweden (34)
- United States (2)

== Medal table ==
Rank	Nation	Gold	Silver	Bronze	Total
1	Finland	3	2	2	7
2	Sweden	1	2	1	4
3	Germany	0	1	0	1
3	Russian Empire	0	1	0	1
5	Denmark	0	0	1	1
5	Hungary	0	0	1	1
Totals (6 entries)		4	6	5	15
