= József Sándor =

József Sándor may refer to:

- József Sándor (wrestler)
- József Sándor (politician)
