= Oscar af Ström =

Swedish equestrian

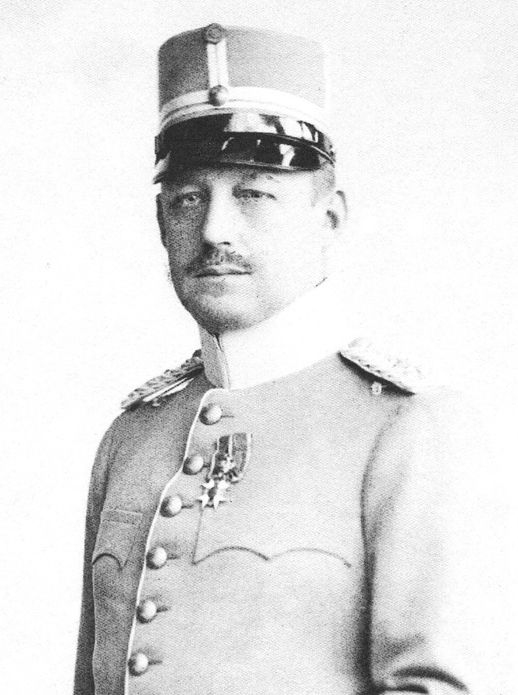

Personal information
- Born: 8 July 1867 Solna, Stockholm, Sweden
- Died: 13 March 1952 (aged 84) Stockholm, Sweden

Sport
- Sport: Horse riding
- Club: K2 IF, Stockholm

Oscar Adolf Richard af Ström (8 July 1867 – 13 March 1952) was a Swedish Army officer and horse rider. He competed in the 1912 Summer Olympics and finished sixth in the individual dressage event on the horse Irish Lass.

af Ström became major in the reserve in 1930.

== Awards and decorations ==
af Ström's awards:

- Knight of the Order of the Sword
- Knight of the Order of St John in Sweden
- Knight Fourth Class of the Military Merit Order with crown
- First Class of the Military Cross
- Knight Third Class of the Order of the Crown
- Knight of the Order of Leopold with war decoration
