= IF Ørnulf =

Norwegian sports club

- Full name: Idrettsforeningen Ørnulf
- Founded: 1893

Idrettsforeningen Ørnulf is a Norwegian sports club from Oslo. It has sections for amateur boxing and floorball.

== General history ==
The club was founded in 1893, and was a founding member of the Norwegian Wrestling Federation. It formerly had sections for track and field and amateur wrestling.

== Sporting success ==
Well-known boxers include Hjalmar Nygaard (1920 Olympian), Edgar Christensen (1924 Olympian), Arthur Olsen (1928 Olympian), Asbjørn Berg-Hansen (1936 Olympian), Simen Auseth (1984 Olympian) and Thomas Hansvoll (later professional).

Well-known wrestlers include Karl Norbeck, Kjell Steen-Nilsen and Thorvald Olsen (1912 Olympian), Alfred Gundersen (1912 Olympian), Ansgar Løvold (1912 Olympian), Thorbjørn Frydenlund (1912 Olympian), Richard Frydenlund (1912 and 1920 Olympian), Bjørn Cook (1948 Olympian), Egil Solsvik (1948 Olympian), Bjørn Larsson (1952 Olympian).

Well-known athletes include Per Oscar Andersen, Carl Albert Andersen (1900 Olympian in athletics), Oscar Guttormsen (1906 and 1908 Olympian), Carl Alfred Pedersen (1906 Olympian in athletics), Fritz Skullerud (1906 Olympian), Halfdan Bjølgerud (1906 Olympian), Rolf Stenersen (1920 Olympian), Helge Løvland (1920 Olympic champion), Hans Gundhus (1924 Olympian), John Johansen (1908 Olympian, but not for Ørnulf) and Bjarne Guldager (1920 Olympian, but not for Ørnulf).
