= Ernő Márkus =

Hungarian wrestler

- Born: 15 April 1890; Budapest, Hungary

Ernő Márkus (born 15 April 1890, date of death unknown) was a Hungarian wrestler. He competed in the lightweight event at the 1912 Summer Olympics.
