= Fritz Skullerud =

Norwegian long-distance runner (1885–1969)

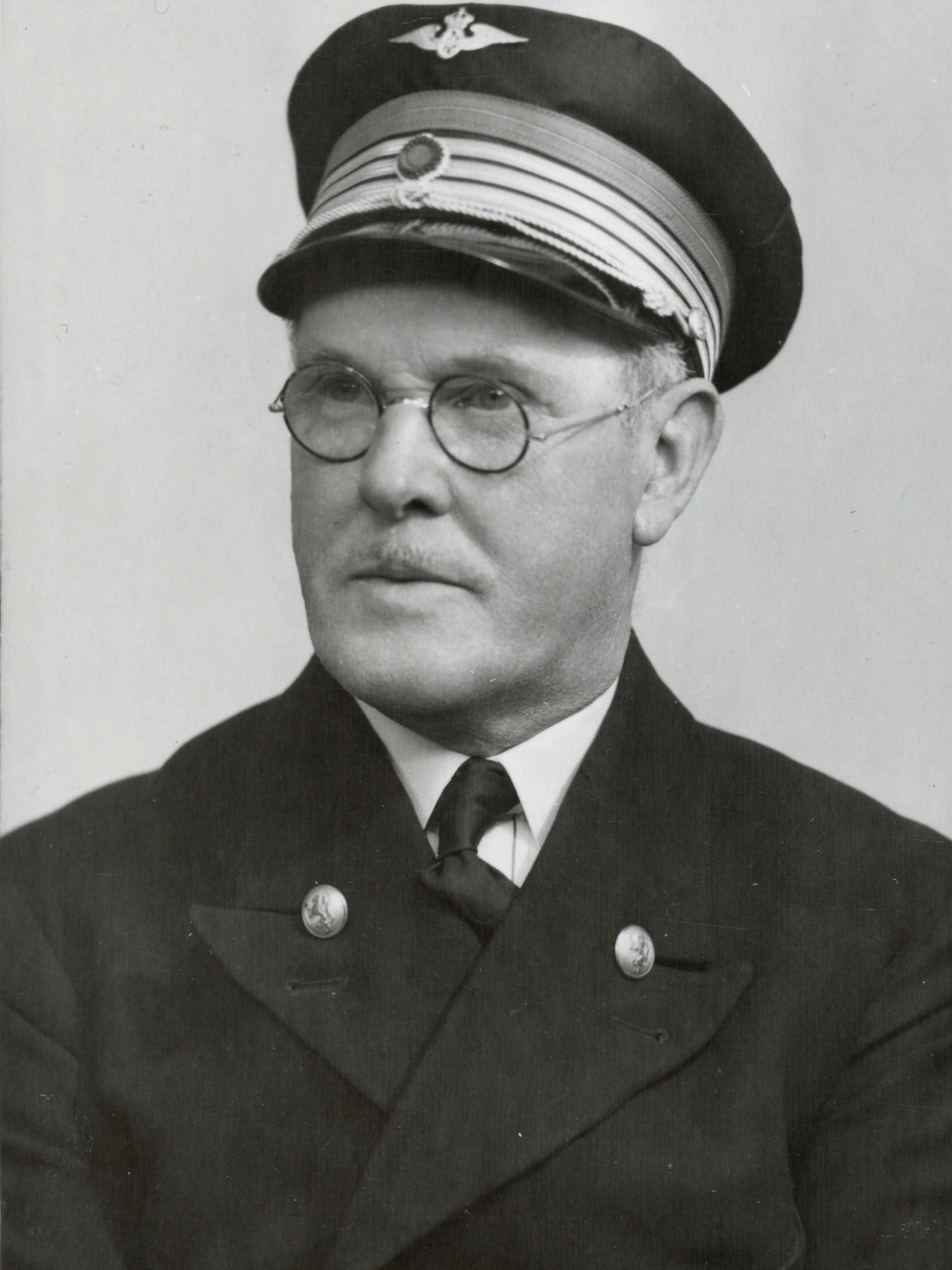

Personal information
- Born: Fritz Ludvig Fredrik Skullerud; 25 February 1885 Kristiania, Norway
- Died: 24 May 1969 (aged 84) Oslo, Norway
- Other interests: Train stations

Sport
- Country: Norway
- Sport: Long-distance running
- Club: IF Ørnulf

Fritz Ludvig Fredrik Skullerud (25 February 1885 – 24 May 1969) was a Norwegian long-distance runner and railway station master. Competing as a runner in the 1906 Intercalated Games, he did not finish any event. His career in the Norges Statsbaner was spent as station master at Hauketo Station, Billingstad Station and Stabekk Station.

== Biography ==
Fritz Ludvig Fredrik Skullerud was born on 25 February 1885, in Kristiania (today Oslo). His father was Edvard Olsen Skullerud, a supervising officer at Botsfengselet, and his mother was Sophie Bjørklund.

Skullerud was affiliated with IF Ørnulf. He set a Norwegian record for a 10,000 metres run on 24 July 1904 in Oslo, with a time of 35:05.4. The record was broken by Oscar Elton on 19 June 1910, with a time of 34:26.5. Skullerud participated in the 1906 Intercalated Games as a long-distance runner. He did not finish the 5 miles run and was not present at the start of the marathon.

Karl Haagensen's book Athenfærden 1906 was critical towards Skullerud. In May 1907, Ørnulf chairman Carl Pedersen wrote an open letter to Norsk idrætsblad critiquing Haagensen. In response, Haagensen claiming that Skullerud gave up after the second round during the 1906 Intercalated Games, expressing disappointment in Skullerud's participation and astonishment over Pedersen's characterization of Haagensen's claim. In Skullerud's rebuttal, he wrote that he ran for three and a half rounds, contrary to Haagensen's claim. On 20 June 1907, Haagensen ended the debate by calling Skullerud's participation a fiasco.

Skullerud served as the station master of Hauketo Station for 11 years, followed by the same job at Billingstad station from 1936. He served as the station master of Stabekk Station from 1945 until his resignation in 1950. He was an inaugural board member of the eighth department of the Norwegian Railway Temperance Association. He died on 24 May 1969, aged 84, in Oslo.

== Works cited ==
- Reiersrud, Fillip, ed. (1943). Norsk jernbane-avholdsforbund 1893-1943 (in Norwegian). Drammen.
- Fladvad, Thorbjørn A.; Lund, Alf Chr; Jacobsen, Gunnar, eds. (1946). Idrettsforeningen Ørnulf gjennom 50 år : 1893-1943 (in Norwegian). Oslo: IF Ørnulf.
- Hohle, Per; Straume, Joh.B.; Ingskog, Erling W. (1959). De Norske jernbaner og deres personale. Norges jernbanepersonale : personalbiografier (in Norwegian). Oslo: Norsk arkivforsking.
- Bryhn, Rolf; Tvedt, Knut Are, eds. (1990). Kunnskapsforlagets idrettsleksikon (in Norwegian). Oslo: Kunnskapsforlaget. ISBN 8257304085.
- Heyerdahl, Thorolf (1991). OL fram til 1908: en annotert bibliografi over de første olympiske leker i moderne tid (in Norwegian). Oslo: Norges Idrettshøgskole, Institutt for Samfunnsfag, Seksjon for Idrettshistorie. ISBN 8250202724.
- Møst, Aage, ed. (1995). Raskest, høyest, lengst i 100 år: norsk friidrett, 1896-1996 (in Norwegian). Oslo: Norges fri-idrettsforbund : Universitetsforlaget. ISBN 8200225917.
