= Carl Kruckenberg =

Swedish Army officer and equestrian (1881–1940)

Carl Wilhelm Kruckenberg (October 27, 1881 – November 7, 1940) was a Swedish Army officer and horse rider who competed in the 1912 Summer Olympics.

He finished eighth in the Individual dressage competition with his horse Kartusch.

Kruckenberg was ryttmästare in the Swedish Army.
