= Bror Flygare =

Swedish wrestler

- Born: 29 November 1888; Malmö, Sweden
- Died: 18 August 1943 (aged 54); Malmö, Sweden

Bror Edvin Flygare (29 November 1888 – 18 August 1943) was a Swedish wrestler. He competed in the lightweight event at the 1912 Summer Olympics.
