= Árpád Szántó =

Hungarian wrestler (1889–1984)

- Born: 10 October 1889; Kézdivásárhely, Austria-Hungary (now Târgu Secuiesc, Romania)
- Died: September 1984 (aged 94)

Árpád Szántó (10 October 1889 – September 1984) was a Hungarian wrestler. He competed in the lightweight event at the 1912 Summer Olympics.
