= Halfdan Bjølgerud =

Norwegian high jumper

Halfdan Bjølgerud (13 February 1884 – 18 April 1970) was a Norwegian high jumper. He represented Ørnulf IF in Kristiania.

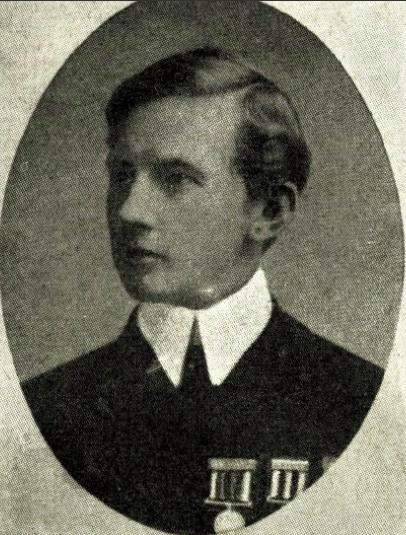

At the 1906 Summer Olympics he finished sixth in the high jump final with a jump of 1.67 metres. He became Norwegian champion in 1903 and 1906.
