= Equestrian at the 1912 Summer Olympics – Individual dressage =

Equestrian at the Olympics

Individual dressage at the Games of the V Olympiad
- Date: 15 July
- Competitors: 21 from 8 nations

Medalists
1st place, gold medalist(s)		Carl Bonde	Sweden
2nd place, silver medalist(s)		Gustaf Adolf Boltenstern	Sweden
3rd place, bronze medalist(s)		Hans von Blixen-Finecke	Sweden

The individual dressage was an equestrian event held as part of the Equestrian at the 1912 Summer Olympics programme. It was the first appearance of the event. The Swedish team dominated the event, taking all three medals and having all six riders place within the top eight.

== Results ==
Place	Rider and Horse	Total
Final
Gold	Carl Bonde and Emperor (SWE)	15
Silver	Gustaf Adolf Boltenstern and Neptun (SWE)	21
Bronze	Hans von Blixen-Finecke and Maggie (SWE)	32
4	Friedrich von Oesterley and Condor (GER)	36
5	Carl Rosenblad and Miss Hastings (SWE)	43
6	Oscar af Ström and Irish Lass (SWE)	47
7	Felix Bürkner and King (GER)	51
8	Carl Kruckenberg and Kartusch (SWE)	51
9	Mikhail Yekimov and Tritonych (RU1)	62
10	Gaston Seigner and Dignité (FRA)	73
11	Andreas von Flotow and Senta (GER)	77
12	Carl von Moers and New Bank (GER)	83
13	Guy Henry and Chiswell (USA)	93
14	Jacques Cariou and Mignon (FRA)	94
15	Jens Falkenberg and King (NOR)	103
16	Rudolf Keyper and Kinley Princess (DEN)	111
17	Gaston de Trannoy and Capricieux (BEL)	117
18	Carl Saunte and Streg (DEN)	120
19	Pierre Dufour d'Astafort and Castibalza (FRA)	123
20	John Montgomery and Deceive (USA)	130
21	Emmanuel de Blommaert and Clonmore (BEL)	135

== Sources ==
- Bergvall, Erik (ed.) (1913). Adams-Ray, Edward (trans.). (ed.). The Official Report of the Olympic Games of Stockholm 1912. Stockholm: Wahlström & Widstrand.
- Wudarski, Pawel (1999). "Wyniki Igrzysk Olimpijskich" (in Polish). Archived from the original on 16 February 2009.
