= Andreas Dumrauf =

German wrestler

- Born: 29 December 1888; Kirchschletten, Kingdom of Bavaria, German Empire
- Died: 23 January 1955 (aged 66); Bamberg, West Germany

Andreas Dumrauf (29 December 1888 – 23 January 1955) was a German wrestler. He competed in the lightweight event at the 1912 Summer Olympics.
