= William Hayes (wrestler) =

British wrestler

William Hayes (20 April 1891 – 2 August 1972) was a British wrestler. He competed in the lightweight event at the 1912 Summer Olympics.
