= Rudolf Rydström =

Swedish wrestler

- Born: 11 April 1886; Stockholm, Sweden
- Died: 23 May 1929 (aged 43); Stockholm, Sweden

Rudolf Rydström (11 April 1886 – 23 May 1929) was a Swedish wrestler. He competed in the lightweight event at the 1912 Summer Olympics.
