= Otto Lasanen =

Finnish wrestler (1891–1958)

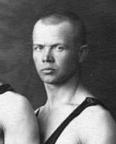
- Lasanen (right) in 1921

Personal information
- Born: 14 April 1891 Kuopio, Finland
- Died: 25 July 1958 (aged 67) Asikkala, Finland
- Height: 166 cm (5 ft 5 in)
- Weight: 62 kg (137 lb)

Sport
- Sport: Greco-Roman wrestling
Medal record
Men's Greco-Roman wrestling
Representing Finland
Olympic Games
Bronze medal – third place	1912 Stockholm	Featherweight

Otto Abraham Lasanen (14 April 1891 – 25 July 1958) was a featherweight Greco-Roman wrestler from Finland. He won a bronze medal at the 1912 Summer Olympics and placed fourth at the 1914 unofficial European Championships. In 1917 he won a Russian title, as Finland was part of Russia then. Lasanen was a car driver by profession.
