= Karl Johnson (wrestler) =

Swedish wrestler

- Born: 13 November 1883; Grästorp, Sweden
- Died: 6 November 1952 (aged 68); Burbank, California, United States

Karl Johnson (13 September 1883 – 6 November 1952) was a Swedish wrestler. He competed in the lightweight event at the 1912 Summer Olympics.

Johnson, also known as the "Terrible Swede", fought in the United States, based in Chicago, in mixed style challenge matches, including Cornish wrestling.
