= Thorbjørn Frydenlund =

Norwegian wrestler

- Born: 15 November 1892; Oslo, Norway
- Died: 13 February 1989 (aged 96); Oslo, Norway

Thorbjørn Frydenlund (15 November 1892 – 13 February 1989) was a Norwegian wrestler.

He competed in Greco-Roman lightweight at the 1912 Summer Olympics. He was a brother of Richard Frydenlund, and both represented the club IF Ørnulf.
