= Georg Gerstäcker =

German wrestler (1889–1949)

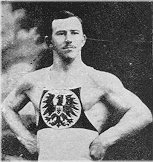
- Born: 3 June 1889; Nürnberg, German Empire
- Died: 21 December 1949 (aged 60); Nürnberg, West Germany
Medal record
Men's Greco-Roman wrestling
Representing Germany
Olympic Games
Silver medal – second place	1912 Stockholm	Featherweight

Georg Gerstäcker (3 June 1889 – 21 December 1949) was a German wrestler who competed in the 1912 Summer Olympics. He won the silver medal in the featherweight event.
