= Carl Rosenblad (equestrian) =

Swedish horse rider

Carl Axel Eberhart Rosenblad (25 August 1886 – 24 January 1953) was a Swedish horse rider who competed in the 1912 Summer Olympics. He finished fifth in the Individual dressage competition with his horse Miss Hastings.
