= Thorvald Olsen =

Norwegian wrestler

- Born: 30 July 1889; Oslo, Norway
- Died: 2 November 1938 (aged 49); Oslo, Norway

Thorvald Matheus "Torden" Olsen (30 July 1889 – 2 November 1938) was a Norwegian wrestler and sports official.

He became the Norwegian champion in his weight class in 1912, 1914, 1915, and 1918. He became Nordic champion in 1918. He represented the club IF Ørnulf. He also wrestled two bouts at the 1912 Olympic Games, both against Finns.

Olsen was a board member of Arbeidernes Idrettsopposisjon from its inception in May 1922. After the creation of the Workers' Confederation of Sports in 1924, Olsen became Norwegian workers' champion in wrestling in 1925, 1927 and 1928. He served as a board member of the Workers' Confederation of Sports from 1925 to 1927, a deputy board member from 1927 to 1928, and chairman from 1928 to 1931. He was responsible for arranging the Winter Spartakiad in 1928.

IF Ørnulf was not a workers' sports club, thus Olsen resigned his membership. He then set out to replace the distinguished wrestling club for union workers, Fagforeningenes IF, which had left the Workers' Confederation of Sports in 1926. Olsen founded a new club, Fagforeningenes IF av 1926, quickly achieving sporting success. Olsen was also a wrestling coach in the club SK Sleipner. Olsen died of a stroke in November 1938.

Sporting positions
Preceded by Thor Jørgensen	Chairman of the Workers' Confederation of Sports; 1928-1931	Succeeded by Trygve Lie
