= Alrik Sandberg =

Swedish wrestler

- Born: 3 April 1885; Eskilstuna, Sweden
- Died: 26 February 1975 (aged 89); Saltsjöbaden, Sweden

Alrik Mikael Sandberg (3 April 1885 – 26 February 1975) was a Swedish wrestler. He competed in the heavyweight event at the 1912 Summer Olympics.

Sandberg represented Djurgårdens IF.
