= Laurent Gerstmans =

Belgian wrestler

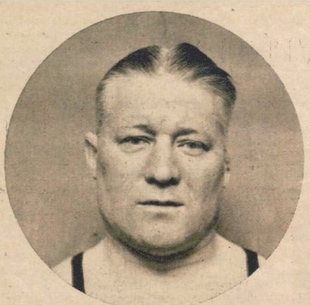
- Born: 26 February 1885; Antwerp, Belgium
- Died: April 3, 1955

Laurent Gerstmans (26 February 1885 – 3 April 1955) was a Belgian wrestler. He competed in the heavyweight event at the 1912 Summer Olympics.

== Information ==
Gerstmans was a dock worker originally. He was said to be a legend of the Antwerp wrestling scene and was nicknamed, "Apollo". He was a European wrestling champion and had once competed for a version of the world heavyweight title. Gertmans also competed as a professional boxer and once defeated Japanese jiu-hitsu legend Mikinosuke Kawaishi in a match. Gertsmans wrestled in places such as England and Madison Square Garden throughout his career.

After retiring from the ring, he opened Café Jozef in Astridplein. He was later honored with a mural on Constitutiestraat 11 street in Antwerp, Belgium. In 2015, a professional wrestling tournament was held in Antwerp called the "Laurent Gerstmans Cup".
