= Ludwig Sauerhöfer =

German wrestler

- Born: 5 March 1883; Ludwigshafen, Germany
- Died: 15 October 1914 (aged 31)

Ludwig Sauerhöfer (5 March 1883 – 15 October 1914) was a German wrestler. He competed in the lightweight event at the 1912 Summer Olympics. He was killed in action in World War I.

== See also ==
- List of Olympians killed in World War I
