= Alessandro Covre =

Italian wrestler

- Born: Verona, Italy
- Died: 1951; Verona, Italy

Alessandro Covre (date of birth unknown, died 1951) was an Italian wrestler who competed in the lightweight event at the 1912 Summer Olympics.
