= Paul Tirkkonen =

Finnish wrestler (1884–1968)

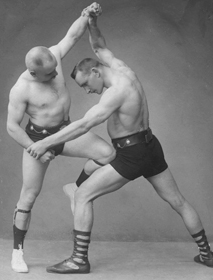
- Tirkkonen (left) and Iivari Tuomisto

Personal information
- Born: 9 October 1884 Helsinki, Finland
- Died: 31 August 1968 (aged 83) Helsinki, Finland

Sport
- Sport: Greco-Roman wrestling
- Club: HAK, Helsinki
Medal record
Representing Finland
World Championships
Bronze medal – third place	1911 Helsinki	-67 kg

Paul Ernst Vilhelm Tirkkonen (9 October 1884 – 31 August 1968) was a lightweight Greco-Roman wrestler from Finland who won a bronze medal at the 1911 World Championships. Next year, he competed at the 1912 Olympics, but was eliminated in the second round. His brother Theodor competed alongside him in a heavier weight category.
