= Franz Lemnitz =

German cyclist

Personal information
- Born: 11 July 1890 Tollwitz, German Empire
- Died: 2 November 1963 (aged 73) Leipzig, East Germany

Cycling career
- Sport: Cycling

Franz Lemnitz (11 July 1890 – 2 November 1963) was a German road racing cyclist who competed in the 1912 Summer Olympics. He was born in Tollwitz. In 1912, he was a member of the German cycling team, which finished sixth in the team time trial event. In the individual time trial competition he finished 26th.
