= Felix Bürkner =

German equestrian (1883–1957)

Personal information
- Nationality: German
- Born: 15 May 1883; Göttingen, German Empire
- Died: 17 November 1957 (aged 74); Hanover, West Germany

Sport
- Sport: Equestrian

Felix Bürkner (15 May 1883 – 17 November 1957) was a German equestrian. He competed in the individual dressage event at the 1912 Summer Olympics.
