= Gustaf Lindstrand =

Swedish wrestler

Frans Lindstrand
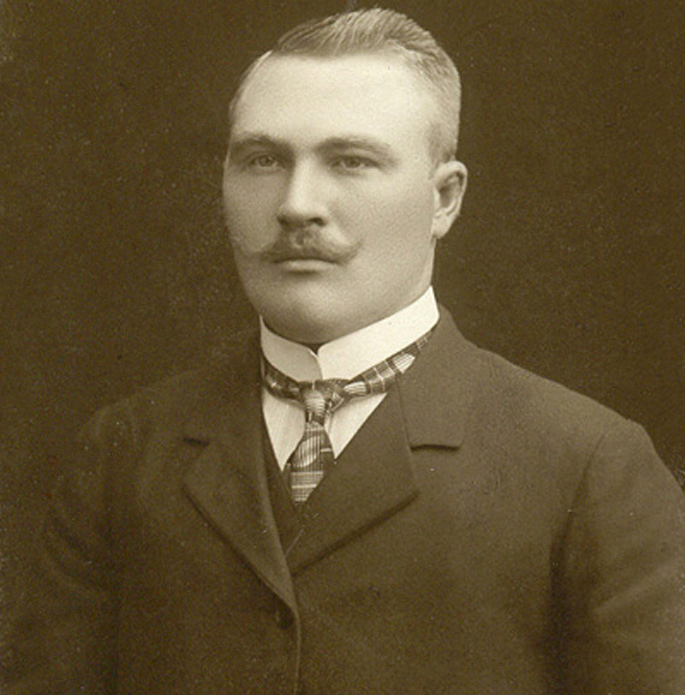

Personal information
- Born: 11 February 1883 Älmhult, Sweden
- Died: 26 March 1959 (aged 76) Malmö, Sweden

Sport
- Sport: Greco-Roman wrestling
- Club: GAK Enighet, Malmö

Frans Gustaf Johansson Lindstrand (11 February 1883 – 26 March 1959) was a Swedish wrestler. He competed in the Greco-Roman heavyweight event at the 1912 Summer Olympics, but was eliminated in the third bout.
