= Otto Männel =

German cyclist

Personal information
- Born: 27 June 1887 Schilbach, German Empire
- Died: 11 June 1964 (aged 76) Karlsruhe, West Germany

Cycling career
- Sport: Cycling

Otto Männel (27 June 1887 – 11 June 1964) was a German cyclist. He competed in two events at the 1912 Summer Olympics.
