= Karl Groß (wrestler) =

German wrestler

- Born: 30 January 1884; Mannheim, Germany
- Died: 14 July 1941 (aged 57); Ludwigshafen, Germany

Karl Ferdinand Groß (30 January 1884 – 14 July 1941) was a German wrestler. He competed in the light heavyweight event at the 1912 Summer Olympics.
