= Johan Olin =

Finnish wrestler (1883–1928)

- Born: 30 June 1883; Vihti, Finland
- Died: 3 December 1928 (aged 45); Ingå, Finland
Medal record
Men's Greco-Roman wrestling
Representing Finland
Olympic Games
| Silver medal – second place | 1912 Stockholm | Heavyweight |

Johan Fredrik "John" Olin (30 June 1883 – 3 December 1928) was a Finnish wrestler who competed in the 1912 Summer Olympics. He won the silver medal in the heavyweight class.

In 1916, Olin captured a claim to the World Heavyweight championship after a controversial bout with Joe Stecher in Springfield, Massachusetts. On 12 December 1916, in one of the great forgotten matches and upsets in wrestling history, he defeated Stecher. After 2 hrs and 40 min., both wrestlers ended up outside the ring brawling. Olin wanted to continue but Stecher declined to return to the ring. Olin was awarded the bout by the referee. Stecher injured his shoulder during the match and was out of the ring for over 1 1/2 months. In newspaper reports no mention of the title is made. Why the public continued to support Stecher is unclear. John Olin's promoters claimed the World Title but Olin was mild mannered and didn't make much noise about being the champion. It may be that the press refused to accept Olin as champion because his win was fluke due to injury and no one believe Olin could truly defeat Stecher. Also Frank Gotch was still alive at the time and many still saw him as the "real" world champion. As Stecher didn't consider himself defeated, the idea of Olin as champ had much going against it. This claim to the title, called the Olin Line by historians, did continue. Olin lost his claim "world title" to Ed "Strangler" Lewis in Chicago on 2 May 1917. After 2 hours and 37 minutes, John Olin concedes match due to a shoulder injury. Referee was Frank Gotch and he praised Lewis as the best. The Strangler would not be as mild manner as Olin, and actively claimed the title. Olin resided in Worcester, Massachusetts during his stay in the United States, and wrestled as a professional for several years. He died in Ingå, Finland.
