= Richard Frydenlund =

Norwegian wrestler

- Born: 1 May 1891; Oslo, Norway
- Died: 20 January 1981 (aged 89); Oslo, Norway

Richard Cornelius Frydenlund (1 May 1891 – 20 January 1981) was a Norwegian wrestler.

He competed at the 1912 Summer Olympics, and at the 1920 Summer Olympics in Antwerp where he placed fifth in Greco-Roman lightweight. He was a brother of Thorbjørn Frydenlund, and both represented the club IF Ørnulf.
