= Aatami Tanttu =

Finnish wrestler (1887–1939)

- Born: 24 December 1887; Hirvensalmi, Finland
- Died: 26 December 1939 (aged 52); Kotka, Finland

Aatami Tanttu (24 December 1887 – 26 December 1939) was a Finnish wrestler. He competed in the lightweight event at the 1912 Summer Olympics.
