= Vihtori Urvikko =

Finnish wrestler

- Born: 29 April 1889; Urjala, Finland
- Died: 2 April 1961 (aged 71); Tampere, Finland

Vihtori Urvikko (29 April 1889 – 2 April 1961) was a Finnish wrestler. He competed in the lightweight event at the 1912 Summer Olympics.
