= Adolf Kurz =

German wrestler

- Born: 22 April 1888; Göppingen, Germany
- Died: 1959 (aged 70–71)

Adolf Kurz (22 April 1888 – 1959) was a German wrestler. He competed in the middleweight event at the 1912 Summer Olympics.
