= David Kolehmainen =

Finnish wrestler (1885–1918)

- Born: 10 September 1885; Eura, Finland
- Died: 7 April 1918 (aged 32); Helsinki, Finland

David "Tatu" Kolehmainen (10 September 1885 – 7 April 1918) was a Finnish wrestler. He competed in the lightweight event at the 1912 Summer Olympics.

During the Finnish Civil War, Kolehmainen fought for the Red Guards and was killed in action at the Battle of Tampere.
