= Gustaf Malmström =

Swedish wrestler (1884–1970)

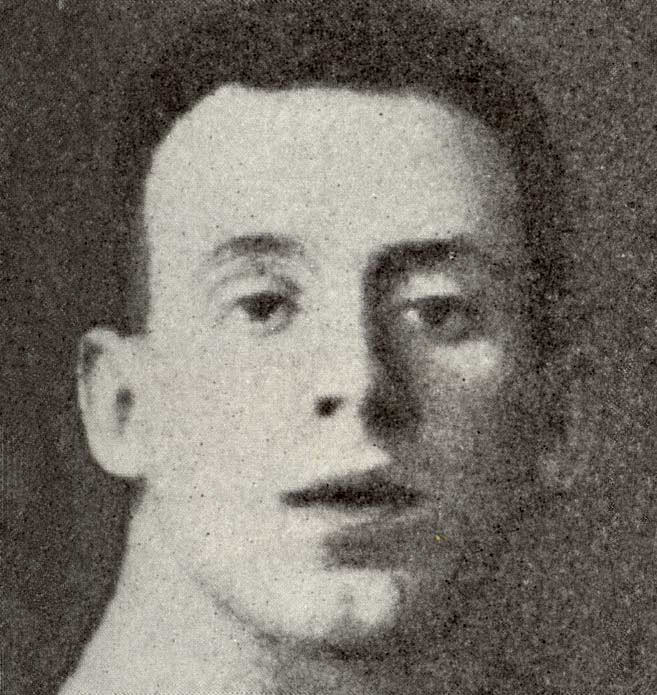

Personal information
- Born: 4 July 1884 Malmö, Sweden
- Died: 24 December 1970 (aged 86) Malmö, Sweden

Sport
- Sport: Greco-Roman wrestling
- Club: GAK Enighet, Malmö; IK Sparta, Malmö
Medal record
Men's Greco-Roman wrestling
Representing Sweden
Olympic Games
| Silver medal – second place | 1912 Stockholm | Lightweight |
World Championships
| Silver medal – second place | 1911 Helsinki | 67 kg |

Gustaf Hjalmar Malmström (4 July 1884 – 24 December 1970) was a lightweight Greco-Roman wrestler from Sweden. He competed at the 1908 and 1912 Summer Olympics and finished in fifth and second place, respectively. Earlier he won a silver medal at the 1911 World Championships and two gold medals at the 1907 and 1909 unofficial European championships.
