= Alfred Salonen =

Finnish wrestler

Johan Salonen
- Born: 9 March 1884; Heinola, Finland
- Died: 11 January 1939 (aged 54)

Johan Alfred Salonen (9 March 1884 – 11 January 1939) was a Finnish wrestler. He competed in the lightweight event at the 1912 Summer Olympics.
