= Hugo Björklund =

Swedish wrestler (1885–1963)

- Born: 23 November 1885; Nyköping, Sweden
- Died: May 1963; Massachusetts, United States

Hugo Björklund (23 November 1885 – May 1963) was a Swedish wrestler. He competed in the lightweight event at the 1912 Summer Olympics.
