= Kalle Viljamaa =

Finnish wrestler (1885–1918)

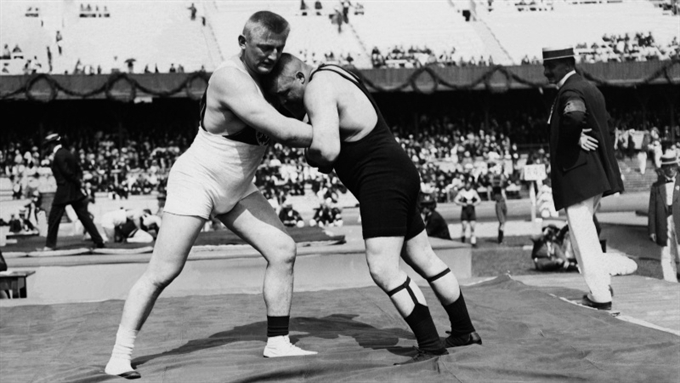
- Kalle Viljamaa (left) and Jean Hauptmanns in the 1912 Olympics
- Born: 15 March 1885; Tampere, Grand Duchy of Finland
- Died: 28 March 1918 (aged 33); Tampere, Finland

Kalle Albinus Viljamaa (15 March 1885 – 28 March 1918) was a Finnish wrestler. He competed in the heavyweight event at the 1912 Summer Olympics.

Viljamaa died of White Guard artillery shelling during the Finnish Civil War Battle of Tampere.
