= József Sándor (wrestler) =

Hungarian wrestler (born 1892)

- Born: 6 August 1892; Jászárokszállás, Hungary

József Sándor (born 6 August 1892, date of death unknown) was a Hungarian wrestler. He competed in the lightweight event at the 1912 Summer Olympics.
