= Barend Bonneveld =

Dutch wrestler (1887–1978)

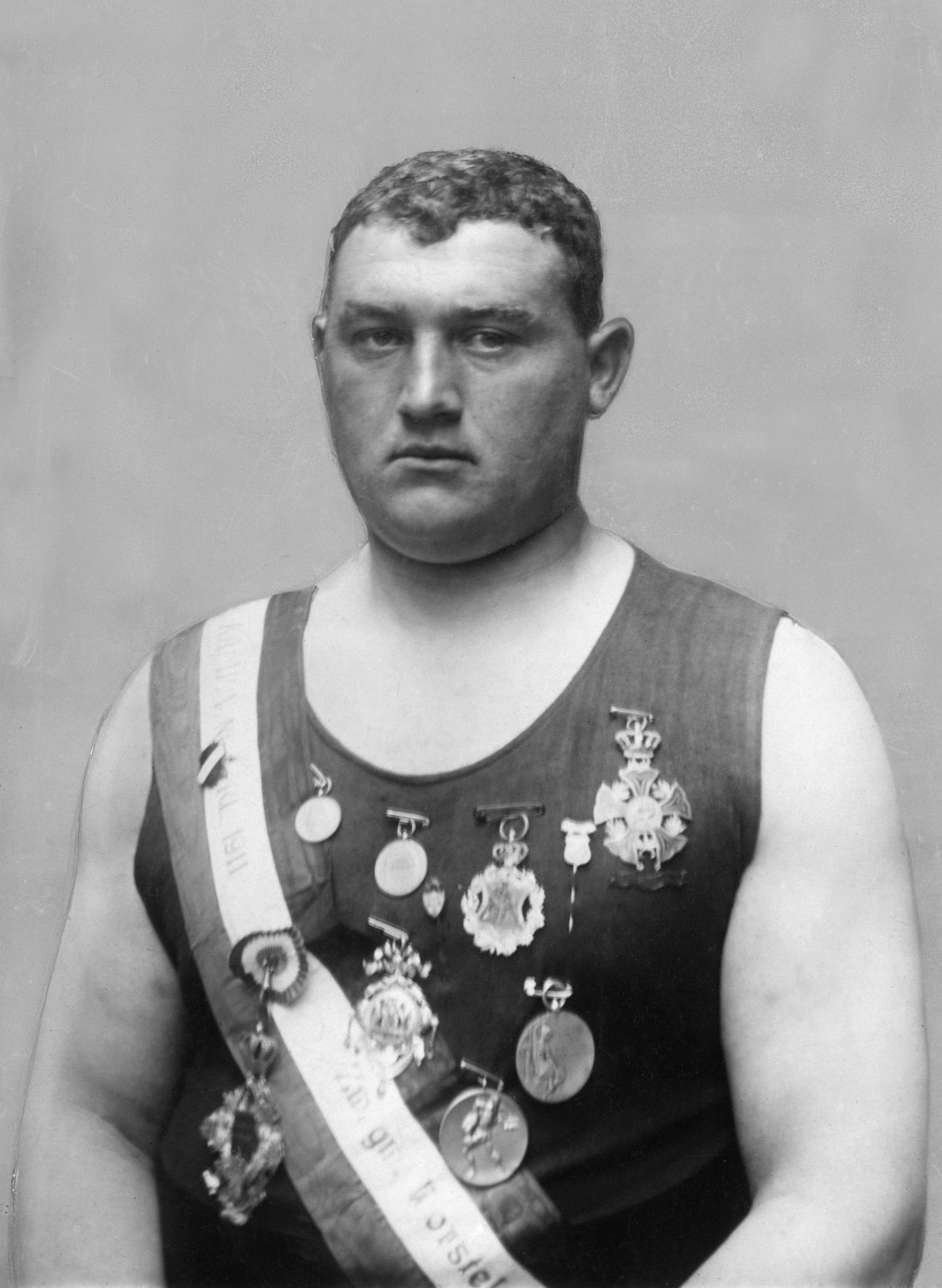
- Barend Bonneveld at the 1912 Olympics

Personal information
- Born: 27 November 1887 Diemen, Netherlands
- Died: 9 February 1978 (aged 90) Amsterdam, Netherlands

Sport
- Sport: Greco-Roman wrestling
- Club: Hercules, Amsterdam

Barend Bonneveld (27 November 1887 – 9 February 1978) was a Dutch heavyweight wrestler. He competed at the 1912 Summer Olympics and the 1920 Summer Olympics in Greco-Roman wrestling.
