= Carl Lund (wrestler) =

Swedish wrestler (1884–1940)

- Born: 23 September 1884; Gothenburg, Sweden
- Died: 29 May 1940 (aged 55); Kungsbacka, Sweden

Carl Lund (23 September 1884 – 29 May 1940) was a Swedish wrestler. He competed at the 1908 Summer Olympics and the 1912 Summer Olympics.
