= Oskar Kaplur =

Estonian wrestler (1889–1962)

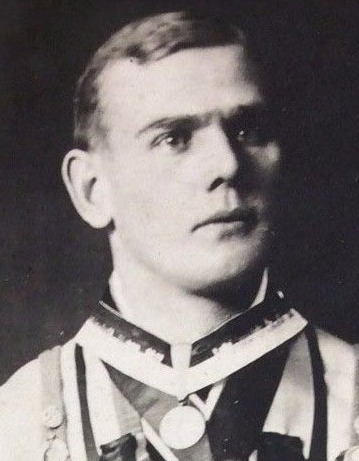
- Born: 20 September 1889; Reval, Governorate of Estonia, Russian Empire
- Died: 20 September 1962 (aged 73); Moscow, Russian SFSR, Soviet Union
- Olympic team: Russia

Oskar Kaplur (Russian: Оска́р Фри́дрихович Каплю́р; 20 September [O.S. 8 September] 1889 – 20 September 1962) was an Estonian wrestler. He competed for the Russian Empire in the lightweight event at the 1912 Summer Olympics.

He lived in the United States from 1913 to 1918 but returned to Russia in 1918 and worked in the aircraft industry. He was known as the inventor of Kaplyurit plastic-impregnated plywood reinforced with internal steel gauze.
