= Ödön Radvány =

Hungarian wrestler

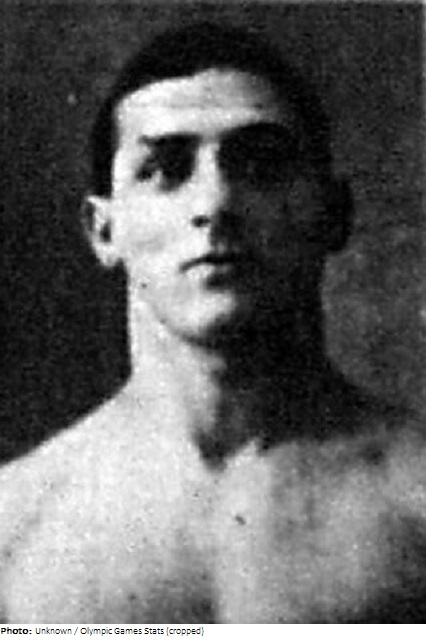
- Ödön Radvány
- Born: 27 December 1888; Budapest, Hungary
- Died: 20 April 1959 (aged 70); Budapest, Hungary

Ödön Radvány (27 December 1888 – 20 April 1959) was a Hungarian wrestler. He competed at the 1908, 1912 and the 1924 Summer Olympics.
