= Edvin Mattiasson =

Swedish wrestler

Edvin Mathiasson
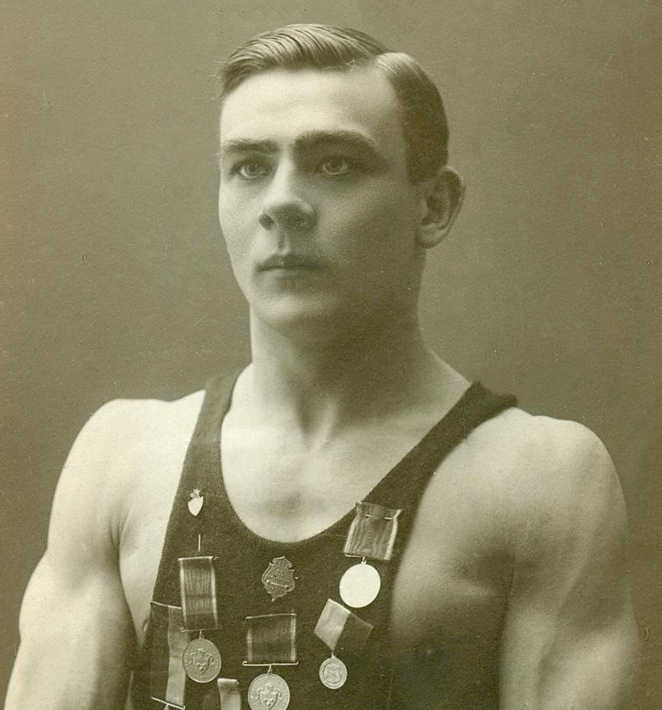

Personal information
- Born: 16 April 1890 Trelleborg, Sweden
- Died: 15 March 1975 (aged 84) Malmö, Sweden

Sport
- Sport: Greco-Roman wrestling
Medal record
Men's Greco-Roman wrestling
Representing Sweden
Olympic Games
Bronze medal – third place	1912 Stockholm	Lightweight

Berndt Edvin Mattiasson (16 or 18 April 1890 – 15 March 1975) was a Greco-Roman wrestler from Sweden who won a bronze medal in the lightweight division at the 1912 Summer Olympics.

His official records were mixed up, listing his birth date either as 16 or 18 April. They also named him Mathiasson, while he called himself Mattiasson through most of his life. In 1916, he married Selma Karolina, a woman one year his elder who survived him by 12 years.
