= Karel Halík =

Czech wrestler

- Born: 20 December 1883; Prague, Austria-Hungary

Karel Josef Halík (born 20 December 1883, date of death unknown) was a Czech wrestler. He competed for Bohemia at the 1906, 1908 and 1912 Summer Olympics and for Czechoslovakia at the 1920 Summer Olympics.
