= Johan Nilsson (wrestler) =

Swedish wrestler

- Born: 2 December 1890; Malmö, Sweden
- Died: 10 August 1959 (aged 68); Arlöv, Sweden

Johan Nilsson (2 December 1890 – 10 August 1959) was a Swedish wrestler. He competed in the lightweight event at the 1912 Summer Olympics.
