= Jan Balej (wrestler) =

Czech wrestler

- Born: 20 May 1893; Žižkov, Austria-Hungary

Jan Balej (born 20 May 1893, date of death unknown) was a Czech wrestler. He competed for Bohemia at the 1912 Summer Olympics and for Czechoslovakia at the 1920 Summer Olympics.
