= Ivar Böhling =

Finnish wrestler (1889–1929)

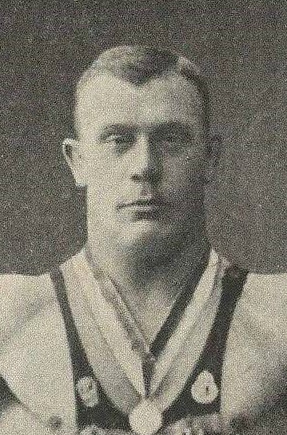

Personal information
- Born: 10 September 1889 Ingå, Finland
- Died: 12 January 1929 (aged 39) Vyborg, Finland (today in Russia)

Sport
- Sport: Greco-Roman wrestling
- Club: Viipurin Voimailijat, Vyborg
Medal record
Men's Greco-Roman wrestling
Representing Finland
Olympic Games
Silver medal – second place	1912 Stockholm	Light heavyweight

Ivar Theodor Böhling (10 September 1889 – 12 January 1929) was a Finnish wrestler who competed in the 1912 Summer Olympics.

He won the silver medal in the light heavyweight class. In a remarkable final, he wrestled for nine hours against the other finalist, the Swedish wrestler Anders Ahlgren, before it was declared a draw. The judges refused to award a gold medal, stating that the champion had to have won the final match. Thus, they both were given second place, and no gold medal was awarded.

Böhling won the 1914 Unofficial European title in the light-heavyweight division and four national titles: two in light-heavyweight (1911 and 1913) and two in heavyweight (1915 and 1916). He then turned professional and retired in 1920.
