= The Boat Race 1911 =

68th Boat Race
- Date: 1 April 1911
- Winner: Oxford
- Margin of victory: 2 3/4 lengths
- Winning time: 18 minutes 29 seconds
- Overall record (Cambridge–Oxford): 30–37
- Umpire: Frederick I. Pitman (Cambridge)

The 68th Boat Race took place on 1 April 1911. Held annually, the Boat Race is a side-by-side rowing race between crews from the Universities of Oxford and Cambridge along the River Thames. Oxford went into the race as reigning champions, having won the previous year's race. Umpired by former Cambridge rower Frederick I. Pitman, Oxford won by 2 3/4 lengths in a time of 18 minutes 29 seconds, taking their overall lead in the competition to 37–30.

== Background ==
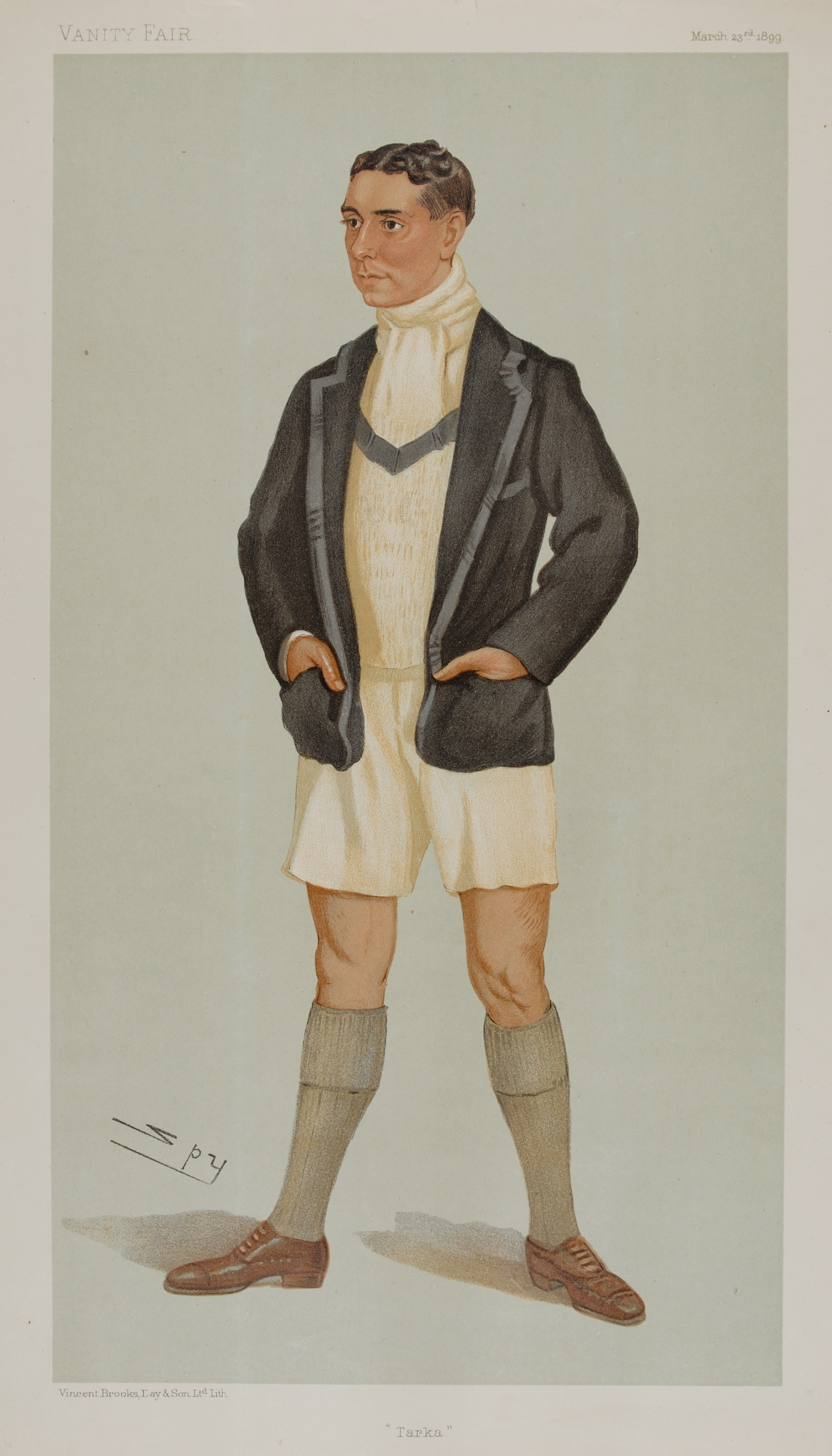
Harcourt Gilbey Gold, the previous president of the Oxford University Boat Club, coached the Dark Blues for the 1911 race.

The Boat Race is a side-by-side rowing competition between the University of Oxford (sometimes referred to as the "Dark Blues") and the University of Cambridge (sometimes referred to as the "Light Blues"). The race was first held in 1829, and since 1845 has taken place on the 4.2-mile (6.8 km) Championship Course on the River Thames in southwest London. The rivalry is a major point of honour between the two universities; it is followed throughout the United Kingdom and, as of 2015, broadcast worldwide. Oxford went into the race as reigning champions, having won the 1910 race by 3 1/2 lengths, and led overall with 36 victories to Cambridge's 30 (excluding the "dead heat" of 1877).

Oxford's coaches were H. R. Barker (who rowed for the Dark Blues in the 1908 and 1909 races), G. C. Bourne (who had rowed for the university in the 1882 and 1883 races), and Harcourt Gilbey Gold (Dark Blue president for the 1900 race and four-time Blue). Cambridge were coached by Stanley Bruce (who had rowed in 1904), William Dudley Ward (who had rowed in 1897, 1899 and 1900 races), Raymond Etherington-Smith (who had rowed in 1898 and 1900) and H. W. Willis (who had previously coached Oxford in 1907). For the eighth year the umpire was old Etonian Frederick I. Pitman who rowed for Cambridge in the 1884, 1885 and 1886 races.

The race was watched from the Oxford launch by the Prince of Wales and his brother Prince Albert. It was also the first time the launches were accompanied by aeroplanes.

== Crews ==
The Oxford crew weighed an average of 12 st 7.5 lb (79.4 kg), 3.625 pounds (1.6 kg) per rower more than their opponents. Six of the Cambridge crew had previous Boat Race experience, including R. W. M. Arbuthnot and J. B. Rosher, who were taking part in their third event. Oxford's boat contained three rowers who had previously participated three times in the event, in Duncan Mackinnon, Robert Bourne and Stanley Garton. Six of the Dark Blues were studying at Magdalen College, five of whom had rowed to victory in the Grand Challenge Cup at the Henley Royal Regatta the previous July. Three participants in the race were registered as overseas Blues: Oxford's Charles Littlejohn was Australian, while Cambridge's Pieter Voltelyn Graham van der Byl and cox C. A. Skinner hailed from South Africa.

Seat	Oxford			Cambridge		
Seat	Name	College	Weight	Name	College	Weight
Bow	C. E. Tinné	University	12 st 2.5 lb	S. E. Swann	Trinity Hall	11 st 8 lb
2	L. G. Wormald	Magdalen	12 st 7 lb	P. V. G. Van der Byl	Pembroke	12 st 2.5 lb
3	R. E. Burgess	Magdalen	12 st 2.5 lb	F. E. Hellyer	1st Trinity	12 st 0 lb
4	E. J. H. V. Millington-Drake	Magdalen	12 st 8 lb	C. F. Burnand	1st Trinity	12 st 4 lb
5	C. W. B. Littlejohn	New College	12 st 13.5 lb	C. R. le Blanc Smith	3rd Trinity	13 st 3 lb
6	A. S. Garton	Magdalen	13 st 8 lb	J. B. Rosher (P)	1st Trinity	14 st 6.5 lb
7	D. Mackinnon	Magdalen	13 st 5.5 lb	G. E. Fairbairn	Jesus	11 st 13 lb
Stroke	R. C. Bourne (P)	Christ Church	10 st 13.5 lb	R. W. M. Arbuthnot	3rd Trinity	10 st 8 lb
Cox	H. B. Wells	Magdalen	8 st 5 lb	C. A. Skinner	Jesus	8 st 12 lb
Source: (P) – boat club president

== Race ==
The Championship Course along which the Boat Race is contested

Oxford won the toss and elected to start from the Middlesex station, handing the Surrey side of the river to Cambridge. Umpire Pitman started the race at 2:36 p.m. in a light breeze which helped create an unusually strong spring tide. Oxford made the better start, with their stroke Bourne out-rating his opposite number by two stroke per minute. At Craven Steps, the Dark Blues were three-quarters of a length ahead which they held past the Mile Post. At this point Oxford pushed on to be clear by the Crab Tree pub and a further length ahead by Harrods Furniture Depository. By the time the crews passed below Hammersmith Bridge, the Dark Blues were two and a half lengths ahead and reduced their rating yet continued to pull away.

By Chiswick Steps, Oxford were four lengths clear and further ahead at Barnes Bridge. Cambridge's determination meant that they reduced the deficit over the last few minutes of the race. Oxford won by two and three-quarter lengths in a time of 18 minutes 29 seconds. It was Oxford's third consecutive victory and took the overall record to 37–30 in their favour. The winning time was the fastest in the history of the race.
