= Rowing at the 1912 Summer Olympics – Men's eight =

Men's eight at the Games of the V Olympiad
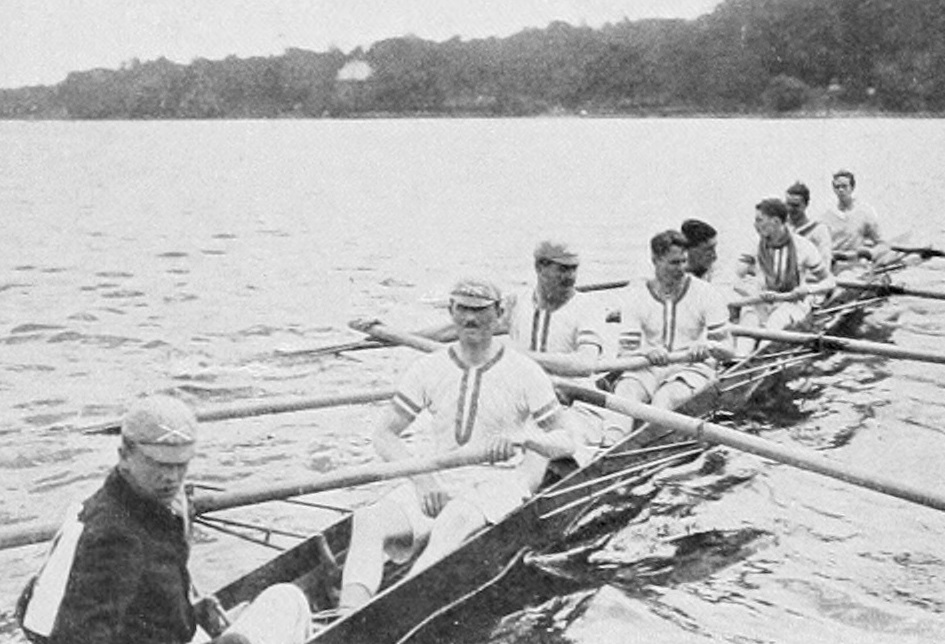
- The winning team of the Leander.
- Venue: Djurgårdsbrunnsviken
- Dates: 17 July 1912 (heats); 18 July 1912 (quarterfinals); 19 July 1912 (semifinals, final)
- Competitors: 99 from 8 nations
- Winning time: 6:15.7

Medalists
1st place, gold medalist(s)		Leander Club; Great Britain
2nd place, silver medalist(s)		New College Boat Club; Great Britain
3rd place, bronze medalist(s)		Berlin; Germany

The men's eight was a rowing event held as part of the Rowing at the 1912 Summer Olympics programme. It was the fourth appearance of the event. The competition was held from Wednesday to Friday, 17 to 19 July 1912. Ninety-nine rowers (11 boats) from eight nations competed. Nations were still permitted to have two boats each in the event.

The event was won by the Leander Club of Great Britain, successfully defending their 1908 Olympic title. Silver also went to Great Britain, with their second boat from New College Boat Club. Germany earned its first medal in the men's eight with a bronze by the Berliner Ruderverein von 1876 (Berlin rowing club of 1876).

According to the records of silver medallists New College, the final featured controversy as Leander's team acted outside convention over a coin toss, though this is not mentioned in the official record.

== Background ==
This was the fourth appearance of the event. Rowing had been on the programme in 1896 but was cancelled due to bad weather. The men's eight has been held every time that rowing has been contested, beginning in 1900.

The defending Olympic champion was the Leander Club of Great Britain. Leander's rowers came primarily from Magdalen College, Oxford. Magdalen had won the Grand Challenge Cup at Henley in 1910 and 1911. The other British boat came from another Oxford college, the New College Boat Club.

Canada was represented for the third time by the Argonaut Rowing Club of Toronto, the silver medalists in 1904 and bronze medalists in 1908. The Argonauts had won the 1911 National Association of Amateur Oarsmen title.

A notable absence was Belgium's Royal Club Nautique de Gand; Belgium had won the 1910 European Rowing Championships and the Gand club had won the 1909 Grand Challenge Cup, as well as having taken silver at the 1908 Olympics. The United States again did not compete.

Australasia and Sweden each made their debut in the event. Canada made its third appearance, most among nations to that point.

=== Starting list ===
The following boats and/or rowing clubs participated:

- Australasia Sydney Rowing Club
- Canada Argonaut Rowing Club
- France Société Nautique de Bayonne
- Germany Berliner Ruderverein von 1876
- Germany Sport Borussia, Berlin
- Great Britain Leander Club
- Great Britain New College Boat Club
- Hungary Hungária Evezős Egylet
- Norway Christiania Roklub
- Sweden Göteborgs Roddklubb
- Sweden Roddklubben af 1912

== Competition format ==
The "eight" event featured nine-person boats, with eight rowers and a coxswain. It was a sweep rowing event, with the rowers each having one oar (and thus each rowing on one side). For the first time, the Olympic course used the now-standard distance of 2000 metres.

The 1912 tournament featured four rounds of one-on-one races; with 11 boats in the competition, there were 5 contested heats and 1 walkover in the first round. The six boats advancing from the first round competed in three quarterfinals. The semifinal round had only one contested race, with the loser receiving bronze; the other semifinal was a walkover. The final determined the gold and silver medals.

== Schedule ==
Date	Time	Round
Wednesday, 17 July 1912	12:00	First round
Thursday, 18 July 1912	15:40	Quarterfinals
Friday, 19 July 1912	11:30; 18:00	Semifinals; Final

== Results ==
=== First round ===
The heats were held on Wednesday, 17 July.

==== Heat 1 ====
The boats kept in company as far as to Stenudden, where the Germans began to show in front, their stroke spurting directly afterwards. The Frenchmen made no response and were soon a length behind. Halfway up the course, however, they showed signs of attempting an answering spurt, but went to pieces – in parts. Their opponents rowed as if they meant to win, and as regards style, muscle and training, were quite superior to the Frenchmen, a fact they displayed still more during the last half of the race. The Germans rowed a stroke varying between 32–38 to the minute. The French, rowing from 40–28 per minute, never seriously threatened their opponents, who won by about four lengths.

— Official Report, pp. 662–63.

Rank	Boat	Nation	Bow	Rowers	Stroke	Coxswain	Time	Notes
1	Sport Borussia	Germany	Carl Eichhorn	Ludwig Weinacht; Richard Friesicke; Andreas Wegener; Fritz Eggebrecht; Heinrich Landrock; Egbert Reimsfeld	Gottfried Gelfort	Otto Charlet	6:45.1	Q
2	Société Nautique de Bayonne	France	Jean Arné	Gabriel St. Laurent; Marius Lejeune; Louis Lafitte; Jean Elichagaray; Joseph Campot; Étienne Lesbats	Pierre Alvarez	François Elichagaray	Unknown	

==== Heat 2 ====
Australia started at 44 for the first half minute, the Swedish keeping to 40. The perfectly trained visitors, who rowed like one man, took the lead after 200 metres and never lost it again. When about half the distance was covered, the Swedish boat showed signs of creeping up the Australians, but the latter increased the pace and passed the boat-huse two clear lengths ahead of their opponents, who showed evident signs of fatigue and were beginning to go pieces. The Australians rowed the whole time at a great pace, with only a slight swing, while the style employed by the Swedes bore greater resemblance to English methods. The home-crew was beaten by more than three lengths.

— Official Report, p. 663

Rank	Boat	Nation	Bow	Rowers	Stroke	Coxswain	Time	Notes
1	Sydney	Australasia	John Ryrie	Simon Fraser; Hugh Ward; Thomas Parker; Henry Hauenstein; Sydney Middleton; Harry Ross-Soden	Roger Fitzhardinge	Robert Waley	6:57.0	Q
2	Göteborgs	Sweden	Birger Amundin	Ragnar Bergstedt; Gustaf Broberg; Simon Ericsson; Ivar Ryberg; Anders Almqvist; Arvid Svendel	Leif Sörvik	Gillis Ahlberg	Unknown	

==== Heat 3 ====
The German crew, which forced Germany's best eight, was in front all the time. The Hungarians rowed at a slower pace than their opponents during the whole of the race; they had a nice recovery but could get no good grip of the water and used the slide incorrectly, pushing it before the body. The Germans, on the other hand, rowed in clean English style, even if they had not the same extraordinarily rapid grip of the water and the swift, easy recovery possessed by their models. The Germans, too, were physically the superior of their opponents, and, before any long time had elapsed, their energetic efforts gave them such a lead that, at the boat-house, more than two lengths separated the boats. All the efforts of the Hungarians were in vain and the Germans won quite easily.

— Official Report, pp. 663–64.

Rank	Boat	Nation	Bow	Rowers	Stroke	Coxswain	Time	Notes
1	Berlin	Germany	Otto Liebing	Max Bröske; Max Vetter; Willi Bartholomae; Fritz Bartholomae; Werner Dehn; Rudolf Reichelt	Hans Matthiae	Kurt Runge	6:57.0	Q
2	Hungária	Hungary	István Szebeny	Artúr Baján; Miltiades Manno; István Jeney; Lajos Gráf; Miklós Szebeny; Antal Szebeny	György Szebeny	Kálmán Vaskó	Unknown	

==== Heat 4 ====
The Norwegian eight, who were considerably heavier and more powerfully built than their English rivals, got away first, and kept the lead for about 150 metres rowing as much as 40 while New College kept to 38 for the first minute. Both crews rowed excellently, with a long swing and a powerful grip of the water, but the recovery of the Norwegians was not so quiet as that of the Englishmen, neither was the finish all that could be desired. These two faults, or rather, the fact that the Norwegian crew had not reached the same degree of perfection as the English, probably had been covered, rowing a quiet effective stroke of about 32 per minute. New won by two lengths.

— Official Report, p. 664.

Rank	Boat	Nation	Bow	Rowers	Stroke	Coxswain	Time	Notes
1	New College Boat Club	Great Britain	William Fison	William Parker; Thomas Gillespie; Beaufort Burdekin; Frederick Pitman; Arthur Wiggins; Charles Littlejohn	Robert Bourne	John Walker	6:42.5	Q
2	Christiania	Norway	Einar Sommerfeldt	Thomas Høie; Harald Herlofson; Olaf Solberg; Gustav Hæhre; Hannibal Fegth; Gunnar Grantz	Otto Krogh	John Bjørnstad	Unknown	

==== Heat 5 ====
The Canadians started at 46, while Leander kept to 40, this falling after a minute first to 38 and then to 36, the representatives of the Maple rowing 40–42 during the whole of the race. The two boats kept side by side for a long time, and the pace, in consequence of the terrific time kept up by Canada, was a most amazing one. At the boat-house, Leander spurted and succeeded in creeping half a length in front, but Canada answered with an immensely long, desperate effort and the issue was doubtful until Djurgård Bridge was passed, when Philip Fleming gathered Leander for a final effort which gave the victory to Great Britain by about half a length. Leander rowed in orthodox English style, with a long swing, quiet, finished recovery, a powerful grip of the water and a stroke that was drawn out to the last inch. Canada relied more on muscle, and the tremendous rate at which they rowed prevented a proper recovery. The crew, although beaten, fought like heroes, and lost after the pluckiest struggle imaginable.

— Official Report, pp. 664–65.

Rank	Boat	Nation	Bow	Rowers	Stroke	Coxswain	Time	Notes
1	Leander Club	Great Britain	Edgar Burgess	Sidney Swann; Leslie Wormald; Ewart Horsfall; James Angus Gillan; Stanley Garton; Alister Kirby	Philip Fleming	Henry Wells	6:22.2	Q
2	Argonaut Rowing Club	Canada	Charles Riddy	Phil Boyd; Albert Kent; William Murphy; Alex Sinclair; Becher Gale; Richard Gregory	Geoffrey Taylor	Winslow McCleary	Unknown	

==== Heat 6 ====
The Swedish boat raced without opponent.

Rank	Boat	Nation	Bow	Rowers	Stroke	Coxswain	Time	Notes
1	Roddklubben af 1912	Sweden	Gustaf Brunkman	Per Mattson; Sebastian Tamm; Ted Wachtmeister; Conrad Brunkman; William Bruhn-Möller; Ture Rosvall	Herman Dahlbäck	Leo Wilkens	7:05.2	Q

=== Quarterfinals ===
All quarterfinals were held on Thursday, 18 July.

==== Quarterfinal 1 ====
Both boats got off beautifully and kept side by side for the first 400 met., the Swedish crew rowing a quicker stroke than New (36 to 32). By degrees, however, Robert Bourne pushed his boat half a length in front and had this lead on reaching the inner curve at the bath-house, where he spurted in order to make use of the advantage afforded by the position, and the Swedish stroke answered too late. The result was, that at Djurgård Bridge Great Britain led by a length and Dahlbäck, when on reaching the inner curve of his side of the course, did begin a spurt, but could not get his men to respond to his efforts. In the finish the Swedes regained a little of their lost ground, but they could not prevent New from winning by a length. It was chiefly Bourne's cleverness that decided the race, the manner in which he gathered his crew for the final burst being simply masterly.

— Official Report, p. 665.

Rank	Boat	Nation	Bow	Rowers	Stroke	Coxswain	Time	Notes
1	New College Boat Club	Great Britain	William Fison	William Parker; Thomas Gillespie; Beaufort Burdekin; Frederick Pitman; Arthur Wiggins; Charles Littlejohn	Robert Bourne	John Walker	6:19.0	Q
2	Roddklubben af 1912	Sweden	Gustaf Brunkman	Per Mattson; Sebastian Tamm; Ted Wachtmeister; Conrad Brunkman; William Bruhn-Möller; Ture Rosvall	Herman Dahlbäck	Leo Wilkens	Unknown	

==== Quarterfinal 2 ====
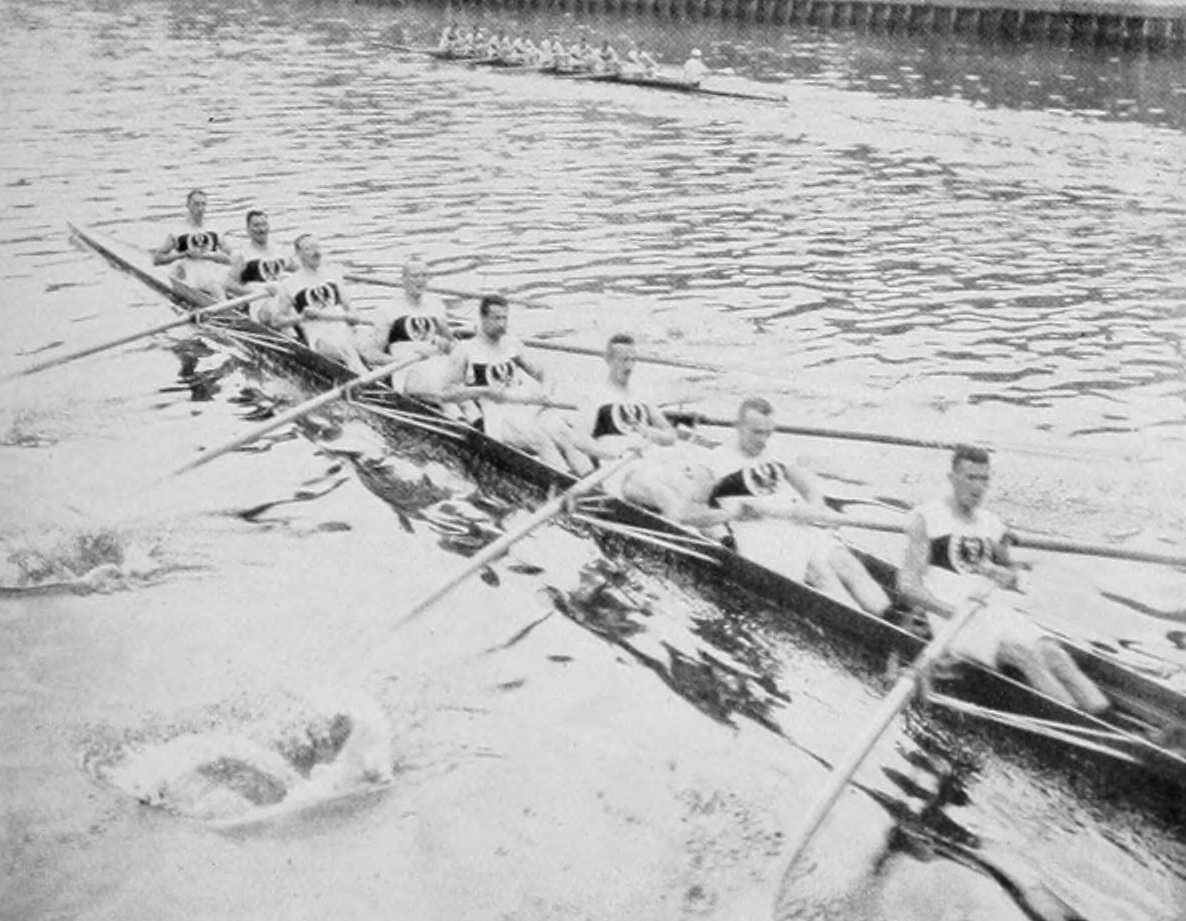
Sport Borussia with the winning Berlin in the background.

[Berlin] rowed in brilliant style with a long stroke, a fine swing and powerful grip of the water, followed by a quiet recovery. The other crew showed the same good qualities but not to an equal degree, and Berlin, which was leading by a length at the halfway, won by nearly two and a half lengths.

— Official Report, p. 665.

Rank	Boat	Nation	Bow	Rowers	Stroke	Coxswain	Time	Notes
1	Berlin	Germany	Otto Liebing	Max Bröske; Max Vetter; Willi Bartholomae; Fritz Bartholomae; Werner Dehn; Rudolf Reichelt	Hans Matthiae	Kurt Runge	6:22.2	Q
2	Sport Borussia	Germany	Carl Eichhorn	Ludwig Weinacht; Richard Friesicke; Andreas Wegener; Fritz Eggebrecht; Heinrich Landrock; Egbert Reimsfeld	Gottfried Gelfort	Otto Charlet	Unknown	

==== Quarterfinal 3 ====
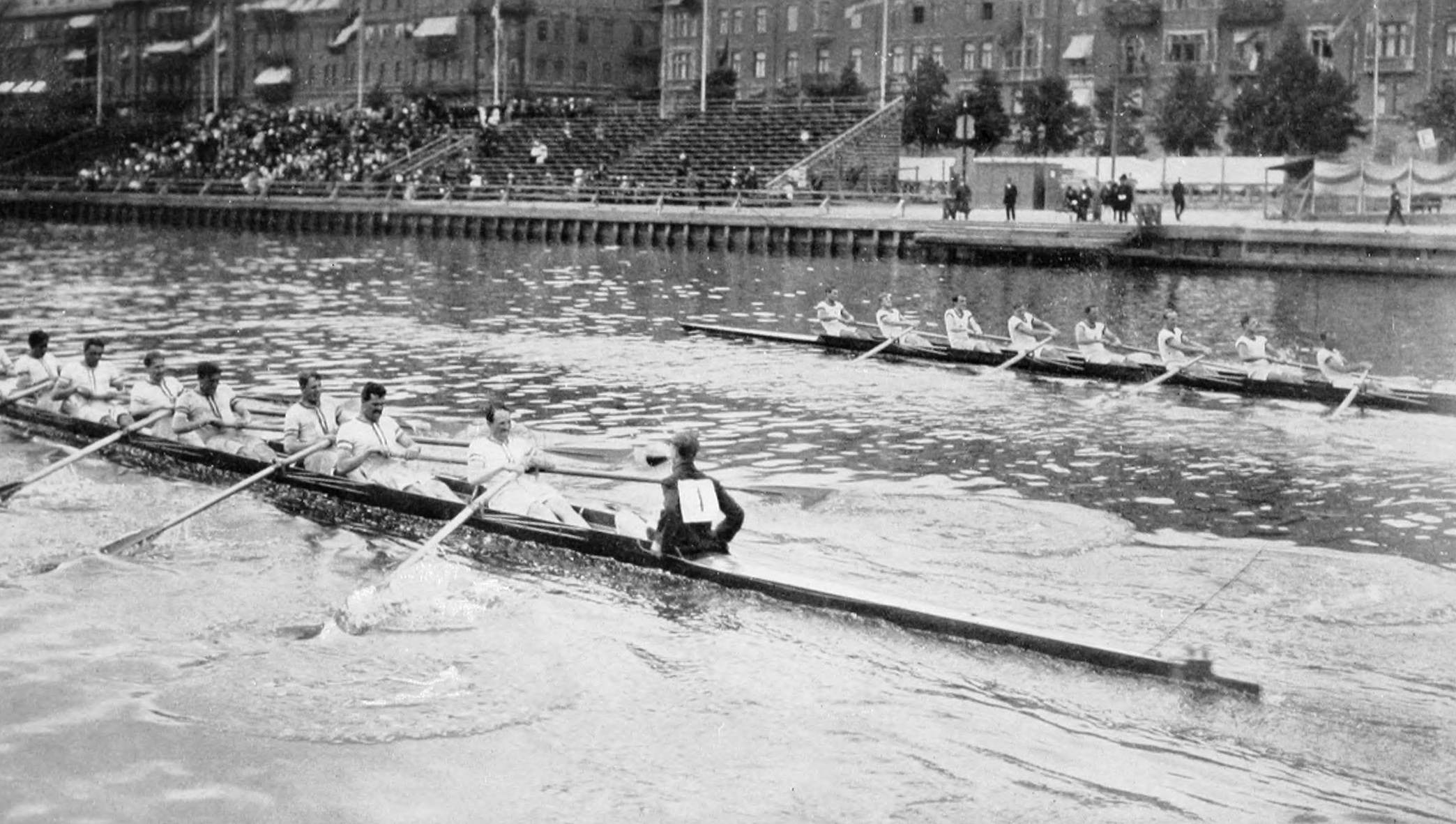
Leander Club (on the left) beating the Sydney Rowing Club

Both crews started very well, Australia retaining its speed of about 40 for the whole of the race, while Leander was content with 36-34, the figures sometimes falling to 32. Australia put all its weight into its stroke and led by a half length at the 1,000 metres mark. The time for half distance was 3:02; these figures showing the speed at which the boats were moving. At the boat-house Australia led and took the inner curve a clear length ahead. At this point, however, Fleming began a terrific spurt, which resulted in his opponents' lead being diminished at the bridge to only half a length. The Australian eight now began to row somewhat raggedly and showed other signs of fatigue; Leander, on the contrary, beginning another magnificent spurt which lasted until the winning post was passed. Fitzhardinge was not sufficiently supported by his men, so that the half length by which Australia led at the bridge was snatched out of its hands. The two boats lay side by side 100 metres from the finish, but Leander stayed better, and the English style allowed of more being got out of the spurt, so that the British boat won by about three metres.

— Official Report, pp. 665–66.

Rank	Boat	Nation	Bow	Rowers	Stroke	Coxswain	Time	Notes
1	Leander Club	Great Britain	Edgar Burgess	Sidney Swann; Leslie Wormald; Ewart Horsfall; James Angus Gillan; Stanley Garton; Alister Kirby	Philip Fleming	Henry Wells	6:10.2	Q
2	Sydney	Australasia	John Ryrie	Simon Fraser; Hugh Ward; Thomas Parker; Henry Hauenstein; Sydney Middleton; Harry Ross-Soden	Roger Fitzhardinge	Robert Waley	Unknown	

=== Semifinals ===
Both semifinals were held on Friday, 19 July.

==== Semifinal 1 ====
The New College team raced without opponent, but "gave the spectators a good opportunity of seeing the pure English style of rowing, with its firm grip of the water and the quiet, almost stealthy recovery."

Rank	Boat	Nation	Bow	Rowers	Stroke	Coxswain	Time	Notes
1	New College Boat Club	Great Britain	William Fison	William Parker; Thomas Gillespie; Beaufort Burdekin; Frederick Pitman; Arthur Wiggins; Charles Littlejohn	Robert Bourne	John Walker	7:47.0	Q

==== Semifinal 2 ====
At the very start, Leander managed to get a couple of metres' lead, but the German crew soon recovered itself, and at the 500 met. mark was leading by about half a length. As seen from the shore, the English eight seemed to take the race very quietly, rowing scarcely more than 34 to their opponents' 38, and at the 1,000 metres mark the Germans were leading by nearly a length. ... Just before reaching the boat-house, Leander, which had the outside curve, spurted and managed to pick up about half a length, while the Germans ... committed the fault of not making use of the advantage given by the possession of the inner curve, and making an extra exertion which have certainly increased the distance between them and the English crew, or, in any case, would have kept them at their previous distance in the rear. Fleming put his men to a severe test from the bath-house to the bridge, and the determination and speed by means of which Leander drew level with their opponents after one minute's rapid spurt, were simply unique. The German crew was not rowed out, however, and a desperate struggle took place all the way from the bridge to the finish, the result being that Leander won by about half a length ... .|Official Report, pp. 666–67.}}

Rank	Boat	Nation	Bow	Rowers	Stroke	Coxswain	Time	Notes
1	Leander Club	Great Britain	Edgar Burgess	Sidney Swann; Leslie Wormald; Ewart Horsfall; James Angus Gillan; Stanley Garton; Alister Kirby	Philip Fleming	Henry Wells	6:16.2	Q
3rd place, bronze medalist(s)	Berlin	Germany	Otto Liebing	Max Bröske; Max Vetter; Willi Bartholomae; Fritz Bartholomae; Werner Dehn; Rudolf Reichelt	Hans Matthiae	Kurt Runge	6:18.6	

=== Final ===
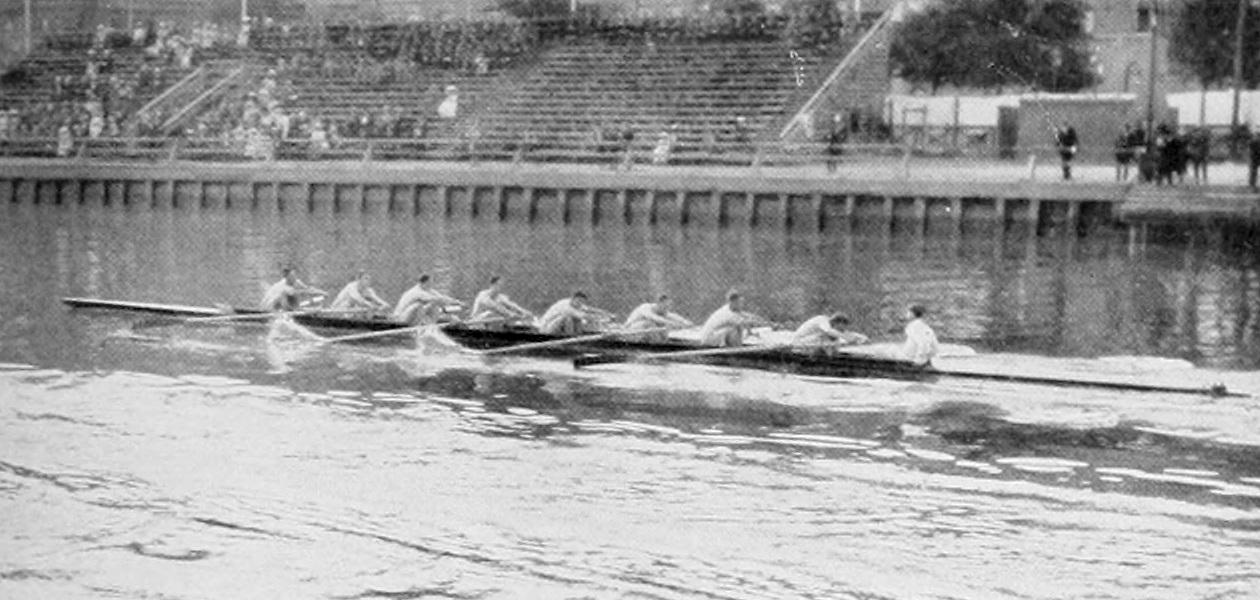
The silver medal winning New College with the wash of the gold medal winning Leander in the foreground.

The final was held on Friday, 19 July, between the two British teams, from the Leander Club and from New College, Oxford.

According to New College records, the race featured controversy, over a coin toss for choice of lanes. (The official rules required that the lanes be chosen by drawing lots.) The two lanes of the Djurgårdsbrunnsviken course were said to be markedly different, with a clearly better lane. According to New College tradition, lanes were chosen by coin toss, but the winner of the coin toss would offer the choice to the other boat, which would politely decline; yet when New College won the toss, Leander did not decline but instead chose the better lane. When Leander won the final, New College stroke Robert Bourne, angry over the choice, supposedly said "God damn bloody Magdalen" (referring to the Oxford college from which most of the Leander team hailed). At the medal ceremony, King Gustaf V is said to have presented his colors to New College (though the gold medals and Challenge Trophy went to Leander); the New College Boat Club has since used the supposed Swedish Royal House colors of purple and gold. New College has also taken "God damn bloody Magdalen" as a toast and put the abbreviation "GDBM" on its letterhead.

The official record makes no mention of any controversy, reading simply:

The two boats rowed side by side until the 1,000 metres mark was passed, when Leander spurted in order to neutralize Bourne's efforts at the bath-house, where New had the inner curve. Then Fleming pressed his men from the bath-house to the bridge, so that Leander led by a clear length at the latter place, all Bourne's efforts being unable to prevent New from falling behind. Leander won by about a length in the good time of 6.15.

— Official Report, p. 667.

Rank	Boat	Nation	Bow	Rowers	Stroke	Coxswain	Time
1st place, gold medalist(s)	Leander Club	Great Britain	Edgar Burgess	Sidney Swann; Leslie Wormald; Ewart Horsfall; James Angus Gillan; Stanley Garton; Alister Kirby	Philip Fleming	Henry Wells	6:15.7
2nd place, silver medalist(s)	New College Boat Club	Great Britain	William Fison	William Parker; Thomas Gillespie; Beaufort Burdekin; Frederick Pitman; Arthur Wiggins; Charles Littlejohn	Robert Bourne	John Walker	6:19.2

== Sources ==
- Bergvall, Erik, ed. (1913). The Official Report of the Olympic Games of Stockholm 1912. Translated by Adams-Ray, Edward. Stockholm: Wahlström & Widstrand.
- Wudarski, Pawel (1999). "Wyniki Igrzysk Olimpijskich" (in Polish).
