= The Boat Race 1914 =

71st Boat Race
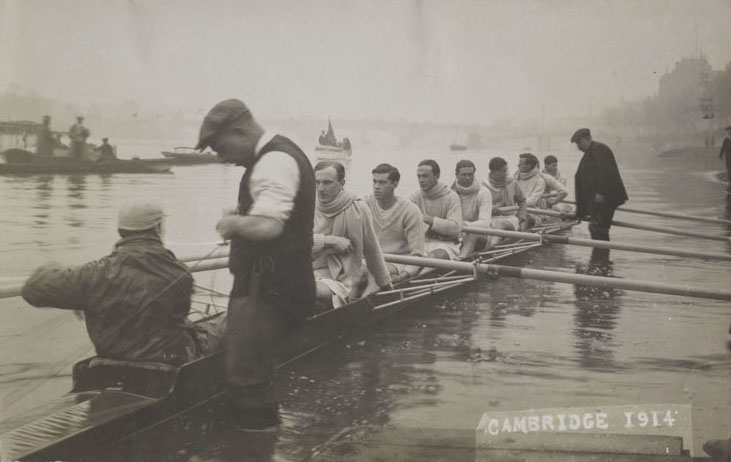
- The 1914 Cambridge Boat Race crew
- Date: 28 March 1914
- Winner: Cambridge
- Margin of victory: 4 1/2 lengths
- Winning time: 20 minutes 23 seconds
- Overall record (Cambridge–Oxford): 31–39
- Umpire: Frederick I. Pitman (Cambridge)

The 71st Boat Race took place on 28 March 1914. Held annually, the Boat Race is a side-by-side rowing race between crews from the Universities of Oxford and Cambridge along the River Thames. Oxford went into the race as reigning champions, having won the previous year's race. In this year's race, umpired by former rower Frederick I. Pitman, Cambridge won by 4 1/2 lengths in a time of 20 minutes 23 seconds. The victory took the overall record to 39–31 in Oxford's favour. It would be the last race for six years following the outbreak of the First World War.

== Background ==
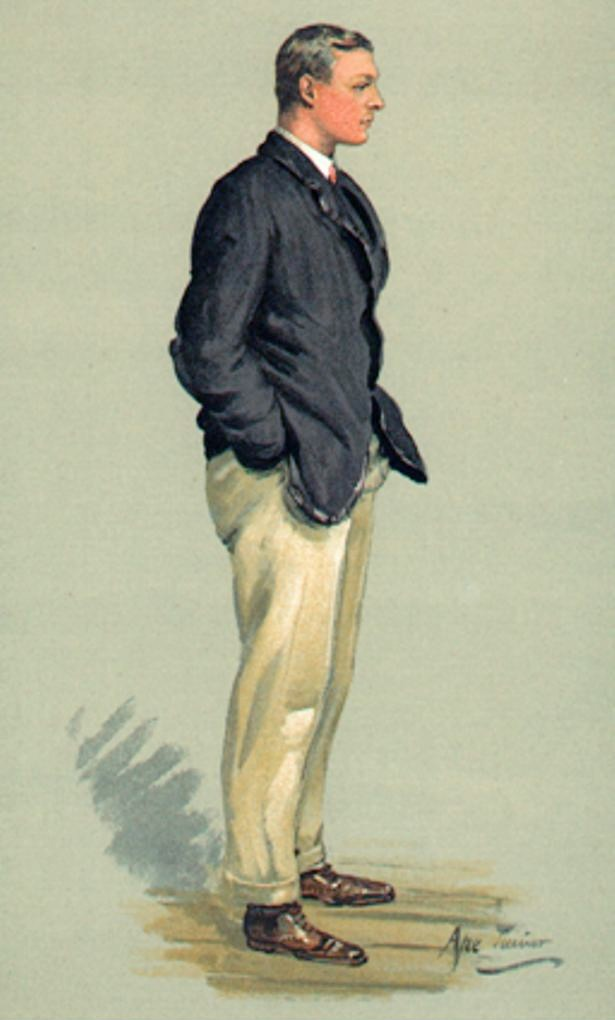
Robert Bourne coached Oxford.

The Boat Race is a side-by-side rowing competition between the University of Oxford (sometimes referred to as the "Dark Blues") and the University of Cambridge (sometimes referred to as the "Light Blues"). The race was first held in 1829, and since 1845 has taken place on the 4.2-mile (6.8 km) Championship Course on the River Thames in southwest London. The rivalry is a major point of honour between the two universities; it is followed throughout the United Kingdom and, as of 2015, broadcast worldwide. Oxford went into the race as reigning champions, having won the 1913 race by three-quarters of a length, and led overall with 39 victories to Cambridge's 30 (excluding the "dead heat" of 1877).

Oxford's coaches were G. C. Bourne who had rowed for the university in the 1882 and 1883 races, his son Robert Bourne (who rowed four times from 1909 to 1912), and Harcourt Gilbey Gold (Dark Blue president for the 1900 race and four-time Blue). Cambridge were coached by Stanley Bruce (who had rowed in the 1904 race). For the eleventh year the umpire was old Etonian Frederick I. Pitman who rowed for Cambridge in the 1884, 1885 and 1886 races.

According to author and former Oxford rower George Drinkwater, the Cambridge crew "rapidly developed into a crew which gave every promise of being quite sensationally fast." Conversely, he noted that Oxford suffered "from a dearth of material" which, followed by constant changes in the crew order, resulted in a "merely eight good men in a boat — and nothing more".

== Crews ==
The Cambridge crew weighed an average of 12 st 9.25 lb (80.2 kg), 3.25 pounds (1.5 kg) per rower more than their opponents. The Oxford crew saw five participants return, including cox Henry Wells who was taking part in his fourth race. Cambridge's crew also included five participants with Boat Race experience, including Sidney Swann who was making his fourth appearance in the event. Swann and Ewart Horsfall had both won gold medals in the men's eight at the 1912 Summer Olympics, rowing for Leander Club. They defeated New College in the final for whom Arthur Wiggins, Beaufort Burdekin and Frederick Pitman rowed.

Seat	Oxford			Cambridge		
Seat	Name	College	Weight	Name	College	Weight
Bow	R. W. Fletcher	Balliol	11 st 10.5 lb	D. I. Day	Lady Margaret Boat Club	11 st 6 lb
2	B. Burdekin	New College	12 st 4 lb	S. E. Swann (P)	Trinity Hall	11 st 13 lb
3	H. K. Ward	New College	12 st 9 lb	P. C. Livingstone	Sidney Sussex	13 st 7 lb
4	E. D. Horsfall	Magdalen	12 st 7.5 lb	J. A. Ritson	1st Trinity	13 st 7 lb
5	J. B. Kindersley	Exeter	12 st 9.5 lb	K. G. Garnett	1st Trinity	13 st 12 lb
6	A. F. R. Wiggins (P)	New College	12 st 13 lb	C. S. Clark	Pembroke	13 st 1 lb
7	G. W. Titherington	Queen's	12 st 10 lb	C. E. V. Buxton	3rd Trinity	12 st 2.5 lb
Stroke	F. A. H. Pitman	New College	12 st 6 lb	G. E. Tower	3rd Trinity	11 st 12 lb
Cox	H. B. Wells	Magdalen	8 st 8 lb	L. E. Ridley	Jesus	8 st 7 lb
Source: (P) – boat club president

== Race ==
The Championship Course along which the Boat Race is contested

Cambridge won the toss and elected to start from the Surrey station, handing the Middlesex side of the river to Oxford. In bright sunshine, a light wind and smooth water, umpire Pitman started the race at 2:20 p.m. Although rating slower than Oxford, Cambridge took a lead and were three-quarters of a length ahead by Craven Steps. They extended their lead to a length and a quarter by the Mile Post and continued to pull away as they passed below Hammersmith Bridge. According to Drinkwater, they took "things easy in the rough water" towards Barnes Bridge and went on to pass the finishing post four and a half lengths ahead, in a time of 20 minutes 23 seconds. It was Cambridge's first victory since the 1908 race and took the overall record in the event to 39–31 in Oxford's favour. Drinkwater concluded that while "Oxford were a poor crew ... individually they had quite a lot of talent". By comparison, he noted that Cambridge "were a reasonably high-class crew ... but they lacked quickness".

It was the last race until 1920, as a result of the outbreak of the First World War, and first time since 1853 that there was a break in the annual tradition. During the conflict, at least 42 Blues were killed, including five of the 1914 participants: Dennis Ivor Day, cox L. E. Ridley, John Andrew Ritson and Gordon Garnett of the Cambridge crew, and Reginald William Fletcher from the Oxford boat.
