= Roger Fitzhardinge =

Australian rower

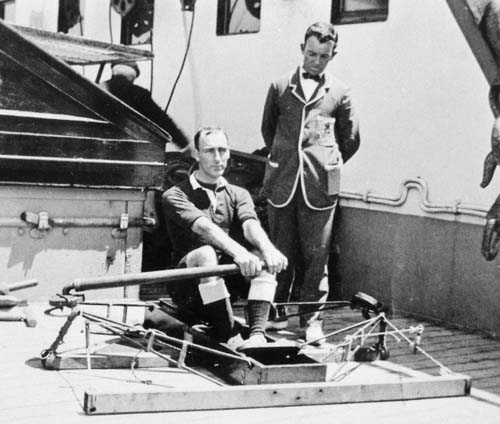

Personal information
- Nationality: Australian
- Born: 23 March 1879 Balmain, New South Wales, Australia
- Died: 9 January 1965 (aged 85) Bowral, Australia

Sport
- Sport: Rowing
- Club: Sydney Rowing Club

Achievements and titles
- National finals: Interstate M8+ 1903,04,08,11

Roger Berkeley Fitzhardinge (23 March 1879 – 9 January 1965) was an Australian rower. He was a dual Australian champion who stroked an Australian crew which won the Grand Challenge Cup at the Henley Royal Regatta in 1912 and the Australian men's eight at the 1912 Summer Olympics.

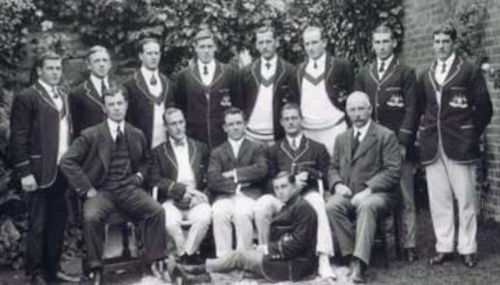
Fitzhardinge (seated 2nd from left) with the 1912 Aust Olympic VIII, incl reserves & selectors

== Club and state rowing ==
Fitzhardinge competed for the Sydney Rowing Club and later served a term as the club's vice-president.

He was selected to stroke New South Wales eights which contested the Australian interstate men's eight events at the Interstate Regattas in 1903, 1904, 1908 and 1911. Those New South Wales crews with Fitzhardinge at stroke were victorious in 1908 and 1911. For the three years from 1909 to 1911 he was the selector of the New South Wales men's eight.

In 1913 and 1923 he was New South Wales state selector. In 1932 he was an Assistant coach of the St Joseph's College Hunters Hill first VIII in their victory in that year's GPS Head of the River.

== International representative rowing ==
An Australian eight was selected in 1912 to compete at the Henley Royal Regatta and the Stockholm Olympics. It was a co-operative venture between the NSW and the Victorian Rowing Associations, there being no Australian governing body at the time. Much of the funding for the trip came from the Victorian Rowing Association and the families of the two Victorian crew members Simon Fraser and Harry Ross-Soden.

The Australian eight needed to nominate at Henley as a club entrant and raced as the Sydney Rowing Club from which five of the crew and coxswain were drawn. Fraser, Ross-Soden and the Leichhardt man Henry Hauenstein joined the Sydney Club to legitimise the entry. Fitzhardinge was the stroke at Henley when the eight progressed through their match races and beat the Leander Club in the final to take the 1912 Grand Challenge Cup. Onto Sweden for the 1912 Summer Olympics and with Keith Heritage changed out for the UK resident Australian Hugh Ward, Fitzhardinge again stroked the Australian eight. They beat a Swedish crew in the first round then in the quarter-final they were knocked-out by same Leander eight they'd triumphed over at Henley.
