= Pud =

Pud may refer to:

- The radio station WPDH in Poughkeepsie, New York (The PUD)
- Pudding, a typically sweet food
- Comic strip mascot for Dubble Bubble
- A nickname of Albert Kent, a Canadian football coach and olympic rower
- A nickname of Philip Kaplan, an American entrepreneur
- Pud Galvin, a Hall of Fame Major League Baseball pitcher
- Pood or pud, an old Russian unit of weight
- Slang, shortened version of "pudendum"
- Conversely, slang for penis

PUD can be an acronym for

- Planned unit development
- Public utility district, a consumer co-op owned utility
- Peptic ulcer disease
