= The Boat Race 1910 =

67th Boat Race
- Date: 23 March 1910
- Winner: Oxford
- Margin of victory: 3 1/2 lengths
- Winning time: 20 minutes 14 seconds
- Overall record (Cambridge–Oxford): 30–36
- Umpire: Frederick I. Pitman (Cambridge)

The 67th Boat Race took place on 23 March 1910. Held annually, the Boat Race is a side-by-side rowing race between crews from the Universities of Oxford and Cambridge along the River Thames. Oxford were reigning champions, having won the previous year's race. In a race umpired by Frederick I. Pitman, Oxford won by 3 1/2 lengths in a time of 20 minutes 14 seconds, taking their overall lead in the competition to 36–30.

== Background ==
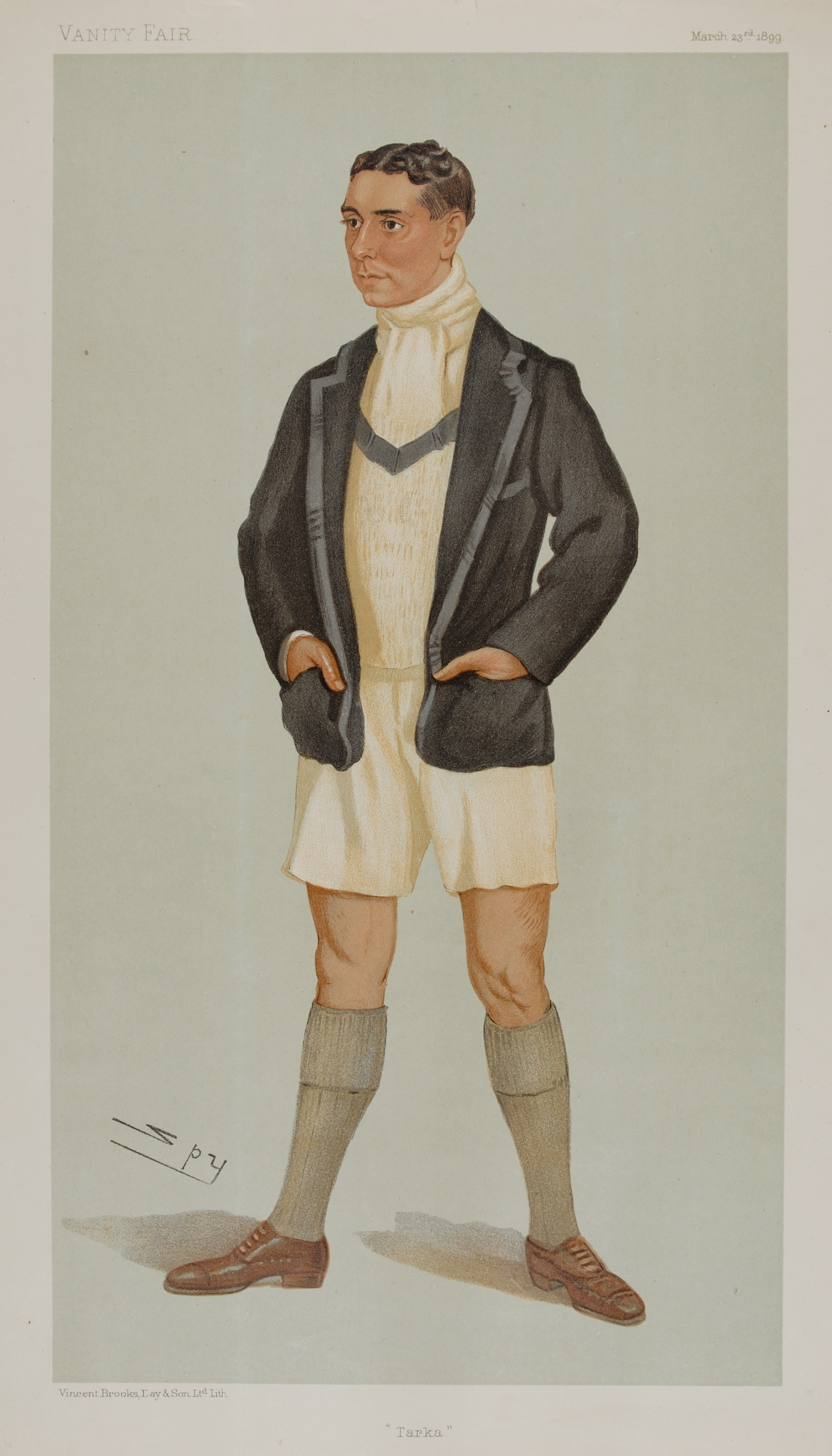
Harcourt Gilbey Gold, the previous president of the Oxford University Boat Club, coached the Dark Blues for the 1910 race.

The Boat Race is a side-by-side rowing competition between the University of Oxford (sometimes referred to as the "Dark Blues") and the University of Cambridge (sometimes referred to as the "Light Blues"). The race was first held in 1829, and since 1845 has taken place on the 4.2-mile (6.8 km) Championship Course on the River Thames in southwest London. The rivalry is a major point of honour between the two universities; it is followed throughout the United Kingdom and, as of 2015, broadcast worldwide. Oxford went into the race as reigning champions, having won the 1909 race by 3 1/2 lengths, and led overall with 35 victories to Cambridge's 30 (excluding the "dead heat" of 1877).

Oxford's coaches were G. C. Bourne who had rowed for the university in the 1882 and 1883 races, Harcourt Gilbey Gold (Dark Blue president for the 1900 race and four-time Blue) and W. F. C. Holland who had rowed for Oxford four times between 1887 and 1890. Cambridge were coached by William Dudley Ward (who had rowed in 1897, 1899 and 1900 races), Raymond Etherington-Smith (who had rowed in 1898 and 1900) and David Alexander Wauchope (who had rowed in the 1895 race). For the seventh year the umpire was old Etonian Frederick I. Pitman who rowed for Cambridge in the 1884, 1885 and 1886 races.

According to author and former Oxford rower George Drinkwater, the Dark Blues "did not have any very promising new material from which to make up [their] crew" but was impressed by a "very stylish" Philip Fleming who had been included as Oxford's number seven. Cambridge's coaches worked to re-introduce a more traditional style of rowing but like Oxford, "their material was not very good". Although they lost Eric Fairbairn late in the build-up to the race, Drinkwater considered them to be "a pretty, lively crew to look at". As a result of unfavourable tides, the race was scheduled to be held on the Wednesday of Holy Week which, according to Drinkwater, "caused considerable controversy".

== Crews ==
The Oxford crew weighed an average of 12 st 8.875 lb (80.0 kg), 4.375 pounds (2.0 kg) per rower more than their opponents. Cambridge's boat contained three rowers with Boat Race experience, including R. W. M. Arbuthnot, J. B. Rosher and Edward Williams, the latter making his third consecutive appearance in the event, having won a bronze medal in the men's eight in the 1908 Summer Olympics. Oxford saw four crew members return, including Duncan Mackinnon, Stanley Garton, Robert Bourne and cox A. W. F. Donkin. Three participants in the race were registered as overseas Blues: Oxford's bow M. B. Higgins and Cambridge's number four C. P. Cooke were Australian while Light Blue cox C. A. Skinner was from South Africa.

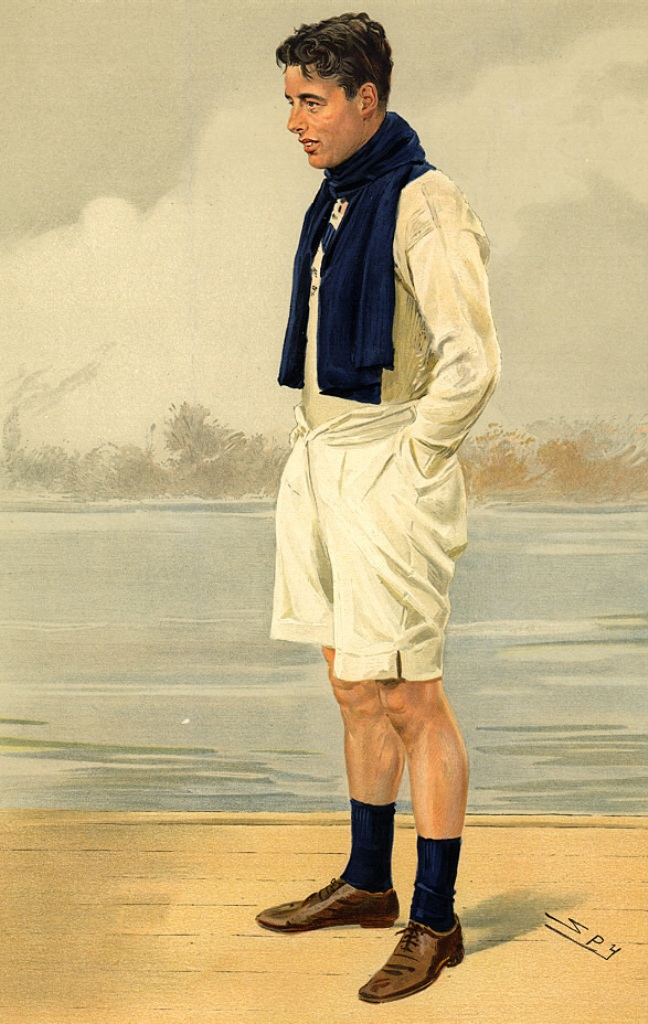
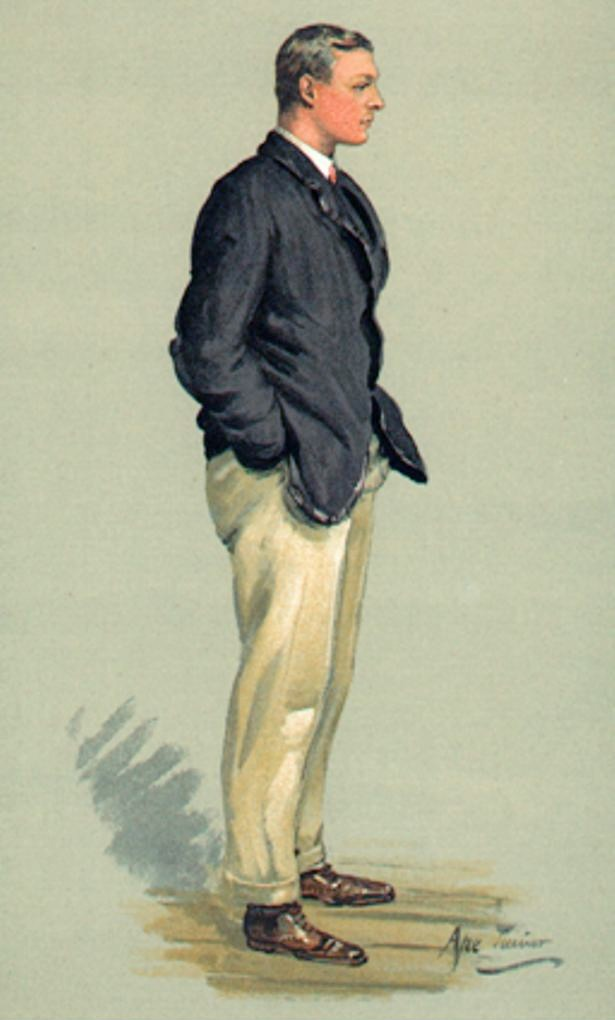
Duncan Mackinnon (left) rowed at number five for Oxford while Robert Bourne stroked the Oxford boat.

Seat	Oxford			Cambridge		
Seat	Name	College	Weight	Name	College	Weight
Bow	M. B. Higgins	Balliol	11 st 8 lb	R. W. M. Arbuthnot	3rd Trinity	10 st 5 lb
2	R. H. Owen	Wadham	12 st 6.5 lb	R. Davies	St Catharine's	11 st 11.5 lb
3	N. Field	Brasenose	13 st 8.5 lb	F. E. Hellyer	1st Trinity	12 st 3.5 lb
4	E. Majolier	Christ Church	13 st 0.5 lb	C. P. Cooke	Trinity Hall	12 st 9.5 lb
5	D. Mackinnon (P)	Magdalen	13 st 2.5 lb	E. G. Williams (P)	3rd Trinity	13 st 2.5 lb
6	A. S. Garton	Magdalen	13 st 11 lb	J. B. Rosher	1st Trinity	14 st 4 lb
7	P. Fleming	Magdalen	12 st 6 lb	C. R. le Blanc Smith	3rd Trinity	12 st 6.5 lb
Stroke	R. C. Bourne	New	11 st 0 lb	H. J. S. Shields	Jesus	11 st 5.5 lb
Cox	A. W. F. Donkin	Magdalen	8 st 8 lb	C. A. Skinner	Jesus	8 st 5 lb
Source: (P) – boat club president

== Race ==
The Championship Course along which the Boat Race is contested

Cambridge won the toss and elected to start from the Middlesex station, handing the Surrey side of the river to Oxford. In bright sunshine and a light breeze, umpire Pitman started the race at 12:30 p.m. Cambridge made the better start and led Oxford until one of the Light Blues "caught a crab", allowing the Dark Blues to take the lead. Even with a slower stroke rate, Oxford were a quarter of a length ahead by Craven Steps but the lead was short-lived as Cambridge spurted to lead by the Mile Post. Unable to make further gains, the Light Blues began to lose ground around the unfavourable bend in the river, with Oxford spurting and gaining almost one length in ten strokes.

At The Doves pub, another spurt saw Oxford go one length clear, which they gradually extended along the rest of the course to win by three and a half lengths in a time of 20 minutes 14 seconds, the slowest winning time since the 1907 race. It was their second consecutive victory and took the overall record in the event to 36–30 in their favour.
