= Høie =

Høie is a surname of Norwegian origin. Notable people with the surname include:

- Bent Høie (born 1971), Norwegian politician
- Gudrun Høie (born 1970), Norwegian sport wrestler
- Kenneth Høie (born 1979), Norwegian footballer
- Othelie Høie, Norwegian swimmer
- Thomas Høie (1883–1948), Norwegian rower
