= Bergstedt (surname) =

Bergstedt is a surname. Notable people with the surname include:

- Hannah Bergstedt (born 1977), Swedish politician
- Harald Bergstedt (1877–1965), Danish writer, novelist, playwright, and poet
- John Bergstedt (born 1969), Swedish ski mountaineer
- Jonas Bergstedt (born 1991), Danish basketball player
- Ragnar Bergstedt (1889–1987), Swedish rower
