= Jean Elichagaray =

French rower

Jean Baptiste Pierre Eugène Elichagaray (3 September 1886 – 8 June 1987) was a French rower who competed in the men's eight event at the 1912 Summer Olympics in Stockholm. A member of the Société Nautique de Bayonne, he was eliminated in the opening heats alongside Jean Arné, Gabriel St. Laurent, Marius Lejeune, Louis Lafitte, Joseph Campot, Étienne Lesbats, Pierre Alvarez, and François Elichagaray. He was born and died in Bayonne, France.

== See also ==
- List of centenarians (sportspeople)
