= Rudolf Reichelt =

German rower (1890–1971)

Olympic medal record

Men's rowing
Bronze medal – third place	1912 Stockholm	Men's eight

Rudolf Reichelt (24 March 1890 – 26 November 1971) was a German rower who competed for the German Empire in the 1912 Summer Olympics. The German team won the bronze medal in the eight.

== 1912 German Men's eights rowing team ==
- Otto Liebing
- Max Bröske
- Fritz Bartholomae
- Willi Bartholomae
- Werner Dehn
- Rudolf Reichelt
- Hans Matthiae
- Kurt Runge
- Max Vetter
