= Arvid Svendel =

Swedish rower

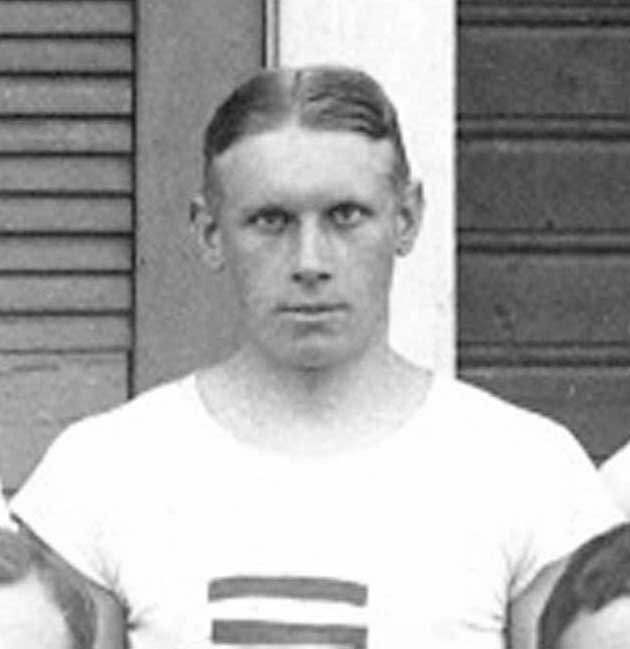

Personal information
- Born: 13 January 1888 Nor, Karlstad, Sweden
- Died: 23 August 1962 (aged 74) Stockholm, Sweden

Sport
- Sport: Rowing
- Club: Göteborgs RK

Knut Arvid Swendel (13 January 1888 – 23 August 1962) was a Swedish rower who competed in the 1912 Summer Olympics. He was a crew member of the Swedish boat Göteborgs that was eliminated in the first round of the men's eight tournament.
