= Simon Ericsson =

Swedish rower

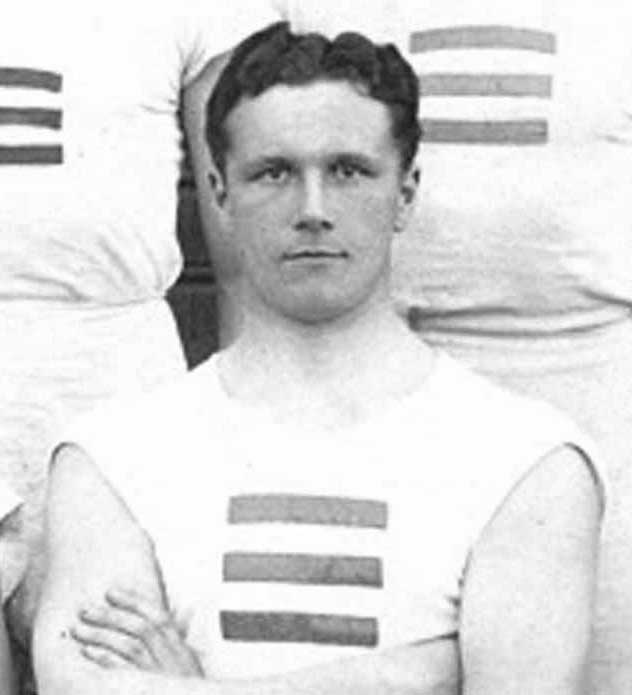

Personal information
- Born: 27 November 1886 Rackeby, Lidköping, Sweden
- Died: 28 May 1966 (aged 79) Gothenburg, Sweden

Sport
- Sport: Rowing
- Club: Göteborgs RK

Simon Augustinus Ericsson (27 November 1886 – 28 May 1966) was a Swedish rower who competed in the 1912 Summer Olympics. He was a crew member of the Swedish boat "Göteborgs" that was eliminated in the first round of the men's eight tournament.
