= Artúr Baján =

Hungarian rower

Personal information
- Nationality: Hungarian
- Born: 4 April 1888 Nova Gradiška, Austria-Hungary
- Died: 12 November 1969 (aged 81) Estoril, Portugal

Sport
- Sport: Rowing

Artúr Baján (4 April 1888 – 12 November 1969) was a Hungarian rower and skier. He competed in the men's eight event at the 1912 Summer Olympics. A founding member of the Hungarian Ski Association, he was a two-time national champion in skiing. He later was an honorary consul in Lisbon, Portugal.
