= Gillis Ahlberg =

Swedish coxswain

Gillis Ferdinand Ahlberg (8 November 1892 – 6 November 1930) was a Swedish rowing coxswain who competed in the 1912 Summer Olympics.

He coxed the Swedish boat Göteborgs which was eliminated in the first round of the men's eights tournament.
