= Max Vetter =

German rower

Personal information
- Born: 17 March 1892 Stuhm, Russian Empire
- Died: 1917 (aged 24–25)

Sport
- Sport: Rowing
- Club: BRC, Berlin
Medal record
Men's rowing
Representing Germany
Olympic Games
Bronze medal – third place	1912 Stockholm	Eight
European Rowing Championships
Gold medal – first place	1913 Ghent	Eight

Max Vetter (17 March 1892 – 1917) was a German rower who competed for the German Empire in the 1912 Summer Olympics. The German team won the bronze medal in the men's eight. Team members were Otto Liebing, Max Bröske, Fritz Bartholomae, Willi Bartholomae, Werner Dehn, Rudolf Reichelt, Hans Matthiae, and Kurt Runge.
