= John Walker (rowing) =

British rower

Olympic medal record

Men's rowing
Silver medal – second place	1912 Stockholm	Eight

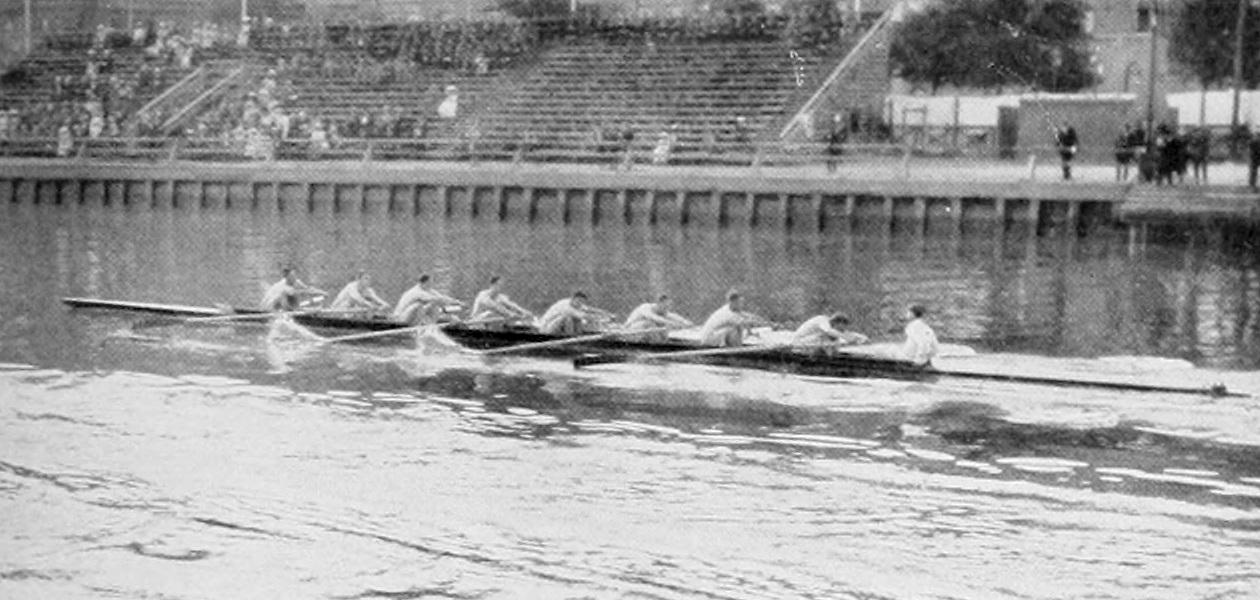
The British eights of the New College in the final of the 1912 Summer Olympics with the wash of the winning Leander in the foreground.

John Drummond Walker (4 January 1891 – 22 July 1952) was a British rowing coxswain who competed in the 1912 Summer Olympics.

Walker was born in Oxford, the son of Rev. Edward Newburn Walker, senior tutor of The Queen's College, Oxford, and his wife Gertrude May Hamilton. He was educated at New College, Oxford.

Walker was the coxswain of the New College eight which won the silver medal for Great Britain rowing at the 1912 Summer Olympics.

In 1918, Walker was in the Naval Sea Transport Branch, Ministry of Shipping, when he was awarded the MBE.
