= Alex Sinclair (rower) =

Canadian rower

Personal information
- Born: 27 July 1882; Fort Erie, Ontario, Canada
- Died: 12 July 1969 (aged 86); Deep River, Ontario, Canada

Sport
- Sport: Rowing

Alex Sinclair (27 July 1882 – 12 July 1969) was a Canadian rower. He competed in the men's eight event at the 1912 Summer Olympics.
