= Einar Sommerfeldt =

Norwegian rower

Personal information
- Born: 16 July 1889; Kristiania, Norway
- Died: 29 April 1976 (aged 86)

Sport
- Sport: Rowing

Einar Sommerfeldt (16 July 1889 – 29 April 1976) was a Norwegian rower. He was born in Kristiania, and competed for Christiania Roklub. He competed in the men's eight at the 1912 Summer Olympics in Stockholm.
