= William Murphy (rower) =

Canadian rower

Personal information
- Full name: William Ewart Gladstone Murphy
- Born: 9 February 1889; Kingston, Ontario, Canada
- Died: 18 February 1916 (aged 27); Toronto, Ontario, Canada

Sport
- Sport: Rowing

William Murphy (9 February 1889 – 18 February 1916) was a Canadian rower. He competed in the men's eight event at the 1912 Summer Olympics. He died following an injury sustained in a rugby match.
