= Lajos Gráf =

Hungarian rower

Personal information
- Nationality: Hungarian
- Born: 28 May 1893 Budapest, Austria-Hungary
- Died: 11 February 1949 (aged 55) Budapest, Hungary

Sport
- Sport: Rowing

Lajos Gráf (28 May 1893 – 11 February 1949) was a Hungarian rower. He competed in the men's eight event at the 1912 Summer Olympics. The "Hungarian Eight" ended up seventh.

His brother, Frigyes Gráf was an Olympic gymnast.

Gráf killed himself in 1949.
