= Gustaf Brunkman =

Swedish rower

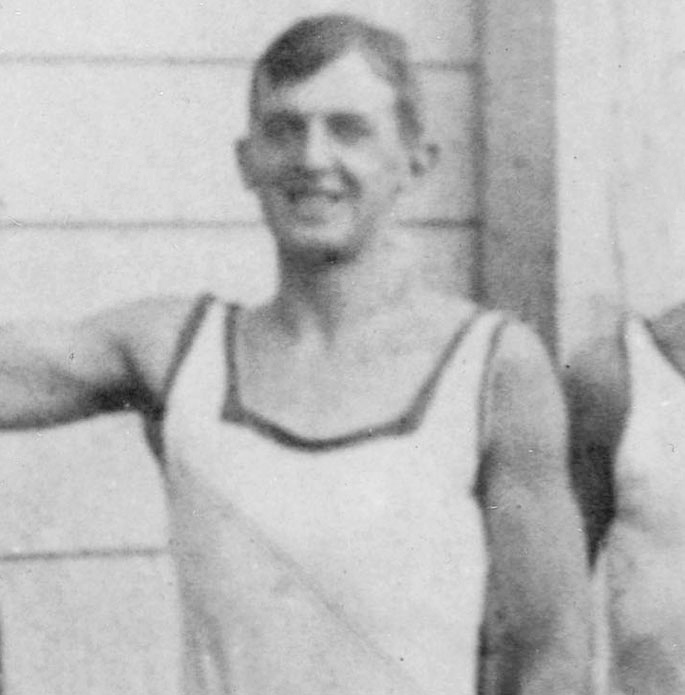

Personal information
- Born: 2 September 1888 Karlskrona, Sweden
- Died: 26 November 1959 (aged 71) Djursholm, Danderyd, Sweden

Sport
- Sport: Rowing
- Club: Stockholms RK

Gustaf Otto Brunkman (2 September 1888 – 26 November 1959) was a Swedish rower. He competed at the 1912 Summer Olympics alongside his elder brother Conrad, but was eliminated in the quarterfinals of the men's eight tournament.
