= Otto Krogh =

Norwegian rower

Personal information
- Born: 22 April 1878 Hamar, Norway
- Died: 3 March 1952 (aged 73)

Sport
- Sport: Rowing

Otto Theodor Krogh (22 April 1878 – 3 March 1952) was a Norwegian rower. He was born in Hamar, and competed for Christiania Roklub. He competed in the eight at the 1912 Summer Olympics in Stockholm.
