= Conrad Brunkman =

Swedish rower (1887–1925)

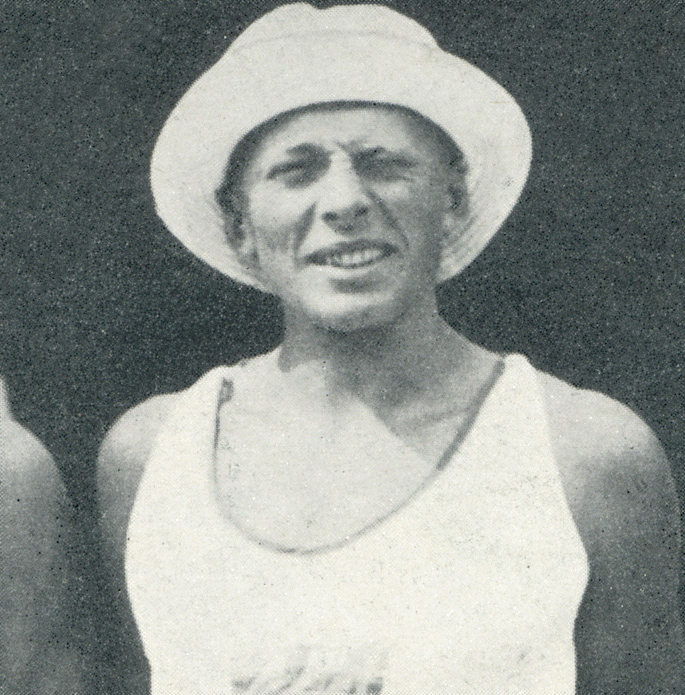

Personal information
- Born: 20 January 1887 Helsingborg, Sweden
- Died: 27 May 1925 (aged 38) Lund, Sweden

Sport
- Sport: Rowing
- Club: Stockholms RK
Medal record
Representing Sweden
Olympic Games
Silver medal – second place	1912 Stockholm	Coxed four, inriggers

Conrad Anton Olsson Brunkman (20 January 1887 – 27 May 1925), also spelled Konrad, was a Swedish rower who competed in the 1912 Summer Olympics. He won a silver medal in the coxed four, inriggers, and failed to reach the finals of the eight tournament. His younger brother Gustaf competed alongside in the men's eight.
