= Birger Amundin =

Swedish rower

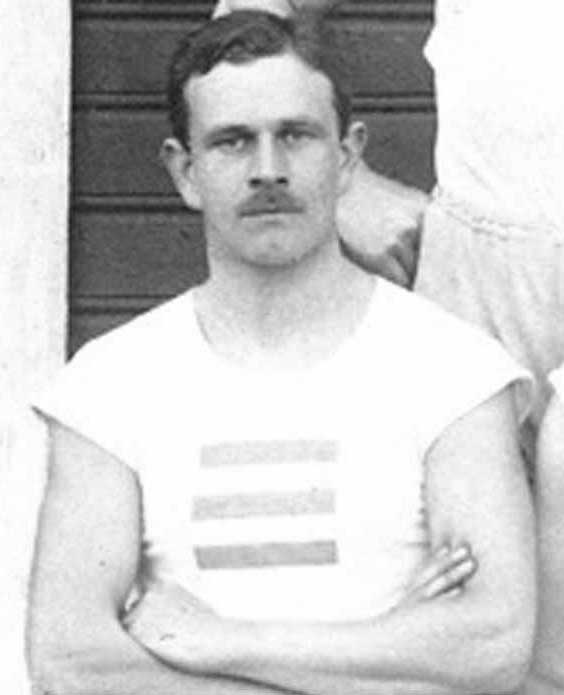

Personal information
- Born: 20 February 1880 Flo, Grästorp, Sweden
- Died: 22 April 1965 (aged 85) Ödsmål, Sweden

Sport
- Sport: Rowing
- Club: Göteborgs RK

Gudmund Birger Amundin (20 February 1880 – 22 April 1965) was a Swedish rower who competed in the 1912 Summer Olympics. He was a crew member of the Swedish boat Göteborgs that was eliminated in the first round of the men's eight tournament.
