= István Szebeny =

Hungarian rower

Personal information
- Nationality: Hungarian
- Born: 22 November 1890; Budapest, Austria-Hungary
- Died: 11 March 1953 (aged 62)
- Relatives: Miklós Szebeny (brother); György Szebeny (brother); Antal Szebeny (brother)

Sport
- Sport: Rowing

István Szebeny (22 November 1890 – 11 March 1953) was a Hungarian rower. He competed in the men's eight event at the 1912 Summer Olympics. Three elder brothers, Miklós, György and Antal, were also Olympic rowers.
