= Miklós Szebeny =

Hungarian rower

Personal information
- Nationality: Hungarian
- Born: 18 November 1887 Budapest, Austria-Hungary
- Died: 18 June 1919 (aged 31) Tard, Hungary
- Weight: 76 kg (168 lb)
- Relatives: György Szebeny (twin brother); Antal Szebeny (brother); István Szebeny (brother)

Sport
- Sport: Rowing
- Club: Hungária Evezős Egylet
Medal record
Men's rowing
Representing Hungary
European Rowing Championships
Bronze medal – third place	1910 Ostend	Eight

Miklós Szebeny (18 November 1887 – 18 June 1919) was a Hungarian rower. He competed in the men's eight event at the 1912 Summer Olympics. Three brothers, Antal, György and István, were also Olympic rowers; György was his twin.
