= Gustaf Broberg =

Swedish rower

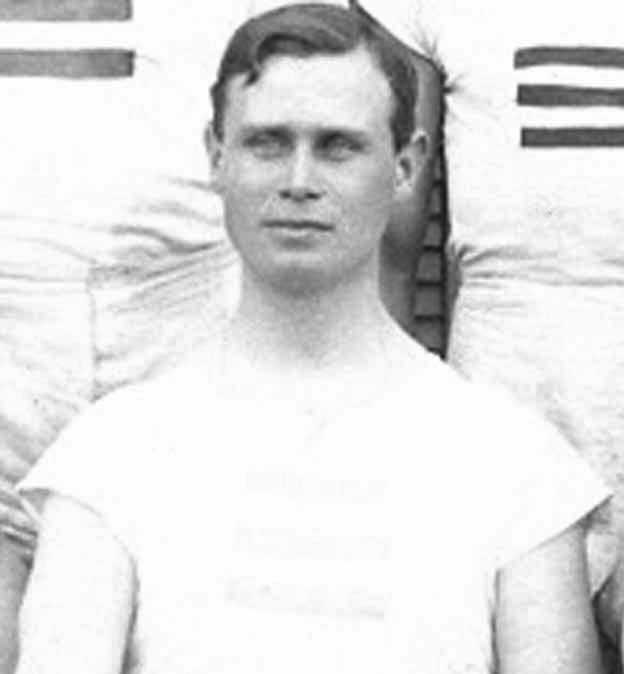

Personal information
- Born: 18 October 1885 Skövde, Sweden
- Died: 2 October 1952 (aged 66) Gothenburg, Sweden

Sport
- Sport: Rowing
- Club: Göteborgs RK

Carl Gustaf Gideon Broberg (18 October 1885 – 2 October 1952) was a Swedish rower who competed in the 1912 Summer Olympics. He was a crew member of the Swedish boat Göteborgs that was eliminated in the first round of the men's eight tournament.
