= Sir William Parker, 3rd Baronet =

British rower

Olympic medal record

Men's rowing
Silver medal – second place	1912 Stockholm	Eight

Sir William Lorenzo Parker, 3rd Baronet (9 January 1889 – 27 October 1971) was a British rower who competed in the 1912 Summer Olympics.

Parker was born in Kensington, London. He inherited the baronetcy on the death of Sir William Biddulph Parker, 2nd Baronet on 23 January 1902. He was educated at New College, Oxford. He was a member of the New College eight which won the silver medal for Great Britain rowing at the 1912 Summer Olympics.

In April 1913, Parker was appointed Assistant Inspector by the Board of Agriculture and Fisheries. Parker was Lord Lieutenant of Brecknockshire from 1959 to 1964.

Honorary titles
Preceded by Sir Geoffrey Raikes	Lord Lieutenant of Brecknockshire; 1959–1964	Succeeded by Nevill Glennie Garnons Williams
Baronetage of the United Kingdom
Preceded by William Biddulph Parker	Baronet (of Shenstone Lodge); 1902–1971	Succeeded by William Alan Parker
