= Willi Bartholomae =

German rower (1885–1955)

Olympic medal record

Men's rowing
Bronze medal – third place	1912 Stockholm	Eight

Wilhelm "Willi" Bartholomae (31 January 1885 – 26 April 1955) was a German rower who competed for the German Empire in the 1912 Summer Olympics. The German team won the bronze medal in the eight.

Bartholomae was born in Krefeld on 31 January 1885. He died in Düsseldorf on 26 April 1955 at the age of 70.

== 1912 German Men's eights rowing team ==
- Otto Liebing
- Max Bröske
- Fritz Bartholomae, Willi's brother
- Willi Bartholomae
- Werner Dehn
- Rudolf Reichelt
- Hans Matthiae
- Kurt Runge
- Max Vetter
