= Hans Matthiae =

German rower

Olympic medal record

Men's rowing
Bronze medal – third place	1912 Stockholm	Eight

Hans Matthiae (22 December 1884 – 21 November 1948) was a Germany rower who competed in the 1912 Summer Olympics. He was the strokeman of the German boat, which won the bronze medal in the eights.

== 1912 German Men's eights rowing team ==
- Otto Liebing
- Max Bröske
- Fritz Bartholomae
- Willi Bartholomae
- Werner Dehn
- Rudolf Reichelt
- Hans Matthiae
- Kurt Runge
- Max Vetter
