= Harry Ross-Soden =

Australian rower

Personal information
- Nationality: Australian
- Born: 17 May 1886; Melbourne, Australia
- Died: 29 June 1944 (aged 58); Sandringham, Victoria, Australia

Sport
- Sport: Rowing

Harry Ross-Soden (17 May 1886 – 29 June 1944) was an Australian rower who competed at the 1912 Summer Olympics.

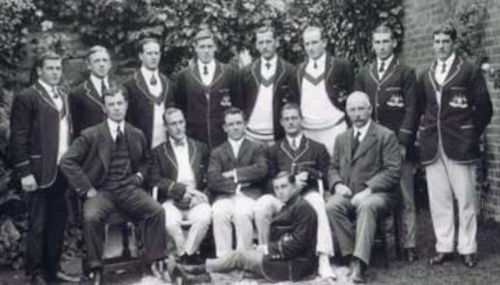
Ross-Soden (seated 2nd from right) with the 1912 Aust Olympic VIII, incl reserves & selectors

== University rowing ==
Born in St Kilda, Melbourne Ross-Soden attended Melbourne Grammar School where he took up rowing. He rowed in the Melbourne Grammar first VIII in his three senior years at school.

He studied law at Melbourne University and rowed for Trinity College (University of Melbourne). He rowed in the Melbourne University eight at the Australian Intervarsity Championships of 1908, 1909, 1910 and 1911. In 1913, by now rowing with the Banks Rowing Club, he was selected in the Victorian eight to contest the men's eight event at the Interstate Regatta.

== International representative rowing ==
An Australian eight was selected in 1912 to compete at the Henley Royal Regatta and the Stockholm Olympics. It was a co-operative venture between the NSW and the Victorian Rowing Associations, there being no Australian governing body at the time. Much of the funding for the trip came from the Victorian Rowing Association and the families of the two Victorian crew members Ross-Soden and Simon Fraser.

The Australian eight needed to nominate at Henley as a club entrant and raced as the Sydney Rowing Club from which five of the crew and coxswain were drawn. Ross-Soden, Fraser and the Leichhardt man Henry Hauenstein joined the Sydney club to legitimise their entry. Ross-Soden rowed in the seven seat at Henley when the eight progressed through their match races and beat the Leander Club in the final to take the 1912 Grand Challenge Cup. Onto Sweden for the 1912 Summer Olympics and with Keith Heritage changed out for the UK resident Australian Hugh Ward, Ross-Soden again rowed at seven. They beat a Swedish crew in the first round then in the quarter-final they were knocked-out by same Leander eight they'd triumphed over at Henley.

== War service ==
Ross-Soden was involved in a traffic accident in Toorak Rd, South Yarra in 1913. It resulted in long legal proceeding where he was the defendant which went to the High Court of Australia and did not finalise until 1916. He then enlisted in the AIF and joined the 39th Battalion. He left Australia for England arriving in April 1917 where he received officer training with a machine gun company, he was posted to France in 1918, but was put on sick leave due to having a stone in his bladder, he returned to England and stayed there until 1919 when he moved back to Australia.

In the preparation for the 1919 Peace Regatta Ross-Soden trialled in the various AIF eights. He was a member of the sub-committee charged with the coaching and selection of the 1919 AIF crews and in the final week before the event he co-coached AIF #1 eight which won the event and brought the King's Cup to Australia.
