= Thomas Gillespie (rower) =

Scottish rower

Olympic medal record

Men's rowing
| Silver medal – second place | 1912 Stockholm | Eight |

Thomas Cunningham Gillespie (14 December 1892 – 18 October 1914) was a Scottish rower who competed in the 1912 Summer Olympics. He was killed in action in the First World War.

Gillespie was the son of Thomas Paterson Gillespie and his wife, Elizabeth Hall Chalmers of Longcroft Linlithgow. He was educated at Cargilfield Preparatory School Cramond Bridge, Winchester College and New College, Oxford. He rowed for his college for three years when they were twice Head of the River and was a member of the New College eight which won the silver medal for Great Britain rowing at the 1912 Summer Olympics.

Gillespie obtained a university commission in the King's Own Scottish Borderers and joined them on the outbreak of the First World War. He was a lieutenant in the First Battle of the Aisne. He was killed in action at La Bassée, aged 21. His remains were not recovered. His name is recorded on the Le Touret Memorial nearby. His brother Alexander Douglas Gillespie was also killed in the war, and his letters are preserved.

During an edition of BBC television's Countryfile screened on 9 November 2014, it was revealed that Gillespie is the great-uncle of presenter Tom Heap.

== See also ==
- List of Olympians killed in World War I
