= Fritz Bartholomae =

German rower

Personal information
- Born: Friedrich Carl Bartholomae; 29 October 1886 Krefeld, German Empire
- Died: 12 September 1915 (aged 28) Courland, Russian Empire
- Relatives: Willi Bartholomae (brother)

Sport
- Sport: Rowing
- Club: BRC, Berlin
Medal record
Men's rowing
Representing Germany
Olympic Games
Bronze medal – third place	1912 Stockholm	Men's eight

Friedrich Carl Bartholomae (29 October 1886 – 12 September 1915) was a German rower who competed for the German Empire in the 1912 Summer Olympics. The German team won the bronze medal in the eight. He was killed in action during World War I.

== 1912 German Men's eights rowing team ==
- Otto Liebing
- Max Bröske
- Fritz Bartholomae
- Willi Bartholomae
- Werner Dehn
- Rudolf Reichelt
- Hans Matthiae
- Kurt Runge
- Max Vetter

== See also ==
- List of Olympians killed in World War I
