= Anders Almqvist =

Swedish rower

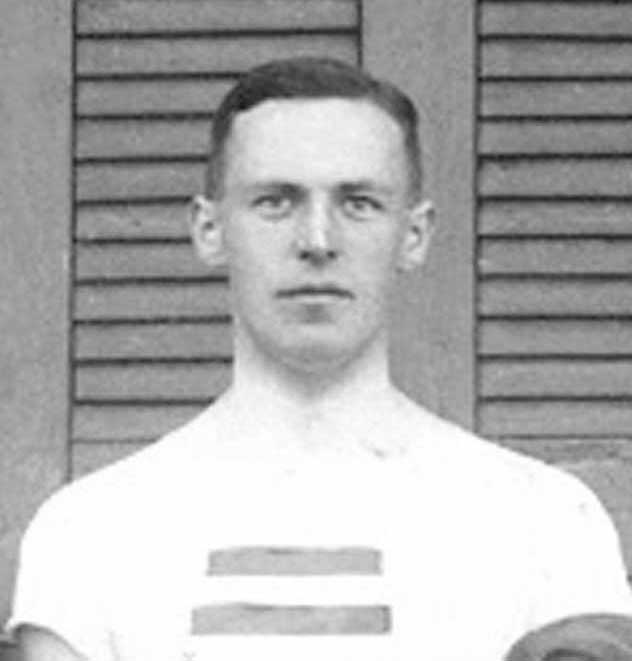

Personal information
- Born: 2 July 1885 Gothenburg, Sweden
- Died: 30 November 1915 (aged 30) Göteborg, Sweden

Sport
- Sport: Rowing
- Club: Göteborgs RK

Anders Conrad Wilhelm Almqvist (2 July 1885 – 30 November 1915) was a Swedish rower who competed in the 1912 Summer Olympics. He was a member of the Swedish boat Göteborgs that was eliminated in the first round of the men's eight tournament.
