= Per Mattson =

Swedish rower

Per Alfred Mattson was a Swedish rower who competed in the 1912 Summer Olympics.

He was a member of the Swedish boat Roddklubben af 1912 which was eliminated in the quarterfinals of the men's eight tournament.
