= Arthur Wiggins =

British rower

Olympic medal record

Men's rowing
Silver medal – second place	1912 Stockholm	Eight

Arthur Frederick Reginald Wiggins (4 December 1891 – 23 July 1961) was a British rower who competed in the 1912 Summer Olympics.

Wiggins was born in Bournemouth. He was educated at New College, Oxford. In 1912 he was a member of the Oxford Boat in the Boat Race. He was then a crew member of the New College eight, which won the silver medal for Great Britain rowing at the 1912 Summer Olympics. Wiggins rowed for Oxford again in the Boat Race in 1913 and 1914.

== See also ==
- List of Oxford University Boat Race crews
