= Thomas Parker (rower) =

Australian rower

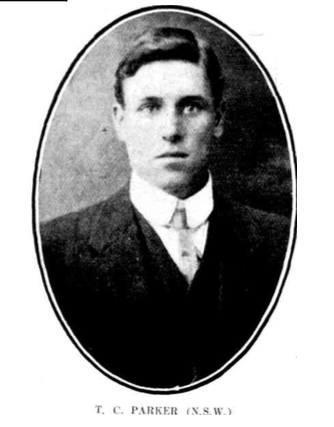

Personal information
- Nationality: Australian
- Born: 18 August 1883 Solomontown, South Australia
- Died: 24 March 1965 Narrabeen, New South Wales

Sport
- Sport: Rowing
- Club: Balmain Rowing Club

Achievements and titles
- National finals: Interstate C'ship M8+ 1911

Thomas Cornelius Parker (18 August 1883 – 24 March 1965) was an Australian rower who competed at the 1912 Summer Olympics.

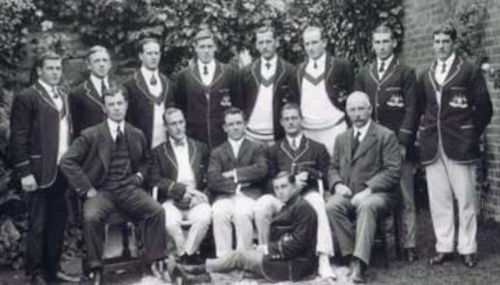
Parker (backrow 4th from left) with the 1912 Aust Olympic VIII, incl reserves & selectors

Parker rowed for the Balmain Rowing Club. In 1911, he rowed at four in the New South Wales crew, which won the men's eight at the annual Australian Interstate Regatta.

In 1912, he was a member of the Australian men's eight, which, racing as a Sydney Rowing Club entrant, won the Grand Challenge Cup on the River Thames at the Henley Royal Regatta. The eight then moved to Stockholm for the 1912 Summer Olympics, where, after beating a Swedish eight in the first round they were beaten by a Great Britain crew in the second round—the same Leander eight they had beaten at Henley a few weeks earlier.

In 1913, Parker moved into the ranks of professional rowing.
