= Albert Kent =

Canadian rower

Pud Kent
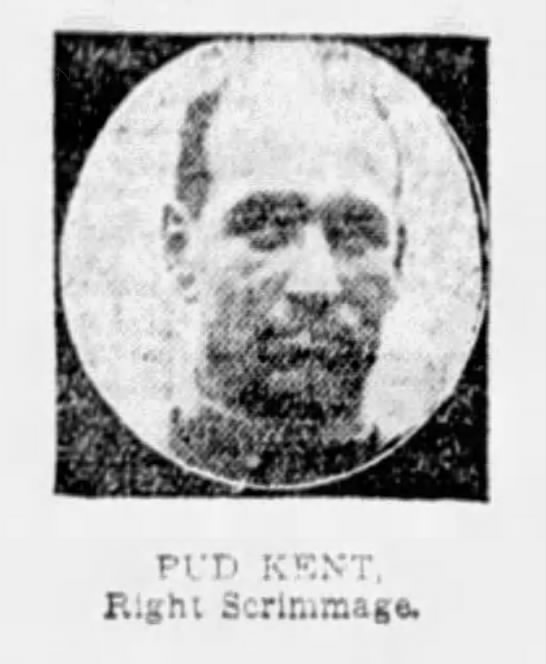
- Pud Kent in 1911

Personal information
- Born: 4 November 1877
- Died: 15 October 1923 (aged 45)
- Listed weight: 185 lb (84 kg)

Career history

Playing
- 1900-1902, 1900s: Toronto Argonauts

Coaching
- 1901–1903: Toronto Argonauts

Albert Hilton Ernest "Pud" Kent (4 November 1877 – 15 October 1923) was a Canadian football player and coach who was the head coach of the Toronto Argonauts from 1901 to 1903. From the late 1900s to the 1910s, he was a referee for Canadian football and rugby games. He was the team captain until 1902. He was also a rower, and competed in the men's eight event at the 1912 Summer Olympics.
