= Robert Waley =

Australian rowing cox

Ken Waley
Personal information
- Nationality: Australian
- Born: Robert George Krulock Waley; 26 November 1889 Burwood, New South Wales, Australia
- Died: 10 September 1939 (aged 49) Sydney, Australia

Sport
- Sport: Rowing
- Club: Sydney Rowing Club

Achievements and titles
- National finals: Interstate Championship M8+ 1910,11

Robert George Krulock "Ken" Waley (26 November 1889 – 10 September 1939) was an Australian coxswain who competed in the 1912 Summer Olympics. He was Australia's first selected representative coxswain.

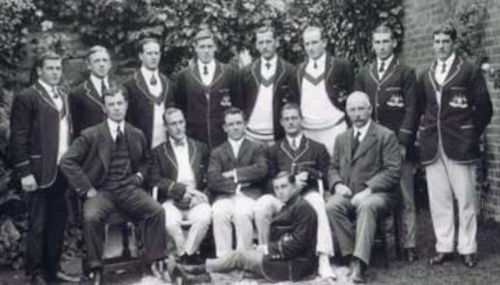
Waley (seated front) with the 1912 Aust Olympic VIII, incl reserves & selectors

== Rowing career ==
Waley was educated at The King's School then The Armidale School (1902-1905) and subsequently at the University of Sydney, where he was introduced to rowing whilst a student at St Paul's College. In 1909, he coxed the Sydney University eight, which won the men's eight event at the Australian University Championships. His senior club rowing was from the Sydney Rowing Club.

In 1910 and 1911 he steered the New South Wales crews to victory in the men's eight at the annual Australian Interstate Regatta.

He was coxswain in a 1912 Australian eight which racing as Sydney Rowing Club, won the Grand Challenge Cup at Henley-on-Thames, where they beat the Leander Club. As an Australasian representative crew, they then travelled to Stockholm, Sweden for the 1912 Summer Olympics, where after beating a Swedish crew in the first round, they were then knocked-out in the quarter-final by the same Leander eight they had defeated at Henley a few weeks earlier. This was the first Australian international representative rowing crew and Waley was thus Australia's first representative coxswain.

== War service ==
Waley enlisted late in WWI as he neared age 30 and gave his occupation as a company manager. He served in the Flying Corps and was promoted from Private to Sergeant during his short service period. He was returned to Australia just before the war's end for duty at the Central Flying School Australia but was almost immediately discharged.
