= Keith Heritage =

Australian rower and military officer

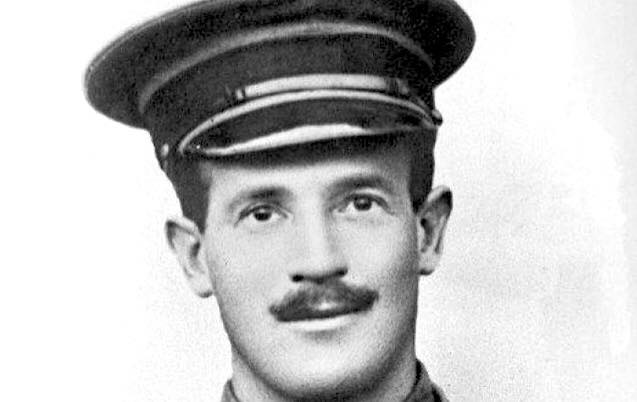
- Born: 1882; Longford, Tasmania
- Died: 26 July 1916 (aged 33–34); Pozieres, France
- Burial place: Pozières Memorial, France
- Military career
- Allegiance: Australia
- Branch: Australian Imperial Force
- Service years: 1914–16
- Rank: Captain
- Unit: 19th Battalion
- Conflicts: First World War; Pacific theatre; Australian occupation of German New Guinea; Battle of Bita Paka; Gallipoli Campaign; Western Front; Battle of the Somme; Battle of Pozieres †
- Awards: Military Cross

Keith Heritage
Personal information
- Nationality: Australian

Sport
- Sport: Rowing
- Club: Sydney Rowing Club

Achievements and titles
- National finals: Interstate C'ship M8+ 1909-1911

Keith Heritage MC (1882 – 26 July 1916) was an Australian national champion and representative rower and a 1st AIF officer who fell on the Western Front in WWI. He is credited with being the first Australian to volunteer for the AIF at the outbreak of WWI and as one of the last Australian officers to leave Anzac Cove at the end of the Gallipoli Campaign. As a rower he was twice an Australian national champion and he won the Grand Challenge Cup in an Australian representative eight racing as Sydney Rowing Club at the 1912 Henley Royal Regatta. He saw action in WWI in German New Guinea, Gallipoli and on the Western Front and was awarded the Military Cross.

== Family history ==
Born and raised near Launceston, Tasmania, Heritage was one of eight children of George and Eleanora Heritage, of Longford. Keith Heritage's English grandfather James stole a book in Somerset and later, a silver plate worth five pounds. For these crimes he was transported as a convict to Van Diemen's Land. James Heritage served his time, trained as a draper's assistant, married and had three children. His son George Heritage, Keith's father, became Tasmania's Inspector of Schools.

== Club and state rowing ==
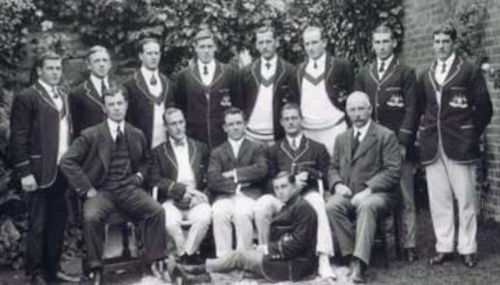
Heritage (backrow 3rd from left) with the 1912 Aust Olympic squad, incl reserves & selectors

In 1909 Keith Heritage rowed in the seven seat of the Tasmanian crew which won the men's eight event at the annual Australian Interstate Regatta. The following year he was again in the Tasmanian men's eight. They finished third at that year's interstate regatta. By 1911 Heritage was in Sydney, rowing from Sydney Rowing Club and eligible to row for New South Wales. He was selected in the seven seat of the 1911 New South Wales men's eight which won at that year's Australian Interstate Regatta.

In 1912 he was selected in the Australian squad to travel to Europe for the 1912 Stockholm Olympics. He was a member of the Australian men's eight which racing as a Sydney Rowing Club entrant, won the Grand Challenge Cup on the River Thames at the Henley Royal Regatta. Heritage was then controversially replaced by Hugh Ward, a UK resident Australian medical student who had raced for New College, Oxford against the Sydney eight at Henley that year. With Heritage changed out for Ward, the Sydney eight went on to compete as an Australasian representative eight in the 1912 Summer Olympics Men's eight race and was knocked out in their second match race - a quarter-final. They were beaten by the same Leander eight they'd beaten at Henley a few weeks earlier.

== Military career ==
Before leaving Tasmania Heritage had military experience including five years with the Tasmanian Infantry Regiment as a sergeant and six years with the Launceston Infantry Regiment where he held the rank of colour sergeant in a machine-gun section.

Post-war research determined that Heritage was the first Australian to enlist for service in World War I, joining up on 11 August 1914. At the time of joining the army one week after Britain's declaration of war, Heritage was aged 32, a bachelor living in Sydney where he worked for the Union Steam Ship Company as a Traffic Manager.

The First Australian Imperial Force had not yet been formed in August 1914. Heritage joined the Australian Naval and Military Expeditionary Force which was assembled and dispatched to New Guinea within days of the war commencing, with the objective of ousting Germany from its colonies in New Guinea. Heritage was appointed a Lieutenant Transport Officer and sailed on the HMAT Berima on 17 August 1914 to Rabaul, in New Britain where was part of the force that secured the German communications facility in German New Guinea.

Heritage returned to Australia in 1915 and joined the 19th Battalion AIF as a lieutenant. On 21 August 1915 he landed at Gallipoli with his Sydney Rowing Club and Australian crew mate Sydney Middleton. He served in Gallipoli for several months until the Anzac force was evacuated and during that period was promoted to captain. He was commended for his work helping plan the troops’ departure under cover of darkness, left the Gallipoli peninsula during the evacuation on the night of 19 December and was one of the last Anzacs to be evacuated from the peninsula.

Heritage then served on the Western Front in France. On 1 July 1916 his bravery was noted by General Sir William Birdwood, following a successful raid on enemy trenches on the night of 25–26 June and for which was awarded the Military Cross The citation for the medal, which appeared in The London Gazette in August 1916, reads as follows:

For conspicuous gallantry during a raid on the enemy's trenches. About twenty of the enemy were killed and four prisoners taken. He carried back a wounded man single-handed, and throughout the raid set a fine example of cool courage.

The raid was a quick-strike - to be in and out before the Germans could counter-attack. Heritage's raiding party occupied the trenches for just five minutes and blew up two munitions stores. Heritage then ordered his men back to the Australian positions and waited in the German trench until his patrol was on its way back. By this time the main enemy force was fully alerted to what was happening and poured fire towards the Australians. "He carried back a wounded man single-handed and throughout the raid set a fine example of cool courage," the citation concluded. It is likely Heritage never knew of the honour as he was killed in action and buried in the field at Pozieres a month before news of his award was made public.

On 26 July 1916, a month after his gallant raid, Heritage was killed in action. While making his rounds in the trenches on 26 July 1916 he told two tired-looking soldiers to take a break. He gave them some of his own food and took up their post. Within moments, a high-explosive shell landed upon him, killing him instantly. According to a statement by Lieutenant L Layton-Smith: "Captain Heritage was killed outright at Pozieres on 26 July 1916. He was buried in the field at Pozieres and a cross was erected over his grave. This however may now have disappeared in view of the subsequent fighting which took place on that ground in 1918." He is commemorated on the British Pozières Memorial, Ovillers-La Boisselle, Pozieres.

== Family war service ==
Four of Heritage's brothers also saw action in the First World War. Francis Bede Heritage was awarded the French Croix de Guerre and after the war headed the Royal Military College, Duntroon. He retired as army quartermaster-general. Lieutenant Austin Heritage also received the Military Cross for leading his men in an attack on a heavily defended position and rallying them while wounded and under heavy fire.

Sapper Robert Heritage was serving with a pioneer battalion and was sent home after suffering a severe septic infection. The fifth brother, Stanley Heritage, was working in Nevada when war broke out and he went north to join the Canadian forces.
