= Frederick Pitman =

British rower

Olympic medal record

Men's rowing
Silver medal – second place	1912 Stockholm	Men's eight

Frederick Archibald Hugo Pitman (1 June 1892 – 25 July 1963) was a Scottish rower who competed for Great Britain and Ireland in the 1912 Summer Olympics.

Pitman was born in Edinburgh, the son of Frederick I Pitman, an eminent rower. He was educated at Eton College, where he was a successful half-miler and a member of the college eight. He went on to New College, Oxford. In 1912, he was bowman of the winning Oxford boat in the Boat Race. He was then a crew member of the New College eight, which won the silver medal for Great Britain rowing at the 1912 Summer Olympics. In 1914 he stroked the unsuccessful Oxford crew in the Boat Race.

On the outbreak of the First World War, Pitman joined the 3rd Battalion of the Royal Scots. He survived the war, and died in London at the age of 71.

== See also ==
- List of Oxford University Boat Race crews
