= Thomas Høie =

Norwegian rower

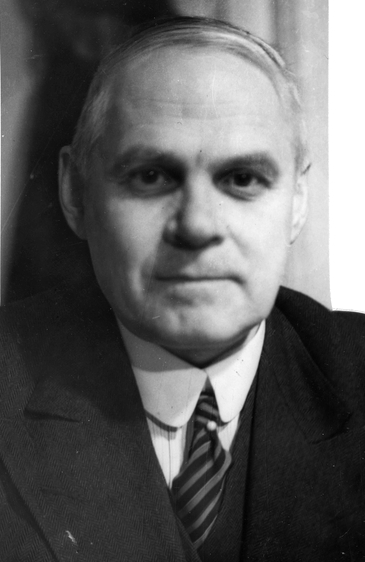
- Thomas Høie, c. 1933

Personal information
- Nationality: Norwegian
- Born: 28 April 1883
- Died: 30 August 1948 (aged 65)

Sport
- Sport: Rowing
- Club: Christiania RK

Thomas Høie (28 April 1883 – 30 August 1948) was a Norwegian rower who competed for Christiania Roklub. He competed in the men's eight at the 1912 Summer Olympics in Stockholm. He was an educated engineer and married Louise Wilhelmine Collett Høie (16 May 1981 – 27 February 1991) in 1918.
