= John Ryrie =

Australian rower

Jack Ryrie
- Ryrie in 1908

Personal information
- Nationality: Australian
- Born: John Augustus George Ryrie; 21 December 1886 Trangie, NSW, Australia
- Died: 1 June 1927 (aged 40) Gilgandra, New South Wales, Australia
- Education: The King's School

Sport
- Sport: Rowing
- Club: Sydney Rowing Club

Achievements and titles
- National finals: Interstate C'ship M8+ 1908, 1911

John Augustus George Ryrie (21 December 1886 – 1 June 1927) was a two-time Australian national champion rower who represented Australasia at the 1912 Summer Olympics.

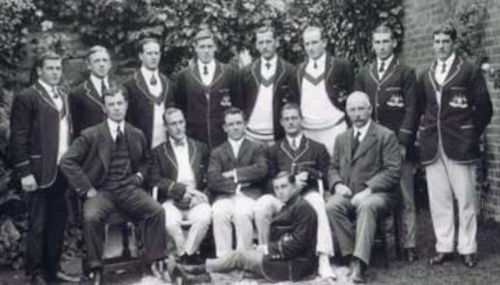
Ryrie (backrow 2nd from right) with the 1912 Aust Olympic VIII, incl reserves & selectors

== Rowing career ==
Jack Ryrie's father was John Cassels Ryrie, a pastoralist from Trangie in central northern New South Wales.

Jack was educated at The King's School in Sydney, where he distinguished himself in his studies and the sporting fields of cricket, rowing, and football. His senior club rowing was from the Sydney Rowing Club. He was a member of the New South Wales eight, which won the 1908 Australian Interstate Championship, the first time in 15 years his state had won the title. He repeated this feat in 1911, rowing in the bow of the victorious New South Wales eight.

The following year, Ryrie was a member of the Australasian eight which represented at the 1912 Summer Olympics in Stockholm. In the first round they beat a Swedish boat by two lengths, but in the next round they were up against the Leander Club from Great Britain and lost by half a length. The overseas tour wasn't totally a loss as before the Olympics, he was part of the Sydney Rowing Club eight which won the 1912 Grand Challenge Cup at the Henley Royal Regatta. In that victory, they beat the same eight Leander who knocked them out of the Olympic regatta a few weeks later.

== War service and death ==
In January 1915, he went to England to enlist and joined the 4th Staffordshire Regiment. He saw active service and was wounded while in France. After recovering, he was commissioned into the Machine Gun Corps and served in Palestine. At the war's end, he returned to Australia.

On 1 June 1927, playing polo at the Gilgandra carnival, he cut across two players while riding hard for the ball. He crashed into both of them and fell heavily, breaking his neck and died instantly. He left behind a wife and three young daughters.
