= Beaufort Burdekin =

British rower (1891–1963)

Olympic medal record

Men's rowing
Silver medal – second place	1912 Stockholm	Men's eight

Beaufort Burdekin (27 December 1891 – 15 May 1963) was a British rower who competed in the 1912 Summer Olympics.

Burdekin was born in Dorset but came from an Australian family after whom the Burdekin River was named. He was the youngest child of Sydney Burdekin and Lady Catherine Burdekin, nee Byrne. His father had been Mayor of Sydney from 1890-1891 but resigned the role due to ill-health and to travel with Catherine to England, where Beaufort was born.

He was educated at Cheltenham College and at New College, Oxford. He was a crew member of the New College eight which won the silver medal for Great Britain rowing at the 1912 Summer Olympics. In 1914 he was a member of the Oxford Boat in the Boat Race.

Burdekin became a member of Inner Temple. He served in the Royal Field Artillery during World War I and was wounded in action in France. In 1920 he went with his family to Sydney, Australia where he was a barrister.

Burdekin married the feminist novelist Katharine Penelope Cade in 1915. They had two daughters, Katharine Jayne (b. 1917) and Helen Eugenie (b. 1920). The marriage ended in 1922.

== See also ==
- List of Oxford University Boat Race crews
