= Ragnar Bergstedt =

Swedish rower

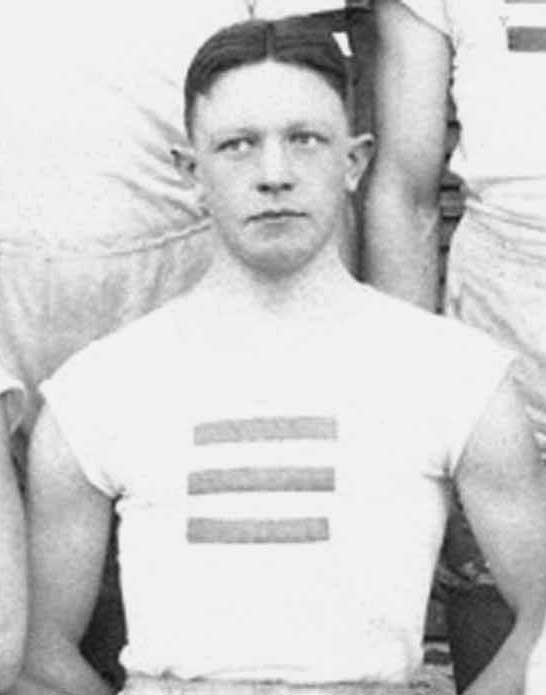

Personal information
- Born: 10 July 1889 Säffle, Sweden
- Died: 22 October 1987 (aged 98) Västerås, Sweden

Sport
- Sport: Rowing
- Club: Göteborgs RK

Ragnar Fredrik Bergstedt (10 July 1889 – 22 October 1987) was a Swedish rower who competed in the 1912 Summer Olympics. He was a crew member of the Swedish boat Göteborgs that was eliminated in the first round of the men's eight tournament.
