= Philip Fleming (banker) =

British merchant banker and rower (1889–1971)

Medal record

Men's rowing

Representing Great Britain

Olympic Games
Gold medal – first place	1912 Stockholm	Men's eight

Philip Fleming (15 August 1889 – 13 October 1971) was a British merchant banker and rower who competed in the 1912 Summer Olympics.

== Early life ==
Philip Fleming was born on 15 August 1889 at Newport-on-Tay, Fife, Scotland. He was the son of Robert Fleming, a merchant banker. Fleming was educated at Eton College and Magdalen College, Oxford. During World War I, he and his brother Valentine Fleming joined the Queen's Own Oxfordshire Hussars, in which his brother was killed.

== Boating ==
Fleming made one appearance for Oxford in the Boat Race rowing in the winning boat of 1910. He joined Leander Club, and in 1912, he was strokeman of the Leander eight, which won the gold medal for Great Britain rowing at the 1912 Summer Olympics. The Leander eight beat the crew from New College, Oxford by one length in the Olympic final in Stockholm. The 2003 Oxford blue boat, which won the Boat Race by 1 foot, was named 'Philip Fleming'.

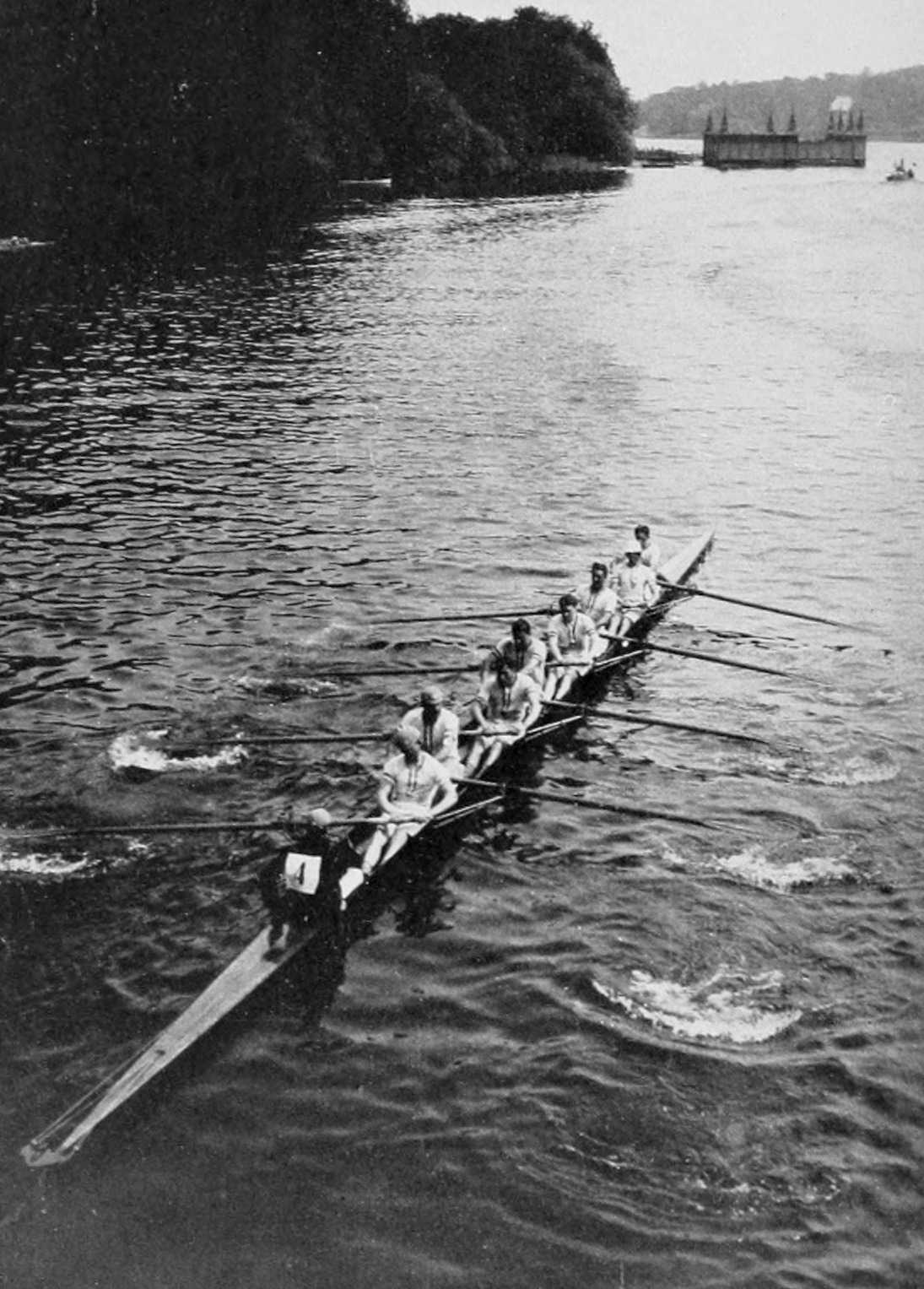
The British Leander Club eight – Fleming at stroke

== Career ==
He was a partner of Robert Fleming & Co, the merchant bank, and held many directorships. Fleming rode with the Bicester and the Heythrop Hunts. He was Deputy Lieutenant of Oxfordshire and High Sheriff of Oxfordshire in 1948. In 1951, he founded the PF Charitable Trust.

== Personal life ==
Fleming married Jean Hunloke, the daughter of Philip Hunloke, who had won a bronze medal sailing at the 1908 Summer Olympics. Fleming is the grandfather of Rory Fleming and uncle of Ian Fleming, the creator of James Bond.

== Death ==
Fleming died at Woodstock, Oxfordshire at the age of 82.

== See also ==
- List of Oxford University Boat Race crews
