= Edgar Burgess =

English rower (1891–1952)

Olympic medal record

Men's rowing

Representing Great Britain
Gold medal – first place	1912 Stockholm	Eight

Edgar Richard Burgess FZS (23 September 1891 – 23 April 1952) was an English rower who competed for Great Britain in the 1912 Summer Olympics.

Burgess was born in London and educated at Eton College and Magdalen College, Oxford, where he was a Diploma student in anthropology. He joined Leander Club and was bowman of the Leander eight which won the gold medal for Great Britain rowing at the 1912 Summer Olympics. He was the only member of the crew who had not won a blue rowing in the Boat Race. In 1913, he was bow for the winning Oxford in the Boat Race.

Burgess was a member of the Inner Temple and spent many years with the Sudan Political Service. He was a Fellow of the Zoological Society. On retirement, he lived in Morocco where he died at his home in Tangier.

== See also ==
- List of Oxford University Boat Race crews
