= Antal Szebeny =

Hungarian rower

Personal information
- Nationality: Hungarian
- Born: 6 April 1886 Budapest, Austria-Hungary
- Died: 18 June 1936 (aged 50)
- Weight: 77 kg (170 lb)
- Relatives: Miklós Szebeny (brother); György Szebeny (brother); István Szebeny (brother)

Sport
- Sport: Rowing
- Club: Hungária Evezős Egylet
Medal record
Men's rowing
Representing Hungary
European Rowing Championships
Bronze medal – third place	1910 Ostend	Eight

Antal Szebeny (6 April 1886 – 18 June 1936) was a Hungarian rower. He competed at the 1908 Summer Olympics and the 1912 Summer Olympics. Three younger brothers, Miklós, György and István, were also Olympic rowers.
