= Jean Arné =

French rower

Personal information
- Nationality: French
- Born: 26 February 1891; Bayonne, France
- Died: 6 May 1917 (aged 26); Craonnelle, France

Sport
- Sport: Rowing

Jean Baptiste Pierre Arné (26 February 1891 – 6 May 1917) was a French rower. He competed in the men's eight event at the 1912 Summer Olympics. He was killed in action during World War I.
