= Leslie Wormald =

English rower

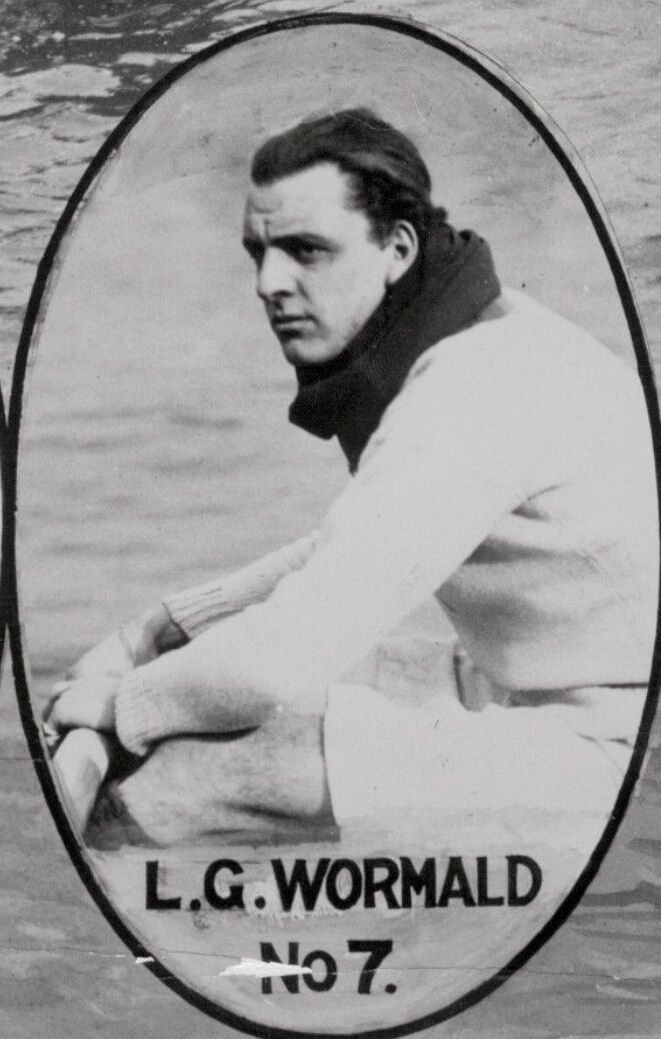

Medal record

Men's rowing

Representing Great Britain

Olympic Games
Gold medal – first place	1912 Stockholm	Eight

Leslie Graham Wormald (19 August 1890 – 10 July 1965) was an English rower who competed in the 1912 Summer Olympics representing Great Britain.

Wormald was born at Maidenhead. He was educated at Eton College, where he only rowed in the second eight, and then at Magdalen College, Oxford, where his rowing showed considerable improvement. In 1910, he was in the Magdalen boat, which finished the Head of the River and won the Grand Challenge Cup at Henley Royal Regatta. In 1911, he was in the winning Oxford crew in the Boat Race and in the Magdalen boat, which won the Grand at Henley again. In 1912, he was again on the winning Oxford crew in the boat race. He joined Leander Club and was a member of the Leander eight, which won the gold medal for Great Britain rowing at the 1912 Summer Olympics. In 1913, Wormald was in the winning Oxford crew in the Boat Race for the third time.

Wormald served in the First World War and won a Military Cross while in France in 1918.

Wormald retired to Spain and died at the Hyde Park Hotel in London (today called the Mandarin Oriental Hyde Park, London) while visiting England.

== See also ==
- List of Oxford University Boat Race crews
