= Simon Fraser (Australian sportsman) =

Australian sportsman

Simon Fraser Jr.
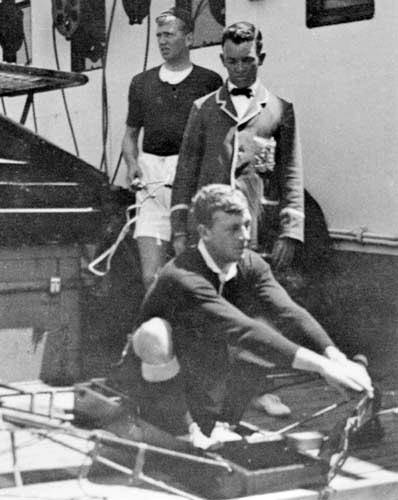
- Fraser in 1912

Personal information
- Nationality: Australian
- Born: Simon Fraser; 25 August 1886 St Kilda, Victoria
- Died: 11 May 1919 (aged 32) Penshurst, Victoria
- Education: Melbourne Grammar School

Sport
- Sport: Rowing
- Club: Melbourne Uni Boat Club

Simon Fraser

Personal information
- Full name: Simon Fraser
- Original team: Melbourne Grammar School
- Position: Full forward

Playing career^{1}
| Years | Club | Games (Goals) |
| 1905–06 | Essendon | 21 (8) |
| 1909 | University | 2 (0) |
| Total | | 23 (8) |
- ^{1} Playing statistics correct to the end of 1909.

Simon Fraser Jr. (25 August 1886 – 11 May 1919) was an Australian sportsman who was an Olympic rower and played high-level Australian rules football. In football he played with Essendon and University in the Victorian Football League (VFL). As a rower he represented Australia at the 1912 Stockholm Olympics and was a member of the first Australian eight to win the Grand Challenge Cup at the Henley Royal Regatta. In ice hockey he played for the Beavers Ice Hockey Club, one of the four founding teams in the newly founded Victorian Amateur Ice Hockey Association.

== Early life and sporting success ==
Fraser was the eldest son of the pastoralist and politician Sir Simon Fraser (1832–1919) and his second wife Anne (née Collins). His youngest brother Neville's son was Malcolm Fraser, who went on to become prime minister of Australia. He was educated at the Melbourne Grammar School, where he was a successful athlete, cricketer, footballer, and rower, being stroke of the first XIII in 1905 and Captain of Boats. That year he was a member of the school athletic team which won "The Argus" and "The Australasian" Challenge cup. He was also a lieutenant in the school cadet corps. In 1905 and 1906 he played 21 games for Essendon Football Club.

He entered the University of Melbourne in 1906, where he was a student at Trinity College. He was stroke of the Trinity College eight, as well as of the Melbourne University Boat Club eight, winning a University Blue in 1908 for rowing. Fraser graduated from Melbourne University with a Bachelor of Mining Engineering degree in 1911. Fraser was also an ice-skater and in 1908 he played ice hockey where he was part of the Beavers Ice Hockey Club, one of the 4 founding teams for the newly founded Victorian Amateur Ice Hockey Association. Six years later he married Phyllis Hammond-Clegg, herself an Australian Ladies Ice Skating champion.

== Rowing ==
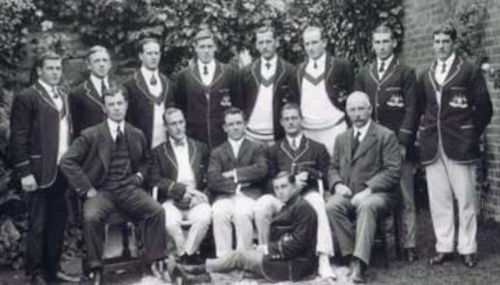
Fraser (backrow 2nd from left) with the 1912 Aust Olympic VIII, incl reserves & selectors

Fraser rowed in Melbourne University Boat Club eights which contested the Australian University Championships in 1908 and 1909. He was selected in the first Australian representative eight which rowed at the Henley Royal Regatta in July 1912 as a Sydney Rowing Club crew progressed through its match races to beat a Leander club eight in the final and win the 1912 Grand Challenge Cup. The two Victorians in the squad – Fraser and Harry Ross-Soden joined the Sydney Rowing Club to enable their Henley entry as a club crew and their families, together with the Victorian Rowing Association had been the principle providers of funds for the tour. That crew with one change then went on to the 1912 Summer Olympics in Stockholm where they competed as an Australasian entrant. With Fraser rowing in the two seat, they were beaten in the quarter-final by a Great British crew – the same Leander eight they had triumphed over at Henley a few weeks earlier.

== Personal life ==
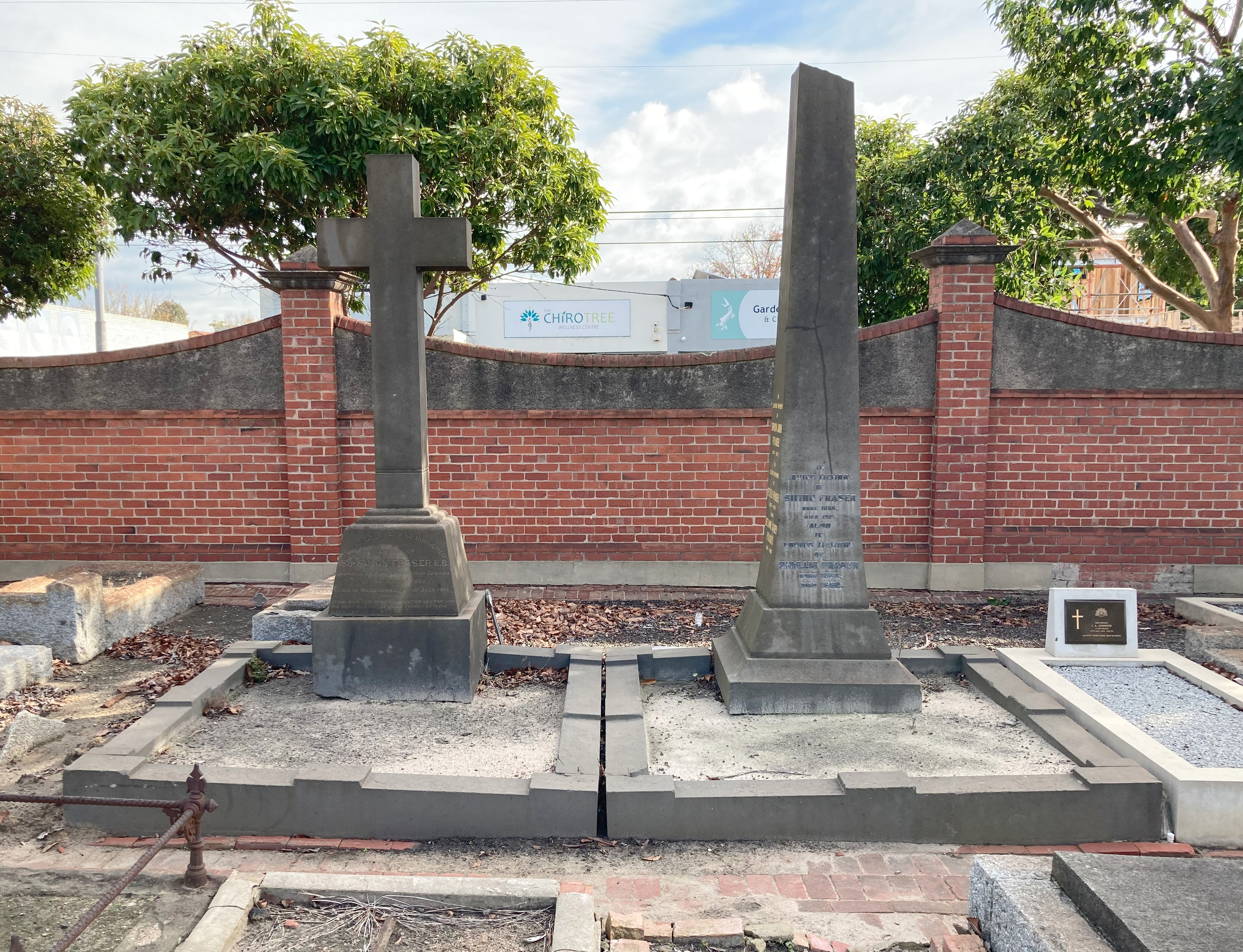
Graves of Fraser (right) and his father Simon Fraser Sr. (left) at Brighton General Cemetery

On his return to Australia Fraser managed his father's station called "Nyang" near Moulamein on the New South Wales/Victoria border. He died in 1919 aged 32 from pneumonic influenza at Penshurst, Victoria, after attending the Warrnambool races. He was buried at Brighton General Cemetery.

In 1914 he had married Phyllis Hammond-Clegg who in 1913, aged 21 became Australia's third NISA Ladies Ice Skating Champion. Phyllis survived him, with three young children. She continued to be known as Mrs. Phyllis Fraser for many years after her husband's death.

== Sources ==
- Holmesby, Russell & Main, Jim (2007). The Encyclopedia of AFL Footballers. 7th ed. Melbourne: Bas Publishing.
- Essendon Football Club profile
