= Hugh Ward (bacteriologist) =

Australian bacteriologist

Hugh Kingsley Ward MC (17 September 1887 – 22 November 1972) was an Australian bacteriologist. He was Bosch Professor of Bacteriology at the University of Sydney from 1935 to 1952. He was an Australian national champion rower who competed for Australasia at the 1912 Summer Olympics.

== Personal ==
Ward was born at Petersham, New South Wales on 17 September 1887. His father Frederick was editor of the Sydney Mail and then The Daily Telegraph. Ward was the youngest of eight children. In May 1927, he married librarian Constance Isabella Docker, daughter of NSW District Court judge Ernest Brougham Docker. Ward and his wife had a son and daughter. He died in Sydney Hospital on 22 November 1972.

== Education ==
Ward attended Sydney Grammar School. In 1910, he graduated from the University of Sydney with Bachelor of Medicine. In 1911, he awarded a Rhodes Scholarship at New College, Oxford. In 1913, he graduated with diplomas in anthropology and public health.

== Rowing ==
In 1909 Ward rowed in the Sydney University eight, which won the men's eight event at the Australian University Championships. In 1910, he stroked the New South Wales crew which won the men's eight at the annual Australian Interstate Regatta.

After he went up to Oxford, Ward rowed for New College against the Sydney Rowing Club at the 1912 Henley Royal Regatta. The Sydney eight won the Grand Challenge Cup. Ward replaced Keith Heritage in the Sydney eight, which went on to compete as an Australasian representative eight in the 1912 Summer Olympics Men's eight race and which was knocked out in their second match race - a quarter-final. He rowed for Oxford University in 1913 and 1914.

In 1967, the University of Sydney opened the HK Ward Gymnasium.

== Military ==
Ward was appointed lieutenant, Royal Army Medical Corps Special Reserve, on 5 August 1914. Ward arrived in France from England a week later. He was promoted to Captain in April 1915. In 1916, he was wounded in France and that year was awarded the Military Cross for attending to wounded men in the battlefield. In June 1917, Ward was taken as a prisoner at Nieuwpoort, Belgium. He received two bars in addition to his Military Cross.

== Medical career ==
In 1911, Ward was a Resident Medical Officer at Sydney Hospital. From 1923 to 1924, he was a Rockefeller Fellow at Harvard University. From 1926 to 1934, he was Assistant Professor of Bacteriology at Harvard University. During his time at Harvard University, Ward shared an apartment with John F. Enders, who was initially studying ancient Celtic philology. Ward's work in microbiology under Hans Zinsser fascinated Enders, ultimately inspiring him to shift his focus to microbiology—a decision that later led to his Nobel Prize-winning work on polio virus cultivation. In 1935, he returned to Sydney. He was Bosch Professor of Bacteriology at the University of Sydney until 1952. He is said to have inspired leading medical scientists Donald Metcalf, Gustav Nossal and Jacques Miller. From 1952 to 1969, he was a medical officer with the Red Cross Blood Transfusion Service.
