= Henry Wells (rowing) =

British coxswain

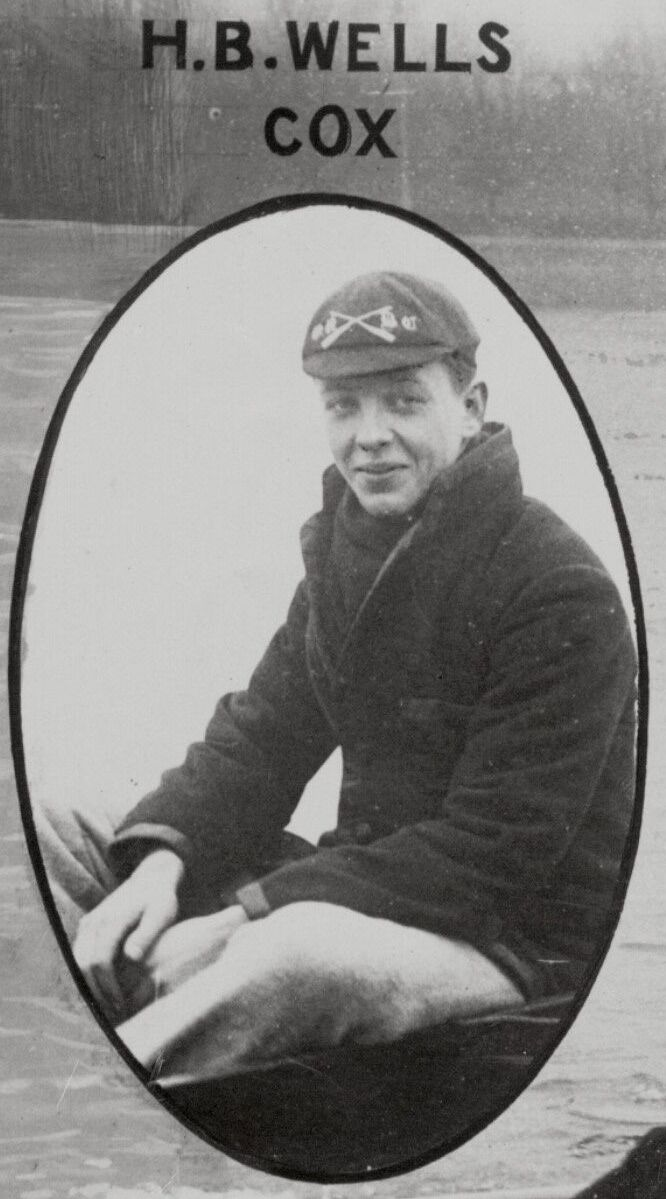

Medal record

Men's rowing

Representing Great Britain

Olympic Games
Gold medal – first place	1912 Stockholm	Eight

Henry Bensley Wells MBE (12 January 1891 – 4 July 1967) was an English judge and rowing coxswain who competed for Great Britain in the 1912 Summer Olympics.

Wells was educated at Winchester College and Magdalen College, Oxford. He coxed the Oxford boat in the Boat Race from 1911 to 1914. He joined Leander Club, and in 1912, he coxed the Leander eight, which won the gold medal for Great Britain rowing at the 1912 Summer Olympics. The Leander eight beat the crew from New College, Oxford by one length in the Olympic final in Stockholm.

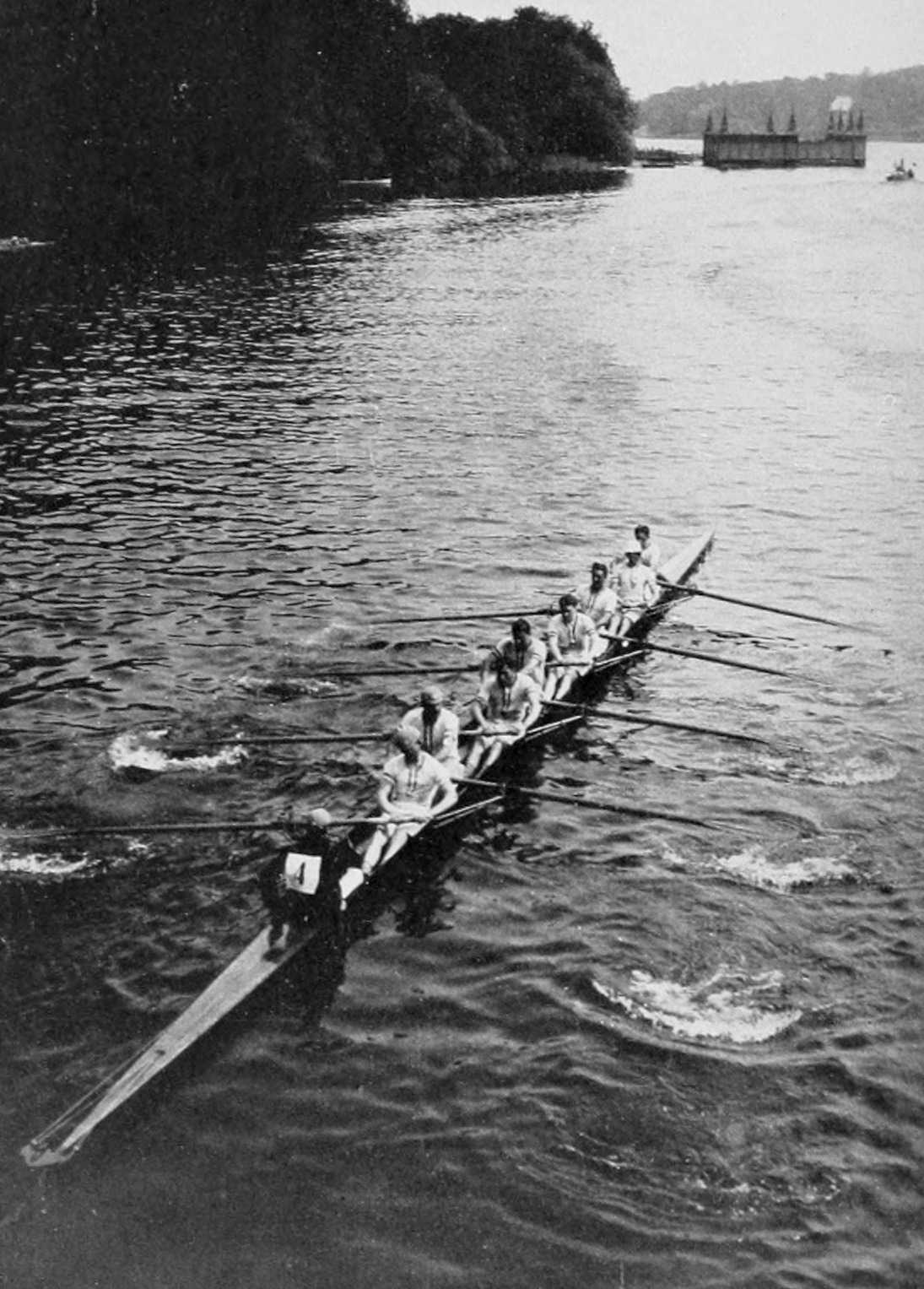
The British Leander Club eight – Wells coxing

Wells was called to the Bar by Gray’s Inn in 1914. On the outbreak of World War I, he joined the 6th London Brigade and was awarded the MBE in 1919. He was appointed a County Court Judge in 1934 and retired in 1958.

== See also ==
- List of Oxford University Boat Race crews
