= Stanley Garton =

British rower

Medal record

Men's rowing

Representing Great Britain

Olympic Games
Gold medal – first place	1912 Stockholm	Eight

Arthur Stanley Garton (31 March 1889 – 20 October 1948) was a British rower who competed in the 1912 Summer Olympics.

Garton was born in Worcester Park. He was educated at Eton College, where he was an outstanding member of the Eton crew and Magdalen College, Oxford. He rowed in the winning Oxford boats in the Boat Race in 1909, 1910 and 1911. He was also in the Magdalen boat that won the Grand Challenge Cup at Henley Royal Regatta in 1910 and 1911. He joined Leander Club, and in 1912, he was a member of the Leander eight, which won the gold medal for Great Britain rowing at the 1912 Summer Olympics.

As a member of the Leander crew, he won the Grand for the third time in 1913. He coached the Oxford eight in 1925 and 1930. He lived at Danesfield House, Marlow, Buckinghamshire.

Garton's daughter Jean married Sir Edward Imbert-Terry, 3rd Baronet and after his death Lionel Sackville-West, 6th Baron Sackville in 1982. Another daughter, Rosalind, married Richard Burnell, the 1948 Olympic gold medallist, in 1940. Their son, Peter Burnell, who was Garton's grandson, rowed for Oxford in 1962.

== See also ==
- List of Oxford University Boat Race crews
