= List of Oxford University Boat Race crews =

This is a list of the Oxford University crews who have competed in The Boat Race since its inception in 1829. A coxswain or oarsman earns their rowing Blue by rowing in the Boat Race.

Rowers are listed left to right in boat position from bow to stroke. The number following the rower indicates the rower's weight in stones and pounds.

== 1828–1854 ==
Year	Wins	Crew
1829	W	J Carter; J E Arbuthnot; J E Bates; C Wordsworth, 11.10; J J Toogood, 14.10; T Garnier; G B Moore, 12. 4; T Staniforth, 12. 0; Cox W R Fremantle, 8. 2
1836		G Carter, 10. 0; E Stephens, 10. 7; Sir W Baillie, 10. 7; T Harris, 12. 4; Sir J V Isham, 12. 0; J Pennefather, 12.10; W S Thomson, 13. 0; F L Moysey, 10. 6; Cox E W Davies, 10. 3
1839		S Lee, 10. 4; J Compton, 11. 5; S E Maberly, 11. 4; W J Garnett, 12.10; R G Walls, 13. 0; R Hobhouse, 12. 0; P L Powys, 12. 0; C Bewicke, 11. 5; Cox W Fooks, 10. 2
1840		J G Mountain, 11. 1; I J I Pocock, 11. 2; S E Maberly, 11. 4; W Rogers, 12.10; R G Walls, 12. 7; E Royds, 12. 4; G Meynell, 11.10; J J T Somers-Cocks, 11. 3; Cox W B Garnett, 9. 7
1841		R Bethell, 10. 6; E V Richards, 11. 2; J G Mountain, 10. 9; E Royds, 11.13; H W Hodgson, 11.10; W Lea, 11. 7; G Meynell, 11.11; J J T Somers-Cocks, 11. 4; Cox C B Wollaston, 9. 2
1842	W	F T McDougall 9. 8; Sir R Menzies 11. 3; E A Breedon 12. 4; W B Brewster 12.10; G D Bourne 13.12; J C Cox 11. 8; J Royds 11. 7; G E Hughes 11. 6; F N Menzies 10.12; A T W Shadwell 10. 4
1845		M Haggard 10. 3; W Chetwynd-Stapylton 10. 12; W H Milman 11. 0; H Lewis 11. 7; W Buckle 13. 12; F C Royds 11. 5; F M Wilson 12. 3; F E Tuke 12. 2; Cox F J Richards 10.10
1846		H S Polehampton 10. 9; E C Burton 11. 0; W U Heygate 11. 8; E H Penfold 11. 8; J W Conant 12. 4; F C Royds 11. 9; W Chetwynd-Stapylton 10.12; W H Milman 11. 0; Cox C J Soanes 9.13
1849 Mar		D Wauchope 10. 4; J W Chitty 11. 2; H H Tremayne 11. 5; E C Burton 11. 0; C H Steward 12. 0; A Mansfield 11. 8; E J Sykes 11. 0; W G Rich 10. 0; Cox C J Soanes 10. 8
1849 Dec	W	J Hornby 11. 8; W Houghton 11. 2; J Wodehouse 11. 7; J W Chitty 11. 9; J Aitken 12. 1; C H Steward 12. 2; E J Sykes 11. 2; W G Rich 10. 2; Cox R W Cotton 9. 0
1852	W	K Prescot 10.10; R Greenall 10.12; P H Nind 11. 2; R J Buller 12. 4; H Denne 12. 8; W Houghton 11. 8; W O Meade-King 11.11; J W Chitty 11. 7; Cox R W Cotton 9. 2
1854	W	W F Short 10. 5; A Hooke 11. 0; W Pinckney 11. 2; T H Blundell 11. 8; T A Hooper 11. 5; P H Nind 10.12; G L Mellish 11. 2; W O Meade-King 11. 8; Cox T H Marshall 10. 3

== 1856–1877 ==
1856–1877
Year	Result	Crew
1856		P Gurdon 10. 8; W F Stocken 10. 1; R I Salmon 10.10; A B Rocke 12. 8; R N Townsend 12. 8; A P Heywood-Lonsdale 11. 4; G Bennett 10.10; J T Thorley 9.12; Cox F W Elers 9. 2
1857	W	R W Risley 11. 3; P Gurdon 11. 0; J Arkell 10.12; R Martin 12. 1; W H Wood 11.13; E Warre 12. 3; A P Heywood-Lonsdale 12. 0; J T Thorley 10. 1; Cox F W Elers 9. 2
1858		R W Risley 11. 3; J Arkell 11. 3; C G Lane 11.10; W G G Austin 12. 7; E Lane 11.10; W H Wood 12. 0; E Warre 13. 2; J T Thorley 10. 3; Cox H S Walpole 9. 5
1859	W	H F Baxter 10.12; R F Clarke 11.13; C G Lane 11.10; Hon V Lawless 12. 3; G Morrison 13. 1; R W Risley 11. 2; G G T Thomas 11. 4; J Arkell 10.12; Cox A J Roberts 9. 1
1860		J N McQueen 11. 7; G Norsworthy 11. 0; T F Halsey 11.11; J F Young 12. 8; G Morrison 12.13; H F Baxter 11. 7; C I Strong 11. 2; R W Risley 11. 8; Cox A J Roberts 9. 9
1861	W	W Champneys 10.11; E B Merriman 10. 1; H E Meddlicott 12. 4; W Robertson 11. 3; G Morrison 12. 8; A R Poole 12. 3; H G Hopkins 10. 8; W M Hoare 10.10; Cox S O B Ridsdale 9. 0
1862	W	W B Woodgate 11. 6; O S Wynne 11. 3; W B R Jacobson 12. 4; R E L Burton 12. 5; A Morrison 12. 8; A R Poole 12. 5; C R Carr 11. 2; W M Hoare 11. 1; Cox F E Hopwood 7. 3
1863	W	R Shepherd, 11. 0; F H Kelly, 11. 5; W B R Jacobson, 12. 4; W B Woodgate, 11.11; A Morrison, 12. 4; W Awdry, 11. 4; C R Carr, 11. 3; W M Hoare, 11. 7; Cox F E Hopwood, 8. 4
1864	W	C P Roberts, 10. 9; W Awdry, 11. 4; F H Kelly, 11. 9; J C Parson, 12. 9; W B R Jacobson, 12. 3; A E Seymour, 11. 3; M Brown, 11. 3; D Pocklington, 11. 5; Cox C R W Tottenham, 7. 3
1865	W	R T Raikes, 11. 0; H P Senhouse, 11. 1; E F Henley, 12.13; G G Coventry, 11.12; A Morrison, 12. 6; T Wood, 12. 2; H Schneider, 11.10; M Brown, 11. 4; Cox C R W Tottenham, 7.13
1866	W	R T Raikes, 11. 0; F Crowder, 11.11; W L Freeman, 12. 7; F Willan, 12. 2; E F Henley, 13. 0; W W Wood, 12. 4; H P Senhouse, 11. 3; M Brown, 11. 5; Cox C R W Tottenham, 7.13
1867	W	W P Bowman, 10.11; J H Fish, 12, 1; E S Carter, 11.12; W W Wood, 12. 6; J C Tinne, 13. 4; F Crowder, 11.11; F Willan, 12. 3; R G Marsden, 11.11; Cox C R W Tottenham, 8. 8
1868	W	W D Benson, 10.13; A C Yarborough, 11. 8; R S Ross of Bladensburg, 11. 8; R G Marsden, 11.13; J C Tinne, 13. 7; F Willan, 12. 5; E S Carter, 11. 8; S D Darbishire, 11. 3; Cox C R W Tottenham, 8. 7
1869	W	S H Woodhouse, 10.13; R Tahourdin, 11.11; T S Baker, 12. 8; F Willan, 12. 2; J C Tinne, 13.10; A C Yarborough, 11.11; W D Benson, 11. 7; S D Darbishire, 11. 8; Cox F H Hall, 7. 7
1870		R W B Mirehouse, 11. 0; A G P Lewis, 11.2; T S Baker, 12. 9; J E Edwards-Moss,13. 0; F E H Payne, 12.10; S H Woodhouse, 11.4; W D Benson, 11.13; S D Darbishire; Cox F H Hall, 7. 7
1871		S H Woodhouse, 11. 6; E Giles, 11.13; T S Baker, 13. 3; E C Malan, 13. 1; J E Edwards-Moss, 12. 8; F E H Payne, 12. 9; J McClintock-Bunbury, 11. 8; R Lesley, 11.10; Cox F H Hall, 7.10
1872		J A Ornsby, 10.13; C C Knollys,10.12; F E H Payne, 12.12; A W Nicholson, 12. 2; E C Malan, 13. 5; R S Mitchison, 12. 2; R Lesley, 11.11; T H A Houblon, 10. 4; Cox F H Hall, 8, 0
1873		C C Knollys, 10.11; J B Little, 10.11; M G Farrer, 11.13; A W Nicholson, 12. 5; R S Mitchison, 12. 2; W E Sherwood, 11. 1; J A Ornsby, 11. 3; F T Dowding, 11. 0; Cox G Frewer, 7.10
1874		H W Benson, 11. 0; J S Sinclair, 11. 5½; W E Sherwood, 11. 8; A R Harding 11. 1½; J Williams, 13. 0½; A W Nicholson, 12.10; H J Stayner, 11.10½; J P Way, 10. 9; Cox W F A Lambert, 7. 2
1875	W	H McD Courtney, 10.12; H P Marriott, 11.12; J E Bankes, 11.11; A M Mitchison, 12.12; H J Stayner, 12. 2; J M Boustead, 12. 4; T C Edwards-Moss, 12. 5; J P Way, 10.11; Cox E O Hopwood, 8. 3
1876		H McD Courtney, 10.12; F R Mercer, 11. 6; W H Hobart, 11.11; A M Mitchison, 13. 0; J M Boustead, 12. 6; H J Stayner, 12. 2; H P Marriott, 11. 9; T C Edwards-Moss, 12. 3; Cox W D Craven, 7. 6
1877	DH	D J Cowles, 11. 3½; J M Boustead,12. 8; H Pelham, 12. 7; W H Grenfell, 12. 8; H J Stayner, 12. 6¼; A J Mulholland, 12. 5¾; T C Edwards-Moss, 12. 0; H P Marriott, 12. 0; Cox F M Beaumont, 7. 0

== 1878–1899 ==
1878–1899
Year	Wins	Crew
1878	W	W A Ellison, 10.13; D J Cowles, 11. 4¾; H B Southwell, 12. 8½; W H Grenfell, 12.10½; H Pelham, 12.11; G F Burgess, 13. 3½; T C Edwards-Moss, 12. 3; H P Marriott, 12. 2½; Cox F M Beaumont, 7. 0½
1879		J H T Wharton, 11. 4; H M Robinson, 11. 1; H W Disney, 12. 5½; H B Southwell, 12. 9; T C Burrowes, 12. 9; G D Rowe, 11.12; W H Hobart, 11.11; H P Marriott, 12. 3; Cox F M Beaumont, 7. 5
1880	W	R H Poole, 10. 6; D E Brown, 12. 6; F M Harbreaves, 12. 2; H B Southwell, 13. 0; R S Kindersley, 12. 8; G D Rowe, 12. 3; J H T Wharton, 11.10; L R West, 11. 1; Cox C W Hunt, 7. 5
1881	W	R H J Poole, 10.11; R A Pinckney, 11. 3; A R Paterson, 12. 7; E Buck, 11.11; R S Kindersley, 13. 3; D E Brown, 12. 7; J H T Wharton, 11.10; L R West, 11. 0½; Cox E H Lyon, 7. 0
1882	W	G C Bourne, 10.13; R S de Haviland, 11. 1½; G S Fort, 12. 3½; A R Paterson, 12.12; R S Kindersley, 13. 4½; E Buck, 12. 0; D E Brown, 12. 6; A H Higgins, 9. 6½; Cox E H Lyon, 7.12
1883	W	G C Bourne, 10.11½; R S de Havilland, 11. 4; G S Fort, 12. 0; E L Puxley, 12. 6½; D H McLean, 13. 2½; A R Paterson, 13. 1½; G Q Roberts, 11. 1½; L R West, 11. 0; Cox E H Lyon, 8. 1
1884		A G Short, 11. 2; L Stock, 11. 0; C R Carter, 12.10; P W Taylor, 13. 1; D H McLean, 12.11½; A R Paterson, 13. 4; W C Blandy, 10.13; W D B Curry, 10. 4; Cox F J Humphreys, 7. 6
1885	W	W S Unwin, 10.10½; J S Clemens, 11. 9; P W Taylor, 13. 6½; C R Carter, 13. 2; H McLean, 12.12; F O Wethered, 12. 6½; D H McLean, 13. 1½; H Girdlestone, 12. 7; Cox F J Humphreys, 8. 2
1886		W S Unwin, 10.11; L S R Byrne, 11.11½; W St L Robertson, 11. 7½; C R Carter, 13. 0½; H McLean, 12.12; F O Wethered,12. 6; D H McLean, 13. 0; H Girdlestone, 12. 9¼; Cox W E Maynard, 7.12
1887		W F C Holland, 10. 9; G Nickalls, 12. 1; S G Williams, 12. 5; H R Parker, 13. 3; H McLean, 12. 8½; F O Wethered, 12. 5; D H McLean, 12. 9; A F Titherington, 12. 2; Cox L J Clarke, 7. 9
1888		W F C Holland, 11. 0; A P Parker, 11.11; M E Bradford, 11. 9; S R Fothergill, 12.10; H Cross, 13. 0½; H R Parker, 13. 5; G Nickalls, 12. 4; L Frere, 10. 0½; Cox A H Stewart, 7.13½
1889		H E L Puxley, 11. 8½; R P P Rowe, 11. 9; T A Cook, 12. 2; F C Drake, 12.12; Lord Ampthill, 12.11; H R Parker, 13.11; G Nickalls, 12. 5; W F C Holland, 10.12; Cox J P H Heywood-Lonsdale, 8. 2½
1890	W	W F C Holland, 11. 1; P D Tuckett, 11. 2; H E L Puxley, 11. 7; C H St J Hornby, 11. 7; Lord Ampthill, 13. 5; G Nickalls, 12.10; R P P Rowe, 11.10; W A L Fletcher, 13. 0; Cox J P H Heywood-Lonsdale, 8. 0
1891	W	W M Poole, 10. 7½; R P P Rowe, 11.11; V Nickalls, 12. 9; G Nickalls, 12. 5; F Wilkinson, 13. 8; Lord Ampthill, 13. 5; W A L Fletcher, 13. 2; C W Kent, 10.11; Cox J P H Heywood-Lonsdale, 8. 0
1892	W	H B Cotton, 9.12; J A Ford, 11.11; W A S Hewett, 12. 2; F E Robeson, 13. 7½; V Nickalls, 13. 2; W A L Fletcher, 13. 8; R P P Rowe, 12. 0; C.M. Pitman, 11.12½; Cox J P H Heywood-Lonsdale, 8. 7
1893	W	H B Cotton, 9.12; J A Ford, 11.13; J A Morrison, 12. 4½; H Legge, 12.13½; V Nickalls, 13. 4; W A L Fletcher, 13. 8½; C.M. Pitman, 12. 0½; M C Pilkington, 11.11; Cox L Portman, 7. 7
1894	W	H B Cotton, 9.13; M C Pilkington, 12. 4; W Burton Stewart, 13. 5; J A Morrison, 12. 5; E G Tew, 13. 7; T H E Stretch, 12. 4; W E Crum, 12. 0; C.M. Pitman, 12. 0; Cox L Portman, 8. 7
1895	W	H B Cotton, 9.13; M C Pilkington, 12. 4; C K Philips, 11.12; T H E Stretch, 12. 4; W Burton Stewart, 13. 7½; C D Burnell, 13. 0½; W E Crum, 12. 2; C.M. Pitman, 12. 0; Cox C P Serocold, 8. 1
1896	W	J J J de Knoop, 11. 1½; C K Philips, 12. 5½; E C Sherwood, 12.12; C D Burnell, 13.10; E R Balfour, 13. 6; R Carr, 12. 8½; W E Crum, 12. 3; H G Gold, 11. 5½; Cox H R K Pechell, 7.13½
1897	W	J J J de Knoop, 11. 6; G O C Edwards, 12. 1; C K Philips, 12. 0½; C D Burnell, 13. 9; E R Balfour, 13. 8½; R Carr, 12.11½; W E Crum, 12. 3; H G Gold, 11.11; Cox H R K Pechell, 8. 0½
1898	W	R O Pitman, 11. 0; G O C Edwards, 12. 7½; C K Philips, 12. 0½; F W Warre, 12.12; C D Burnell, 14. 0; R Carr, 13. 1; A T Herbert, 12.10½; H G Gold, 11.10½; Cox H R K Pechell, 8. 1
1899		R O Pitman, 10.10; C W Tomkinson, 12. 0; A H D Steele, 12.11½; H J Hale, 12.9½; C E Johnston, 13. 0; F W Warre, 12.13; A T Herbert, 12.13; H G Gold, 11.11½; Cox G S Maclagan, 8. 1

== 1900–1914 ==
1900–1914
Year	Wins	Crew
1900		H H Dutton, 10. 9½, R H Culme-Seymour, 11. 7½, C E Johnston, 12.12, C W Tomkinson, 11.13, Viscount Grimston, 13.10¾, H B Kittermaster, 14. 6, T B Etherington-Smith, 11. 5¾, C P Rowley, 11.12½, G S Maclagan, 8. 5
1901	W	F O J Huntley, 11. 6½; H C de J Du Vallon, 12. 4½; J Younger, 12.12; A de L Long, 12.12; H J Hale, 12.11; F W Warre, 12. 8½; T B Etherington-Smith, 11. 5½; R H Culme-Seymour 11. 9½; Cox G S Maclagan, 8. 5
1902		G C Drinkwater, 11. 7; D Milburn, 12. 4½; J Younger, 12.12½; H J Hale, 13. 1; J G Milburn, 13. 3½; A de L Long, 13. 0¼; H W Adams, 12. 1½; F O J Huntley, 11. 7½; Cox G S Maclagan, 8. 5
1903		C A Willis, 11. 4; A K Graham, 10.12; A de L Long, 12.11; F S Kelly, 11.12; H W Adams, 12. 1; D Milburn, 12.10; G C Drinkwater, 11.11; E G Monier-Williams, 12. 5; Cox F T H Eyre, 6. 6
1904		T G Brocklebank, 10. 9¼; R W Somers-Smith, 10. 8; A J S H Hales, 12. 3¾; H W Jelf, 12. 6; P C Underhill, 12. 9; A R Balfour, 12. 0; E P Evans, 13. 0½; A K Graham, 11. 0; Cox E C T Warner, 7.10
1905	W	R W Somers-Smith, 10. 9; H M Farrer, 11. 5; A J S H Hales, 12. 0; A R Balfour, 12. 0; L E Jones, 13. 9½; E P Evans, 13. 2½; A K Graham, 13. 3½; H C Bucknall, 11. 1½; Cox L P Stedall, 8. 0
1906		G M A Graham, 10.13; C H Illingworth, 11.13; J Dewar, 12. 4½; L E Jones, 13.12; A G Kirby,13. 8; E P Evans, 13. 6; A C Gladstone, 10. 7½; H C Bucknall, 11. 3; Cox L P Stedall, 8. 5
1907		W T Heard, 11. 0; H C Bucknall, 11. 8; G E Hope, 12.13; R M Peat, 11.11; J A Gillan, 12. 7; A G Kirby, 13.10; E H L Southwell, 12. 1; A C Gladstone, 11. 0; Cox W F Donkin, 8. 5
1908		Hon R P Stanmore, 9.10; C R Cudmore, 12. 0; E H L Southwell, 12. 3; A E Kitchin, 12. 7; A G Kirby, 13. 7; A McCulloch, 12. 9½; H R Barker, 12. 0½; A C Gladstone, 11.13½; Cox A W F Donkin, 8. 7
1909	W	A C Gladstone, 11. 6½; H R Barker, 12. 5; C R Cudmore,12. 4; A S Garton, 13. 8½; D Mackinnon, 13. 3½; J A Gillan, 13. 1; A G Kirby, 13.10½; R C Bourne, 10.13; Cox A W F Donkin, 8. 8
1910	W	M B Higgins, 11. 6½; R H Owen, 12. 6½; N Field, 13. 8½; E Majolier, 13. 0½; D Mackinnon, 13. 2½; A S Garton, 13.11; P Fleming, 12. 6; R C Bourne, 11. 0; Cox A W F Donkin
1911	W	C E Tinne, 12. 2½; L G Wormwald, 12. 7; R E Burgess, 12. 2½; E J H V Millington-Drake, 12. 8; C W B Littlejohn, 12.13½; A S Garton, 13. 8;D Mackinnon, 13. 5½; R C Bourne, 10.13; cox H B Wells, 8. 5
1912	W	F A H Pitman, 11.11½; C E Tinne, 12. 4; L G Wormwald, 12. 9; E D Horsfall, 12. 6; A H M Wedderburn, 13.11; A F R Wiggins, 12.11; C W B Littlejohn, 12. 8; R C Bourne, 11. 0½; H B Wells, 8. 9
1913		E R Burgess, 11.12; C L Baillieu, 12. 3½; R P Hankinson, 11.13½; H K Ward, 12.10½; A H M Wedderburn, 13.10½; A F R Wiggins, 12.13½; L G Wormwald, 12.10½; E D Horsfall, 12. 6; H B Wells, 8. 7
1914		R W Fletcher, 11.10½; B Burdekin, 12. 4; H K Ward, 12. 9; E D Horsfall, 12. 7½; J B Kindersley, 12. 9½; A F R Wiggins, 12.13; G W Titherington, 12.10; F A H Pitman, 11.12½; H B Wells, 8. 8

== 1920–1939 ==
1920–1939
Year	Wins	Crew
1920		S Earl, 12. 6½; N H MacNeil, 12. 0; A T M Durand, 13. 0; A C Hill, 13. 8½; D T Raikes, 13. 7; W E C James, 13. 5½; H W B Cairns, 12. 0; M H Ellis, 10. 4½; Cox W H Porritt, 8. 9½
1921		M H Ellis, 10.6; P C Mallam, 11. 6¾; S Earl, 12. 5; F B Lothrop, 13. 5; W E C James, 13. 6; R S C Lucas, 13. 7½; G O Nickalls, 12. 6; D T Raikes, 13. 4; Cox W H Porritt, 8. 8
1922		C Mallam, 11. 6; A C Irvine, 12. 8; S Earl, 12. 6½; J E Pedder, 12. 9; G O Nickalls, 12. 8; D T Raikes, 13. 6½; G Milling, 11.10; A V Campbell, 11. 5½; Cox W H Porritt, 8.10
1923	W	P C Mallam, 11.12; P R Wace, 12. 6½; A C Irvine, 12.10½; R K Kane, 13. 9½; G J Mower-White, 13.11½; J E Pedder, 13. 3½; G O Nickalls, 12.12; W P Mellen, 10.12; Cox G D Clapperton, 7.11
1924		P C Mallam, 11.11½; P R Wace, 12. 1½; W F Godden, 12.12; R E Eason, 13. 1½; G J Mower-White, 13. 9½; J E Pedder, 13. 2; G E G Gadsden, 11.10; W P Mellen, 10.10; Cox G D Clapperton, 7. 9½
1925	Sank	A H Franklin, 11. 9½; C E Pitman, 11. 7; E C T Edwards, 12. 3½; M R Grant, 11. 8; G J Mower-White, 13. 4; J D W Thomson, 12.10; G E G Gadsden, 11.12; A V Campbell, 11. 9; Cox R Knox, 8. 2
1926		P W Murray-Threipland, 12. 5; T W Shaw, 12. 7½; G H Crawford, 13. 0; W Rathbone, 13. 9; H R A Edwards, 13. 5; J D W Thomson, 13. 5½; E C T Edwards, 12. 9; C E Pitman, 11. 1; Cox Sir J H Croft, 8. 5½
1927		N E Whiting 11. 9; P Johnson, 11.11; E C T Edwards, 12.10; J D W Thomson, 13. 6; W Rathbone, 13.13; H T Kingsbury, 14. 2; T W Shaw, 12. 7; A M Hankin, 10.11; Cox Sir J H Croft, 8.12
1928		M C Graham, 11. 3; T W Shaw, 12.10; N E Whiting, 11.11; H C Morphett, 12. 3; G M Brander, 13. 9; G E Godber, 12.12; P W Murray-Threipland, 12.12; W S Llewellyn, 12. 3; Cox Sir J H Croft, 9. 4
1929		P D Barr, 11. 5; G E Godber, 12 4½; C F S W Juel-Brockdorff, 12.12; J M Macdonald, 12.12½; H C Morphett, 12. 4; J A Ingles, 13.10; D E Tinne, 12. 0; A Graham, 11. 2½; Cox G V Stopford, 8.10
1930		M J Waterhouse, 12. 8; R V Low, 12. 2½; N K Hutton, 12.11; C M Johnston, 12.11; H R A Edwards, 13. 6; L Clive, 13. 0½[ D E Tinne, 12. 1; C F Martineau, 10.13; Cox H A G Durbridge 8.11
1931		W L Garstang, 11. 2; G M L Smith, 11.11; D E Tinne, 12. 4; C M Johnston, 12. 9; R A J Poole, 13. 2; L Clive, 13. 2½; W D C Erskine-Crum, 12. 1½; W G Holdsworth, 11.10½; Cox E R Edmett, 8. 0
1932		G A Ellison, 11. 8½; G M L Smith, 11. 9; J de R Kent, 11. 8½; C M Johnston, 12. 4½; W D C Erskine-Crum, 12. 6; R A J Poole, 13. 2½; W H Migotti, 11. 5½; C A Chawyck-Healey, 11. 6¼; Cox T E Pritchard, 8. 2
1933		W H Migotti, 11.11½; M H Mosley, 12. 0¼; W D C Erskine-Crum, 11. 9½; J M Couchman, 12. 9; P Hogg, 12. 9; P R S Bankes, 13.12; G A Ellison, 11.12½; R W G Holdsworth, 11.13¼; Cox C Komarakul-na-Nagara, 8. 4½
1934		W H Migotti, 11.11½; R W G Holdsworth, 11.13¾; P Hogg, 12.13¾; J M Couchman, 13. 3¼; P R S Banks, 14. 9; J H Lascelles, 11.12½; G I F Thompson, 12. 0½; A V Sutcliffe, 14. 2; Cox C G F Bryan, 7.13
1935		R Hope, 12. 2; D M de R Winser, 11. 9½; E E D Tomlin, 12. 5; P R S Bankes, 14. 3; D R B Mynors, 13. 0; J M Couchman, 12.13½; B J Sciortino, 12.10; A V Sutcliffe, 14. 5; Cox C G F Bryan, 7.11
1936		M G C Ashby, 12. 0; J S Lewes, 12. 7½; K V Garside, 12.12; S R C Wood, 12. 7; B J Sciortino, 12.11; J D Sturrock, 14. 1½; J C Cherry, 13. 7; D M de R Winser, 11.12; Cox M A Kirke, 8. 7
1937	W	M G C Ashby, 12. 4; D M de R Winser, 12. 0; R R Stewart, 13. 0; R G Rowe, 12.11; J P Burrough, 13. 7; J D Sturrock, 14. 4; J C Cherry, 13. 11; A B Hodgson, 12. 2; Cox G J P Merrifield, 7.11
1938	W	J L Garton, 11.12; H M Young, 12.12; R R Stewart, 12.13; H A W Forbes, 13. 2; J P Burrough, 13. 7; F A L Waldron, 13.10; J C Cherry, 13.12; A B Hodgson, 12. 0; Cox G J P Merifield, 8. 1
1939		G Huse, 12. 7; J L Garton, 11. 7; A G Slemeck, 13. 1; R R Stewart, 13. 4; R D Burnell, 14. 1½; F A L Waldron, 14. 4; H A W Forbes, 13. 5; J R Bingham, 11. 2; Cox H P V Massey, 5 .2

== 1940–1945 unofficial wartime races ==
1940–1945
Year	Wins	Crew
1940		J E Tickler, 11. 3; J C B Deakin, 10. 6; C E L Thomson, 12. 2; E de V Bolton, 11. 10; G Hse, 12. 10; R D Hill, 12. 12; A Tyser, 12. 10; P L Fanning, 10. 3; Cox H D Hicks, 9. 4
1943	W	D G Jamison; G B Rooke; J M H Brooks; W Whitechurch; R J Lowry; A J A Gillan; T H S Burns; F A de Hamel; Cox A G C Shattock
1944	W	D G Jamison, 11. 7; M E Whitworth-Jones, 10. 11; J M H Brooks, 11. 4; J R L Carstairs, 12. 6; M L H Lee, 11. 11; R T Warwick, 11. 0; G N Poynter, 12. 2; S A de Hamel, 11. 13; Cox R Ebsworth Snow, 9. 6
1945		D W J McIlroy, 11. 3; J E Von Bergen, 11. 1; I O Carlisle, 10. 13; D G Robertson Campbell, 12. 6½; M L H Lee, 12. 0½; R T Warwick, 11. 1; J R L Carstairs, 12. 6; D G Jamison, 12. 0½; Cox R E Ebsworth Snow, 9. 8

== 1946–1970 ==
1946–1970
Year	Wins	Crew
1946	W	R M T Raikes, 11. 2; R T Turner, 11. 0; J M Barrie, 12. 7; R M A Bourne, 11.13; J R L Carstairs, 12. 9; J R W Gleave, 12. 4; P N Brodie, 11. 7; A J R Purssell, 11.13; Cox R Ebsworth, 9. 1
1947		D G Jamison, 11. 9½; P H Mathews, 11.11; D A M Mckay, 13. 3; T D Raikes, 12. 3; J R W Gleave, 12. 5; R M A Bourne, 11. 4; P N Brodie, 11. 4; A J R Purssell, 11.12; Cox A Palgrave-Brown, 8.10
1948		G C Fisk, 12. 1½; J R W Gleave, 12. 7; A D Rowe, 12.12; W W Woodward, 13. 3½; R A Noel, 12.13½; R L Arundel, 14. 4; P N Brodie, 11. 8; A J R Purssell, 11.11½; Cox R G B Faulkner, 9. 0
1949		G C Fisk, 11. 9½; A J M Cavenagh, 11. 1; W J H Leckie, 12.12; R L Arundel, 14. 0; A D Rowe, 12.11½; T D Raikes, 12.10½; J M Clay, 12.12½; C G V Davidge, 12.13; Cox A Palgrave-Brown, 8. 9
1950		J G C Blacker, 12. 2; P Gladstone, 12.11; H J Renton, 12. 4; J M Clay, 12. 7½; G C Fisk, 11.10½; J Hayes, 13. 0; D N Callender, 12. 4; A J M Cavenagh, 11. 3; Cox J E C Hinchliffe, 8. 6
1951		J F E Smith, 11.11; A J Smith, 12.11; H J Renton, 13. 1½; L A F Stokes, 13. 3; M J Hawkes, 12.11½; C G Turner, 14. 6; D N Callender, 12. 6½; C G V Davidge, 13. 7½; Cox G Carver, 8. 7
1952	W	N W Sanders, 10. 7; P Gladstone, 12.12; C D Milling, 12. 1; L A F Stokes, 13. 0; M L Thomas, 13. 6; K H Keniston, 13. 6; H M C Quick, 13. 4; C G V Davidge, 12. 7; Cox D R Glynne-Jones, 8.12
1953		R A Byatt, 12. 4; A J Smith, 12. 9; J M Wilson, 13. 3; E C B Hammond, 13. 2; M L Thomas, 13.10; D T H Davenport, 13. 1; H M C Quick, 13. 5; J S Howles, 12. 0; Cox W R Marsh, 8.10
1954	W	R A Wheadon, 11.13; E V Vine, 12. 0; J A Gobbo, 12. 9; R D T Raikes, 12. 6; H M C Quick, 13.12; J G McLeod, 12. 1; E O G Pain, 12. 0; J J H Harrison, 11. 9; Cox W R Marsh, 8.12
1955		J A Gobbo, 12.10; E V Vine, 11.13; J M Wilson, 13. 5; D P Wells, 13. 2; R D T Raikes, 12. 3; J McLeod, 12.10; E O G Pain, 12. 0; G Sorrell, 11.12; Cox I A Watson, 9. 3
1956		E V Vine, 11.12; J G McLeod, 12. 0; N Paine, 12. 0; K L Mason, 12. 4; R Barrett, 14. 5; D A Cross, 13. 4; R H Carnegie, 13. 6; B S Mawer, 12. 0; Cox B E B K Venner, 9. 2
1957		G Sorrell, 12. 1; S F A Miskin, 12. 8; R L Howard, 13. 5; A H Stearns, 13.12; P F Barnard, 14. 3; R Barrett, 14. 5; R H Carnegie, 13.10; K L Mason, 11. 9; Cox A Said, 7.11
1958		G Sorrell, 11.13; M J W Hall, 12. 5; J H Ducker, 12.13; S F A Miskin, 12.13; F D M Badcock, 13. 3; R Rubin, 14. 8; J L Fage, 12.13; D C R Edwards, 13. 2; Cox J G Rowbotham, 9. 0
1959	W	S C H Douglas-Mann, 12. 5; A T Lindsay, 12. 8; R L Howard, 13.10; D C Rutherford, 13. 0; J L Fage, 13. 3; D C R Edwards, 13. 2; D W Shaw, 13. 0; J R H Lander, 12. 4; Cox J G Rowbotham. 9. 1
1960	W	R C I Bate, 12. 5; R L S Fishlock, 12. 0; T S Swayze, 13. 2; A T Lindsay, 12.10; I L Elliott, 13. 8; D C Rutherford, 12.12; J R Chester, 12. 5; C M Davis, 12. 6; Cox P J Reynolds, 8. 4
1961		R C I Bate, 12. 5; C P M Gomm, 12.12; J O B Sewall, 13. 4; I L Elliott, 13. 5; J C D Sherratt, 12.12; G V Cooper, 13. 0; J R Chester, 12. 8; C M Davis, 12. 7; Cox P J Reynolds, 8. 4
1962		N D Tinné, 12. 7; D D S Skailes, 13. 4; J Y Scarlett, 13.10; R A Morton, 13. 8; J C D Sherratt, 13. 4; T W Tennant, 13.12; P C D Burnell, 12.13; C M Davis, 12. 6; Cox C M Strong, 8. 6
1963	W	S R Morris, 11.11; N V Bevan, 12.11; R A Morton, 13. 9; M Q Morland, 13. 7; R C T Mead, 13. 7; D D S Skailes, 13. 6; P A V Roff, 12. 9; C D Spencer, 12.11; Cox C M Strong, 8. 13
1964		J Leigh-Wood, 12. 3; D W Steel, 13. 7; D W A Cox, 13. 7; M Q Morland, 14. 6; R C T Mead, 14. 0; D D S Skailes, 14. 3; D G Bray, 13. 1; D C Spencer; Cox M J Leigh, 8.12
1965	W	S R Morris, 12. 8; D J Mills, 13. 8; R D Clegg, 12.12; M Q Morland, 13. 8; W R Fink, 13. 2; H W Howell, 14. 5; D C Spencer, 13. 0; E S Trippe, 13. 5; Cox M J Leigh, 9. 0
1966	W	R A D Freeman, 13. 0; R D Clegg, 13. 3; F C Carr, 13. 4; C H Freeman, 14. 3; J K Mullard, 13. 7; P G Tuke, 13.11; E C Meyer, 13. 4; M S Kennard, 12.11; Cox J B Rogers, 9. 1
1967	W	J R Bockstoce, 14. 0; M S Kennard, 13. 0; C H Freeman, 14. 0; J E Jensen, 15. 4; J K Mullard, 13.10; C I Blackwall, 13. 6; D Topolski, 11.13; P G Saltmarsh, 14. 0; Cox P D Miller, 9. 6
1968		D Topolski; M S Kennard, 13. 1½; J P W Hawksley, 12. 6; D G C Thomson, 13.12; P G Saltmarsh, 13. 6; J R Bockstoce, 14. 3; W R Fink, 13. 5; P C Prichard, 12.13; Cox A W Painter, 8. 2
1969		F J L Dale, 13. 4; K B Gee, 12. 4; D M Higgs, 13. 5; H P Matheson, 14. 8; J M Duncan, 13.10; W R C Lonsdale, 13.10; N D C Tee, 12. 0; P G Saltmarsh, 13.12; Cox A T Calvert, 9. 0
1970		R J D Gee, 13. 8; J K G Dart, 12.10; D M Higgs, 13. 9; S E Wilmer, 13.11; F J L Dale, 13.11; A J Hall, 15. 7; N D C Tee, 12. 4; W R C Lonsdale, 13.10; Cox A T Calvert, 8.12

== 1971–1999 ==
1971–1999
Year	Wins	Crew
1971		S D Hunt, 12.10; K Bolshaw, 12.11; S D Nevin, 13. 8; C R W Parish, 13.10; D R d'A Willis, 15. 0; A J Hall, 14.13; F J L Dale, 13. 3; J P W Hawksley, 12.10; Cox M T Eastman, 8.11
1972		M A Margarey, 13. 8; K Bolshaw, 12.11; D R d'A Willis, 14.12; A J Hall, 15. 3; D R Payne, 12.10; J P W Hawksley, 12.12; Hon P D E M Moncrieffe, 11. 6; M G C T Baines, 12. 3; Cox E Yalouris, 8.12
1973		R G A Westlake, 12.13; J S Ollivant, 12. 3; M R Magarey, 14. 1; P D P Angier, 11.13; S G Irving, 13. 8; A J Hall, 14.13; D R Payne, 12.12; D R Sawyier, 13. 8; Cox E Yalouris, 8.10
1974	W	N D C Tee, 12. 1; G S Innes, 13. 2; D D Rendel, 13.10; S D Nevin, 13.13; G P G Stoddart, 13. 0; P J Marsden, 13. 6; D R Payne, 13. 5; D R Sawyier, 14. 2; Cox G E Morris, 8.12
1975		A G H Baird, 13. 1; M G C Harris, 11. 8; D R H Beak, 13. 2; C J A N Money-Coutts, 14. 7; J E Hutchings, 14. 2; R S Mason, 14. 1; N D C Tee, 11. 8; G S Innes, 13. 7; Cox J N Calvert, 8. 2
1976	W	D R H Beak, 13. 6; G S Innes, 13.10; A D Edwards, 14. 0; R S Mason, 14. 6; S G H PLunkett, 16. 5; K C Brown, 14. 5; A J Wiggins, 13. 5; A G H Baird, 12.10; Cox J N Calvert, 9. 4
1977	W	P S T Wright, 12.11; G E G Vardey, 12.10; M M Moran, 14. 4; R S Mason, 14. 8; C J A N Money-Coutts, 15. 2; A W Shealy, 14. 6; A J Wiggins, 13. 3; A G Michelmore, 12. 3; Cox C B Moynihan, 7. 9
1978	W	T J Sutton, 14. 2; R A Crockford, 13. 2; J R Crawford, 14. 0; N B Rankov, 14. 3; M M Moran, 14. 2; A W Shealy, 14. 2; J W Wood, 12.10; A G Michelmore, 12. 3; Cox J Fail, 7.13
1979	W	P J Head, 12. 4; R A Crockford, 13. 4; R J Moore, 13. 3; N B Rankov, 14. 5; J R Crawford, 14. 0; C J Mahoney, 13. 4; A J Wiggins, 13. 5; M J Diserens, 12. 9; Cox C P Berners-Lee, 7. 9
1980	W	S R W Francis, 13.12; N A Conington, 13. 0; M D Andrews, 14. 0½; J L Bland, 13.11; N B Rankov, 14. 3; C J Mahoney, 13. 6; T C M Barry, 13. 4½; M J Diserens, 12.13; Cox J S Mead, 8. 3½
1981	W	P J Head, 12. 6; N A Conington, 12.10; R P Yonge, 14. 4; R P Emerton, 13. 1; N B Rankov, 14. 5; C J Mahoney, 13. 8; M D Andrews, 14. 1; J L Bland, 14. 1; Cox Sue Brown, 6. 8
1982	W	N A Conington, 12.10; G R N Holland, 13.12; H E Clay, 14. 2; R P Yonge, 14. 8; N B Rankov, 14.12; S J L Foster, 13.11; A K Kirkpatrick, 14. 8; R C Clay, 13. 6; Cox Sue Brown, 6.11
1983	W	JL Bland, H E Clay, J M Evans, M. Evans, S E Higgins, G R D Jones, H E Lang, N B Rankov, R P Yonge
1984	W	R R Clay, M. Evans, J. M. Evans, G R D Jones, W J Lang, S R Lesser, C J B Long, D M Rose, J A G H Stewart
1985	W	G J Cartledge (bow) C L Richmond B M Philp A M S Thomas P M Hare G R D Jones W J Lang F M Reininger (stroke) S R Lesser (cox)
1986		C G H Clark M R Dunstan A S Green G R D Jones G A Livingston D H M Macdonald B M Philp G R Screaton A M S Thomas
1987	W	H M Pelham, 13. 9½; P A Gish, 14. 0; A D Ward, 13. 9; P Gleeson, 14. 12; R A Hull, 14. 7½; D H M Macdonald, 13. 13; T A D Cadoux-Hudson, 14. 6; G B Stewart, 16. 7; Cox A D Lobbenberg, 8. 3
1988	W	H M Pelham, 13. 7½; P Gleeson, 15. 1; R A Hull, 14. 7½; C G Penny, 15. 13½; T A D Cadoux-Hudson, 14. 6; G B Stewart, 16. 4; J W C Searle, 13. 13; M Gaffney, 14. 13; Cox A D Lobbenberg, 8. 5
1989	W	G B Blanchard, 13. 8; P Gleeson, 15. 0; G G C Cheveley, 13. 3; C A Maclennan, 13. 7; T Dillon, 14. 12; M Gaffney, 14. 9; J W C Searle, 13. 8; R J Thorp, 13. 2; Cox A R M Norrish, 7. 13
1990	W	M Gaffney J J Heathcote R A Hull D G Miller R J Obholzer M C Pinsent J W C Searle T G Slocock M W Watts
1991	W	P A J Bridge N Chugani H P M Hume C A Maclennan R W Martin J G Michels R J Obholzer M C Pinsent R C Young
1992	W	K K Poole, 13. 4; J G Michels, 13. 2½; B Mavra, 14. 8; H P M Hume, 13. 2½; P A J Bridge, 13. 13½; C A Maclennan, 14. 6½; S G Davy, 12. 6; I W Gardiner, 13. 1; Cox E H Chick, 7. 11½
1993		K K Poole, 12. 13½; J G Michels, 12. 8½; B Mavra, 14. 1½; R H Manners, 14. 13; B D Robertson, 14. 12; M C Pinsent, 15. 2½; P A A Schuller, 13. 8; I W Gardiner, 12. 12½; Cox S L Benham, 7. 7
1994		H J MacMillan, 14. 5½; C N Mahne, 14. 10½; J G Michels, 13. 4½; A S Gordon-Brown, 14. 12½; D R H Clegg, 13. 12; S Lorgen, 16. 1; S Lorgen, 15. 8½; K K Poole, 13. 2½; Cox H E Chick, 7. 10
1995		J R W Kawaja 13 9½; G A Rosengren 14 3; B Mavra 14 13; L S T Reed 15 5; J B McLanahan 14 1½; H S Corroon 14 2; D R H Clegg 14 6; J I Thronsden 14 0½; Cox A C Chapman
1996		E J Bellamy 13 7; D R H Clegg 13 12; J F Hammond 13 10; D R West 13 5; B Mann 14 10; J W Howick 13 8; P A Berger 14 8; A R A Frost 14 0; Cox T B Kristol
1997		N J Robinson 13 10; C P A Humphreys 13 0; J B Roycroft 14 0; A J R Lindsay 14 2; R Blanda 15 9; L Grubor 15 10; J Irving 13 12; T J C Foster 14 3; P A Greeney, 8 7
1998		C P A Humphreys 12 11; J B Roycroft 13 6½; J Hecht 14 11; H K Nilsson 14 1; E R Coode 14 6½; A J R Lindsay 14 7½; P A Berger 14 5r½; N J Robinson 13 7; Cox P A Greaney
1999		C P A Humphreys 13 1; L H K Nilsson 14 1; D R Snow 15 9; T H Ayer 15 9; M M Crotty 14 12; M A L Crooks 14 1; A J R Lindsay 14 3; C R D Von Ettinghausen 15 2; Cox N J O'Donnell

== 2000–2019 ==
2000–2019
Year		Crew
2000	W	A Dunn, 14. 3; N Robinson, 14. 5; B J Burch, 14. 12; M J Smith, 12. 13; D R Snow 15. 13; T Ayer, 15. 9; E B Lilledahl, 14. 9; A Reid, 14. 3; Cox K McLaren, 7
2001		R E G Bourne-Taylor, 12. 10; M F Bonham, 14. 5; E B Lilledahl, 15. 3½; I R W Weighell, 15. 3½; D R Snow, 15. 11½; B J Burch, 15. 0; B T Palm, 14. 9; M J Smith, 12. 1; Cox J C Moncrieff, 7. 1
2002	W	A G G Dunn, 12. 10; B G Dixon, 14. 3; A G Eggenkamp, 14. 7; D B Perkins, 15. 3; L W McGee, 15. 3; B J Burch, 15. 0; R E G Bourne-Taylor, 13. 11; M J Smith, 12. 1; Cox P E P Hackworth, 8. 1
2003	W	J Adams, 13. 2; B G Dixon, 13. 10; S McLennan; S Frandsen, 12. 12; R E G Bourne-Taylor, 13. 1; D Livingston, 14. 1½; H Morris, 13. 0; M J Smith, 12. 8½; Cox A Nethercott 8. 10
2004		C Kennelly, 13. 7¼; B G Dixon, 14. 2; A Stubbs, 14. 12; J Scrogin, 15. 1; P Reed, 15. 7½; D Livingston, 14. 6; H Morris, 13. ½; C Smith, 13. 4; A Nethercott, 8. 9
2005	W	R E G Bourne-Taylor, 14. 1½; B Wiliams, 15. 6; P Reed, 15. 7½; J von Maltzahn, 15. 4½, C Liwski, 15. 10½; M Blomquist, 15. 2; J Flickinger, 16. 8; A Triggs Hodge, 16. 0; Cox A Nethercott, 8. 7½
2006	W	R Esjmond-Frey, 14. 5; C Smith, 12. 13; T Parker, 14. 5; P Daniels, 14. 8; J Schroeder, 15. 11; B Williams, 14. 8; J Wetzel, 15. 7; B Ripoll, 13. 9; Cox S Pearce, 8. 7
2007		R Esjmond-Frey, 14. 6; A Kosmicki, 15. 2; M Plotkowiak, 14. 13; M Fleming, 15. 3; A Wright, 14. 1; W Buckland, 15. 11; T Kooyker, 13. 9; A Kusurin, 15. 0; Cox N Brodie, 8. 9
2008	W	J Herzog; T Medaris; B Smith; Aa Marcovy; M Wherley; O Moore; C Cole; W England; Cox N Brodie
2009	W	M Plotkowiak; C Smith; A Hearne; B Harrison; S Hamburger; T Solesbury; G Bridgewater; A Kušurin; Cox C Groshong
2010		B S Myers; M P Walsh; T Winklevoss; C Winklevoss; S H Hamburger; M G Evans; S A Gawlik; C D Burkitt; Cox A M Barhamand
2011	W	M C Hafner, 12. 9; B S Myers, 15. 6; A N R Dent, 14. 2; B F D Ellison, 14. 10; K A Z Hudspith, 14. 8; C M Louloudis, 14. 9½; G A Whittaker, 13. 10; S M Hislop, 14. 8; Cox S A Winter-Levy, 8. 8
2012		A Woods; W Zeng; K Baum; A Davidson; K A Z Hudspith; H Wienhausen; D Harvey; R Haen; Cox Z de Toledo
2013	W	P J Close, 14. 2; G W Macleod, 13. 10; A Davidson, 15. 2; S O'Connor, 14; P M Bennett, 15.11; K A Z Hudspith, 14. 8; C M Louloudis 14. 11; M Howard, 17. 3; Cox O A Zorrilla, 8. 4
2014	W	S Uru; T Watson; K Hudspith; T Swartz; M Howard; M di Santo; S O'Connor; C M Louloudis; Cox L Harvey
2015	W	W Geffen, 12. 13; J O'Connor, 13. 1; H Goodier, 13. 12; T Swartz, 12. 1; J Cook, 13. 2; M di Santo, 14. 4; S O'Connor, 13. 13; C M Louloudis, 14. 7; Cox W Hakim
2016		G McKirdy, 12. 1; J White, 13. 10; M Gerlak, 13. 7; J Bugajski, 15. 2; L Carrington, 13. 10; J Tveit, 12. 13; J Cook, 13. 5; N Hazell, 14. 13; Cox S Collier 8. 12
2017	W	W. Warr, 14. 9; M. O'Leary, 11. 8; O. Cook, 14. 4; J. Bugajski, 15. 6; O. Siegelaar, 15. 9; M. di Santo, 14. 1; J. Cook, 13. 2; V. Ragoussis, 13. 6; Cox S. Collier 9. 4
2018		C. Mertens, 11. 6; V. Ragoussis, 13. 9; W. Cahill, 13. 3; A. Weiss, 14. 4; W. Geffen, 13. 7; B. Aldous, 15. 1; I. Mandale, 11. 8; F. Drinkall, 13. 2; Cox Z. T-Johnson 8. 6
2019		C Pearson, 13. 3; B Landis, 13. 6; A Harzheim, 14. 0; P Sullivan, 14. 3; T Schröder, 15. 6; F Drinkall, 13. 3; C Buchanan; A Wambersie, 14. 1; Cox T de Mendonca

== 2020–present ==
2020 onwards
Year		Crew
2020	‡	A Harzheim; H Frigaard; C Buchanan; A Wambersie; T Schröder; J-P Dufour; C Jopling; F Drinkall; O Perry+
2021		J Forward; A Bebb; M Barakso; F Drinkall; T Schröder; J-P Dufour; J Bowesman-Jones; A Wambersie; J Oberst+
2022	W	L Corrigan; D Ambler; B Delarze; J Robertson; R Roosli; C Elwes; A Groom; T Schröder; J Tottem+
2023		J Forward, A Bebb, F Orpin, T Sharrock, J Doran, J-P Dufour, T von Mueller, F Drinkall, A O'Hanlon+
2024		J Bennema; H Glenister; S Stacey; J Doran; E Kun; F Roper; L Jenkins; E Kemp; W Denegri+
2025		T Sharrock; W O'Connell; F Rawlinson; J Doran; T von Mueller; T Mackintosh; N Rusher; N Kohl; T Bernard+

== Key ==
- DH = Dead heat
- W = Won
- + = Coxswain
- ‡ Cancelled due to the COVID-19 pandemic after the crews were announced.

== See also ==
- List of Cambridge University Boat Race crews
- List of Oxford University Isis crews
