= The Boat Race 1928 =

80th Boat Race
- Date: 28 March 1928
- Winner: Cambridge
- Margin of victory: 10 lengths
- Winning time: 20 minutes 25 seconds
- Overall record (Cambridge–Oxford): 39–40
- Umpire: Charles Burnell (Oxford)

The 80th Boat Race took place on 28 March 1928. Held annually, the Boat Race is a side-by-side rowing race between crews from the Universities of Oxford and Cambridge along the River Thames. In a race umpired by former Oxford rower Charles Burnell, Cambridge won by ten lengths, the largest margin of victory since 1900, in a time of 20 minutes 25 seconds. The victory took the overall record to 40–39 in Oxford's favour.

== Background ==
William Dudley Ward coached the Light Blues for the 1928 Boat Race.

The Boat Race is a side-by-side rowing competition between the University of Oxford (sometimes referred to as the "Dark Blues") and the University of Cambridge (sometimes referred to as the "Light Blues"). The race was first held in 1829, and since 1845 has taken place on the 4.2-mile (6.8 km) Championship Course on the River Thames in southwest London. The rivalry is a major point of honour between the two universities; it is followed throughout the United Kingdom and, as of 2014, broadcast worldwide. Cambridge went into the race as reigning champions, having won the 1927 race by three lengths, with Oxford leading overall with 40 victories to Cambridge's 38 (excluding the "dead heat" of 1877).

Oxford were coached by H. R. Baker (who rowed for the Dark Blues in the 1908 and 1909 races), A. E. Kitchin (who also rowed in 1908), P. C. Mallam (a Dark Blue from 1921 to 1924 inclusive), C. M. Pitman (who rowed four times between 1892 and 1895) and J. D. W. Thomson (who was a three-time Blue between 1925 and 1927). Cambridge's coaches were William Dudley Ward (who had rowed in 1897, 1899 and 1900 races), Francis Escombe, P. H. Thomas (a four-time Blue between 1902 and 1905) and David Alexander Wauchope (who had rowed in the 1895 race). For the second year the umpire was Charles Burnell who had rowed for Oxford in the 1895, 1896, 1897 and 1898 races. Charles Kent, who rowed for Oxford in the 1891 race, was the finishing judge for the first time.

== Crews ==
The Oxford crew weighed an average of 12 st 9.625 lb (80.4 kg), 0.625 pounds (0.3 kg) per rower more than their opponents. Cambridge's crew contained three participants with Boat Race experience: R. Beesly, J. C. Holcroft and stroke T. E. Letchworth. Oxford saw four participants return, including number two T. W. Shaw and cox J. H. Croft, both of whom were making their third consecutive appearance in the event. One participant was registered as non-British: Oxford's number four H. C. Morphett was from Australia.

According to author and former Oxford rower George Drinkwater, the Cambridge crew were "really good" with the trial eights being "much above the average". After relocating to Ely in the build-up to the race, Cambridge's crew was reorganised and improved, before final modifications were made at Putney. Drinkwater stated "it was obvious that they were going to be a fast crew". Conversely, Oxford suffered from "a dearth of experienced material" who "never developed and were quite incapable of rowing a racing stroke".

Seat	Oxford			Cambridge		
Seat	Name	College	Weight	Name	College	Weight
Bow	M. C. Graham	Magdalen	11 st 4 lb	R. G. Michell	Gonville and Caius	11 st 4 lb
2	T. W. Shaw (P)	Christ Church	11 st 13 lb	N. M. Aldous	Selwyn	11 st 13 lb
3	N. E. Whiting	Worcester	11 st 11 lb	M. H. Warriner	1st Trinity	13 st 0 lb
4	H. C. Morphett	Brasenose	12 st 3 lb	R. Beesly	1st Trinity	13 st 4 lb
5	G. M. Brander	Exeter	13 st 9 lb	J. C. Holcroft (P)	Pembroke	12 st 13 lb
6	G. E. Godber	New College	12 st 12 lb	J. B. Collins	3rd Trinity	14 st 3 lb
7	P. W. Murray-Threipland	Christ Church	12 st 12 lb	R. A. Symonds	Lady Margaret Boat Club	11 st 12 lb
Stroke	W. S. Llewellyn	Balliol	12 st 3 lb	T. E. Letchworth	Pembroke	12 st 9 lb
Cox	Sir J. H. Croft	Brasenose	9 st 4 lb	A. L. Sulley	Selwyn	8 st 6 lb
Source: (P) – boat club president

== Race ==
The Championship Course along which the Boat Race is contested

Oxford won the toss and elected to start from the Middlesex station, handing the Surrey side of the river to Cambridge. Burnell started the race at 9:45 a.m. in reasonable conditions but on a poor tide. Cambridge took the lead from the start and were half a length ahead by the time they passed the boathouses (400 yards (370 m) along the course). Dropping the stroke rate to 29 strokes per minute, the Light Blues held off the faster rating Oxford to the Mile Post. Here Cambridge pushed away quickly and, according to Drinkwater, "long before Hammersmith the race had become a procession", so much so that the Light Blues reduced their efforts to a paddle.

Cambridge won by ten lengths in a time of 20 minutes 25 seconds, the slowest winning time since the 1925 race. It was their fifth consecutive victory and their ninth win in ten races and took the overall record to 40–39 in Oxford's favour. It was the largest winning margin where both boats completed the course since the 1900 race.
