= The Boat Race 1905 =

62nd Boat Race
- Date: 1 April 1905
- Winner: Oxford
- Margin of victory: 3 lengths
- Winning time: 20 minutes 35 seconds
- Overall record (Cambridge–Oxford): 27–34
- Umpire: Frederick I. Pitman (Cambridge)

The 62nd Boat Race took place on 1 April 1905. Held annually, the Boat Race is a side-by-side rowing race between crews from the Universities of Oxford and Cambridge along the River Thames. Cambridge went into the race as reigning champions, having won the previous year's race. In this year's race, umpired by former rower Frederick I. Pitman, Oxford won by three lengths in a time of 20 minutes 35 seconds. The victory took the overall record to 34–27 in their favour.

== Background ==
The Boat Race is a side-by-side rowing competition between the University of Oxford (sometimes referred to as the "Dark Blues") and the University of Cambridge (sometimes referred to as the "Light Blues"). The race was first held in 1829, and since 1845 has taken place on the 4.2-mile (6.8 km) Championship Course on the River Thames in southwest London. The rivalry is a major point of honour between the two universities; it is followed throughout the United Kingdom and, as of 2015, broadcast worldwide. Cambridge went into the race as reigning champions, having won the 1904 race by 4 1/2 lengths, while Oxford led overall with 33 victories to Cambridge's 27 (excluding the "dead heat" of 1877).

Cambridge were coached by John Edwards-Moss who had rowed in the 1902 and 1903 races, Francis Escombe and David Alexander Wauchope (who had rowed in the 1895 race). Oxford's coaches were William Fletcher, who rowed for them in the 1890, 1891, 1892 and 1893 races and C. K. Philips who had represented the Dark Blues four times between 1895 and 1898. The umpire for the third year was old Etonian and former Cambridge rower Frederick I. Pitman who rowed in the 1884, 1885 and 1886 races.

== Crews ==
The Cambridge crew weighed an average of 12 st 0 lb (76.0 kg), 1.375 pounds (0.6 kg) per rower more than their opponents. Oxford's crew contained five rowers with Boat Race experience, including A. K. Graham who was rowing in his third consecutive race. Cambridge saw four rowers return to their crew, including P. H. Thomas who was making his fourth appearance in the event. All of the participants in the race were registered as British.

According to former Oxford rower and author George Drinkwater, the Dark Blues, while they "had no great difficulties in training ... never got really together or attained any great place". Conversely, the Cambridge crew "suffered many misfortunes." Old Etonian W. P. Wormald was forbidden from joining the crew by doctors, his replacement Stanley Bruce had to stand down soon after the Light Blues arrived at Putney, and he was replaced by novice P. H. Thomas who was unfit having recently returned from Africa.

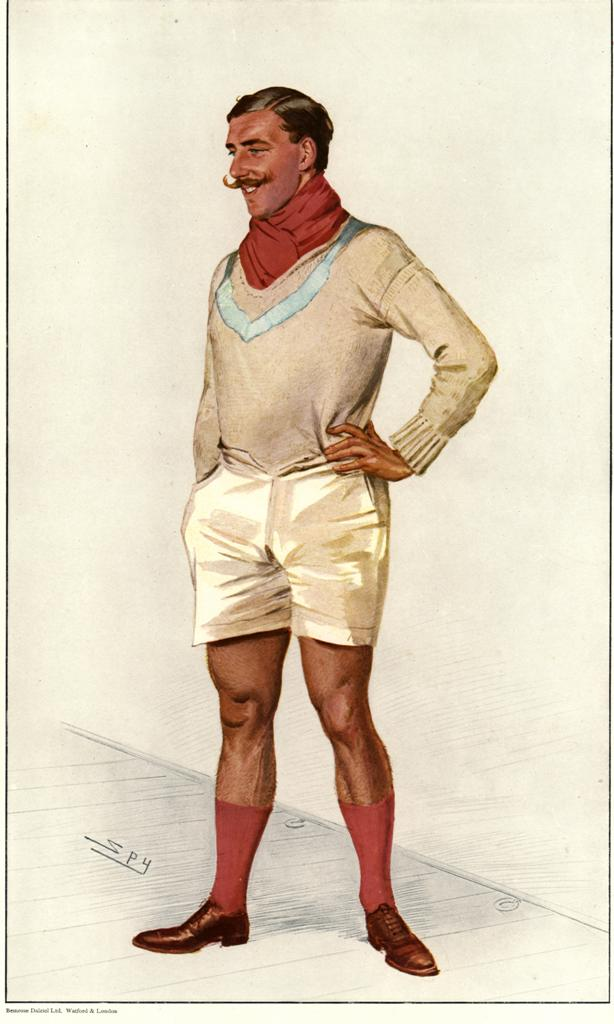
Banner Johnstone rowed at number three for Cambridge.

Seat	Oxford			Cambridge		
Seat	Name	College	Weight	Name	College	Weight
Bow	R. W. Somers-Smith	Merton	10 st 9 lb	H. Sanger (P)	Lady Margaret Boat Club	10 st 9 lb
2	H. M. Farrer	Balliol	11 st 5 lb	W. B. Savory	1st Trinity	12 st 9 lb
3	A. J. S. H. Hales	Corpus Christi	12 st 0 lb	B. C. Johnstone	3rd Trinity	12 st 4 lb
4	A. R. Balfour	University	12 st 0 lb	P. H. Thomas	3rd Trinity	12 st 4.5 lb
5	L. E. Jones	Balliol	13 st 9.5 lb	E. P. W. Wedd	Gonville and Caius	13 st 1 lb
6	E. P. Evans	University	13 st 2.5 lb	B. R. Winthrop-Smith	3rd Trinity	12 st 7 lb
7	A. K. Graham (P)	Balliol	13 st 3.5 lb	R. V. Powell	3rd Trinity	12 st 3 lb
Stroke	H. C. Bucknall	Merton	11 st 1.5 lb	C. H. S. Taylor	Gonville and Caius	10 st 4 lb
Cox	L. P. Stedall	Merton	8 st 0 lb	R. Allcard	3rd Trinity	8 st 6 lb
Source: (P) – boat club president

== Race ==
The Championship Course along which the Boat Race is contested

Cambridge won the toss and elected to start from the Middlesex station, handing the Surrey side of the river to Oxford. The race started at 11:30 a.m. under the command of umpire Pitman, and the Dark Blues took the lead. According to Drinkwater, they "had the race well in hand at the Mile" and "won as they liked it." Oxford won by three lengths in a time of 20 minutes 35 seconds. It was their first victory in four years and the narrowest winning margin since the 1901 race.
