= The Boat Race 1902 =

59th Boat Race
- Date: 22 March 1902
- Winner: Cambridge
- Margin of victory: 5 lengths
- Winning time: 19 minutes 9 seconds
- Overall record (Cambridge–Oxford): 25–33
- Umpire: Frank Willan (Oxford)

The 59th Boat Race took place on 22 March 1902. Held annually, the Boat Race is a side-by-side rowing race between crews from the Universities of Oxford and Cambridge along the River Thames. Although Oxford used swivel rowlocks for the first time in the history of the race, Cambridge won by five lengths in a time of 19 minutes 9 seconds. The victory took the overall record to 33–25 in Oxford's favour.

== Background ==
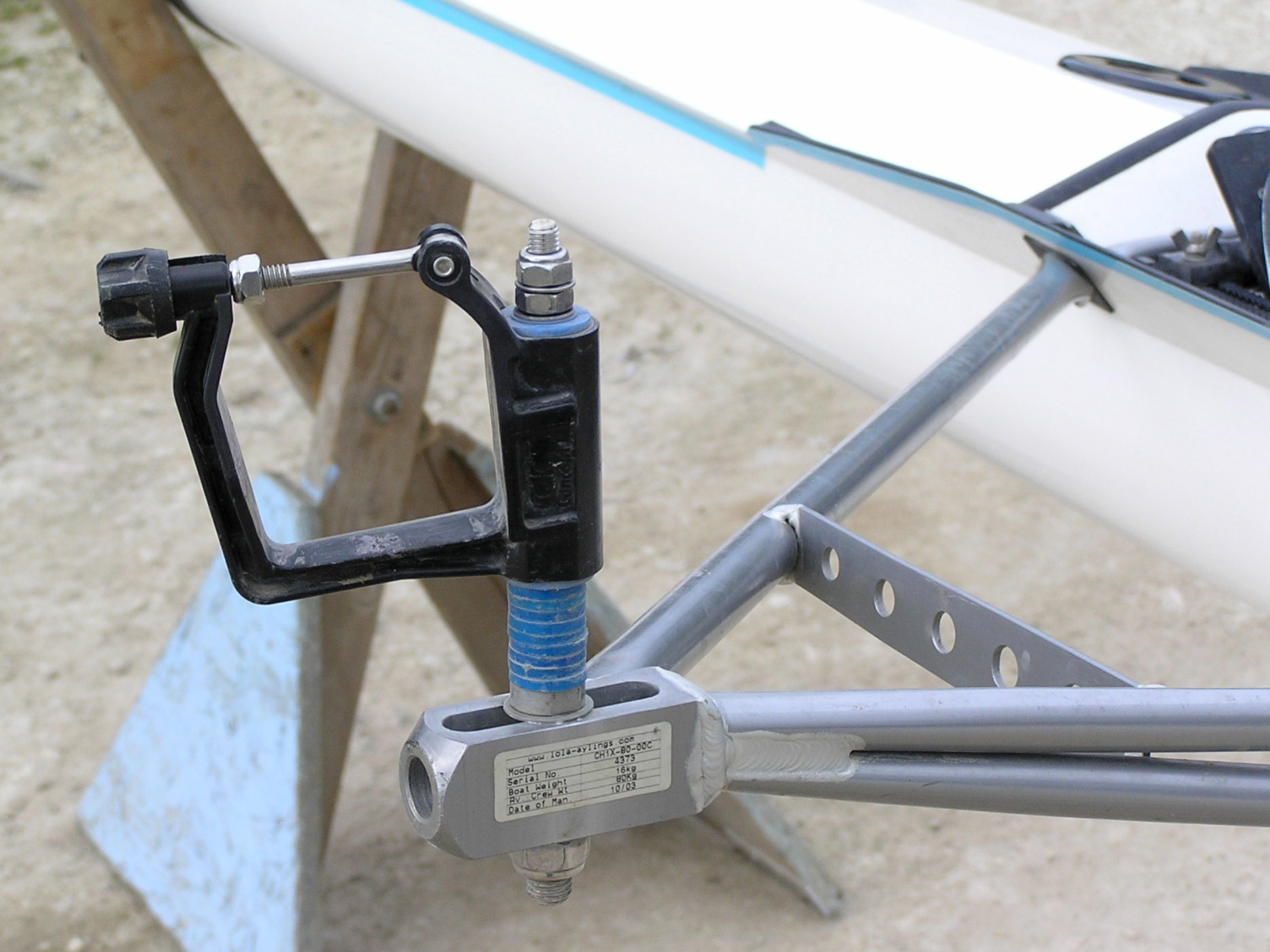
A modern swivel rowlock. Oxford were the first crew to use the recently patented technology in the Boat Race in 1902.

The Boat Race is a side-by-side rowing competition between the University of Oxford (sometimes referred to as the "Dark Blues") and the University of Cambridge (sometimes referred to as the "Light Blues"). The race was first held in 1829, and since 1845 has taken place on the 4.2-mile (6.8 km) Championship Course on the River Thames in southwest London. The rivalry is a major point of honour between the two universities and followed throughout the United Kingdom and worldwide. Oxford went into the race as reigning champions, having won the 1901 race by two-fifths of a length, and led overall with 33 victories to Cambridge's 24 (excluding the "dead heat" of 1877).

Oxford's coaches were G. C. Bourne who had rowed for Oxford in the 1882 and 1883 races, William Fletcher, who rowed for Oxford in the 1890, 1891, 1892 and 1893 races and Harcourt Gilbey Gold (Dark Blue president for the 1900 race and four-time Blue). Cambridge were coached by John Ernest Payne (two-time Blue in 1899 and 1900). The umpire for the race for the thirteenth year in a row was Frank Willan who won the event four consecutive times, rowing for Oxford in the 1866, 1867, 1868 and 1869 races. It was his last time in charge of the race as he would be replaced by Frederick I. Pitman the following year.

With a hard frost impeding Cambridge's practice in Ely, the crew relocated, at the invitation of Sir John Edwards-Moss, to Henley-on-Thames where parts of the river were clear of ice. Oxford disregarded Felix Warre's latest boat in favour of the previous year's vessel, however with the inclusion of the recently patented "swivel rowlock". According to Oxford rower and author George Drinkwater (who rowed at bow for the Dark Blues in this race), the rowlocks "were not altogether a success" and stated that while Cambridge could "row a faster stroke", the Dark Blues "were very ponderous".

== Crews ==
The Oxford crew weighed an average of 12 st 6.5 lb (79.0 kg), 4.5 pounds (2.04 kg) per rower more than their opponents. The Cambridge crew contained four rowers with Boat Race experience, including Wilfrid Hubert Chapman who had last rowed in the 1899 race. Seven of the nine members of the Cambridge crew matriculated at Trinity College. Oxford saw five former Blues return, including cox Gilchrist Maclagan who was steering in his fourth consecutive race. The Dark Blues also featured a pair of brothers, John George and Devereux Milburn, who were also the race's only non-British participants, hailing from the United States having attended The Hill School in Pennsylvania before studying at Harvard University.

Seat	Oxford			Cambridge		
Seat	Name	College	Weight	Name	College	Weight
Bow	G. C. Drinkwater	Wadham	11 st 7 lb	W. H. Chapman	3rd Trinity	11 st 2 lb
2	D. Milburn	Lincoln	12 st 4.5 lb	T. Drysdale	Jesus	12 st 2 lb
3	J. Younger	New College	12 st 12.5 lb	P. H. Thomas	3rd Trinity	12 st 5 lb
4	H. J. Hale (P)	Balliol	13 st 1 lb	C. W. H. Taylor (P)	3rd Trinity	12 st 8 lb
5	J. G. Milburn	Lincoln	13 st 3.5 lb	F. J. Escombe	Trinity Hall	12 st 8 lb
6	A. de L. Long	New College	13 st 0.25 lb	H. B. Grylls	1st Trinity	12 st 10 lb
7	H. W. Adams	University	12 st 1.5 lb	J. Edwards-Moss	3rd Trinity	12 st 4 lb
Stroke	F. O. J. Huntley	University	11 st 7.5 lb	R. H. Nelson	3rd Trinity	11 st 5 lb
Cox	G. S. Maclagan	Magdalen	8 st 5 lb	C. H. S. Wasbrough	Trinity Hall	8 st 1 lb
Source: (P) – boat club president

== Race ==
The Championship Course along which the Boat Race is contested

Cambridge won the toss and elected to start from the Surrey station, handing the Middlesex side of the river to Oxford. At the time of the race it was raining; umpire Willan started proceedings at 12:45 p.m. and Cambridge led from the first stroke. Within two minutes they were clear of Oxford, and, out-rating them marginally for the duration of the race, they pulled away with every stroke. Cambridge passed the finishing post with a five-length lead, in a time of 19 minutes 9 seconds. It was the Light Blues third win in four years and the victory took the overall record in the event to 33–25 in Oxford's favour.
