= The Boat Race 1908 =

65th Boat Race
- Date: 4 April 1908
- Winner: Cambridge
- Margin of victory: 2 1/2 lengths
- Winning time: 19 minutes 20 seconds
- Overall record (Cambridge–Oxford): 30–34
- Umpire: Frederick I. Pitman (Cambridge)

The 65th Boat Race took place on 4 April 1908. Held annually, the Boat Race is a side-by-side rowing race between crews from the Universities of Oxford and Cambridge along the River Thames. Cambridge were reigning champions, having won the previous year's race. In a race umpired by Frederick I. Pitman, Cambridge won by 2 1/2 lengths in a time of 19 minutes 20 seconds. It was their third consecutive victory and their sixth win in seven races, taking the overall record in the event to 34–30 in Oxford's favour.

== Background ==
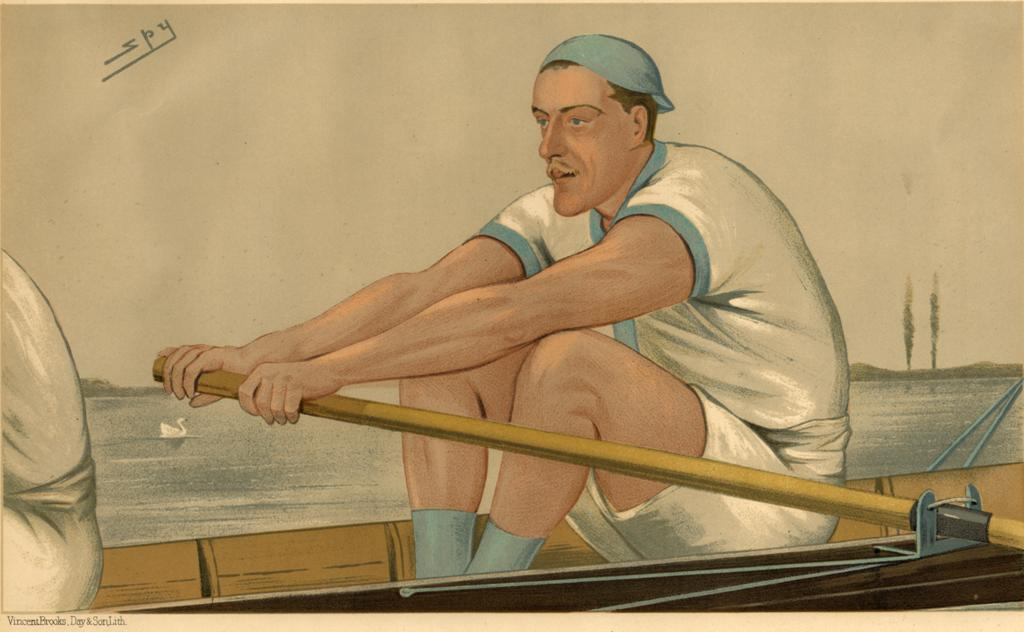
Former Cambridge University Boat Club rower Stanley Muttlebury coached the Light Blues.

The Boat Race is a side-by-side rowing competition between the University of Oxford (sometimes referred to as the "Dark Blues") and the University of Cambridge (sometimes referred to as the "Light Blues"). The race was first held in 1829, and since 1845 has taken place on the 4.2-mile (6.8 km) Championship Course on the River Thames in southwest London. The rivalry is a major point of honour between the two universities; it is followed throughout the United Kingdom and, as of 2015, broadcast worldwide. Cambridge went into the race as reigning champions, having won the 1907 race by 4 1/2 lengths, while Oxford led overall with 34 victories to Cambridge's 29 (excluding the "dead heat" of 1877).

Cambridge's coaches were L. H. K. Bushe-Fox, Francis Escombe (for the fifth consecutive year), Stanley Muttlebury, five-time Blue between 1886 and 1890, and David Alexander Wauchope (who had rowed in the 1895 race). Oxford were coached by Harcourt Gilbey Gold (Dark Blue president for the 1900 race and four-time Blue) and R. P. P. Rowe, who had rowed four times between 1889 and 1892. For the fifth year the umpire was old Etonian Frederick I. Pitman who rowed for Cambridge in the 1884, 1885 and 1886 races.

== Crews ==
The Cambridge crew weighed an average of 12 st 3.25 lb (77.5 kg), 3.5 pounds (1.6 kg) per rower more than their opponents. Oxford's crew contained four members with previous Boat Race experience, including Alister Kirby and Albert Gladstone who were rowing in their third race. Six of the Dark Blue crew were educated at Eton College. Cambridge also saw four members return, with Douglas Stuart and Eric Powell making their third appearances in the event. Light Blue number two George Eric Fairbairn was following in his uncle's footsteps: Steve Fairbairn rowed for Cambridge four times in the 1880s. Oxford's number three, Australian Collier Cudmore, was the only non-British participant registered in the race.

Former Oxford rower and author George Drinkwater assessed the Cambridge crew as "better and stronger than in the previous year". Conversely, "misfortune dogged the [Oxford] crew": firstly their number five of 1907, James Angus Gillan was available but forbidden to row by his doctors. Influenza then swept through the crew, before Kirby was struck down by jaundice; despite not fully recovering, he took part in the race.

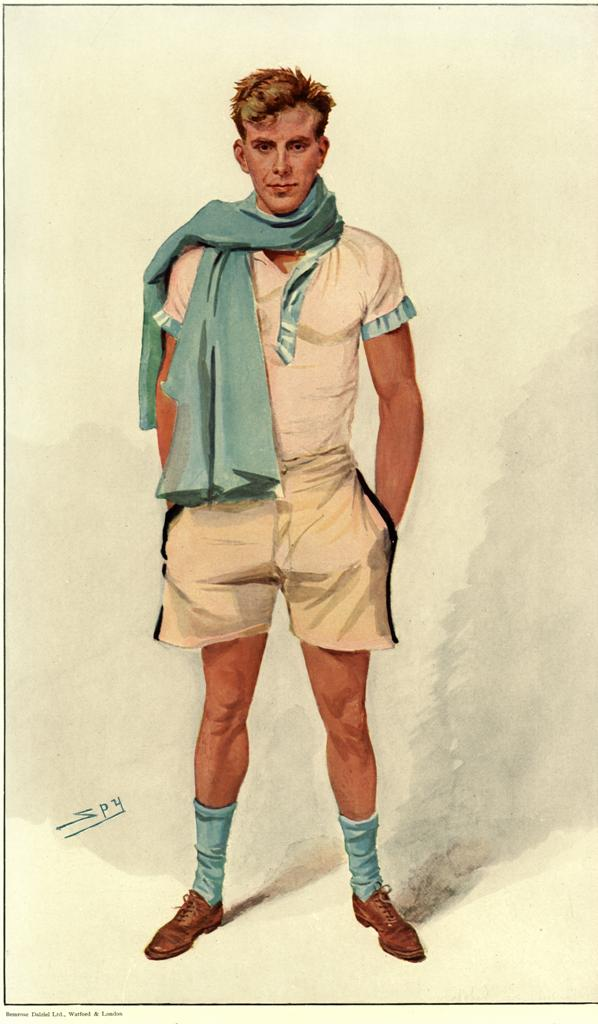
Douglas Stewart rowed at stroke for Cambridge.

Seat	Oxford			Cambridge		
Seat	Name	College	Weight	Name	College	Weight
Bow	Hon. R. P. Stanhope	Magdalen	9 st 10 lb	F. H. Jerwood	Jesus	11 st 10 lb
2	C. R. Cudmore	Magdalen	12 st 0 lb	G. E. Fairbairn	Jesus	11 st 13 lb
3	E. H. L. Southwell	Magdalen	12 st 3 lb	O. A. Carver	1st Trinity	12 st 10 lb
4	A. E. Kitchin	St John's	12 st 7 lb	H. E. Kitching	Trinity Hall	13 st 2 lb
5	A. G. Kirby (P)	Magdalen	13 st 7 lb	J. S. Burn	1st Trinity	12 st 10.5 lb
6	A. McCulloch	University	12 st 9.5 lb	E. G. Williams	3rd Trinity	13 st 0.5 lb
7	H. R. Barker	Christ Church	12 st 0.5 lb	E. W. Powell (P)	3rd Trinity	11 st 6 lb
Stroke	A. C. Gladstone	Christ Church	11 st 3.5 lb	D. C. R. Stuart	Trinity Hall	11 st 2 lb
Cox	A. W. F. Donkin	Magdalen	8 st 7 lb	R. F. R. P. Boyle	Trinity Hall	8 st 10 lb
Source: (P) – boat club president

== Race ==
The Championship Course along which the Boat Race is contested

Oxford won the toss and elected to start from the Surrey station, handing the Middlesex side of the river to Cambridge. In a strong head-wind, umpire Pitman started the race at 3:30 p.m. The Light Blues made the better start, and slightly out-rating Oxford, began to pull away. Rough water favoured Cambridge's style of rowing, and they were clear of Oxford by the time they passed the Mile Post. The crews passed Harrods Furniture Depository with the Light Blues two lengths ahead and although the Dark Blues spurted again and again, they failed to make any inroads in the Cambridge lead, who began to pull away once again after passing under Barnes Bridge. They passed the finishing post leading by two and a half lengths in a time of 19 minutes 20 seconds. It was Cambridge's third consecutive victory, and their sixth in seven years, and took the overall record to 34–30 in Oxford's favour. The winning time was the fastest since the 1902 race and it was the narrowest margin of victory since the 1901 race. Drinkwater described the race as "a much finer struggle than those of the two previous years".
