= The Boat Race 1898 =

55th Boat Race
- Date: 24 March 1898
- Winner: Oxford
- Margin of victory: "easily"
- Winning time: 22 minutes 15 seconds
- Overall record (Cambridge–Oxford): 22–32
- Umpire: Frank Willan (Oxford)

The 55th Boat Race took place on 24 March 1898. Held annually, the Boat Race is a side-by-side rowing race between crews from the Universities of Oxford and Cambridge along the River Thames. Oxford, the reigning champions and leading overall, went into the race with a marginally heavier crew than Cambridge. They won "easily" as Cambridge's boat became waterlogged in strong winds and inclement conditions. It was their ninth consecutive victory and took them to an overall lead of 32–22 in the event. The winning time of 22 minutes 15 seconds was the slowest since the 1878 race.

== Background ==
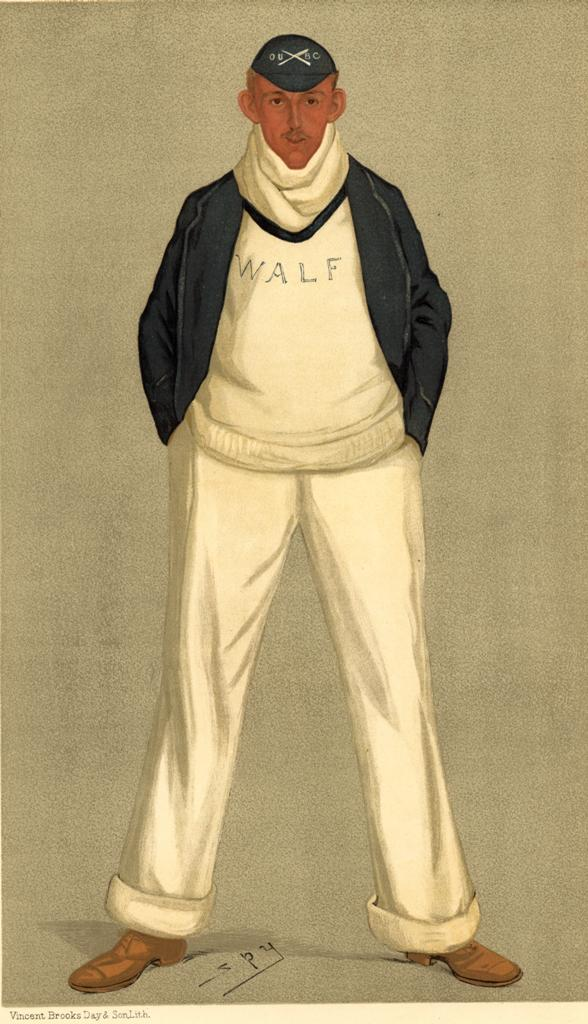
William Fletcher, former Oxford rower, coached Cambridge.

The Boat Race is a side-by-side rowing competition between the University of Oxford (sometimes referred to as the "Dark Blues") and the University of Cambridge (sometimes referred to as the "Light Blues"). The race was first held in 1829, and since 1845 has taken place on the 4.2-mile (6.8 km) Championship Course on the River Thames in southwest London. The rivalry is a major point of honour between the two universities; it is followed throughout the United Kingdom and as of 2014, broadcast worldwide. Oxford went into the race as reigning champions, having won the 1897 race by 2 1/2 lengths, with Cambridge leading overall with 31 victories to Cambridge's 22 (excluding the "dead heat" of 1877).

Oxford were coached by G. C. Bourne who had rowed for Oxford in the 1882 and 1883 races and Douglas McLean (an Oxford Blue five times between 1883 and 1887). Cambridge's president, William Dudley Ward, despite opposition, invited William Fletcher, Oxford Blue and former coach, to assist in teaching his crew the style required to challenge the Dark Blues. Several members of the Light Blue crew refused to row, and Dudley Ward himself was refused leave to row on grounds of sickness. According to George Drinkwater, former rower and author, "Fletcher turned out a crew well above the average of previous years." Conversely, Oxford "did not develop as it should have done" and was "by no means up to the average of those that went before it."

The umpire for the race for the tenth year in a row was Frank Willan who won the event four consecutive times, rowing for Oxford in the 1866, 1867, 1868 and 1869 races.

== Crews ==
The Oxford crew weighed an average of 12 st 7 lb (79.2 kg), 0.5 pounds (0.2 kg) per rower more than their opponents. Cambridge's crew contained two participants with Boat Race experience: Adam Searle Bell who was rowing in his fourth contest and cox Edward Caesar Hawkins steering in his second appearance. Claude Goldie, son of John rowed at number seven for the Light Blues. Oxford saw six members of the previous crew return, including Charles Burnell and R. Carr, both of whom were making their fourth consecutive appearance in the race. Eight of the nine crew Oxford crew had studied at Eton College. R. O. Pitman, rowing at bow for Oxford, was the third of his siblings to participate in the Boat Race, with his brothers Frederick I. Pitman rowing for Cambridge between 1884 and 1886 and C. M. Pitman who rowed for Oxford between 1892 and 1895.

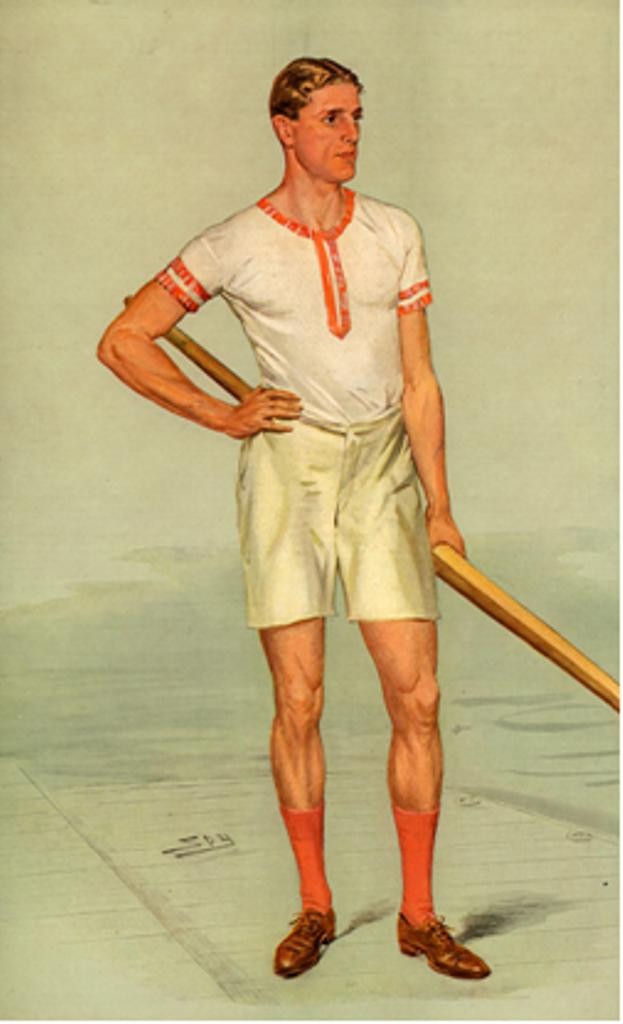
Raymond Etherington-Smith rowed at number six for Cambridge.

Seat	Oxford			Cambridge		
Seat	Name	College	Weight	Name	College	Weight
Bow	R. O. Pitman	New College	11 st 0 lb	W. B. Rennie	Emmanuel	11 st 7 lb
2	G. O. C. Edwards	New College	12 st 7.5 lb	J. F. Beale	1st Trinity	12 st 2.25 lb
3	C. K. Phillips (P)	New College	12 st 0.5 lb	H. G. Brown	1st Trinity	13 st 11.75 lb
4	F. W. Warre	Balliol	12 st 12 lb	S. V. Pearson	Emmanuel	12 st 9 lb
5	C. D. Burnell	Magdalen	14 st 0 lb	A. W. Swanston	Jesus	12 st 10 lb
6	R. Carr	Magdalen	13 st 1 lb	R. B. Etherington-Smith	1st Trinity	12 st 11.25 lb
7	A. T. Herbert	Balliol	12 st 10.5 lb	C. J. D. Goldie	3rd Trinity	12 st 0 lb
Stroke	H. G. Gold	Magdalen	11 st 10.5 lb	A. S. Bell	Trinity Hall	12 st 2.25 lb
Cox	H. R. K. Pechell	Brasenose	8 st 1 lb	E. C. Hawkins	Gonville and Caius	8 st 4 lb
Source: (P) – boat club president William Dudley Ward was Cambridge's non-rowing president.

== Race ==
The Championship Course along which the Boat Race is contested

According to author and former Oxford rower George Drinkwater, "there was a gale blowing ... which met a spring tide, so that the water was very rough from the start." Oxford, the slight pre-race favourites, won the toss and elected to start from the Middlesex station, handing the rougher Surrey side of the river to Cambridge. Willan started the race at 3:47 p.m. but within four strokes, the Cambridge boat was "half-full of water".

Oxford steered towards the shore for shelter, with Cambridge following, but they had taken on so much water that "only the bladders which had been placed under their seats kept them afloat". Although the Dark Blues had shipped a fair amount of water, they were able to continue, and with Cambridge waterlogged, the race was effectively ended as a contest. Oxford won "easily", to secure their ninth consecutive victory in the slowest winning time since the 1878 race.
