= The Boat Race 1927 =

79th Boat Race
- Date: 2 April 1927
- Winner: Cambridge
- Margin of victory: 3 lengths
- Winning time: 20 minutes 14 seconds
- Overall record (Cambridge–Oxford): 38–40
- Umpire: Charles Burnell (Oxford)

Other races
- Women's winner: Oxford

The 79th Boat Race took place on 2 April 1927. Held annually, the Boat Race is a side-by-side rowing race between crews from the Universities of Oxford and Cambridge along the River Thames. Oxford's crew was marginally heavier than their opponents, and saw five participants return with Boat Race experience, compared to Cambridge's four. Umpired for the first time by former Oxford rower Charles Burnell, Cambridge won by three lengths in a time of 20 minutes 14 seconds. It was the first race in the history of the event to be broadcast live on BBC Radio. The victory took the overall record in the event to 40–38 in Oxford's favour. The inaugural Women's Boat Race was contested this year, with Oxford securing the victory.

== Background ==
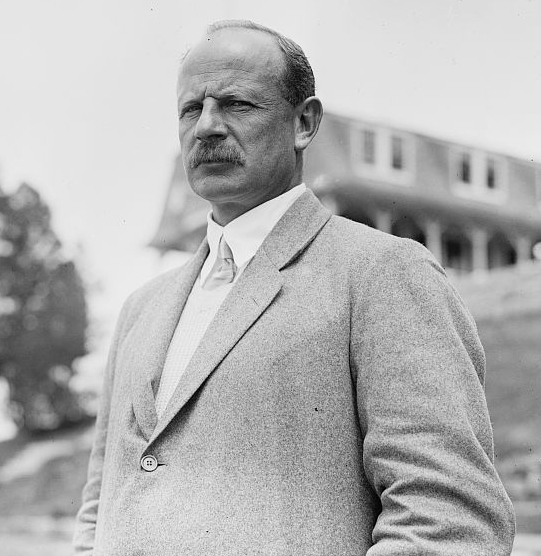
Guy Nickalls provided commentary from the umpire's launch for the first time in the event's history.

The Boat Race is a side-by-side rowing competition between the University of Oxford (sometimes referred to as the "Dark Blues") and the University of Cambridge (sometimes referred to as the "Light Blues"). The race was first held in 1829, and since 1845 has taken place on the 4.2-mile (6.8 km) Championship Course on the River Thames in southwest London. The rivalry is a major point of honour between the two universities; it is followed throughout the United Kingdom and, as of 2014, broadcast worldwide. Cambridge went into the race as reigning champions, having won the 1926 race by five lengths, with Oxford leading overall with 40 victories to Cambridge's 37 (excluding the "dead heat" of 1877). This year also saw the inaugural running of the Women's Boat Race, between female crews from the two universities.

Oxford were coached by H. R. Baker (who rowed for the Dark Blues in the 1908 and 1909 races), G. C. Bourne (who had rowed for the university in the 1882 and 1883 races), R. C. Bourne (who had rowed four times between 1909 and 1912) and P. C. Mallam (a Dark Blue from 1921 to 1924 inclusive). Cambridge were coached by William Dudley Ward (who had rowed in 1897, 1899 and 1900 races), Francis Escombe and David Alexander Wauchope (who had rowed in the 1895 race). For the first year the umpire was Charles Burnell, who had rowed for Oxford in the 1895, 1896, 1897 and 1898 races.

It was the first time that the progress of the race was broadcast on BBC Radio from the umpire's launch Magician. Poet J. C. Squire and Olympic gold medallist and former Oxford rower Guy Nickalls provided the commentary, with transmission equipment on the boat weighing in excess of 1,000 pounds (450 kg), and using a number of specially built reception points along the course. It was the second live outdoor commentary ever broadcast, the first being the Scotland versus England match of the 1927 Five Nations Championship.

== Crews ==
The Oxford crew weighed an average of 12 st 8.625 lb (79.9 kg), 2.25 pounds (1.0 kg) per rower more than their opponents. Cambridge's boat contained four participants with Boat Race experience, including cox J. A. Brown who was steering the Light Blues for the fourth consecutive year. Oxford saw five members of the previous year's crew return, including E. C. T. Edwards and James Douglas Wishart Thomson, both of whom were rowing for the third time in the event. Cambridge's Australian number six J. B. Bell and his opposite number, American Howard T. Kingsbury of Yale University, were the only non-British participants registered in the race.

According to author and former Oxford rower George Drinkwater, neither crew could "be classed in a very high standard", claiming Cambridge's selection was poor and Oxford's coaches indecisive. Ten days before the race, Oxford's W. S. Llewellyn was struck down by German measles and was replaced by A. M. Hankin who was placed at stroke.

Seat	Oxford			Cambridge		
Seat	Name	College	Weight	Name	College	Weight
Bow	N. E. Whiting	Worcester	11 st 9 lb	Hon. J. S. Maclay	1st Trinity	11 st 9 lb
2	P. Johnson	Magdalen	11 st 11 lb	T. E. Letchworth	Pembroke	12 st 7 lb
3	E. C. T. Edwards	Christ Church	12 st 10 lb	J. C. Holcroft	Pembroke	12 st 5 lb
4	J. D. W. Thomson (P)	University	13 st 6 lb	R. Beesly	1st Trinity	12 st 11.5 lb
5	W. Rathbone	Christ Church	13 st 13 lb	L. V. Bevan	Lady Margaret Boat Club	13 st 3.5 lb
6	H. T. Kingsbury	Queen's	14 st 2 lb	J. B. Bell	Jesus	13 st 3 lb
7	T. W. Shaw	Christ Church	12 st 7 lb	S. K. Tubbs (P)	Gonville and Caius	12 st 3 lb
Stroke	A. M. Hankin	Worcester	10 st 11 lb	R. J. Elles	Trinity Hall	11 st 9 lb
Cox	Sir J. H. Croft	Brasenose	8 st 12 lb	J. A. Brown	Gonville and Caius	8 st 10.5 lb
Source: (P) – boat club president

== Race ==
The Championship Course along which the Boat Race is contested

Oxford won the toss and elected to start from the Surrey station, handing the Middlesex side of the river to Cambridge. In a strong wind and "big spring tide", Burnell started the race at 1:30 p.m. After a level start, Oxford held a canvas-length lead by the time the crews passed Craven Steps, but the Light Blues levelled the race using the advantage of the bend in the river at Craven Cottage. The crews passed the Mile Post level whereupon Oxford retook the lead, slightly out-rating their opponents and passed below Hammersmith Bridge with a half-length advantage. Nearly clear by The Doves pub, the Dark Blues ran into strong wind and rough water and Cambridge started to reduce their lead.

A lead of one-third of a length at Chiswick Steps was soon overhauled by the Light Blues who were almost clear at Barnes Bridge. They rowed on to win "comfortably" by three lengths in a time of 20 minutes 14 seconds. It was Cambridge's fourth consecutive victory and their eighth win in nine races, and took the overall record in the event to 40–38 in Oxford's favour. Following the race, the tide was so high that spectators were forced to wade through water that was knee-deep.

Oxford won the inaugural women's race by 15 seconds despite not rowing together; the crews were not permitted to compete side-by-side, that style of competition being considered "unladylike".
