= Edmond Warre =

English rower and Head Master

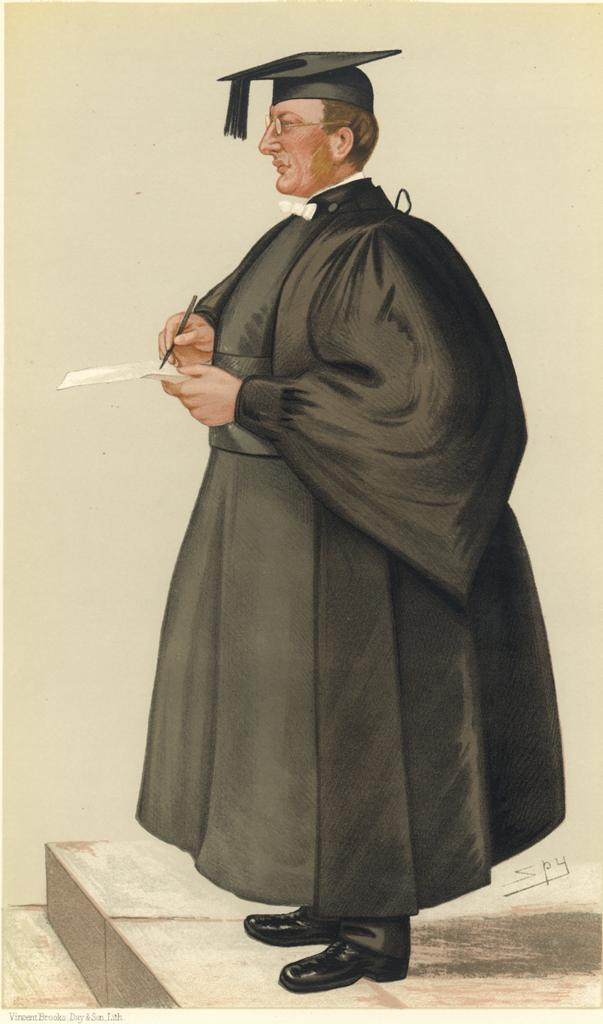
Edmond Warre "The Head" by Spy (Vanity Fair caricatures)

The Reverend Edmond Warre CB CVO (12 February 1837 – 22 January 1920) was an English rower and Head Master of Eton College from 1884 to 1905.

== Early life and education ==
Warre was born in London, the son of Henry Warre, of Bindon House, near Milverton, Somerset. He was educated at Eton, where he was an exact contemporary of Algernon Charles Swinburne, and then at Balliol College, Oxford, where he had a distinguished university career, taking a double first (1856 and 1859). He was an outstanding oarsman and at Eton he won the School Pulling for coxed pairs. At Oxford, he went Head of the River with Balliol in 1855 and 1859, won the University Sculls and Pairs in 1855–56 and the University Fours in 1856 and 1858, and was Oxford University Boat Club president in 1858. He rowed for Oxford in the tideway Boat Races of 1857 and 1858. He also won the Silver Goblets at Henley Royal Regatta in 1857 partnering Arthur Lonsdale. Warre and Lonsdale were runners up in 1858 but Warre won Silver Goblets again in 1859 partnering John Arkell. He also rowed at Henley in the Diamond Challenge Sculls, Ladies' Challenge Plate, and Grand Challenge Cup between 1855 and 1859.

== Career ==
In 1859, Warre was elected a Fellow of All Souls College, Oxford. In 1860 he returned to Eton as an assistant master, and in 1884 became Head Master, a position which he retained until 1905. He took much interest in sport at Eton, and the high standard of rowing which the Eton eights attained was due in a large measure to his coaching. His 45 years' connexion with Eton thoroughly identified him with its traditions and ideals, and, without being remarkable either as a scholar or as a teacher, he wielded a personal influence which has seldom been surpassed.

After a period of retirement, in 1909 he was appointed as Provost of Eton in succession to James John Hornby, but during the greater part of his provostship ill health prevented him from taking any very active part in the government of the school. He was an honorary chaplain to Queen Victoria (1885–1901), and later occupied the same office in the households of King Edward VII and King George V. He was appointed a member of the Royal Victorian Order in 1901, a Companion of the Order of the Bath in the 1905 Birthday Honours, and a Commander of the Royal Victorian Order in 1910.

In 1909, he edited Letters from the Peninsula, 1808–1812, his uncle Sir William Warre's account of the Peninsular War.

== Personal life and legacy ==
Warre married Florence Dora Malet (granddaughter of Sir Charles Malet, 1st Baronet) and died at Eton at the age of 82. His son Felix Warre also rowed in the University Boat Race and at Henley. Another son, Captain Edmond Lancelot Warre, described in contemporary reports as a ‘well-known architect', worked as the architect at Eton College from about 1911; he was also responsible for works to Wilton House.

Following his death, the historian C. R. L. Fletcher wrote a biography of Edmond Warre in 1922.

== See also ==
- List of Oxford University Boat Race crews

== Notes ==
Academic offices
Preceded by James John Hornby	Head Master of Eton College; 1884–1905	Succeeded by Edward Lyttelton
Preceded by James John Hornby	Provost of Eton; 1909–1918	Succeeded by M. R. James
