= Thomas Tait Pitman =

British Army officer (1868–1941)

Major-General Thomas Tait Pitman CB CMG JP
- Portrait by Walter Stoneman, 1919
- Born: 22 December 1868
- Died: 8 March 1941 (aged 72)
- Military career
- Allegiance: United Kingdom
- Branch: British Army
- Rank: Major-General
- Commands: 48th (South Midland) Division; 2nd Cavalry Division; 4th Cavalry Brigade; 11th Hussars
- Conflicts: Second Boer War; First World War
- Awards: Companion of the Order of the Bath; Companion of the Order of St Michael and St George; Mentioned in Despatches (6)

Major-General Thomas Tait Pitman, CB, CMG, JP (22 December 1868 – 8 March 1941) was a British cavalry officer, who was a general officer during the First World War.

== Personal life ==
Thomas Tait Pitman was born on 22 December 1868, the son of Frederick Pitman, Writer to the Signet, Edinburgh. He was one of eight brothers, including Frederick Islay Pitman and Charles Murray Pitman. In 1920 he married Violet Mary, only daughter of Sir Michael Lakin, 1st Baronet. He died on 8 March 1941.

== Military career ==
Pitman entered the British Army in 1889 and served with the 11th (Prince Albert's Own) Hussars for 26 years. He was commissioned a second lieutenant on 9 October 1889, was promoted to lieutenant on 6 April 1891, and to captain on 16 April 1895.

Seeing service in the North West Frontier campaign 1897–98, he then served in South Africa during the Second Boer War, where he was second-in-command of the 5th battalion of the Imperial Yeomanry. For his service he was mentioned in despatches (dated 1 June 1902, where he is commended for good service at Brakspruit on 11 April 1902).

After the end of the war in May 1902, he left Cape Town in the SS Plassy in August, returning to Southampton the following month. On his return he resigned from the Imperial Yeomanry and returned to his regiment.

On 29 September 1912 he was promoted to lieutenant colonel and became commanding officer (CO) of the 11th Hussars.

By the outbreak of the First World War almost two years later, Pitman took the 11th Hussars to the Western Front in August 1914. He was wounded at the Battle of Messines (1914). Later, after being promoted to the temporary rank of brigadier general in May 1915, he succeeded Cecil Bingham in command of the 4th Cavalry Brigade (1915–16) and the 2nd Cavalry Division (1918–19). He was promoted to substantive colonel in September 1916.

During the interwar period he was promoted to major general on 2 January 1923 and then became GOC 48th (South Midland) Division, a Territorial Army (TA) formation, in April 1926 before retiring from the army in April 1930.

Pitman was appointed a Companion of the Order of the Bath (CB) in 1915 and a Companion of the Order of St Michael and St George (CMG) in 1918 and was mentioned in dispatches six times. He was honorary colonel of the 11th Hussars from 17 February 1926 to 9 October 1939.

== Bibliography ==
- Becke, Archibald F. (1935). Order of Battle of Divisions Part 1–The Regular British Divisions. London: HMSO. OCLC 4405016.

Military offices
| Preceded by Sir Percy Radcliffe | GOC 48th (South Midland) Division; 1926–1930 | Succeeded by Ivo Vesey |
Honorary titles
| Preceded by Sir Arthur Lyttelton-Annesley | Colonel of the 11th Hussars; 1926–1939 | Succeeded by Sir Archibald Fraser Home |
