= William Augustine Ellison =

- Born: 1855
- Died: November 1, 1917 (aged 61–62); Eton, Berkshire, England
- Education: University College, Oxford
- Occupations: Physician; Surgeon; Apothecary; Rower
- Employer: British royal household
- Known for: Royal physician and competitive rowing

William Augustine Ellison (1855 – 1 November 1917) was an English rower and royal apothecary and surgeon.

Ellison was the son of James Ellison of Windsor. He was educated at Eton where he was a remarkable athlete, winning distinction as a footballer and gymnast and rowing twice in the Eton eight. He matriculated at University College, Oxford in 1874 where he was an active rower. He was thrice in the head of the river crew at Oxford and rowed in the Oxford crew in The Boat Race in 1878. Also in 1878, he won Silver Goblets at Henley Royal Regatta rowing for Oxford Etonian paired with Tom Edwards-Moss. In 1880 he rowed for Leander Club when he stroked the winning eight in the Grand Challenge Cup.

Ellison took the diploma of M.R.C.S. Eng. in 1882 and graduated M.B.Oxon. in 1884. He received his medical training at St George's Hospital and served as assistant medical registrar there. In 1888, he was appointed surgeon apothecary to Queen Victoria's household at Windsor Castle and became M.D. in 1895. During the 1890s he was acting resident, physician to Queen Victoria at Balmoral. He was reappointed as consulting physician to King Edward VII and later King George V. Ellison was also a member of the Eton College Medical Board, vice-president of the Medical Officers of Schools Association, and vice-president and member of council of the National League for Physical Education. He also commanded the first volunteer battalion of the Royal Berkshire Regiment for many years.

Ellison died at Eton at the age of 62.

== See also ==
- List of Oxford University Boat Race crews
