= List of Oxford University Isis crews =

This is a list of the Oxford University Isis crews who have competed in The Reserve Boat Race, which started in 1965.

Rowers are listed left to right in boat position from bow to stroke. The number following the rower indicates the rower's weight in stones and pounds.

== 2010 onwards ==
2010 onwards
Year	Wins	Crew
2010		W G Rueter, 14; M C Hafner, 11. 13½; A E L De Weck, 14. 9; D A W Bruce, 14; B E Grüter, 14. 6½; B J Le Feber, 13. 10; E P Newman, 13. 7½; A N R Dent, 13. 5½; Cox J Carlson, 8. 9
2011	W	D G Harvey, 12. 5½; M Pointing, 13. 3; A E L De Weck, 14. 9½; B E K Snodin, 13. 2½; A K Woods, 12. 8½; D A Whiffin, 14. 3½; G R Blessley, 13. 4; T S Watson, 11. 5; Cox Z M De Toledo, 7. 11¾
2012	W – Race Record	T Hilton, 11. 2; C W Fairweather, 14. 1; J J Bubb-Humfreys, 13. 10; B E K Snodin, 13. 3; J Dawson, 13. 12; G W Macleod, 13. 5; A J Webb, 15. 11; T S Watson, 11. 5; Cox K A Apfelbaum, 8. 7
2013	W	I Mandale, 11. 11; N Hazell, 14. 9; A K Woods, 12. 2; W Zeng, 13. 1; J Dawson, 14. 2; B French, 13. 2; J Stephenson, 12. 2; T S Watson, 11. 3; Cox L Harvey, 8. 6
2014	W	J Redos, 12. 13; A Bostrom, 13. 5; W Geffen, 12. 11; N Hazell, 14.11; J Fraser-Mackenzie, 13. 6; J Mountain 13. 8; I Mandale, 11. 4; C W Fairweather, 13. 8; Cox S Shawdon, 8. 5
2015	W	J Abdulla; C Thurston; M Gerlak; J Mountain; D Grant; J Bugajski; I Mandale; J Tveit; S Collier
2016	W	D Parr; R Stirling; W Geffen; C Thurston; J Dawson; B McSweeney; D Grant; T Commins; O Cleary
2017	W	J White; A Jacobson; W Cahill; A Harzheim; D Milovanovic; G Mckirdy; B Aldous; C Mertens; A Carbery
2018		J Olandi; A Wythe; C Wales; C Buchanan; N Elkington; B Bathurst; L Robinson; T Commins; A Carbery
2019		B Thomson; C Thurston; N Elkington; H Frigaard; J Bowesman-Jones; B Aldous; L Robinson; L von Malaise; D Brameier
2020	No Race	L von Malaise; D Holod; J White; N Elkington; A Bebb; C Pearson; J Bowesman-Jones; L Robinson; T de Mendonca
2021		C Rimmer; B Thomson; A Warley; N Elkington; H Pearson; A Teece; C Buchanan; L Robinson; O Perry
2022	W	P Denton; C Rimmer; J Forward; H Pearson; M Barakso; A Wambersie; T von Mueller; J Bowesman-Jones; L Corrigan
2023		C Andrews; A Wakefield; T Rigney; S Stacey; A Kenny; P Denton; H Amed; J Ole Ernst; L Corrigan
2024		H Rimmer; C Hull; A Underwood; F Orpin; J Hardin; T Sharrock; J Rosenfeld; G Reynolds; T Bernard
2025		F Crabtree; I Throsby; P Cicuta; Y Limmer; S Stacey; G Reynolds; L Robinson; T Rigney; T Slade
2026		W Randell; B Atkinson; K Roman; E Albers; H Lohan; C Dickinson; T Siri Heath; P Cicuta; J Ward

== See also ==
- List of Oxford University Boat Race crews
- List of Cambridge University Boat Race crews
