= John Arkell =

English clergyman and rower

John Arkell (1835–1923) was an English clergyman and a rower who won Silver Goblets at Henley Royal Regatta.

Arkell was born in Boddington, Gloucestershire and educated at Pembroke College, Oxford, where he was an oarsman. He rowed for Oxford in the Boat Race in 1857, 1858 and 1859. Oxford won in 1857 but lost in 1858. Arkell succeeded Edmond Warre as O.U.B.C. President, and implemented his idea of Trial Eights at Oxford in the autumn of 1858. Oxford won the 1859 Boat Race when Arkell was stroke.

In 1859, Arkell also partnered Warre to win Silver Goblets at Henley Royal Regatta beating A. A. Casamajor and James Paine in the final by four lengths.

Arkell took Holy Orders, and was at Manningtree, then Boxted, Essex and then Portishead, Somerset. He became rector of St Ebbe's Church, Oxford.

Arkell married Sarah Elizabeth Harwood at Marylebone in 1860 and they had 4 boys (Thomas, Charles, John and Henry) and 2 girls (Gertrude and Seringa).

Arkell died in Hungerford at the age of 87.

== See also ==
- List of Oxford University Boat Race crews
