= The Boat Race 1858 =

15th Boat Race
- Date: 27 March 1858
- Winner: Cambridge
- Margin of victory: 7 1/2 lengths
- Winning time: 21 minutes 23 seconds
- Overall record (Cambridge–Oxford): 9–6
- Umpire: Joseph William Chitty (Oxford)

The 15th Boat Race took place on the River Thames on 27 March 1858. Typically held annually, the event is a side-by-side rowing race between crews from the Universities of Oxford and Cambridge. The 1858 race, disrupted by poor rowing and a collision with a barge, was won by Cambridge, who defeated Oxford by 7 1/2 lengths in a time of 21 minutes 23 seconds.

== Background ==
The Boat Race is a side-by-side rowing competition between the University of Oxford (sometimes referred to as the "Dark Blues") and the University of Cambridge (sometimes referred to as the "Light Blues"). The race was first held in 1829, and since 1845 has taken place on the 4.2-mile (6.8 km) Championship Course on the River Thames in southwest London. Oxford went into this year's race as reigning champions, having defeated Cambridge by eleven lengths in the previous year's race. Cambridge however led overall with eight wins to Oxford's six.

Cambridge were coached for the fifth time by Thomas Selby Egan, (who had coxed the Light Blues in the 1836, 1839 and 1840 races), while Oxford's coach was Alfred Shadwell (cox for the Dark Blues in the 1842 race and coach for the fourth time). The race was umpired by Joseph William Chitty who had rowed for Oxford twice in 1849 (in the March and December races) and the 1852 race, while the starter was Edward Searle.

== Crews ==
The Oxford crew weighed an average of 11 st 8.875 lb (73.7 kg), 1 pound (0.5 kg) per rower more than their opponents. Archibald Levin Smith, Robert Wharton and Robert Lewis-Lloyd (who was rowing his third Boat Race for the Light Blues) had featured in Cambridge's 1857 crew. Oxford's crew included five participants who had competed in the previous race, including J. T. Thorley, who was making his third appearance in the event.

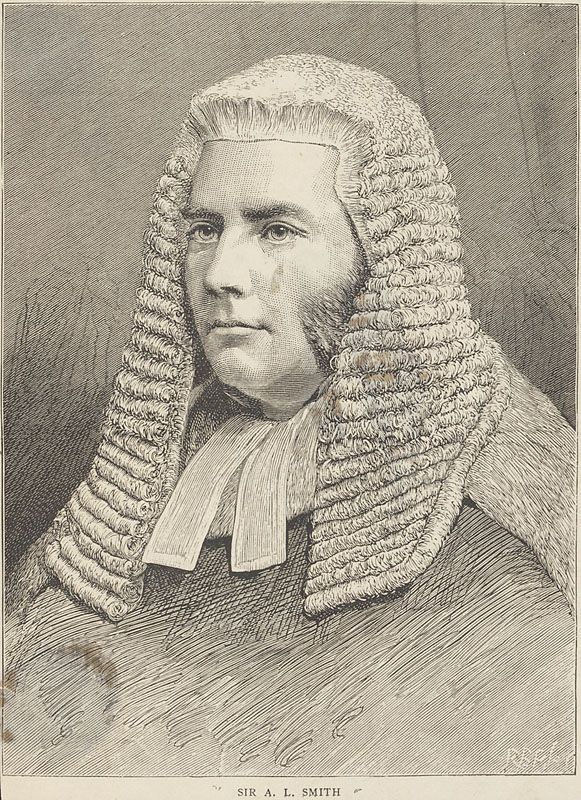
Archibald Levin Smith rowed at number two for Cambridge.

Seat	Cambridge			Oxford		
Seat	Name	College	Weight	Name	College	Weight
Bow	H. H. Lubbock	Gonville and Caius	11 st 4 lb	R. W. Risley	Exeter	11 st 8 lb
2	A. L. Smith	1st Trinity	11 st 4 lb	J. Arkell	Pembroke	11 st 3 lb
3	W. J. Havart	Lady Margaret Boat Club	11 st 4 lb	C. G. Lane	Christ Church	11 st 10 lb
4	D. Darroch	1st Trinity	12 st 1 lb	H. Austen	Magdalen	12 st 7 lb
5	H. Williams	Lady Margaret Boat Club	12 st 4 lb	E. Lane	Balliol	11 st 10 lb
6	R. L. Lloyd (P)	Magdalene	11 st 13 lb	W. H. Wood	University	12 st 0 lb
7	A. H. Fairbairn	2nd Trinity	11 st 12 lb	E. Warre	Balliol	13 st 2 lb
Stroke	J. Hall	Magdalene	10 st 7 lb	J. T. Thorley (P)	Wadham	10 st 3 lb
Cox	R. Wharton	Magdalene	9 st 2 lb	H. S. Walpole	Balliol	9 st 5 lb
Source: (P) – boat club president

== Race ==
The Championship Course along which the Boat Race is competed

Cambridge won the toss and elected to start from the Middlesex station, handing the Surrey side of the river to Oxford. The race commenced at 1 p.m. and almost immediately the Oxford boat club president and stroke J. T. Thorley "caught a crab" which "completely brought their eight to standstill." Cambridge took the lead but were caught following a clash of their port-side oars with a barge. The boats were level at the Crab Tree pub but here Cambridge began to draw ahead and passed under Hammersmith Bridge with a length-and-a-half lead. The Light Blues continued to increase their lead and passed the flag-boat at Mortlake 7 1/2 lengths ahead of Oxford in a time of 21 minutes 23 seconds.

It was the fastest time since the 1846 race (which was held on the ebb tide), and took the overall record in the event to 9–6 in Cambridge's favour. Although it was hoped that a rematch would be conducted at the Henley Royal Regatta, Oxford failed to make up a crew, and Cambridge went on to defeat Leander Club before winning the Grand Challenge Cup against London Rowing Club.
