= Richard Kindersley (rugby union) =

- Full name: Richard Stephen Kindersley
- Born: 27 September 1858 St Thomas, Devon, England
- Died: 26 September 1932 (aged 73) Beaminster, Dorset, England

Rugby union career
- Position: Forward
International career
Years	Team	Apps	(Points)
1882–85	England	3	(0)

Richard Stephen Kindersley (27 September 1858 – 26 September 1932) was an English rugby union player.

Born in St Thomas, Devon, Kindersley was the son of the Rector of Brampford Speke and attended Clifton College.

Kindersley gained blues for rowing and rugby while at Exeter College, Oxford. He played for Cambridge University RFC in two Varsity Matches and rowed in the Oxford eight from 1880 to 1882. A forward in rugby, Kindersley was the first player of Devon origins to be capped for England, making three international appearances.

Between 1888 and 1920, Kindersley was a master at Eton College.

== See also ==
- List of England national rugby union players
