= Alister Kirby =

British rower

Medal record

Men's rowing

Representing Great Britain

Olympic Games
Gold medal – first place	1912 Stockholm	Men's eight

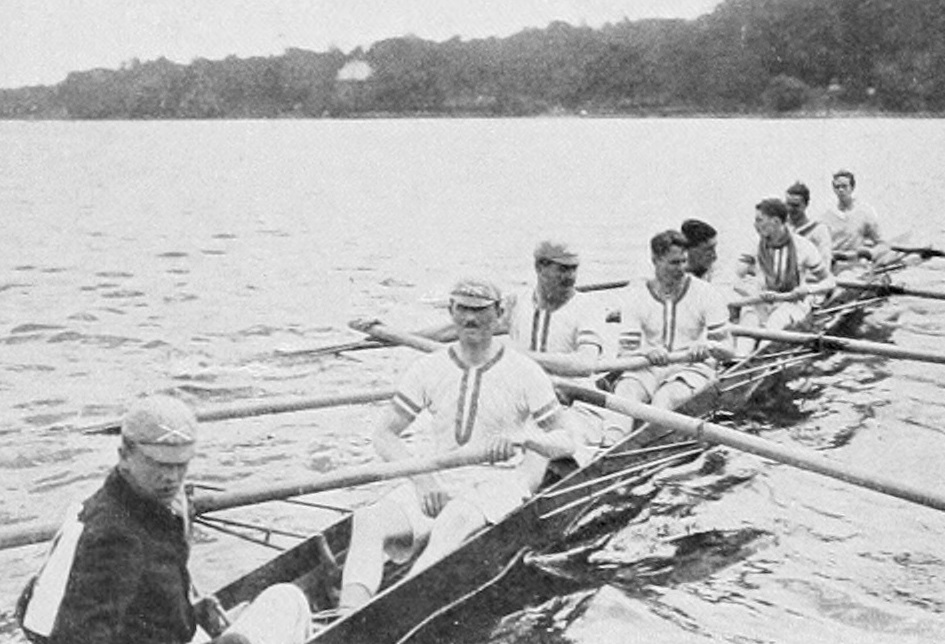
The British eights of the Leander Club at the 1912 Summer Olympics

Alister Graham Kirby (14 April 1886 – 29 March 1917) was a British rower who competed in the 1912 Summer Olympics. He died on service during the First World War.

Kirby was born at Brompton, West London, the son of Arthur Raymond Kirby, a Bencher of Lincoln's Inn and his wife Gertrude Fleming. He was educated at Eton College and Magdalen College, Oxford. He rowed for Oxford in the Boat Race in 1906, 1907, 1908, and 1909 but was only in the winning crew in his last year, 1909, when he was president. He was President of Vincent's Club in 1909. Kirby became a member of Leander Club and was captain of the Leander eight, which won the gold medal for Great Britain rowing at the 1912 Summer Olympics.

On the outbreak of World War I, he was commissioned into the Rifle Brigade and served as a captain. He died from illness in 1917, aged 30, and was buried at Mazargues War Cemetery, Marseille, France.

== See also ==
- List of Olympians killed in World War I
- List of Oxford University Boat Race crews
