= C.M. Pitman =

British barrister (1872–1948)

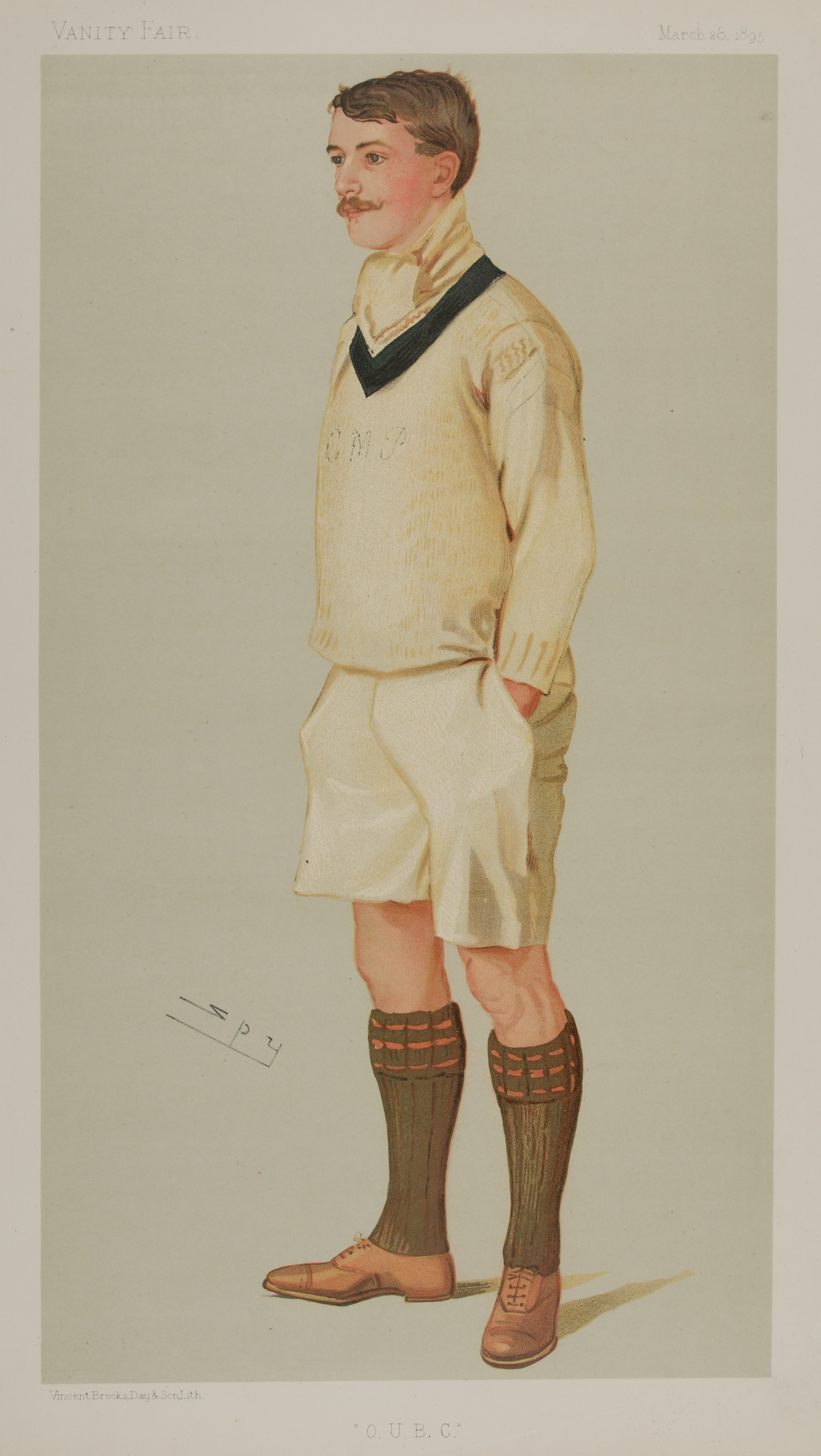
C.M. Pitman

Charles Murray Pitman KC JP (8 January 1872 – 13 October 1948) was a British judge and rower described in his Times obituary as having been known "in the rowing world ... one of the most distinguished oarsmen of his time".

The son of Frederick Pitman, he was one of 8 brothers, including Thomas Tait Pitman and Frederick I. Pitman. Pitman was educated at Eton and New College, Oxford, where he studied modern history. While at Oxford he stroked the university crew to four victories in the Boat Races of 1892, 1893, 1894 and 1895. He was called to the Bar in 1897 and was Judge Advocate of the Fleet and Recorder of Rochester 1924–33, then was a Referee of the Supreme Court of Judicature, 1933–45 and Chairman of the Berkshire Quarter Sessions, 1927–45. He was made a King's Counsel in 1925.

He married in 1909 Hilda Mary, daughter of Arthur Donkin.

He authored books on rowing.
