= Gilchrist Maclagan =

British coxswain

Medal record

Men's rowing

Representing Great Britain

Olympic Games
Gold medal – first place	1908 London	Eight

Gilchrist Stanley Maclagan (5 October 1879 – 25 April 1915) was a British rower who competed in the 1908 Summer Olympics. He was killed in action during the First World War.

Maclagan was born in London, the son of Dr. T. J. Maclagan. He was educated at Eton and Magdalen College, Oxford. When he was at Oxford University, he coxed the Oxford boat in the Boat Race for four years from 1899 to 1902. He joined Leander Club and coxed their boat at Henley Royal Regatta from 1899 to 1908. He set the record of being the only man to be in the winning crew in the Grand Challenge Cup six times. In 1908, he was cox of the Leander eight, which won the gold medal for Great Britain rowing at the 1908 Summer Olympics.

Maclagan became a member of the London Stock Exchange in 1904. In World War I, Maclagan served as a lieutenant in the Royal Warwickshire Regiment. He was killed in action in Pilckem Ridge, at the Second Battle of Ypres, aged 35, and is commemorated on the Menin Gate.

== See also ==
- List of Olympians killed in World War I
- List of Oxford University Boat Race crews
