= Charles Burnell =

British rower (1876–1969)

Medal record

Men's rowing

Representing Great Britain

Olympic Games
Gold medal – first place	1908 London	Eight

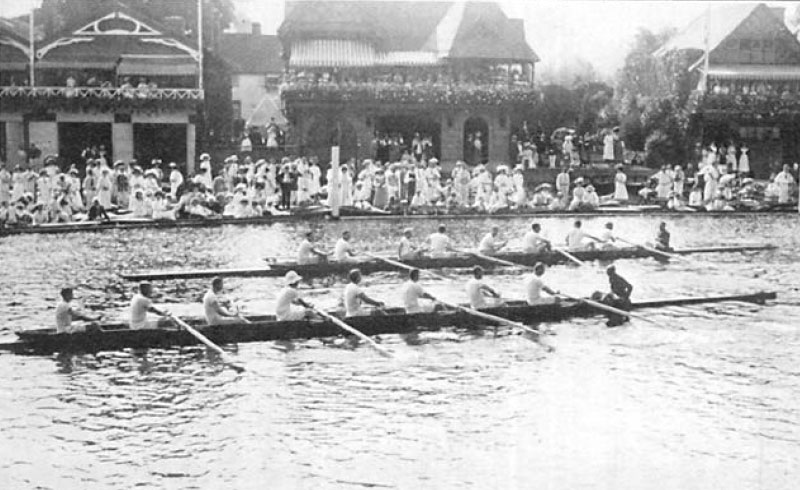
Eights - Great Britain (Leander Club) vs. Hungary - Summer Olympics 1908

Charles Desborough 'Don' Burnell, DSO, OBE (13 January 1876 – 3 October 1969) was a British rower who competed in the 1908 Summer Olympics.

== Biography ==
Burnell was born at Beckenham, then in Kent. He was educated at Eton College and Magdalen College, Oxford and was a member of the winning Oxford crews in the Boat Races of 1895, 1896, 1897 and 1898. He became a member of Leander Club and was in the Leander crew, which won the Grand Challenge Cup at Henley Royal Regatta for four consecutive years from 1898 to 1901. He was also a three-time winner of the Stewards' Challenge Cup at Henley. In 1908, he was a crew member of the Leander eight, which won the gold medal for Great Britain rowing at the 1908 Summer Olympics.

During World War I. Burnell served as a Lt Colonel in the London Rifle Brigade and won a DSO in 1918. After the war, he rejoined the family firm of stockbrokers in the city. He was Chairman of the Wokingham Rural District Council for 35 years. In 1954, he was awarded the OBE for public service in Berkshire.

He married Jessie Backhouse Hulke in 1903 in Kensington, London. They had four children and their son Richard Burnell was also an Olympic rower, winning a gold medal in 1948 in the double sculls.

Burnell died at Blewbury, Oxfordshire, at the age of 93 on 3 October 1969.

== See also ==
- List of Oxford University Boat Race crews
