= William Fletcher (rower) =

English oarsman and coach

William Alfred Littledale Fletcher, DSO (25 August 1869 – 14 February 1919) was both a successful English oarsman and coach, and soldier.

== Early life and education ==
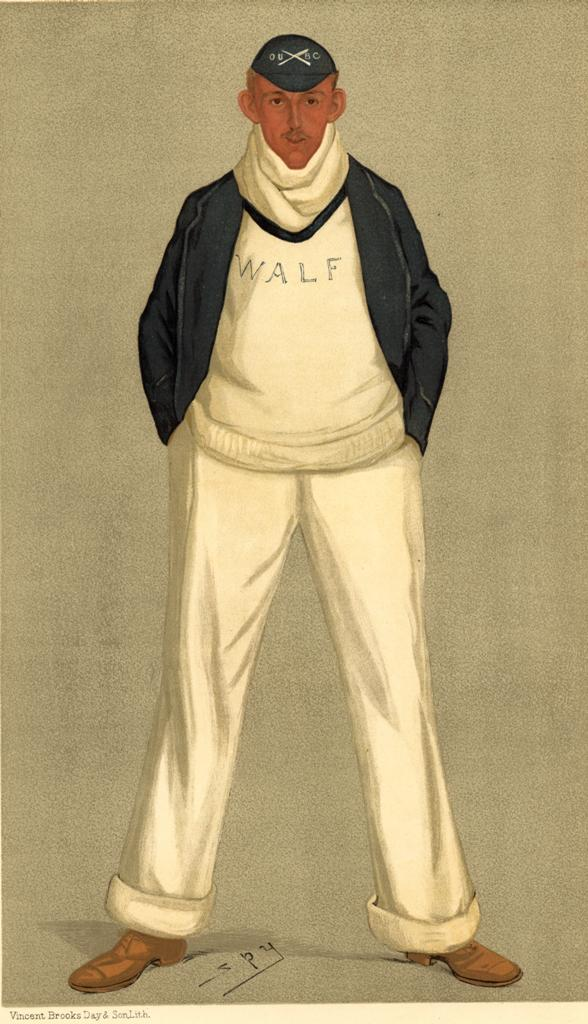
William Fletcher "Flea" (Vanity Fair caricatures)

Fletcher was born at Holly Bank, Green Lane, Wavertree, near Liverpool, the eldest son of Alfred Fletcher, a Director of the London and North-Western Railway. He was educated at Cheam School and Eton. He went up to Christ Church, Oxford where he rowed to win the Ladies' Challenge Plate and the Thames Cup at Henley Royal Regatta in 1889. In 1890 he stroked the Oxford Eight in the Boat Race to end a Cambridge run of four victories. He rowed in the 1891, 1892 and 1893 Boat Races. With Vivian Nickalls he won the Silver Goblets at Henley in 1892 and 1893 and both the Pairs and the Fours at Oxford. He rowed in winning Leander Club crews at Henley. He was a member of the Oxford Varsity Water Polo team and was on the Committee of Vincent's Club.

== Rowing career ==
Having access to considerable private wealth, Fletcher became a rowing coach. He had learned a technique at Oxford comprising a combination of swing and slide, together with a lightning entry, and he taught it to the Cambridge crews in 1898 and 1899, which led to the creation of a magnificent Cambridge crew in 1900. He missed coaching for the 1901 Boat Race as he was serving in the South African War. On return from South Africa he coached both the Oxford varsity crew and that of his old college, Christ Church, to great success and acclaim, reaching the peak of his fame as a coach. He afterwards coached many Oxford and House crews.

Fletcher was also a big game hunter and explorer. He went hunting and exploring in Siberia, Kenya, and Tibet.

== Military service ==
He became part of the patriotic volunteer movement at the beginning of 1900, joining the 32nd Company Imperial Yeomanry on 7 February 1900. The Company was raised in Lancashire by the Duke of Lancaster's Own Yeomanry Cavalry and The Lancashire Hussars. He was appointed Lieutenant and served with the 2nd Battalion Imperial Yeomanry in South Africa. On return home he relinquished his commission and was granted the honorary rank of lieutenant in the Army from 10 July 1901. He had proved to be a very successful officer and was Mentioned in Despatches (MID) twice. First on 7 May 1901 for valuable services rendered in connection with operations, and second on 10 September 1901 for special and meritorious service in South Africa. He was made a Companion of the Distinguished Service Order (DSO) on 27 September 1901.

He enlisted again on the outbreak of the Great War, joining the Territorial Force Reserve as a captain on 23 September 1914. He was appointed adjutant of the 6th (Rifle) Battalion The King's (Liverpool Regiment) on 10 November 1914; a position he held until 27 April 1915. On 6 August 1915 he was promoted temporary lieutenant-colonel and appointed commanding officer of the 2nd/6th Battalion, which was in training. It deployed to France on 14 February 1917, and he was one of the 457 casualties suffered by the battalion during the second mustard gas attack of the war, at Armentières on 29 July 1917. He had recovered sufficiently to return to duty on 11 September 1917. His successful command was recognized on 1 January 1918 when, as a captain (temporary lieutenant-colonel) he was appointed brevet major for distinguished service in the field. On 2 May 1918 the French honoured his service by the award of the Légion d'honneur, Croix de Chevalier.

== Death ==
"On the 23rd of July [1918], to everyone's regret, Lieutenant-Colonel W A L Fletcher proceeded to England, broken in health."

He became acting chairman of the Henley Regatta, putting forward a motion which was carried unanimously, to hold a scaled-down Regatta in the following summer. However, he never saw it to fruition, dying in the 1918 flu pandemic from broncho-pneumonia which caught hold in his gas-weakened lungs. He is buried in a family grave in St Nicholas Church-yard Halewood.

== See also ==
- List of Oxford University Boat Race crews
