= Felix Warre =

English rower

Felix Walter Warre, OBE, MC (1879–1953) was an English rower who won the Silver Goblets at Henley Royal Regatta.

Warre was born at Eton the son of Edmond Warre. His father was headmaster of Eton College and a successful rower. Warre was educated at Eton and Balliol College, Oxford. He rowed for Oxford in the Boat Race in 1898 and 1899. In 1901 he won the Silver Goblets at Henley Royal Regatta with J H Hale.

In 1914 Warre joined the Royal Garrison Artillery and served in the First World War becoming a major. He was awarded the OBE in 1919. He was later a banker and then an auctioneer at Sotheby's going on to be chairman.

Warre died at the age of 74.

Warre married Marjory Monteith Hamilton (daughter of Vereker Monteith Hamilton), and had two sons and three daughters, Richard Patrick Warre who was killed at Calais in 1940, Michael Hugh Warre who was a stage actor and set designer, Ursula Dorothy who married Peter Beaumont Earle, Barbera Marjorie who married Roy Henry Montague-Johnstone and Griselda who married William Terence Patrick Maffett.

== See also ==
- List of Oxford University Boat Race crews
