= Harcourt Gilbey Gold =

British rower

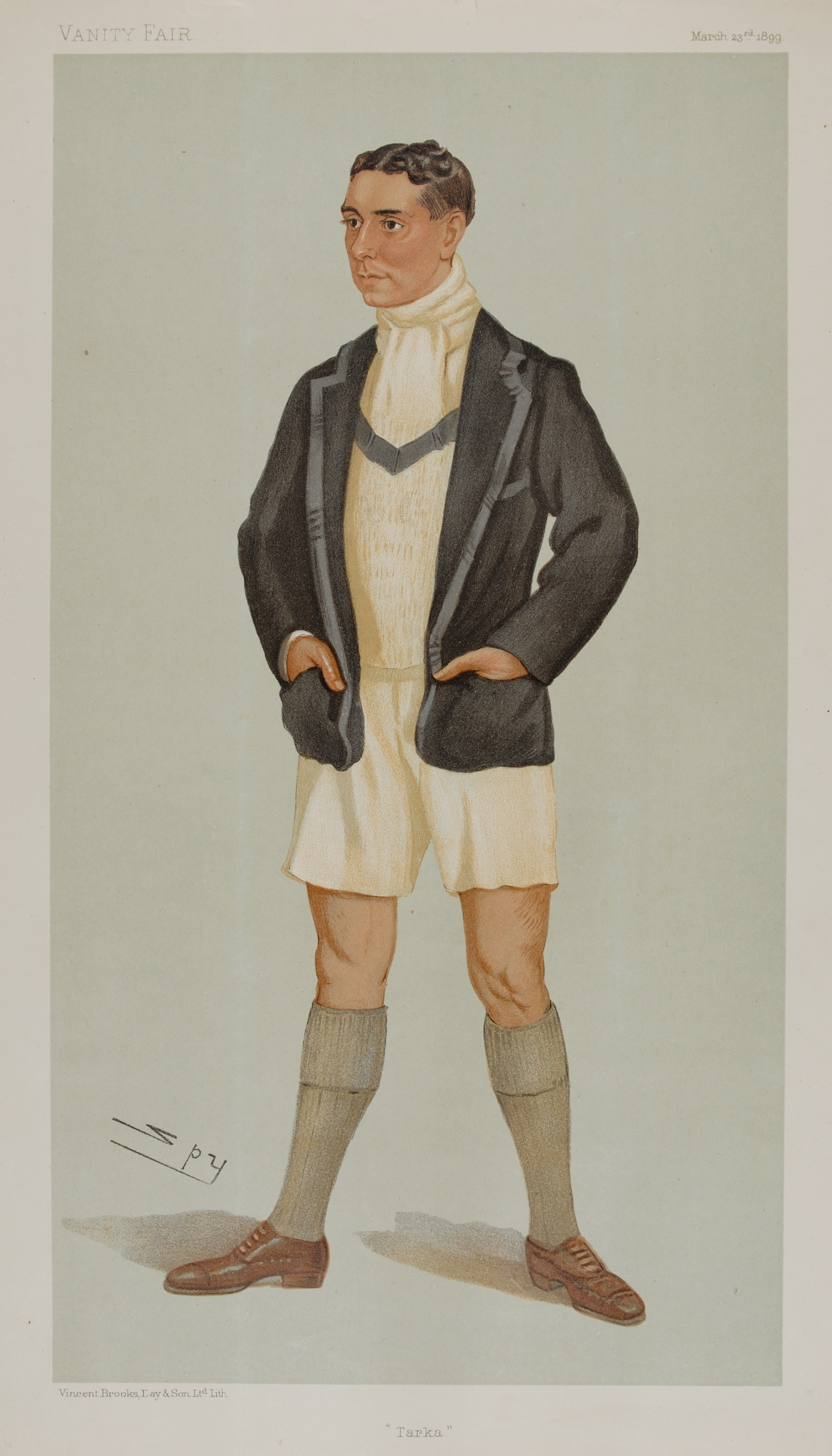
Gold caricatured by Spy for Vanity Fair, 1899

Sir Harcourt Gilbey Gold OBE (3 May 1876 – 27 July 1952) was a successful British rower, the first to be knighted for services to the sport.

He was born at Wooburn Green, Buckinghamshire, the ninth and youngest child of Henry Gold of Hedsor, Buckinghamshire, a director of W. and A. Gilbey, wine merchants. He was educated at Eton College, where he successfully took up rowing, stroking the Eton VIII to victory in the Ladies' Challenge Plate at Henley Royal Regatta for three successive years. In 1895 he went up to Magdalen College, Oxford, where he was made stroke of the University crew as a freshman. He successfully stroked Oxford to victory over Cambridge in the next three University Boat Races (and was also stroke in 1899 when they lost) and in 1898 was made president of the Oxford University Boat Club.

After leaving Oxford Gold was made Captain of Leander Club from 1898 to 1900. He became a steward of the Henley Regatta in 1909 and joined its management committee in 1919, significantly helping to put the event onto a sound financial footing. He coached eighteen Oxford crews as well as the Leander VIII which won the 1908 Olympic regatta at Henley. In 1948 he became chairman of the Amateur Rowing Association and in 1949 became the first person to be knighted for services to rowing.

During the First World War, he joined the Royal Flying Corps, became a lieutenant colonel and was awarded an OBE in the 1918 Birthday Honours. He set up in business as a stockbroker under the name of Harcourt Gold & Co.

He died in London on 27 July 1952. He had married Helen Beatrice, the daughter of Dr Thomas Maclagan of London. They had one son and two daughters. daughter Violet Dawn, married Henry George Coats Illingworth, son of Percy Illingworth.
