= Norway at the 1912 Summer Olympics =

- IOC code: NOR
- NOC: Central Association for the Dissemination of Sports

in Stockholm
- Competitors: 190 (188 men and 2 women) in 14 sports
- Medals Ranked 8th: Gold 3 Silver 2 Bronze 5 Total 10

Summer Olympics appearances (overview)
- 1900; ~~1904~~; 1908; 1912; 1920; 1924; 1928; 1932; 1936; 1948; 1952; 1956; 1960; 1964; 1968; 1972; 1976; 1980; 1984; 1988; 1992; 1996; 2000; 2004; 2008; 2012; 2016; 2020; 2024; 2028

Other related appearances
- 1906 Intercalated Games

Norway competed at the 1912 Summer Olympics in Stockholm, Sweden. 190 competitors, 188 men and 2 women, took part in 58 events in 14 sports.

== Medalists ==
Medal	Name	Sport	Event
Gold	Men's Team	Gymnastics	Men's team, free system
Gold	Alfred Larsen, Johan Anker, Nils Bertelsen, Halfdan Hansen, Magnus Konow, Petter Larsen, Eilert Falch-Lund, Christian Staib, Arnfinn Heje and Carl Thaulow	Sailing	Men's 12m class
Gold	Thoralf Glad, Thomas Aas, Andreas Brecke, Torleiv Corneliussen and Christian Jebe	Sailing	Men's 8m class
Silver	Ferdinand Bie	Athletics	Men's Pentathlon
Silver	Gudbrand Skatteboe, Ole Sæther, Østen Østensen, Albert Helgerud, Olaf Sæther and Einar Liberg	Shooting	Men's Team free rifle
Bronze	Men's Team	Gymnastics	Men's Team (Swedish system)
Bronze	Claus Høyer, Reidar Holter, Max Herseth, Frithjof Olstad and Olaf Bjørnstad (cox)	Rowing	Men's coxed fours, inriggers
Bronze	Theodor Klem, Henry Larsen, Håkon Tønsager, Mathias Torstensen and Ejnar Tønsager (cox)	Rowing	Men's coxed fours
Bronze	Engebret Skogen	Shooting	Men's 300m military rifle, three positions
Bronze	Molla Bjurstedt	Tennis	Women's singles outdoor

== Aquatics ==
=== Diving ===
Three divers, all men, represented Norway. It was Norway's debut in diving. None of the three divers reached the final in any of their events.

Rankings given are within the diver's heat.

Diver	Events	Heats		Final	
Diver	Events	Result	Rank	Result	Rank
Sigvard Andersen	10 m platform	56.4	5	Did not advance	
Sigvard Andersen	Plain high dive	28.6	7	Did not advance	
Alfred Engelsen	Plain high dive	28.3	7	Did not advance	
Nils Tvedt	Plain high dive	31.7	5	Did not advance	

=== Swimming ===
Five swimmers, including one woman, competed for Norway at the 1912 Games. It was the nation's debut in swimming. None of the Norwegian swimmers advanced to the finals, with Johnsen's sixth-place finish in his 400-metre freestyle semifinal the best result of the Games.

Ranks given for each swimmer are within the heat.

Men

Swimmer	Events	Heat		Quarterfinal		Semifinal		Final	
Swimmer	Events	Result	Rank	Result	Rank	Result	Rank	Result	Rank
John Johnsen	100 m freestyle	1:19.2	4	Did not advance					
John Johnsen	400 m freestyle	N/A		1:19.2	2 Q	Unknown	6	Did not advance	
John Johnsen	1500 m freestyle	N/A		25:45.6	3	Did not advance			
John Johnsen	100 m backstroke	N/A		1:34.2	4	Did not advance			
Audun Rusten	200 m breaststroke	N/A		Disqualified		Did not advance			
Harry Svendsen	100 m backstroke	N/A		1:47.2	3	Did not advance			
Herbert Wetter	1500 m freestyle	N/A		Did not finish		Did not advance			

Women

Swimmer	Events	Heat		Quarterfinal		Semifinal		Final	
Swimmer	Events	Result	Rank	Result	Rank	Result	Rank	Result	Rank
Aagot Norman	100 m freestyle	N/A		Did not finish		Did not advance			

== Athletics ==
23 athletes represented Norway. It was the nation's third appearance in the sport as well as the Olympics.

Ferdinand Bie, who had originally won the silver medal in the pentathlon, was awarded gold after Jim Thorpe was disqualified. When Thorpe was reinstated in 1982, Bie retained his gold medal in the event and became co-champions with Thorpe. In 2022, in consultation with surviving members of Bie's family, the IOC reinstated Thorpe as the sole winner of the event, as all his competitors had always wanted. Bie's medal was the only one won by Norway in athletics in 1912 and was the nation's second athletics gold medal. Arne Halse, who had previously held Norway's best athletics result with a silver medal in the 1908 javelin throw, placed 7th in the javelin and 5th in the two-handed version of the event. Norway also had two fourth-place finishes, in the triple jump and team cross country.

Ranks given are within that athlete's heat for running events.

Athlete	Events	Heat		Semifinal		Final	
Athlete	Events	Result	Rank	Result	Rank	Result	Rank
Ole Aarnæs	High jump	N/A		1.75	13	Did not advance	
Johannes Andersen	Ind. cross country	N/A				51:47.4	22
Ferdinand Bie	110 m hurdles	16.2	1 Q	15.8	3	Did not advance	
Ferdinand Bie	Long jump	N/A		6.75	11	Did not advance	
Ferdinand Bie	Pentathlon	N/A				21	2nd place, silver medalist(s)
Ferdinand Bie	Decathlon	N/A				6485.065	14
Birger Brodtkorb	Standing long jump	N/A		3.05	12	Did not advance	
Birger Brodtkorb	Standing high jump	N/A		1.40	13	Did not advance	
Nils Dahl	Ind. cross country	N/A				Did not finish	
Parelius Finnerud	Ind. cross country	N/A				51:16.2	20
Nils Fixdal	Long jump	N/A		6.71	13	Did not advance	
Nils Fixdal	Triple jump	N/A		13.96	8	Did not advance	
Oscar Fonbæk	Marathon	N/A				Did not finish	
Arne Halse	Javelin throw	N/A		51.98	7	Did not advance	
Arne Halse	2 hand javelin	N/A		96.92	5	Did not advance	
Olaf Hovdenak	Ind. cross country	N/A				50:40.8	19
Daniel Johansen	Javelin throw	N/A		47.61	12	Did not advance	
Daniel Johansen	2 hand javelin	N/A		92.82	7	Did not advance	
Edvard Larsen	Triple jump	N/A		14.06	6	Did not advance	
Oscar Larsen	800 m	?	3	Did not advance			
Oscar Larsen	1500 m	N/A		?	5	Did not advance	
Gerhard Meling	High jump	N/A		1.75	13	Did not advance	
Otto Monsen	High jump	N/A		1.75	13	Did not advance	
Alfred Nilsen	Marathon	N/A				Did not start	
Ole Olsen	Marathon	N/A				Did not start	
Otto Osen	Marathon	N/A				3:36:35.2	34
Alexander Pedersen	100 m	?	4	Did not advance			
Alexander Pedersen	400 m	Disqualified		Did not advance			
Jacob Pedersen	400 m	51.6	2 Q	?	5	Did not advance	
Jacob Pedersen	800 m	?	3	Did not advance			
Jacob Pedersen	1500 m	N/A		?	6–7	Did not advance	
Jacob Pedersen	Marathon	N/A				Did not start	
Axel Simonsen	Marathon	N/A				3:04:59.4	23
Herman Sotaaen	100 m	?	4	Did not advance			
Herman Sotaaen	200 m	?	3	Did not advance			
Erling Vinne	Triple jump	N/A		14.14	4	Did not advance	
Johannes Andersen; Parelius Finnerud; Olaf Hovdenak	Team cross country	N/A				61	4

== Cycling ==
Six cyclists represented Norway. It was the first appearance of the nation in cycling. Birgir Andreasen had the best time in the time trial, the only race held, finishing 14th. Because only three Norwegian cyclists finished the time trial, the team received no ranking in the four-man team competition.

=== Road cycling ===
Cyclist	Events	Final	
Cyclist	Events	Result	Rank
Birgir Andreasen	Ind. time trial	11:20:14.6	14
Carl Gulbrandsen	Ind. time trial	Did not finish	
Anton Hansen	Ind. time trial	12:21:23.7	65
Paul Henrichsen	Ind. time trial	11:55:23.2	47
Carl Olsen	Ind. time trial	Did not finish	
Martin Saeterhaug	Ind. time trial	Did not finish	
Birgir Andreasen; Anton Hansen; Paul Henrichsen; Gulbrandsen/Olsen/Saeterhaug	Team time trial	Did not finish	

== Equestrian ==
Dressage

Rider	Horse	Event	Final	
Rider	Horse	Event	Penalties	Rank
Jens Falkenberg	King	Individual	103	15

Jumping

Rider	Horse	Event	Final	
Rider	Horse	Event	Penalties	Rank
Jørgen Jensen	Joss	Individual	25	26
Karl Kildal	Garcia	Individual	22	24
Jens Falkenberg	Florida	Individual	29	28

== Fencing ==
Seven fencers represented Norway, including the only Norwegian fencer who had competed in 1908. It was the second appearance of the nation in fencing. None of the Norwegian fencers were able to advance past the quarterfinal round; however, advancement to quarterfinals was itself an improvement over the results of the previous Games.

Fencer	Event	Round 1		Quarterfinal		Semifinal		Final	
Fencer	Event	Record	Rank	Record	Rank	Record	Rank	Record	Rank
Lars Aas	Foil	4 losses	4	Did not advance					
Lars Aas	Épée	2 losses	1 Q	4 losses	6	Did not advance			
Hans Bergsland	Épée	4 losses	4	Did not advance					
Bjarne Eriksen	Foil	1 loss	1 Q	3 losses	4	Did not advance			
Bjarne Eriksen	Épée	3 losses	4	Did not advance					
Severin Finne	Épée	2 losses	3 Q	3 losses	6	Did not advance			
Sigurd Mathiesen	Épée	2 losses	3 Q	3 losses	4	Did not advance			
Harald Platou	Épée	3 losses	4	Did not advance					
Christopher von Tangen	Foil	5 losses	6	Did not advance					
Christopher von Tangen	Épée	3 losses	4	Did not advance					
Lars Aas; Hans Bergsland; Severin Finne; Georges von Tangen	Team épée	N/A		0–2	3	Did not advance			

== Football ==
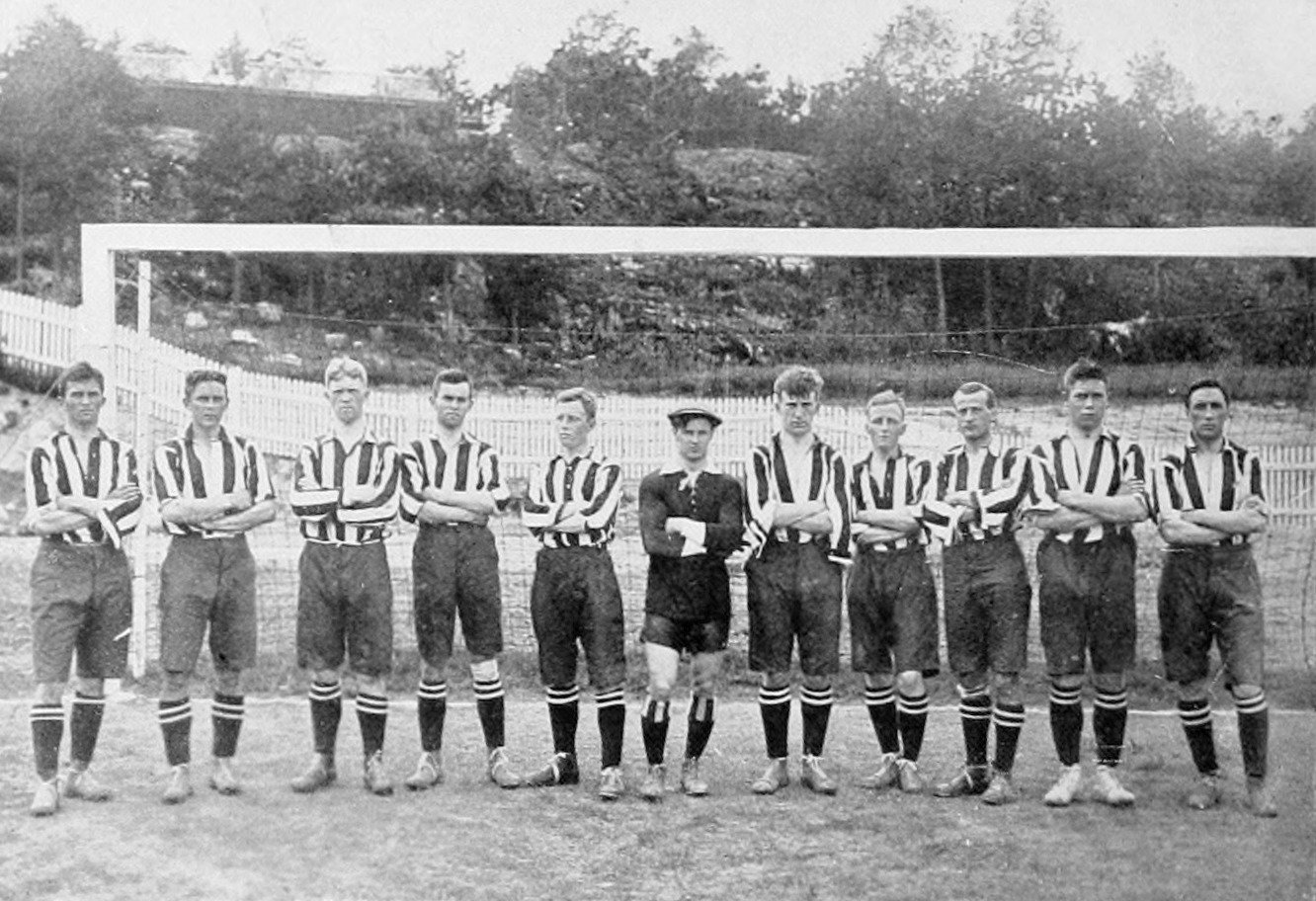
Norway's football squad

Squad list	1R	QF	Consolation tournament	Overall Rank
Squad list	Opposition Result	Opposition Result	Opposition Result	Overall Rank
From: Gunnar Andersen; Einar Friis Baastad; Hans Endrerud; Charles Herlofson; Sverre Jensen; Harald Johansen; Kristian Krefting; Erling Maartmann; Rolf Maartmann; Ingolf Pedersen; Henry Reinholdt; Per Skou	Bye	Denmark; Lost 7–0	Austria; Lost 1–0	9=

Quarterfinals

30 June 1912

Denmark	7–0	Norway
Olsen 4' 70' 88'; S. Nielsen 60' 85'; Wolfhagen 25'; Middelboe 37'

Råsunda Stadium, Stockholm
Attendance: 700

Consolation tournament

1 July 1912

Austria	1–0	Norway
Grundwald 2'

Traneberg Stadium, Stockholm
Attendance: 200

== Gymnastics ==
Forty-six gymnasts represented Norway. It was the second appearance of the nation in gymnastics. Norway had no gymnasts in the individual competition, but had teams in two of the three team events. In the free system even, the Norwegian team took first place to earn the country's first gymnastics gold medal. The team finished third and last in the Swedish system, taking the bronze medal.

=== Artistic ===
Gymnast	Events	Final	
Gymnast	Events	Result	Rank
Norway	Team, free system	22.85	1st place, gold medalist(s)
Norway	Team, Swedish system	857.21	3rd place, bronze medalist(s)

== Modern pentathlon ==
Norway had two competitors in the first Olympic pentathlon competition. Paaske finished 13th among the 22 finishers, while Norby was among the ten pentathletes who did not finish.

(The scoring system was point-for-place in each of the five events, with the smallest point total winning.)

Athlete	Shooting		Swimming		Fencing			Riding			Running		Total points	Rank
Athlete	Score	Points	Time	Points	Wins	Touches	Points	Penalties	Time	Points	Time	Points	Total points	Rank
Henrik Norby	110	27	7:48.6	21	14	17	12	Disqualified			Retired		Did not finish	
Carl Paaske	147	23	6:49.2	17	13	15	14	0	12:33.0	14	21:19.8	8	71	13

== Rowing ==
Twenty four rowers represented Norway. It was the nation's second appearance in rowing. The Norwegians took two bronze medals; it were Norway's first Olympic medals in rowing.

(Ranks given are within each crew's heat.)

Rower	Event	Heats		Quarterfinals		Semifinals		Final	
Rower	Event	Result	Rank	Result	Rank	Result	Rank	Result	Rank
John Bjørnstad (cox); Hannibal Fegth; Gunnar Grantz; Gustav Hæhre; Olaf Solberg	Coxed four, inriggers	N/A		Unknown	2	Did not advance			
Olav Bjørnstad (cox); Max Herseth; Reidar Holter; Claus Høyer; Frithjof Olstad	Coxed four, inriggers	N/A		8:03.0	1 Q	Unknown	2	Did not advance ( (bronze) )	
Olaf Dahll; Øyvin Davidsen; Einar Eriksen (cox); Leif Rode; Theodor Schjøth	Coxed four	7:27.4	1 Q	Unknown	2	Did not advance			
Ejnar Tønsager (cox); Theodor Klem; Henry Larsen; Håkon Tønsager; Mathias Torstensen	Coxed four	7:15.0	1 Q	7:05.5	1 Q	7:05.0	2	Did not advance ( (bronze) )	
John Bjørnstad (cox); Hannibal Fegth; Gunnar Grantz; Gustav Hæhre; Harald Herlofson; Thomas Høie; Otto Krogh; Olaf Solberg; Einar Sommerfeldt	Eight	Unknown	2	Did not advance					

== Sailing ==
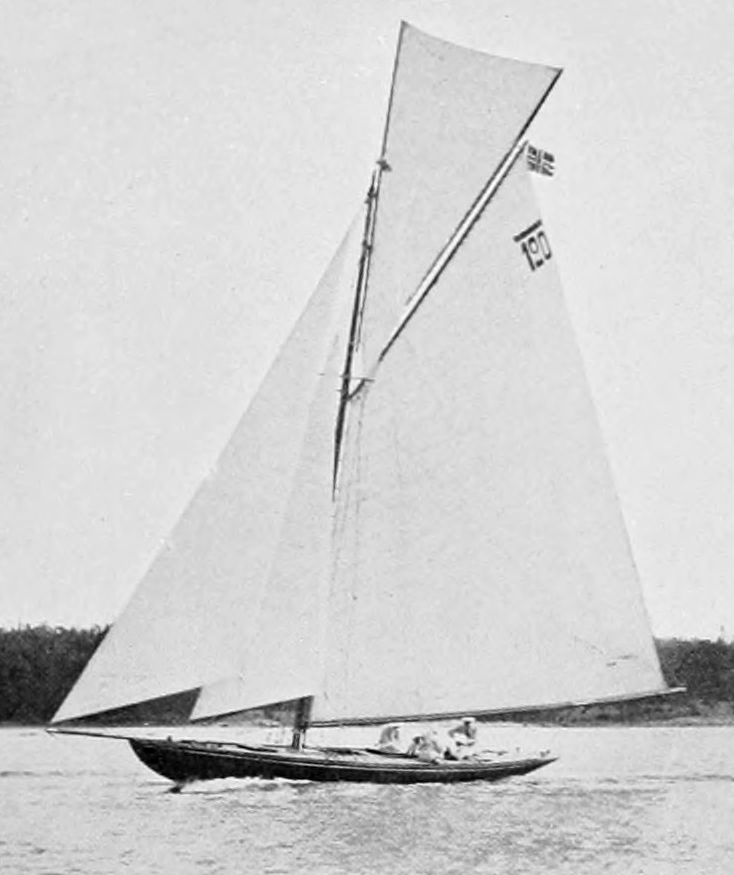
Taifun, Norway's 8 m gold-winning 8 m class boat

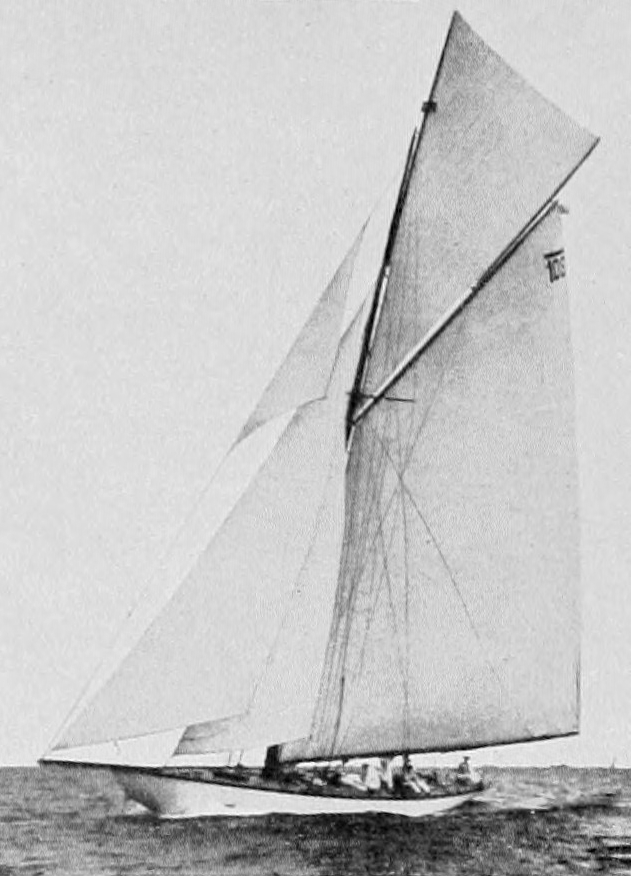
Magda IX, Norway's gold-winning 12 m class boat

Eighteen sailors represented Norway. It was the nation's second appearance in sailing. Each of the Norwegian boats found either great success or an utter lack thereof. Two of the three boats won each race in their respective classes to take gold medals without any need for race-offs; these two gold medals were the first medals of any sort Norwegian sailors had won. The third boat, on the other hand, placed fifth (of six) in both of its two races and did not score a single point.

(7 points for 1st in each race, 3 points for 2nd, 1 point for 3rd. Race-off to break ties in total points if necessary for medal standings.)

Sailors	Event	Race 1			Race 2			Total		
Sailors	Event	Time	Points	Rank	Time	Points	Rank	Points	Race-off	Rank
Edvard Christensen; Eigil Christiansen; Hans Christiansen	6 metre class	2:39:48	0	5	2:30:39	0	5	0	N/A	5
Thomas Aas; Andreas Brecke; Torleiv Corneliussen; Thoralf Glad; Christian Jebe	8 metre class	2:15:59	7	1	2:12:59	7	1	14	N/A	1st place, gold medalist(s)
Johan Anker; Nils Bertelsen; Eilert Falch-Lund; Halfdan Hansen; Arnfinn Heje; Magnus Konow; Alfred Larsen; Petter Larsen; Christian Staib; Carl Thaulow	12 metre class	3:17:17	7	1	3:32:00	7	1	14	N/A	1st place, gold medalist(s)

== Shooting ==
Twenty eight shooters competed for Norway. It was the third appearance of the nation in shooting, which Norway had contested each time the nation appeared at the Olympics. The Norwegian shooters won a pair of medals—a silver in the team free rifle and Skogen's bronze in the three positions military rifle. This was a comparatively disappointing result, as the Norwegians had taken a pair of gold medals and a bronze in 1908 and four total medals (though no golds) in 1900.

Shooter	Event	Final	
Shooter	Event	Result	Rank
Ole Bjerke	300 m military rifle, 3 pos.	61	80
Søren Bough	600 m free rifle	40	82
Julius Braathe	300 m free rifle, 3 pos.	900	29
Julius Braathe	300 m military rifle, 3 pos.	88	15
Carsten Henrik Bruun	Trap	74	27
Ole Degnes	600 m free rifle	84	17
Johannes Espelund	300 m military rifle, 3 pos.	60	81
Mathias Glomnes	300 m military rifle, 3 pos.	82	35
Albert Helgerud	300 m free rifle, 3 pos.	952	7
Albert Helgerud	600 m free rifle	74	47
Albert Helgerud	300 m military rifle, 3 pos.	75	55
Olaf Husby	300 m free rifle, 3 pos.	905	27
Ole Jensen	600 m free rifle	73	56
Johannes Jordell	50 m rifle, prone	172	35
Johannes Jordell	300 m military rifle, 3 pos.	80	41
Einar Liberg	300 m free rifle, 3 pos.	921	15
Birger Lie	300 m military rifle, 3 pos.	59	82
Ragnvald Maseng	50 m rifle, prone	156	40
Ragnvald Maseng	600 m free rifle	73	55
Hans Nordvik	600 m free rifle	79	35
Østen Østensen	300 m free rifle, 3 pos.	911	23
Thomas Refsum	300 m free rifle, 3 pos.	905	26
Thomas Refsum	600 m free rifle	76	41
Frantz Rosenberg	Trap	81	23
Olaf Sæther	300 m free rifle, 3 pos.	914	18
Ole Sæther	300 m free rifle, 3 pos.	941	9
Ole Sæther	600 m free rifle	70	60
Gudbrand Skatteboe	300 m free rifle, 3 pos.	956	5
Gudbrand Skatteboe	600 m free rifle	77	40
Herman Skjerven	300 m military rifle, 3 pos.	71	62
Engebret Skogen	300 m free rifle, 3 pos.	899	31
Engebret Skogen	300 m military rifle, 3 pos.	95	3rd place, bronze medalist(s)
Alfred Stabell	Trap	3	61
Arne Sunde	50 m rifle, prone	176	30
Arne Sunde	300 m free rifle, 3 pos.	900	30
Arne Sunde	600 m free rifle	80	30
Arne Sunde	300 m military rifle, 3 pos.	80	44
Alfred Thielemann	600 m free rifle	57	75
Alfred Thielemann	300 m military rifle, 3 pos.	62	76
Paul Vighals	300 m free rifle, 3 pos.	911	22
Paul Vighals	600 m free rifle	72	57
Carl Weydahl	300 m military rifle, 3 pos.	40	89
Ole Degnes; Mathias Glomnes; Olaf Husby; Ole Jensen; Hans Nordvik; Arne Sunde	Team rifle	1473	6
Albert Helgerud; Einar Liberg; Østen Østensen; Olaf Sæther; Ole Sæther; Gudbrand Skatteboe	Team free rifle	5602	2nd place, silver medalist(s)

== Tennis ==
Seven tennis players, including one woman, represented Norway at the 1912 Games. It was the nation's debut in tennis. Despite a combined record of 1–10 by the Norwegian tennis players, Bjurstedt took a bronze medal after receiving byes through to the semifinals in the women's outdoor singles. Her win in the bronze medal match after being defeated in the semi gave Norway its first tennis medal.

Men

Athlete	Event	Round of 128	Round of 64	Round of 32	Round of 16	Quarterfinals	Semifinals	Final	
Athlete	Event	Opposition Score	Opposition Score	Opposition Score	Opposition Score	Opposition Score	Opposition Score	Opposition Score	Rank
Herman Björklund	Outdoor singles	Bye	Kreuzer (GER); L 6–0, 6–0, 6–1	Did not advance					31
Conrad Langaard	Outdoor singles	Bye	Canet (FRA); L 6–3, 6–0, 6–1	Did not advance					31
Richard Petersen	Outdoor singles	Bye	von Salm (AUT); L 6–1, 7–5, 6–3	Did not advance					31
Trygve Smith	Outdoor singles	Bye	Boström (SWE); L 6–2, 6–4, 6–1	Did not advance					31
Willem Stibolt	Outdoor singles	Bye	Bye	Šebek (BOH); L 6–1, 6–3, 6–0	Did not advance				17
Bjarne Angell; Willem Stibolt	Outdoor doubles	N/A		Just & Žemla (BOH); L 6–1, 6–2, 6–0	Did not advance				15
Herman Björklund; Trygve Smith	Outdoor doubles	N/A		Pipes & Zborzil (AUT); L 6–0, 6–2, 6–0	Did not advance				15
Conrad Langaard; Richard Petersen	Outdoor doubles	N/A		Bye	Just & Žemla (BOH); L 6–1, 6–2, 6–4	Did not advance			9

Women

Athlete	Event	Round of 16	Quarterfinals	Semifinals	Final	
Athlete	Event	Opposition Score	Opposition Score	Opposition Score	Opposition Score	Rank
Molla Bjurstedt	Outdoor singles	Bye	Bye	Broquedis (FRA); W 6–3, 2–6, 6–4	Arnheim (SWE); L 6–2, 6–2	3rd place, bronze medalist(s)

Mixed

Athlete	Event	Round of 16	Quarterfinals	Semifinals	Final	
Athlete	Event	Opposition Score	Opposition Score	Opposition Score	Opposition Score	Rank
Molla Bjurstedt; Conrad Langaard	Outdoor doubles	Grönfors & Holmström (SWE); L 6–4, 4–6, 7–5	Did not advance			5

== Wrestling ==
=== Greco-Roman ===
Norway was represented by nine wrestlers in its second Olympic wrestling appearance. Lofthus's 11th-place finish was the best. The team went a combined 8–18.

Wrestler	Class	First round	Second round	Third round	Fourth round	Fifth round	Sixth round	Seventh round	Final			
Wrestler	Class	Opposition Result	Opposition Result	Opposition Result	Opposition Result	Opposition Result	Opposition Result	Opposition Result	Match A Opposition Result	Match B Opposition Result	Match C Opposition Result	Rank
Kristian Arneson	Featherweight	Beránek (BOH); W	Pawłowicz (RUS); L	Beckman (SWE); L	Did not advance							19
Richard Frydenlund	Lightweight	Lupton (GBR); W	Ruff (GBR); W	Balej (BOH); L	Salonen (FIN); L	Did not advance						17
Thorbjørn Frydenlund	Lightweight	Fischer (AUT); L	Svenson (SWE); L	Did not advance								31
Ragnvald Gullaksen	Featherweight	Persson (SWE); W	Beckman (SWE); L	Lasanen (FIN); L	Did not advance							19
Alfred Gundersen	Middleweight	Jokinen (FIN); L	Did not start	Did not advance								37
Mikael Hestdahl	Featherweight	Åkesson (SWE); W	Öberg (SWE); L	Lehmusvirta (FIN); L	Did not advance							19
Herbrand Lofthus	Lightweight	Cabal (FRA); W	Dumrauf (GER); W	Nilsson (SWE); L	Saeurhöfer (GER); W	Mathiasson (SWE); L	Did not advance					11
Ansgar Løvold	Light heavyweight	Lind (FIN); L	Barl (AUT); L	Did not advance				N/A	Did not advance			20
Thorvald Olsen	Lightweight	Kolehmainen (FIN); L	Tanttu (FIN); L	Did not advance								31
