= Rowing at the 1912 Summer Olympics =

Rowing at the Games of the V Olympiad
- Venue: Djurgårdsbrunnsviken
- Dates: 17–19 July 1912
- Competitors: 185 from 14 nations

Rowing at the 1912 Summer Olympics featured four events, for men only. All races were held in Djurgårdsbrunnsviken from Thursday to Saturday, 17 to 19 July.

== Medal summary ==
Event	Gold	Silver	Bronze
Single Sculls	Wally Kinnear; Great Britain	Polydore Veirman; Belgium	Everard Butler; Canada; Mart Kuusik; Russian Empire
Coxed four	Germany; Albert Arnheiter; Hermann Wilker; Rudolf Fickeisen; Otto Fickeisen; Karl Leister	Great Britain; Julius Beresford; Karl Vernon; Charles Rought; Bruce Logan; Geoffrey Carr	Denmark; Erik Bisgaard; Rasmus Frandsen; Mikael Simonsen; Poul Thymann; Ejgil Clemmensen; Norway; Henry Larsen; Mathias Torstensen; Theodor Klem; Håkon Tønsager; Ejnar Tønsager
Coxed four, Inriggers	Denmark; Ejler Allert; Christian Hansen; Carl Møller; Carl Pedersen; Poul Hartmann	Sweden; Ture Rosvall; William Bruhn-Möller; Conrad Brunkman; Herman Dahlbäck; Leo Wilkens	Norway; Claus Høyer; Reidar Holter; Max Herseth; Frithjof Olstad; Olav Bjørnstad
Eights	Great Britain; Leander Edgar Burgess; Sidney Swann; Leslie Wormald; Ewart Horsfall; James Angus Gillan; Stanley Garton; Alister Kirby; Philip Fleming; Henry Wells	Great Britain; New College, Oxford William Fison; William Parker; Thomas Gillespie; Beaufort Burdekin; Frederick Pitman; Arthur Wiggins; Charles Littlejohn; Robert Bourne; John Walker	Germany; Berlin Otto Liebing; Max Bröske; Max Vetter; Willi Bartholomae; Fritz Bartholomae; Werner Dehn; Rudolf Reichelt; Hans Matthiae; Kurt Runge

== Bronze medals ==
Bronze medals were not awarded to the losing semi finalists in any of the events, they were instead given diplomas of merit. Although the IOC database currently includes bronze medallists for every event, it is not certain if this an oversight on their behalf or if a retrospective change has been made.

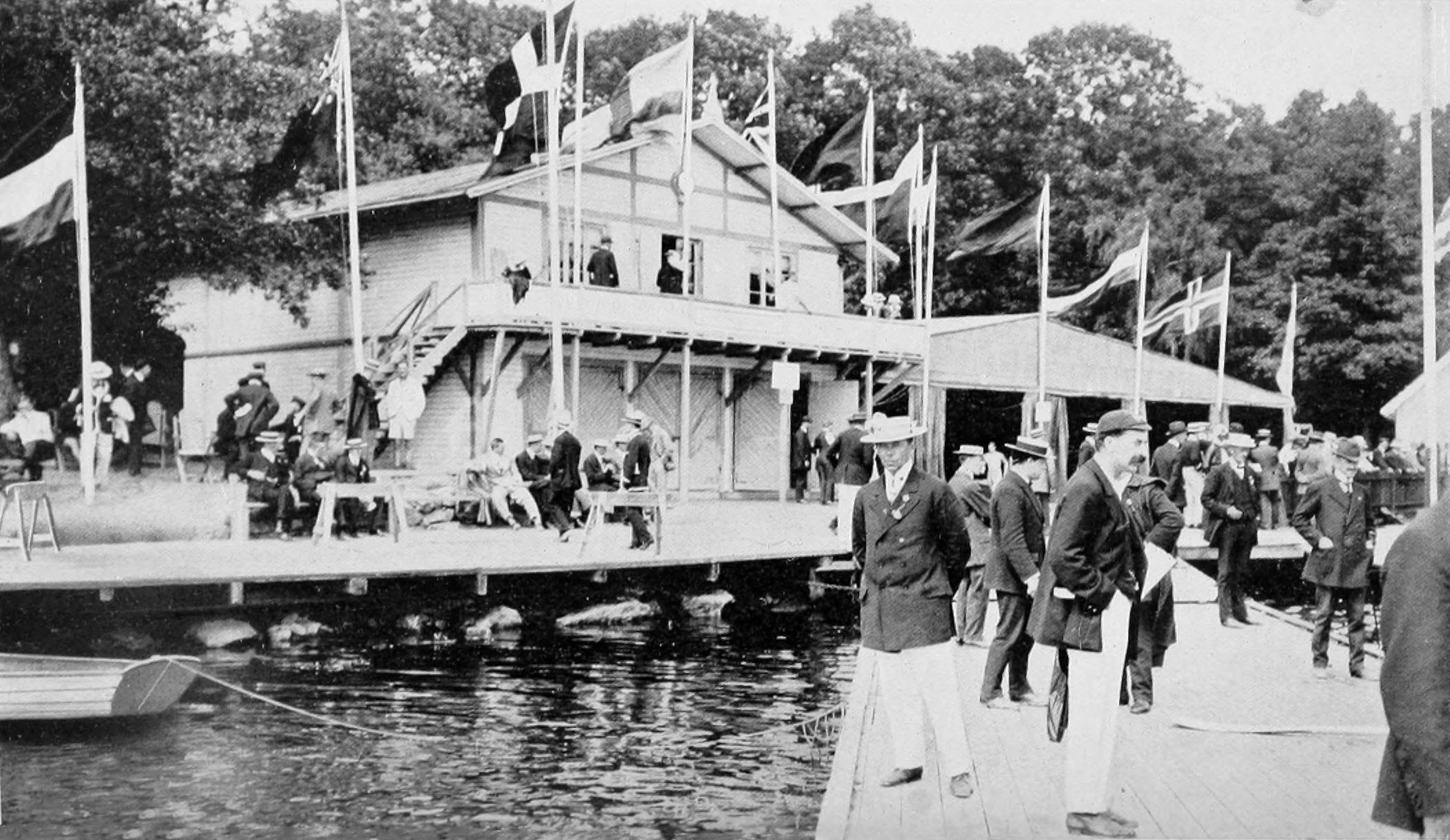
The Stockholm rowing club's boat house.

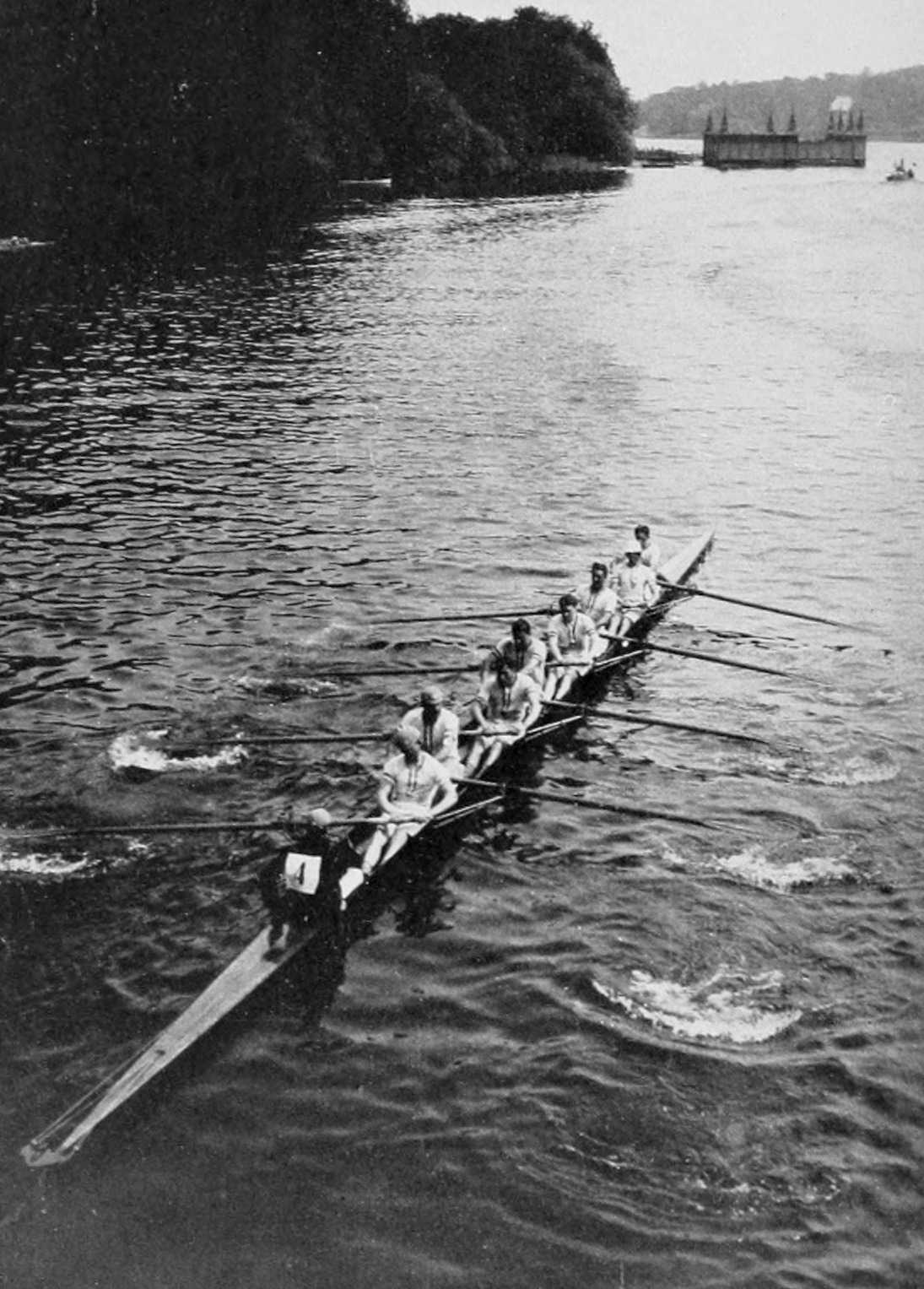
The British eights of the Leander Club.

== Amateur definitions ==
The definition for the rowing competitions was:

An amateur is one:

- who has never received payment as a trainer;
- who has never competed for money prizes;
- who has never competed or given a display for payment;
- who has never competed, or given a display, against a professional;
- who has never drawn any pecuniary gain from athletic exercises by selling, exchanging, pawning, or hiring out any prize won in a competition.

An amateur shall be allowed, when taking part in races or displays, to receive his travelling and hotel expenses from the club to which he belongs, or, with the consent of the said club, from the club arranging the competition or display, without forfeiting his amateur status. Payment for such a journey, however, may be made only through the club which he represents in the said competition. No competitor shall be allowed to make any pecuniary gain or profit from such payment.

A professional shall not be allowed to take part in any competitions or displays for amateurs, neither may he officiate as judge or in any other capacity. A professional is one who as a seaman, fisherman, or in any other capacity, has in any way, in the exercise of his calling, engaged in rowing within two years previous to the date of competition.

== Participating nations ==
A total of 185(*) rowers from 14 nations competed at the Stockholm Games:

- Australasia (10)
- Austria (6)
- Belgium (6)
- Bohemia (1)
- Canada (10)
- Denmark (15)
- Finland (6)
- France (17)
- Germany (26)(*)
- Great Britain (24)
- Hungary (11)
- Norway (24)
- Russian Empire (1)
- Sweden (28)

(*) NOTE: Both German coxswains from the coxed fours event are counted.

== Medal table ==
Rank	Nation	Gold	Silver	Bronze	Total
1	Great Britain	2	2	0	4
2	Denmark	1	0	1	2
2	Germany	1	0	1	2
4	Belgium	0	1	0	1
4	Sweden	0	1	0	1
6	Norway	0	0	2	2
7	Canada	0	0	1	1
7	Russia	0	0	1	1
Totals (8 entries)		4	4	6	14
