= Ormsund RK =

Norwegian rowing club

Ormsund Roklub is a rowing club from Oslo, Norway.

Established on 21 July 1883, it is based on Malmøya in the Oslofjord, outside Bekkelaget. Well-known members include the 1912 Olympic bronze winners Claus Høyer, Reidar Holter, Max Herseth, Frithjof Olstad and Olaf Bjørnstad, and the post-war rowers Alf Hansen, Frank Hansen, Lars Bjønness, Magnus Grepperud, Svein Thøgersen and Peter Wærness.
