= Herlofson =

Herlofson is a surname. Notable people with the surname include:

- Axel Nicolai Herlofson (1845–1910), Norwegian fraudster
- Charles Herlofson (1891–1968), Norwegian footballer
- Charles Oluf Herlofson (1916–1984), Norwegian naval officer
- Harald Herlofson (1887–1957), Norwegian admiral
