= Gabrielsen =

Gabrielsen is a surname. Notable people with the Norwegian surname include:

- Alexander Gabrielsen (born 1985), football player
- Ansgar Gabrielsen (born 1955), Norwegian politician and consultant
- Elias Gabrielsen (1888–1973), Norwegian trade unionist, newspaper editor and politician
- Gabriel Gabrielsen Holtsmark (1867–1954), Norwegian educator, physicist and actuary
- Gøhril Gabrielsen (born 1961), Norwegian writer
- Hans Gabrielsen (1891–1965), Norwegian jurist and politician
- Hans-Christian Gabrielsen (born 1967), Norwegian industrial worker, politician and trade unionist
- Jørgen Gabrielsen (born 1935), Danish sports shooter
- Odd Stokke Gabrielsen (born 1951), Norwegian biochemist
- Ole Gabriel Gabrielsen Ueland (1799–1870), Norwegian politician
- Romund Gabrielsen (1917–1971), British swimmer
- Ruben Gabrielsen (born 1992), Norwegian football player
- Valter Gabrielsen (1921–1999), Norwegian politician

== See also ==
- Bache-Gabrielsen, brand of cognac that is over 110 years old
- Broder Gabrielsen, a 1966 Norwegian drama film
- Gabrielsen Natatorium, swimming and diving facility at the University of Georgia (UGA) in Athens, Georgia, US
- Gabriel
- Gabrielsson
