= Gabrielsson =

Gabrielsson is a surname. Notable people with the surname include:

- Erik Gabrielsson Emporagrius (1606–1674), Swedish professor and bishop
- Assar Gabrielsson (1891–1962), Swedish industrialist and co-founder of Volvo
- Astrid Gabrielsson (born 1987), Swedish sports sailor
- Axel Gabrielsson (1886–1975), Swedish rower who competed in the 1912 Summer Olympics
- Charles Gabrielsson (1884–1976), Swedish rower who competed in the 1912 Summer Olympics
- Eva Gabrielsson (born 1953), Swedish architect, author, political activist, feminist, partner of Stieg Larsson
- Gunnar Gabrielsson (1891–1981), Swedish sport shooter who competed in the 1920 Summer Olympics
- K. J. Gabrielsson (1861–1901), Swedish socialist writer and poet
- Nils Gabrielsson (1876–1948), Swedish politician
- Thomas W. Gabrielsson (born 1963), Swedish actor, active in Sweden and Denmark
- Bengt Gabrielsson Oxenstierna (1623–1702), Swedish statesman

== See also ==
- Gabrielson
