= Rowing at the 1912 Summer Olympics – Men's coxed four, inriggers =

Men's coxed fours with inriggers at the Games of the V Olympiad
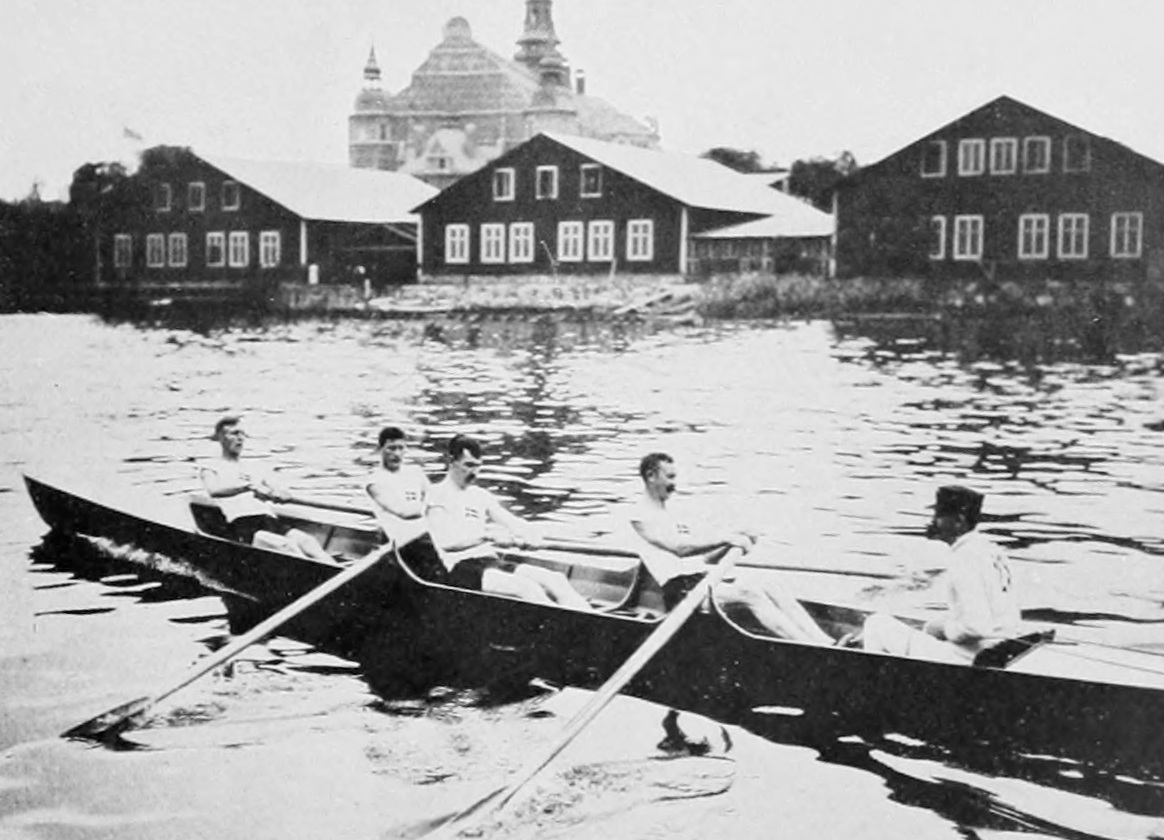
- The winning team of the Nykjøbings paa Falster Roklub.
- Venue: Djurgårdsbrunnsviken
- Dates: 17 July 1912 (quarterfinals, semifinals); 18 July 1912 (final)
- Competitors: 30 from 4 nations

Medalists
1st place, gold medalist(s)		Nykjøbings paa Falster; Denmark
2nd place, silver medalist(s)		Roddklubben af 1912; Sweden
3rd place, bronze medalist(s)		Ormsund RK; Norway

The men's coxed fours with inriggers, also referred to as the coxed four with jugriggers, was a rowing event held as part of the Rowing at the 1912 Summer Olympics programme. It was the only appearance of the restricted event. The competition was held on Wednesday and Thursday, 17 and 18 July 1912. Thirty rowers from four nations competed.

== Starting list ==
The following boats and/or rowing clubs participated:

- Denmark Nykjøbings paa Falster Roklub
- France Société Nautique de Bayonne
- Norway Christiania Roklub
- Norway Ormsund Roklub
- Sweden Göteborgs Roddförening
- Sweden Roddklubben af 1912

== Results ==
=== Quarterfinals ===
All quarterfinals were held on Wednesday, 17 July 1912.

Quarterfinal 1: 11 a.m. Both boats got well away, the Norwegians leading for the first hundred metres or so. Then the Swedish, who were rowing a somewhat quicker stroke, began to creep up, and soon passed their opponents, obtaining a lead which they retained for the rest of the race. The winning crew pulling from 32–38 a minute, the Norwegian stroke varying between 28 and 38. Both boats were very well rowed, and it was physical strength that gave Sweden the victory.

Quarterfinal 1
Place	Boat	Bow	Rower No.2	Rower No.3	Stroke	Cox	Time	Qual.
1	Roddklubben af 1912 (SWE)	Ture Rosvall	William Bruhn-Möller	Conrad Brunkman	Herman Dahlbäck	Leo Wilkens	7:51.5	QS
2	Christiania (NOR)	Gunnar Grantz	Olaf Solberg	Gustav Hæhre	Hannibal Fegth	John Bjørnstad		

Quarterfinal 2: 11.20 a.m. At the start, Sweden led with an energetic stroke of 36, while the Danes rowed a longer but very effective stroke, which they used to perfection. The forward half of the stroke was one of extraordinary length, with a fine finish and excellent carriage of the hands. The way the crew rowed like one man was beyond all praise, and the four showed that it fully deserved its great reputation. The Swedish crew also made a very good impression and was only a little worse than its Danish rival; most noteworthy, perhaps, was the energetic stubbornness with which the Swedes defended the lead they succeeded in gaining at the start. The Danish crew was in better training, however, and the Swedes were not able to maintain their position when the Danes – who had the inner curve at the bath-house – began their spurt. Surely and irresistibly the Danish boat came up to, and passed, the Swedish, which, although at Djurgård Bridge, it had the advantage of the inner curve, could make no use of its position, but was beaten by one and a half length.

Quarterfinal 2
Place	Boat	Bow	Rower No.2	Rower No.3	Stroke	Cox	Time	Qual.
1	Nykjøbings paa Falster (DEN)	Ejler Allert	Christian Hansen	Carl Møller	Carl Pedersen	Poul Hartmann	7:52.0	QS
2	Göteborgs (SWE)	Tage Johnson	Axel Johansson	Axel Gabrielsson	Charles Gabrielsson	Wilhelm Brandes		

Quarterfinal 3: 11.40 a.m. The two crews kept side by side for only 100 metres, the Norwegians then taking the lead and keeping it, without once being challenged by their rivals.

Quarterfinal 3
Place	Boat	Bow	Rower No.2	Rower No.3	Stroke	Cox	Time	Qual.
1	Ormsund (NOR)	Claus Høyer	Reidar Holter	Max Herseth	Frithjof Olstad	Olav Bjørnstad	8:03.0	QS
2	Société Nautique de Bayonne (FRA)	Charles Garnier	Alphonse Meignant	Auguste Richard	Gabriel Poix	François Elichagaray		

=== Semifinals ===
Both semifinals were also held on Wednesday, 17 July.

Semifinal 1: 5.40 p.m. The Norwegians at once took the lead, which they kept for the first of the course, rowing 32–36 to the 34 of the Swedes. Halfway, the Swedish boat crept up to ist rival and, from the bath-house to the post, there was a most desperate struggle for victory, which was decided in favour of the home-crew by an energetic spurt at the last moment.

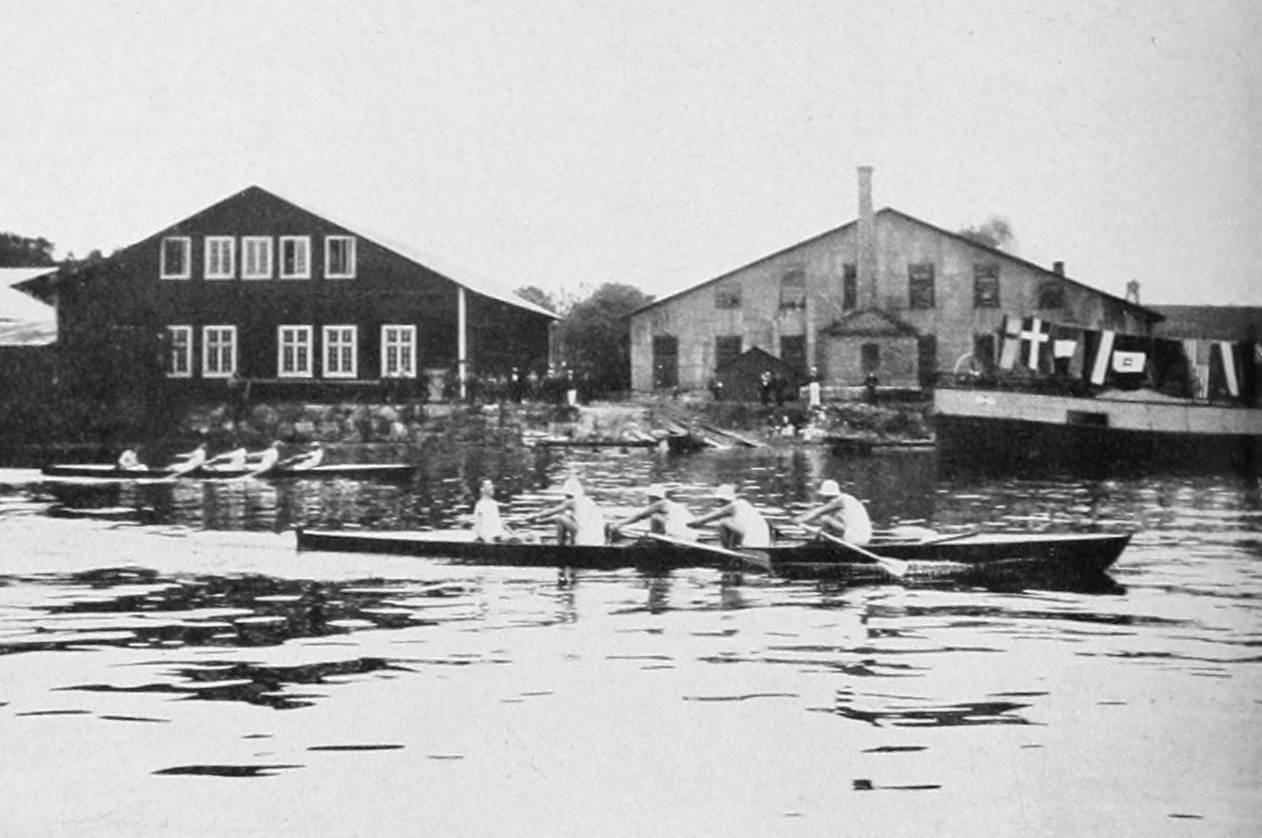
The Swedish Roddklubben af 1912 beating the Norwegian Ormsund (in the background).

Semifinal 1
Place	Boat	Bow	Rower No.2	Rower No.3	Stroke	Cox	Time	Notes	Qual.
1	Roddklubben af 1912 (SWE)	Ture Rosvall	William Bruhn-Möller	Conrad Brunkman	Herman Dahlbäck	Leo Wilkens	7:39.2	OB	QF
Bronze	Ormsund (NOR)	Claus Høyer	Reidar Holter	Max Herseth	Frithjof Olstad	Olav Bjørnstad			

Semifinal 2: 6 p.m. The crew rowed over in beautiful style, but without opponent.

Semifinal 2
Place	Boat	Bow	Rower No.2	Rower No.3	Stroke	Cox	Time	Notes	Qual.
1	Nykjøbings paa Falster (DEN)	Ejler Allert	Christian Hansen	Carl Møller	Carl Pedersen	Poul Hartmann	7:59.5		QF

=== Final ===
The final was held on Thursday, 18 July.

Final: 7.30 p.m. Both crews rowed nicely and evenly, keeping side by side, until the 1,000 metres mark was reached, when the Danish crew, exhibiting perfect style and great physical power, began to take the lead. The Swedish crew was somewhat handicapped by the circumstance that some of the men had taken part in a punishing race against New College in the men's eight competition the same day, and Carl Møller was not at all in form, owing to a bad boil on one of his legs. Consequently, they had little hope of winning when, before the bridge was reached, the Danes began a final spurt, which gave them the race by a clear length. The Danish crew can be taken as the model of perfect rowing in inriggers, and its well-deserved victory was greeted by everyone – not least by its Swedish opponents – with hearty cheers.

Final
Place	Boat	Bow	Rower No.2	Rower No.3	Stroke	Cox	Time
Gold	Nykjøbings paa Falster (DEN)	Ejler Allert	Christian Hansen	Carl Møller	Carl Pedersen	Poul Hartmann	7:44.6
Silver	Roddklubben af 1912 (SWE)	Ture Rosvall	William Bruhn-Möller	Conrad Brunkman	Herman Dahlbäck	Leo Wilkens	7:56.9

== Sources ==
- Bergvall, Erik, ed. (1913). The Official Report of the Olympic Games of Stockholm 1912. Translated by Adams-Ray, Edward. Stockholm: Wahlström & Widstrand.
- Wudarski, Pawel (1999). "Wyniki Igrzysk Olimpijskich" (in Polish).
