= Ejler =

Ejler is a given name. Notable people with the name include:

- Ejler Allert (1881–1959), Danish rower who competed in the 1912 Summer Olympics
- Ejler Andreas Jorgensen (1838–1876), Danish-American landscape and portrait painter
- Ejler Bille (1910–2004), Danish artist
- Ejler Jakobsson (1911–1984), Finnish-born science fiction editor
- Knud Ejler Løgstrup (1905–1981), Danish philosopher and theologian
