= Tage =

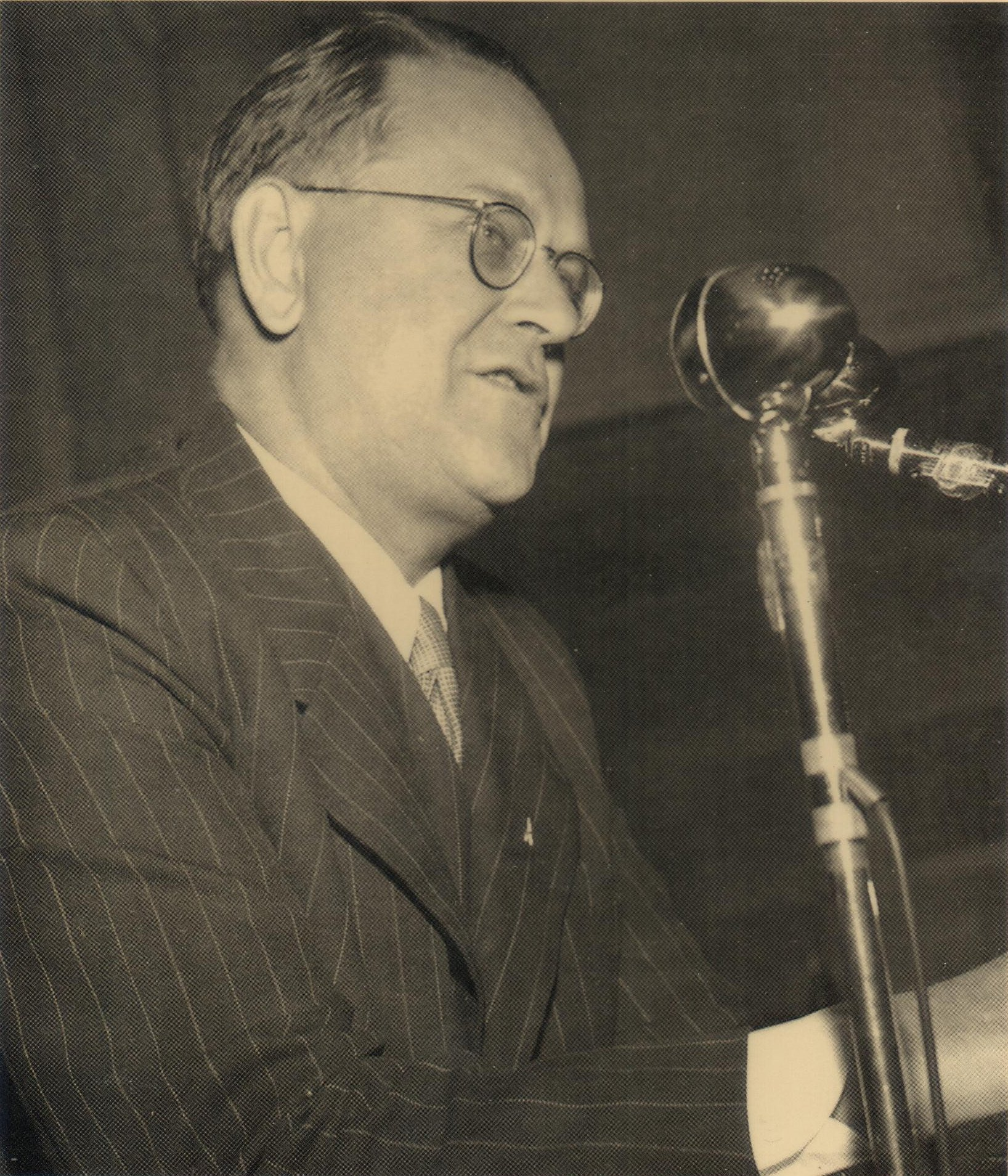
Tage Erlander, 1952

Tage is a masculine given name with Danish origins. People with the name include:

- Tage Åsén (born 1943), Swedish artist
- Tage Aurell (1895–1976), Swedish journalist and novelist
- Tage Brauer (1894–1988), Swedish athlete
- Tage Danielsson (1928–1985), Swedish writer and comedian
- Tage Ekfeldt (1926–2005), Swedish sprinter
- Tage Erlander (1901–1985), 25th Prime Minister of Sweden
- Tage Fahlborg (1912–2005), Swedish canoeist
- Tage Flisberg (1917–1989), Swedish table tennis player
- Tage Frid (1915–2004), Danish-born woodworker and teacher
- Tage Grøndahl (1931–2014), Danish rower
- Tage Grönwall (1903–1988), Swedish diplomat
- Tage Henriksen (1925–2016), Danish rower
- Tage Holmberg (1913–1989), Swedish film editor
- Tage Johnson (1878–1950), Swedish rower
- Tage Jönsson (1920–2001), Swedish racewalker
- Tage Jørgensen (1918–1999), Danish fencer
- Dan Tage Larsson (born 1948), Swedish musician
- Tage Lindbom (1909–2001), Swedish political writer
- Tage Lundin (1933–2019), Swedish biathlete
- Tage Madsen (1919–2004), Danish badminton player
- Tage Minguel (born 2000), Curaçaoan soccer player
- Tage Møller (1914–2006), Danish cyclist
- Tage Nielsen (1929–2003), Danish composer
- Tage Olihn (1908–1996), Swedish Army lieutenant general
- Tage Pettersen (born 1972), Norwegian politician
- Tage Reedtz-Thott (1839–1923), Danish politician
- Tage Schultz (1916–1983), Danish field hockey player
- Tage Skou-Hansen (1925–2015), Danish writer
- Tage Thompson (born 1997), American hockey player
- Tage Juhl Weirum (born 1949), Danish wrestler
- Tage William-Olsson (1888–1960), Swedish architect
- Tage Wissnell (1905–1984), Swedish swimmer and footballer
