= Rogalands Arbeiderblad =

Norwegian newspaper

Rogalands Arbeiderblad was a Norwegian newspaper published in Stavanger in Rogaland county.

== History and profile ==
Rogalands Arbeiderblad was started on 20 November 1926 as the Communist Party organ in the county. It was published weekly. However, the party struggled economically and the newspaper went defunct after its last issue on 3 October 1927. Editor-in-chief was Elias Gabrielsen.
