= George Retzer =

American wrestler

- Born: March 14, 1883; Clarion, Pennsylvania, U.S.
- Died: October 7, 1979 (aged 96); Arcadia, California, U.S.

George Washington Retzer (March 14, 1883 – October 7, 1979) was an American wrestler. He competed in the Greco-Roman wrestling featherweight event at the 1912 Summer Olympics. He finished fourth in Stockholm in the Greco-Roman competition. George was a member of the Los Angeles Athletic Club.

He served as secretary-treasurer of the Southern California Olympians for 17 years.

Retzer died Oct. 7, 1978 in Arcadia, California, at the Huntington Drive Convalescent Home. He was 96 years old at the time, and was considered to be the oldest living Olympian at the time of his death. His brother Richard, on behalf of the Los Angeles Athletic Club, delivered the first Los Angeles bid for the Olympic Games to the IOC in Stockholm in 1912. George Retzer was a Pacific Coast Champion in the Lightweight Division in 1909, and the Southern California Champion in the Lightweight division five times (1908, 1909, 1910, 1911 and 1912). Following the end of his sports career, he became a lumber salesman for Crown City Lumber and Mill Company, and spent his later years living in Arcadia. He remained extremely physically fit throughout his life.

Some of his trophies (four sterling silver cups) were auctioned off by the LA84 Foundation in 2016 for $266.40.
