= Kaarlo Koskelo =

Finnish wrestler (1888–1953)

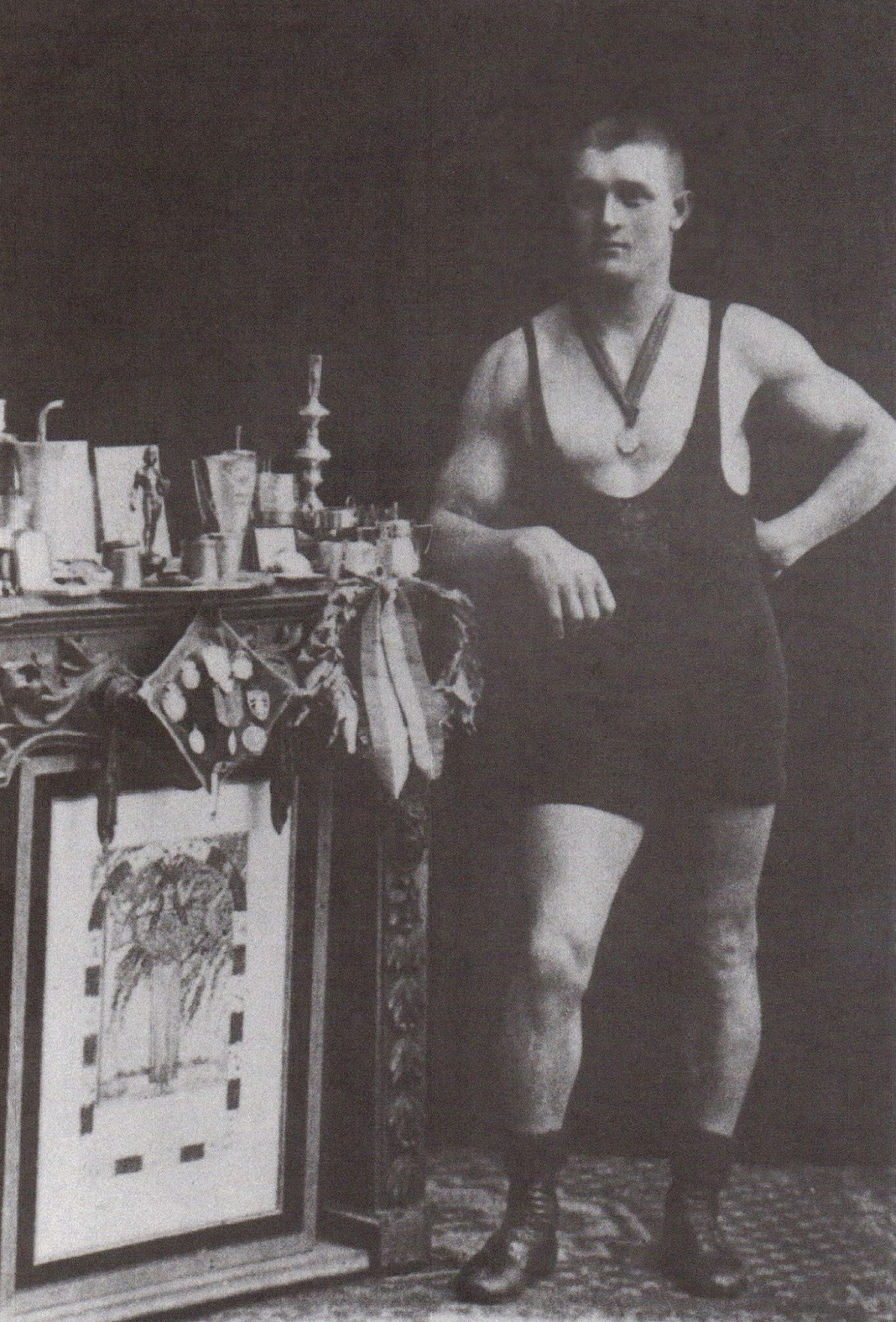

Personal information
- Born: 12 April 1888 Kotka, Finland
- Died: 21 December 1953 (aged 65) Astoria, Oregon, U.S.
- Height: 1.72 m (5 ft 8 in)
- Weight: 60–68 kg (132–150 lb)

Sport
- Sport: Greco-Roman wrestling
- Club: Kotkan Riento, Kotka
Medal record
Men's Greco-Roman wrestling
Representing Finland
Olympic Games
Gold medal – first place	1912 Stockholm	Featherweight

Kaarlo Anton "Kalle" Koskelo (12 April 1888 – 21 December 1953) was a Greco-Roman wrestler from Finland who won the featherweight event at the 1912 Olympics. He then fought in World War I and Finnish Civil War, and in 1919 immigrated to the United States. He settled in Astoria, Oregon, where he became a prominent local businessman.

== Family ==
Kaarlo Koskelo married Lydia Koskelo (née Husa, 1889–1973) in 1909. Their son Elmer Koskelo (1912–1997) was a star javelin thrower at the University of Oregon.
