= József Pongrácz =

Hungarian wrestler

- Born: 3 June 1891; Szeged, Hungary
- Died: 14 March 1959 (aged 67)

József Pongrácz (3 June 1891 – 14 March 1959) was a Hungarian wrestler. He competed in the featherweight event at the 1912 Summer Olympics.
