= Aleksandrs Miezītis =

Latvian wrestler

- Born: June 1890; Riga, Russian Empire
- Died: c. 1946

Aleksandrs Miezītis (June 1890 – c. 1946) was a Latvian wrestler. He competed in the featherweight event at the 1912 Summer Olympics.
