= Wilhelm Brandes =

Swedish rowing cox

Friedrich Wilhelm Brandes (29 June 1877 – 5 October 1959) was a German-born Swedish rowing coxswain who competed in the 1912 Summer Olympics.

He coxed the Swedish boat Göteborgs that was eliminated in the quarter-finals of the men's coxed fours, inriggers tournament.
