= Wrestling at the 1912 Summer Olympics – Men's Greco-Roman featherweight =

Men's featherweight Greco-Roman wrestling at the Games of the V Olympiad
- Venue: Stockholm Olympic Stadium
- Dates: July 6–15
- Competitors: 38 from 13 nations

Medalists
1st place, gold medalist(s)		Kaarlo Koskelo	Finland
2nd place, silver medalist(s)		Georg Gerstäcker	Germany
3rd place, bronze medalist(s)		Otto Lasanen	Finland

The Greco-Roman featherweight competition at the 1912 Summer Olympics was part of the wrestling programme.

The competition used a form of double-elimination tournament. Rather than using the brackets that are now standard for double-elimination contests (and which assure that each match is between two competitors with the same number of losses), each wrestler drew a number. Each man would face off against the wrestler with the next number, provided he had not already faced that wrestler and that the wrestler was not from the same nation as him (unless this was necessary to avoid byes).

When only three wrestlers remain (the medalists), the double-elimination halts and a special final round is used to determine the order of the medals.

Featherweight was the lightest category, including wrestlers weighing up to 60 kilograms (130 lb).

== Results ==
=== First round ===
Losses	Winner	Loser	Losses
0	Hjalmar Lehmusvirta (FIN)	Percy Cockings (GBR)	1
0	Kaarle Leivonen (FIN)	Mariano Ciai (ITA)	1
0	Mikael Hestdahl (NOR)	Bruno Åkesson (SWE)	1
0	Erik Öberg (SWE)	Alfred Taylor (GBR)	1
0	Christian Arnesen (NOR)	Josef Beránek (BOH)	1
0	Pavel Pavlovich (RUS)	Karl Karlsson (SWE)	1
0	Otto Lasanen (FIN)	Arvid Beckman (SWE)	1
0	Ragnvald Gullaksen (NOR)	Ewald Persson (SWE)	1
0	Karl Kangas (FIN)	Aleksandr Akondinov (RUS)	1
0	Harry Larsson (SWE)	Konrad Stein (GER)	1
0	József Pongrácz (HUN)	William Lyshon (USA)	1
0	Hugo Johansson (SWE)	Georg Andersen (GER)	1
0	Georg Gerstäcker (GER)	András Szoszky (HUN)	1
0	Verner Hetmar (DEN)	Risto Mustonen (FIN)	1
0	Lauri Haapanen (FIN)	António Pereira (POR)	1
0	George MacKenzie (GBR)	Aleksandrs Miezīts (RUS)	1
0	Carl-Georg Andersson (SWE)	Carl Hansen (DEN)	1
0	Kaarlo Koskelo (FIN)	Heinrich Rauß (AUT)	1
0	Friedrich Scharrer (AUT)	George Retzer (USA)	1

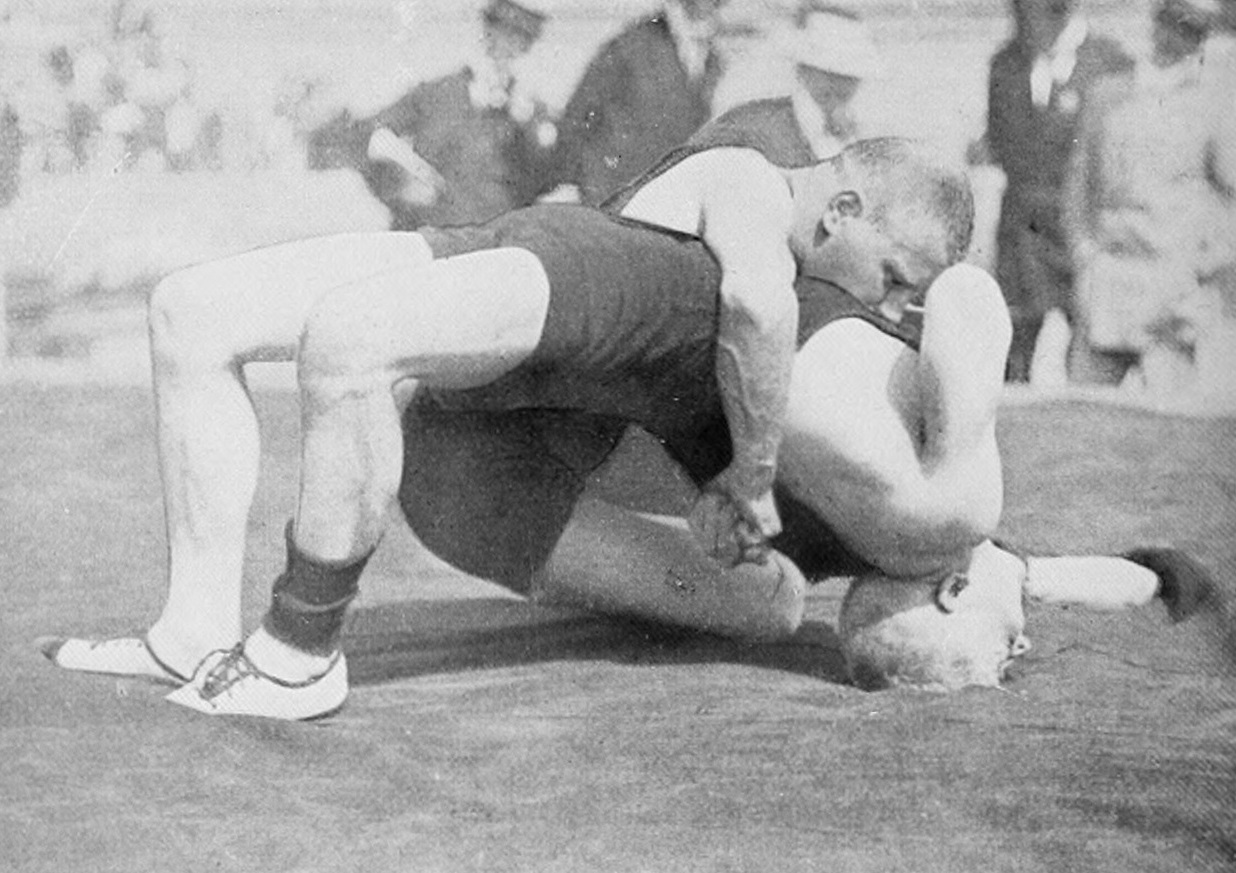
Ewald Persson bridging from Ragnvald Gullaksen's powerful attack.

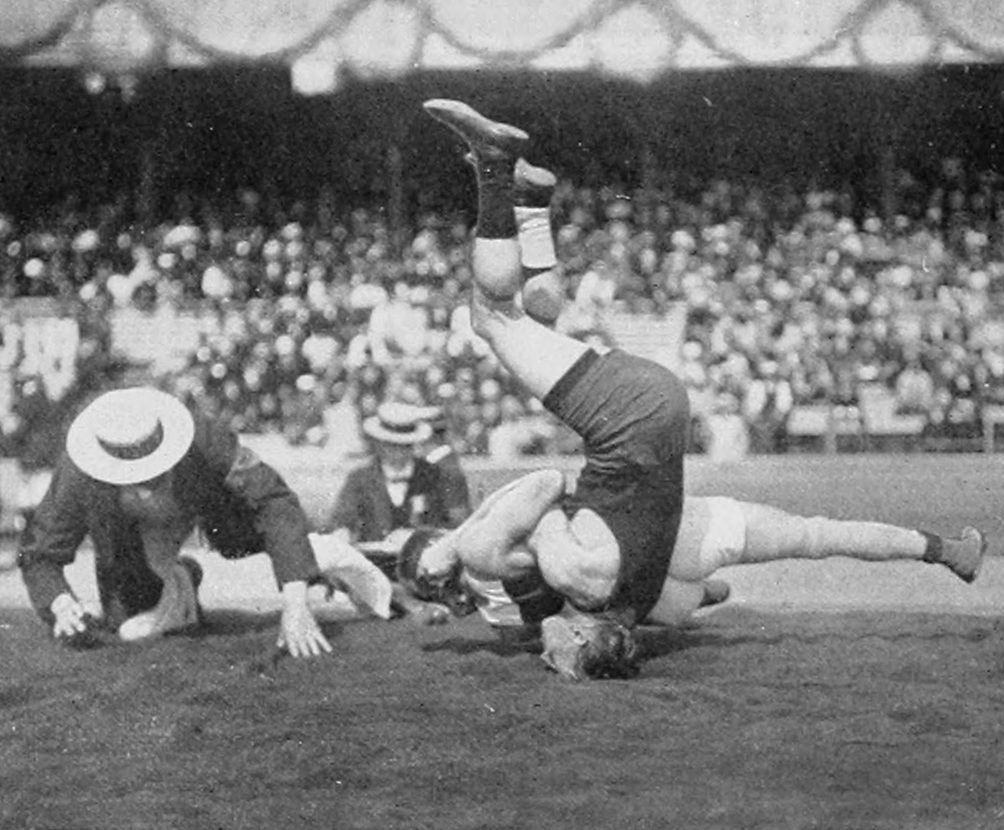
A double-nelson by Harry Larsson parried by Konrad Stein.

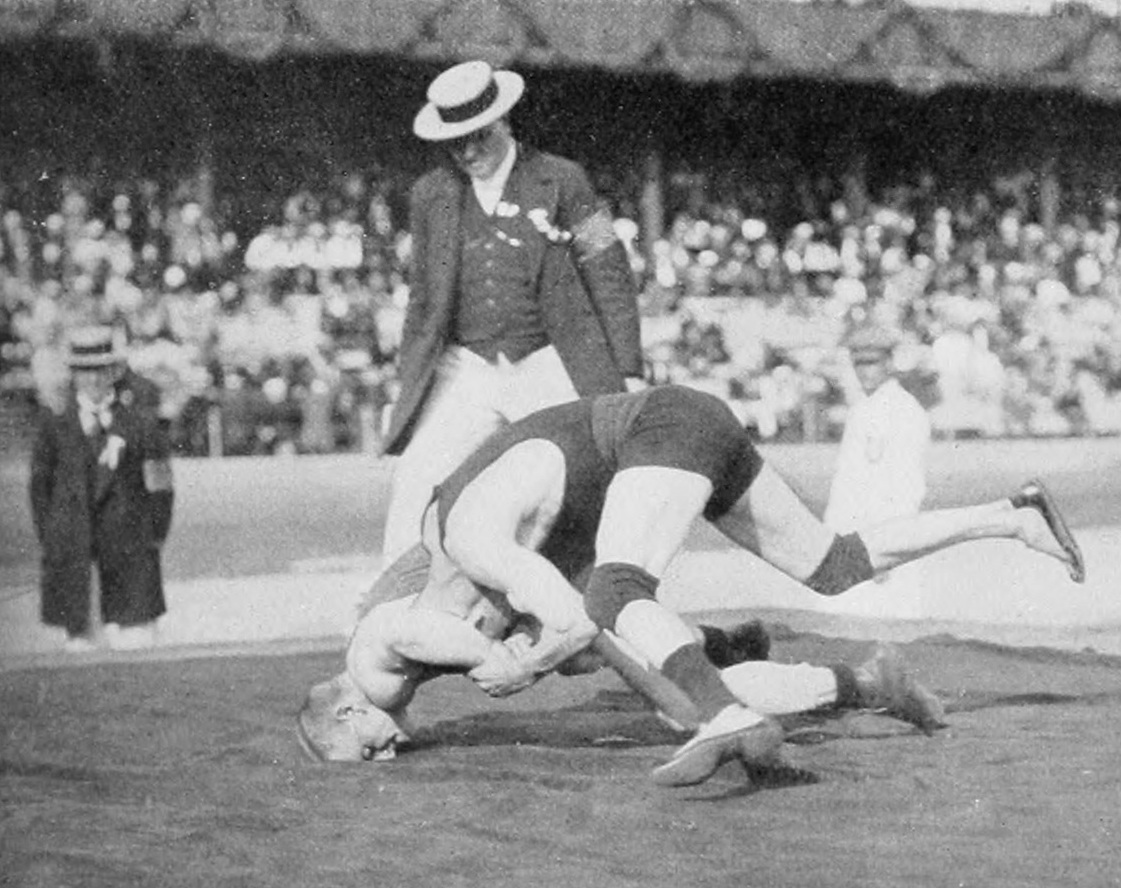
A chancery-hold by Carl Hansen parried by Carl-Georg Andersson.

=== Second round ===
38 wrestlers began this round. In the 19 matches, 13 wrestlers suffered their second loss in this round and were eliminated. 6 wrestlers suffered their first loss. 13 wrestlers continued undefeated, while 6 won whilst avoiding elimination.

Losses	Winner	Loser	Losses
0	Hjalmar Lehmusvirta (FIN)	Mariano Ciai (ITA)	2
0	Kaarlo Leivonen (FIN)	Percy Cockings (GBR)	2
1	Bruno Åkesson (SWE)	Alfred Taylor (GBR)	2
0	Erik Öberg (SWE)	Mikael Hestdahl (NOR)	1
1	Josef Beránek (BOH)	Karl Karlsson (SWE)	2
0	Paweł Pawłowicz (RUS)	Kristian Arneson (NOR)	1
1	Arvid Beckman (SWE)	Ragnvald Gullaksen (NOR)	1
0	Otto Lasanen (FIN)	Ewald Persson (SWE)	2
0	Harry Larsson (SWE)	Karl Kangas (FIN)	1
1	Aleksandr Ankondinow (RUS)	Konrad Stein (GER)	2
0	József Pongrácz (HUN)	Georg Andersen (GER)	2
0	Hugo Johansson (SWE)	William Lysohn (USA)	2
0	Georg Gerstäcker (GER)	Risto Mustonen (FIN)	2
0	Lauri Haapanen (FIN)	András Szoszky (HUN)	2
0	Verner Hetmar (DEN)	Aleksanders Meesits (RUS)	2
1	António Pereira (POR)	George MacKenzie (GBR)	1
0	Kaarlo Koskelo (FIN)	Carl Hansen (DEN)	2
0	Friedrich Schärer (AUT)	Carl-Georg Andersson (SWE)	1
1	Hans Rauss (AUT)	George Retzer (USA)	2

=== Third round ===
13 wrestlers began this round with no losses, 12 with one loss.

5 wrestlers suffered their second loss in this round and were eliminated. Bruno Åkesson and George MacKenzie (both of whom had one loss entering the round) withdrew and did not compete in this round, bringing the total eliminations to 7. 7 wrestlers continued undefeated, 5 won whilst avoiding elimination, and 6 suffered their first loss.

Losses	Winner	Loser	Losses
0	Hjalmar Lehmusvirta (FIN)	Mikael Hestdahl (NOR)	2
0	Kaarlo Leivonen (FIN)	Erik Öberg (SWE)	1
1	Josef Beránek (BOH)	Paweł Pawłowicz (RUS)	1
1	Arvid Beckman (SWE)	Kristian Arneson (NOR)	2
0	Otto Lasanen (FIN)	Ragnvald Gullaksen (NOR)	2
1	Karl Kangas (FIN)	József Pongrácz (HUN)	1
0	Harry Larsson (SWE)	Aleksandr Ankondinow (RUS)	2
0	Georg Gerstäcker (GER)	Hugo Johansson (SWE)	1
0	Lauri Haapanen (FIN)	Verner Hetmar (DEN)	1
1	Carl-Georg Andersson (SWE)	António Pereira (POR)	2
0	Kaarlo Koskelo (FIN)	Friedrich Schärer (AUT)	1
1	Hans Rauss (AUT)	Bye	—

=== Fourth round ===
7 wrestlers began this round with no losses, 11 with one loss.

Of the 9 matches, 2 pitted undefeated wrestlers against each other. 4 involved two wrestlers who each had one loss. The remaining three were contested by an undefeated wrestler against one facing elimination; in all three the man with one loss received his second.

This resulted in 5 wrestlers keeping their undefeated status and 7 being eliminated. 2 men received their first loss and 4 won while avoiding elimination.

Losses	Winner	Loser	Losses
0	Hjalmar Lehmusvirta (FIN)	Hans Rauss (AUT)	2
0	Kaarlo Leivonen (FIN)	Josef Beránek (BOH)	2
1	Erik Öberg (SWE)	Paweł Pawłowicz (RUS)	2
1	Karl Kangas (FIN)	Arvid Beckman (SWE)	2
0	Otto Lasanen (FIN)	Harry Larsson (SWE)	1
1	Hugo Johansson (SWE)	József Pongrácz (HUN)	2
0	Georg Gerstäcker (GER)	Lauri Haapanen (FIN)	1
1	Verner Hetmar (DEN)	Friedrich Schärer (AUT)	2
0	Kaarlo Koskelo (FIN)	Carl-Georg Andersson (SWE)	2

=== Fifth round ===
5 wrestlers began this round with no losses, 6 with one loss.

All five matches pitted one of the undefeated men against a man facing elimination. In contrast to the previous round, in which the undefeated man won all such matches, 2 of these contests resulted in a man avoiding elimination by handing his opponent a first loss. 2 more resulted in eliminations. The fifth match, between Johansson and Lasanen, resulted in a loss for both due to disqualifications; Johansson was eliminated while Lasanen got his first loss. This left only Koskelo and Leivonen undefeated, with 3 men having their first loss in this round and 3 (including Haapanen, who had a bye) continuing to remain at one loss.

Losses	Winner	Loser	Losses
1	Erik Öberg (SWE)	Hjalmar Lehmusvirta (FIN)	1
0	Kaarlo Leivonen (FIN)	Harry Larsson (SWE)	2
2	Hugo Johansson (SWE)	Otto Lasanen (FIN)	1
1	Karl Kangas (FIN)	Georg Gerstacker (GER)	1
0	Kaarlo Koskelo (FIN)	Verner Hetmar (DEN)	2
1	Lauri Haapanen (FIN)	Bye	—

=== Sixth round ===
2 wrestlers began this round with no losses, 6 with one loss.

Two of the matches were certain-elimination matches, with both men having one loss. The other two placed the undefeated men, Leivonen and Koskelo, each against a man with one loss; Leivonen took his first loss to Lasanen whilst Koskelo eliminated Kangas to remain as the only undefeated wrestler in the competition.

Losses	Winner	Loser	Losses
1	Erik Öberg (SWE)	Lauri Haapanen (FIN)	2
1	Georg Gerstacker (GER)	Hjalmar Lehmusvirta (FIN)	2
1	Otto Lasanen (FIN)	Kaarlo Leivonen (FIN)	1
0	Kaarlo Koskelo (FIN)	Karl Kangas (FIN)	2

=== Seventh round ===
1 wrestlers began this round with no losses, 4 with one loss.

Leivonen lost his second straight match, completing a sudden drop from one of two undefeated wrestlers to one of 35 who did not make it to the final round, with Gerstacker advancing on the strength of that win. Lasanen defeated Öberg to join Gerstacker and Koskelo, who had a bye in the seventh round, in the finals.

Losses	Winner	Loser	Losses
1	Georg Gerstacker (GER)	Kaarlo Leivonen (FIN)	2
1	Otto Lasanen (FIN)	Erik Öberg (SWE)	2
0	Kaarlo Koskelo (FIN)	Bye	—

=== Final round ===
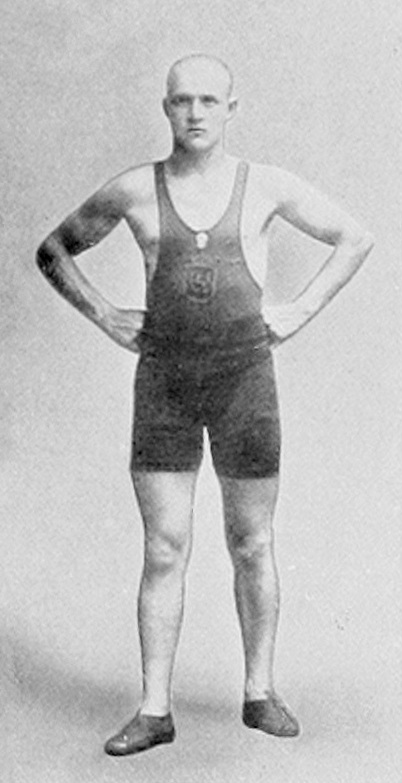
The Finnish gold medalist Kaarlo Koskelo.

With three wrestlers remaining, all of the previous results were ignored for the final round. Gerstacker and Lasanen drew a first-round match. The loser would face Koskelo; the loser of this second match would get the bronze medal while the winner would wrestle the winner of the first match for gold and silver.

Gerstacker's win in the first match guaranteed him a gold or silver medal, while Lasanen's loss dropped him out of contention for the gold. Lasanen failed to appear for the second bout, giving Koskelo the win and setting up a Koskelo/Gerstacker match for gold while Lasanen received bronze.

Koskelo, who had made his way through the first seven rounds unscathed, won again in the final bout against Gerstacker.

Match		Winner	Loser	
A	To C	Georg Gerstacker (GER)	Otto Lasanen (FIN)	To B
B	To C	Kaarlo Koskelo (FIN)	Otto Lasanen (FIN)	Bronze
C	Gold	Kaarlo Koskelo (FIN)	Georg Gerstacker (GER)	Silver
