= Risto Mustonen =

Finnish wrestler (1875–1941)

- Born: 24 April 1875; Lieksa, Finland
- Died: 3 March 1941 (aged 65); Helsinki, Finland

Risto Mustonen (24 April 1875 – 3 March 1941) was a Finnish wrestler. He was born in Lieksa. He competed in the featherweight event at the 1912 Summer Olympics. He won a bronze medal at the 1921 World Wrestling Championships.
