= Gabrielson =

Gabrielson is a surname. Notable people with the surname include:

- Frank Gabrielson (1910–1980), American stage, film, and television writer
- Guy Gabrielson (1891–1976), Republican politician from New Jersey
- Len Gabrielson (first baseman) (1915–2000), first baseman in Major League Baseball
- Len Gabrielson (outfielder) (born 1940), outfielder in Major League Baseball
- Ryan Gabrielson, investigative journalist

== See also ==
- Gabrielsson
