= Axel Johansson (rower) =

Swedish rower (1885–1973)

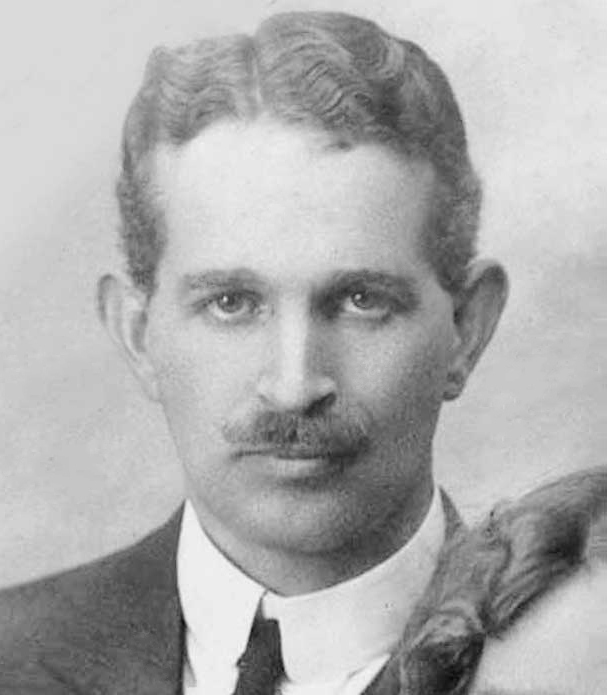

Personal information
- Born: 16 October 1885 Gothenburg, Sweden
- Died: 2 February 1979 (aged 88) Göteborg, Sweden

Sport
- Sport: Rowing
- Club: Göteborgs RF

Karl Axel Johansson (16 October 1885 – 2 February 1979) was a Swedish rower who competed in the 1912 Summer Olympics. He was a member of the Swedish boat Göteborgs RF that was eliminated in the quarter-finals of the coxed fours, inriggers tournament.
