= Aleksandr Akondinov =

Russian wrestler

- Born: 30 August 1891; St. Petersburg, Russian Empire

Aleksandr Akondinov (born 30 August 1891 – date of death unknown) was a Russian wrestler. He competed in the featherweight event at the 1912 Summer Olympics.
