= Kaarle Leivonen =

Finnish wrestler

- Full name: Kaarle Herman Leivonen
- Born: 17 September 1886; Jalasjärvi, Finland
- Died: 23 September 1938 (aged 52); Petrozavodsk, Soviet Union

Kaarle Herman "Kalle" Leivonen (17 September 1886 – 23 September 1938) was a Finnish wrestler who competed in the featherweight event at the 1912 Summer Olympics.

== Later life ==
Leivonen moved from Pietarsaari, Grand Duchy of Finland, to the United States in 1914. The Great Depression triggered a migration among Finnish Americans to the Soviet Union in the early 1930s, and in 1932, Leivonen followed thousands of other Finnish-American workers. He moved to Kondopoga in Soviet Karelia, where he worked as a painter. In 1938, during the Great Purge, Leivonen was arrested. He was sentenced to death on 21 September 1938, and two days later he was executed near Petrozavodsk. Leivonen was rehabilitated in 1989.
