= Karl Karlsson =

Swedish wrestler

- Born: 16 November 1887
- Died: 8 April 1964 (aged 76)

Karl Karlsson (16 November 1887 – 8 April 1964) was a Swedish wrestler. He competed in the featherweight event at the 1912 Summer Olympics.
