= András Szoszky =

Hungarian wrestler

- Born: 9 January 1887; Békéscsaba, Hungary
- Died: 24 October 1945 (aged 58); Chicago, Illinois, United States
- Olympic team: Hungary (HUN)

András Szoszky (9 January 1887 – 24 October 1945) was a Hungarian wrestler. He competed in the featherweight event at the 1912 Summer Olympics.

== Wrestling career ==
Szoszky started his competitive career in 1910. After two years, in 1912, Szosky took part in the Stockholm Summer Olympics in the featherweight event, part of the Olympics Wrestling Program, but was eliminated after two rounds receiving no awards. Success followed a year later, in 1913, when he won the gold medal at the unofficial European Championships. Nearly a decade later, he won the Hungarian title in 1921 before immigrating to the United States.
