= Alfred Taylor (wrestler) =

British wrestler

- Born: 8 February 1889; London, England
- Died: 18 March 1966 (aged 77)

Alfred Taylor (8 February 1889 – 18 March 1966) was a British wrestler. He competed in the featherweight event at the 1912 Summer Olympics.
