= Carl-Georg Andersson =

Swedish wrestler

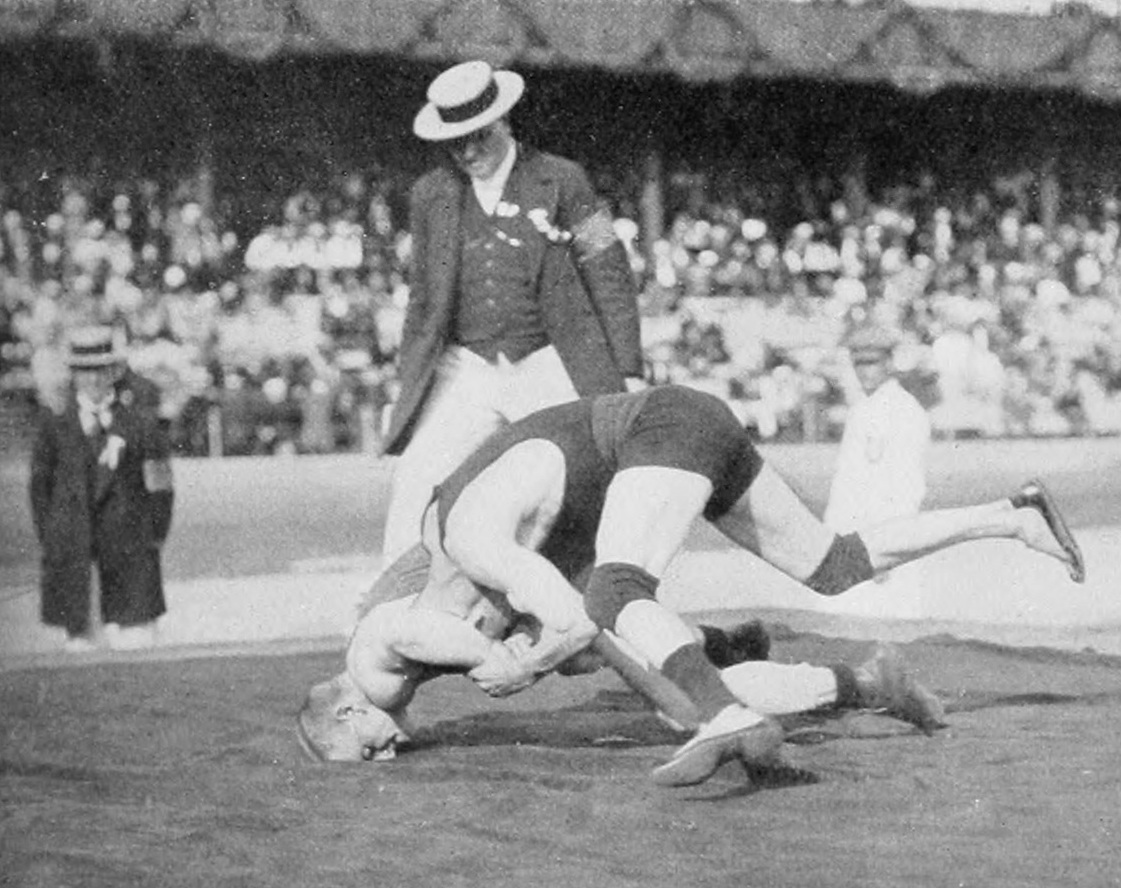
- Andersson wrestling Carl Hansen at the 1912 Summer Olympics
- Born: 19 May 1885; Halmstad, Sweden
- Died: 21 March 1961 (aged 75); Copenhagen, Denmark

Carl-Georg Andersson (19 May 1885 – 21 March 1961) was a Swedish wrestler. He competed in the featherweight event at the 1912 Summer Olympics.
