= Alphonse Meignant =

French rower

Personal information
- Full name: Alphonse Adrien Meignant
- Nationality: French
- Born: 27 March 1882; Paris, France
- Died: 4 November 1914 (aged 32); Saint-Eloi, Belgium

Sport
- Sport: Rowing

Alphonse Adrien Meignant (27 March 1882 – 4 November 1914) was a French rower. He competed in the men's coxed four, inriggers event at the 1912 Summer Olympics. He was killed in action during World War I.

== See also ==
- List of Olympians killed in World War I
