= William Lyshon =

American wrestler

- Born: December 30, 1887; Philadelphia, Pennsylvania, U.S.
- Died: October 23, 1918 (aged 30); France
- Cause of death: Killed in action

William Jones Lyshon (December 30, 1887 – October 23, 1918) was an American wrestler. He competed in the Greco-Roman wrestling featherweight event at the 1912 Summer Olympics. He was killed in action during World War I.

== See also ==
- List of Olympians killed in World War I
