= Auguste Richard =

French rower

Personal information
- Full name: Auguste Henri Richard
- Nationality: French
- Born: 14 February 1883; Paris, France
- Died: 31 August 1914 (aged 31); Fosse, Ardennes, France

Sport
- Sport: Rowing

Auguste Henri Richard (14 February 1883 – 31 August 1914) was a French rower. He competed in the men's coxed four, inriggers event at the 1912 Summer Olympics.

== Personal life ==
Richard served as a soldat de 2e classe (soldier second class) in the 31st Infantry Regiment of the French Army during the First World War. He was killed in action in Ardennes on 31 August 1914.
