= Christian Arnesen =

Norwegian wrestler

- Born: 26 July 1890; Oslo, Sweden-Norway
- Died: 18 November 1956 (aged 66); Oslo, Norway

Christian Aleksander Arnesen (26 July 1890 – 18 November 1956) was a Norwegian wrestler. He competed in the featherweight event at the 1912 Summer Olympics.
