= Alfred Stabell =

Norwegian sport shooter (1862–1942)

Personal information
- Born: 30 January 1862 Oslo, Norway
- Died: 25 March 1942 (aged 80) Oslo, Norway

Sport
- Sport: Sports shooting

Alfred Stabell (30 January 1862 – 25 March 1942) was a Norwegian sport shooter. He was born in Oslo, and his club was Christiania Skytterlag. He competed in trap shooting at the 1912 Summer Olympics in Stockholm.
