= Birger Andreassen =

Norwegian cyclist

Personal information
- Born: 31 December 1891 Oslo, Norway
- Died: 25 March 1961 (aged 69) Oslo, Norway

Cycling career
- Sport: Cycling

Birger Andreassen (31 December 1891 – 25 March 1961) was a Norwegian cyclist. He competed in two events at the 1912 Summer Olympics.
