= Tage Johnson =

Swedish rower

Anders Olof Tage Johnson (25 March 1878 – 30 September 1950) was a Swedish rower who competed in the 1912 Summer Olympics.

He was the bowman of the Swedish boat Göteborgs which was eliminated in the quarter-finals of the men's coxed fours, inriggers tournament.
