= K. J. Gabrielsson =

Swedish writer and poet (1861–1901)

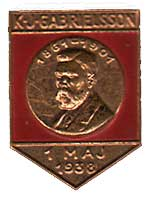
A medal depicting Karl Johan Gabrielsson.

Karl Johan (K. J.) Gabrielsson (1861–1901) was a Swedish socialist writer and poet. The son of a railway worker, he was born to a poor family in Töreboda, Västra Götaland County, Gabrielsson eventually settled in Stockholm where he became a socialist and writer, mainly of revolutionary poems, for the newspaper Social-Demokraten. He died from tuberculosis in 1901 following a long illness.

Gabrielsson was the most famous poet of the socialist wave of writers. He differed, however, from other writers in that his works called for reform rather than out and out revolutions. His poems were piercingly accurate. The reason for this was that when he wrote, he was doing so from personal experience. His childhood was passed in dire poverty. Even as a child he had to work as a construction laborer. His literary career began in 1892 when he found a job as a reporter in The Social Democrat. He later became the editor of the weekly People's Will. His most famous poem was And I would forget I?, which appeared in the October 21, 1892 issue of The Social Democrat.

Gabrielsson is the subject a biography written by the radical journalist Ture Nerman.
