= Harry Svendsen =

Norwegian swimmer

Personal information
- Nationality: Norwegian
- Born: 28 January 1895; Strömstad, Sweden
- Died: 20 January 1960 (aged 64)

Sport
- Sport: Swimming
- Club: Oslo Kappsvømmingsklubb

Harry Svendsen (2 January 1895 – 20 January 1960) was a Norwegian swimmer. He was born in Strömstad, Sweden, and his club was Oslo Kappsvømmingsklubb. He competed in backstroke at the 1912 Summer Olympics in Stockholm.
