= Odd Stokke Gabrielsen =

Norwegian biochemist

Odd Stokke Gabrielsen (born 1951) is a Norwegian biochemist.

He studied at the University of Oslo, taking the cand.mag. degree in 1973 and cand.real. in 1977. He was a research fellow from 1977 to 1983 under Tordis Øyen, became an associate professor in January 1992 and professor in May 1993. He is a fellow of the Norwegian Academy of Science and Letters.

He resides in Oslo.
