= Ture Rosvall =

Swedish rower

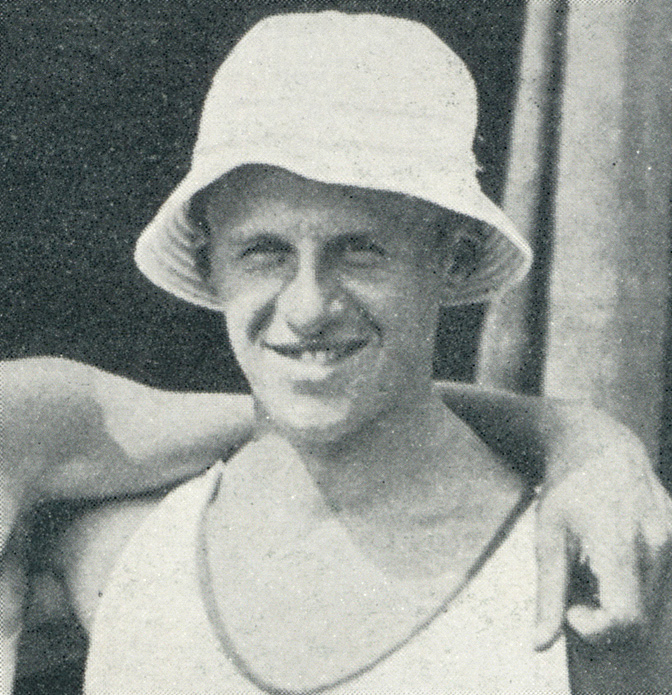

Personal information
- Born: 6 July 1891 Malmö, Sweden
- Died: 10 October 1977 (aged 86) Djursholm, Danderyd, Sweden

Sport
- Sport: Rowing
- Club: Stockholms RK
Medal record
Representing Sweden
Olympic Games
Silver medal – second place	1912 Stockholm	Coxed four, inriggers

Ture Albin Rosvall (6 July 1891 – 10 October 1977) was a Swedish rower who competed in the 1912 Summer Olympics. He won a silver medal in the coxed four, inriggers, and failed to reach the finals of the eight tournament.
