= Charles Oluf Herlofson =

Norwegian naval officer (1916–1984)

Charles Oluf Herlofson DSC
- Born: 28 March 1916; Kristiania, Norway
- Died: 4 December 1984 (aged 68)
- Allegiance: Norway
- Branch: Navy
- Notable war: World War II
- Awards: War Cross with two Swords; St. Olav's Medal with Oak Branch; British Distinguished Service Cross; Atlantic Star
- Spouse(s): Lydia Grace Edney

Charles Oluf Herlofson, DSC (28 March 1916 – 4 December 1984) was a Norwegian naval officer. He was highly decorated for his achievements during World War II.

== Personal life ==
Herlofson was born in Kristiania to Charles Herlofson and Ellinor Boe. He graduated as naval officer in 1939. In 1945 he married Lydia Grace Edney.

== Career ==
During World War II he joined the Norwegian forces in the United Kingdom. He served with the Norwegian Motor Torpedo Boat flotilla at Shetland, and took part in several raids to the coast of occupied Norway. Among his war decorations were the War Cross with two Swords, the St. Olav's Medal with Oak Branch, the British Distinguished Service Cross and the Atlantic Star, and he was twice Mentioned in dispatches.

After the war he assumed various positions in the Royal Norwegian Navy. Between 1955 and 1958 he also contributed to the development of the Ethiopian Navy. He was Officer of the American Legion of Merit, and Officer of the Ethiopian Order of Menelik II.
