= Gustav Hæhre =

Norwegian rower

Personal information
- Nationality: Norwegian
- Born: 5 September 1878
- Died: 22 September 1950 (aged 72)

Sport
- Sport: Rowing
- Club: Christiania RK

Gustav Hæhre (5 September 1878 – 22 September 1950) was a Norwegian rower who competed for Christiania Roklub. He competed in the eight and in the coxed four, inriggers at the 1912 Summer Olympics in Stockholm.
