= Hannibal Fegth =

Norwegian rower

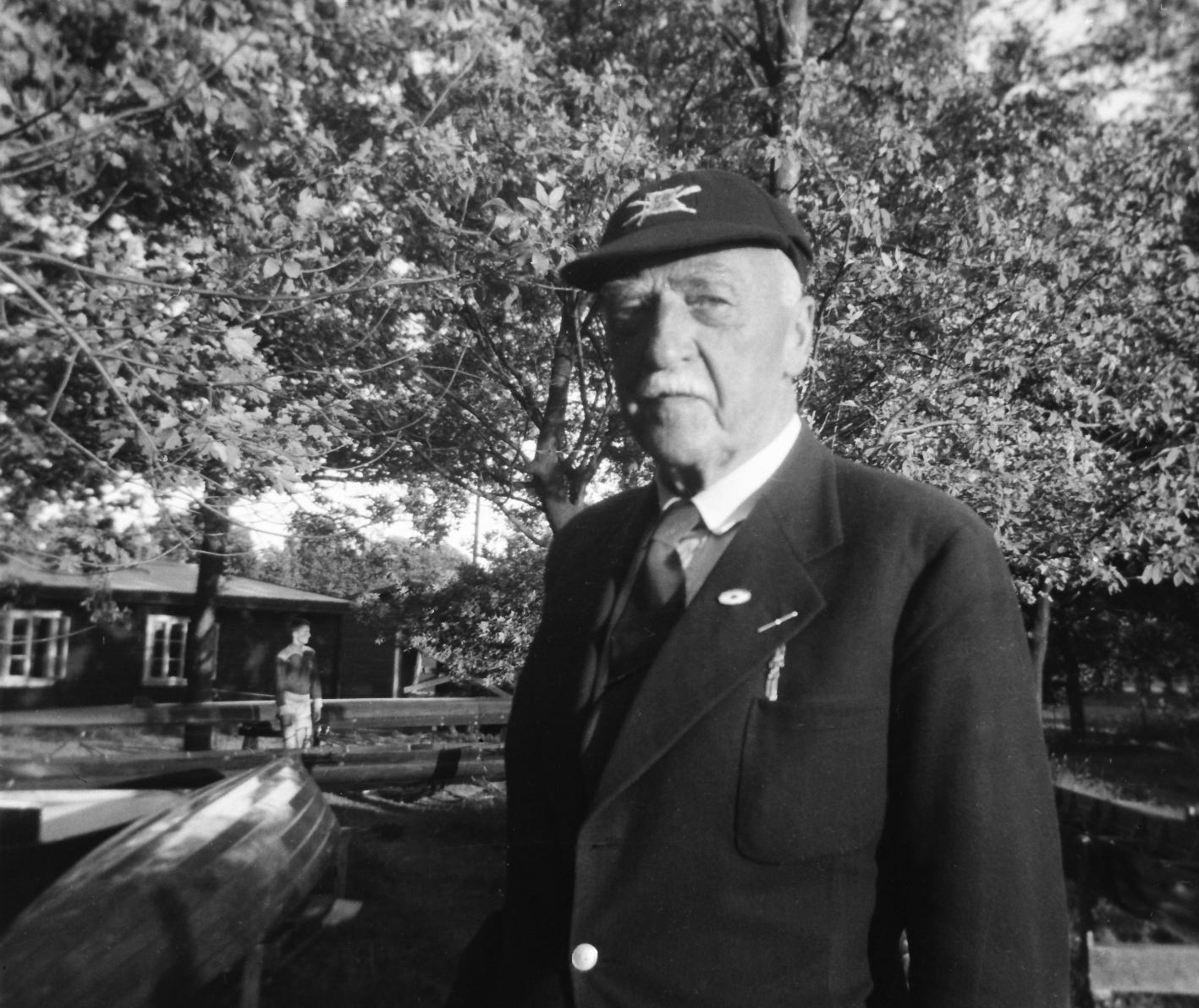
- Fegth in 1956

Personal information
- Full name: Ole Hannibal Sommerfeldt Fegth
- Nationality: Norwegian
- Born: 27 August 1879; Christiania
- Died: 15 September 1967 (aged 88)

Sport
- Sport: Rowing
- Club: Christiania Roklub

Ole Hannibal Sommerfeldt Fegth (27 August 1879 – 15 September 1967) was a Norwegian rower who competed for Christiania Roklub. He competed in the eight and in the coxed four, inriggers at the 1912 Summer Olympics in Stockholm.
