= Christian Hansen (rower) =

Danish rower (1890–1953)

Olympic medal record

Men's rowing

Representing Denmark
Gold medal – first place	1912 Stockholm	Coxed four, inriggers

Jørgen Christian Hansen (14 August 1890 in Sakskøbing, Denmark – 10 September 1953 in Gentofte, Denmark) was a Danish rower who competed in the 1912 Summer Olympics.

He was a crew member of the Danish boat, which won the gold medal in the coxed four, inriggers.

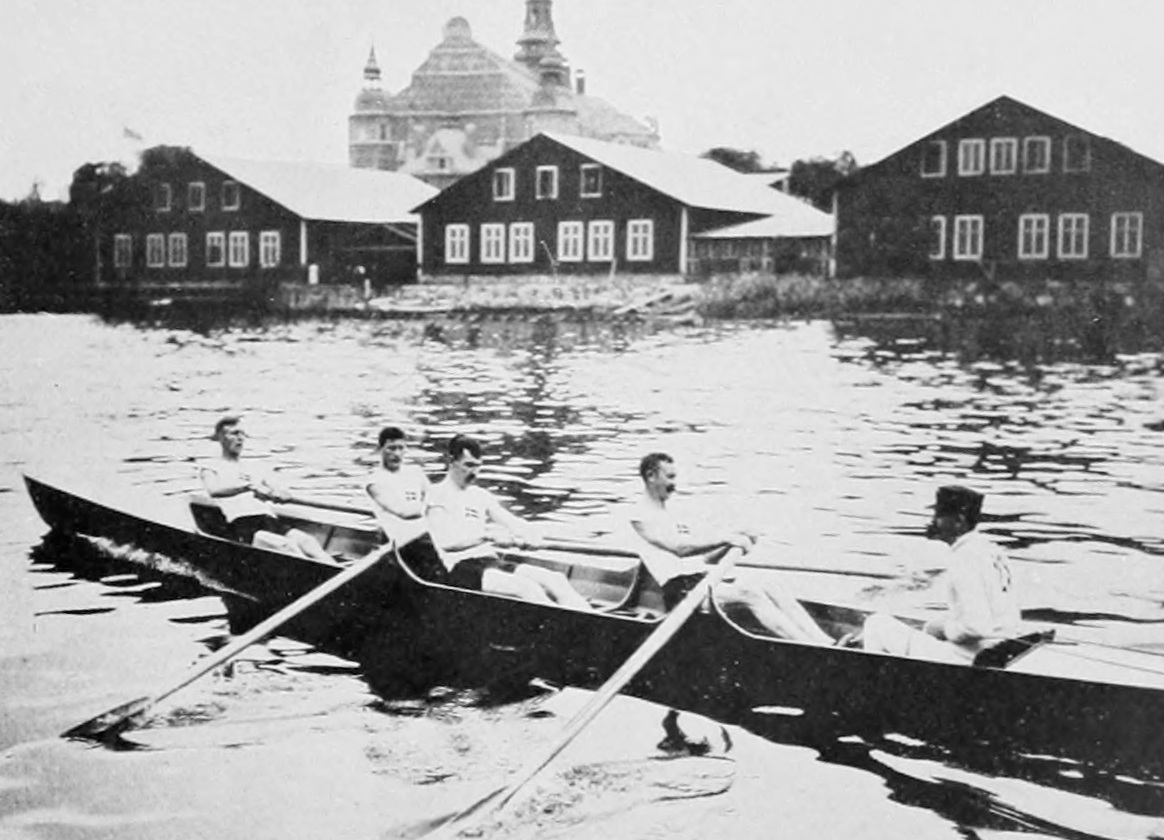
The Danish 4 at the 1912 Olympics
