= Bruno Åkesson =

Swedish wrestler

- Born: 22 January 1887; Malmö, Sweden-Norway
- Died: 3 February 1971 (aged 84); Malmö, Sweden

Jöns Bruno Vincent (22 January 1887 – 3 February 1971) was a Swedish wrestler. He competed in the featherweight event at the 1912 Summer Olympics.

Åkesson represented Djurgårdens IF.
