= Carl Møller =

Danish rower (1887–1948)

Olympic medal record

Men's rowing

Representing Denmark
Gold medal – first place	1912 Stockholm	Coxed four, inriggers

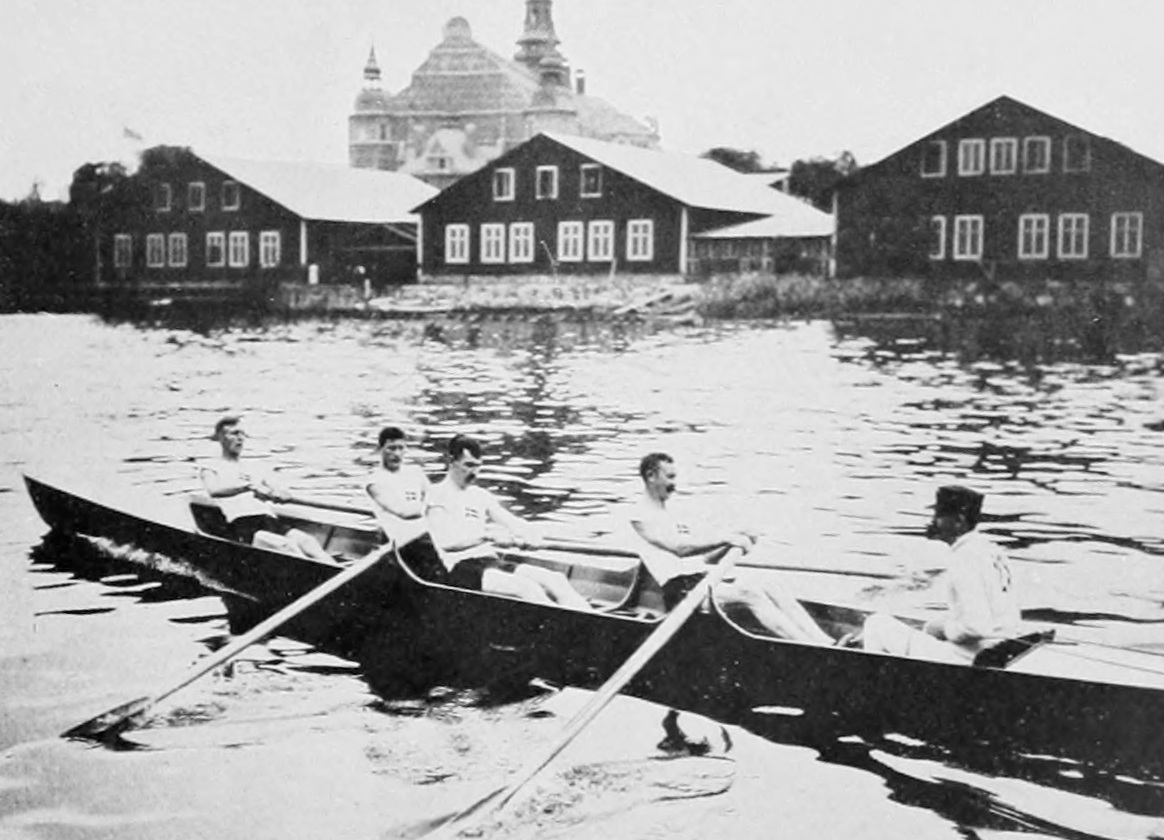
The Danish four from Nykøbing Falster Roklub at the 1912 Olympics

Carl Martin August Møller (24 August 1887 in Aarhus, Denmark – 27 August 1948 in US) was a Danish rower who competed in the 1912 Summer Olympics.

He was a crew member of the Danish boat, which won the gold medal in the coxed fours, inriggers.

He represented Nykøbing Falster Roklub.
