= William Bruhn-Möller =

Swedish rower (1887–1964)

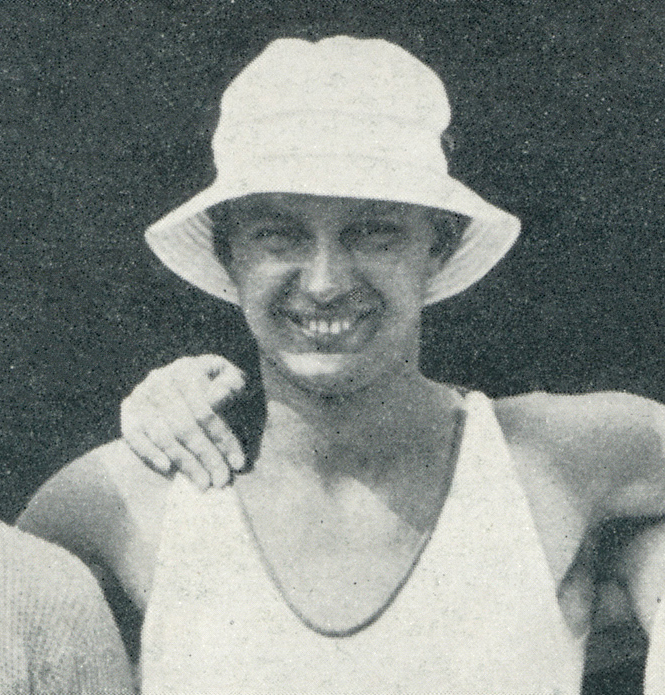

Personal information
- Born: 11 February 1887 Helsingborg, Sweden
- Died: 13 August 1964 (aged 77) Bromma, Stockholm, Sweden

Sport
- Sport: Rowing
- Club: Stockholms RK
Medal record
Representing Sweden
Olympic Games
Silver medal – second place	1912 Stockholm	Coxed four, inriggers

William Bruhn-Möller (11 February 1887 – 13 August 1964) was a Swedish rower who competed in the 1912 Summer Olympics. He won a silver medal in the coxed four, inriggers, and failed to reach the finals of the eight tournament.
