= Leo Wilkens =

Swedish coxswain

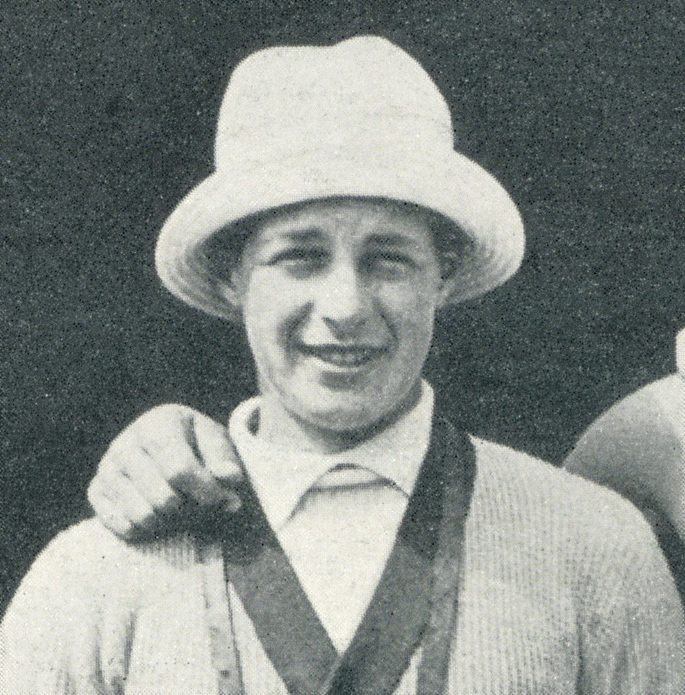

Personal information
- Born: 25 November 1893 Malmö, Sweden
- Died: 4 January 1967 (aged 73) Greenwich, Connecticut, United States
- Weight: 54 kg (119 lb)

Sport
- Sport: Rowing
- Club: Stockholms RK
Medal record
Representing Sweden
Olympic Games
Silver medal – second place	1912 Stockholm	Coxed four, inriggers

Leo Wilhelm "Willie" Wilkens (25 November 1893 – 4 January 1967) was a Swedish rowing coxswain who competed in the 1912 Summer Olympics. He won a silver medal in the coxed four, inriggers, and failed to reach the finals of the eight tournament.
