= Mikael Hestdahl =

Norwegian wrestler

- Born: 13 November 1890; Alversund, Norway
- Died: 13 October 1918 (aged 27); Argonne, France

Mikael Hestdahl (13 November 1890 – 13 October 1918) was a Norwegian wrestler. He competed in the featherweight event at the 1912 Summer Olympics. He was killed in the Meuse-Argonne Offensive during World War I.
