= Alfred Thielemann =

Norwegian sport shooter (1869–1954)

Personal information
- Born: 25 March 1869 Drammen, Norway
- Died: 20 December 1954 (aged 85) Drammen, Norway

Sport
- Sport: Sports shooting

Alfred Thielemann (25 March 1869 – 20 December 1954) was a Norwegian sport shooter. He was born in Drammen, and his club was Riflen. He competed in military rifle at the 1912 Summer Olympics in Stockholm.
