= Poul Hartmann =

Danish coxswain

Olympic medal record

Men's rowing

Representing Denmark
Gold medal – first place	1912 Stockholm	Coxed four, inriggers

Poul Richard Hartmann (1 May 1878 – 29 June 1969) was a Danish rowing coxswain who competed in the 1912 Summer Olympics.

He coxed the Danish boat that won the gold medal in the coxed fours, inriggers.
