= Charles Gabrielsson =

Swedish rower

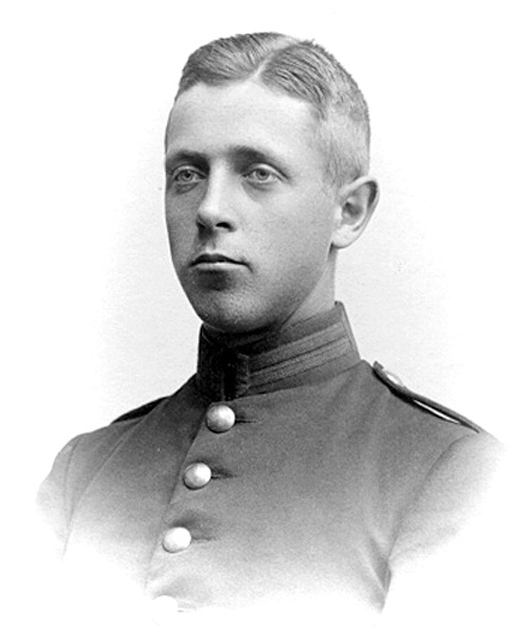

Personal information
- Born: 7 October 1884 Gothenburg, Sweden
- Died: 16 April 1976 (aged 91) Göteborg, Sweden

Sport
- Sport: Rowing
- Club: Göteborgs RF

Charles Adolf Gabrielsson (7 October 1884 – 16 April 1976) was a Swedish rower who competed in the 1912 Summer Olympics. Together with his younger brother Axel he was a crew member of the boat Göteborgs that was eliminated in the quarter-finals of the coxed four, inriggers tournament. He was married to Elvira Davida, a woman two year his junior.
