= Gunnar Grantz =

Norwegian rower

Personal information
- Nationality: Norwegian
- Born: 27 January 1885
- Died: 8 February 1941 (aged 56)

Sport
- Sport: Rowing
- Club: Christiania RK

Gunnar Huseland Grantz (27 January 1885 – 8 February 1941) was a Norwegian rower who competed for Christiania Roklub. He competed in the eight and in the coxed four, inriggers at the 1912 Summer Olympics in Stockholm. He died in the United States.
