= Carl Pedersen (rower) =

Danish rower

Olympic medal record

Men's rowing

Representing Denmark
Gold medal – first place	1912 Stockholm	Coxed four, inriggers

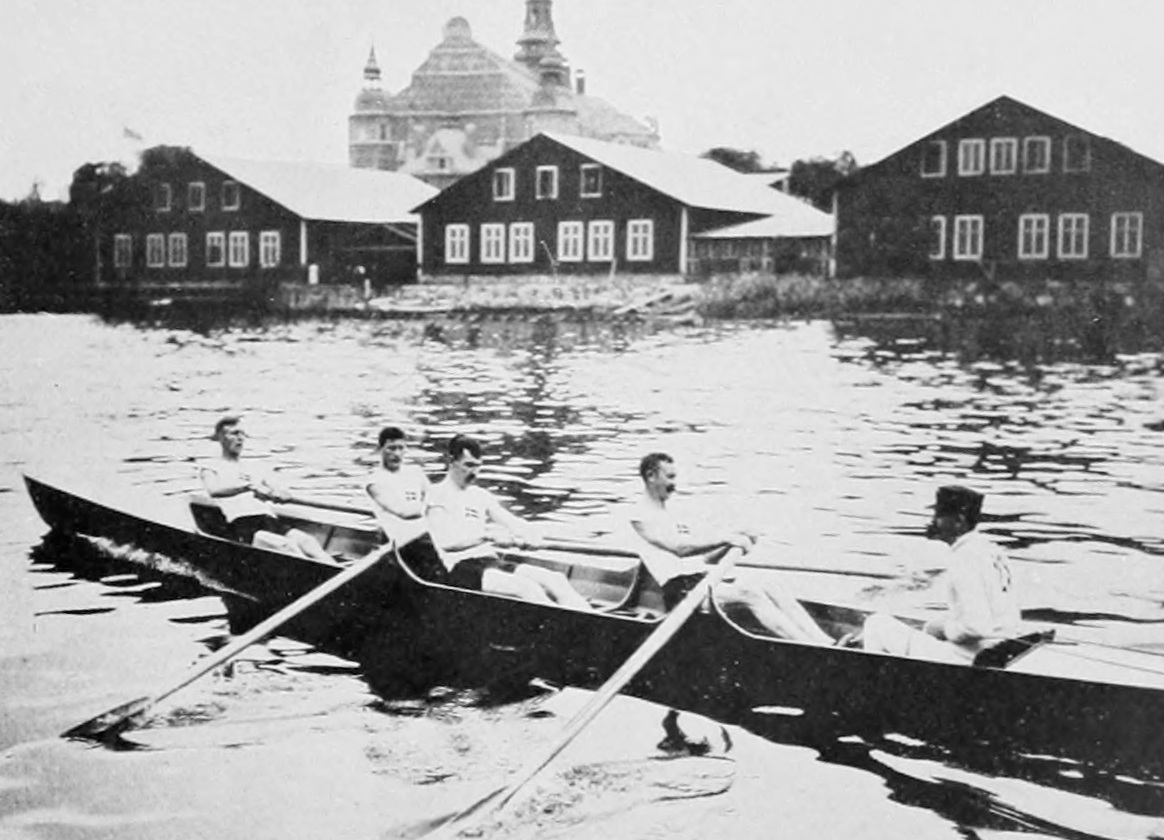
The Danish coxless four from Nykøbing Falster Roklub at the 1912 Olympics

Carl Frederik Pedersen (30 September 1884 in Øster Ulslev, Guldborgsund, Denmark – 3 September 1968 in Nykøbing Falster, Denmark) was a Danish rower who competed in the 1912 Summer Olympics.

He was the strokeman of the Danish boat, which won the gold medal in the coxed four, inriggers.
