= Jens Falkenberg =

Norwegian equestrian (1875–1963)

Personal information
- Nationality: Norwegian
- Born: 6 May 1875 Kristiansand, Norway
- Died: 26 March 1963 (aged 87)

Sport
- Sport: Equestrian

Jens Falkenberg (6 May 1875 – 26 March 1963) was a Norwegian equestrian. He was born in Kristiansand. He competed at the 1912 Summer Olympics in Stockholm, and at the 1920 Summer Olympics in Antwerp.
