= Axel Gabrielsson =

Swedish rower

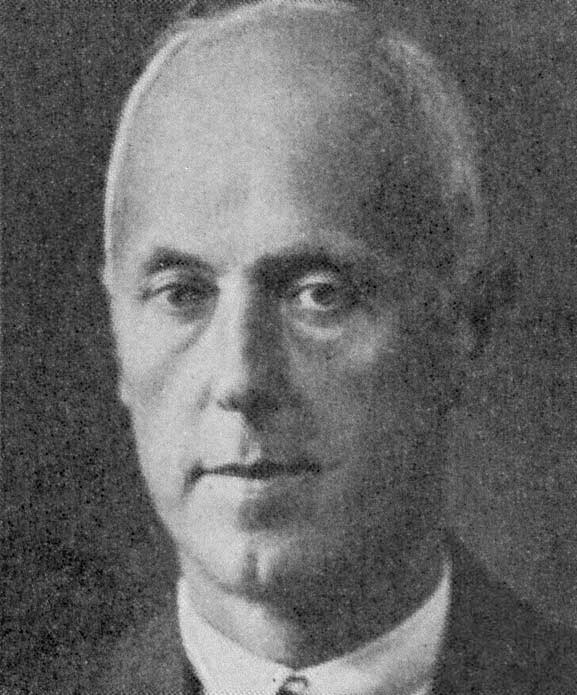

Personal information
- Born: 20 September 1886 Gothenburg, Sweden
- Died: 16 April 1976 (aged 88) 1 June 1975, Sweden

Sport
- Sport: Rowing
- Club: Göteborgs RF

Axel Robert Gabrielsson (20 September 1886 – 1 June 1975) was a Swedish rower who competed in the 1912 Summer Olympics. Together with his elder brother Charles he was a crew member of the boat Göteborgs that was eliminated in the quarter-finals of the coxed fours, inriggers tournament.
