= Nils Gabrielsson =

Swedish politician (1876–1948)

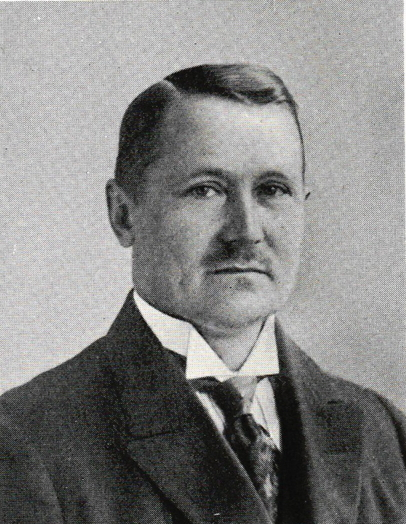
Nils Gabrielsson in 1876

Nils Gabrielsson (April 14, 1876 in Umeå – November 18, 1948 Oscar Parish, Stockholm) was a Swedish politician. He was a member of the Centre Party.

Gabrielsson was a member of the Första kammaren of the Riksdag 1922–1946, elected in the Västerbotten County and Norrbotten County constituencies as well as a county council member from 1919. He belonged to the Farmers' union until 1925 but in 1926 switched to the National Party of the Upper House, which later numbered in the Moderate Party.

Nils Gabrielsson was married to Nanny Matilda. They were the parents of Lennart and Erik Gabrielsson. The Gabrielssons are buried in Backen's cemetery in Umeå.
