= Olaf Solberg =

Norwegian rower

Olaf Solberg (10 February 1885 – 31 July 1968) was a Norwegian rower who competed for Christiania Roklub. He competed in eight and in coxed four, inriggers at the 1912 Summer Olympics in Stockholm.
