= Herman Dahlbäck =

Swedish rower (1891–1968)

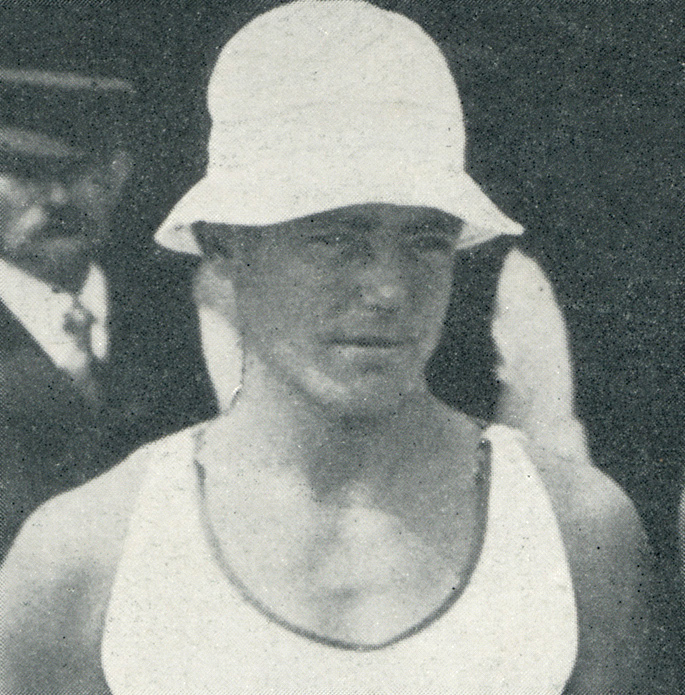

Personal information
- Born: 7 March 1891 Malmö, Sweden
- Died: 16 July 1968 (aged 77) Malmö, Sweden

Sport
- Sport: Rowing
- Club: Stockholms RK
Medal record
Representing Sweden
Olympic Games
Silver medal – second place	1912 Stockholm	Coxed four, inriggers

Nils Herman Dahlbäck (7 March 1891 – 16 July 1968) was a Swedish rower who competed in the 1912 Summer Olympics. He won a silver medal in the coxed four, inriggers, and failed to reach the finals of the eight tournament. Dahlbäck worked as a customs inspector in Malmö.
