= John Bjørnstad =

Norwegian rowing cox

John Vilhelm Bjørnstad (9 March 1888 – 3 June 1968) was a Norwegian rowing coxswain who competed for Christiania Roklub. He competed in coxed fours (inriggers) and in the men's eight at the 1912 Summer Olympics in Stockholm.
