= Johannes Jordell =

Norwegian sport shooter (1879–1958)

Personal information
- Born: 24 June 1879 Arendal, Norway
- Died: 23 August 1958 (aged 79) Oslo, Norway

Sport
- Sport: Sports shooting

Johannes Jordell (24 June 1879 – 23 August 1958) was a Norwegian sport shooter. He was born in Arendal, and his club was Oslo Sportsskyttere. He competed in military rifle and small-bore rifle at the 1912 Summer Olympics in Stockholm.
