= Ejler Allert =

Danish rower (1881–1959)

Olympic medal record

Men's rowing

Representing Denmark
Gold medal – first place	1912 Stockholm	Coxed four, inriggers

Ejler Arild Emil Allert (27 November 1881 in Tingsted, Denmark – 25 March 1959 in Rødovre, Denmark) was a Danish rower who competed in the 1912 Summer Olympics.

He was a crew member of the Danish boat, which won the gold medal in the coxed four, inriggers.
