= Charles Herlofson =

Norwegian footballer (1891–1968)

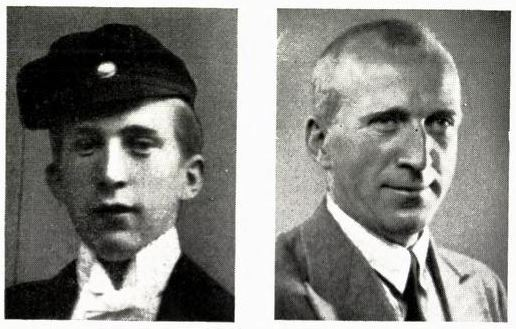
Norwegian soccer player Charles Herlofson (1891–1968)

Charles Herlofson (15 June 1891 – 9 November 1968) was a Norwegian footballer.

He was born in Kristiania. He played for the club Mercantile, and also for the Norwegian national team. He competed at the 1912 Summer Olympics in Stockholm. He was a brother of rower Harald Herlofson and the father of naval officer Charles Oluf Herlofson.
