= Harald Herlofson =

Norwegian rower

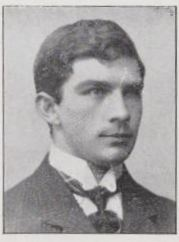

Personal information
- Nationality: Norwegian
- Born: 18 February 1887
- Died: 17 November 1957 (aged 70)

Sport
- Sport: Rowing
- Club: Christiania RK

Harald Herlofson (18 February 1887 – 17 November 1957) was a Norwegian rower who competed for Christiania Roklub. He competed in men's eight at the 1912 Summer Olympics in Stockholm. He was the brother of footballer Charles Herlofson.
