= Elias Gabrielsen =

Norwegian trade unionist, newspaper editor and politician

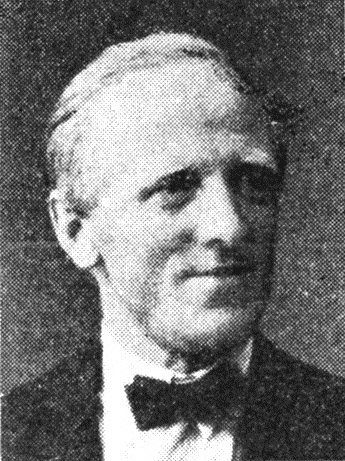
Elias Gabrielsen

Elias Gabrielsen (5 December 1888 – 1973) was a Norwegian trade unionist, newspaper editor and politician for the Labour and Communist parties.

== Biography ==
He spent his early working career at sea, before working at a margarine factory in Stavanger from 1916. In the same year he joined the Labour Party. He was a local board member of the Union of General Workers from 1917 to 1921 and the Union of Food, Beverage and Allied Workers from 1922 to 1925.

In 1923 he broke away from the Labour Party, joining the new Communist Party. He immediately became county leader in Rogaland and national board member. After leaving the national board in 1925 he joined the central board. He stood for election in Rogaland in 1924, 1927 and 1930. From 1926 to 1927 he edited the newspaper Rogaland Arbeiderblad.

During the occupation of Norway by Nazi Germany, he was arrested on 12 August 1943. He was imprisoned in Stavanger until 23 October, then in Grini concentration camp until 3 August 1944. He was then sent to Sachsenhausen concentration camp and imprisoned there until the war's end.
