= Olav Bjørnstad =

Norwegian rowing cox

Olympic medal record

Men's rowing
Bronze medal – third place	1912 Stockholm	Coxed four, inriggers

Olav Trygve Olsen-Bjørnstad (16 December 1882 – 13 June 1963) was a Norwegian rowing coxswain who competed in the 1912 Summer Olympics.

He coxed the Norwegian boat that won the bronze medal in the coxed four, inriggers.
