= Frithjof Olstad =

Norwegian rower

Olympic medal record

Men's rowing
Bronze medal – third place	1912 Stockholm	Coxed four, inriggers

Karl Frithjof Olstad (23 November 1890 – 16 December 1956) was a Norwegian rower who competed in the 1912 Summer Olympics.

He was the strokeman of the Norwegian boat that won the bronze medal in the coxed four, inriggers.
