= Claus Høyer =

Norwegian rower

Olympic medal record

Men's rowing
Bronze medal – third place	1912 Stockholm	Coxed four, inriggers

Claus Owrén Høyer (17 March 1891 – 2 November 1964) was a Norwegian rower who competed in the 1912 Summer Olympics.

He was the bowman of the Norwegian boat that won the bronze medal in the coxed four, inriggers.
