= Reidar Holter =

Norwegian rower

Olympic medal record

Men's rowing
Bronze medal – third place	1912 Stockholm	Coxed four, inriggers

Reidar Durie Holter (28 December 1892 – 19 June 1953) was a Norwegian rower who competed in the 1912 Summer Olympics.

== Early life ==
Holter was born in Oslo. He was a crew member of the Norwegian boat that won the bronze medal in the coxed four, inriggers.

== Death ==
Holter died in Los Angeles in 1953 at the age of 60.
