= Max Herseth =

Norwegian rower and speed skater

Olympic medal record

Men's rowing
Bronze medal – third place	1912 Stockholm	Coxed four, inriggers

Magnus Herseth (25 April 1892 – 13 September 1976), known as Max Herseth, was a Norwegian rower who competed in the 1912 Summer Olympics.

He was a crew member of the Norwegian boat that won the bronze medal in the coxed four, inriggers. He died on 13 September 1976.
