= Dragutin Tomašević =

Serbian long-distance runner

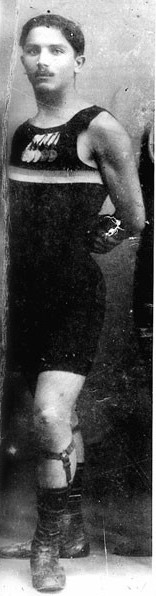
- Tomašević at the 1912 Summer Olympics

Personal information
- Full name: Dragutin Tomašević
- Nationality: Serbian
- Born: 20 April 1890 Bistrica, Serbia
- Died: October 1915 (aged 25) Rašanac, Serbia

Sport
- Country: (Kingdom of Serbia) Serbia
- Sport: Athletics

Dragutin Tomašević (Serbian Cyrillic: Драгутин Томашевић; 20 April 1890 – October 1915) was a Serbian track and field athlete and gymnast who competed in the men's marathon at the 1912 Summer Olympics in Stockholm, Sweden, the first Olympic Games in which Serbia participated. He was also chosen to be Serbia's flag bearer at that year's opening ceremony, thereby becoming the first Serbian to carry his country's flag at the Olympic Games.

The men's marathon, which lasted 40.2 kilometres (25.0 mi), took place on 14 July amid record heat; half the runners did not finish. Tomašević emerged from the marathon "battered and bruised", finishing 37th out of sixty-eight runners in two hours and 47 minutes. The cause of his injuries remains unknown, but one modern sports writer speculates that Tomašević may have suffered a fall during the run.

Following the outbreak of World War I, Tomašević was conscripted by the Royal Serbian Army. He was killed during a skirmish with soldiers of the Imperial German Army in October 1915. Following his death, he became the subject of several urban legends concerning his athletic prowess. Tomašević's native village contains a museum dedicated to his sporting achievements. A commemorative marathon named after Tomašević is held in his native Petrovac na Mlavi every year and a street in Belgrade carries his name.

== Biography ==
Dragutin Tomašević was born on 20 April 1890 in the village of Bistrica, near the town of Petrovac na Mlavi, to Miloš and Stana Tomašević. His father was a merchant and his mother was a seamstress. At the age of 15, his parents sent him to Serbia's capital, Belgrade, to receive an education. From a young age, Tomašević had exhibited a talent for athletics and gymnastics, and upon arriving in Belgrade, he joined a local Sokol organization named after the medieval Serbian emperor Dušan the Mighty. Tomašević also competed for the Belgrade Sports Club (Serbian: Beogradski sport klub; BSK), specializing in the marathon. He won the 33-kilometre (21 mi) Obrenovac–Košutnjak marathon on ten separate occasions. His first-place finish at the Obrenovac–Košutnjak marathon of May 1911, which involved forty other competitors, qualified him to participate in the men's marathon at the 1912 Summer Olympics in Stockholm, Sweden, the first Olympic Games in which Serbia took part.

Tomašević was one of the first two citizens of Serbia to participate in the Olympics, the other being the sprinter Dušan Milošević. The first Serb to participate in the Olympics was Momčilo Tapavica (Hungarian: Tapavicza Momcsilló), a Habsburg Serb who competed for Hungary at the inaugural 1896 Summer Olympics and won a bronze medal in tennis in the men's singles competition. At his official farewell before departing for Sweden, Tomašević was presented with a loaf of traditional Serbian bread and a wicker bag by the country's sports and government officials. He was Serbia's flag bearer at the opening ceremony on 6 July 1912, thereby becoming the first Serbian to carry his country's flag at an Olympic opening ceremony.

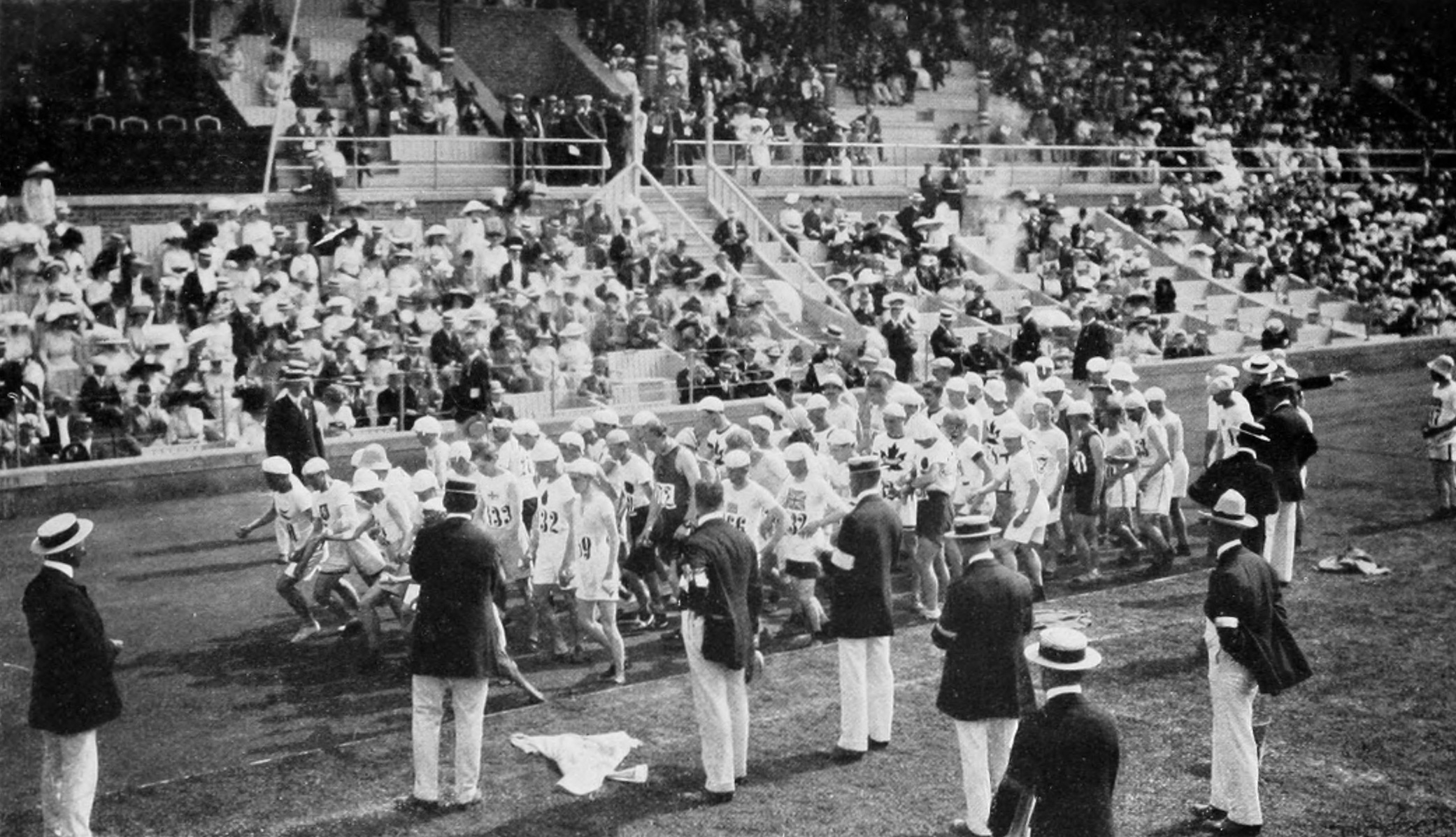
The start of the men's marathon at the 1912 Summer Olympics

The men's marathon, which lasted 40.2 kilometres (25.0 mi), took place on 14 July amid record-breaking heat; half the participants did not finish. The Portuguese marathon runner Francisco Lázaro died of heat exhaustion, the first of only two athletes ever to die in competition during the Olympic Games. Tomašević completed the marathon in two hours and 47 minutes, and finished 37th out of sixty-eight runners, prompting speculation in the Serbian tabloid press that he had been poisoned by "a beautiful Swedish blonde" or "pushed into a ditch" and held there so as to be prevented from winning. "As he came in battered and bruised," the sports writer Nigel McCrery writes, "it seems more likely that he fell or was pushed and injured, explaining his condition." The gold medal was won by South Africa's Ken McArthur, the silver by another South African, Christian Gitsham, and the bronze by the American Gaston Strobino.

Upon returning to Serbia, Tomašević began preparing for the 1916 Summer Olympics, which were never held due to the outbreak of World War I. In July 1914, he was conscripted into the Royal Serbian Army and assigned to the 18th Infantry Regiment. By October 1915, he had reached the rank of sergeant. That month, he was seriously wounded while taking part in a skirmish with the Imperial German Army on Bubanj Hill, near Požarevac. Tomašević's fellow soldiers dragged him to cover and he was evacuated from the front, but soon succumbed to his injuries in the village of Rašanac, near Petrovac na Mlavi. Tomašević's body was subsequently returned to his native village and buried in his family's tomb, alongside the trophies he had won during his lifetime. The epitaph on his gravestone reads: "He is buried with his mother and his courage."

== Legacy ==
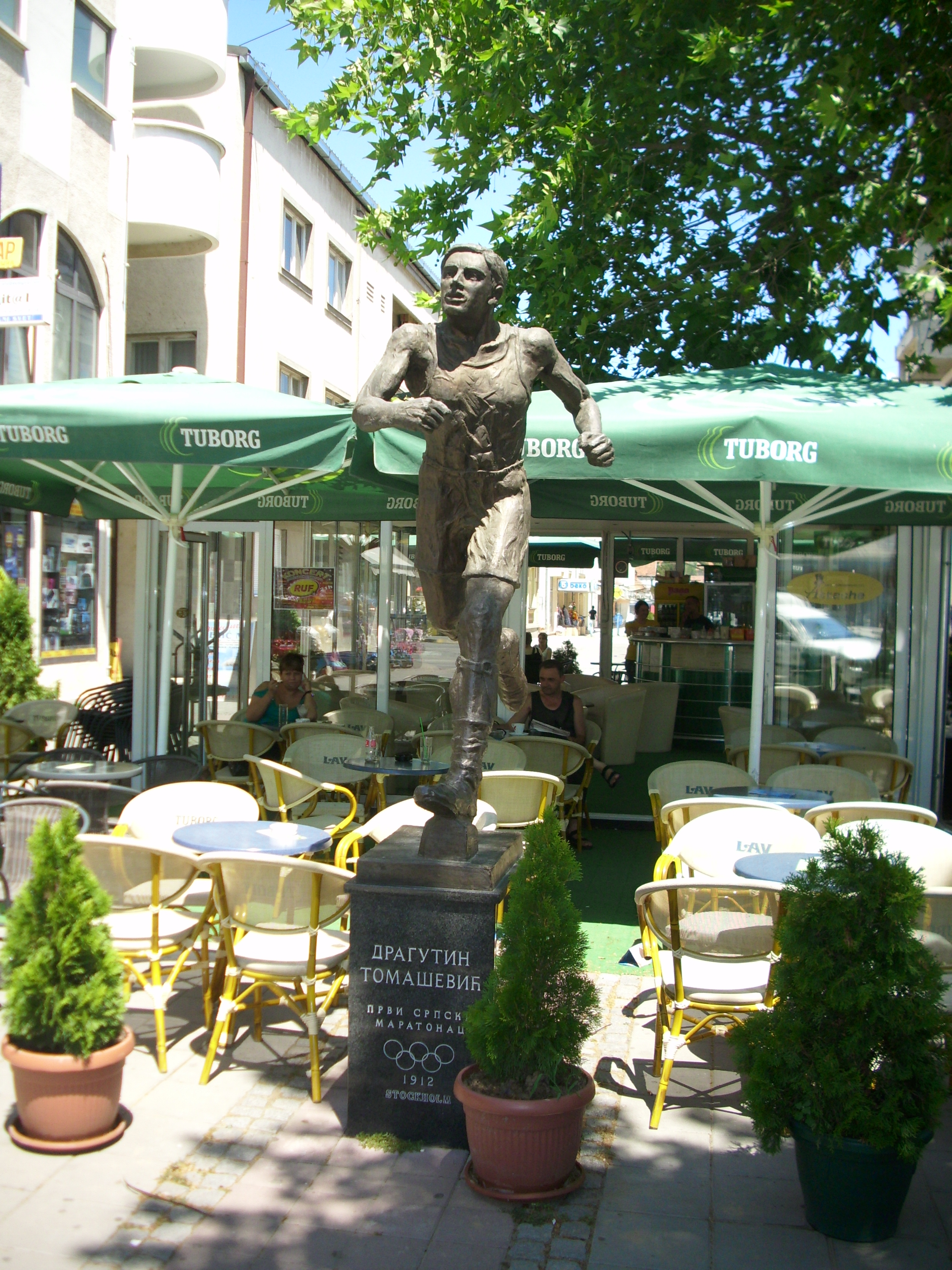
A life-size statue of Tomašević in Petrovac na Mlavi

A myth that surfaced following Tomašević's death holds that the pathologist who examined his cadaver discovered that the athlete had been born with two hearts. Another urban legend holds that, in 1909, Tomašević was challenged to race a train from Požarevac to Petrovac na Mlavi by a Serbian transportation firm. He is said to have been waiting for the train as it arrived at the station, to the astonishment of the train conductor and the company's executives.

Tomašević's native village contains a museum dedicated to his sporting achievements. A commemorative marathon that takes in Petrovac na Mlavi every year has been named in his honour and a street in Belgrade bears his name. McCrery describes Tomašević as "one of Serbia's greatest sporting heroes."

== See also ==
- List of Olympians killed in World War I

Olympic Games
Preceded by None	Flagbearer for Serbia; Stockholm 1912	Succeeded by Stane Perpar (for Yugoslavia)
