= Serbia at the 1912 Summer Olympics =

- IOC code: SRB
- NOC: Olympic Committee of Serbia

in Stockholm
- Competitors: 3 in 1 sport
- Flag bearer: Dragutin Tomašević
- Medals: Gold 0 Silver 0 Bronze 0 Total 0

Summer Olympics appearances (overview)
- 1912; 1920–2004; 2008; 2012; 2016; 2020; 2024

Other related appearances
- Yugoslavia (1920–1992 W); Independent Olympic Participants (1992 S); Serbia and Montenegro (1996–2006)

Serbia sent two athletes that competed in the 1912 Summer Olympics in Stockholm, Sweden. This was the first and only Olympic Games where Serbia participated as an independent nation until the 2008 Summer Olympics. By the next Olympic Games in 1920, Serbian athletes competed for the Kingdom of the Serbs, Croats and Slovenes, which in 1929 changed its name to Yugoslavia (YUG).

== Athletics ==
Three athletes represented Serbia in athletics in the nation's debut at the sport and the Olympics.

Ranks given are within that athlete's heat for running events.

Athlete	Events	Heat		Semifinal		Final	
Athlete	Events	Result	Rank	Result	Rank	Result	Rank
Dušan Milošević	100 m	11.6	3	did not advance			
Dragutin Tomašević	Marathon	N/A				did not finish	
Živko Nastić	Marathon	N/A				did not start	

== Sources ==
- Bergvall, Erik, ed. (December 1913). The Olympic Games of Stockholm 1912 Official Report (PDF). Stockholm: Wahlström and Widstrand. Archived from the original (PDF) on 2008-04-10.
- "Games of the V Olympiad - Stockholm 1912". Olympic Committee of Serbia. Archived from the original on December 18, 2007.
- "The first Olympians of the Kingdom of Serbia". Olympic Committee of Serbia. Archived from the original on December 18, 2007.
