= Krvije =

- Village
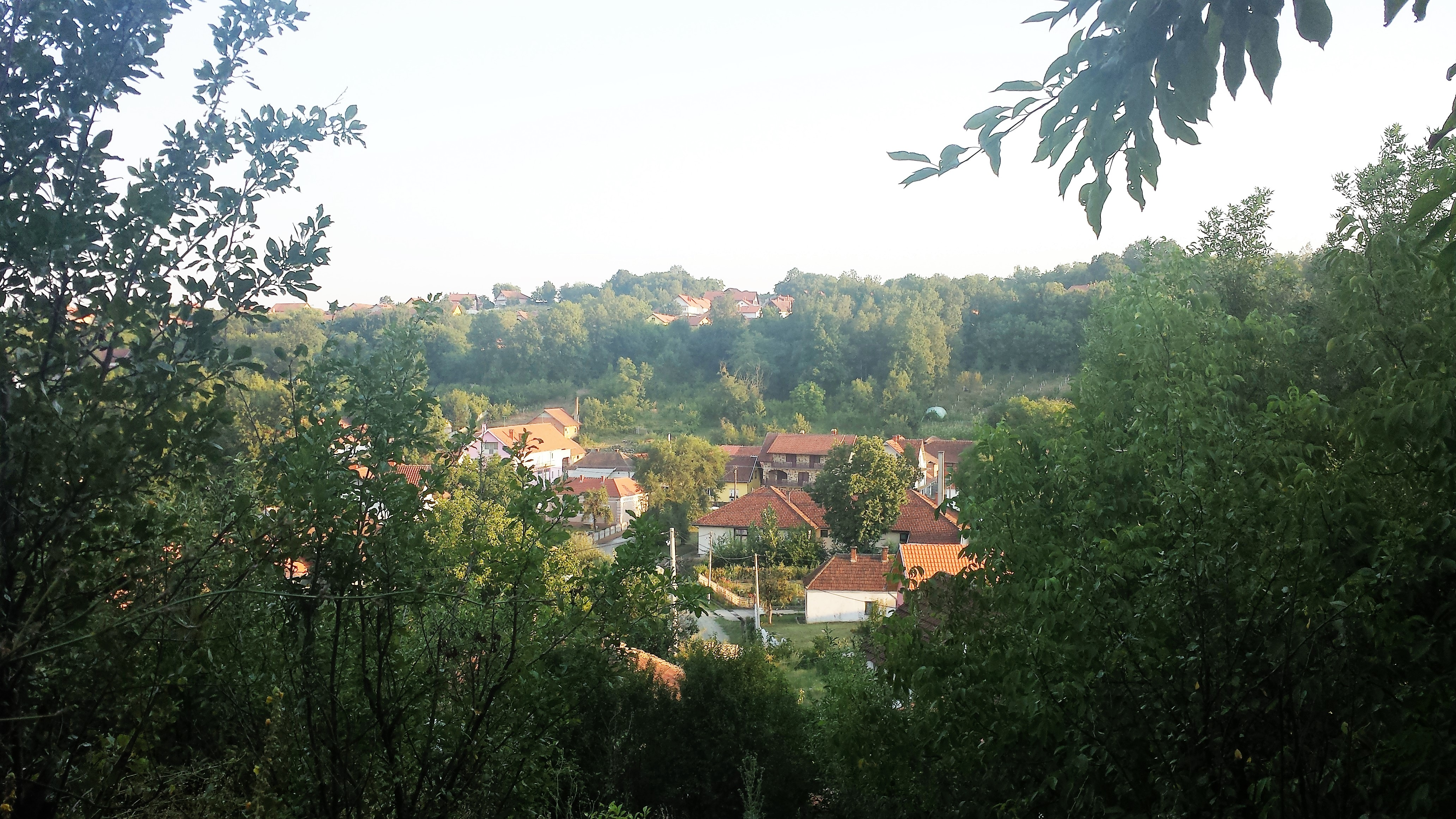

- Location within Serbia
- Coordinates: 44°18′56″N 21°22′59″E
- Country: Serbia
- District: Braničevo District
- Municipality: Petrovac na Mlavi
- Time zone: UTC+1 (CET)
  - Summer (DST): UTC+2 (CEST)

Krvije is a village situated in Petrovac na Mlavi municipality in Serbia.
