= Burovac =

- Village
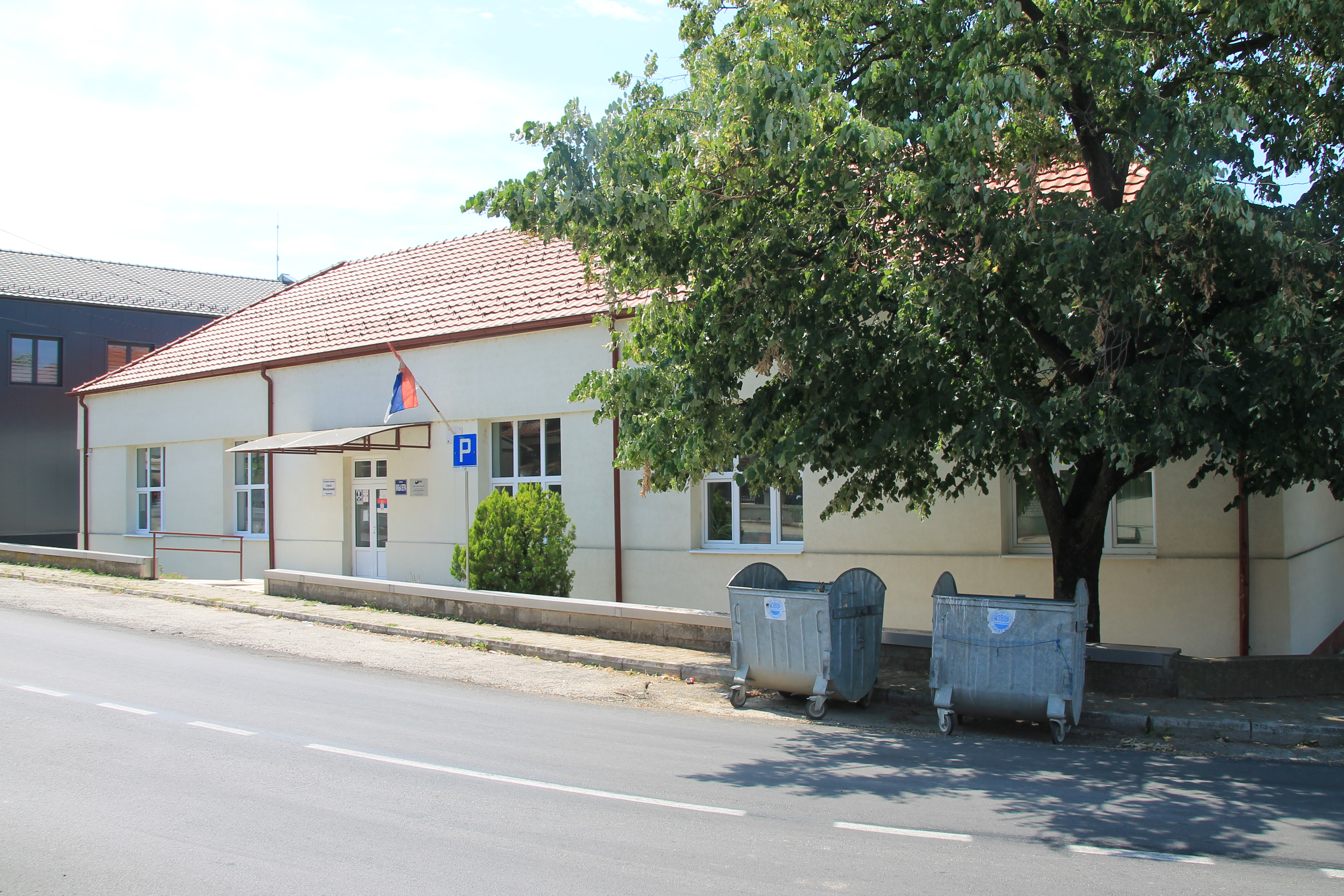
- Burovac

- Location within Serbia
- Coordinates: 44°16′22″N 21°21′28″E
- Country: Serbia
- District: Braničevo District
- Municipality: Petrovac na Mlavi
- Time zone: UTC+1 (CET)
  - Summer (DST): UTC+2 (CEST)

Burovac is a village situated in Petrovac na Mlavi municipality, Braničevo District in Serbia.
