= Dubočka =

- Village
- Location within Serbia
- Coordinates: 44°26′40″N 21°22′30″E
- Country: Serbia
- District: Braničevo
- Municipality: Petrovac na Mlavi
- Time zone: UTC+1 (CET)
  - Summer (DST): UTC+2 (CEST)

Dubočka is a village situated in Petrovac na Mlavi municipality in Serbia.
