= Ćovdin =

Ćovdin Ћовдин
- Village
- Location within Serbia
- Coordinates: 44°15′12″N 21°26′57″E
- Country: Serbia
- District: Braničevo
- Municipality: Petrovac na Mlavi
- Time zone: UTC+1 (CET)
  - Summer (DST): UTC+2 (CEST)

Ćovdin is a village situated in Petrovac na Mlavi municipality, Braničevo District in Serbia.
