= Joseph Forshaw =

Joseph Forshaw may refer to:

- Joseph Forshaw (ornithologist) (fl. 1960s–2010s), Australian ornithologist
- Joseph Forshaw (runner) (1881–1964), American athlete
