= Malo Laole =

- Village
- Location within Serbia
- Coordinates: 44°19′30″N 21°27′51″E
- Country: Serbia
- District: Braničevo District
- Municipality: Petrovac na Mlavi
- Time zone: UTC+1 (CET)
  - Summer (DST): UTC+2 (CEST)

Malo Laole is a village situated in Petrovac na Mlavi municipality in Serbia. There were 635 people living in the village as of a 2002 census. The total number of people is down from 918 as of the 1991 census. The village contains 182 households, which are largely inhabited by Serbs.
