= Vezičevo =

- Village
- Location within Serbia
- Coordinates: 44°14′22″N 21°25′56″E
- Country: Serbia
- District: Braničevo District
- Municipality: Petrovac na Mlavi
- Time zone: UTC+1 (CET)
  - Summer (DST): UTC+2 (CEST)

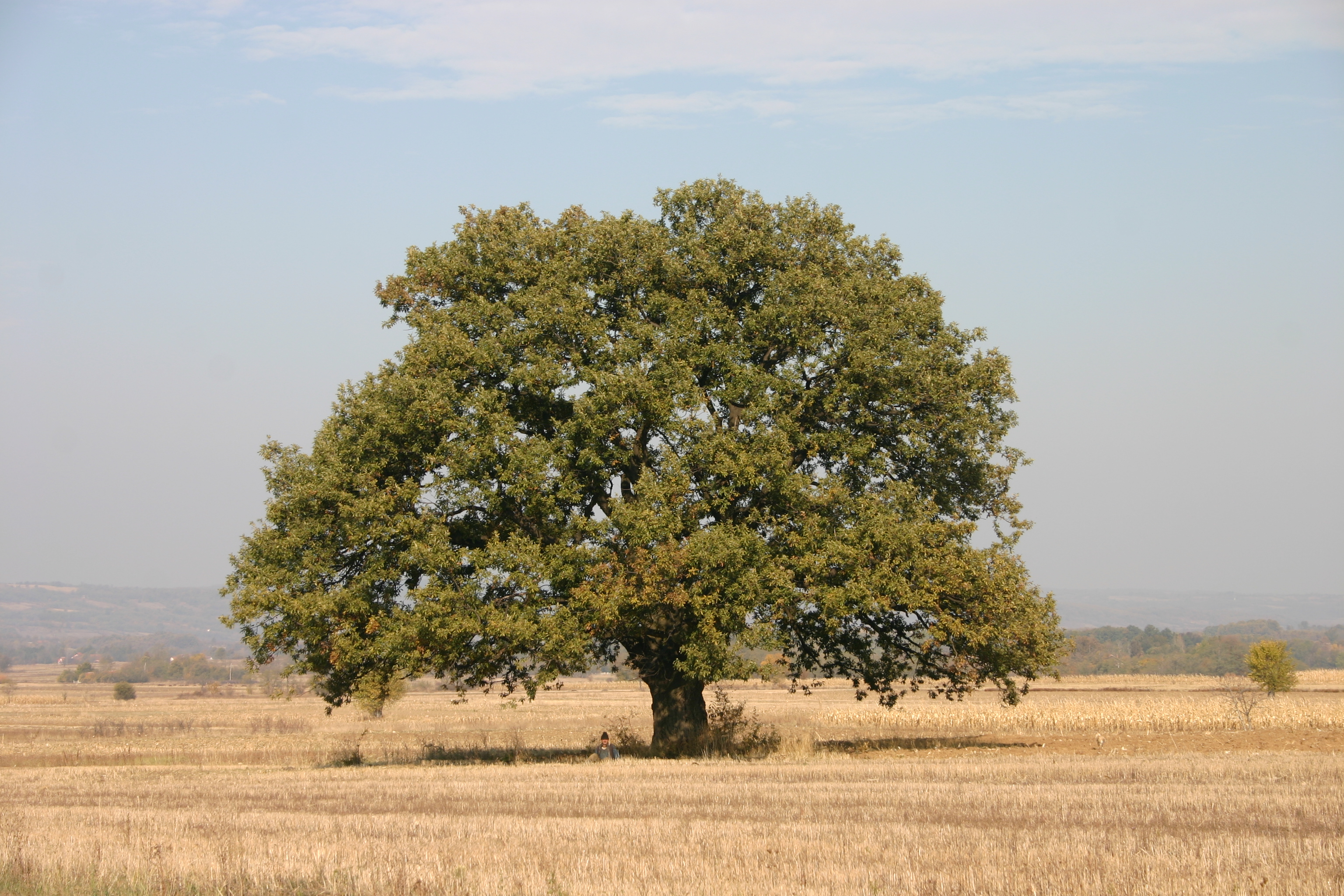
Запис, храст поред пута Бусур-Веѕичево

Vezičevo is a village situated in Petrovac na Mlavi municipality in Serbia.

== Записи у Везичеву ==
Храст, 150м са леве стране пута Бусур-Везичево, око 500м од границе са Бусуром.

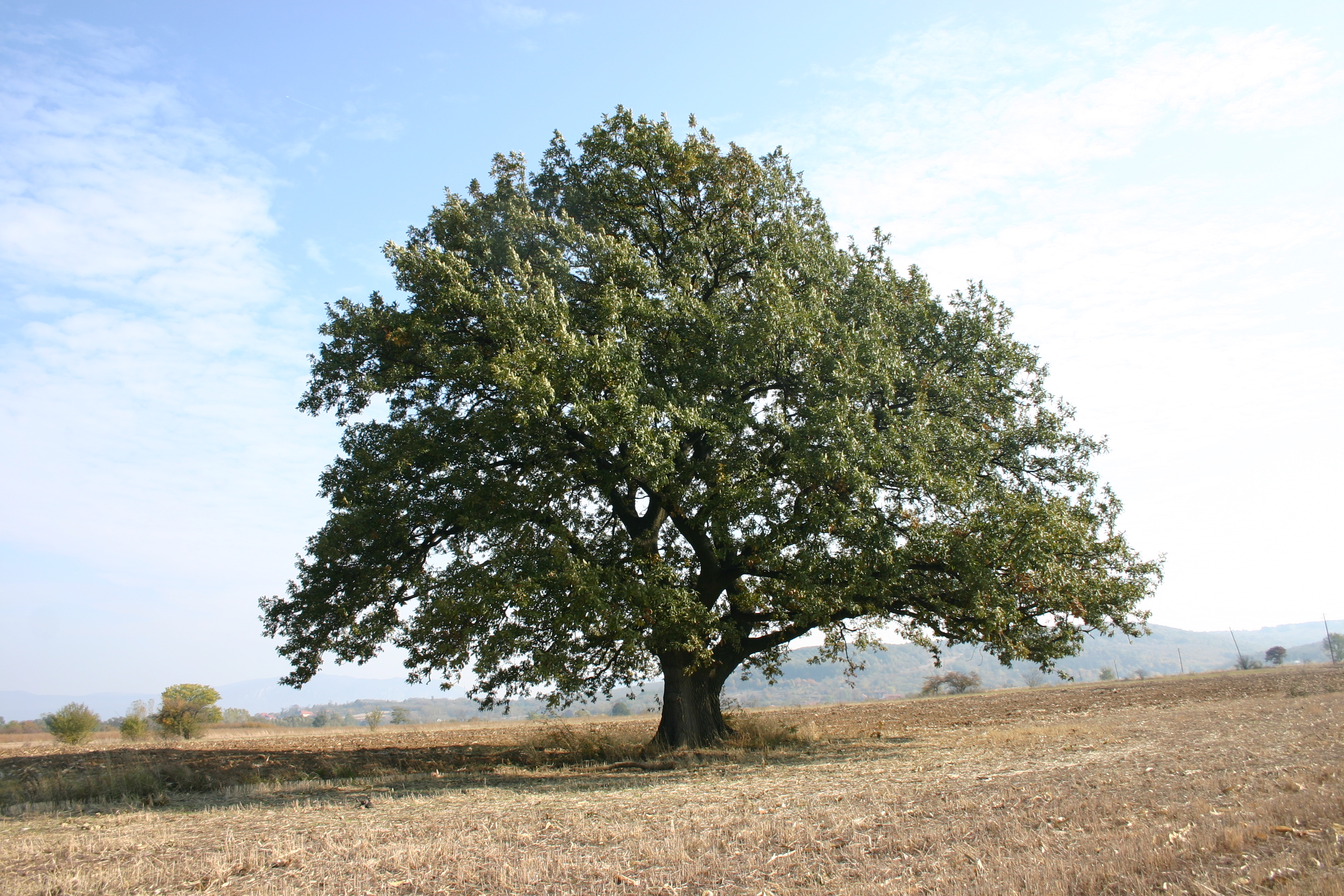
Zapis
