= Gaston Strobino =

American long-distance runner

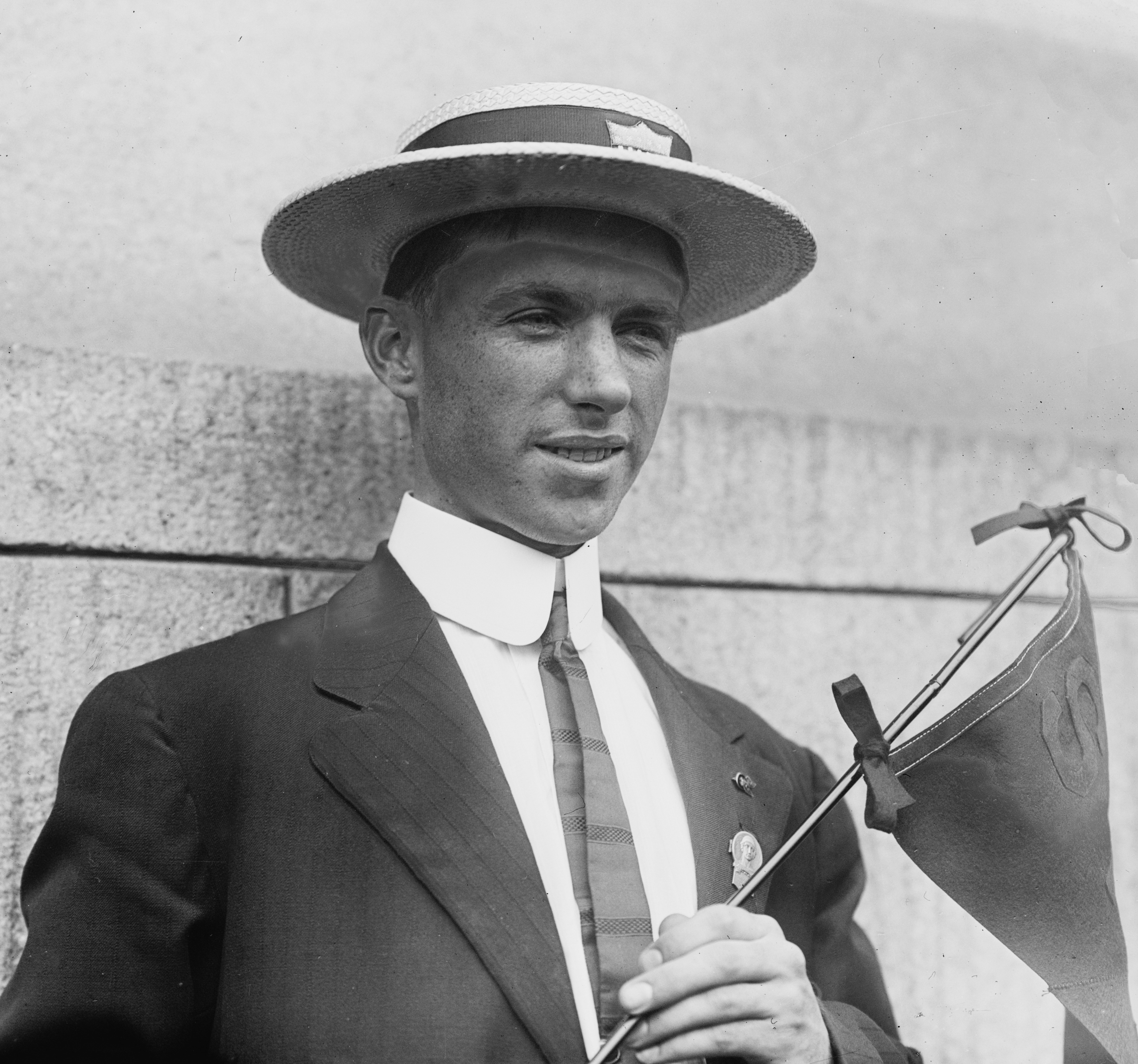

Personal information
- Born: August 23, 1891 Büren an der Aare, Switzerland
- Died: March 30, 1969 (aged 77) Downers Grove, Illinois, United States
- Height: 1.60 m (5 ft 3 in)
- Weight: 50 kg (110 lb)

Sport
- Sport: Long-distance running
- Club: South Paterson AC
Medal record
Representing the United States
Olympic Games
| Bronze medal – third place | 1912 Stockholm | Marathon |

Gaston Maurice Strobino (August 23, 1891 – March 30, 1969) was an American athlete and runner. He won the bronze medal in the marathon event at the 1912 Stockholm Olympics.

== Biography ==
Strobino was born in Büren an der Aare, Switzerland, to an Italian family of Mosso Santa Maria (Biella, Italy) and moved from Italy to Paterson, New Jersey as a young man. He lived in South Paterson and worked as a toolmaker.

== Running career ==
Strobino competed for the United States in the 1912 Summer Olympics held in Stockholm, Sweden in the marathon at the age of 20. The Olympic marathon was the first time he had ever raced the distance before, having qualified in a 12-mile race in New York City.

The race was notable for being run in particularly harsh conditions, with temperatures reaching 86 degrees Fahrenheit. He finished third behind South African runners Ken McArthur and Christian Gitsham, with Strobino suffering from raw and bleeding feet. His bronze medal was the sixth ever won by an American marathon runner.

The Olympics was the only time in his career that Strobino would ever race a marathon.
