= John Gallagher (runner) =

American long-distance runner

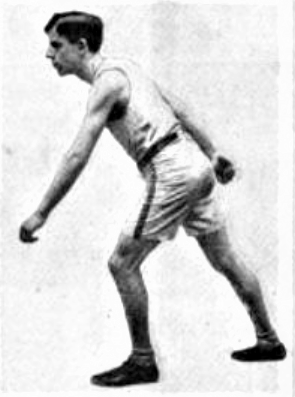

Personal information
- Born: April 13, 1890 Philadelphia, Pennsylvania, United States
- Died: May 13, 1950 (aged 60)

Sport
- Sport: Long-distance running
- Event: Marathon

John J. Gallagher (April 13, 1890 – May 13, 1950) was an American long-distance runner. He competed in the marathon at the 1912 Summer Olympics.

He later attended Georgetown University, becoming captain of its track team. He left school, and became physical director for the Chester Shipbuilding Company in Chester, Pennsylvania in April 1918.

Gallagher competed for the Shanahan Catholic Athletic Club and the Meadowbrook Athletic Club, and married Jennie Devine.
