= Rašanac =

- Village
- Location within Serbia
- Coordinates: 44°27′35″N 21°21′42″E
- Country: Serbia
- District: Braničevo District
- Municipality: Petrovac na Mlavi
- Time zone: UTC+1 (CET)
  - Summer (DST): UTC+2 (CEST)

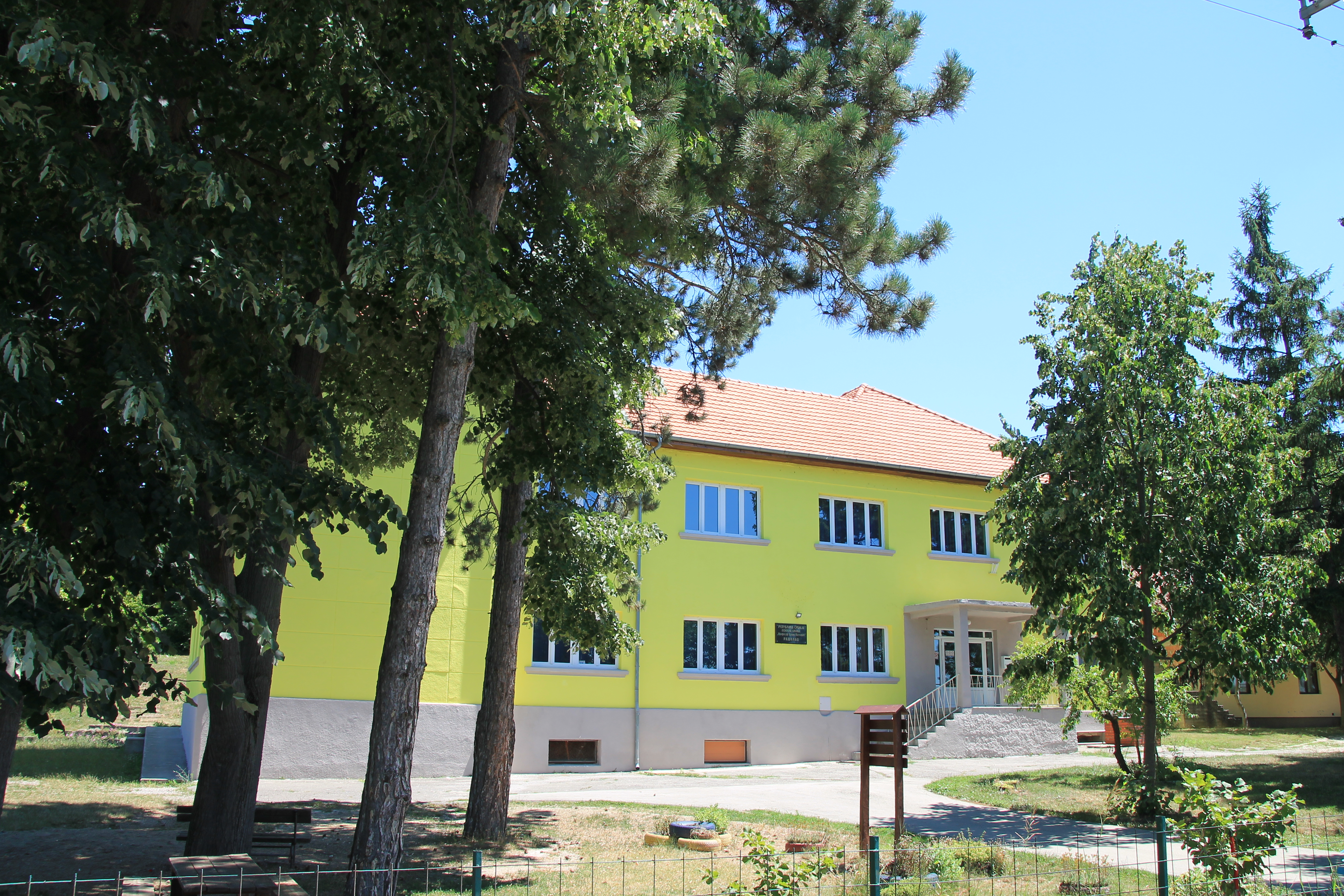
Rašanac

Rašanac is a village situated in Petrovac na Mlavi municipality in Serbia.
