= Edgar Lloyd (athlete) =

British long-distance runner

Personal information
- Nationality: British
- Born: 31 July 1886 Lewisham, London, England
- Died: 3 January 1972 (aged 85) Bromley, London, England

Sport
- Sport: Long-distance running
- Event: Marathon

Edgar Lloyd (31 July 1886 – 3 January 1972) was a British long-distance runner. He competed in the marathon at the 1912 Summer Olympics.
