= Johannes Christensen =

Danish long-distance runner

Personal information
- Nationality: Danish
- Born: 14 February 1889 Frederiksberg, Denmark
- Died: 23 April 1957 (aged 68) Hillerød, Denmark

Sport
- Sport: Long-distance running
- Event: Marathon

Johannes Christensen (14 February 1889 – 23 April 1957) was a Danish long-distance runner. He competed in the marathon at the 1912 Summer Olympics.
