= William Forsyth (athlete) =

Canadian long-distance runner

Personal information
- Born: 20 January 1891 Saint Mary's, Ontario, Canada
- Died: 1 July 1939 (aged 48)

Sport
- Sport: Long-distance running
- Event: Marathon

William Forsyth (20 January 1891 – 1 July 1939) was a Canadian long-distance runner. He competed in the marathon at the 1912 Summer Olympics.
