= Renon Boissière =

French long-distance runner

Renon Boussière
Personal information
- Nationality: French
- Born: 31 August 1882 Amfreville-sous-les-Monts, France
- Died: 25 September 1915 (aged 33) Ville-sur-Tourbe, France

Sport
- Sport: Long-distance running
- Event: Marathon

Renon Boussière (31 August 1882 – 25 September 1915) was a French long-distance runner. He competed in the marathon at the 1912 Summer Olympics. He was killed in action during World War I.

== See also ==
- List of Olympians killed in World War I
