= Sigfrid Jacobsson =

Swedish long-distance runner

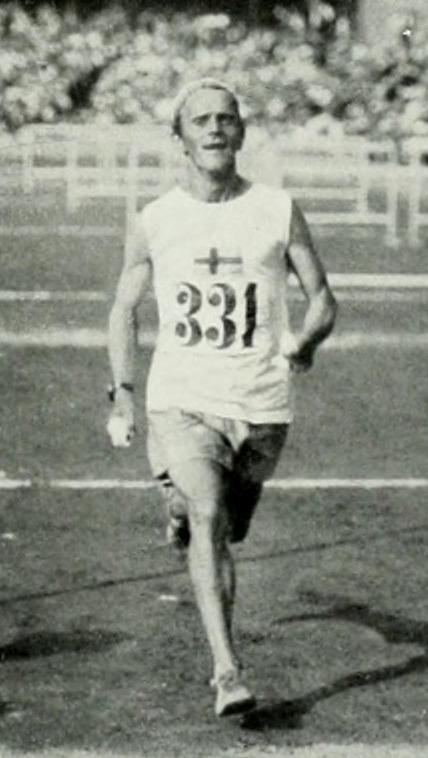
- Jacobsson finishing the marathon in 1912

Personal information
- Nationality: Swedish
- Born: 4 June 1883 Helsinki, Finland
- Died: 20 July 1961 (aged 78) Stockholm, Sweden

Sport
- Sport: Long-distance running
- Event: Marathon
- Club: Södermalms IK, Bromma

Sigfrid Jacobsson (4 June 1883 – 20 July 1961) was a Swedish long-distance runner. He competed in the marathon at the 1912 Summer Olympics and finished sixth.
