= Otto Osen =

Norwegian long-distance runner

Personal information
- Nationality: Norwegian
- Born: 4 July 1882 Roan, Norway
- Died: 3 November 1950 (aged 68) Trondheim, Norway

Sport
- Sport: Long-distance running
- Event: Marathon

Otto Osen (4 July 1882 – 3 November 1950) was a Norwegian long-distance runner. He was born in Roan, but represented the club SK Brage in Trondheim. He finished 34th in the marathon at the 1912 Summer Olympics. His personal best time was 2:59.25 hours, achieved in 1912.
