= Jacob Westberg =

Swedish long-distance runner

Personal information
- Nationality: Swedish
- Born: 15 December 1885 Stockholm, Sweden
- Died: 9 August 1933 (aged 47)

Sport
- Sport: Long-distance running
- Event: Marathon

Jacob Westberg (15 December 1885 – 9 August 1933) was a Swedish long-distance runner. He competed in the marathon at the 1912 Summer Olympics.
