= Joseph Erxleben =

American long-distance runner

- Erxleben in 1912

Personal information
- Nationality: American
- Born: September 15, 1889
- Died: August 29, 1973 (aged 83)

Sport
- Sport: Running
- Event: Marathon
- Club: Missouri Athletic Club

Joseph John Erxleben (September 15, 1889 – August 29, 1973) was an American long-distance runner who competed in the marathon at the 1912 Summer Olympics in Stockholm.

== Pre-Olympic accomplishments ==
Erxleben was from St. Louis, Missouri and competed for the Missouri Athletic Club. He had a younger brother, Hermann, who was reported to have won a five-mile "junior marathon" at the age of 16.

Erxleben won a 15-mile race at a meet in the St. Louis Coliseum hosted by Saint Louis University on February 13, 1909. On May 1, 1909, running "against a cold head wind", he finished over six minutes ahead of Alexander Thibeau to win the Missouri Athletic Club's All-Western Marathon in a time of 2:49:10.4. Erxleben finished five seconds behind L. J. Pillivant as the runner-up in the sixth edition of the same race on May 14 of the following year, but beat Joseph Forshaw to win the Missouri AC event for a second time in 1911.

In March 1912, Erxleben was one of "twenty of the best distance runners in the middle west" scheduled to participate in a 20-mile indoor marathon at Riverview Rink in Chicago, Illinois.

== 1912 Summer Olympics ==
For the third time in four years, Erxleben again won the 25-mile Missouri Athletic Club marathon in St. Louis on May 4, 1912, to earn a spot on the United States Olympic Team. Posting a time of 2:36:30, he finished ahead of runner-up Forshaw with Sidney Hatch in third. (Note: The Association of Road Racing Statisticians notes that Erxleben's performance in St. Louis on May 4, 1912 was the seventh fastest over 40km or 25 miles that year.) According to The Washington Times, Erxleben was also selected by the United States Olympic Committee to represent the team in the 10,000 meters flat, but there is no record in the official report of the 1912 games that he participated in the event.

Conditions for the marathon at the 1912 Summer Olympics run on July 14, 1912, have been described as "very hot" and even "horrific", with only half of the 68 starters finishing the race. Late in the race, seven Americans ran in the top twelve positions, including Erxleben in ninth, resulting in one report to suggest that they may have acclimatized better to the heat than the Northern European competitors. Erxleben finished in eighth place, the fourth American, with a time of 2:45:47.2. He was one of 42 American Olympians who returned to New York aboard the Red Star Line ocean liner Vaderland on July 31, 1912.
