= Dušan Milošević =

Serbian athlete

Personal information
- Born: June 1, 1894
- Died: May 19, 1967 (aged 72)

Sport
- Sport: Football; Sprinting; Swimming

Dušan Milošević (Serbian Cyrillic: Душан Милошевић; 1 June 1894 – 19 May 1967) was a Serbian multi-sport athlete and Olympian.

He competed as one of two athletes from Serbia at the 1912 Summer Olympics, the other one being Dragutin Tomašević.

In addition to representing the Kingdom of Serbia internationally in track and field and swimming, Milošević was also one of the founders of BSK and one of its first footballers.
