= Ivar Lundberg =

Swedish long-distance runner

Personal information
- Nationality: Swedish
- Born: 11 November 1878 Stockholm, Sweden
- Died: 31 July 1952 (aged 73) Stockholm, Sweden

Sport
- Sport: Long-distance running
- Event: Marathon

Ivar Lundberg (11 November 1878 – 31 July 1952) was a Swedish long-distance runner. He competed in the marathon at the 1912 Summer Olympics.
