= Hjalmar Dahlberg =

Swedish long-distance runner

Personal information
- Nationality: Swedish
- Born: 4 November 1886 Stockholm, Sweden
- Died: 5 March 1962 (aged 75) Stockholm, Sweden

Sport
- Sport: Long-distance running
- Event: Marathon

Hjalmar Dahlberg (4 November 1886 – 5 March 1962) was a Swedish long-distance runner. He competed in the marathon at the 1912 Summer Olympics.
