= Carl Nilsson (runner) =

Swedish long-distance runner

Personal information
- Nationality: Swedish
- Born: 18 May 1888 Stockholm, Sweden
- Died: 23 June 1915 (aged 27) Gothenburg, Sweden

Sport
- Sport: Long-distance running
- Event: Marathon

Carl Nilsson (18 May 1888 – 23 June 1915) was a Swedish long-distance runner. He competed in the marathon at the 1912 Summer Olympics. He finished 32nd in a time of 3:26:56.

Nilsson represented Djurgårdens IF.

== Biography ==
Carl Nilsson, nicknamed “Calle”, was a Swedish long-distance runner best known for competing in the marathon at the 1912 Summer Olympics, In 1911, he achieved some local success by winning a medal in the Swedish Championships in cross-country running (8 kilometers as part of a team).
