= Arthur Townsend (athlete) =

British long-distance runner

Arthur Henry Townsend
Personal information
- Nationality: British
- Born: 7 April 1883 Clacton-on-Sea, Essex, England
- Died: 10 May 1937 (aged 54) Clacton-on-Sea, Essex, England

Sport
- Sport: Long-distance running
- Event: Marathon

Arthur Henry Townsend (7 April 1883 – 10 May 1937) was a British long-distance runner. He competed in the marathon at the 1912 Summer Olympics, where he finished 19th.
