= Carl Andersson (athlete) =

Swedish long-distance runner

Personal information
- Nationality: Swedish
- Born: 3 January 1877 Umeå, Sweden
- Died: 4 January 1956 (aged 79) Umeå, Sweden

Sport
- Sport: Long-distance running
- Event: Marathon

Carl Andersson (3 January 1877 – 4 January 1956) was a Swedish long-distance runner. He competed in the marathon at the 1912 Summer Olympics.
