= Ödön Kárpáti =

Hungarian long-distance runner

Personal information
- Nationality: Hungarian
- Born: 2 January 1892 Budapest, Hungary
- Died: November 1914 (aged 22)

Sport
- Sport: Long-distance running
- Event: Marathon

Ödön Kárpáti (2 January 1892 – November 1914) was a Hungarian long-distance runner. He competed in the marathon at the 1912 Summer Olympics.

He started his athletic career at FTC and moved to BAK along with several of his teammates. Kárpáti was a long-distance runner, mostly in the 10K and marathon. At the 1912 Stockholm Olympics, he placed 31st in the marathon. In 1913, Kárpáti was suspended until 1914 due to his unacceptable behavior against the representative of the MASZ (Hungarian Athletic Association). Despite this ban, Kárpáti continued to compete and was banned from racing for life, but subsequently, it was modified until July 1915. Unfortunately, Kárpáti could not take advantage of this opportunity. When World War I broke out, he was immediately recruited and killed in action during World War I. on the Southern front in November 1914.

Personal Best: Mar – 3-25:22 (1912).
