= Axel Simonsen =

Norwegian long-distance runner

Personal information
- Nationality: Norwegian
- Born: 11 March 1887 Oslo, Norway
- Died: 3 April 1938 (aged 51) Oslo, Norway

Sport
- Sport: Long-distance running
- Event: Marathon

Axel Simonsen (11 March 1887 – 3 April 1938) was a Norwegian long distance runner, born in Oslo. He represented the club IK Tjalve. He participated in marathon at the 1912 Summer Olympics in Stockholm.
