= Athletics at the 1912 Summer Olympics – Men's marathon =

Men's marathon at the Games of the V Olympiad
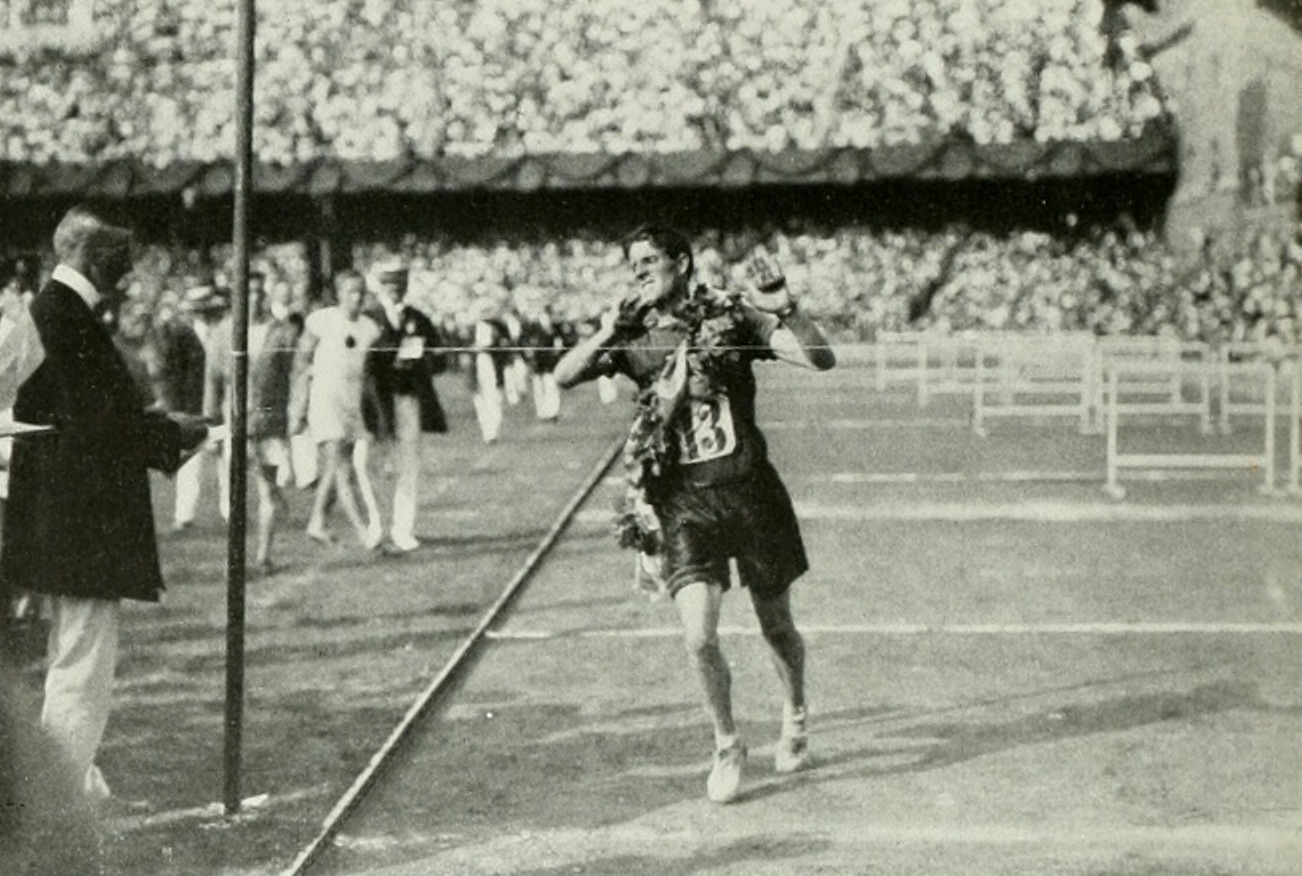
- Ken McArthur winning the race.
- Venue: Stockholms Olympiastadion, Stockholm
- Dates: July 14, 1912
- Competitors: 68 from 19 nations
- Winning time: 2:36:54.8 OR

Medalists
1st place, gold medalist(s)		Ken McArthur; South Africa
2nd place, silver medalist(s)		Christian Gitsham; South Africa
3rd place, bronze medalist(s)		Gaston Strobino; United States

Official Video

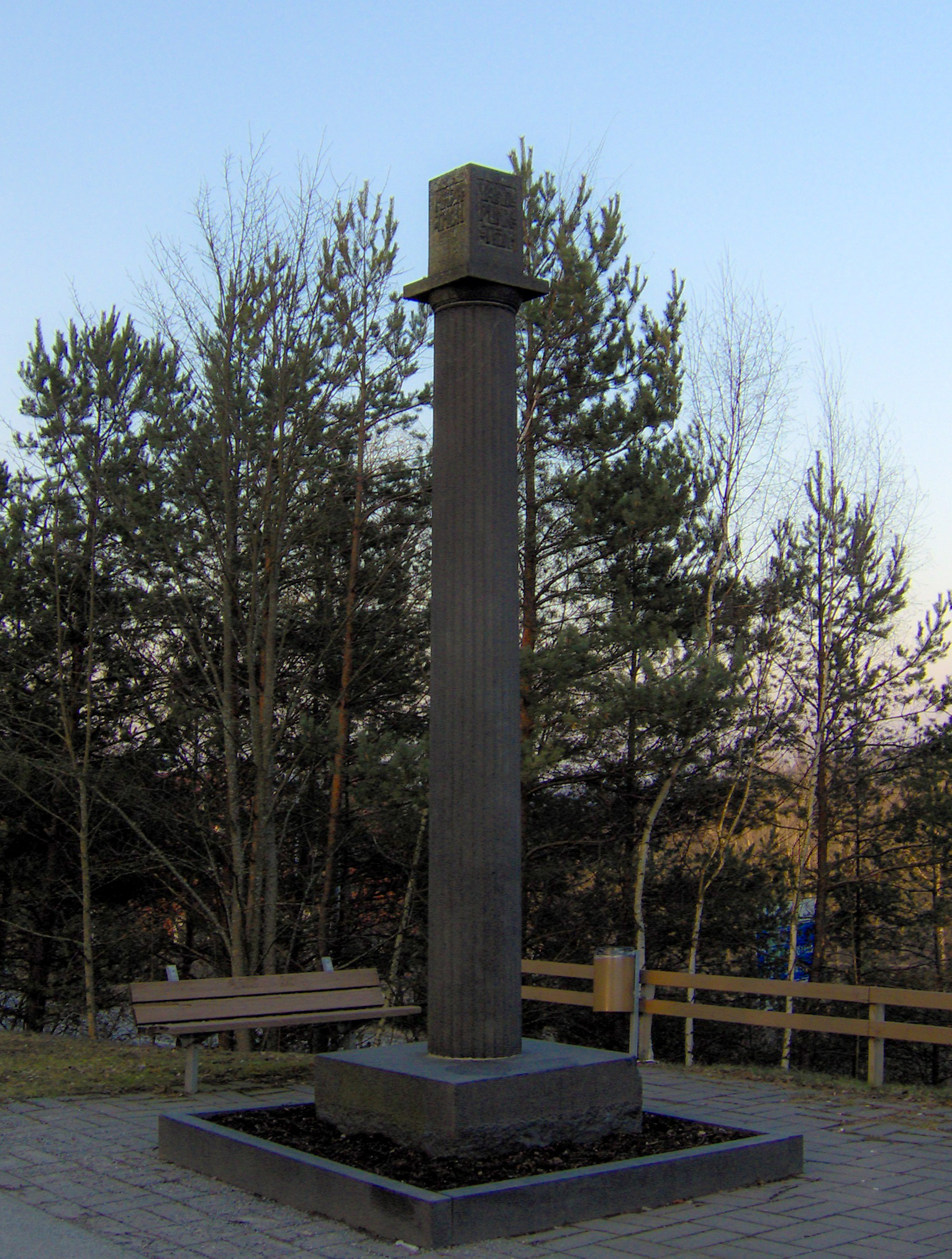
The turning-point of the marathon

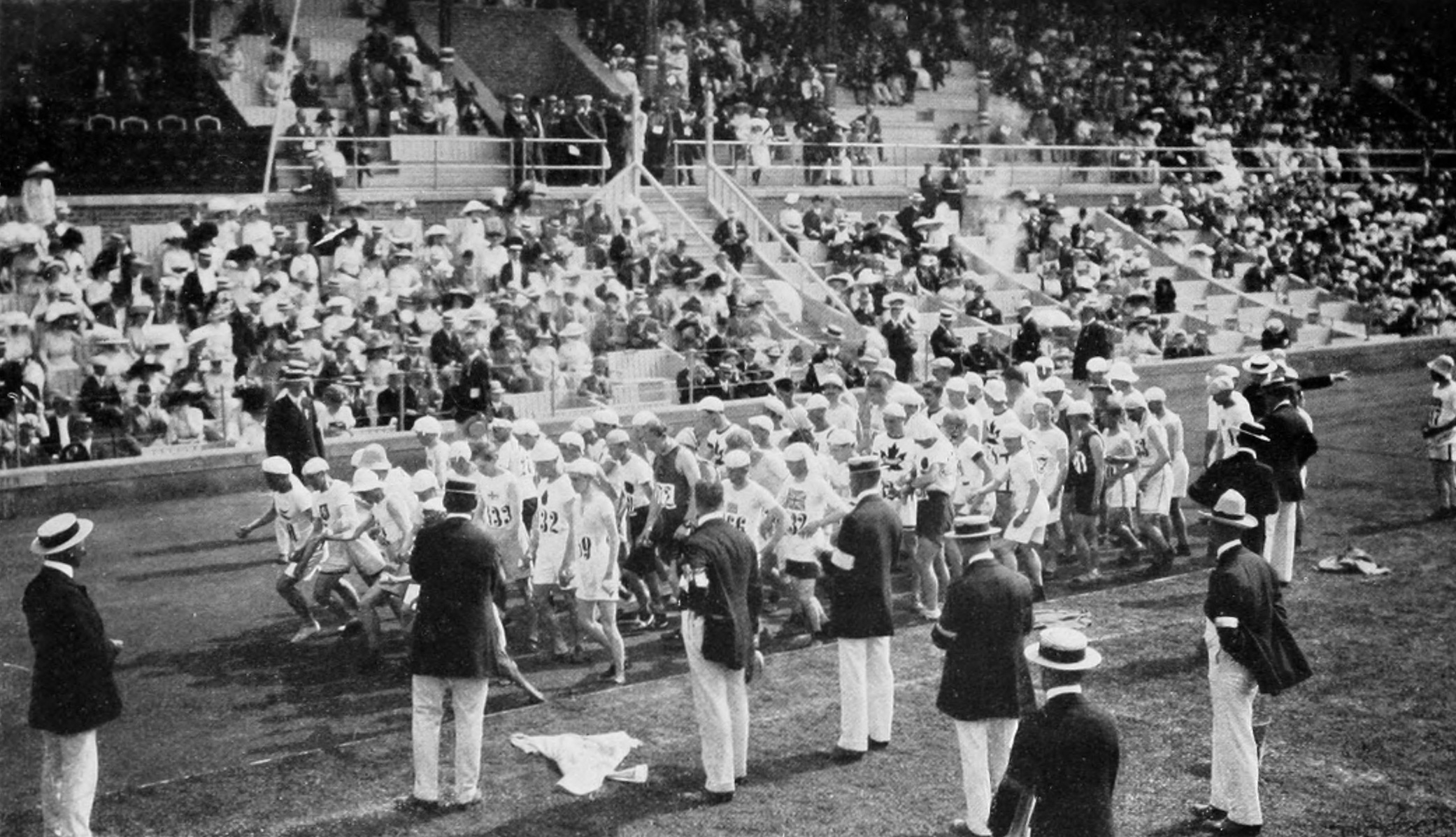
The start

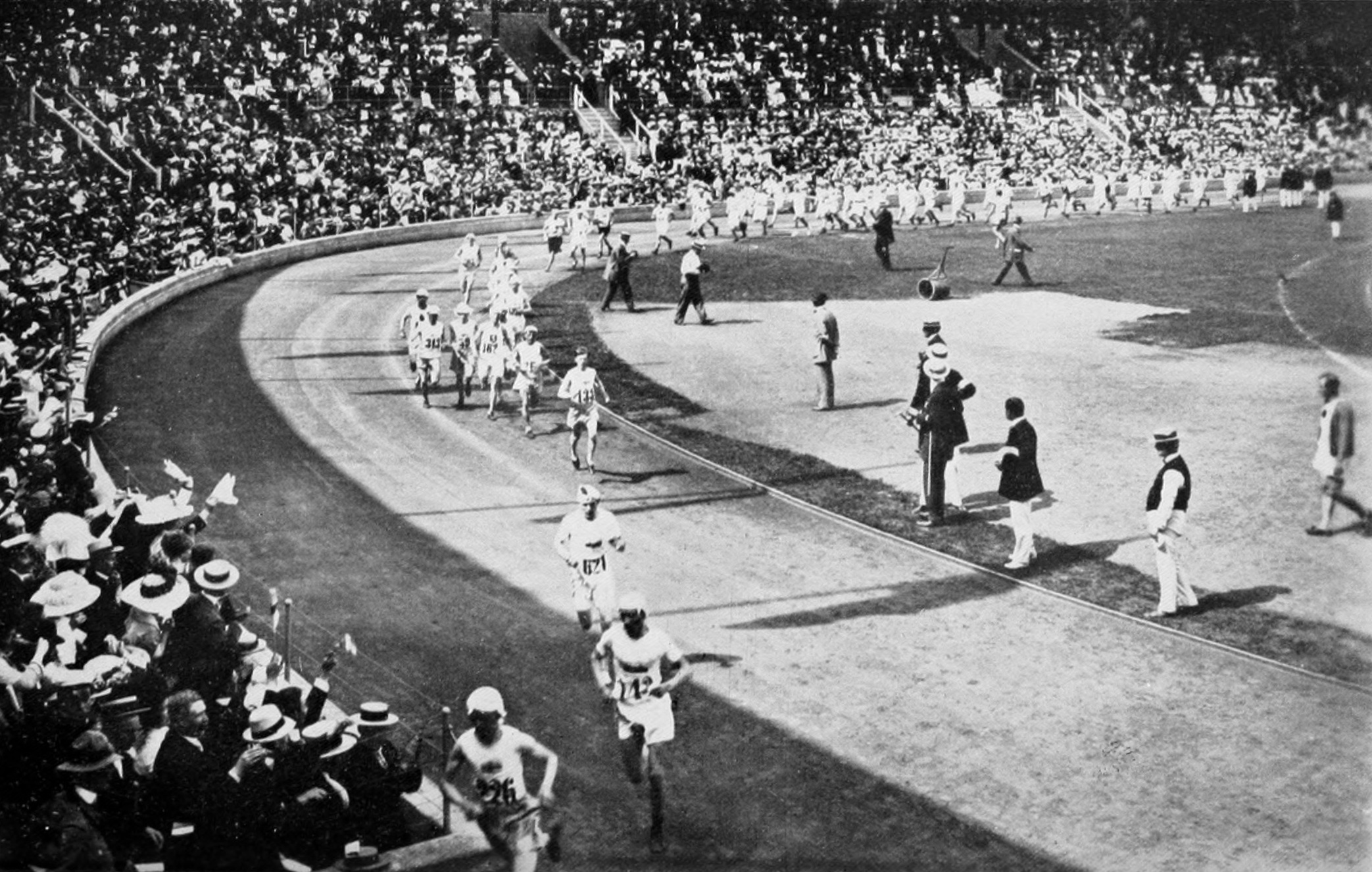
The runners leaving the stadium

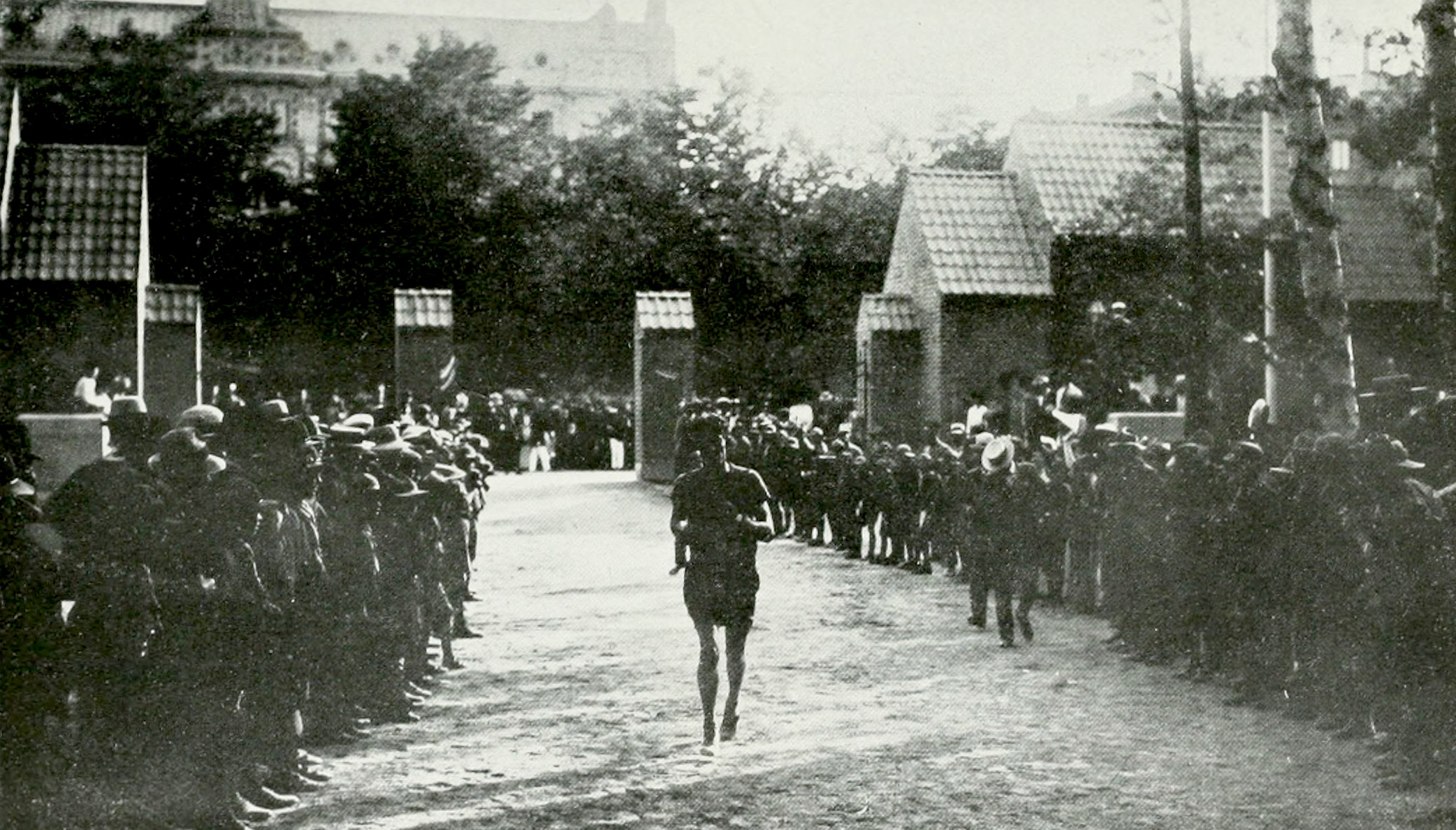
Ken McArthur at the entrance of the stadium

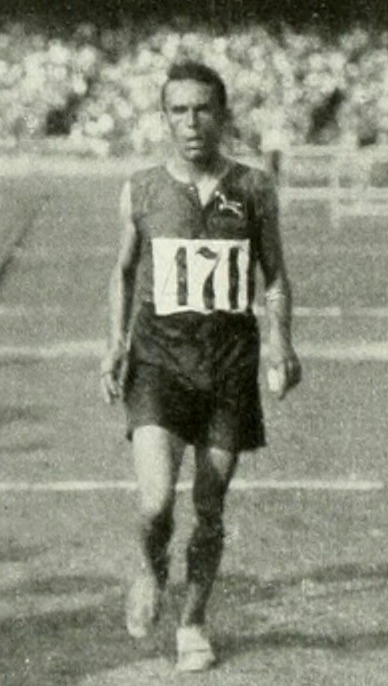
Christian Gitsham finishing in second place

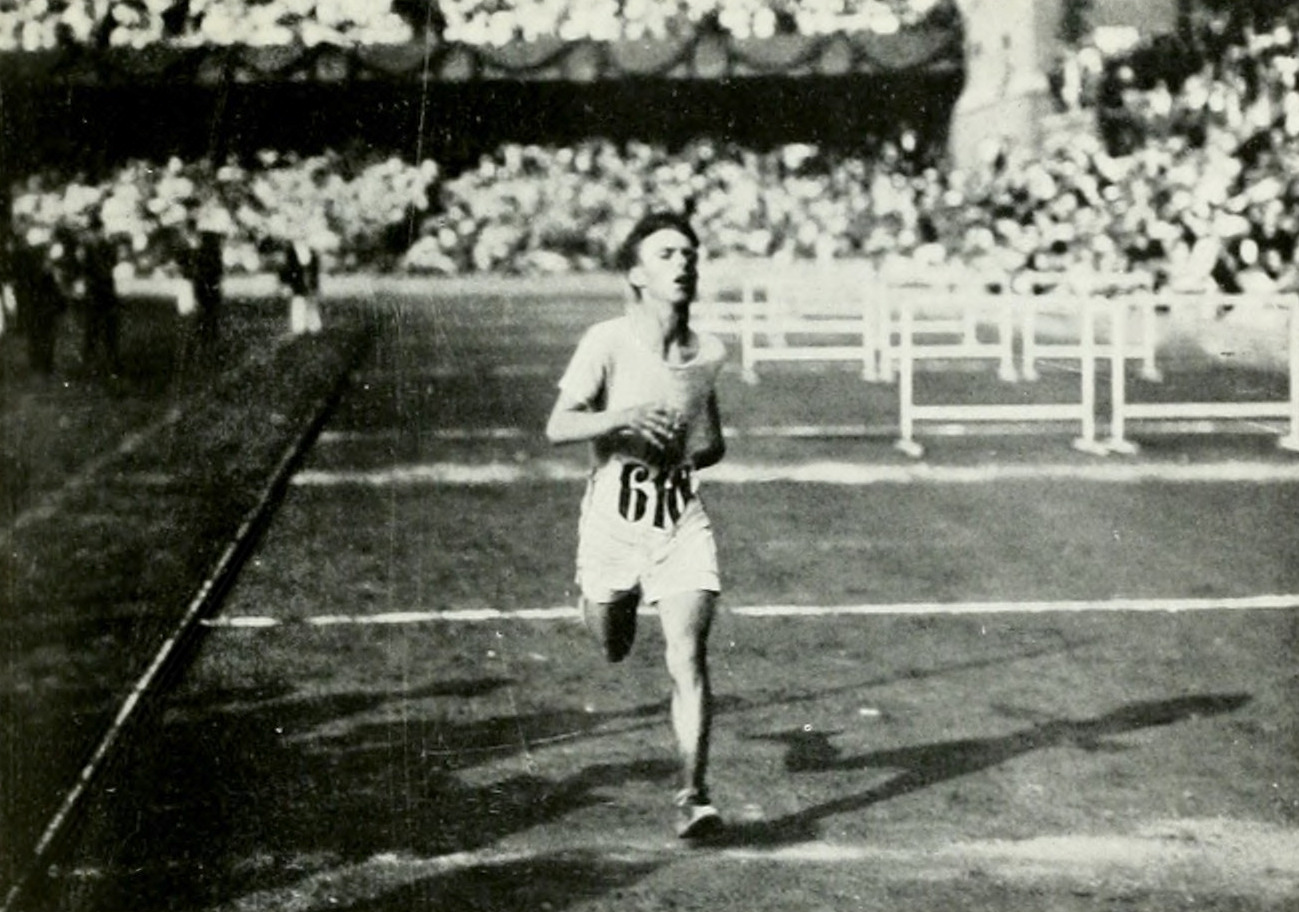
Gaston Strobino finishing in third place

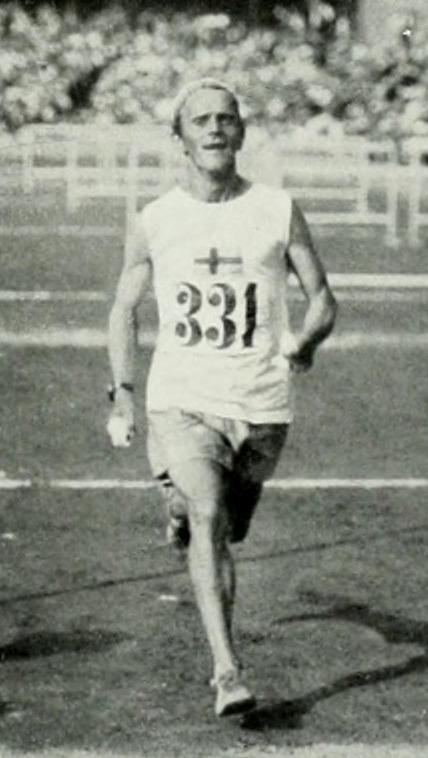
Sigfrid Jacobsson finishing in sixth place

The men's marathon was a track and field athletics event held as part of the athletics at the 1912 Summer Olympics programme. The distance used was 40.2 kilometres, nearly 2 full kilometres shorter than that used in 1908 and since 1924. The competition was held on Sunday, July 14, 1912. 95 runners entered, but only 68 runners (from 19 nations) competed. NOCs could enter up to 12 athletes. With conditions described as "very hot", only 36 of the 68 competitors finished. The event was won by Ken McArthur of South Africa, the nation's first Olympic marathon victory.

This event also saw the first Olympic fatality, as Francisco Lázaro collapsed during the race, and died in hospital the next morning, while another runner, Shizo Kanakuri, went missing: Kanakuri had dropped out of the race due to exhaustion and dehydration and returned home to Japan without notifying race officials. He was taken care of by a local family and eventually returned to finish the Marathon on scene in 1967, at age 77. The descendants of the Swedish family were invited by a Japanese TV team to the stadium in 2012 to commemorate the incident, cited in Sweden as the "missing Japanese" and "the longest Marathon ever".

== Background ==
This was the fifth appearance of the event, which is one of 12 athletics events to have been held at every Summer Olympics. The field was strong. Sweden and the United States each entered full 12-man teams; the American team included 1911 Boston Marathon winner Clarence DeMar, 1912 Boston winner Michael J. Ryan, and 1908 Olympic bronze medalist Joseph Forshaw. Great Britain had 1909 Polytechnic winner Henry Barrett and 6 of the 8 finishers in the 1912 Polytechnic. Canada sent the winner of that 1912 Polytechnic, James Corkery. South Africa had the runner-up, Christian Gitsham, as well as Ken McArthur, who had won three marathons in South Africa.

Japan, Norway, Portugal, and Serbia each made their first appearance in Olympic marathons. The United States made its fifth appearance, the only nation to have competed in each Olympic marathon to that point.

== Competition format ==
As all marathons, the competition was a single race. The course for the race was 40.2 kilometres long, which was more akin to the 1896 (40 km), 1900 (40.26 km), and 1904 (40 km) courses than the previous 1908 course (42.195 km) which would become standard.

It was "the first time the Olympic marathon was conducted as an out-and-back race." The course started at the stadium, went to the town of Sollentuna, and came back.

== Records ==
These were the standing world and Olympic records (in hours) prior to the 1912 Summer Olympics.

World record	Thure Johansson (SWE)	2:51:23.6	Stockholm, Sweden	31 August 1909
Olympic record	Johnny Hayes (USA)	2:55:18.4	London, United Kingdom	24 July 1908

The distance was nearly two kilometres shorter; nevertheless, Ken McArthur's winning time is registered as an Olympic record.

== Schedule ==
Date	Time	Round
Sunday, 14 July 1912	13:48	Final

== Results ==
Rank	Athlete	Nation	Time	Notes
1st place, gold medalist(s)	Ken McArthur	South Africa	2:36:54.8	OR
2nd place, silver medalist(s)	Christian Gitsham	South Africa	2:37:52.0	
3rd place, bronze medalist(s)	Gaston Strobino	United States	2:38:42.4	
4	Andrew Sockalexis	United States	2:42:07.9	
5	James Duffy	Canada	2:42:18.8	
6	Sigfrid Jacobsson	Sweden	2:43:24.9	
7	John Gallagher	United States	2:44:19.4	
8	Joseph Erxleben	United States	2:45:47.2	
9	Richard Piggott	United States	2:46:40.7	
10	Joseph Forshaw	United States	2:49:49.4	
11	Édouard Fabre	Canada	2:50:36.2	
12	Clarence DeMar	United States	2:50:46.6	
13	Renon Boissière	France	2:51:06.6	
14	Henry Green	Great Britain	2:52:11.4	
15	William Forsyth	Canada	2:52:23.0	
16	Lewis Tewanima	United States	2:52:41.4	
17	Harry Smith	United States	2:52:53.8	
18	Thomas Lilley	United States	2:59:35.4	
19	Arthur Townsend	Great Britain	3:00:05.0	
20	Felix Kwieton	Austria	3:00:48.0	
21	Frederick Lord	Great Britain	3:01:39.2	
22	Jacob Westberg	Sweden	3:02:05.2	
23	Axel Simonsen	Norway	3:04:59.4	
24	Carl Andersson	Sweden	3:06:13.0	
25	Edgar Lloyd	Great Britain	3:09:25.0	
26	Iraklis Sakellaropoulos	Greece	3:11:37.0	
27	Hjalmar Dahlberg	Sweden	3:13:32.2	
28	Ivar Lundberg	Sweden	3:16:35.2	
29	Johannes Christensen	Denmark	3:21:57.4	
30	Olaf Lodal	Denmark	3:21:57.6	
31	Ödön Kárpáti	Hungary	3:25:21.6	
32	Carl Nilsson	Sweden	3:26:56.4	
33	Emmerich Rath	Austria	3:27:03.8	
34	Otto Osen	Norway	3:36:35.2	
35	Elmar Reimann	Russia	Unknown	
36	Shizo Kanakuri	Japan	DNF	Unofficial time 54:08:06:05:32:20.3 "Finished" 54 years later

There were 32 more men who started the race but did not finish.

== Possible timing error ==
Some historical sources, including the official report of the 1912 Olympics, list the 5 km checkpoint at Stocksund as being passed by the lead runners at 2:17:20 PM. Given the official race start at 1:48:00 PM, this implies a first 5 km split of 29 minutes and 20 seconds—an unusually slow pace for elite marathoners.

However, the same sources list the 15 km checkpoint being passed by Hannes Kolehmainen at 2:42:19 PM. This means the preceding 10 km (from 5 km to 15 km) would have been covered in just under 25 minutes—an implausibly fast segment even by modern standards, and faster than world record pace.

Olympic marathon historian David E. Martin highlighted this discrepancy in *The Olympic Marathon*, identifying the 5 km timing as likely erroneous. The LA84 Foundation has also acknowledged this inconsistency based on archival review.
