= Ken McArthur =

South African long-distance runner (1881–1960)

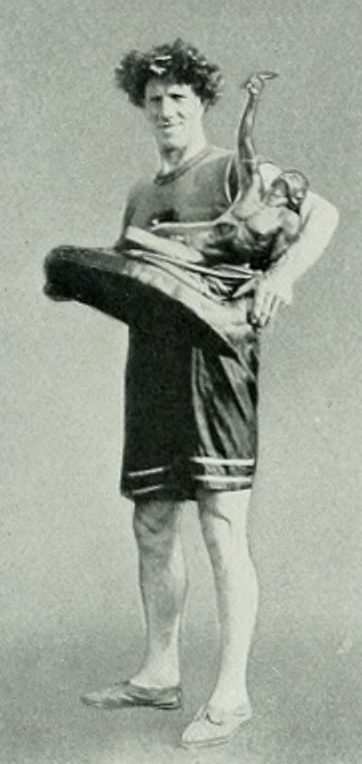
- Kenneth McArthur at the 1912 Olympics

Personal information
- Born: 10 February 1881 Dervock, County Antrim, Ireland
- Died: 13 June 1960 (aged 79) Potchefstroom, South Africa
- Height: 1.88 m (6 ft 2 in)
- Weight: 77 kg (170 lb)

Sport
- Sport: Long-distance running
Medal record
Representing South Africa
Olympic Games
Gold medal – first place	1912 Stockholm	Marathon

Kennedy Kane McArthur (10 February 1881 – 13 June 1960) is most noted as a track and field athlete and winner of the marathon at the 1912 Summer Olympics.

== Biography ==
Born in Dervock, County Antrim, Ireland, McArthur was recognised as a promising athlete as a teenager, but he didn't pursue an athletics career until after emigrating to South Africa in 1901 at the age of 20.

After joining the Johannesburg Police Force in 1906, McArthur begun to take athletics seriously. Soon he had won the Transvaal half and one mile championships, the five mile track championship and also two national cross country championships.

McArthur ran his first marathon late in the 1908 season, and surprisingly beat the Olympic silver medalist Charles Hefferon. He also won the national one and ten mile championships.

The Stockholm Olympic marathon took place in sweltering heat. Representing South Africa in the event, McArthur and his teammate Christian Gitsham ran together and soon took the lead. Confident of victory, Gitsham stopped for water, expecting his colleague to join him, as agreed. Instead McArthur ran on, stretching his lead and taking him to certain victory over Gitsham by 58 seconds.

In the next season, McArthur injured his foot in an accident and was forced to retire from athletics. He ran six marathon races (including the Olympic marathon) throughout his career and never lost one.
