= Joseph Forshaw (runner) =

American long-distance runner

Olympic medal record

Men's athletics

Representing the United States
Bronze medal – third place	1908 London	Marathon

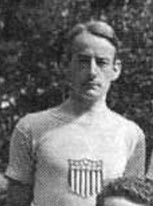
Portrait of Joseph Forshaw Jr.

Joseph Forshaw Jr. (May 13, 1881 – November 26, 1964) was an American athlete who competed mainly in the marathon.

== Career ==
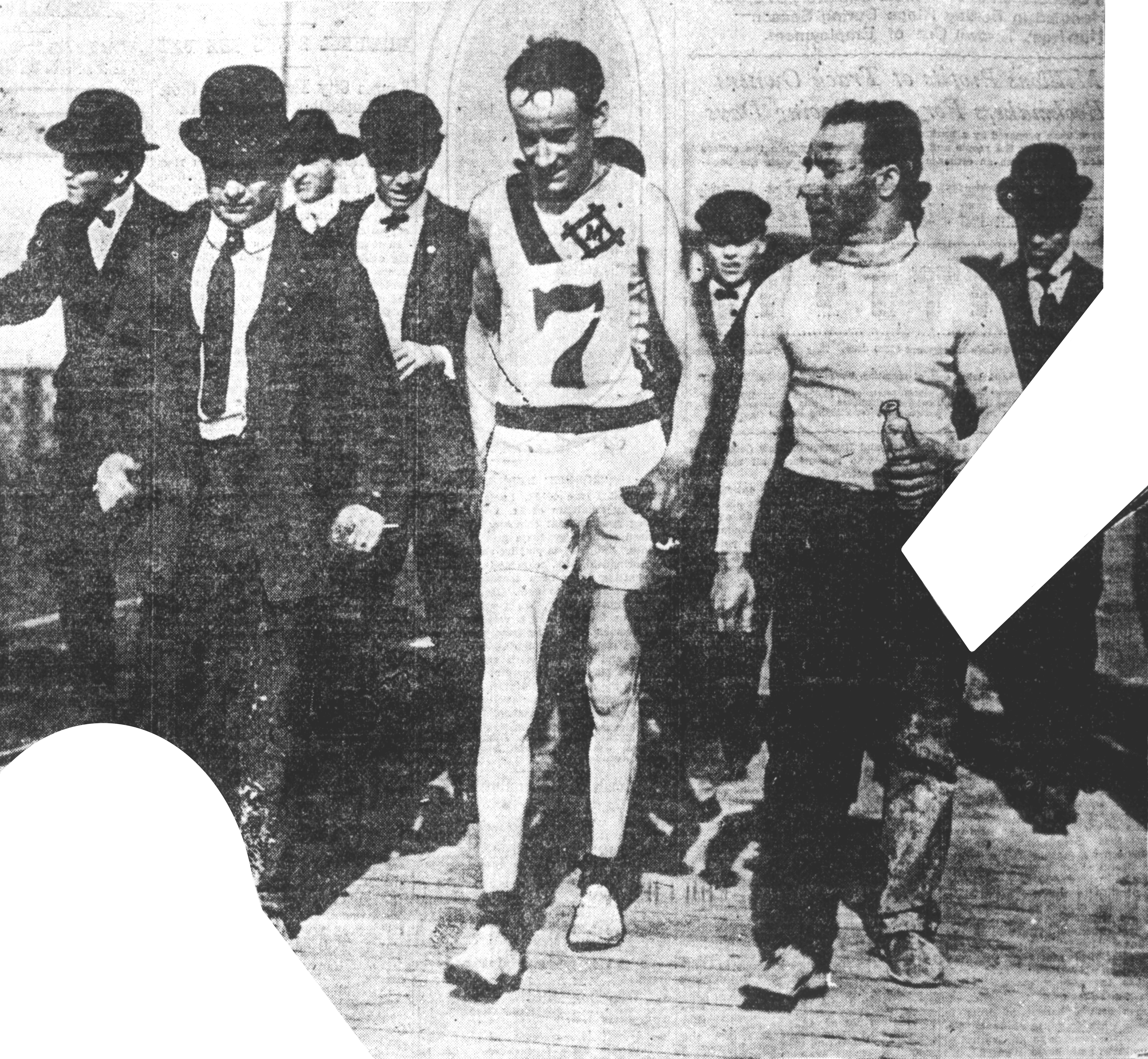
Forshaw after winning the 1905 All-Western Marathon

Forshaw entered in the Missouri Athletic Club's All-Western Marathon six times between 1905 and 1912. On May 6, 1905, Forshaw beat Sidney Hatch and Felix Carvajal to win for the M. A. C. in a time of 3:15:58. In addition to winning the inaugural event, he came in fourth two times and second thrice. On May 2, 1908, Forshaw finished next to Hatch in 2:30:01, his best time in the event, also competing for the Missouri Athletic Club. The second place after Joseph Erxleben on May 4, 1912 earned him a spot on the United States Olympic Team.

Forshaw ran the marathon in three Olympic Games. At the 1906 Intercalated Games in Athens, he finished in twelfth place. He competed for the United States in the 1908 Summer Olympics held in London, Great Britain, where he won the bronze medal in the marathon. And at the 1912 Summer Olympics in Stockholm, he was 10th in the event.

In March, 1912, Forshaw was one of "twenty of the best distance runners in the middle west" scheduled to participate in a 20-mile indoor marathon at Riverview Rink in Chicago, Illinois. He reportedly finished every race in which he ever ran.

After retiring from distance running he twice served as President of the Western Amateur Athletic Union.

Seventeen years after his death, his grandson married the daughter of Phyllis Schlafly.
