= Christian Gitsham =

South African long-distance runner

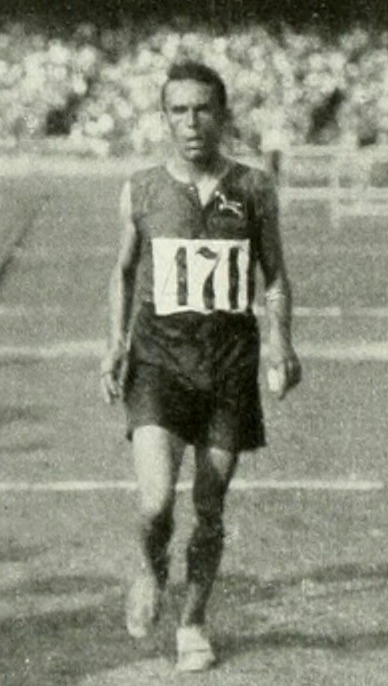
- Christian Gitsham at the 1912 Olympics

Personal information
- Born: 15 October 1888 Pietermaritzburg, Colony of Natal
- Died: 16 June 1956 (aged 67)

Sport
- Sport: Long-distance running
Medal record
Representing South Africa
Olympic Games
Silver medal – second place	1912 Stockholm	Marathon

Christopher William Gitsham (15 October 1888 – 16 June 1956) was a South African athlete, who mainly competed in the men's marathon.

Gitsham competed for South Africa at the 1912 Summer Olympics held in Stockholm, Sweden where he won the silver medal in the men's marathon event. He also competed in the marathon at the 1920 Summer Olympics, but did not finish.
