= Petrovac, Serbia =

Petrovac Петровац (Serbian) Petrovac na Mlavi
- Town and municipality
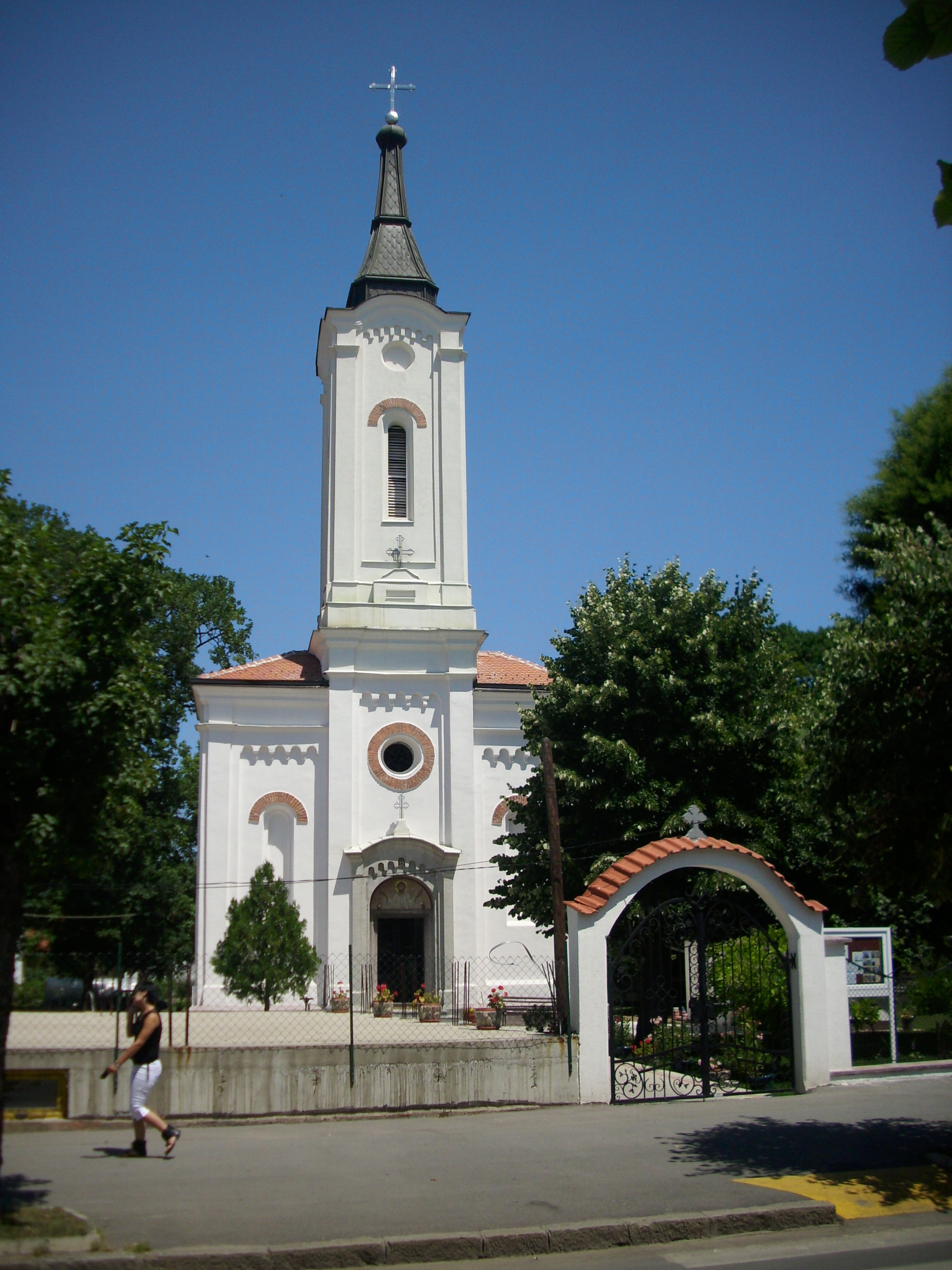
- Church in Petrovac

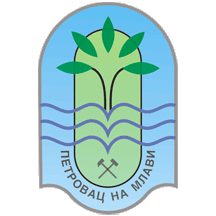
- Coat of arms

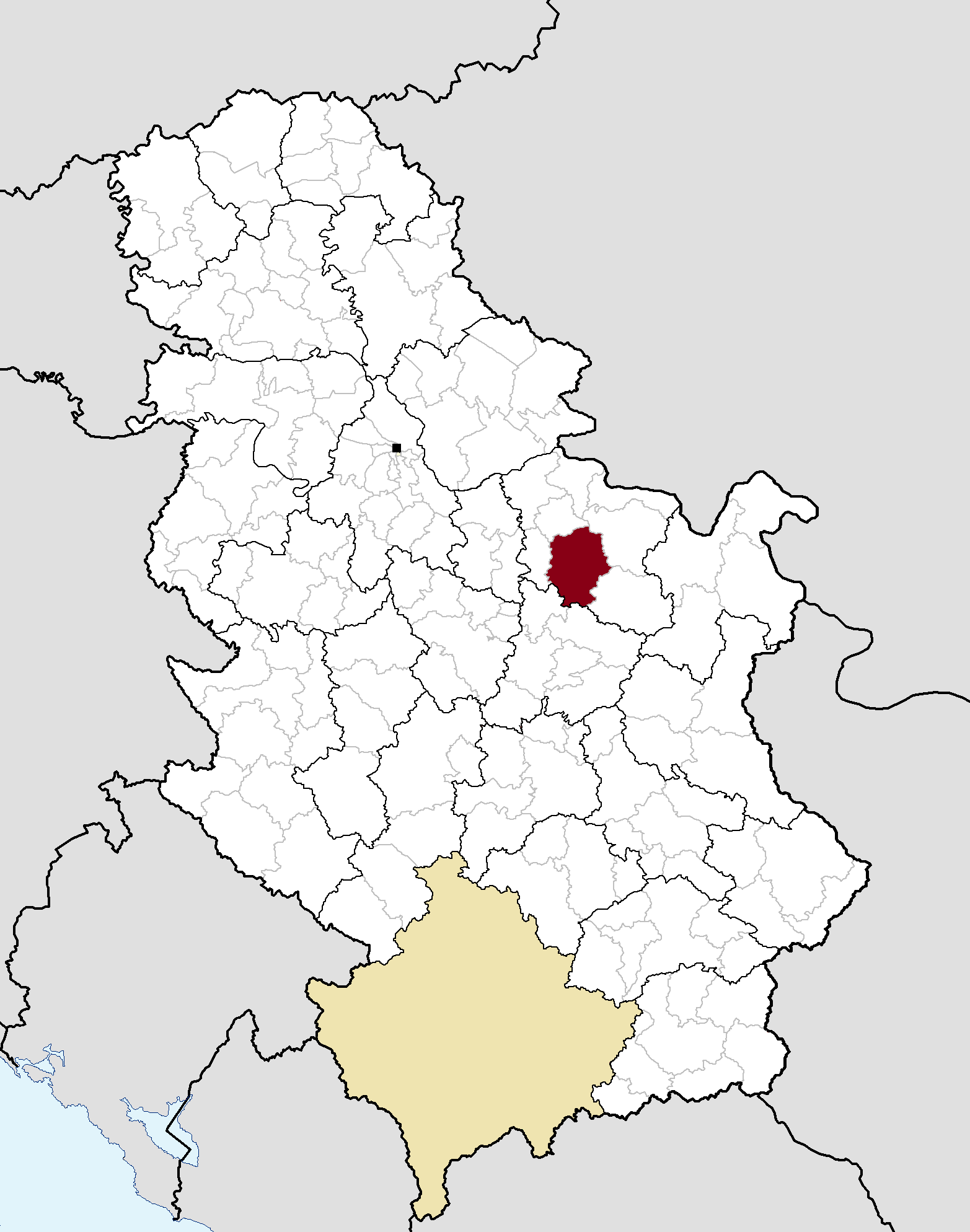
- Location of the municipality of Petrovac within Serbia
- Interactive map of Petrovac
- Coordinates: 44°22′42″N 21°25′10″E
- Country: Serbia
- Region: Southern and Eastern Serbia
- District: Braničevo
- Settlements: 34

Government
  - Mayor: Duško Nedinić (SNS)

Area
  - Municipality: 655 km^{2} (253 sq mi)
- Elevation: 127 m (417 ft)

Population (2022 census)
  - Town: 6,958
  - Municipality: 25,900
- Time zone: UTC+1 (CET)
  - Summer (DST): UTC+2 (CEST)
- Postal code: 12300
- Area code: +381(0)12
- Car plates: PT
- Website: www.petrovacnamlavi.rs

Petrovac (Serbian Cyrillic: Петровац), also known as Petrovac na Mlavi (Serbian Cyrillic: Петровац на Млави, "Petrovac-upon-Mlava"; Romanian: Piatra Mlavei) is a town and municipality located in the Braničevo District of eastern Serbia. In 2022, the population of the town is 6,958, while the population of the municipality is 25,900.

== History ==
From 1929 to 1941, Petrovac was part of the Morava Banovina of the Kingdom of Yugoslavia.

== Demographics ==
Historical population
Year	Pop.	±% p.a.
1948	50,430	—
1953	51,560	+0.44%
1961	51,613	+0.01%
1971	50,433	−0.23%
1981	48,608	−0.37%
1991	46,414	−0.46%
2002	34,511	−2.66%
2011	31,259	−1.09%
2022	25,900	−1.70%

== Economy ==
The following table gives a preview of total number of registered people employed in legal entities per their core activity (as of 2018):

Activity	Total
Agriculture, forestry and fishing	74
Mining and quarrying	28
Manufacturing	619
Electricity, gas, steam and air conditioning supply	56
Water supply; sewerage, waste management and remediation activities	101
Construction	223
Wholesale and retail trade, repair of motor vehicles and motorcycles	1,217
Transportation and storage	199
Accommodation and food services	329
Information and communication	62
Financial and insurance activities	40
Real estate activities	3
Professional, scientific and technical activities	176
Administrative and support service activities	77
Public administration and defense; compulsory social security	298
Education	370
Human health and social work activities	809
Arts, entertainment and recreation	91
Other service activities	134
Individual agricultural workers	2,142
Total	7,048

== Sports ==
Local football club FK Sloga 33 has played in Serbia's second tier.
