= Cycling at the 1908 Summer Olympics – Men's sprint =

Cycling at the Olympics

Men's sprint at the Games of the IV Olympiad
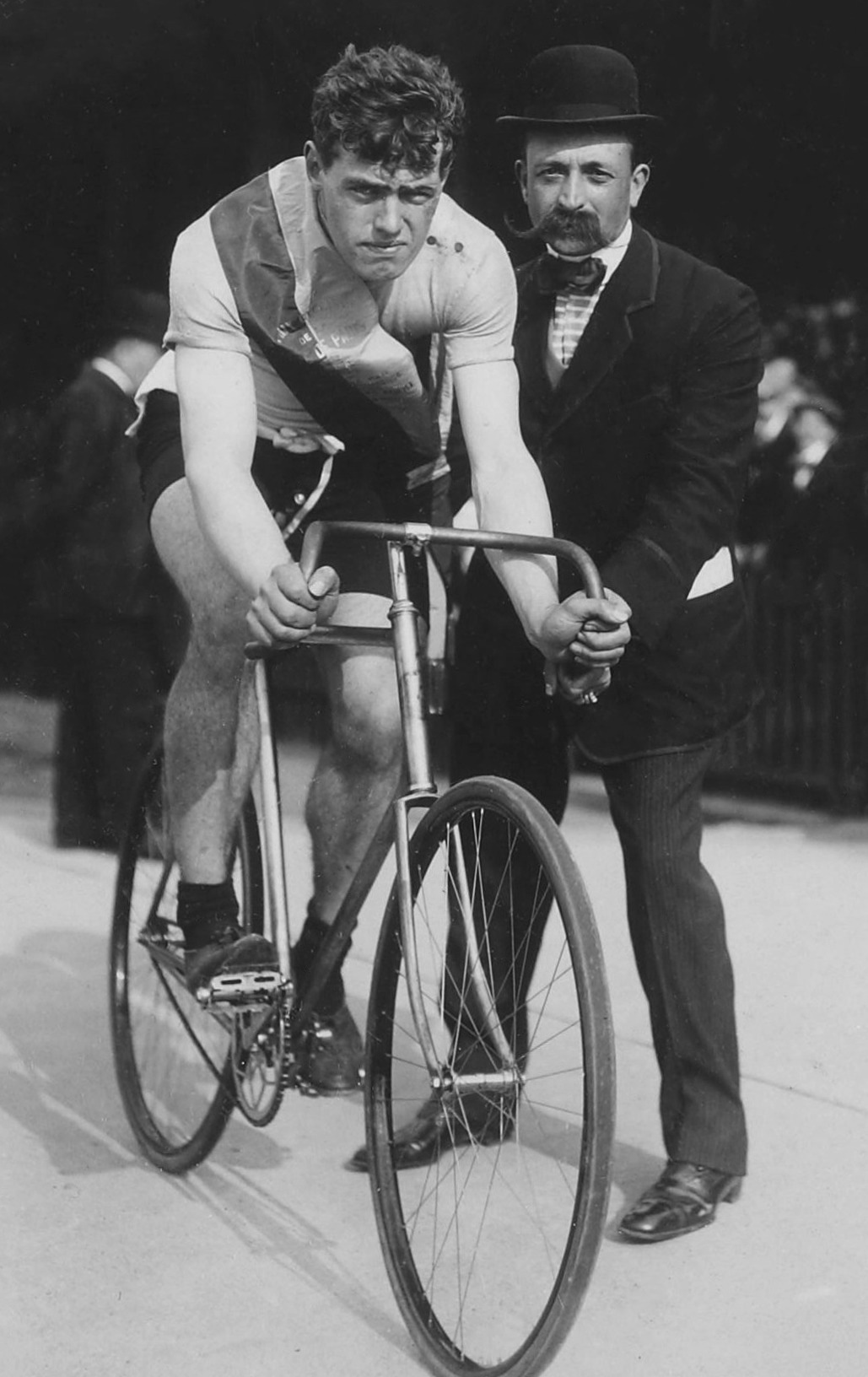
- Maurice Schilles
- Venue: White City Stadium
- Date: July 16, 1908
- Competitors: 42 from 10 nations

Medalists
1st place, gold medalist(s)		Not awarded
2nd place, silver medalist(s)		Not awarded
3rd place, bronze medalist(s)		Not awarded

The men's 1000 metre sprint was one of seven track cycling events on the Cycling at the 1908 Summer Olympics programme. Its distance was the second shortest of the individual event distances. Each nation could enter up to 12 cyclists.

== Background ==
This was the third appearance of the event, which has been held at every Summer Olympics except 1904 and 1912. None of the finalists from 1900 returned.

Canada, Great Britain, the Netherlands, South Africa, and Sweden each made their debut in the men's sprint. France and Germany made their third appearance, having competed in both previous editions of the event.

== Competition format ==
The 1000 metre sprint race consisted of approximately 1 2/3 laps of the 660 yard track. The time limit for the race was 1 minute and 45 seconds. The competition was conducted in three rounds (quarterfinals, semifinals, and a final). The quarterfinals featured 16 heats, with up to 4 cyclists each. The winning cyclist in each heat advanced to the semifinals, provided that the time limit was not exceeded. The semifinal round comprised 4 semifinals, each with 4 cyclists except that 2 were reduced to 3 cyclists because two of the heats had resulted in no winner under the time limit. Again, the winning cyclist in each semifinal advanced to the final.

== Records ==
The records for the sprint are 200 metre flying time trial records, kept for the qualifying round in later Games as well as for the finish of races.

World record	Unknown	Unknown^{*}	Unknown	Unknown
Olympic record	Albert Taillandier (FRA)	12.6	Paris, France	13 September 1900

^{*} World records were not tracked by the UCI until 1954.

The 200 metre sprint splits were not tracked for this Games, so no new records were set.

== Schedule ==
Date	Time	Round
Thursday, 16 July 1908	15:00; 16:45; 17:30	Quarterfinals; Semifinals; Final

== Results ==
=== Quarterfinals ===
==== Quarterfinal 1 ====
Johnson won by two lengths.

Rank	Cyclist	Nation	Time	Notes
1	Victor Johnson	Great Britain	1:33.8	Q
2	Gerard Bosch van Drakenstein	Netherlands	Unknown	
3	Guglielmo Malatesta	Italy	Unknown	

==== Quarterfinal 2 ====
Poulain was a wheel behind Venter.

Rank	Cyclist	Nation	Time	Notes
1	Floris Venter	South Africa	1:33.2	Q
2	André Poulain	France	Unknown	
3	Thomas Matthews	Great Britain	Unknown	

==== Quarterfinal 3 ====
Hansson was one length behind Schilles.

Rank	Cyclist	Nation	Time	Notes
1	Maurice Schilles	France	1:38.4	Q
2	Andrew Hansson	Sweden	Unknown	

==== Quarterfinal 4 ====
Flynn won by two lengths.

Rank	Cyclist	Nation	Time	Notes
1	Daniel Flynn	Great Britain	1:30.2	Q
2	Pierre Seginaud	France	Unknown	
3	Paul Schulze	Germany	Unknown	
4	Frederick McCarthy	Canada	Unknown	

==== Quarterfinal 5 ====
Nijland trailed Payne by a length and a half.

Rank	Cyclist	Nation	Time	Notes
1	Ernest Payne	Great Britain	1:32.0	Q
2	Dorus Nijland	Netherlands	Unknown	

==== Quarterfinal 6 ====
Rank	Cyclist	Nation	Time	Notes
—	Willie Maggie	Great Britain	Time limit exceeded	
—	Hermann Martens	Germany	Time limit exceeded	
—	Johannes van Spengen	Netherlands	Time limit exceeded	

==== Quarterfinal 7 ====
Neumer won by two lengths.

Rank	Cyclist	Nation	Time	Notes
1	Karl Neumer	Germany	1:33.2	Q
2	Richard Villepontoux	France	Unknown	
3	William Bailey	Great Britain	Unknown	

==== Quarterfinal 8 ====
Cameron won by two lengths.

Rank	Cyclist	Nation	Time	Notes
1	George Cameron	United States	1:29.4	Q
2	Philipus Freylinck	South Africa	Unknown	
3	Herbert Crowther	Great Britain	Unknown	
4	Gaston Dreyfus	France	Unknown	

==== Quarterfinal 9 ====
Morton was two and a half lengths behind Demangel.

Rank	Cyclist	Nation	Time	Notes
1	Émile Demangel	France	1:35.2	Q
2	William Morton	Canada	Unknown	

==== Quarterfinal 10 ====
Auffray was the only starter in the heat.

Rank	Cyclist	Nation	Time	Notes
1	André Auffray	France	1:23.6	Q

==== Quarterfinal 11 ====
Morisetti was the only starter in the heat.

Rank	Cyclist	Nation	Time	Notes
1	Guglielmo Morisetti	Italy	1:21.4	Q

==== Quarterfinal 12 ====
Marechal was one length behind Jones.

Rank	Cyclist	Nation	Time	Notes
1	Benjamin Jones	Great Britain	1:35.0	Q
2	Émile Marechal	France	Unknown	
3	Bruno Götze	Germany	Unknown	

==== Quarterfinal 13 ====
Summers was nearly two lengths behind Texier.

Rank	Cyclist	Nation	Time	Notes
1	Pierre Texier	France	1:31.0	Q
2	George Summers	Great Britain	Unknown	
3	Louis Weintz	United States	Unknown	

==== Quarterfinal 14 ====
Lavery won easily.

Rank	Cyclist	Nation	Time	Notes
1	Joe Lavery	Great Britain	1:41.0	Q
2	Antonie Gerrits	Netherlands	Unknown	

==== Quarterfinal 15 ====
Rank	Cyclist	Nation	Time	Notes
1	Clarence Kingsbury	Great Britain	1:27.4	Q
2	Gaston Delaplane	France	Unknown	

==== Quarterfinal 16 ====
Rank	Cyclist	Nation	Time	Notes
—	Georges Perrin	France	Time limit exceeded	
—	Frank Shore	South Africa	Time limit exceeded	

=== Semifinals ===
==== Semifinal 1 ====
Neumer was inches behind Johnson.

Rank	Cyclist	Nation	Time	Notes
1	Victor Johnson	Great Britain	1:27.4	Q
2	Karl Neumer	Germany	Unknown	
3	Floris Venter	South Africa	Unknown	
4	Pierre Texier	France	Unknown	

==== Semifinal 2 ====
Payne was over a length behind Schilles; placement of the three non-qualifiers is unclear.

Rank	Cyclist	Nation	Time	Notes
1	Maurice Schilles	France	1:38.8	Q
2–4	George Cameron	United States	Unknown	
2–4	Daniel Flynn	Great Britain	Unknown	
2–4	Ernest Payne	Great Britain	Unknown	

==== Semifinal 3 ====
Jones won by half a wheel.

Rank	Cyclist	Nation	Time	Notes
1	Benjamin Jones	Great Britain	1:40.8	Q
2	Émile Demangel	France	Unknown	
3	J. L. Lavery	Great Britain	Unknown	

==== Semifinal 4 ====
Morisetti was two lengths behind Kingsbury.

Rank	Cyclist	Nation	Time	Notes
1	Clarence Kingsbury	Great Britain	1:35.6	Q
2	Guglielmo Morisetti	Italy	Unknown	
3	André Auffray	France	Unknown	

=== Final ===
Johnson suffered a punctured wheel shortly after the start, and retired. The other three riders crawled around the track, jockeying for position. When the final sprint occurred on the last lap, Kingsbury also punctured a tyre when entering the main straight. Jones and Schilles raced to the finish line, with Schilles winning by a couple of inches. However the race took longer than the 1 minute 45 second time limit, and was declared void. Much to the surprise of spectators and the competitors, the National Cyclists Union refused to allow the race to be rerun. According to the Official Report, "the Frenchman apparently won by inches, but the Judge did not officially place the riders."

Rank	Cyclist	Nation	Time
–	Victor Johnson	Great Britain	NMR
–	Benjamin Jones	Great Britain	NMR
–	Clarence Kingsbury	Great Britain	NMR
–	Maurice Schilles	France	NMR

== Sources ==
- Cook, Theodore Andrea (1908). The Fourth Olympiad, Being the Official Report. London: British Olympic Association.
- De Wael, Herman. Herman's Full Olympians: "Cycling 1908". Accessed 7 April 2006. Available electronically at.
