= Cycling at the 1908 Summer Olympics – Men's 660 yards =

Cycling at the Olympics

Men's 660 yards at the Games of the IV Olympiad
- Venue: White City Stadium
- Dates: July 14–15, 1908
- Competitors: 48 from 9 nations

Medalists
1st place, gold medalist(s)		Victor Johnson	Great Britain
2nd place, silver medalist(s)		Émile Demangel	France
3rd place, bronze medalist(s)		Karl Neumer	Germany

The men's 660 yards was one of seven track cycling events on the Cycling at the 1908 Summer Olympics programme. It was the shortest of the events. The 1908 Games was the only time when the 660 yards event was part of the Olympic cycling program. Each nation could enter a maximum of 12 cyclists.

== Competition format ==
The 660 yards race was a sprint-style race that consisted of a single lap around the track. The time limit for the race was 1 minute, 10 seconds. The competition was conducted in three rounds (heats, semifinals, and a final). The first round featured 16 heats, with up to 4 cyclists each. The winning cyclist advanced to the semifinals, provided that the time limit was not exceeded. The semifinal round comprised 4 semifinals, each with 4 cyclists except that 1 was reduced to 3 cyclists because one of the heats had resulted in no winner under the time limit. Again, the winning cyclist in each semifinal advanced to the final.

== Results ==
=== First round ===
One cyclist from each of the 16 heats advanced to the semifinal round.

==== Heat 1 ====
Rank	Cyclist	Nation	Time	Notes
1	Benjamin Jones	Great Britain	59.0	Q
2	Dorus Nijland	Netherlands	Unknown	

==== Heat 2 ====
Rank	Cyclist	Nation	Time	Notes
1	William Bailey	Great Britain	50.8	Q
2	Frederick McCarthy	Canada	Unknown	
3	Pierre Seginaud	France	Unknown	

==== Heat 3 ====
Rank	Cyclist	Nation	Time	Notes
1	Clarence Kingsbury	Great Britain	57.4	Q
2	Rudolf Katzer	Germany	Unknown	
3	Georgius Damen	Netherlands	Unknown	

==== Heat 4 ====
Rank	Cyclist	Nation	Time	Notes
1	Victor Johnson	Great Britain	56.2	Q
2	Jules Patou	Belgium	Unknown	
3	Richard Villepontoux	France	Unknown	

==== Heat 5 ====
The fifth heat was voided due to the two cyclists both exceeding the time limit of 70 seconds.

Rank	Cyclist	Nation	Time	Notes
—	Maurice Schilles	France	No time	
—	Frank Shore	South Africa	No time	

==== Heat 6 ====
Rank	Cyclist	Nation	Time	Notes
1	Émile Demangel	France	59.8	Q
2	George Summers	Great Britain	Unknown	
3	Andrew Hansson	Sweden	Unknown	

==== Heat 7 ====
Rank	Cyclist	Nation	Time	Notes
1	Johannes van Spengen	Netherlands	58.2	Q
2	Hermann Martens	Germany	Unknown	
3	Joe Lavery	Great Britain	Unknown	

==== Heat 8 ====
Rank	Cyclist	Nation	Time	Notes
1	Walter Andrews	Canada	55.8	Q
2	Joseph Werbrouck	Belgium	Unknown	
3	Gaston Delaplane	France	Unknown	

==== Heat 9 ====
Rank	Cyclist	Nation	Time	Notes
1	Paul Texier	France	1:01.6	Q
2	Thomas Passmore	South Africa	Unknown	

==== Heat 10 ====
Rank	Cyclist	Nation	Time	Notes
1	Floris Venter	South Africa	1:03.2	Q
2	Georges Perrin	France	Unknown	
3	Bruno Götze	Germany	Unknown	

==== Heat 11 ====
Rank	Cyclist	Nation	Time	Notes
1	Karl Neumer	Germany	54.2	Q
2	Willie Magee	Great Britain	Unknown	
3	Émile Maréchal	France	Unknown	
4	Antonie Gerrits	Netherlands	Unknown	

==== Heat 12 ====
Rank	Cyclist	Nation	Time	Notes
1	Ernest Payne	Great Britain	57.2	Q
2	André Poulain	France	Unknown	
3	Jean van Benthem	Belgium	Unknown	

==== Heat 13 ====
Rank	Cyclist	Nation	Time	Notes
1	Daniel Flynn	Great Britain	55.0	Q
2	Gerard Bosch van Drakenstein	Netherlands	Unknown	
3	Paul Schulze	Germany	Unknown	

==== Heat 14 ====
Rank	Cyclist	Nation	Time	Notes
1	Lucien Renard	Belgium	55.2	Q
2	Gaston Dreyfus	France	Unknown	
3	William Morton	Canada	Unknown	
4	George Anderson	Great Britain	Unknown	

==== Heat 15 ====
Rank	Cyclist	Nation	Time	Notes
1	George Cameron	United States	1:05.2	Q
2	Léon Coeckelberg	Belgium	Unknown	

==== Heat 16 ====
Rank	Cyclist	Nation	Time	Notes
1	André Auffray	France	58.4	Q
2	Albert Denny	Great Britain	Unknown	
3	Philipus Freylinck	South Africa	Unknown	

=== Semifinals ===
The fastest cyclist in each of the 4 semifinals advanced to the final.

==== Semifinal 1 ====
Rank	Cyclist	Nation	Time	Notes
1	Victor Johnson	Great Britain	59.2	Q
2	Johannes van Spengen	Netherlands	Unknown	
3	Paul Texier	France	Unknown	
4	Walter Andrews	Canada	Unknown	

==== Semifinal 2 ====
Rank	Cyclist	Nation	Time	Notes
1	Émile Demangel	France	51.6	Q
2	Clarence Kingsbury	Great Britain	Unknown	
3	William Bailey	Great Britain	Unknown	
4	Floris Venter	South Africa	Unknown	

==== Semifinal 3 ====
Rank	Cyclist	Nation	Time	Notes
1	Daniel Flynn	Great Britain	54.8	Q
2	André Auffray	France	Unknown	
3	George Cameron	United States	Unknown	
4	Ernest Payne	Great Britain	Unknown	

==== Semifinal 4 ====
Rank	Cyclist	Nation	Time	Notes
1	Karl Neumer	Germany	1:05.6	Q
2	Lucien Renard	Belgium	Unknown	
3	Benjamin Jones	Great Britain	Unknown	

=== Final ===
Rank	Cyclist	Nation	Time
1st place, gold medalist(s)	Victor Johnson	Great Britain	51.2
2nd place, silver medalist(s)	Émile Demangel	France	Unknown
3rd place, bronze medalist(s)	Karl Neumer	Germany	Unknown
4	Daniel Flynn	Great Britain	Unknown

== Sources ==
- Cook, Theodore Andrea (1908). The Fourth Olympiad, Being the Official Report. London: British Olympic Association.
- De Wael, Herman. Herman's Full Olympians: "Cycling 1908". Accessed 7 April 2006. Available electronically at.
