= Cycling at the 1908 Summer Olympics – Men's 5000 metres =

Cycling at the Olympics

Men's 5000 metres at the Games of the IV Olympiad
- Venue: White City Stadium
- Dates: July 17–18, 1908
- Competitors: 42 from 9 nations

Medalists
1st place, gold medalist(s)		Benjamin Jones	Great Britain
2nd place, silver medalist(s)		Maurice Schilles	France
3rd place, bronze medalist(s)		André Auffray	France

The men's 5000 metres was one of seven track cycling events on the Cycling at the 1908 Summer Olympics programme. Its distance was the median of the individual event distances. Each nation could enter up to 12 cyclists.

== Competition format ==
The 5000 metres was a sprint-style race, though considerably longer than modern sprints. The time limit for the race was 9 minutes, 25 seconds. The competition was conducted in two rounds (semifinals and a final). The semifinal round comprised 7 semifinals, each with up to 9 cyclists. The winning cyclist in each semifinal advanced to the final, so long as the time limit was not exceeded.

== Results ==
=== Semifinals ===
The best cyclist in each of the 7 semifinals advanced to the final.

==== Semifinal 1 ====
Rank	Cyclist	Nation	Time	Notes
1	Johannes van Spengen	Netherlands	8:39.8	Q
2	Daniel Flynn	Great Britain	Unknown	
3	Guglielmo Malatesta	Italy	Unknown	
4	Pierre Seginaud	France	Unknown	
—	William Bailey	Great Britain	DNF	

==== Semifinal 2 ====
Demangel had finished first by inches, but was disqualified for fouling.

Rank	Cyclist	Nation	Time	Notes
1	Émile Marechal	France	9:01.4	Q
2	Frederick McCarthy	Canada	Unknown	
3	Antonie Gerrits	Netherlands	Unknown	
—	Ernest Payne	Great Britain	DNF	
—	Émile Demangel	France	DSQ	

==== Semifinal 3 ====
Rank	Cyclist	Nation	Time	Notes
1	André Auffray	France	8:56.8	Q
2	Hermann Martens	Germany	Unknown	
3	Philipus Freylinck	South Africa	Unknown	
4	Bruno Götze	Germany	Unknown	
5	William Morton	Canada	Unknown	

==== Semifinal 4 ====
Rank	Cyclist	Nation	Time	Notes
1	Gerard Bosch van Drakenstein	Netherlands	8:42.8	Q
2	Willie Magee	Great Britain	Unknown	
3	Pierre Texier	France	Unknown	
4	Thomas Passmore	South Africa	Unknown	
—	André Poulain	France	DNF	

==== Semifinal 5 ====
Rank	Cyclist	Nation	Time	Notes
1	Benjamin Jones	Great Britain	9:08.8	Q
2	Karl Neumer	Germany	Unknown	
3	Cesare Zanzottera	Italy	Unknown	
4-9	Georgius Damen	Netherlands	Unknown	
4-9	Gaston Delaplane	France	Unknown	
4-9	Max Götze	Germany	Unknown	
4-9	Joe Lavery	Great Britain	Unknown	
4-9	Frank Shore	South Africa	Unknown	
4-9	Richard Villepontoux	France	Unknown	

==== Semifinal 6 ====
Rank	Cyclist	Nation	Time	Notes
1	Clarence Kingsbury	Great Britain	8:53.0	Q
2	Guglielmo Morisetti	Italy	Unknown	
3	Dorus Nijland	Netherlands	Unknown	
4	Gaston Dreyfus	France	Unknown	
5-6	Walter Andrews	Canada	Unknown	
5-6	Albert Calvert	Great Britain	Unknown	

==== Semifinal 7 ====
Rank	Cyclist	Nation	Time	Notes
1	Maurice Schilles	France	7:55.4	Q
2	Charlie Clark	Great Britain	Unknown	
3	William Anderson	Canada	Unknown	
4-7	Guillaume Coeckelberg	Belgium	Unknown	
4-7	Rudolf Katzer	Germany	Unknown	
4-7	Georges Perrin	France	Unknown	
4-7	Floris Venter	South Africa	Unknown	

=== Final ===
Rank	Cyclist	Nation	Time
1st place, gold medalist(s)	Benjamin Jones	Great Britain	8:36.2
2nd place, silver medalist(s)	Maurice Schilles	France	Unknown
3rd place, bronze medalist(s)	André Auffray	France	Unknown
4	Émile Marechal	France	Unknown
5	Clarence Kingsbury	Great Britain	Unknown
6	Johannes van Spengen	Netherlands	Unknown
7	Gerard Bosch van Drakenstein	Netherlands	Unknown

== Sources ==
- Cook, Theodore Andrea (1908). The Fourth Olympiad, Being the Official Report. London: British Olympic Association.
- De Wael, Herman. Herman's Full Olympians: "Cycling 1908". Accessed 7 April 2006. Available electronically at.
