= Cycling at the 1908 Summer Olympics – Men's 20 kilometres =

Cycling at the Olympics

Men's 20 kilometres at the Games of the IV Olympiad
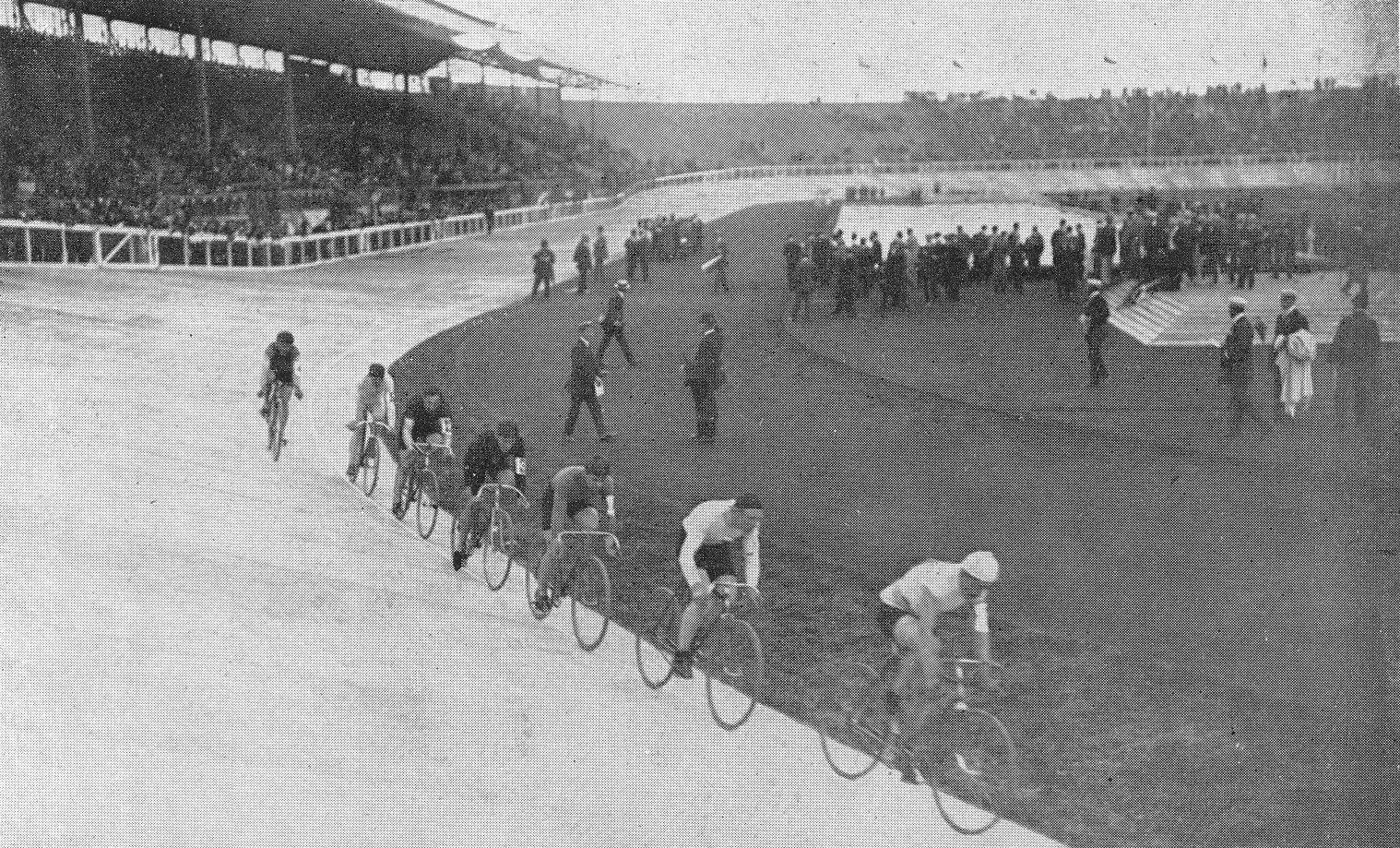
- Venue: White City Stadium
- Date: July 14, 1908
- Competitors: 44 from 10 nations

Medalists
1st place, gold medalist(s)		Clarence Kingsbury	Great Britain
2nd place, silver medalist(s)		Benjamin Jones	Great Britain
3rd place, bronze medalist(s)		Joseph Werbrouck	Belgium

The men's 20 kilometres was one of seven track cycling events on the Cycling at the 1908 Summer Olympics programme. Its distance was the second longest of the individual event distances. Each nation could enter up to 12 cyclists.

== Competition format ==
The 20 kilometres in 1908 was a unique race in Olympic history. It was in some ways like a very long sprint but with elements of a points race. Each race consisted of slightly over 33 laps of the 660 yard track. The time limit for the race was 40 minutes. The competition was held in two rounds (semifinals and a final). There were 6 semifinals. The winner of each semifinal advanced to the final, encouraging tactical riding similar to a sprint race despite the long distance. However, for the three fastest semifinals, the cyclist who led for the most laps would also advance. The final comprised 9 cyclists.

== Results ==
=== Semifinals ===
There were two methods of qualifying for the final. A cyclist could either finish first in one of the six semifinals or be the leader "of the greatest number of laps in the three fastest heats."

==== Semifinal 1 ====
Flynn had a puncture at about the halfway mark.

Rank	Cyclist	Nation	Time	Notes
1	Leonard Meredith	Great Britain	33:21.0	Q
2	Hermann Martens	Germany	33:21.2	
3	Joseph Werbrouck	Belgium	33:21.4	q
4	André Lapize	France	Unknown	
5	Georgius Damen	Netherlands	Unknown	
6	Frederick McCarthy	Canada	Unknown	
7–8	Pierre Hostein	France	Unknown	
7–8	Rudolf Katzer	Germany	Unknown	
—	Daniel Flynn	Great Britain	DNF	

==== Semifinal 2 ====
Rank	Cyclist	Nation	Time	Notes
1	Clarence Kingsbury	Great Britain	32:33.8	Q
2	Charlie Brooks	Great Britain	32:34.0	
3	Floris Venter	South Africa	32:34.4	
4	Georges Lutz	France	Unknown	
5	Gerard Bosch van Drakenstein	Netherlands	Unknown	
6	François Bonnet	France	Unknown	q
7–9	Walter Andrews	Canada	Unknown	
7–9	Jean van Benthem	Belgium	Unknown	
7–9	Paul Schulze	Germany	Unknown	

==== Semifinal 3 ====
Rank	Cyclist	Nation	Time	Notes
1	Louis Weintz	United States	33:39.8	Q
2	Frank Shore	South Africa	33:40.0	
3	Harry Young	Canada	33:45.2	
4	Herbert Bouffler	Great Britain	Unknown	
5	Max Triebsch	Germany	Unknown	
6–7	Henri Cunault	France	Unknown	
6–7	Dorus Nijland	Netherlands	Unknown	
—	Frederick Hamlin	Great Britain	DNF	

==== Semifinal 4 ====
Rank	Cyclist	Nation	Time	Notes
1	Benjamin Jones	Great Britain	32:39.0	Q
2	George Cameron	United States	32:39.2	
3	Thomas Passmore		32:39.4	
4	Octave Lapize		Unknown	q
5	Henri Baumler	France	Unknown	
6–7	Alwin Boldt	Germany	Unknown	
6–7	Johannes van Spengen	Netherlands	Unknown	
—	William Lower	Great Britain	DNF	

==== Semifinal 5 ====
Santorinaios and Texier crashed with half a lap remaining; Robertson was slowed by having to ride around them.

Rank	Cyclist	Nation	Time	Notes
1	Andrew Hansson	Sweden	34:53.6	Q
2	David Robertson	Great Britain	34:53.8	
3	William Anderson	Canada	34:55.6	
—	Ioannis Santorinaios	Greece	DNF	
—	Pierre Texier	France	DNF	

==== Semifinal 6 ====
"With nine laps to go, Coeckelberg's tyre punctured, and two laps further on the Belgian was again unlucky. He left the track, cut across the grass, seized another machine, and remounted, but was disqualified."

Rank	Cyclist	Nation	Time	Notes
1	Albert Denny	Great Britain	33:40.6	Q
2	Charles Avrillon	France	33:40.8	
3	Gustaf Westerberg	Sweden	33:41.4	
4	Guglielmo Morisetti	Italy	Unknown	
—	Léon Couckelberg	Belgium	DSQ	

=== Final ===
Meredith and Denny suffered punctures early on. Hansson fell near the end. Bonnet led most of the first half of the race. Kingsbury started his sprint shortly after the bell, "hotly challenged" by Jones, Werbrouck, and Weintz for "one of the most exciting finishes of the Games, which Kingsbury just won by three inches."

Rank	Cyclist	Nation	Time
1st place, gold medalist(s)	Clarence Kingsbury	Great Britain	34:13.6
2nd place, silver medalist(s)	Benjamin Jones	Great Britain	Unknown
3rd place, bronze medalist(s)	Joseph Werbrouck	Belgium	Unknown
4	Louis Weintz	United States	Unknown
5–9	François Bonnet	France	Unknown
5–9	Arthur Denny	Great Britain	Unknown
5–9	Andrew Hansson	Sweden	Unknown
5–9	Octave Lapize	France	Unknown
5–9	Leon Meredith	Great Britain	Unknown

== Sources ==
- Cook, Theodore Andrea (1908). The Fourth Olympiad, Being the Official Report. London: British Olympic Association.
- De Wael, Herman. Herman's Full Olympians: "Cycling 1908". Accessed 7 April 2006. Available electronically at.
