= Cycling at the 1908 Summer Olympics – Men's 100 kilometres =

Cycling at the Olympics

Men's 100 kilometres at the Games of the IV Olympiad
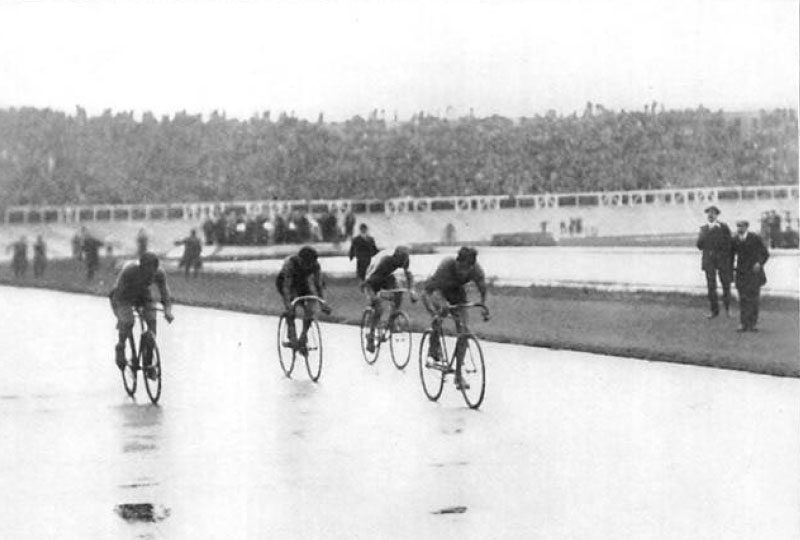
- The final lap
- Venue: White City Stadium
- Dates: July 15–18, 1908
- Competitors: 43 from 11 nations
- Winning time: 2:41:48.6

Medalists
1st place, gold medalist(s)		Charles Henry Bartlett; Great Britain
2nd place, silver medalist(s)		Charles Denny; Great Britain
3rd place, bronze medalist(s)		Octave Lapize; France

The men's 100 kilometres was one of seven track cycling events on the Cycling at the 1908 Summer Olympics programme. Its distance was the longest of the individual event distances. A challenge cup was presented by the Prince of Wales to the winner. There were 43 competitors from 11 nations. Each nation could enter up to 12 cyclists. The event was won by Charles Henry Bartlett of Great Britain, with his countryman Charles Denny finishing second. Octave Lapize earned bronze, making France the only nation to have medalists at both appearances of the 100 kilometres race (Léon Flameng won in 1896).

== Background ==
From 1896 to 1924 (excluding 1912, when no track events were held), the track cycling programme included events at a variety of distances that changed from Games to Games and ranged from the 1/4-mile to the 100 kilometres (and, even longer, the unique 12 hours race in 1896 that saw finishers exceed 300 kilometres). The 100 kilometres was held twice: in 1896 and again in 1908. The favorite in 1908 was Leon Meredith of Great Britain, who had won the world championship in 1904, 1905, and 1907 (and would win again in 1908, 1909, 1911, and 1913).

France, Germany, Great Britain, and Greece made their second appearance in the event, having competed previously in 1896 (along with Austria). Belgium, Canada, Italy, the Netherlands, South Africa, Sweden, and the United States made their only appearance in 1908.

== Competition format ==
The 100 kilometres race was conducted in two rounds, semifinals and a final. Each race was approximately 165.7 laps of the 660 yard track. The time limit for the race was 3 hours and 15 minutes. There were two semifinals. The first 6 cyclists to finish, and the 2 cyclists who led for the most laps, in each semifinal advanced to the final.

== Schedule ==
Date	Time	Round
Wednesday, 15 July 1908	10:00	Semifinal 1
Thursday, 16 July 1908	10:00	Semifinal 2
Saturday, 18 July 1908	15:30	Final

== Results ==
=== Semifinals ===
==== Semifinal 1 ====
Lutz and Hansson broke away to a 300 yard lead at lap 76. Bailey caught them shortly after the halfway mark. The three lapped the field at lap 96. Santorinaios retired at lap 96, McCarthy at lap 103, and Katzer a few minutes later. Lutz tried to break away from the group, but Hansson and Bailey stayed with him. The finish was a sprint among the top three, with Hansson making an inside move with half a lap to go and winning by half a wheel over Lutz. Bailey was two lengths behind.

Rank	Cyclist	Nation	Time	Notes
1	Andrew Hansson	Sweden	2:50:21.4	Q
2	Georges Lutz	France	Unknown	Q
3	Sydney Bailey	Great Britain	Unknown	Q
4	Pierre Texier	France	Unknown	Q
5	J. H. Bishop	Great Britain	Unknown	Q
6	David Robertson	Great Britain	Unknown	Q
7–14	William Anderson	Canada	Unknown	
7–14	Alwin Boldt	Germany	Unknown	
7–14	François Bonnet	France	Unknown	q
7–14	Georgius Damen	Netherlands	Unknown	
7–14	Gerard Bosch van Drakenstein	Netherlands	Unknown	
7–14	André Lepère	France	Unknown	
7–14	Harry Mussen	Great Britain	Unknown	q
7–14	John Norman	Great Britain	Unknown	
—	Rudolf Katzer	Germany	DNF	
—	Frederick McCarthy	Canada	DNF	
—	Ioannis Santorinaios	Greece	DNF	

==== Semifinal 2 ====
Cunault and Madelaine were lapped at five miles, with Cunault retiring shortly after. Madelaine fell at lap 44 and needed an ambulance. Avrillon, leading for stretches, retired shortly after; along with the other non-finishers to that point, there were only 15 cyclists left of the 26 starters. A crash a little after the one-hour mark eliminated Noon and Weintz, with Meredith falling but able to resume the race. After an hour and a half, Coeckelberg crashed into an athletics judge who had wandered onto the track, hitting his head on the concrete curb and sustaining cuts on his thigh and head; he was able to continue, however. Zanzottera retired at lap 60 with cramps, and Parini retired shortly after. It started to rain two hours into the race, continuing for half an hour; only nine men remained at the end of it. Seven of them finished together, with Coeckelberg 100 yards behind at the end.

It is not clear how Young advanced to the final; the Official Report says in the results of this heat that Coeckelberg and Denny qualified as having led the most laps, and in the description of the final field says that Young was "permitted to start, having satisfied the judges that he was not lapped in Heat 2."

Rank	Cyclist	Nation	Time	Notes
1	Leon Meredith	Great Britain	2:43:15.4	Q
2	Charles Henry Bartlett	Great Britain	Unknown	Q
3	Gustaf Westerberg	Sweden	Unknown	Q
4	Octave Lapize	France	Unknown	Q
5	Walter Andrews	Canada	Unknown	Q
6	William Pett	Great Britain	Unknown	Q
7	Charles Denny	Great Britain	Unknown	q
8	Guillaume Coeckelberg	Belgium	Unknown	q
9	Harry Young	Canada	Unknown	q
—	Cesare Zanzottera	Italy	DNF	
—	Charles Avrillon	France	DNF	
—	Henri Cunault	France	DNF	
—	Bruno Götze	Germany	DNF	
—	Pierre Hostein	France	DNF	
—	Robert	Great Britain	DNF	
—	Jean Madelaine	France	DNF	
—	Guglielmo Malatesta	Italy	DNF	
—	Hermann Martens	Germany	DNF	
—	William Morton	Canada	DNF	
—	Dorus Nijland	Netherlands	DNF	
—	David Noon	Great Britain	DNF	
—	Battista Parini	Italy	DNF	
—	T. H. E. Passmore	South Africa	DNF	
—	Paul Schulze	Germany	DNF	
—	Max Triebsch	Germany	DNF	
—	Louis Weintz	United States	DNF	

=== Final ===
It had rained before the start of the final and continued raining for most of the race. Meredith, Andrews, and Robertson crashed at 13 miles; they all continued but Meredith was behind the field and was lapped at lap 62, after which he retired. Bailey led at the halfway mark, but was lapped with 31 laps to go. The lead pack dwindled to seven riders at lap 115 and was down to four at the final lap. Three were British, allowing them to use teamwork to pace Bartlett for the final sprint. Denny led going into the final lap, with Lapize on the outside. Bartlett came down from the banking and sprinted to the finish, crossing the line a wheel ahead of Denny.

Rank	Cyclist	Nation	Time
1st place, gold medalist(s)	Charles Bartlett	Great Britain	2:41:48.6
2nd place, silver medalist(s)	Charles Denny	Great Britain	Unknown
3rd place, bronze medalist(s)	Octave Lapize	France	Unknown
4	William Pett	Great Britain	Unknown
5	Pierre Texier	France	Unknown
6	Walter Andrews	Canada	Unknown
7	D. C. Robertson	Great Britain	Unknown
8	Sydney Bailey	Great Britain	Unknown
—	J. H. Bishop	Great Britain	DNF
—	François Bonnet	France	DNF
—	Guillaume Coeckelberg	Belgium	DNF
—	Andrew Hansson	Sweden	DNF
—	G. C. Lutz	France	DNF
—	Leon Meredith	Great Britain	DNF
—	Harry Mussen	Great Britain	DNF
—	Gustaf Westerberg	Sweden	DNF
—	Harry Young	Canada	DNF

== Sources ==
- Cook, Theodore Andrea (1908). The Fourth Olympiad, Being the Official Report. London: British Olympic Association.
- De Wael, Herman. Herman's Full Olympians: "Cycling 1908". Accessed 7 April 2006. Available electronically at.
