= Cycling at the 1908 Summer Olympics =

Cycling at the Games of the IV Olympiad
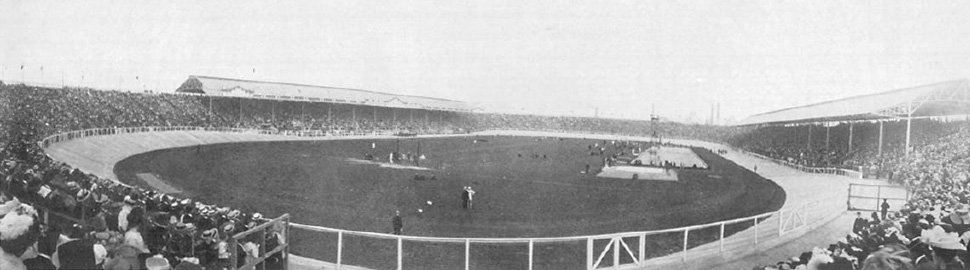
- The White City Stadium during the 1908 Summer Olympics
- Venues: White City Stadium
- Date: 13 –18 July 1908
- Competitors: 97 from 11 nations

At the 1908 Summer Olympics, seven track cycling events were contested, all for men only. The weather was poor, with rainfall causing the track to flood on occasion. The track was 660 yards (600 m) long (being built around the perimeter of the White City Stadium's athletics track); some events (the 660 yards and the team pursuit) used full laps of the track; the others used metric distances.

== Medal summary ==
Games	Gold	Silver	Bronze
660 yards	Victor Johnson; Great Britain	Émile Demangel; France	Karl Neumer; Germany
5000 metres	Benjamin Jones; Great Britain	Maurice Schilles; France	André Auffray; France
20 kilometres	Clarence Kingsbury; Great Britain	Benjamin Jones; Great Britain	Joseph Werbrouck; Belgium
100 kilometres	Charles Bartlett; Great Britain	Charles Denny; Great Britain	Octave Lapize; France
Sprint	No medalists - final was declared void as the time limit was exceeded		
Tandem	André Auffray and Maurice Schilles; France	Frederick Hamlin and Horace Johnson; Great Britain	Charlie Brooks and Walter Isaacs; Great Britain
Team pursuit	Great Britain; Benjamin Jones; Clarence Kingsbury; Leonard Meredith; Ernest Payne	Germany; Max Götze; Rudolf Katzer; Hermann Martens; Karl Neumer	Canada; William Anderson; Walter Andrews; Frederick McCarthy; William Morton

== Participating nations ==
A total of 97 cyclists from 11 nations competed at the London Games:

- Belgium (6)
- Canada (5)
- France (23)
- Germany (9)
- Great Britain (36)
- Greece (1)
- Italy (4)
- Netherlands (5)
- South Africa (4)
- Sweden (2)
- United States (2)

== Medal table ==
Rank	Nation	Gold	Silver	Bronze	Total
1	Great Britain	5	3	1	9
2	France	1	2	2	5
3	Germany	0	1	1	2
4	Belgium	0	0	1	1
4	Canada	0	0	1	1
Totals (5 entries)		6	6	6	18

== Cycle polo ==
Cycle polo was a demonstration sport at these Olympics with Ireland winning, beating Germany.
