= Cycling at the 1908 Summer Olympics – Men's tandem =

Cycling at the Olympics

Men's tandem at the Games of the IV Olympiad
- Venue: White City Stadium
- Dates: July 13–15, 1908
- Competitors: 34 from 7 nations

Medalists
1st place, gold medalist(s)		France; André Auffray, Maurice Schilles
2nd place, silver medalist(s)		Great Britain; Frederick Hamlin, Horace Johnson
3rd place, bronze medalist(s)		Great Britain; Charlie Brooks, William Isaacs

The men's 2000 metre tandem was one of seven track cycling events on the Cycling at the 1908 Summer Olympics programme. Each nation could enter up to 6 teams of 2.

== Competition format ==
The tandem race was a sprint-style race with teams of 2 on tandem bicycles. The distance was 2000 metres, or approximately 3.3 laps of the 660-yard track. The time limit for the race was 4 minutes. The competition was held over three rounds (heats, semifinals, and a final). The first round consisted of 7 heats of 2 or 3 teams each, with the winning team in each heat as well as the fastest second-place team advancing to the semifinals. There were 2 semifinals of 4 teams each; the winning team in each semifinal as well as the faster second-place team advanced to the final. The final featured 3 teams, so all finalists received medals.

== Results ==
=== First round ===
The fastest team in each of the seven heats and the fastest second-place team overall advanced to the semifinals.

The competition was held on Monday, July 13, 1908, starting at 4.15 p.m. (first four heats) and at 5.15 p.m. (remaining three heats).

==== Heat 1 ====
Rank	Cyclists	Nation	Time	Notes
1	Charlie Brooks; William Isaacs	Great Britain	3:09.4	Q
2	Alwin Boldt; Max Triebsch	Germany	5 lengths behind	

==== Heat 2 ====
Rank	Cyclists	Nation	Time	Notes
1	Frederick Hamlin; Horace Johnson	Great Britain	3:14.8	Q
2	Marc Texier; Paul Texier	France	4 lengths behind	

==== Heat 3 ====
Rank	Cyclists	Nation	Time	Notes
1	Max Götze; Otto Götze	Germany	2:55.6	Q
2	Charles Avrillon; Joseph Guyader	France	bare wheel	
3	Cecil McKaig; Edward Piercy	Great Britain	2 lengths behind 2nd	

==== Heat 4 ====
Rank	Cyclists	Nation	Time	Notes
1	Léon Coeckelberg; Jules Patou	Belgium	2:25.0	Q
2	John Barnard; Arthur Rushen	Great Britain	1.2 lengths behind	q
3	Andrew Hansson; Gustaf Westerberg	Sweden	beaten off	

==== Heat 5 ====
Rank	Cyclists	Nation	Time	Notes
1	André Auffray; Maurice Schilles	France	3:11.4	Q
2	Philipus Frylink; Floris Venter	South Africa	1 length behind	

==== Heat 6 ====
Rank	Cyclists	Nation	Time	Notes
1	François Bonnet; Octave Lapize	France	3:06.8	Q
2	Robert Jolly; John Norman	Great Britain	6 lengths behind	

==== Heat 7 ====
Rank	Cyclists	Nation	Time	Notes
1	John Matthews; Leonard Meredith	Great Britain	2:43.2	Q
2	Gaston Dreyfus; André Poulain	France	2 lengths behind	
3	Frederick McCarthy; William Morton	Canada	beaten off	

=== Semifinals ===
The fastest team in each heat as well as the fastest second-place team overall advanced to the final.

The competition was held on Wednesday, July 15, 1908, starting at 5 p.m.

==== Semifinal 1 ====
Rank	Cyclists	Nation	Time	Notes
1	Frederick Hamlin; Horace Johnson	Great Britain	2:42.2	Q
2	Charlie Brooks; William Isaacs	Great Britain	6 lengths behind	q
3	Max Götze; Otto Götze	Germany	Unknown	
4	Léon Coeckelberg; Jules Patou	Belgium	Unknown	

==== Semifinal 2 ====
Rank	Cyclists	Nation	Time	Notes
1	André Auffray; Maurice Schilles	France	2:46.2	Q
2	John Matthews; Leonard Meredith	Great Britain	1 length behind	
3	John Barnard; Arthur Rushen	Great Britain	Unknown	
4	François Bonnet; Octave Lapize	France	Unknown	

=== Final ===
The final was held on Wednesday, July 15, 1908, at 5.45 p.m.

Rank	Cyclists	Nation	Time
1st place, gold medalist(s)	André Auffray; Maurice Schilles	France	3:07.6
2nd place, silver medalist(s)	Frederick Hamlin; Horace Johnson	Great Britain	Unknown
3rd place, bronze medalist(s)	Charlie Brooks; William Isaacs	Great Britain	Unknown

== Sources ==
- Cook, Theodore Andrea (1908). The Fourth Olympiad, Being the Official Report. London: British Olympic Association.
- De Wael, Herman. Herman's Full Olympians: "Cycling 1908". Accessed 7 April 2006. Available electronically at.
