= Germany at the 1908 Summer Olympics =

- Flag of the German Empire
- IOC code: GER
- NOC: German Imperial Commission for the Olympic Games

in London
- Competitors: 81 (79 men, 2 women)
- Flag bearer: Wilhelm Kaufmann
- Medals Ranked 5th: Gold 3 Silver 5 Bronze 5 Total 13

Summer Olympics appearances (overview)
- 1896; 1900; 1904; 1908; 1912; 1920–1924; 1928; 1932; 1936; 1948; 1952; 1956–1988; 1992; 1996; 2000; 2004; 2008; 2012; 2016; 2020; 2024

Other related appearances
- 1906 Intercalated Games –––– Saar (1952); United Team of Germany (1956–1964); East Germany (1968–1988); West Germany (1968–1988)

Germany competed at the 1908 Summer Olympics in London, United Kingdom.

== Medalists ==
Medal	Name	Sport	Event	Date
Gold	Albert Zürner	Diving	Men's 3 m springboard	July 18
Gold	Heinrich Burger, Anna Hübler	Figure skating	Pairs	October 29
Gold	Arno Bieberstein	Swimming	Men's 100 m backstroke	July 17
Silver	Hanns Braun, Hans Eicke, Arthur Hoffmann, Otto Trieloff	Athletics	Men's medley relay	July 25
Silver	Max Götze, Rudolf Katzer, Hermann Martens, Karl Neumer	Cycling	Men's team pursuit	July 17
Silver	Kurt Behrens	Diving	Men's 3 m springboard	July 18
Silver	Elsa Rendschmidt	Figure skating	Ladies' singles	October 29
Silver	Otto Froitzheim	Tennis	Men's singles	July 11
Bronze	Hanns Braun	Athletics	Men's 800 m	July 21
Bronze	Karl Neumer	Cycling	Men's 660 yd	July 15
Bronze	Gottlob Walz	Diving	Men's 3 m springboard	July 18
Bronze	Bernhard von Gaza	Rowing	Men's single sculls	July 31
Bronze	Willy Düskow, Martin Stahnke	Rowing	Men's coxless pair	July 31

== Results by event ==
=== Athletics ===
Germany's best athletics result was a silver medal in the medley relay.

Event	Place	Athlete	Heats	Semifinals	Final
Men's 100 metres	Heats	Carl Bechler	11.4 seconds 2nd, heat 17	Did not advance	
Men's 100 metres	Heats	Arthur Hoffmann	11.4 seconds 3rd, heat 3	Did not advance	
Men's 100 metres	Heats	Hans Eicke	11.6 seconds 3rd, heat 7	Did not advance	
Men's 100 metres	Heats	Heinrich Rehder	11.8 seconds 3rd, heat 8	Did not advance	
Men's 100 metres	Heats	Willy Kohlmey	12.0 seconds 3rd, heat 15	Did not advance	
Men's 100 metres	Heats	Hermann von Bonninghausen	12.0 seconds 5th, heat 14	Did not advance	
Men's 100 metres	—	Paul Fischer	Did not finish —, heat 10	Did not advance	
Men's 200 metres	Heats	Arthur Hoffmann	Unknown; 2nd, heat 13	Did not advance	
Men's 400 metres	Heats	Otto Trieloff	Unknown; 2nd, heat 14	Did not advance	
Men's 800 metres	3rd	Hanns Braun	None held	1:58.0; 1st, semifinal 7	1:55.2
Men's 800 metres	Semi- finalist	Andreas Breynck	None held	Unknown; 2nd, semifinal 6	Did not advance
Men's 800 metres	Semi- finalist	Oskar Quarg	None held	Unknown; 4th, semifinal 5	Did not advance
Men's 1500 metres	Semi- finalist	Andreas Breynck	None held	Unknown; 2nd, semifinal 6	Did not advance
Men's 1500 metres	Semi- finalist	Hanns Braun	None held	Unknown; 3rd, semifinal 8	Did not advance
Men's 1500 metres	Semi- finalist	Arno Hesse	None held	Unknown; 7th, semifinal 2	Did not advance
Men's medley relay	2nd	Arthur Hoffmann; Hans Eicke; Otto Trieloff; Hanns Braun	None held	3:43.2; 1st, semifinal 2	3:32.4
Men's 5 miles	Semi- finalist	Paul Nettelbeck	None held	Unknown; 5th, semifinal 3	Did not advance
Men's marathon	—	Fritz Reiser	None held		Did not finish
Men's marathon	—	H. Muller	None held		Did not start
Men's marathon	—	Paul Nettelbeck	None held		Did not start
Men's 3500 metre walk	Semi- finalist	Paul Gunia	None held	16:38.0; 4th, semifinal 1	Did not advance
Men's 3500 metre walk	Semi- finalist	Richard Wilhelm	None held	17:33.8; 6th, semifinal 3	Did not advance
Men's 10 mile walk	Semi- finalist	Paul Gunia	None held	1:26:09.4; 7th, semifinal 1	Did not advance

Event	Place	Athlete	Height/ Distance
Men's long jump	6th	Albert Weinstein	6.77 metres
Men's long jump	15th	Arthur Hoffmann	6.50 metres
Men's long jump	21-32	Hermann von Bonninghausen	Unknown
Men's long jump	21-32	Ludwig Uetwiller	6.05 metres
Men's standing high jump	8th	Arthur Mallwitz	1.42 metres
Men's standing high jump	17th	Ludwig Uetwiller	1.32 metres
Men's standing long jump	8-25	Arthur Mallwitz	Unknown
Men's discus throw	11th	Emil Welz	37.02 metres
Men's discus throw	12-42	Ludwig Uetwiller	Unknown
Men's hammer throw	10-19	Ludwig Uetwiller	Unknown
Men's javelin throw	8-16	Carl Bechler	Unknown
Men's freestyle javelin	10-33	Ludwig Uetwiller	Unknown
Men's freestyle javelin	10-33	Emil Welz	Unknown

=== Cycling ===
Germany's best cycling result was the silver medal won in the team pursuit event.

Event	Place	Cyclist	Heats	Semifinals	Final
Men's 660 yards	3rd	Karl Neumer	54.2 seconds 1st, heat 11	1:05.6; 1st, semifinal 4	Unknown
Men's 660 yards	Heats	Richard Katzer	Unknown; 2nd, heat 3	Did not advance	
Men's 660 yards	Heats	Hermann Martens	Unknown; 2nd, heat 7	Did not advance	
Men's 660 yards	Heats	Bruno Götze	Unknown; 3rd, heat 10	Did not advance	
Men's 660 yards	Heats	Paul Schulze	Unknown; 3rd, heat 13	Did not advance	
Men's 5000 metres	Semi- finalist	Hermann Martens	None held	Unknown; 2nd, semifinal 3	Did not advance
Men's 5000 metres	Semi- finalist	Karl Neumer	None held	Unknown; 2nd, semifinal 5	Did not advance
Men's 5000 metres	Semi- finalist	Bruno Götze	None held	Unknown; 4th, semifinal 3	Did not advance
Men's 5000 metres	Semi- finalist	Richard Katzer	None held	Unknown; 4-7, semifinal 7	Did not advance
Men's 5000 metres	Semi- finalist	Max Götze	None held	Unknown; 4-9, semifinal 5	Did not advance
Men's 20 kilometres	Semi- finalist	Hermann Martens	None held	33:21.2; 2nd, semifinal 1	Did not advance
Men's 20 kilometres	Semi- finalist	Max Triebsch	None held	Unknown; 5th, semifinal 3	Did not advance
Men's 20 kilometres	Semi- finalist	Alwin Boldt	None held	Unknown; 6-7, semifinal 4	Did not advance
Men's 20 kilometres	Semi- finalist	Richard Katzer	None held	Unknown; 7-8, semifinal 1	Did not advance
Men's 20 kilometres	Semi- finalist	Paul Schulze	None held	Unknown; 7-9, semifinal 2	Did not advance
Men's 100 kilometres	Semi- finalist	Alwin Boldt	None held	Unknown; 7-14, semifinal 1	Did not advance
Men's 100 kilometres	—	Richard Katzer	None held	Did not finish —, semifinal 1	Did not advance
Men's 100 kilometres	—	Bruno Götze	None held	Did not finish —, semifinal 2	Did not advance
Men's 100 kilometres	—	Hermann Martens	None held	Did not finish —, semifinal 2	Did not advance
Men's 100 kilometres	—	Paul Schulze	None held	Did not finish —, semifinal 2	Did not advance
Men's 100 kilometres	—	Max Triebsch	None held	Did not finish —, semifinal 2	Did not advance
Men's sprint	Semi- finalist	Karl Neumer	1:33.2; 1st, heat 7	Unknown; 2nd, semifinal 1	Did not advance
Men's sprint	Heats	Paul Schulze	Unknown; 3rd, heat 4	Did not advance	
Men's sprint	Heats	Bruno Götze	Unknown; 3rd, heat 12	Did not advance	
Men's sprint	—	Hermann Martens	Time limit exceeded —, heat 6	Did not advance	
Men's tandem	Semi- finalist	Max Götze; Otto Götze	2:05.6; 1st, heat 3	Unknown; 3rd, semifinal 1	Did not advance
Men's tandem	Heats	Alwin Boldt; Hermann Martens	Unknown; 2nd, heat 1	Did not advance	
Men's team pursuit	2nd	Max Götze; Richard Katzer; Hermann Martens; Karl Neumer	2:25.4; 1st, heat 4	2:31.8; 1st, semifinal 2	2:28.6

=== Diving ===
Germany dominated the springboard diving in 1908, taking all three medals in the event (including a tie for third place with an American diver).

Event	Place	Diver	Preliminary groups	Semi- finals	Final
Men's 10 metre platform	10th	Heinz Freyschmidt	67.30 points 2nd, group 3	48.80 points 5th, semifinal 2	Did not advance
Men's 10 metre platform	22nd	Fritz Nicolai	54.50 points 5th, group 5	Did not advance	
Men's 3 metre springboard	1st	Albert Zürner	83.60 points 1st, group 2	82.80 points 2nd, semifinal 2	85.50 points
Men's 3 metre springboard	2nd	Kurt Behrens	83.60 points 1st, group 3	83.00 points 1st, semifinal 1	85.30 points
Men's 3 metre springboard	3rd	Gottlob Walz	81.30 points 1st, group 5	80.30 points 2nd, semifinal 1	80.80 points
Men's 3 metre springboard	5th	Fritz Nicolai	67.10 points 2nd, group 4	81.80 points 3rd, semifinal 2	Did not advance
Men's 3 metre springboard	8th	Heinz Freyschmidt	78.10 points 2nd, group 1	79.3 points 4th, semifinal 1	Did not advance

=== Fencing ===
Event	Place	Fencer	First round	Second round	Semi- final	Final
Men's épée	First round	Johannes Adam	1-4 (4th in C)	Did not advance		
Men's épée	First round	Emil Schön	4-3 (4th in G)	Did not advance		
Men's épée	First round	Ernst Moldenhauer	1-4 (4th in J)	Did not advance		
Men's épée	First round	Julius Lichtenfels	2-3 (4th in M)	Did not advance		
Men's épée	First round	Albert Naumann	1-4 (5th in F)	Did not advance		
Men's épée	First round	Jakob Erckrath de Bary	4-4 (5th in H)	Did not advance		
Men's épée	First round	Georg Stöhr	2-5 (6th in A)	Did not advance		
Men's épée	First round	Fritz Jack	2-5 (6th in B)	Did not advance		
Men's épée	First round	August Petri	2-6 (6th in I)	Did not advance		
Men's épée	First round	Robert Krünert	2-6 (7th in E)	Did not advance		
Men's sabre	Second round	August Petri	2-2 (3rd in F)	2-2 (3rd in 7)	Did not advance	
Men's sabre	Second round	Emil Schön	4-2 (2nd in M)	1-3 (4th in 5)	Did not advance	
Men's sabre	Second round	Fritz Jack	3-2 (2nd in C)	1-3 (5th in 2)	Did not advance	
Men's sabre	First round	Julius Lichtenfels	2-2 (4th in D)	Did not advance		
Men's sabre	First round	Robert Krünert	2-3 (4th in H)	Did not advance		
Men's sabre	First round	Johannes Adam	1-3 (5th in B)	Did not advance		
Men's sabre	First round	Jakob Erkrath de Bary	1-4 (5th in G)	Did not advance		
Men's sabre	First round	Ernst Moldenhauer	1-4 (5th in K)	Did not advance		
Men's sabre	First round	Georg Stöhr	2-4 (6th in J)	Did not advance		
Men's sabre	First round	Albert Naumann	0-5 (6th in L	Did not advance		

Event	Place	Fencers	Play-in match	First round	Semi- finals	Final	Repechage	Silver medal match
Men's team épée	6th	Jakob Erckrath de Bary; Julius Lichtenfels; August Petri; Georg Stöhr	Bye	Lost to Great Britain; 13-5 Out; 6th place	Did not advance		Not relegated	
Men's team sabre	4th	Jakob Erckrath de Bary; Fritz Jack; Robert Krünert; August Petri	Not held	Lost to Hungary; 9-0 Relegated to repechage	Did not advance		Lost to Italy; 10-4 Out; 4th place	Did not advance

=== Figure skating ===
Event	Place	Skater	Score
Women's individual	2nd	Elsa Rendschmidt	211.0
Mixed pairs	1st	Anna Hübler; Heinrich Burger	11.2

=== Gymnastics ===
Gymnast	Event	Score	Rank
Curt Steuernagel	Men's all-around	273.5	4
Friedrich Wolf	Men's all-around	267	5
Karl Borchert	Men's all-around	246	12
Wilhelm Weber	Men's all-around	220	28
Josef Krämer	Men's all-around	212	33
Heinrich Siebenhaar	Men's all-around	198.5	40
Paul Fischer	Men's all-around	198	41
Georg Karth	Men's all-around	186.5	50
Carl Körting	Men's all-around	181	52
Wilhelm Kaufmann	Men's all-around	180.5	53
August Ehrich	Men's all-around	156.75	65

=== Hockey ===
Event	Place	Players	First round	Semifinals	Final	5th/6th
Men's hockey	5th	Alfons Brehm, Elard Dauelsberg, Franz Diederichsen, Carl Ebert, Jules Fehr, Mauricio Galvao, Raulino Galvao, Fritz Möding, Friedrich Rahe, Albert Studemann, Friedrich Uhl	Lost vs. GBR Scotland; 4-0	Did not advance		Won vs. France; 1-0

Opponent nation	Wins	Losses	Percent
France	1	0	1.000
Great Britain	0	1	.000
Total	1	1	.500

=== Rowing ===
Event	Place	Rowers	First round	Quarter- finals	Semi- finals	Final
Men's single sculls	3rd	Bernhard von Gaza	9.35; 1st, heat 1	9.47; 1st, quarterfinal 1	Did not finish —, semifinal 2	Did not advance
Men's coxless pair	3rd	Martin Stahnke; Willy Düskow	None held		Unknown; 2nd, semifinal 2	Did not advance

=== Shooting ===
Germany had one shooter compete in one event, placing last in the 49-man field.

Event	Place	Shooter	Score
Men's 1000 yard free rifle	49th	Ernst Wagner-Hohenlobbese	12

=== Swimming ===
Event	Place	Swimmer	Heats	Semifinals	Final
Men's 100 metre backstroke	1st	Arno Bieberstein	1:25.6; 1st, heat 1	1:25.6; 1st, semifinal 1	1:24.6
Men's 100 metre backstroke	4th	Gustav Aurisch	1:27.4; 1st, heat 7	1:28.2; 1st, semifinal 1	Unknown
Men's 100 metre backstroke	Semi- finalist	Max Ritter	1:33.4; 1st, heat 2	Unknown; 3rd, semifinal 1	Did not advance
Men's 200 metre breaststroke	Semi- finalist	Erich Zeidel	3:17.2; 1st, heat 3	Unknown; 3rd, semifinal 1	Did not advance
Men's 200 metre breaststroke	Heats	Richard Rösler	3:18.0; 2nd, heat 1	Did not advance	

=== Tennis ===
Germany was the second-most successful nation in tennis in 1908, winning a silver medal in the men's singles to prevent Great Britain from sweeping the silver medals as well as the 6 gold medals.

Event	Place	Name	Round of 64	Round of 32	Round of 16	Quarter- finals	Semi- finals	Final
Men's singles	2nd	Otto Froitzheim	Defeated K. Powell	Defeated Kreuzer	Defeated Parke	Defeated Caridia	Defeated Richardson	Lost to Ritchie
Men's singles	9th	Moritz von Bissing	Bye	Defeated Zborzil	Lost to Eaves	Did not advance		
Men's singles	16th	Oscar Kreuzer	Defeated Piepes	Lost to Froitzheim	Did not advance			
Men's singles	16th	Heinrich Schomburgk	Bye	Lost to Germot	Did not advance			
Men's singles	26th	Friedrich Wilhelm Rahe	Lost to Dixon	Did not advance				
Men's doubles	7th	Otto Froitzheim; Heinrich Schomburgk	None held	Defeated; Kreuzer/Rahe	Lost to Gauntlett/Kitson	Did not advance		
Men's doubles	11th	Oscar Kreuzer; Friedrich Wilhelm Rahe	None held	Lost to Froitzheim/Schomburgk	Did not advance			

Opponent nation	Wins	Losses	Percent
Austria	2	0	1.000
France	0	1	.000
Great Britain	3	3	.500
South Africa	1	1	.500
Total international	6	5	.545
Germany	2	2	.500
Total	8	7	.533

=== Wrestling ===
Event	Place	Wrestler	Round of 32	Round of 16	Quarter- finals	Semi- finals	Final
Greco-Roman middleweight	17th	Wilhelm Grundmann	Lost to Belmer	Did not advance			

Opponent nation	Wins	Losses	Percent
Netherlands	0	1	.000
Total	0	1	.000

== Sources ==
- Cook, Theodore Andrea (1908). The Fourth Olympiad, Being the Official Report. London: British Olympic Association.
- De Wael, Herman (2001). "Top London 1908 Olympians". Herman's Full Olympians. Archived from the original on 12 July 2006.
