= Cycling at the 1908 Summer Olympics – Men's team pursuit =

Men's team pursuit at the Games of the IV Olympiad
- Venue: White City Stadium
- Date: July 17, 1908
- Competitors: 20 from 5 nations

Medalists
1st place, gold medalist(s)		Great Britain; Benjamin Jones, Clarence Kingsbury, Leon Meredith, Ernest Payne
2nd place, silver medalist(s)		Germany; Max Götze, Rudolf Katzer, Hermann Martens, Karl Neumer
3rd place, bronze medalist(s)		Canada; William Anderson, Walter Andrews, Frederick McCarthy, William Morton

The men's team pursuit was one of seven track cycling events on the Cycling at the 1908 Summer Olympics programme. It was the first appearance of a pursuit-style event. Each nation could enter 1 team of 4 cyclists.

== Competition format ==
In the team pursuit competition, teams started at opposite sides of the track. Each team raced three laps of the track, comprising 1980 yards (1,810.5 m). The third cyclist in each four-man team to finish set the time for the team. The competition consisted of three rounds (heats, semifinals, and a final); in each round, two teams competed in each heat. The winner of each heat advanced. The bronze medal was awarded based on the time of the two semifinal losers rather than a direct competition.

== Results ==
=== First round ===
==== Heat 1 ====
Rank	Cyclists	Nation	Time	Notes
1	Benjamin Jones; Clarence Kingsbury; Leon Meredith; Ernest Payne	Great Britain	Walkover	Q
–	Unknown	Belgium	DNS	

==== Heat 2 ====
Rank	Cyclists	Nation	Time	Notes
1	William Anderson; Walter Andrews; Frederick McCarthy; William Morton	Canada	Walkover	Q
2	Unknown	United States	DNS	

==== Heat 3 ====
The Dutch team had a bye in the first round.

Rank	Cyclists	Nation	Time	Notes
1	Gerard Bosch van Drakestein; Antonie Gerrits; Dorus Nijland; Johannes van Spengen	Netherlands	Walkover	Q

==== Heat 4 ====
In the only contested heat in the first round, the German team eliminated the French.

Rank	Cyclists	Nation	Time	Notes
1	Max Götze; Rudolf Katzer; Hermann Martens; Karl Neumer	Germany	2:25.4	Q
2	André Auffray; Émile Demangel; Émile Marechal; Maurice Schilles	France	2:32.0	

=== Semifinals ===
==== Semifinal 1 ====
The Canadians received third place overall as the faster of the two semifinal losers, while the British team moved on to the final.

Rank	Cyclists	Nation	Time	Notes
1	Benjamin Jones; Clarence Kingsbury; Leon Meredith; Ernest Payne	Great Britain	2:19.6	Q
2 ( (bronze) )	William Anderson; Walter Andrews; Frederick McCarthy; William Morton	Canada	2:29.2	

==== Semifinal 2 ====
Rank	Cyclists	Nation	Time	Notes
1	Max Götze; Rudolf Katzer; Hermann Martens; Karl Neumer	Germany	2:31.8	Q
2	Gerard Bosch van Drakestein; Antonie Gerrits; Dorus Nijland; Johannes van Spengen	Netherlands	2:44.0	

=== Final ===
Place	Cyclists	Nation	Time
1st place, gold medalist(s)	Benjamin Jones; Clarence Kingsbury; Leon Meredith; Ernest Payne	Great Britain	2:18.6
2nd place, silver medalist(s)	Max Götze; Rudolf Katzer; Hermann Martens; Karl Neumer	Germany	2:28.6

== Sources ==
- Cook, Theodore Andrea (1908). The Fourth Olympiad, Being the Official Report. London: British Olympic Association.
- De Wael, Herman. Herman's Full Olympians: "Cycling 1908". Accessed 7 April 2006. Available electronically at.
