= Ernest Payne (cyclist) =

English cyclist

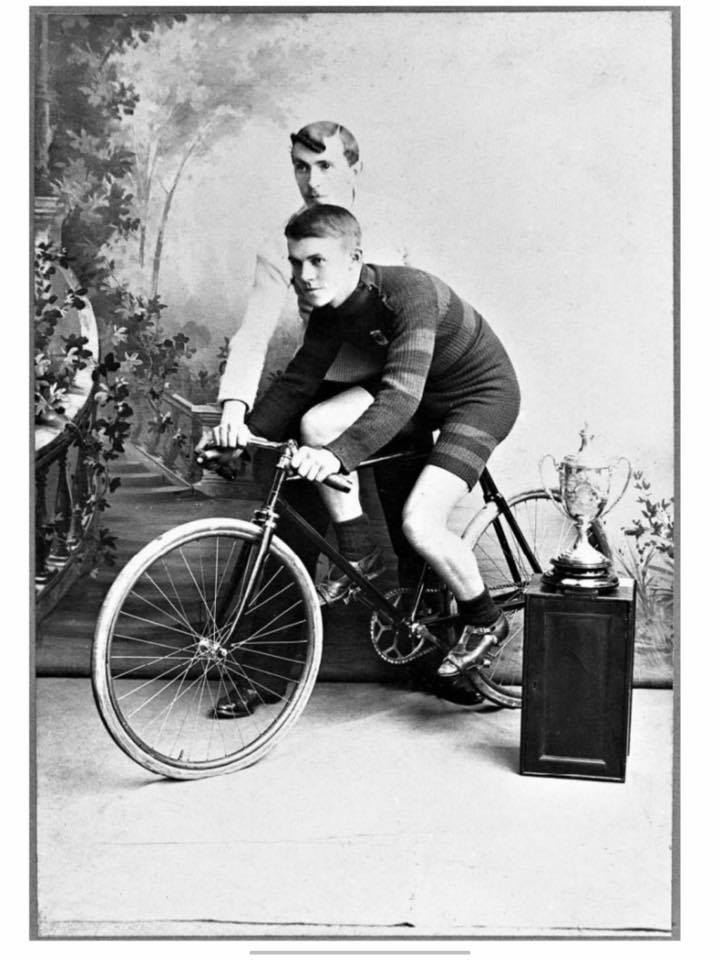

Personal information
- Nicknames: Ernie, "The Worcester Wonder"
- Born: 23 December 1884 Worcester, England, United Kingdom
- Died: 10 September 1961 (aged 76)

Cycling career
- Sport: Cycling
- Discipline: Track
- Role: Rider

Amateur team
- 1902–1910: 1903 – St Johns Club

Major wins
- 1908 – Olympic Team Pursuit, Gold; 1908 – Olympics, Men's 660 yards, won heat 1908 – Olympics, Men's sprint, won heat 1902 – Stourbridge, half-mile handicap 1904 – 'Bath' Challenge Cup; 1902–1910 More than 150 victories including Regional, National, British Empire and Olympic
Medal record
Men's track cycling
Representing Great Britain
Olympic Games
| Gold medal – first place | 1908 London | Team Pursuit |

Ernest Payne (23 December 1884 – 10 September 1961) was an English track cycling racer. Born in Worcester, he won a gold medal in the team pursuit at the 1908 Summer Olympics in London for Great Britain and went on to play football, including two games as an amateur for Manchester United.

== Background ==
Payne was born in a cottage at Red Hill, Worcester, in 1884 to John Payne, a gardener, and his wife Annie (née Morris). He worked as a carpenter. As his cycling prowess grew, his employer gave him time off to compete. Payne gave him a gold watch in thanks.

== Cycling career ==
Ernest Payne's cycling talent was spotted at Boughton Park in Worcester. T W Badgery of the Worcester St Johns Cycling Club (speaking at a golden jubilee dinner in 1938) said that he borrowed his brother's bicycle "and it was seen at once that he was going to be a champion". Payne joined the St Johns club in 1903.

Payne was stocky, five feet six and a half inches (17 cm) tall and weighing ten stone and seven pounds (3.2 kg). He was trained by his brother Walter, a successful racing cyclist. Walter's assistant was Arthur Hale, brother of Worcester racing cyclist Frederick Hale.

Payne's first race was in 1902, on 14 July at Stourbridge. He crashed and damaged his bicycle but went on to win the half-mile handicap (handicap 75 yards) on a borrowed bike. During his first season, he won 13 of 14 track races (coming second in the other). He specialised in half and one-mile races. By the end of June 1903, he was referred to as "the Worcester Wonder" in The Cyclist. The majority of his racing was on grass, but he proved at home on permanent velodromes.

One of his major trophies was the Challenge Cup. The cup contained 450 ozt (14 kg) of silver and was 4 feet (1.2 m) high. He won it outright at the 1904 Whitsun meeting in Bath, Somerset. He won more than 150 races, including regional, national, British Empire, and Olympic championships.

In his first season, Payne used a locally made machine, but in 1903 he rode an Imperial Rover, having also changed his tyres from Dunlop Road Racing to Dunlop Sprint tyres.

== 1908 London Olympics ==
=== Team pursuit ===
The Team pursuit took place over three laps of the 660-yard track at the White City Stadium in London's Shepherd's Bush. Payne, 23, rode with Benjamin Jones, Clarence Kingsbury and Leonard Meredith in the British team.

The team had a walkover in the first round when the Belgian team did not start. In the semi-final, they beat Canada (eventual bronze medal winners) with 2:19.6 to Canada's 2:29.2.

In the final, Payne led the team to victory with pace-making over the last two laps of the 1,980 yards (1,810 m) event. They recorded 2:18.6, beating the silver medal-winning German team by 10 seconds.

=== Other events ===
Payne competed in the 660 yards event, winning his heat but getting knocked out in the semi-final. In the 5000 metres he did not finish his semi-final. In the Sprint he won his heat but was defeated in the semi-final.

== Football ==
Ernest Payne's cycle racing career seems to have finished in 1910, although he had been playing football since at least 1908. In 1910, he played for Worcester Early Closers before signing for Worcester City, and he was on the team that won the Birmingham League in 1912.

Payne played twice as an amateur for Manchester United in 1908–09, when he is recorded as having signed from Worcester City. He made his debut against Nottingham Forest in a League Division One match on 27 February 1909, standing in when Billy Meredith was playing for Wales.

In his last match, he scored the goal that held Sunderland to a 2–2 draw at United's ground. The Manchester Evening News reported: "Payne could do very little, and it was on the left wing that Manchester invariably made progress... Payne was inclined to show more vigour, but he was a very weak spot indeed.". The paper reported that it was a scrappy game in which each team's defence played a more important part than the forwards. It said Payne redeemed himself when

"clever play by Wall forced a corner and from this, the ball went over to the right, Payne meeting it and putting it swiftly into the net... then in the closing minutes, from a shot by Payne, Turner nearly rushed through the winning goal."

He left Manchester United in June 1909.

== War service ==
Payne was a motorcycle dispatch rider with the Guards' Division in World War I. His gold medal was lost while he was in France during the war. But a replica is held by Worcester City Museum.

== Death and memorial ==
Ernest Payne died in 1961. The Worcester Evening News reported the event without mentioning his Olympic gold medal. Nor was the medal recorded in the Worcester St Johns club minutes. His widow presented the club with money to buy an Ernest Payne shield. It is awarded annually to the club's juvenile champion.
