= Parini =

Parini is a surname. Notable people with the surname include:

- Battista Parini, Italian cyclist
- Giuseppe Parini (1729–1799), Italian poet
- Jay Parini (born 1948), American writer and academic
- Margherita Parini (born 1972), Italian snowboarder
