= Hermann Martens =

German cyclist (1877–1916)

Personal information
- Born: 16 April 1877 Berlin, Germany
- Died: 1916 (aged 38–39)

Cycling career
- Sport: Cycling
- Discipline: Track
- Role: Rider

Professional team
- 1908: German Olympic Cycling Team
Medal record
Representing Germany
Men's track cycling
Olympic Games
Silver medal – second place	1908 London	team pursuit

Hermann Martens (16 April 1877 in Berlin – 1916) was a German track cyclist who competed in the 1908 Summer Olympics.

He won the silver medal together with his teammates Karl Neumer, Max Götze, and Rudolf Katzer in the team pursuit. He also competed in the 660 yards sprint, in the 5000 metres race, in the 20 kilometres, and in the 1000 metre sprint, but was always eliminated in the first round. He also participated in the 100 kilometres race, but was not able to finish the race. In the tandem event together with Alwin Boldt, he was also dropped out in the first round.
