= Morisetti =

Morisetti is an Italian surname. Notable people with the surname include:

- Guglielmo Morisetti (1886–?), Italian cyclist
- Neil Morisetti, British Royal Navy admiral
