= Max Götze =

German cyclist (1880–1944)

Personal information
- Born: 13 October 1880
- Died: 29 October 1944 (aged 64)

Cycling career
- Sport: Cycling
- Discipline: Track cycling
- Role: Rider

Professional teams
- 1906: German Intercalated Cycling Team
- 1908: German Olympic Cycling Team
Medal record
Men's track cycling
Representing Germany
Olympic Games
Silver medal – second place	1908 London	Team pursuit
Intercalated Games
Silver medal – second place	1906 Athens	Tandem

Max Götze (13 October 1880 – 29 October 1944) was a German track cycling racer who competed in the 1908 Summer Olympics.

== Career ==
He won the silver medal together with his teammates Karl Neumer, Rudolf Katzer, and Hermann Martens in the team pursuit. He also competed in the 5000 metres race, but was eliminated in the first round. In the tandem event together with Otto Götze, he was dropped out in the semifinals.

At the 1906 Intercalated Games in Athens, he was also able to win a silver medal in the tandem event together with his brother Bruno Götze.
