= Charles Denny =

Charles Denny may refer to:

- Charles R. Denny (1912–2000), general counsel of the United States Federal Communications Commission
- Charles Denny (cyclist) (1886–1971), British cyclist
- Charles L. Denny, namesake of Denny-Blaine Park, Seattle
- Sir Charles Alistair Maurice Denny, 4th Baronet (born 1950), of the Denny baronets

== See also ==
- Charles Dennée (1863–1946), American composer
