= South Africa at the 1908 Summer Olympics =

- The Union Flag flew over South Africa before 1910
- IOC code: RSA (ZAF used at these Games)
- NOC: South African Olympic and Empire Games Association

in London
- Competitors: 14
- Flag bearer: Doug Stupart
- Medals Ranked 14th: Gold 1 Silver 1 Bronze 0 Total 2

Summer Olympics appearances (overview)
- 1904; 1908; 1912; 1920; 1924; 1928; 1932; 1936; 1948; 1952; 1956; 1960; 1964–1988; 1992; 1996; 2000; 2004; 2008; 2012; 2016; 2020; 2024; 2028

South Africa competed at the 1908 Summer Olympics in London, United Kingdom. At the time, South Africa consisted of four separate British colonies — the Cape Colony, Natal Colony, the Orange River Colony and the Transvaal Colony; they would form the Union of South Africa in 1910. At the 1908 Olympics, the South African team competed under a flag described as "the Red Ensign with a springbok in the corner."

Hurdler Doug Stupart carried the flag at the opening ceremony.

== Medalists ==
Medal	Name	Sport	Event	Date
Gold	Reggie Walker	Athletics	Men's 100 m	July 22
Silver	Charles Hefferon	Athletics	Men's marathon	July 24

== Results by event ==
=== Athletics ===
South Africa was one of 5 nations to win at least one gold medal in athletics, taking the gold medal in the short sprint. Reggie Walker was the 100 metres champion, setting a new Olympic record in the semifinals and matching it in the final. Charles Hefferon added a silver medal in the marathon.

Event	Place	Athlete	Heats	Semifinals	Final
Men's 100 metres	1st	Reggie Walker	11.0 seconds 1st, heat 4	10.8 seconds (OR); 1st, semifinal 1	10.8 seconds (=OR)
Men's 100 metres	Semi- finalist	Edward Duffy	11.6 seconds 1st, heat 1	Unknown; 3rd, semifinal 3	Did not advance
Men's 100 metres	—	Herbert Phillips	Did not finish —, heat 11	Did not advance	
Men's 200 metres	Heats	Edward Duffy	Unknown; 2nd, heat 2	Did not advance	
Men's 110 metre hurdles	Heats	Douglas Stupart	Unknown; 3rd, heat 1	Did not advance	
Men's 5 miles	4th	Charles Hefferon	None held	Unknown; 2nd, semifinal 1	25:44.0
Men's marathon	2nd	Charles Hefferon	None held		2:56:06.0
Men's marathon	—	J. N. Mitchell-Baker	None held		Did not finish
Men's marathon	—	A. B. Mole	None held		Did not start
Men's marathon	—	C. E. Stevens	None held		Did not start
Men's marathon	—	Vincent	None held		Did not start

Event	Place	Athlete	Distance
Men's triple jump	10th	Douglas Stupart	13.40 metres

=== Cycling ===
Event	Place	Cyclist	Heats	Semifinals	Final
Men's 660 yards	Semi- finalist	Floris Venter	1:03.2; 1st, heat 10	Unknown; 4th, semifinal 2	Did not advance
Men's 660 yards	Heats	Thomas Passmore	Unknown; 2nd, heat 9	Did not advance	
Men's 660 yards	Heats	Philipus Frylink	Unknown; 3rd, heat 16	Did not advance	
Men's 660 yards	—	Frank Shore	Time limit exceeded —, heat 5	Did not advance	
Men's 5000 metres	Semi- finalist	Philipus Frylink	None held	Unknown; 3rd, semifinal 3	Did not advance
Men's 5000 metres	Semi- finalist	Thomas Passmore	None held	Unknown; 4th, semifinal 4	Did not advance
Men's 5000 metres	Semi- finalist	Floris Venter	None held	Unknown; 4-7, semifinal 7	Did not advance
Men's 5000 metres	Semi- finalist	Frank Shore	None held	Unknown; 4-9, semifinal 5	Did not advance
Men's 20 kilometres	Semi- finalist	Floris Venter	None held	32:34.4; 3rd, semifinal 2	Did not advance
Men's 20 kilometres	Semi- finalist	Thomas Passmore	None held	32:39.4; 3rd, semifinal 4	Did not advance
Men's 20 kilometres	Semi- finalist	Frank Shore	None held	33:40.0; 2nd, semifinal 3	Did not advance
Men's 100 kilometres	—	Thomas Passmore	None held	Did not finish —, semifinal 2	Did not advance
Men's sprint	Semi- finalist	Floris Venter	1:33.2; 1st, heat 2	Unknown; 3rd, semifinal 1	Did not advance
Men's sprint	Heats	Philipus Frylink	Unknown; 2nd, heat 8	Did not advance	
Men's sprint	—	Frank Shore	Time limit exceeded —, heat 16	Did not advance	
Men's tandem	Heats	Philipus Frylink; Floris Venter	Unknown; 2nd, heat 5	Did not finish	

=== Fencing ===
Event	Place	Fencer	First round	Second round	Semi- final	Final
Men's épée	First round	Walter Gates	3-5 (6th in B)	Did not advance		
Men's sabre	First round	Walter Gates	0-5 (6th in H)	Did not advance		

=== Tennis ===
Event	Place	Name	Round of 64	Round of 32	Round of 16	Quarter- finals	Semi- finals	Final
Men's singles	4th	John Richardson	Bye	Bye	Defeated Foulkes	Defeated Brown	Lost to Froitzheim	Did not advance
Men's singles	16th	Vincent Gauntlett	Bye	Lost to Ritchie	Did not advance			
Men's singles	16th	Harold Kitson	Bye	Lost to Caridia	Did not advance			
Men's doubles	4th	Vincent Gauntlett; Harold Kitson	None held	Bye	Defeated; Hykš/Slíva	Defeated; Froitzheim/Schomburgk	Lost to Cazalet/Dixon	Did not advance

Opponent nation	Wins	Losses	Percent
Bohemia	1	0	1.000
Canada	2	0	1.000
Germany	1	1	.500
Great Britain	0	3	.000
Total	4	4	.500
