= Edward Piercy =

British cyclist (1882–1968)

Personal information
- Born: 26 December 1882 Southwark, London, England
- Died: 3 January 1968 (aged 85) Surrey, England

Cycling career
- Sport: Cycling

Edward Piercy (26 December 1882 – 3 January 1968) was a British cyclist. He competed in the tandem event at the 1908 Summer Olympics.
