= Aston Manor =

Former local government district in England

Coordinates: 52.50°N 1.89°W

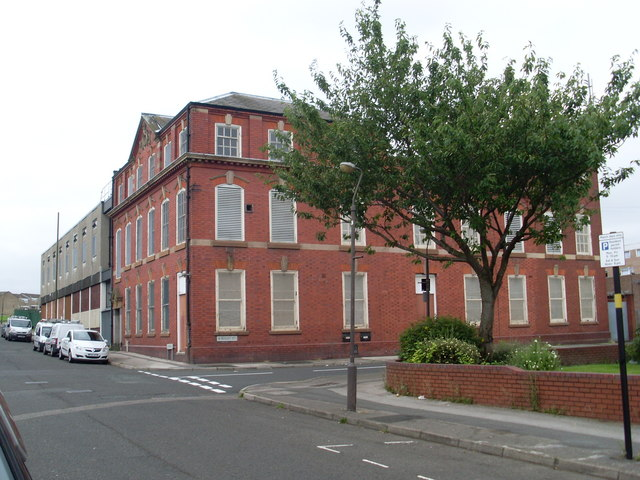
- Population
  - 1901: 77,326
  - 1911: 75,029
- History
  - Created: 1869
  - Abolished: 1911
  - Succeeded by: County Borough of Birmingham
- Status: Local board of health 1869–1903; Urban district 1894–1903; Municipal borough 1903–1911
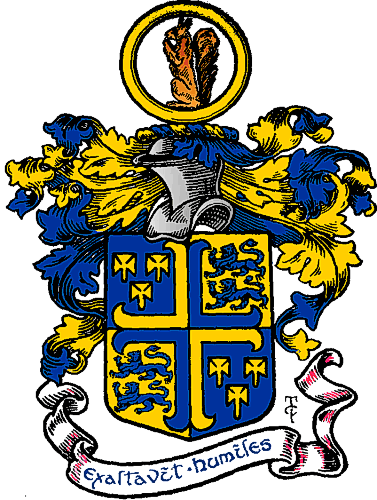

Aston Manor was a local government district of Warwickshire, England in what is now northern Birmingham, in the West Midlands, from the 19th century to 1911, when it was added to Birmingham.

The Aston Manor Local Board of Health was formed in 1869, from part of the ancient parish of Aston. It became an urban sanitary district in 1875, and then under the Local Government Act 1894 became an urban district with a directly elected council. Aston Manor covered the area today known as Aston, including Aston Park, along with Lozells. It contained only the parish of Aston Manor which was formed on 31 December. It was immediately to the north of the county borough of Birmingham. There were extensive manufacturing facilities, including those of motors and cycles with their accessories, also paper-mills, breweries, etc. The population then was largely industrial. The district contained the now publicly owned Aston Hall.

Aston Manor was granted a charter of incorporation to become a municipal borough in 1903. The census of 1911 recorded a population of 75,029 in the borough, enough for it to become a county borough in its own right. It instead was added to the county borough of Birmingham on 9 November that year. On 1 April 1912 the parish was abolished and merged with Birmingham.

== Notable people ==
- Victor Johnson (1883–1951) was a track cycling racer who, in 1908, won a gold medal at the Olympics. He became World Amateur Sprint Champion in Germany and the British National Quarter-mile Champion.

== See also ==
- Aston Hall
- Aston Lower Grounds
