= Sydney Bailey =

British cyclist

Personal information
- Full name: Sydney Bailey
- Born: 16 April 1884
- Died: 19 July 1967 (aged 83)

Cycling career
- Sport: Cycling

Sydney Bailey (16 April 1884 – 19 July 1967) was a British cyclist. He competed in the 100km event at the 1908 Summer Olympics.
