= Jack Bishop (cyclist) =

British cyclist

Personal information
- Full name: John H. Bishop
- Born: 3 September 1877
- Died: 8 July 1959 (aged 81)

Cycling career
- Sport: Cycling

John H. Bishop (3 September 1877 – 8 July 1959) was a British cyclist. He competed in the 100 km event at the 1908 Summer Olympics.
