= Harry Mussen =

British cyclist

Personal information
- Full name: Harry Mussen
- Born: 4 February 1876 Dunmurry, County Antrim
- Died: 6 February 1952 (aged 76)

Cycling career
- Sport: Cycling

Harry Mussen (4 February 1876 – 8 February 1952) was an Irish cyclist. He competed in the 100km event at the 1908 Summer Olympics for Great Britain.
