= André Lapize =

French cyclist

Personal information
- Full name: André Lapize

Cycling career
- Sport: Cycling

André Lapize was a French cyclist. He competed in the 20km event at the 1908 Summer Olympics.
