= Albert Denny =

British cyclist

Personal information
- Born: 3 January 1886
- Died: 1965 (aged 78–79)

Cycling career
- Sport: Cycling

Albert Denny (3 January 1886 – 1965) was a British cyclist. He competed in two events at cycling at the 1908 Summer Olympics: the men's sprint and the men's 20 kilometres.
