= Victor Johnson (cyclist) =

English cyclist

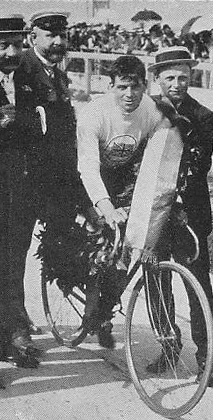

Personal information
- Full name: Victor Louis Johnson
- Nickname: Vic
- Born: 10 May 1883 Aston Manor, Warwickshire
- Died: 23 June 1951 (aged 68) Sutton Coldfield

Cycling career
- Sport: Cycling
- Discipline: Track
- Role: Rider

Major wins
- 1908 - 60 victories including : 1908 - British National quarter-mile champion. 1908 - World amateur sprint champion 1908 - Olympic 660 yards champion 1909 - world record quarter-mile, (28 secs); 1909 - world record three-quarter mile 1909 - world record one mile. 1910 - British National one-mile champion. 1911 - British National quarter-mile champion. 1911 - British National one-mile champion. 1911 - British National five-mile champion. 1912 - British National quarter-mile champion.
Medal record
Men's track cycling
Representing Great Britain
Olympic Games
Gold medal – first place	1908 London	660 yards

Victor Louis Johnson, Vic Johnson, (10 May 1883 – 23 June 1951) was a British track cycling racer who, in 1908, won a gold medal at the 1908 Summer Olympics; became 'World Amateur Sprint Champion' and the 'British National Quarter-mile Champion'.

In September 1909, he set three world records at Herne Hill Velodrome, London, for quarter-mile, three-quarter mile, and one mile. His quarter-mile time (28 seconds) stood as the world record for 21 years and the British amateur record for 'at least 39 years'.

His lifetime achievements were celebrated in 1948 when Cycling Weekly awarded him his own page in the Golden Book of Cycling, which is now held in 'The Pedal Club' archive.

== Personal life ==
Johnson was born at Aston Manor, Warwickshire

During the 1901 census, Johnson lived at 22 Station Road, Erdington, Warwickshire, where his occupation was listed as carpenter; his father, John Thomas Johnson, was a bicycle maker. His father had been a cyclist himself and was one of the participants in the first road race in history from Paris to Rouen in France in 1869, in which he finished eighth.

== Career ==
Vic Johnson started cycle racing in 1902 when he joined the 'Rover Racing C.C.

1908 was his break-through year when he won 60 races, including the National Cyclists' Union (N.C.U.) British National quarter-mile title; the World's Amateur Sprint championship in Leipzig Germany; and the Olympic Games 660 yards sprint in London, completing a single lap of the track in 51.2 seconds. He also reached the final of the Olympic Games 1,000 metre sprint but suffered a puncture and was narrowly beaten into the silver medal position, but the race was declared void when the time limit was exceeded. Johnson rode a 'Rover Path Racer' and the 'very cycle that took him to victory' is on display in the Heritage Cycling Museum at the Heritage Motor Centre in Gaydon, Warwickshire.

In September 1909, he set three world records at Herne Hill Velodrome, London - the unpaced standing-start quarter-mile, three-quarter mile, and one mile. The '28 seconds' quarter mile time stood as the world record for 21 years and as the British amateur record for 'at least 39 years'. It only lost its world status when the Union Cycliste Internationale (U.C.I.) changed the rules in 1948, and it was superseded by a slower time.

Johnson won the National Cyclists' Union (N.C.U.) quarter-mile championships in 1908, 1911 and 1912. He also won the one-mile championship in 1910 and 1911 and the five-mile championship in 1911.

== The Golden Book ==
Vic Johnson's achievements were celebrated in 1948 when Cycling Weekly awarded him his own page in the Golden Book of Cycling.
