= Charles Henry Bartlett (cyclist) =

British cyclist

Charles Bartlett
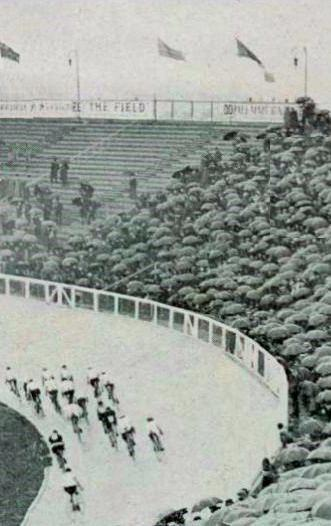

Personal information
- Full name: Charles Henry Bartlett
- Born: 6 February 1885 Bermondsey, London
- Died: 30 November 1968 (aged 83) Enfield

Cycling career
- Sport: Cycling
Medal record
Men's track cycling
Representing Great Britain
Olympic Games
Gold medal – first place	1908 London	100 kilometres

Charles Henry Bartlett (6 February 1885, in Bermondsey, London – 30 November 1968, in Enfield) was a British track cyclist. He competed in the 1908 Summer Olympics where he won the gold medal in the 100 kilometres competition, completing the course in a time of 2 hours 41 minutes and 48.6 seconds.
