= Rudolf Katzer =

German cyclist

Personal information
- Full name: Rudolf Katzer
- Born: 1888
- Died: Unknown

Cycling career
- Sport: Cycling
- Discipline: Track
- Role: Rider
Medal record
Representing Germany
Men's track cycling
Olympic Games
Silver medal – second place	1908 London	team pursuit

Rudolf Katzer (born 1888, date of death unknown) was a German track cycling racer who competed in the 1908 Summer Olympics.

With his teammates Karl Neumer, Max Götze, and Hermann Martens, he won the silver medal in the team pursuit. He also competed in the 660 yards sprint, in the 5000 metres race, and in the 20 kilometres race, but each time he was eliminated in the first round. He also participated in the 100 kilometres race but was not able to finish the race.
