= Battista Parini =

Italian cyclist

Personal information
- Full name: Battista Parini

Cycling career
- Sport: Cycling

Battista Parini was an Italian cyclist. He competed in the 100km event at the 1908 Summer Olympics.
