= Paul Fischer (sportsman) =

German sportsman

- Born: 1881

Gymnastics career
- Discipline: Men's artistic gymnastics
- Country represented: Germany
- Gym: Turnerschaft Berge Forst

Paul Fischer (born 1881, date of death unknown) was a German athlete and gymnast. He competed at the 1908 Summer Olympics in London.

In the 100 metres, Fischer did not finish his first round heat. He also participated in the gymnastics all-around competition but his result is unknown.

== Sources ==
- Cook, Theodore Andrea (1908). The Fourth Olympiad, Being the Official Report. London: British Olympic Association.
- De Wael, Herman (2001). "Athletics 1908". Herman's Full Olympians. Archived from the original on 27 September 2006.
- Wudarski, Pawel (1999). "Wyniki Igrzysk Olimpijskich" (in Polish).
