= William Isaacs =

British cyclist (1884–1955)

Personal information
- Full name: William Henry Tuckwell Isaacs
- Born: 4 March 1884 Fulham, London, England
- Died: 6 May 1955 (aged 71) Chichester, England

Cycling career
- Sport: Cycling
Medal record
Men's cycling
Representing Great Britain
Olympic Games
Bronze medal – third place	1908 London	Tandem

William Henry Tuckwell Isaacs (4 March 1884 – 6 May 1955) was a British cyclist. He won a bronze medal in the men's 2000 metres tandem event, with Charlie Brooks, at the 1908 Summer Olympics.
