= Joseph Werbrouck =

Belgian cyclist

Personal information
- Born: 10 January 1882
- Died: 3 June 1974 (aged 92)

Cycling career
- Sport: Cycling
- Discipline: Track
Medal record
Representing Belgium
Men's track cycling
Olympic Games
| Bronze medal – third place | 1908 London | 20 kilometres |

Joseph Werbrouck (10 January 1882 – 3 June 1974) was a Belgian track cyclist who competed in the 1908 Summer Olympics. In 1908 he won the bronze medal in the 20 kilometres competition. He also competed in the 660 yards event but was eliminated in the first round.
