= Charles Denny (cyclist) =

British cyclist (1886–1971)

Personal information
- Full name: Charles A. Denny
- Born: 17 March 1886
- Died: 8 January 1971 (aged 84)

Cycling career
- Sport: Cycling
Medal record
Men's cycling
Representing Great Britain
Olympic Games
Silver medal – second place	1908 London	100km

Charles A. Denny (17 March 1886 – 8 January 1971) was a British cyclist who set multiple local, national and world records. He won a silver medal in the 100km event at the 1908 Summer Olympics. Charlie Denny was a member of London Clarion Cycle Club as reported in the Clarion newspaper in July 1908, his father helped created the London Clarion Cycle Club in 1895. https://www.londonclarion.org.uk/charlie-denny

== See also ==
- Arthur J. Denny
