= Maurice Schilles =

French cyclist

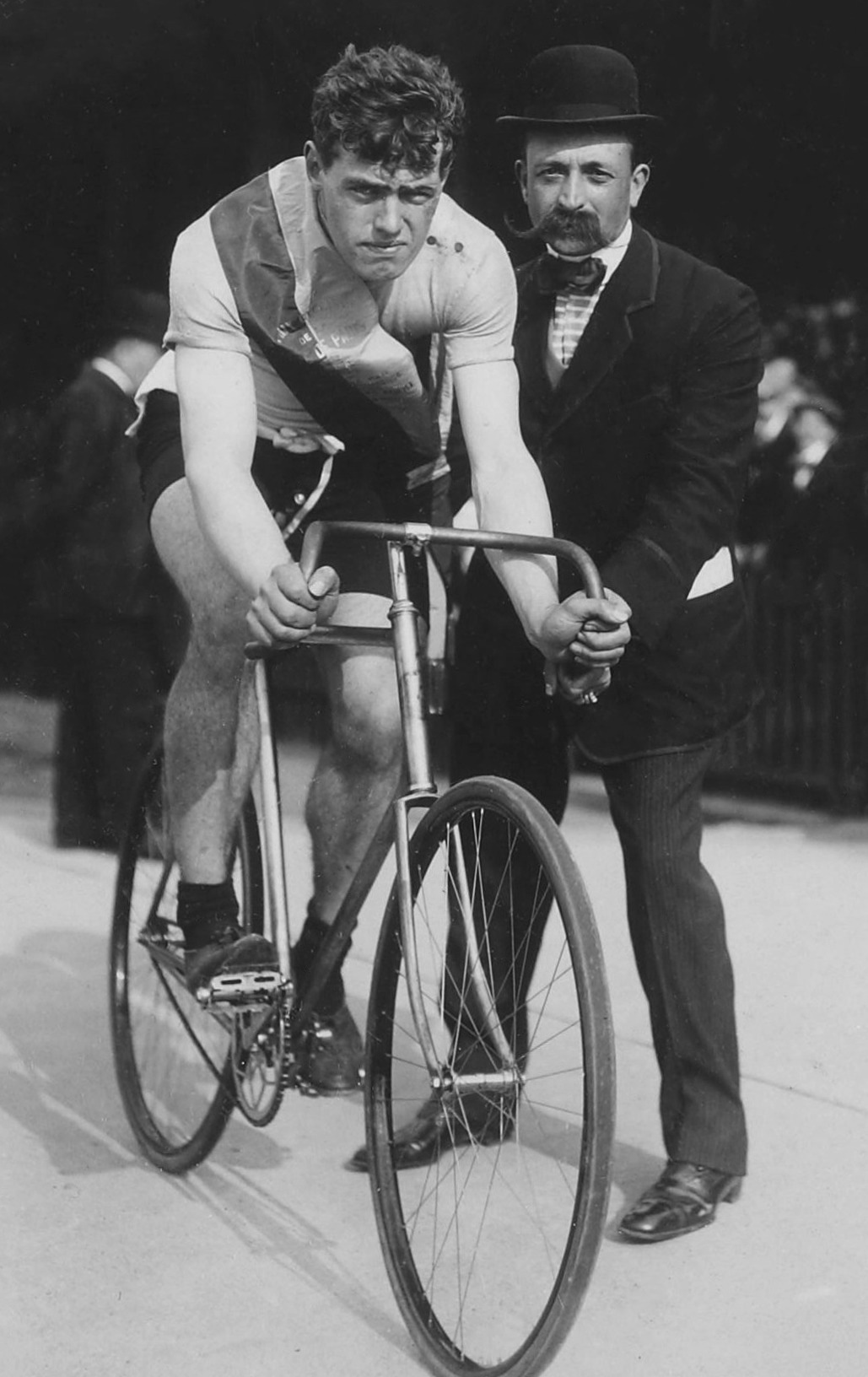
- Schilles in 1909

Personal information
- Born: 25 February 1888 Puteaux, France
- Died: 20 December 1957 (aged 69) Paris, France
- Height: 188 cm (6 ft 2 in)
- Weight: 83 kg (183 lb)

Sport
- Sport: Track cycling
- Club: CASG Paris
Medal record
Representing France
Olympic Games
Gold medal – first place	1908 London	Tandem
Silver medal – second place	1908 London	5000 m
UCI Track Cycling World Championships
Bronze medal – third place	1909 Copenhagen	Sprint, amateur
Bronze medal – third place	1924 Paris	Sprint, professional
Silver medal – second place	1925 Amsterdam	Sprint, professional

Maurice Auguste Schilles (25 February 1888 – 20 December 1957) was a French track cyclist. At the 1908 Olympics he won a gold medal in the tandem, together with André Auffray, and a silver in the 5000 m event. He also competed in the sprint; in the final, the time limit was exceeded, resulting in the race being declared void and no medals being awarded. According to the official report, he won the race by inches. In the 660 yards event, he was eliminated in the first round. In the team pursuit competition, he was a member of the French team that was eliminated in the first round.

Schilles was a mechanic who built lightweight bikes. He started racing in 1905, mostly in the sprint, and in 1907 won his first Paris championship. In 1909, he won a bronze medal at the World Championships. He raced professionally in 1919–1928 and won the national sprint title in 1923 and two medals at the world championships in 1924 and 1925. Besides cycling, he competed nationally in swimming, boxing and running.
