= Guglielmo Morisetti =

Italian cyclist

Personal information
- Born: 9 October 1882 Ghiffa, Italy
- Died: 25 November 1967 (aged 85)

Cycling career
- Sport: Cycling

Guglielmo Morisetti (9 October 1882 – 25 November 1967) was an Italian cyclist. He competed in three events at the 1908 Summer Olympics. In the semi-final of the 1,000 metres (1,100 yd) Match Sprint event, Morisetti placed two bike lengths behind heat 4 winner, Clarence Kingsbury, so did not advance to the final. In the 5,000 metres (5,500 yd) event, Morisetti placed third in heat one of open qualifying, and did not advance to the final. In the 20,000 metres (22,000 yd) event, Morisetti placed fourth in his qualifying heat, behind Arthur J. Denny (first), Charles Avrillon (second), and Gustaf Westerberg; only Denny advanced to the event final.
