= Charlie Brooks (cyclist) =

British cyclist (1881–1937)

Personal information
- Full name: Charles David Brooks
- Born: 1881
- Died: 7 February 1937 (aged 55–56)

Cycling career
- Sport: Cycling
Medal record
Men's cycling
Representing Great Britain
Olympic Games
Bronze medal – third place	1908 London	Tandem

Charles David Brooks (1881 – 7 February 1937) was a British cyclist. He competed in two events at the 1908 Summer Olympics. He won a bronze medal in the men's 2000 metres tandem, with William Isaacs.
