= John Norman (cyclist) =

British cyclist

Personal information
- Full name: John Norman
- Born: 20 April 1883 New Brighton, England
- Died: 9 August 1916 (aged 33) Somme, France

Cycling career
- Sport: Cycling

John Norman (20 April 1883 – 9 August 1916) was a British cyclist. He competed in two events at the 1908 Summer Olympics.

== Personal life ==
Norman served as a serjeant in the King's Regiment (Liverpool) during the First World War and was killed in action on 9 August 1916. He is commemorated on the Thiepval Memorial.
