= Joe Lavery =

British cyclist

Personal information
- Full name: Joseph L. Lavery
- Born: Belfast, Ireland
- Died: 3 June 1915 Belfast, Northern Ireland

Cycling career
- Sport: Cycling

Joe Lavery (died 3 June 1915) was an Irish sportman who competed in many events, most notably as a cyclist. He competed in three events at the 1908 Summer Olympics.

== Cycling career ==
Lavery first gained recognition for his cycling in Ireland in 1905, quickly becoming known as the fastest short distance bikers in the country. In 1906, he proved that the title was warranted by beating English cyclist Ben Jones over one mile, as well as taking the Irish one-mile title that same year. He took the Irish quarter-mile title in 1908 and competed in the Sprint and 5000 metre events in the 1908 Summer Olympics before retiring from cycling at the end of that season. He also set many Irish tandem and speed records during the course of his career.

== Death ==
On April 26, 1915, Lavery was driving a motorcycle and sidecar in Belfast when he was involved in an accident with a horse-drawn carriage. He died 8 days later, on June 3.
