= Thomas Matthews (cyclist) =

British cyclist

Personal information
- Born: 16 August 1884 Kensington, London, England
- Died: 20 October 1969 (aged 85)

Cycling career
- Sport: Cycling
Medal record
Representing United Kingdom
Men's cycling
Olympic Games
Gold medal – first place	Athens 1906	Tandem Sprint

Thomas Matthews (16 August 1884 – 20 October 1969) was a British cyclist. He won a gold medal at the 1906 Intercalated Games and competed in two events at the 1908 Summer Olympics.
