= Jules Patou =

Belgian cyclist

Personal information
- Born: 28 December 1878 Brussels, Belgium
- Died: 1915 (aged 36–37)

Cycling career
- Sport: Cycling

Jules Patou (28 December 1878 – 1915) was a Belgian cyclist. He competed at the 1908 and 1912 Summer Olympics.
