= Frederick Hamlin =

British cyclist

Personal information
- Full name: Frederick George Hamlin
- Born: 18 April 1881 Barking, Essex, England
- Died: 7 April 1951 (aged 69) Surrey, England

Cycling career
- Sport: Cycling
Medal record
Men's cycling
Representing Great Britain
Olympic Games
Silver medal – second place	1908 London	Tandem

Frederick George Hamlin (18 April 1881 – 7 April 1951) was a British cyclist. He competed in two events at the 1908 Summer Olympics. He won a silver medal in the men's tandem.
