= Guglielmo Malatesta =

Italian cyclist

Personal information
- Born: 6 December 1891 Ravenna, Italy
- Died: 20 November 1920 (aged 28) Ravenna, Italy

Cycling career
- Sport: Cycling

Guglielmo Malatesta (6 December 1891 – 8 November 1920) was an Italian cyclist. He competed in three events at the 1908 Summer Olympics.
