= Clarence Kingsbury =

English cyclist (1882–1949)

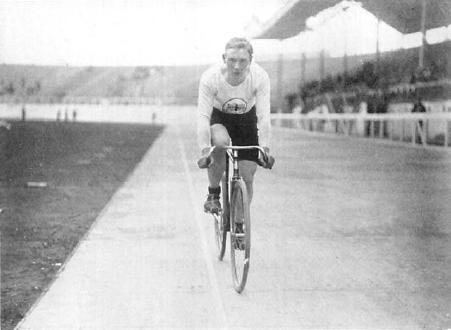
- Kingsbury in 1908

Personal information
- Full name: Clarence Brickwood Kingsbury
- Nickname: Clarrie
- Born: 3 November 1882 Portsmouth, England, United Kingdom
- Died: 4 March 1949 (aged 66) Southsea, England, Great-Britain

Cycling career
- Sport: Cycling
- Discipline: Track
- Role: Rider
- Rider type: Endurance
Medal record
Men's track cycling
Representing Great Britain
Olympic Games
Gold medal – first place	1908 London	20 kilometres
Gold medal – first place	1908 London	Team pursuit

Clarence Brickwood Kingsbury (3 November 1882 – 4 March 1949) was a British track cyclist who competed in the 1908 Summer Olympics. He belonged to the Paddington and North End cycling clubs.

== Biography ==
Kingsbury was born and died in Portsmouth, Hampshire.

He was the son of Martha Brickwood (née White) and William Salter Kingsbury. His mother, Martha, was previously married to Thomas Brickwood of Brickwoods Brewery. In 1904, he married Maud Jennings.

In 1908 he won the gold medal in the 20 kilometres competition as well as in the team pursuit as member of the British team.

He finished fifth in the 5000 metres competition and was eliminated in the semi-finals of the 660 yards event. In the sprint event, he participated in the final when the time limit was exceeded, resulting in the race being declared void and no medals being awarded.

== Golden Book of Cycling ==
He was given his own entry in the Golden Book of Cycling.

Kingsbury was living at 41 Queens Road, Portsmouth, Hampshire, during the 1901 census, his occupation listed as 'cycle agent'. When Kingsbury died, he lived at 4 Nightingale Road, Southsea.
