= Dorus Nijland =

Dutch cyclist (1880–1968)

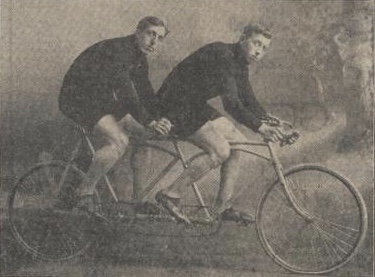
- Nijland (left) together with Ko Bunt (c. 1910)

Personal information
- Full name: Dorotheus Magdalenus Nijland
- Born: 26 February 1880 Amsterdam, Netherlands
- Died: 13 December 1968 (aged 88) Amsterdam, Netherlands

Cycling career
- Sport: Cycling
- Rider type: sprinter

Amateur team
- 1905–1913: no team

Professional team
- 1913–1915: no team

Dorotheus Magdalenus "Dorus" Nijland (26 February 1880 – 13 December 1968) was a Dutch track and road racing cyclist. Nijland was a sprinter. He was an amateur cyclist and later Nijland became a professional cyclist (1913–1915) and continued cycling as a master. His total career was between 1905 and 1935. He won over a hundred prizes, and competed at the 1908 Summer Olympics.

== Career ==
Nijland competed mainly on the defunct track "Zeeburgerbaan" in Amsterdam. He finished eleven times 2nd at the Dutch National Track Championships. In the early years of his career his finished behind Jan Tulleken from Haarlem. After Tulleken became a professional cyclist, he finished second behind Bosch van Drakestein. As second places became kind of an obsession during his career, he got the nickname “pechkampioen” (translated: bad luck champion). He competed at the 1907 Grand Prix in Antwerp, an international race in Belgium. He reached the finals, but finished second behind Belgian cyclist Van Moll. Nijland was invited for the Grand Prix of Brussels; again he finished second. It was approved by the Dutch national cycling union that Nijlamd and Jan Tulleken competed at the 1907 UCI Track Cycling World Championships in Paris. In the amateur sprint event he finished at the bottom of the ranking. He competed in six events at the 1908 Summer Olympics in London. In the team pursuit event, after having a bye in the heats. In the semi-final they started too fast and Nijland fell and so they finished fourth. At the 1910 UCI Track Cycling World Championships he would have won his heat of Frenchman Paul Texier (who won the bronze medal), but the officials named Texier as the winner. Around 1910, he won on the tandem with partner Ko Brunt many competitions in Europe.

After his career he stayed active in the cycling sport. On his 75th birthday in 1955, he was honored with an article about his career in De Volkskrant.

== See also ==
- List of Dutch Olympic cyclists
