= André Auffray =

French cyclist (1884–1953)

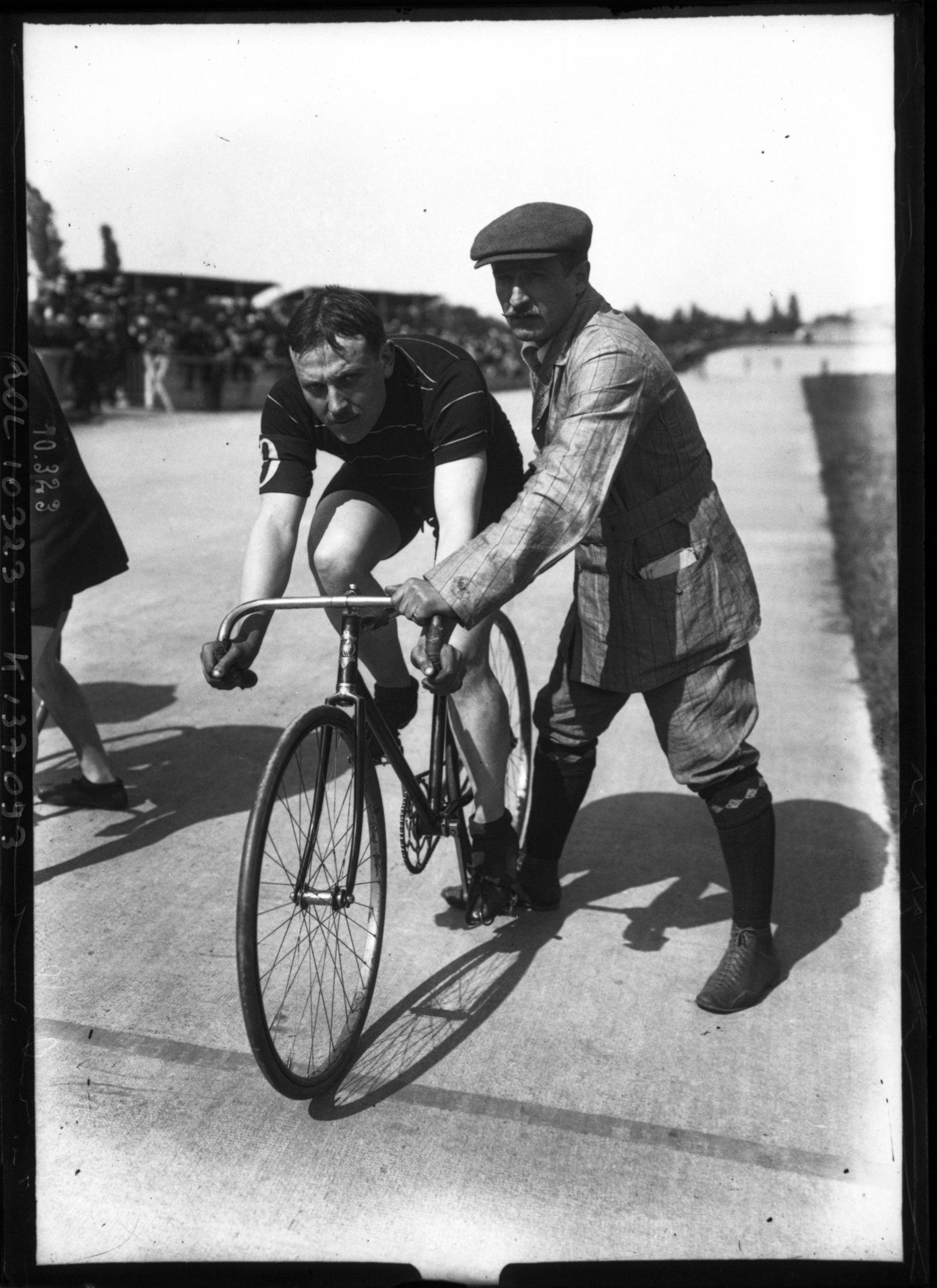
- Auffray at the 1910 Bordeaux-Paris race

Personal information
- Born: 2 September 1884 Saumur, France
- Died: 3 November 1953 (aged 69) Paris, France

Sport
- Sport: Track cycling
- Club: Velo Club de Levallois, Levallois-Perret
Medal record
Representing France
Olympic Games
Gold medal – first place	1908 London	Tandem
Bronze medal – third place	1908 London	5000 m
UCI Track Cycling World Championships
Silver medal – second place	1907 Paris	Sprint, amateur

André Auffray (born Alexandre Offray; 2 September 1884 – 3 November 1953) was a French racing cyclist. At the 1908 Olympics he won a gold medal in the tandem, together with Maurice Schilles, and a bronze in the 5000 m event; he also competed in the individual sprint and in the 1,980 yard team pursuit. In sprint events, he won the Paris championships in 1907, placing third in 1908 and 1909, and placed second at the world championships.
