= Max Triebsch =

German cyclist (born 1885)

Personal information
- Born: 22 July 1885

Cycling career
- Sport: Cycling

Max Triebsch (born 22 July 1885) was a German cyclist. He competed in three events at the 1908 Summer Olympics.
