= Antonie Gerrits =

Dutch cyclist

Personal information
- Born: 15 May 1885 Amsterdam, Netherlands
- Died: 22 January 1969 (aged 83) Amsterdam, Netherlands

Cycling career
- Sport: Cycling

Antonie Gerrits (15 May 1885 – 22 January 1969) was a Dutch cyclist. He competed in four events at the 1908 Summer Olympics.

== See also ==
- List of Dutch Olympic cyclists
