= Émile Demangel =

French cyclist

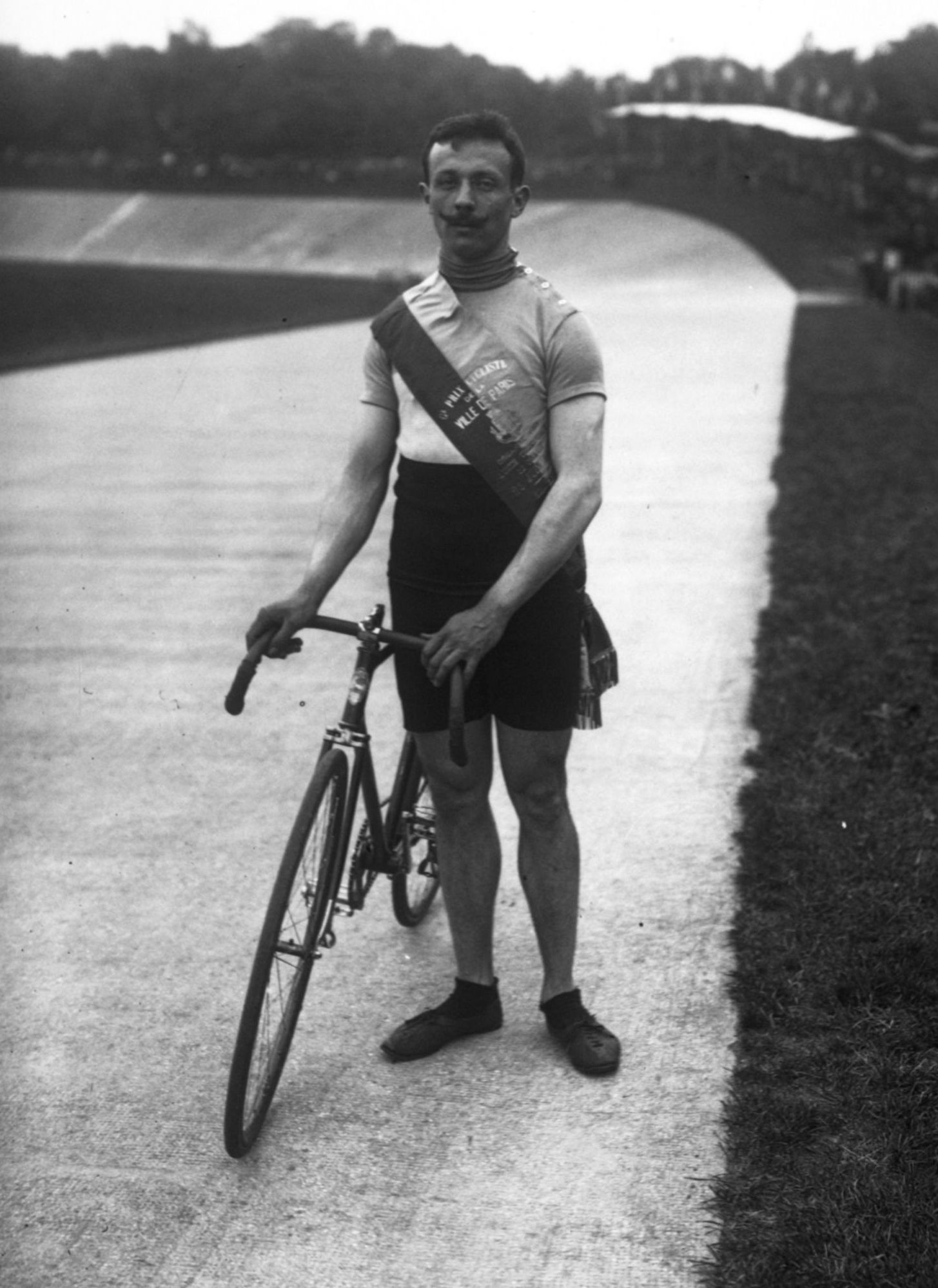
- Demangel in 1908

Personal information
- Born: 20 June 1882 La Chapelle-aux-Bois, France
- Died: 11 October 1968 (aged 86) Xertigny, France
- Height: 173 cm (5 ft 8 in)
- Weight: 64 kg (141 lb)

Cycling career
- Sport: Cycling
- Discipline: Track
- Role: Rider
Medal record
Representing France
Men's track cycling
Olympic Games
Silver medal – second place	1908 London	660 yards
UCI Track Cycling World Championships
Bronze medal – third place	1908 Berlin	Sprint

Émile Joseph Demangel (20 June 1882 – 11 October 1968) was a French amateur track cyclist who competed in several sprint events at the 1906 Intercalated Games and 1908 Summer Olympics. In 1906, he finished fourth in the 5,000 m and 333⅓ m time trial events. At the 1908 Games, he served as the flag bearer for the French delegation, won a silver medal in the 660 yards sprint, and placed fifth in the 1,980 yards team pursuit. The same year, he set a world record in the paced 500 metre time trial and won a bronze medal in the sprint at the world championships. A street in Xertigny, where he died in 1968, is named for him.
