= Benjamin Jones (cyclist) =

English cyclist

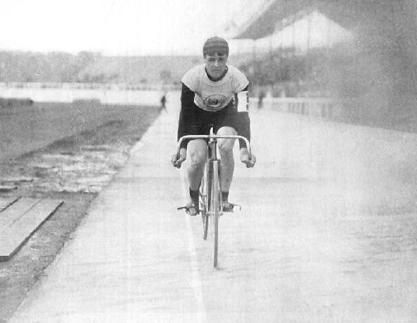
- Jones in 1908

Personal information
- Born: 2 January 1882 Leigh, Greater Manchester, Great Britain
- Died: 20 August 1963 (aged 81) Johannesburg, Gauteng, South Africa

Cycling career
- Sport: Cycling
Medal record
Men's track cycling
Representing Great Britain
Olympic Games
Gold medal – first place	1908 London	5000 metres
Gold medal – first place	1908 London	Team pursuit
Silver medal – second place	1908 London	20 kilometres

Benjamin Jones (2 January 1882 – 20 August 1963) was a British track cycling racer who competed in the 1908 Summer Olympics.

In 1907, he won the one and five mile events at the British Empire cycling championships at Newcastle. Soon after, his professional cyclist license was revoked after an altercation with another cyclist. His attendance at the 1908 Olympics was thus in question until he was finally reinstated just before the event.

In 1908, he won the gold medal in the 5000 metres competition as well as in the team pursuit as a member of the British team. He also won a silver medal in the 20 kilometres event. He competed in the 660 yards competition but was eliminated in the semi-finals. In the sprint event, he participated in the final and came second, but the pre-arranged time limit was exceeded, resulting in the race being declared void and no medals being awarded.
