= André Poulain =

French cyclist

Personal information
- Full name: André Poulain

Cycling career
- Sport: Cycling

André Poulain was a French cyclist. He competed in four events at the 1908 Summer Olympics.
