= William Anderson (cyclist) =

Canadian cyclist (1888–1928)

Personal information
- Full name: William Alexander Robertson Anderson
- Born: 6 September 1888 Toronto, Ontario, Canada
- Died: 27 September 1928 (aged 40) Boston, Massachusetts, United States

Cycling career
- Sport: Cycling
Medal record
Men's cycling
Representing Canada
Olympic Games
| Bronze medal – third place | 1908 London | Team pursuit |

William Alexander Robertson Anderson (6 September 1888 – 27 September 1928) was a Canadian cyclist. He competed in four events at the 1908 Summer Olympics. He won a bronze medal in the men's team pursuit.
