= Paul Schulze (cyclist) =

German cyclist

Personal information
- Born: 22 October 1882 Berlin, Germany
- Died: 1918 (aged 35–36)

Cycling career
- Sport: Cycling

Paul Schulze (22 October 1882 – 1918) was a German cyclist. He competed in four events at the 1908 Summer Olympics.
