= Walter Andrews (cyclist) =

Canadian cyclist (1881–1954)

Personal information
- Full name: Walter Emanuel Andrews
- Nickname: Walt
- Born: February 8, 1881 United States
- Died: March 1954 (aged 73) Pinellas County, Florida, U.S.

Cycling career
- Sport: Cycling
Medal record
Men's cycling
Representing Canada
Olympic Games
Bronze medal – third place	1908 London	Team pursuit

Walter Emanuel Andrews (February 8, 1881 – March 1954) was an American-born Canadian cyclist. He competed in six events at the 1908 Summer Olympics. He won a bronze medal in the men's team pursuit.
