= Philipus Freylinck =

South African cyclist

Personal information
- Full name: Philipus Freylinck
- Born: 9 April 1886 Graaff-Reinet, Cape Colony
- Died: 15 December 1908 (aged 22) Johannesburg, Transvaal Colony

Cycling career
- Sport: Cycling

Philipus Freylinck (9 April 1886 – 15 December 1908) was a South African cyclist. He competed in four events at the 1908 Summer Olympics. He also represented South Africa in the National Cyclists' Union Championship that summer.

Freylinck killed himself a few months after the Olympics.
