= Andrew Hansson =

Swedish cyclist

Personal information
- Born: 13 October 1882 Gothenburg, Sweden
- Died: 8 July 1964 (aged 81) Stockholm, Sweden

Cycling career
- Sport: Cycling

Andrew Hansson (13 October 1882 – 8 July 1964) was a Swedish cyclist. He competed at the 1906 and the 1908 Summer Olympics.
