= Leonard Meredith =

English cyclist

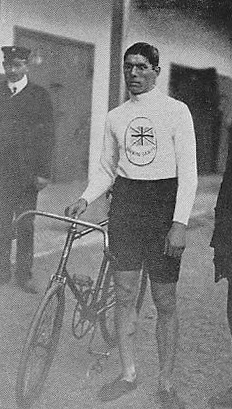

Personal information
- Full name: Leonard Lewis Meredith
- Born: 2 February 1882 St Pancras, London, United Kingdom
- Died: 27 January 1930 (aged 47) Davos, Switzerland

Cycling career
- Sport: Cycling
- Disciplines: Road and track
- Role: Rider
- Rider type: Endurance
Medal record
Representing Great Britain
Olympic Games
Men's track cycling
Gold medal – first place	1908 London	Team pursuit
Men's road bicycle racing
Silver medal – second place	1912 Stockholm	Team road race

Leonard "Leon" Lewis Meredith (2 February 1882 – 27 January 1930) was a British track and road racing cyclist who competed in the 1908 Summer Olympics, in the 1912 Summer Olympics, and in the 1920 Summer Olympics. He won seven world championships, set up one of Britain's largest cycle-parts companies, and ran a roller skating rink and ballroom.

== Background ==
Meredith was born in St Pancras, London. Sources give his name at birth as Lewis Leon Meredith. However, reports in the cycling press refer to him as Leon Lewis Meredith, and friends called him Jack.

He was a mild-looking, bespectacled man who parted his hair in the centre. Cycling said:

There was something Clark Kent, the children's comic-book hero, in the make-up of Edwardian cyclist Meredith. Like Clark Kent, he presented a mild, shy, bespectacled image off the bike, but once on the bike, he became Superman, beating all and sundry in a devastating manner.

He was born in central London. He became interested in cycling in 1901 and made his first long ride from London to Brighton, 80 km on badly surfaced roads. On the way, he met riders from Paddington Cycling Club, neighbours in the region of London where he lived, and agreed to ride with them provided they didn't go too fast. It was Meredith, however, who set the pace, and the other riders asked him to join their club. He rode his first race in the Finchley Harriers meeting on the track at Kensal Green in north London, winning the one-mile handicap. By the end of the season, he was the national tandem-paced champion over 50 miles (80 km). He finished 17 seconds outside the record and was cheered off the track.

Meredith worked for his uncle, William Boyer, a builder with a wharf on the canal in Praed Street, Paddington. Meredith cycled all over London, visiting his uncle's building sites. When Meredith showed talent at racing, his uncle subsidised him. That meant he could have a full-time trainer and a masseur and travel across Europe to meet the best opposition.

== International career ==
Meredith won his first world championship at Crystal Palace in London in 1904, beating the nine starters – four British – in the 100 km motor-paced event. He set off straight into the lead, passing five kilometres in 4m 49, 10 km in 9m 20s, 20 km in 18m 31s, and 30 km in 27m 30s. By then, he was leading by five laps. He completed 50 km in 45m 15s and 80 km in 1h 15m 5s. Then his pacing motorcycle broke down, and Meredith hit the track's banking and fell. He rolled across the track, turning somersaults. He got back to his feet, blood running, shouted for another bike and another pacer, and finished the race 7m 19s faster than the world amateur record.

He became an Olympic gold medalist in the 1908 Games, also held in London, on the 660-yard track at White City. He rode in the team pursuit with Ernie Payne, Ben Jones and Clarence Kingsbury. It was the first time the event had been held in the Olympic Games. In the tandem race, he was eliminated in the semi-final. He reached the final of the 20 km race but did not finish.

He was part of the team that won the silver medal in the Team road race. In the individual road race he finished fourth.

Eight years later, he participated in the individual road race, finishing 18th.

He won seven motor world motor-paced championships, in London in 1904, Antwerp in 1905, Paris in 1907, Leipzig in 1908, Copenhagen in 1909, Rome in 1911 and Berlin in 1913.

The world track champion, Bill Bailey, said of him:

He was one of the most versatile riders I ever saw, winning races from a quarter-mile to six hours. Usually, when thinking of motor-paced riders, we regard them as specialists who, once they have adopted the little front wheel, reversed forks and big gears are somehow never able to show good form in normal competition. Meredith was an exception. He mixed his racing most successfully and, in 1910 when he had already been world champion five times, astounded the cycling world by becoming the first rider ever to beat five hours for an unpaced out-and-home 100 [miles] on the road.

And of the world championship in Copenhagen, he said:

The championships were at Ordrup track, and we were staying at Charlottenlund by the sea and had to walk a mile or so through the forest to get to the track. We could speak no Danish, and the staff at the small pension where we were staying spoke no English. But on the day of the championships, just as we were leaving for the track, they lined up and made it known that they wanted 'tips'. We were annoyed at this, since we were not leaving for several days. Not until later did we realise the tips they wanted concerned the bike races, for the Totalisator was already a feature of Danish racing.

== Domestic career ==
Meredith was the first rider to beat five hours for a 100-mile time trial, held out-and-home. He did it on the Bath road out of London, starting in Hounslow and turning between Newbury and Hungerford. He finished in 4h 52m 52s and won a gold medal put up by the magazine Cycling. The Rover bicycle on which he rode was put on display in the Gamages department store in central London. The cycling administrator and journalist Frederick Bidlake called Meredith's ride "rather fortunate when he went for the Cycling medal to get the out-and-home '100' inside five hours at his first essay when all the other triers were finding trouble." His record was beaten by Frederick Grubb later that year with 4h 50m 49s.

In 1916, he had built enough of a fortune from the cycle industry (see below) that the British Olympic Association ruled that he should get no expenses should he be picked for the Olympic Games. The formal reason given was that he was too old and not worthy of public support. The war ended both his career and the 1916 Olympic Games.

Meredith's last races were in 1924, 22 years after he had started when he tried to break long-distance records.

Among the trophies he won was the Penrose Cup, large enough to hold eight UK gallons. Friends joked he should fill it with beer and drain it. But Meredith was teetotal and a non-smoker.

== Business career ==
In 1912, Meredith acquired the right to a patent for a racing tyre. It was unusual that whereas other racing tyres were tubular and sewn together at the base, Meredith's tyre was sewn with diagonal threads that made the inner tube accessible at the base of the tyre.

Meredith enjoyed skating and found that one of his teachers, a man called Bain, was the brother of Joseph Bain, who ran the Constrictor Tyre Company in Nursery Lane, Forest Gate, a suburb of London. Meredith was asked for financial advice and invested £100. He soon replaced the managing director, who had invented the Constrictor tyre. He began importing more cycling parts and buying Bastide bicycles from France and hubs from BSA. He branded them all Constrictor. By then, he owned a roller-skating rink in the Porchester Hall, off Queensway, London, and advertised it by breaking the national one-mile record at Holland Park rink and the five-mile record on the Maida Vale rink. He then opened another in the Broadway, Cricklewood, north London. He ran it with Bill Skuse, one of his pacers on the track. Encouraged by that, he bought a dance hall. He later planned a sporting club beside the Thames at Twickenham.

Constrictor was a pioneer in alloy cycle equipment and made a novel alloy rim called the Conloy. The firm outlasted Meredith's death but foundered at the end of the 1960s in a national decline of the cycle trade and in the face of rising imports.

== Marriage and death ==
Meredith married in 1914 Cissie Parkham, daughter of Charles Pinkham. They had a daughter, Leonie.

Meredith died six days before his 48th birthday while on a skiing holiday in Davos, Switzerland, of a heart attack. His ashes were interred at Willesden cemetery. Wreaths came from around Britain and from France and Belgium, some in the shape of bicycles.

Cissie died in a nursing home five years later.
