= Bruno Götze =

German cyclist

Personal information
- Born: 21 June 1882 Breslau, German Empire
- Died: 28 May 1913 (aged 30)

Cycling career
- Sport: Cycling
Medal record
Representing Germany
Men's cycling
Olympic Games
Silver medal – second place	Athens 1906	Tandem Sprint

Bruno Götze (21 June 1882 – 28 May 1913) was a German cyclist. He won a silver medal at the 1906 Intercalated Games and competed in four events at the 1908 Summer Olympics.
