= Alwin Boldt =

German cyclist

Personal information
- Born: 19 March 1884
- Died: 1920 (aged 35–36)

Cycling career
- Sport: Cycling

Alwin Boldt (19 March 1884 – 1920) was a German cyclist. He competed in three events at the 1908 Summer Olympics.
