= William Morton (cyclist) =

Canadian cyclist

Personal information
- Born: 20 June 1880 Hunslet, West Yorkshire, England
- Died: 21 March 1952 (aged 71) Toronto, Canada

Cycling career
- Sport: Cycling
Medal record
Men's cycling
Representing Canada
Olympic Games
Bronze medal – third place	1908 London	Team pursuit

William Morton (20 June 1880 – 21 March 1952) was a British-born Canadian cyclist. He competed in five events at the 1908 Summer Olympics. He won a bronze medal in the men's team pursuit.
