= Karl Neumer =

German cyclist (1887–1984)

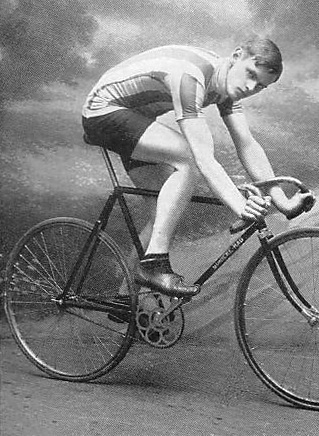
- Neumer in 1909

Personal information
- Born: 23 February 1887 Reinhardtsgrimma, German Empire
- Died: 16 May 1984 (aged 97) Pirna, East Germany

Sport
- Sport: Track cycling
- Club: RV Wanderlust 1888, Dresden
Medal record
Representing Germany
Olympic Games
Silver medal – second place	1908 London	team pursuit
Bronze medal – third place	1908 London	660 yards

Karl Neumer (23 February 1887 – 16 May 1984) was a German track cyclist. At the 1908 Olympics, he won a bronze medal in the individual sprint and a silver in the team pursuit. He also competed in the 5000 metres race, but was eliminated in the first round.

Neumer held the national sprint title in 1907–1910. In 1912, he raced professionally, but with little success. He then ran a vegetable shop in Dresden, which was destroyed by bombing in 1945. His 1908 bicycle was one of the first exhibits at the Leipzig Sports Museum. Before his death in 1984, Neumer was the oldest living German Olympic medalist.
