= Floris Venter =

South African cyclist

Personal information
- Full name: Floris Venter
- Born: 7 May 1886
- Died: Unknown

Cycling career
- Sport: Cycling

Floris Venter (born 7 May 1886, date of death unknown) was a South African cyclist. He competed in five events at the 1908 Summer Olympics.
