= Frederick McCarthy =

Canadian cyclist (1881–1974)

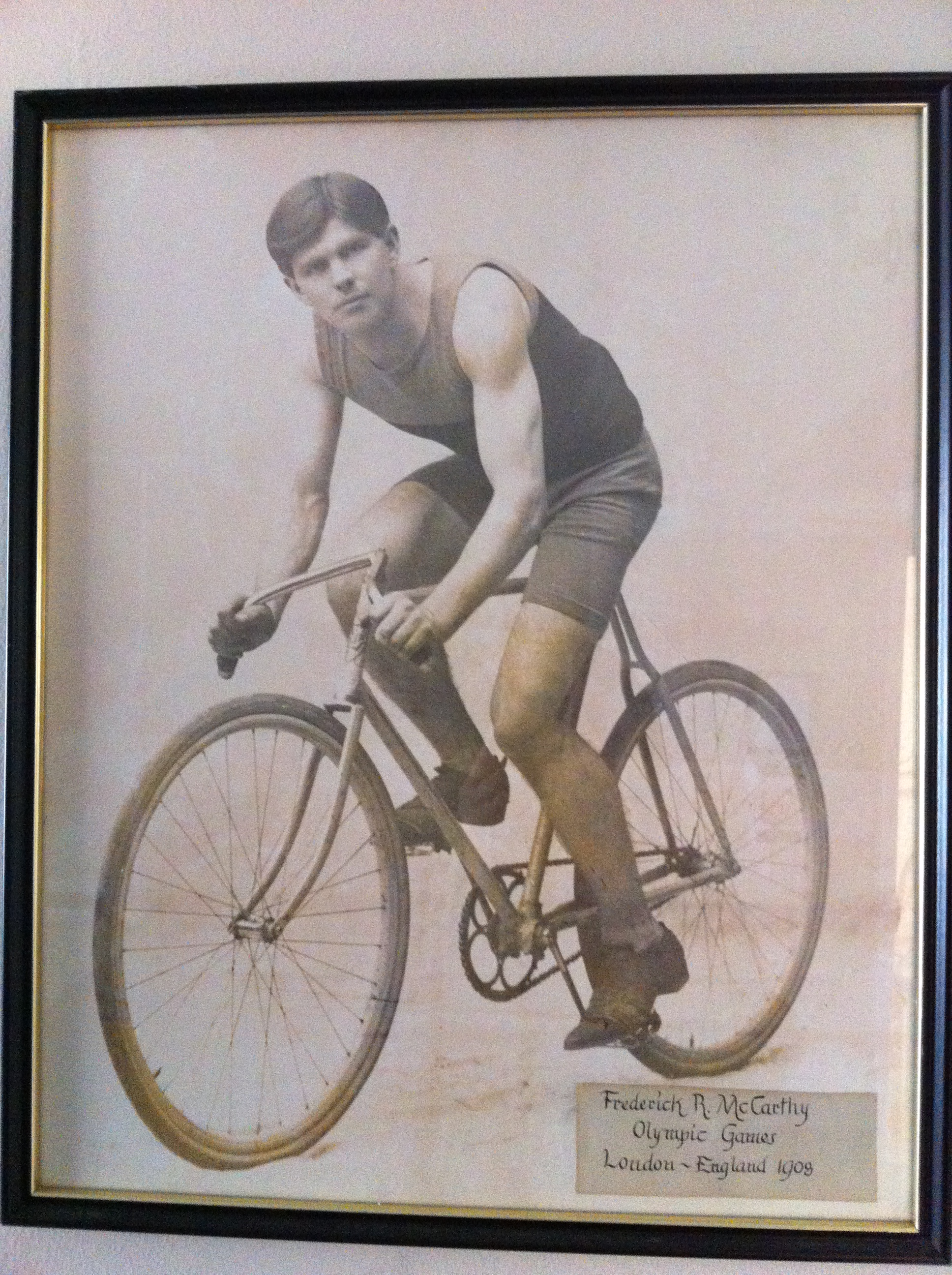
- Frederick R McCarthy 1908 Olympic Games

Personal information
- Full name: Frederick Richard McCarthy
- Born: 15 October 1881 Stratford, Ontario, Canada
- Died: 15 February 1974 (aged 92) Toronto, Ontario, Canada

Cycling career
- Sport: Cycling
Medal record
Men's cycling
Representing Canada
Olympic Games
| Bronze medal – third place | 1908 London | Team pursuit |

Frederick McCarthy (15 October 1881 – 15 February 1974) was a Canadian/American cyclist. He competed in seven events at the 1908 Summer Olympics. He won a bronze medal in the men's team pursuit. Half a year after his Olympic participation, in February 1909, he was naturalized as a United States citizen.
