= Paul Texier =

French cyclist

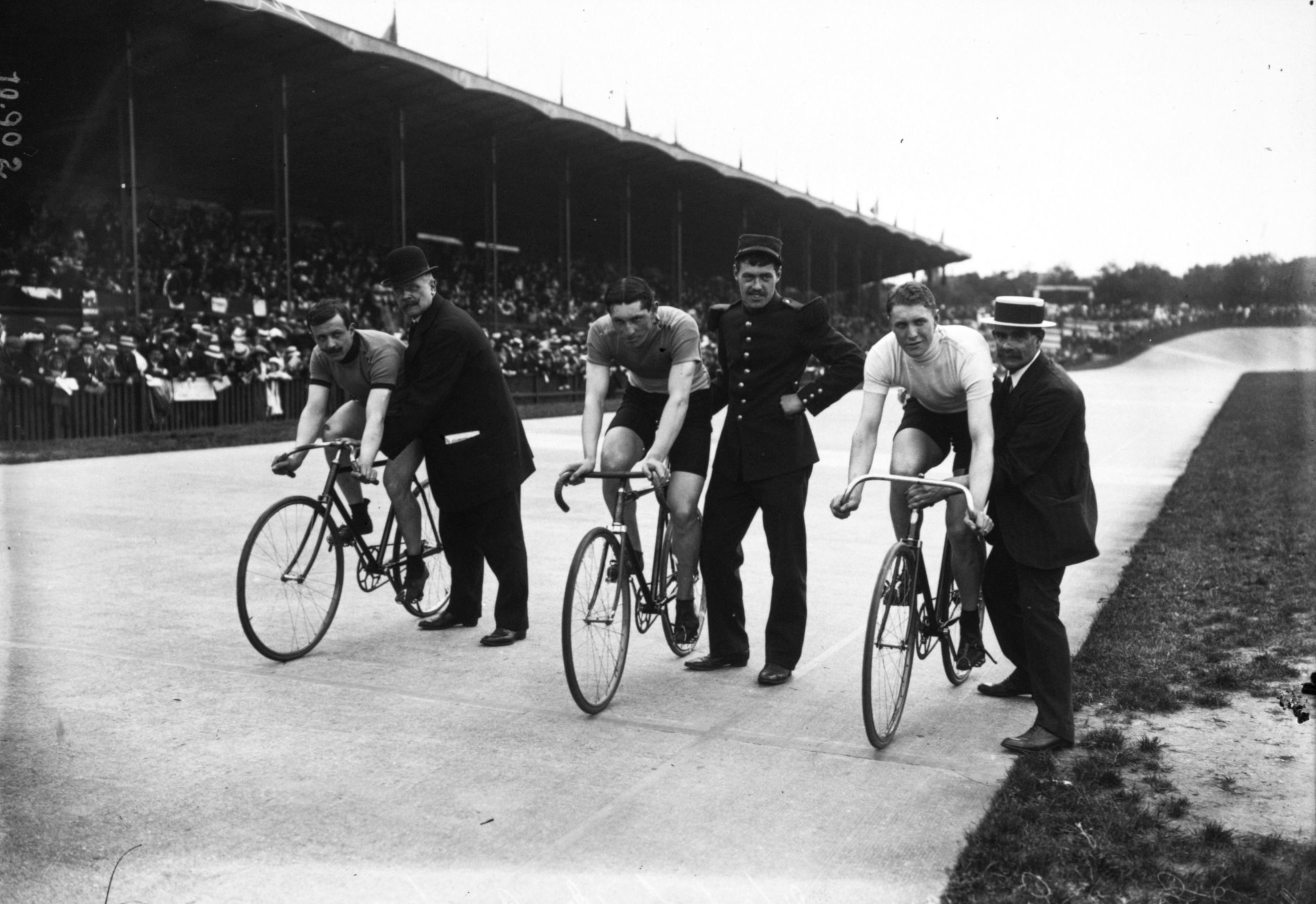

Personal information
- Full name: Paul Texier
- Born: 28 April 1889
- Died: 29 February 1972 (aged 82)

Cycling career
- Sport: Cycling

Paul Texier (28 April 1889 – 29 February 1972) was a French cyclist. He competed in six events at the 1908 Summer Olympics.
