= Gerard Bosch van Drakestein =

Dutch cyclist (1887–1972)

Jonkheer Gerard Bosch van Drakestein
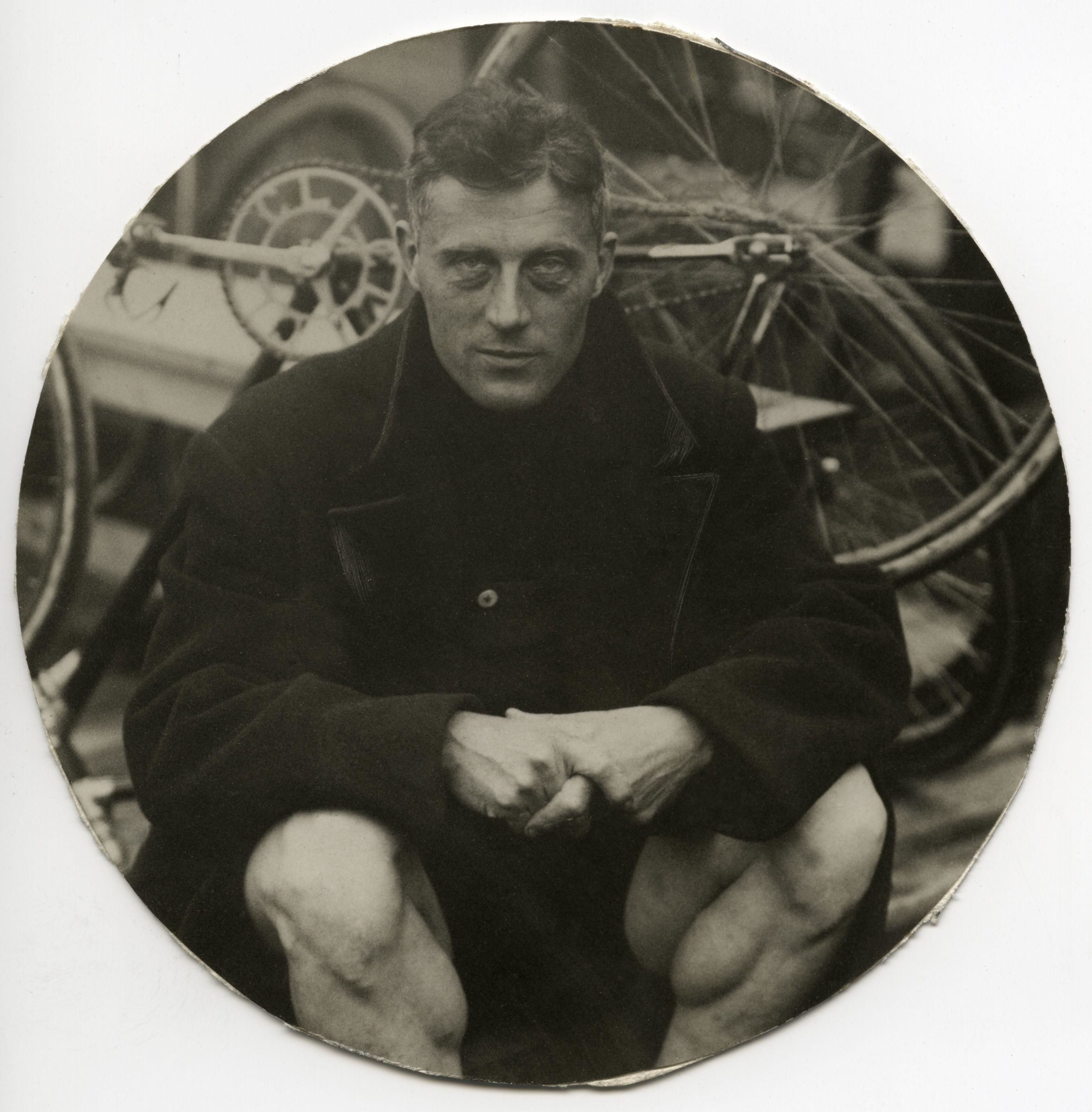
- Bosch van Drakestein in 1928

Personal information
- Born: 24 July 1887 Mechlin, Belgium
- Died: 20 March 1972 (aged 84) The Hague, Netherlands

Cycling career
- Sport: Cycling
Medal record
Representing NED
Men's cycling
Olympic Games
| Silver medal – second place | 1928 Amsterdam | 1000 m time trial |
| Silver medal – second place | 1928 Amsterdam | 4000 m team pursuit |
| Bronze medal – third place | 1924 Paris | 2000 m tandem |

Jonkheer Gerard Dagobert Hendrik Bosch van Drakestein (24 July 1887 – 20 March 1972) was a Dutch track cyclist who represented his country at three Summer Olympics (1908, 1924 and 1928). He was born in Mechelen, Belgium and died in The Hague, Netherlands.

After having won a bronze at the 1924 Summer Olympics in Paris (2000 m tandem), he won the silver medal four years later in the 1000 m individual time trial, aged 41.

== See also ==
- List of Dutch Olympic cyclists
