= List of 1908 Summer Olympics medal winners =

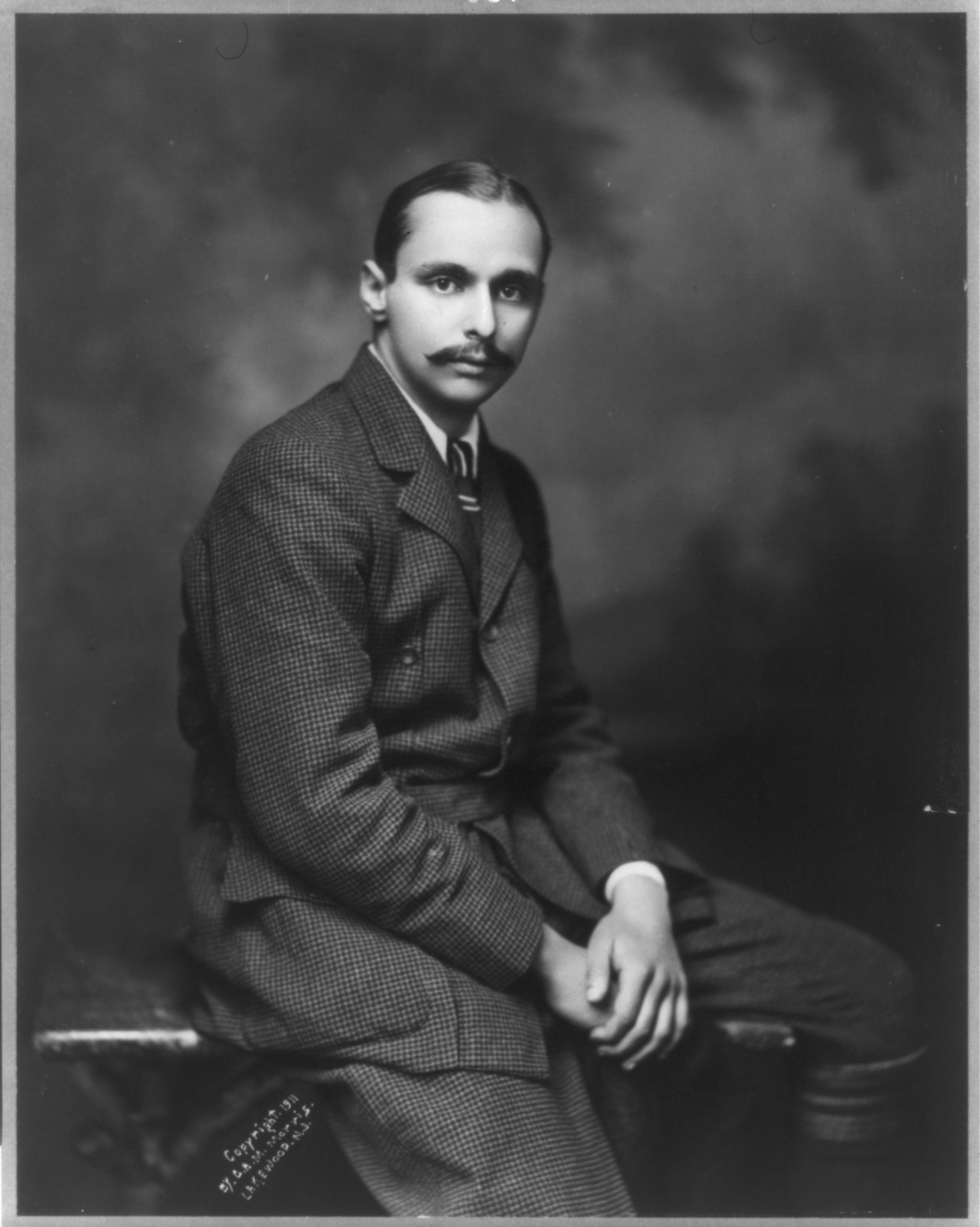
Jay Gould II won the gold medal in the Jeu de paume event, the only time this event would feature as a non-exhibition event at an Olympic games.

The 1908 Summer Olympics, officially the Games of the IV Olympiad, were an international multi-sport event which was held in 1908 in London. These games were originally scheduled to be held in Rome. At the time they were the fifth modern Olympic Games. However, the Athens Games of 1906 have since been downgraded by the International Olympic Committee and the 1908 Games are seen as the start of the Fourth Olympiad, in keeping with the now-accepted four-year cycle. Overall, 106 events in 24 disciplines were contested.

== Archery ==
Event	Gold	Silver	Bronze
Men's Continental style	Eugène Grisot; France	Louis Vernet; France	Gustave Cabaret; France
Men's double York Round	William Dod; Great Britain	Reginald Brooks-King; Great Britain	Henry Richardson; United States
Women's double National Round	Sybil Newall; Great Britain	Lottie Dod; Great Britain	Beatrice Hill-Lowe; Great Britain

== Athletics ==
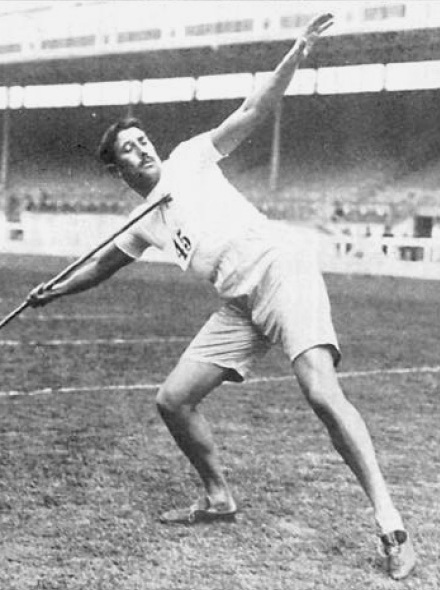
Eric Lemming, gold medallist for Sweden in freestyle javelin.

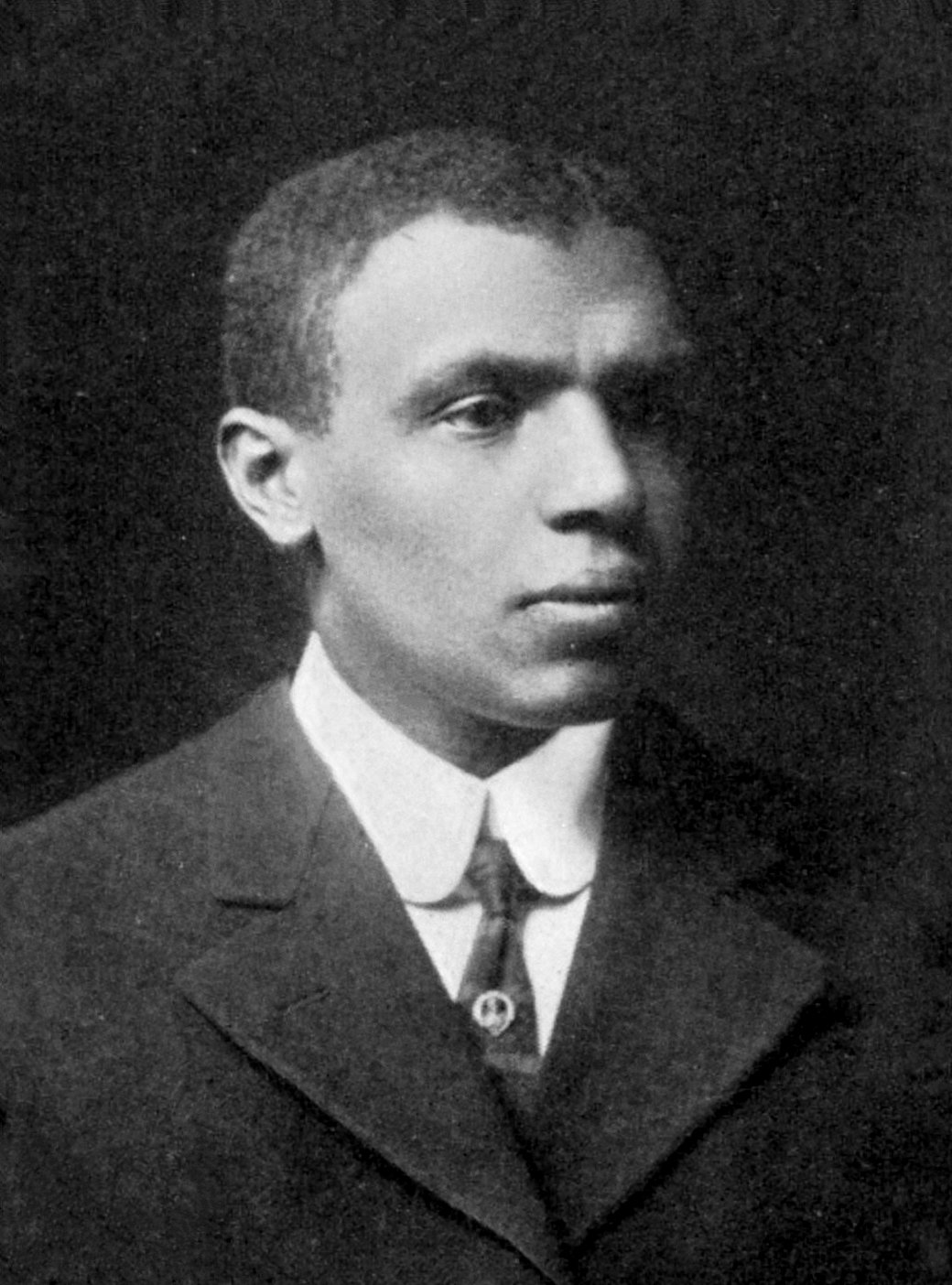
John Taylor was a member of the United States athletics team which won the medley relay.

Event	Gold	Silver	Bronze
100 metres	Reggie Walker; South Africa	James Rector; United States	Robert Kerr; Canada
200 metres	Robert Kerr; Canada	Robert Cloughen; United States	Nate Cartmell; United States
400 metres	Wyndham Halswelle; Great Britain	not awarded	not awarded
800 metres	Mel Sheppard; United States	Emilio Lunghi; Italy	Hanns Braun; Germany
1500 metres	Mel Sheppard; United States	Harold Wilson; Great Britain	Norman Hallows; Great Britain
5 miles	Emil Voigt; Great Britain	Edward Owen; Great Britain	John Svanberg; Sweden
Marathon	Johnny Hayes; United States	Charles Hefferon; South Africa	Joseph Forshaw; United States
110 metres hurdles	Forrest Smithson; United States	John Garrels; United States	Arthur Shaw; United States
400 metres hurdles	Charles Bacon; United States	Harry Hillman; United States	Jimmy Tremeer; Great Britain
3200 metres steeplechase	Arthur Russell; Great Britain	Archie Robertson; Great Britain	John Eisele; United States
Medley relay	United States; William Hamilton; Nate Cartmell; John Taylor; Mel Sheppard	Germany; Arthur Hoffmann; Hans Eicke; Otto Trieloff; Hanns Braun	Hungary; Pál Simon; Frigyes Wiesner; József Nagy; Ödön Bodor
3 miles team race	Great Britain; William Coales; Joe Deakin; Archie Robertson	United States; George Bonhag; John Eisele; Herbert Trube	France; Joseph Dreher; Louis de Fleurac; Paul Lizandier
3500 metres walk	George Larner; Great Britain	Ernest Webb; Great Britain	Harry Kerr; Australasia
10 miles walk	George Larner; Great Britain	Ernest Webb; Great Britain	Edward Spencer; Great Britain
Long jump	Frank Irons; United States	Daniel Kelly; United States	Calvin Bricker; Canada
Triple jump	Tim Ahearne; Great Britain	Garfield MacDonald; Canada	Edvard Larsen; Norway
High jump	Harry Porter; United States	Géo André; France	not awarded
High jump	Harry Porter; United States	Con Leahy; Great Britain	not awarded
High jump	Harry Porter; United States	István Somodi; Hungary	not awarded
Pole vault	Edward Cook; United States	not awarded	Edward Archibald; Canada
Pole vault	Edward Cook; United States	not awarded	Clare Jacobs; United States
Pole vault	Alfred Gilbert; United States	not awarded	Clare Jacobs; United States
Pole vault	Alfred Gilbert; United States	not awarded	Bruno Söderström; Sweden
Standing long jump	Ray Ewry; United States	Konstantinos Tsiklitiras; Greece	Martin Sheridan; United States
Standing high jump	Ray Ewry; United States	John Biller; United States	not awarded
Standing high jump	Ray Ewry; United States	Konstantinos Tsiklitiras; Greece	not awarded
Shot put	Ralph Rose; United States	Denis Horgan; Great Britain	John Garrels; United States
Discus throw	Martin Sheridan; United States	Merritt Giffin; United States	Bill Horr; United States
Hammer throw	John Flanagan; United States	Matt McGrath; United States	Con Walsh; Canada
Javelin throw	Eric Lemming; Sweden	Arne Halse; Norway	Otto Nilsson; Sweden
Greek discus	Martin Sheridan; United States	Bill Horr; United States	Verner Järvinen; Finland
Freestyle javelin	Eric Lemming; Sweden	Michalis Dorizas; Greece	Arne Halse; Norway

== Boxing ==
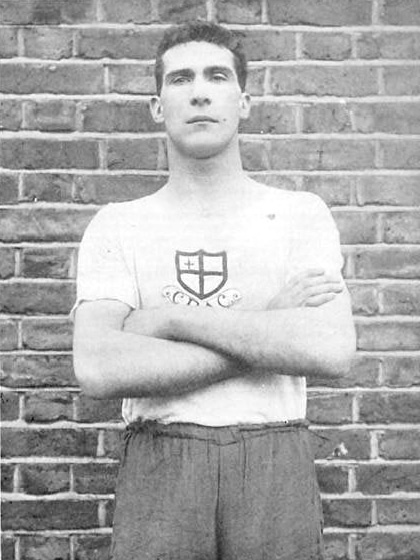
Albert Oldman, gold medallist in the Heavyweight division.

Event	Gold	Silver	Bronze
Bantamweight (-52.6 kg / 116 lb)	A. Henry Thomas; Great Britain	John Condon; Great Britain	William Webb; Great Britain
Featherweight (-57.2 kg / 126 lb)	Richard Gunn; Great Britain	Charles Morris; Great Britain	Hugh Roddin; Great Britain
Lightweight (-63.5 kg / 140 lb)	Frederick Grace; Great Britain	Frederick Spiller; Great Britain	Harry Johnson; Great Britain
Middleweight (-71.7 kg / 158 lb)	Johnny Douglas; Great Britain	Reginald Baker; Australasia	William Philo; Great Britain
Heavyweight (over 71.7 kg/158 lb)	Albert Oldman; Great Britain	Sydney Evans; Great Britain	Frederick Parks; Great Britain

== Cycling ==
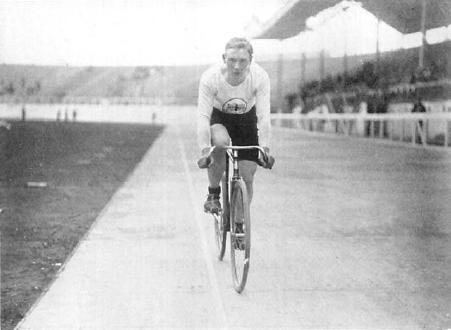
Clarence Kingsbury won the 20km cycling event at the 1908 Olympics.

Event	Gold	Silver	Bronze
660 yards	Victor Johnson; Great Britain	Émile Demangel; France	Karl Neumer; Germany
5000 metres	Benjamin Jones; Great Britain	Maurice Schilles; France	André Auffray; France
20 kilometres	Clarence Kingsbury; Great Britain	Benjamin Jones; Great Britain	Joseph Werbrouck; Belgium
100 kilometres	Charles Bartlett; Great Britain	Charles Denny; Great Britain	Octave Lapize; France
Sprint	No medalists - race declared void as time limit was exceeded in final		
Tandem	France; André Auffray; Maurice Schilles	Great Britain; Frederick Hamlin; Horace Johnson	Great Britain; Charlie Brooks; Walter Isaacs
Team pursuit	Great Britain; Benjamin Jones; Clarence Kingsbury; Leonard Meredith; Ernest Payne	Germany; Max Götze; Rudolf Katzer; Hermann Martens; Karl Neumer	Canada; William Anderson; Walter Andrews; Frederick McCarthy; William Morton

== Diving ==
Event	Gold	Silver	Bronze
3 metre springboard	Albert Zürner; Germany	Kurt Behrens; Germany	George Gaidzik; United States
3 metre springboard	Albert Zürner; Germany	Kurt Behrens; Germany	Gottlob Walz; Germany
10 metre platform	Hjalmar Johansson; Sweden	Karl Malmström; Sweden	Arvid Spångberg; Sweden

== Fencing ==
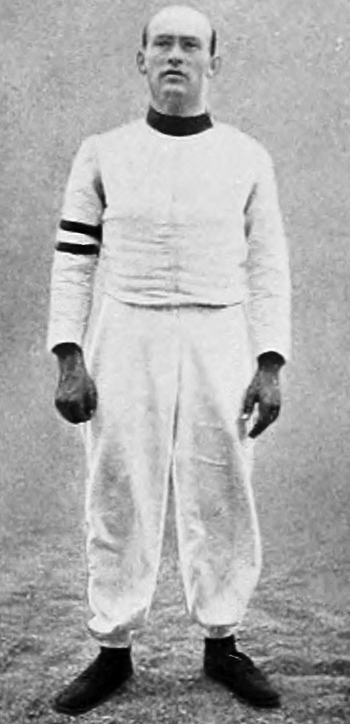
Hungarian Jenő Fuchs won a gold medal in the sabre event.

Event	Gold	Silver	Bronze
Épée	Gaston Alibert; France	Alexandre Lippmann; France	Eugène Olivier; France
Team épée	France; Gaston Alibert; Henri-Georges Berger; Charles Collignon; Eugène Olivier	Great Britain; Charles Leaf Daniell; Cecil Haig; Martin Holt; Robert Montgomerie	Belgium; Paul Anspach; Desire Beaurain; Ferdinand Feyerick; François Rom
Sabre	Jenő Fuchs; Hungary	Béla Zulawszky; Hungary	Vilém Goppold von Lobsdorf; Bohemia
Team sabre	Hungary; Jenő Fuchs; Oszkár Gerde; Péter Tóth; Lajos Werkner; Dezső Földes	Italy; Marcello Bertinetti; Riccardo Nowak; Abelardo Olivier; Alessandro Pirzio-Biroli; Sante Ceccherini	Bohemia; Vlastimil Lada-Sázavský; Vilém Goppold von Lobsdorf; Bedřich Schejbal; Jaroslav Šourek-Tuček; Otakar Lada

== Figure skating ==
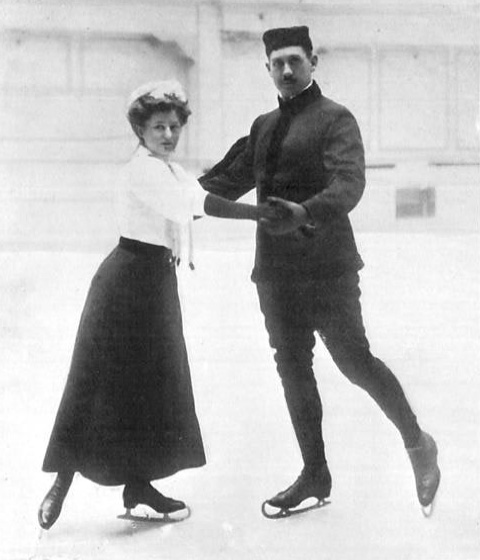
Anna Hübler and Heinrich Burger won the pairs ice skating competition.

Event	Gold	Silver	Bronze
Men's singles	Ulrich Salchow; Sweden	Richard Johansson; Sweden	Per Thorén; Sweden
Men's special figures	Nikolai Panin; Russian Empire	Arthur Cumming; Great Britain	Geoffrey Hall-Say; Great Britain
Ladies' singles	Madge Syers; Great Britain	Elsa Rendschmidt; Germany	Dorothy Greenhough-Smith; Great Britain
Pairs	Anna Hübler and Heinrich Burger; Germany	Phyllis Johnson and James H. Johnson; Great Britain	Madge Syers and Edgar Syers; Great Britain

== Football ==
Gold	Silver	Bronze
Great Britain; Horace Bailey; Arthur Berry; Frederick Chapman; Walter Corbett; Harold Hardman; Robert Hawkes; Kenneth Hunt; Herbert Smith; Harold Stapley; Clyde Purnell; Vivian Woodward George Barlow; Albert Bell; Ronald Brebner; W. Crabtree; Walter Daffern; Thomas Porter; Albert Scothern	Denmark; Peter Marius Andersen; Harald Bohr; Charles Buchwald; Ludvig Drescher; Johannes Gandil; Harald Hansen; August Lindgren; Kristian Middelboe; Nils Middelboe; Sophus Nielsen; Oskar Nørland; Bjørn Rasmussen; Vilhelm Wolfhagen Magnus Beck; Ødbert E. Bjarnholt; Knud Hansen; Einar Middelboe	Netherlands; Reinier Beeuwkes; Frans de Bruyn Kops; Karel Heijting; Jan Kok; Bok de Korver; Emil Mundt; Louis Otten; Jops Reeman; Edu Snethlage; Ed Sol; Jan Thomée; Caius Welcker Jan van den Berg; Lo la Chapelle; Vic Gonsalves; John Heijting; Tonie van Renterghem

== Gymnastics ==
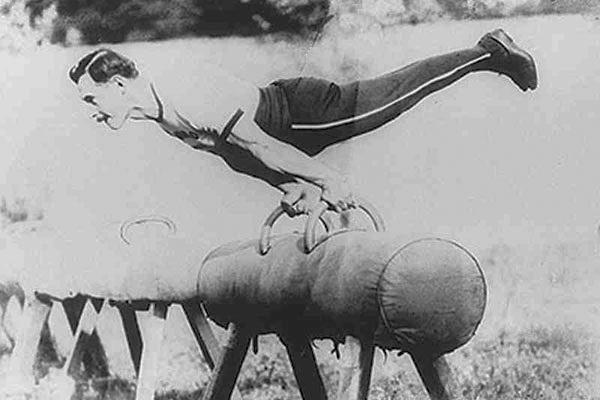
Alberto Braglia won the only individual gold medal in gymnastics at the 1908 Olympics.

Event	Gold	Silver	Bronze
Men's all-around, Individual	Alberto Braglia; Italy	Walter Tysall; Great Britain	Louis Ségura; France
Men's all-around, Team	Sweden; Gösta Åsbrink; Carl Bertilsson; Hjalmar Cedercrona; Andreas Cervin; Rudolf Degermark; Carl Folcker; Sven Forssman; Erik Granfelt; Carl Hårleman; Nils Hellsten; Gunnar Höjer; Arvid Holmberg; Carl Holmberg; Oswald Holmberg; Hugo Jahnke; John Jarlén; Gustaf Johnsson; Rolf Johnsson; Nils von Kantzow; Sven Landberg; Olle Lanner; Axel Ljung; Osvald Moberg; Carl Martin Norberg; Erik Norberg; Tor Norberg; Axel Norling; Daniel Norling; Gösta Olson; Leonard Peterson; Sven Rosén; Gustaf Rosenquist; Axel Sjöblom; Birger Sörvik; Haakon Sörvik; Karl Johan Svensson; Karl Gustaf Vinqvist; Nils Widforss	Norway; Arthur Amundsen; Carl Albert Andersen; Otto Authén; Hermann Bohne; Trygve Bøyesen; Oskar Bye; Conrad Carlsrud; Sverre Grøner; Harald Halvorsen; Harald Hansen; Petter Hol; Eugen Ingebretsen; Ole Iversen; Per Mathias Jespersen; Sigge Johannessen; Nicolai Kiær; Carl Klæth; Thor Larsen; Rolf Lefdahl; Hans Lem; Anders Moen; Frithjof Olsen; Carl Alfred Pedersen; Paul Pedersen; Sigvard Sivertsen; John Skrataas; Harald Smedvik; Andreas Strand; Olaf Syvertsen; Thomas Thorstensen	Finland; Eino Forsström; Otto Granström; Johan Kemp; Iivari Kyykoski; Heikki Lehmusto; John Lindroth; Yrjö Linko; Edvard Linna; Matti Markkanen; Kalle Mikkolainen; Veli Nieminen; Kalle Kustaa Paasia; Arvi Pohjanpää; Aarne Pohjonen; Eino Railio; Ale Riipinen; Arno Saarinen; Einar Sahlstein; Aarne Salovaara; Torsten Sandelin; Elis Sipilä; Viktor Smeds; Kaarlo Soinio; Kurt Stenberg; Väinö Tiiri; Magnus Wegelius

== Hockey ==
Gold	Silver	Bronze
Great Britain; England; Louis Baillon; Harry Freeman; Eric Green; Gerald Logan; Alan Noble; Edgar Page; Reggie Pridmore; Percy Rees; John Yate Robinson; Stanley Shoveller; Harvey Wood	Great Britain; Ireland; Edward Allman-Smith; Henry Brown; Walter Campbell; William Graham; Richard Gregg; Edward Holmes; Robert Kennedy; Henry Murphy; Jack Peterson; Walter Peterson; Charles Power; Frank Robinson	Great Britain; Scotland; Alexander Burt; John Burt; Alastair Denniston; Charles Foulkes; Hew Fraser; James Harper-Orr; Ivan Laing; Hugh Neilson; Gordon Orchardson; Norman Stevenson; Hugh Walker
Great Britain; England; Louis Baillon; Harry Freeman; Eric Green; Gerald Logan; Alan Noble; Edgar Page; Reggie Pridmore; Percy Rees; John Yate Robinson; Stanley Shoveller; Harvey Wood	Great Britain; Ireland; Edward Allman-Smith; Henry Brown; Walter Campbell; William Graham; Richard Gregg; Edward Holmes; Robert Kennedy; Henry Murphy; Jack Peterson; Walter Peterson; Charles Power; Frank Robinson	Great Britain; Wales; Frank Connah; Llewellyn Evans; Arthur Law; Richard Lyne; Wilfred Pallott; Frederick Phillips; Edward Richards; Charles Shephard; Bertrand Turnbull; Philip Turnbull; James Williams

== Jeu de paume ==
Event	Gold	Silver	Bronze
Men's tournament	Jay Gould II; United States	Eustace Miles; Great Britain	Neville Bulwer-Lytton; Great Britain

== Lacrosse ==
Gold	Silver	Bronze
Canada; Frank Dixon; George Campbell; Gus Dillon; Richard Louis Duckett; George Rennie; Clarence McKerrow; Alexander Turnbull; Henry Hoobin; Ernest Hamilton; John Broderick; Tommy Gorman; Patrick Brennan (Capt.); D. McLeod; A. Mara; J. Fyon	Great Britain; Gustav Alexander; George Buckland; Eric Dutton; S. N. Hayes; Wilfrid Johnson; Edward Jones; Reginald Martin; Gerald Mason; Johnson Parker-Smith; Hubert Ramsey (Capt.); Charles Scott; Norman Whitley; C. J. Mason; F. S. Johnson; V. G. Gilbey; H. Shorrocks; J. Alexander; L. Blockey	not awarded

== Polo ==
Gold	Silver	Bronze
Great Britain; Charles Darley Miller; George Arthur Miller; Patteson Womersley Nickalls; Herbert Haydon Wilson	Great Britain; Walter Buckmaster; Frederick Freake; Walter Jones; John Wodehouse; Great Britain; Ireland; John Hardress Lloyd; John Paul McCann; Percy O'Reilly; Auston Rotherham	not awarded

== Rackets ==
Event	Gold	Silver	Bronze
Men's singles	Evan Noel (GBR)	Henry Leaf (GBR)	John Jacob Astor (GBR)
Men's singles	Evan Noel (GBR)	Henry Leaf (GBR)	Henry Brougham (GBR)
Men's doubles	Vane Pennell and John Jacob Astor (GBR)	Edmund Bury and Cecil Browning (GBR)	Evan Noel and Henry Leaf (GBR)

== Rowing ==
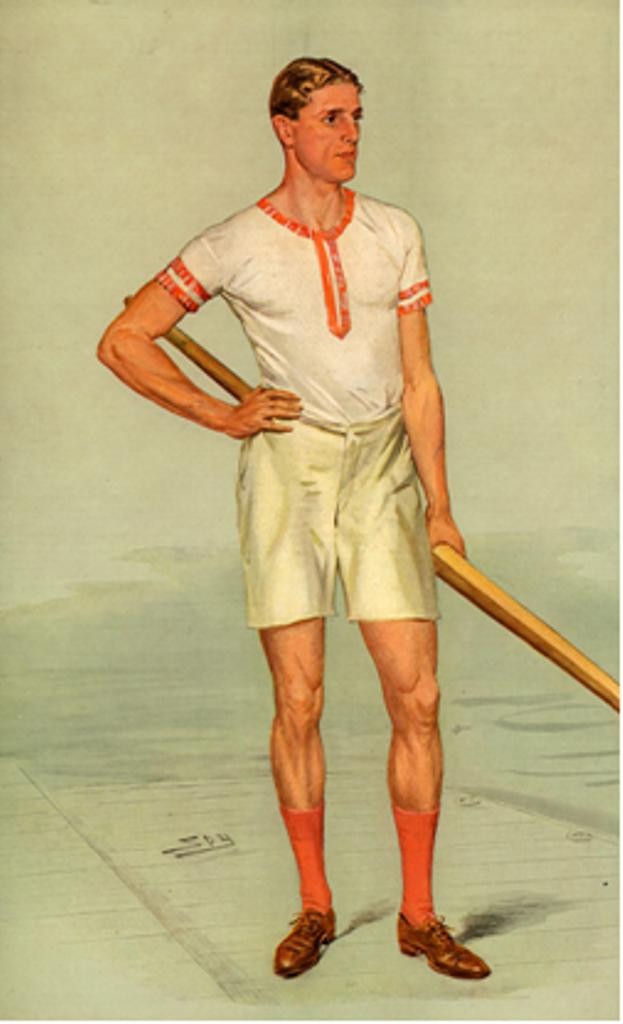
Raymond Etherington-Smith, one of the British team who won a rowing gold medal in the eights event.

Event	Gold	Silver	Bronze	Bronze
Single sculls	Great Britain; Harry Blackstaffe	Great Britain; Alexander McCulloch	Germany; Bernhard von Gaza	Hungary; Károly Levitzky
Coxless pair	Great Britain; Leander John Fenning; Gordon Thomson	Great Britain; Leander George Fairbairn; Philip Verdon	Canada; Argonaut Frederick Toms; Norway Jackes	Germany; Berlin Martin Stahnke; Willy Düskow
Coxless four	Great Britain; Magdalen Collier Cudmore; James Angus Gillan; Duncan Mackinnon; John Somers-Smith	Great Britain; Leander Philip Filleul; Harold Barker; John Fenning; Gordon Thomson	Canada; Argonaut Gordon Balfour; Becher Gale; Charles Riddy; Geoffrey Taylor	Netherlands; Amstel Hermannus Höfte; Albertus Wielsma; Johan Burk; Bernardus Croon
Eights	Great Britain; Leander Albert Gladstone; Frederick Kelly; Banner Johnstone; Guy Nickalls; Charles Burnell; Ronald Sanderson; Raymond Etherington-Smith; Henry Bucknall; Gilchrist Maclagan	Belgium; Royal Club Nautique de Gand Oscar Taelman; Marcel Morimont; Rémy Orban; Georges Mys; François Vergucht; Polydore Veirman; Oscar de Somville; Rodolphe Poma; Alfred Van Landeghem	Canada; Argonaut Irvine Robertson; Joseph Wright; Julius Thomson; Walter Lewis; Gordon Balfour; Becher Gale; Charles Riddy; Geoffrey Taylor; Douglas Kertland	Great Britain; Cambridge Frank Jerwood; Eric Powell; Oswald Carver; Edward Williams; Henry Goldsmith; Harold Kitching; John Burn; Douglas Stuart; Richard Boyle

== Rugby ==
Gold	Silver	Bronze
Australasia; Phil Carmichael; Charles Russell; Daniel Carroll; Jack Hickey; Frank Smith; Chris McKivat; Arthur McCabe; Thomas Griffen; John Barnett; Patrick McCue; Sydney Middleton; Tom Richards; Malcolm McArthur; Charles McMurtrie; Robert Craig	Great Britain; John Jackett; Barney Solomon; Bert Solomon; Frederick Dean; J. T. Jose; Thomas Wedge; James Davey; Richard Jackett; E. J. Jones; Arthur Wilson; Nicholas Tregurtha; A. Lawrey; C. R. Marshall; A. Wilcocks; John Trevaskis	not awarded

== Sailing ==
Event	Gold	Silver	Bronze
6 Metre:	Great Britain	Belgium	France
7 Metre:	Great Britain	not awarded	
8 Metre:	Great Britain	Sweden	Great Britain
12 Metre:	Great Britain	Great Britain	not awarded
15 Metre:	no entries		

== Shooting ==
Event	Gold	Silver	Bronze
1000 yd free rifle	Joshua Millner; Great Britain	Kellogg Casey; United States	Maurice Blood; Great Britain
300 m free rifle	Albert Helgerud; Norway	Harry Simon; United States	Ole Sæther; Norway
300 m free rifle, team	Norway; Julius Braathe; Albert Helgerud; Einar Liberg; Olaf Sæther; Ole Sæther; Gudbrand Skatteboe	Sweden; Per-Olof Arvidsson; Janne Gustafsson; Axel Jansson; Gustaf Adolf Jonsson; Claës Rundberg; Gustav-Adolf Sjöberg	France; Eugène Balme; Raoul de Boigne; Albert Courquin; Léon Johnson; Maurice Lecoq; André Parmentier
Team military rifle	United States; Charles Benedict; Kellogg Casey; Ivan Eastman; William Leuschner; William Martin; Charles Winder	Great Britain; Arthur Fulton; John Martin; Harcourt Ommundsen; William Padgett; Philip Richardson; Fleetwood Varley	Canada; Charles Crowe; William Eastcott; S. Harry Kerr; Dugald McInnis; William Smith; Bertram Williams
Stationary target small-bore	Arthur Carnell; Great Britain	Harold Humby; Great Britain	George Barnes; Great Britain
Moving target small-bore	John Fleming; Great Britain	Maurice Matthews; Great Britain	William Marsden; Great Britain
Disappearing target small-bore	William Styles; Great Britain	Harold Hawkins; Great Britain	Edward Amoore; Great Britain
Team small-bore	Great Britain; Edward Amoore; Harold Humby; Maurice Matthews; William Pimm	Sweden; Eric Carlberg; Vilhelm Carlberg; Johan Hübner von Holst; Franz-Albert Schartau	France; Henri Bonnefoy; Paul Colas; Léon Lécuyer; André Regaud
Single-shot running deer	Oscar Swahn; Sweden	Ted Ranken; Great Britain	Alexander Rogers; Great Britain
Double-shot running deer	Walter Winans; United States	Ted Ranken; Great Britain	Oscar Swahn; Sweden
Team single-shot running deer	Sweden; Arvid Knöppel; Ernst Rosell; Alfred Swahn; Oscar Swahn	Great Britain; William Ellicott; William Russell Lane-Joynt; Charles Nix; Ted Ranken	not awarded
Individual pistol	Paul Van Asbroeck; Belgium	Réginald Storms; Belgium	James Gorman; United States
Team pistol	United States; Charles Axtell; Irving Calkins; John Dietz; James Gorman	Belgium; René Englebert; Charles Paumier du Verger; Réginald Storms; Paul Van Asbroeck	Great Britain; Geoffrey Coles; William Ellicott; Henry Lynch-Staunton; Jesse Wallingford
Individual trap shooting	Walter Ewing; Canada	George Beattie; Canada	Alexander Maunder; Great Britain; Anastasios Metaxas; Greece (Note: Metaxas is generally credited with a bronze medal; no tie-breaker was held. The 1908 official report at p. 280 lists Metaxas as having tied with Maunder and assigns bronze medals to each. However, Metaxas does not appear in the IOC medal database, which lists only Maunder as sole bronze medalist. Some sources follow this database.)
Team trap shooting	Great Britain; Percy Easte; Alexander Maunder; Frederic Moore; Charles Palmer; John Pike; John Postans	Canada; George Beattie; Walter Ewing; Mylie Fletcher; Donald McMackon; George Vivian; Arthur Westover	Great Britain; John Butt; Henry Creasey; Bob Hutton; William Morris; George Herbert Skinner; George Whitaker

== Swimming ==
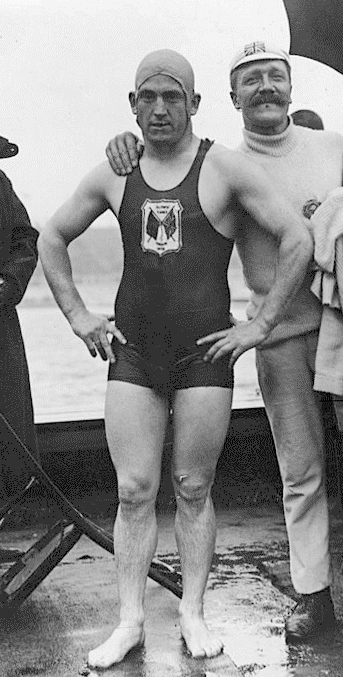
Henry Taylor won two swimming gold medals at the 1908 Olympics.

Event	Gold	Silver	Bronze
100 m freestyle	Charles Daniels; United States	Zoltán Halmay; Hungary	Harald Julin; Sweden
400 m freestyle	Henry Taylor; Great Britain	Frank Beaurepaire; Australasia	Otto Scheff; Austria
1500 m freestyle	Henry Taylor; Great Britain	Thomas Battersby; Great Britain	Frank Beaurepaire; Australasia
100 m backstroke	Arno Bieberstein; Germany	Ludvig Dam; Denmark	Herbert Haresnape; Great Britain
200 m breaststroke	Frederick Holman; Great Britain	William Robinson; Great Britain	Pontus Hanson; Sweden
4 × 200 m freestyle relay	Great Britain; John Derbyshire; Paul Radmilovic; William Foster; Henry Taylor	Hungary; József Munk; Imre Zachár; Béla Las-Torres; Zoltán Halmay	United States; Harry Hebner; Leo Goodwin; Charles Daniels; Leslie Rich

== Tennis ==
Event	Gold	Silver	Bronze
Men's Singles	Josiah Ritchie; Great Britain	Otto Froitzheim; Germany	Wilberforce Eaves; Great Britain
Men's Doubles	George Hillyard and Reginald Doherty (GBR)	Josiah Ritchie and James Parke (GBR)	Clement Cazalet and Charles Dixon (GBR)
Men's Indoor Singles	Arthur Gore; Great Britain	George Caridia; Great Britain	Josiah Ritchie; Great Britain
Men's Indoor Doubles	Herbert Barrett and Arthur Gore (GBR)	George Caridia and George Simond (GBR)	Wollmar Boström and Gunnar Setterwall (SWE)
Women's Singles	Dorothea Chambers; Great Britain	Penelope Boothby; Great Britain	Ruth Winch; Great Britain
Women's Indoor Singles	Gwendoline Eastlake-Smith; Great Britain	Alice Greene; Great Britain	Märtha Adlerstråhle; Sweden

== Tug of war ==
Gold	Silver	Bronze
Great Britain; William Hirons; Frederick Goodfellow; Edward Barrett; John James Shepherd; Frederick Humphreys; Edwin Mills; Albert Ireton; Frederick Merriman	Great Britain; Patrick Philbin; James Clarke; Thomas Butler; Alexander Kidd; George Smith; Thomas Swindlehurst; Daniel Lowey; William Greggan	Great Britain; Walter Tammas; William Slade; Alexander Munro; Ernest Ebbage; Thomas Homewood; Walter Chaffe; James Woodget; Joseph Dowler

== Water motorsports ==
Games	Gold	Silver	Bronze
Class A — Open	France; Camille	not awarded	not awarded
Class B — Under 60 feet	Great Britain; Gyrinus	not awarded	not awarded
Class C — 6.5–8 metres	Great Britain; Gyrinus	not awarded	not awarded

== Water polo ==
Gold	Silver	Bronze
Great Britain; George Cornet; Charles Forsyth; George Nevinson; Paul Radmilovic; Charles Smith; Thomas Thould; George Wilkinson	Belgium; Victor Boin; Herman Donners; Fernand Feyaerts; Oscar Grégoire; Herman Meyboom; Albert Michant; Joseph Pletinckx	Sweden; Robert Andersson; Erik Bergvall; Pontus Hanson; Harald Julin; Torsten Kumfeldt; Axel Runström; Gunnar Wennerström

== Wrestling ==
=== Freestyle ===
Event	Gold	Silver	Bronze
Bantamweight	George Mehnert; United States	William J. Press; Great Britain	Aubert Côté; Canada
Featherweight	George Dole; United States	James Slim; Great Britain	William McKie; Great Britain
Lightweight	George de Relwyskow; Great Britain	William Wood; Great Britain	Albert Gingell; Great Britain
Middleweight	Stanley Bacon; Great Britain	George de Relwyskow; Great Britain	Frederick Beck; Great Britain
Heavyweight	Con O'Kelly; Great Britain	Jacob Gundersen; Norway	Edward Barrett; Great Britain

=== Greco-Roman ===
Event	Gold	Silver	Bronze
Lightweight	Enrico Porro; Italy	Nikolay Orlov; Russian Empire	Arvo Lindén; Finland
Middleweight	Frithiof Mårtensson; Sweden	Mauritz Andersson; Sweden	Anders Andersen; Denmark
Light heavyweight	Verner Weckman; Finland	Yrjö Saarela; Finland	Carl Jensen; Denmark
Super heavyweight	Richárd Weisz; Hungary	Aleksandr Petrov; Russian Empire	Søren Marinus Jensen; Denmark

== Statistics ==
=== Medal leaders ===
Athletes who won more than two medals are listed below.

Athlete	Nation	Sport	Gold	Silver	Bronze	Total
Mel Sheppard	United States	Athletics	3	0	0	3
Henry Taylor	Great Britain	Swimming	3	0	0	3
Benjamin Jones	Great Britain	Cycling	2	1	0	3
Martin Sheridan	United States	Athletics	2	0	1	3
Oscar Swahn	Sweden	Shooting	2	0	1	3
Josiah Ritchie	Great Britain	Tennis	1	1	1	3
Ted Ranken	Great Britain	Shooting	0	3	0	3

== See also ==
- 1908 Summer Olympics medal table
