= Gymnastics at the 1908 Summer Olympics =

Coordinates: 51.5136°N 0.2274°E

Gymnastics at the Games of the IV Olympiad
- Venue: White City Stadium
- Dates: July 14–16, 1908
- Competitors: 327 from 14 nations

At the 1908 Summer Olympics, two gymnastics events for men were contested. No nation was successful in winning more than one medal. No women's competitions were held, though women did participate in non-competitive gymnastic displays.

== Medal summary ==
Games	Gold	Silver	Bronze
Men's all-around, Individual	Alberto Braglia; Italy	Walter Tysall; Great Britain	Louis Ségura; France
Men's all-around, Team	Sweden; Gösta Åsbrink; Carl Bertilsson; Hjalmar Cedercrona; Andreas Cervin; Rudolf Degermark; Carl Folcker; Sven Forssman; Erik Granfelt; Carl Hårleman; Nils Hellsten; Gunnar Höjer; Arvid Holmberg; Carl Holmberg; Oswald Holmberg; Hugo Jahnke; John Jarlén; Gustaf Johnsson; Rolf Johnsson; Nils von Kantzow; Sven Landberg; Olle Lanner; Axel Ljung; Osvald Moberg; Carl Martin Norberg; Erik Norberg; Tor Norberg; Axel Norling; Daniel Norling; Gösta Olson; Leonard Peterson; Sven Rosén; Gustaf Rosenquist; Axel Sjöblom; Birger Sörvik; Haakon Sörvik; Karl Johan Svensson; Karl Gustaf Vinqvist; Nils Widforss	Norway; Arthur Amundsen; Carl Albert Andersen; Otto Authén; Hermann Bohne; Trygve Bøyesen; Oskar Bye; Conrad Carlsrud; Sverre Grøner; Harald Halvorsen; Harald Hansen; Petter Hol; Eugen Ingebretsen; Ole Iversen; Per Mathias Jespersen; Sigge Johannessen; Nicolai Kiær; Carl Klæth; Thor Larsen; Rolf Lefdahl; Hans Lem; Anders Moen; Frithjof Olsen; Carl Alfred Pedersen; Paul Pedersen; Sigvard Sivertsen; John Skrataas; Harald Smedvik; Andreas Strand; Olaf Syvertsen; Thomas Thorstensen	Finland; Eino Forsström; Otto Granström; Johan Kemp; Iivari Kyykoski; Heikki Lehmusto; John Lindroth; Yrjö Linko; Edvard Linna; Matti Markkanen; Kalle Mikkolainen; Veli Nieminen; Kalle Kustaa Paasia; Arvi Pohjanpää; Aarne Pohjonen; Eino Railio; Ale Riipinen; Arno Saarinen; Einar Sahlstein; Aarne Salovaara; Torsten Sandelin; Elis Sipilä; Viktor Smeds; Kaarlo Soinio; Kurt Stenberg; Väinö Tiiri; Magnus Wegelius

== Participating nations ==
A total of 327 gymnasts from 14 nations competed at the London Games:

- Belgium (2)
- Bohemia (2)
- Canada (2)
- Denmark (24)
- Finland (31)
- France (60)
- Germany (11)
- Great Britain (65)
- Hungary (6)
- Italy (32)
- Netherlands (23)
- Norway (30)
- Sweden (38)
- Turkey (1)

== Medal table ==
Rank	Nation	Gold	Silver	Bronze	Total
1	Italy	1	0	0	1
1	Sweden	1	0	0	1
3	Great Britain	0	1	0	1
3	Norway	0	1	0	1
5	Finland	0	0	1	1
5	France	0	0	1	1
Totals (6 entries)		2	2	2	6

== Sources ==
- Cook, Theodore Andrea (1908). The Fourth Olympiad, Being the Official Report. London: British Olympic Association.
- De Wael, Herman (2001). "Gymnastics 1908". Herman's Full Olympians. Archived from the original on 23 February 2005.
