= Sweden at the 1908 Summer Olympics =

- IOC code: SWE

in London
- Competitors: 168 in 14 sports
- Flag bearer: Erik Granfelt
- Medals Ranked 3rd: Gold 8 Silver 6 Bronze 11 Total 25

Summer Olympics appearances (overview)
- 1896; 1900; 1904; 1908; 1912; 1920; 1924; 1928; 1932; 1936; 1948; 1952; 1956; 1960; 1964; 1968; 1972; 1976; 1980; 1984; 1988; 1992; 1996; 2000; 2004; 2008; 2012; 2016; 2020; 2024

Other related appearances
- 1906 Intercalated Games

Sweden competed at the 1908 Summer Olympics in London, United Kingdom. It was the third appearance of the European nation, which had missed only the 1904 Summer Olympics.

== Medalists ==
Medal	Name	Sport	Event
Gold	Frithiof Mårtensson	Wrestling (Greco-Roman)	Men's middleweight
Gold	Swedish men's team	Gymnastics	Men's team
Gold	Hjalmar Johansson	Diving	Men's 10 m platform
Gold	Ulrich Salchow	Figure skating	Men's singles
Gold	Oscar Swahn	Shooting	Men's single-shot running deer
Gold	Arvid Knöppel; Ernst Rosell; Alfred Swahn; Oscar Swahn	Shooting	Men's team single-shot running deer
Gold	Eric Lemming	Athletics	Men's javelin throw
Gold	Eric Lemming	Athletics	Men's freestyle javelin
Silver	Mauritz Andersson	Wrestling (Greco-Roman)	Men's middleweight
Silver	Karl Malmström	Diving	Men's 10 m platform
Silver	Richard Johansson	Figure skating	Men's singles
Silver	Carl Hellström; Edmund Thormählen; Erik Wallerius; Eric Sandberg; Harald Wallin	Sailing	Men's 8 metre class
Silver	Per-Olof Arvidsson; Janne Gustafsson; Axel Jansson; Gustaf Adolf Jonsson; Claës Rundberg; Gustav-Adolf Sjöberg	Shooting	Men's team free rifle
Silver	Eric Carlberg; Vilhelm Carlberg; Johan Hübner von Holst; Franz-Albert Schartau	Shooting	Men's team small-bore rifle
Bronze	Robert Andersson; Erik Bergvall; Pontus Hanson; Harald Julin; Torsten Kumfeldt; Axel Runström; Gunnar Wennerström	Water polo	Men's competitionGD
Bronze	Märtha Adlerstråhle	Tennis	Women's indoor singles
Bronze	Wollmar Boström; Gunnar Setterwall	Tennis	Men's indoor doubles
Bronze	Harald Julin	Swimming	Men's 100 m freestyle
Bronze	Pontus Hanson	Swimming	Men's 200 m breaststroke
Bronze	Arvid Spångberg	Diving	Men's 10 m platform
Bronze	Per Thorén	Figure skating	Men's singles
Bronze	Oscar Swahn	Shooting	Men's double-shot running deer
Bronze	Otto Nilsson	Athletics	Men's freestyle javelin
Bronze	Bruno Söderström	Athletics	Men's pole vault
Bronze	John Svanberg	Athletics	Men's 5 miles

== Athletics ==
Sweden was one of 5 nations to win at least one gold medal in athletics, and one of only three to earn more than one. Sweden's two gold medals placed the nation third in the standings behind the United States and Great Britain.

Running

Event	Place	Athlete	Heats	Semifinals	Final
Men's 100 metres	Heats	Knut Lindberg	11.2 seconds 2nd, heat 8	Did not advance	
Men's 100 metres	Heats	Knut Stenborg	11.5 seconds 2nd, heat 7	Did not advance	
Men's 100 metres	Heats	Karl Fryksdal	Unknown; 3rd, heat 12	Did not advance	
Men's 200 metres	Semi- finalist	Sven Låftman	23.8 seconds 1st, heat 6	Did not start —, semifinal 2	Did not advance
Men's 200 metres	Heats	Knut Stenborg	Unknown; 4th, heat 2	Did not advance	
Men's 200 metres	Heats	Knut Lindberg	Unknown; 4th, heat 11	Did not advance	
Men's 400 metres	Heats	Sven Låftman	Unknown; 3rd, heat 4	Did not advance	
Men's 400 metres	Heats	Arvid Ringstrand	Unknown; 3rd, heat 14	Did not advance	
Men's 800 metres	Semi- finalist	Kristian Hellström	None held	Unknown; 2nd, semifinal 8	Did not advance
Men's 800 metres	Semi- finalist	Evert Björn	None held	Unknown; 3rd, semifinal 1	Did not advance
Men's 800 metres	—	Edward Dahl	None held	Did not finish —, semifinal 5	Did not advance
Men's 800 metres	—	Frank Danielson	None held	Did not finish —, semifinal 6	Did not advance
Men's 1500 metres	Semi- finalist	Edward Dahl	None held	Unknown; 2nd, semifinal 8	Did not advance
Men's 1500 metres	Semi- finalist	Axel Andersson	None held	Unknown; 6th, semifinal 8	Did not advance
Men's 1500 metres	Semi- finalist	Evert Björn	None held	Did not finish —, semifinal 3	Did not advance
Men's 110 metre hurdles	—	Oscar Lemming	Did not finish —, heat 6	Did not advance	
Men's medley relay	Semi- finalist	Sven Laftman; Knut Lindberg; Knut Stenborg; Evert Björn	None held	Unknown; 2nd, semifinal 1	Did not advance
Men's 3 mile team race	Semi- finalist	John Svanberg	None held	14:57.0; 6 points, team=21	Did not advance
Men's 3 mile team race	Semi- finalist	Georg Peterson	None held	15:14.4; 7 points, team=21	Did not advance
Men's 3 mile team race	Semi- finalist	Edward Dahl	None held	15:21.0; 8 points, team=21	Did not advance
Men's 3 mile team race	No place	Axel Wiegandt	None held	15:33.0; No score, team=21	Did not advance
Men's 3 mile team race	No place	Seth Landqvist	None held	15:46.4; No score, team=21	Did not advance
Men's 5 miles	3rd	John Svanberg	None held	25:46.2; 1st, semifinal 1	25:37.2
Men's 5 miles	9th	Seth Landqvist	None held	27:00.2; 1st, semifinal 3	Unknown
Men's 5 miles	Heats	Georg Peterson	None held	Unknown; 3rd, semifinal 4	Did not advance
Men's 5 miles	—	Edward Dahl	None held	Did not finish —, semifinal 2	Did not advance
Men's marathon	8th	John Svanberg	None held		3:07:50.8
Men's marathon	21st	Gustaf Törnros	None held		3:30:20.8
Men's marathon	—	Seth Landqvist	None held		Did not finish
Men's marathon	—	Johan Lindqvist	None held		Did not finish
Men's marathon	—	J. T. Bergvall	None held		Did not start
Men's marathon	—	J. G. A. Lundberg	None held		Did not start
Men's marathon	—	Georg Peterson	None held		Did not start
Men's 3500 metre walk	7th	Einar Rothman	None held	17:40.2; 3rd, semifinal 2	17:50.0
Men's 10 mile walk	—	Einar Rothman	None held	Did not finish —, semifinal 2	Did not advance

Jumping

Event	Place	Athlete	Height/ Distance
Men's high jump	8th	Axel Hedenlund	1.80 metres
Men's high jump	16th	Folke Hellstedt	1.67 metres
Men's long jump	10th	Gunnar Rönström	6.66 metres
Men's long jump	20th	Carl Silfverstrand	6.34 metres
Men's long jump	21-32	Arvid Ringstrand	Unknown
Men's long jump	21-32	Hugo Wieslander	Unknown
Men's triple jump	7th	Karl Fryksdal	13.65 metres
Men's pole vault	3rd	Bruno Söderström	3.58 metres
Men's pole vault	10th	Carl Silfverstrand	3.20 metres
Men's standing high jump	14th	Allan Bengtsson	1.40 metres
Men's standing high jump	14th	Karl Fryksdahl	1.40 metres
Men's standing long jump	5th	Ragnar Ekberg	3.19 metres

Throwing

Event	Place	Athlete	Distance
Men's shot put	9-25	Hugo Wieslander	Unknown
Men's discus throw	12-42	Folke Fleetwood	Unknown
Men's discus throw	12-42	Eric Lemming	Unknown
Men's discus throw	12-42	Theodor Neijström	Unknown
Men's discus throw	12-42	Otto Nilsson	Unknown
Men's discus throw	12-42	Hugo Wieslander	Unknown
Men's hammer throw	8th	Eric Lemming	43.06 metres
Men's hammer throw	10-19	Robert Olsson	Unknown
Men's javelin throw	1st	Eric Lemming	51.92 metres
Men's javelin throw	3rd	Otto Nilsson	47.11 metres
Men's javelin throw	8-16	Hugo Wieslander	Unknown
Men's Greek discus	11-23	Folke Fleetwood	Unknown
Men's Greek discus	11-23	Eric Lemming	Unknown
Men's freestyle javelin	1st	Eric Lemming	54.44 metres
Men's freestyle javelin	5th	Hugo Wieslander	47.56 metres
Men's freestyle javelin	10-33	Knut Lindberg	Unknown
Men's freestyle javelin	10-33	Otto Nilsson	Unknown

== Cycling ==
Event	Place	Cyclist	Heats	Semifinals	Final
Men's 660 yards	Heats	Andrew Hansen	Unknown; 3rd, heat 6	Did not advance	
Men's 20 kilometres	5-9	Andrew Hansen	None held	34:53.6; 1st, semifinal 5	Unknown
Men's 20 kilometres	Semi- finalist	Gustaf Westerberg	None held	33:41.4; 3rd, semifinal 6	Did not advance
Men's 100 kilometres	9-17	Andrew Hansen	None held	2:50:21.4; 1st, semifinal 1	Did not finish
Men's 100 kilometres	9-17	Gustaf Westerberg	None held	Unknown; 3rd, semifinal 2	Did not finish
Men's sprint	Heats	Andrew Hansen	Unknown; 2nd, heat 3	Did not advance	

== Diving ==
Sweden dominated the platform diving in 1908, taking the top four spots in the event. In addition to the men's competitions, Ebba Gisico participated in a women's diving exhibition along with Valborg Florström of Finland.

Event	Place	Diver	Preliminary groups	Semi- finals	Final
Men's 10 metre platform	1st	Hjalmar Johansson	78.40 points 1st, group 2	80.75 points 1st, semifinal 2	83.75 points
Men's 10 metre platform	2nd	Karl Malmström	73.95 points 2nd, group 2	67.00 points 2nd, semifinal 1	78.73 points
Men's 10 metre platform	3rd	Arvid Spangberg	79.20 points 1st, group 4	72.30 points 1st, semifinal 1	74.00 points
Men's 10 metre platform	4th	Robert Andersson	73.55 points 1st, group 5	66.75 points 2nd, semifinal 2	68.30 points
Men's 10 metre platform	8th	Hilmer Löfberg	68.90 points 1st, group 3	59.18 points 4th, semifinal 1	Did not advance
Men's 10 metre platform	9th	Harald Arbin	76.80 points 2nd, group 4	52.81 points 5th, semifinal 1	Did not advance
Men's 10 metre platform	11th	Erik Adlerz	74.10 points 3rd, group 1	Did not advance	
Men's 10 metre platform	15th	Gunnar Vingqvist	65.70 points 4th, group 4	Did not advance	
Men's 10 metre platform	17th	Sigfrid Larsson	64.80 points 3rd, group 3	Did not advance	
Men's 10 metre platform	20th	Axel Runström	57.60 points 4th, group 5	Did not advance	
Men's 3 metre springboard	14th	Karl Malmström	70.30 points 4th, group 3	Did not advance	
Men's 3 metre springboard	20th	Sigfrid Larsson	64.50 points 5th, group 4	Did not advance	

== Fencing ==
Event	Place	Fencer	First round	Second round	Semi- final	Final
Men's épée	Semi- finalist	Gustaf Lindblom	5-3 (2nd in I)	3-1 (1st in 5)	4-5 (6th in 2)	Did not advance
Men's épée	First round	Eric Carlberg	3-3 (4th in A)	Did not advance		
Men's épée	First round	Henry Peyron	3-3 (4th in F)	Did not advance		
Men's épée	First round	Birger Cnattingius	1-4 (4th in L)	Did not advance		
Men's épée	First round	Pontus von Rosen	3-4 (5th in A)	Did not advance		
Men's épée	First round	Georg Branting	0-4 (5th in K)	Did not advance		
Men's épée	First round	Gösta Olson	1-5 (6th in L)			

Event	Place	Fencers	Play-in match	First round	Semi- finals	Final	Repechage	Silver medal match
Men's team épée	6th	Eric Carlberg; Gustaf Lindblom; Henry Peyron; Pontus von Rosen	Bye	Lost to Belgium; 11-6 Out; 6th place	Did not advance		Not relegated	

== Figure skating ==
The Swedish men swept the medals, while the only female Swedish skater took 4th.

Event	Place	Skater	Score
Men's individual	1st	Ulrich Salchow	377.3
Men's individual	2nd	Richard Johansson	365.2
Men's individual	3rd	Per Thorén	357.4
Women's individual	4th	Elna Montgomery	170.3

== Football ==
Summary

Key:

- W – Win D – Draw L – Loss
- A.E.T – After extra time.
- RP – Game replayed

Team	Event	First round	Semifinal	Final / BM	
Team	Event	Opposition Score	Opposition Score	Opposition Score	Rank
Sweden men's	Men's tournament	Great Britain; L 1–12	Did not advance	Netherlands; L 0–2	4

Players

Sune Almkvist, Nils Andersson, Karl Ansén, Oskar Bengtsson, Gustaf Bergström,
Arvid Fagrell, Åke Fjästad, Karl Gustafsson, Valter Lidén, Hans Lindman (captain),
Teodor Malm, Sven Ohlsson, Olle Olsson, Sven Olsson

== Gymnastics ==
Event	Place	Gymnast	Score
Men's team	1st	Gösta Åsbrink, Carl Bertilsson, Andreas Cervin, Hjalmar Cederkrona, Rudolf Degermark, Carl Folcker, Sven Forssman, Erik Granfelt, Carl Hårleman, Nils Hellsten, Gunnar Höjer, Arvid Holmberg, Carl Holmberg, Osvald Holmberg, Hugo Jahnke, John Jarlén, Gustaf Johnsson, Rolf Johnsson, Nils Kantzow, Sven Landberg, Olle Lanner, Axel Jung, Osvald Moberg, Carl Martin Norberg, Erik Norberg, Thor Norberg, Axel Norling, Daniel Norling, Gösta Olsson, Leonard Peterson, Sven Rosén, Gustav Rosenqvist, Axel Sjöblom, Birger Sörvik, Haakon Sörvik, Karl Johan Svensson, Gustav Vinqvist, Nils Widforss	438

== Sailing ==
Class	Place	Boat	Sailors
6 metre	5th	Freja	Karl-Einar Sjögren, Birger Gustafsson, Jonas Jonsson
8 metre	2nd	Vinga	Carl Hellström, Edmund Thormählen, Erik Wallerius, Eric Sandberg, Harald Wallin
8 metre	5th	Saga	John Carlsson, Edvin Hagberg, Hjalmar Lönnroth, Karl Ljungberg, August Olsson

== Shooting ==
Event	Place	Shooter	Score
Men's 1000 yard free rifle	34th	Ossian Jörgensen	77
Men's 1000 yard free rifle	43rd	Erik Ohlsson	54
Men's 1000 yard free rifle	44th	Fredrik Mossberg	48
Men's 1000 yard free rifle	46th	Ernst Rosell	27
Men's 300 metre free rifle	4th	Gustav-Adolf Sjöberg	874
Men's 300 metre free rifle	5th	Janne Gustafsson	872
Men's 300 metre free rifle	7th	Axel Jansson	843
Men's 300 metre free rifle	12th	Per-Olof Arvidsson	823
Men's 300 metre free rifle	15th	Gustaf Adolf Jonsson	812
Men's 300 metre free rifle	23rd	Fredrik Mossberg	761
Men's 300 metre free rifle	28th	Erik Ohlsson	751
Men's 300 metre free rifle	50th	Ossian Jörgensen	420
Men's team free rifle	2nd	Gustaf Adolf Jonsson; Per-Olof Arvidsson; Axel Jansson; Gustav-Adolf Sjöberg; Claës Rundberg; Janne Gustafsson	4711
Men's team military rifle	5th	Claës Rundberg; Ossian Jörgensen; Janne Gustafsson; Per-Olof Arvidsson; Axel Jansson; Gustaf Adolf Jonsson	2213
Men's stationary target small-bore rifle	10th	Vilhelm Carlberg	370
Men's stationary target small-bore rifle	18th	Johan Hübner von Holst	349
Men's moving target small-bore rifle	8th	Otto von Rosen	18
Men's moving target small-bore rifle	15th	Eric Carlberg	9
Men's moving target small-bore rifle	15th	Vilhelm Carlberg	9
Men's moving target small-bore rifle	15th	Johan Hübner von Holst	9
Men's moving target small-bore rifle	—	Frans-Albert Schartau	Did not finish
Men's disappearing target small-bore rifle	7th	Vilhelm Carlberg	45
Men's disappearing target small-bore rifle	9th	Eric Carlberg	42
Men's disappearing target small-bore rifle	9th	Otto von Rosen	42
Men's disappearing target small-bore rifle	9th	Frans-Albert Schartau	42
Men's disappearing target small-bore rifle	15th	Johan Hübner von Holst	39
Men's team small-bore rifle	2nd	Vilhelm Carlberg; Frans-Albert Schartau; Johan Hübner von Holst; Eric Carlberg	737
Men's single-shot running deer	1st	Oscar Swahn	25
Men's single-shot running deer	11th	Ernst Rosell	17
Men's double-shot running deer	3rd	Oscar Swahn	38
Men's double-shot running deer	8th	Ernst Rosell	27
Men's team single-shot running deer	1st	Alfred Swahn; G. Arvid Knöppel; Oscar Swahn; Ernst Rosell	86
Men's individual pistol	18th	Frans-Albert Schartau	436
Men's individual pistol	20th	Vilhelm Carlberg	432
Men's individual pistol	27th	Johan Hübner von Holst	408
Men's individual pistol	33rd	Eric Carlberg	396
Men's individual pistol	35th	Otto von Rosen	386
Men's team pistol	5th	Vilhelm Carlberg; Eric Carlberg; Johan Hübner von Holst; Frans-Albert Schartau	1732
Men's individual trap shooting	25th	Alfred Swahn	22
Men's individual trap shooting	27th	Edward Benedicks	19

== Swimming ==
Event	Place	Swimmer	Heats	Semifinals	Final
Men's 100 metre freestyle	3rd	Harald Julin	1:12.0; 1st, heat 4	1:10.2; 2nd, semifinal 1	1:08.0
Men's 100 metre freestyle	Heats	Robert Andersson	Unknown; 3-5, heat 3	Did not advance	
Men's 400 metre freestyle	Heats	Robert Andersson	6:28.0; 2nd, heat 2	Did not advance	
Men's 400 metre freestyle	Heats	Vilhelm Andersson	Unknown; 4th, heat 1	Did not advance	
Men's 1500 metre freestyle	Heats	Gunnar Wennerström	27:15.4; 2nd, heat 1	Did not advance	
Men's 1500 metre freestyle	Heats	Gustaf Wretman	28:40.8; 3rd, heat 6	Did not advance	
Men's 1500 metre freestyle	Heats	Vilhelm Andersson	27:34.4; 4th, heat 2	Did not advance	
Men's 100 metre backstroke	Heats	Gustaf Wretman	Unknown; 3rd, heat 6	Did not advance	
Men's 200 metre breaststroke	3rd	Pontus Hanson	3:15.0; 2nd, heat 4	3:13.0; 2nd, semifinal 2	3:14.6
Men's 200 metre breaststroke	Semi- finalist	Wilhelm Persson	3:17.6; 1st, heat 2	Unknown; 3rd, semifinal 2	Did not advance
Men's 200 metre breaststroke	Heats	Hjalmar Johansson	3:21.2; 2nd, heat 3	Did not advance	
Men's 200 metre breaststroke	Heats	Per Fjästad	3:31.4; 2nd, heat 5	Did not advance	
Men's 200 metre breaststroke	Heats	Torsten Kumfeldt	3:24.6; 2nd, heat 6	Did not advance	
Men's 200 metre breaststroke	Heats	Max Gumpel	Unknown; 3rd, heat 1	Did not advance	
Men's 200 metre breaststroke	Heats	Adolf Andersson	Unknown; 3rd, heat 7	Did not advance	
Men's 4x200 metre freestyle relay	Semi- finalist	Gustaf Wretman; Gunnar Wennerström; Harald Julin; Adolf Andersson	None held	Unknown; 3rd, semifinal 2	Did not advance

== Tennis ==
Sweden was Great Britain's only competitor in the indoor tennis events, taking two bronze medals.

Event	Place	Name	Round of 16	Quarter- finals	Semi- finals	Final
Men's indoor singles	5th	Wollmar Boström	Bye	Lost to Eaves	Did not advance	
Men's indoor singles	5th	Gunnar Setterwall	Defeated Escombe	Lost to Caridia	Did not advance	
Women's indoor singles	3rd	Märtha Adlerstråhle	None held	Bye	Lost to Greene	Did not advance
Women's indoor singles	4th	Elsa Wallenberg	None held	Defeated Coles	Lost to Eastlake-Smith	Did not advance
Men's indoor doubles	3rd	Wollmar Boström; Gunnar Setterwall	None held	Bye	Lost to Caridia/Simond	Did not advance

Opponent nation	Wins	Losses	Percent
Great Britain	3	5	.375
Total international	3	5	.375
Sweden	1	1	.500
Total	4	6	.400

== Tug of war ==
Sweden's tug of war team lost in the semifinals (their first match). They did not appear for the bronze medal match, thereby taking 4th place.

Event	Place	Athletes	Quarterfinals	Semifinals	Final
Tug of war	4th	Albrekt Almqwist, Frans Fast, Carl-Emil Johansson, Emil Johansson, Knut Johansson, Karl Krook, Karl-Gustaf Nilsson, Anders Wollgarth	Bye	Lost to Great Britain; Liverpool Police	Did not advance

== Water polo ==
Summary

Team	Event	First round	Semifinal	Final	Rank
Team	Event	Opposition Score	Opposition Score	Opposition Score	Rank
Sweden men	Men's tournament	Bye	Belgium; L 4–8	Did not advance	3rd place, bronze medalist(s)

Event	Place	Water poloists	Quarterfinals	Semifinals	Final
Men's water polo	3rd	Robert Andersson, Erik Bergvall, Pontus Hanson, Harald Julin, Torsten Kumfeldt, Axel Runström, Gunnar Wennerström	Bye	Lost to Belgium; 8-4	Did not advance

== Wrestling ==
Event	Place	Wrestler	Round of 32	Round of 16	Quarter- finals	Semi- finals	Final
Greco-Roman lightweight	4th	Gunnar Persson	Bye	Defeated; Blount	Defeated; Maróthy	Lost to Porro	Lost to Lindén
Greco-Roman lightweight	5th	Gustaf Malmström	Defeated; McKenzie	Defeated; Bruseker	Lost to Porro	Did not advance	
Greco-Roman lightweight	9th	Carl Erik Lund	Bye	Lost to Orlov	Did not advance		
Greco-Roman middleweight	1st	Frithiof Mårtensson	Defeated; Bechynê	Defeated; Bradshaw	Defeated; Larsson	Defeated; Andersen	Defeated; Andersson
Greco-Roman middleweight	2nd	Mauritz Andersson	Defeated; S. Bacon	Defeated; Beck	Defeated; Eriksen	Defeated; Jósepsson	Lost to Mårtensson
Greco-Roman middleweight	5th	Axel Frank	Bye	Defeated; Demin	Lost to Jósepsson	Did not advance	
Greco-Roman middleweight	17th	Harry Challstorp	Lost to Beck	Did not advance			
Greco-Roman light heavyweight	5th	Fritz Larsson	Defeated; Christiansen	Defeated; Wijbrands	Lost to Weckman	Did not advance	

Event	Place	Wrestler	Round of 16	Quarter- finals	Semi- finals	Final
Freestyle middleweight	4th	Carl Andersson	Bye	Defeated; Craige	Lost to Relwyskow	Lost to Beck
Freestyle middleweight	9th	Harry Challstorp	Lost to Relwyskow	Did not advance		

Opponent nation	Wins	Losses	Percent
Bohemia	1	0	1.000
Denmark	5	1	.833
Finland	0	2	.000
Great Britain	5	4	.556
Hungary	1	0	1.000
Italy	0	2	.000
Netherlands	2	0	1.000
Russia	1	1	.500
United States	1	0	1.000
Total international	16	10	.615
Sweden	1	1	.500
Total	17	11	.607

== Sources ==
- Cook, Theodore Andrea (1908). The Fourth Olympiad, Being the Official Report. London: British Olympic Association.
- De Wael, Herman (2001). "Top London 1908 Olympians". Herman's Full Olympians. Archived from the original on 12 July 2006.
- Reyes, Macario (2001). "IV. Olympiad London 1908 Football Tournament". Rec.Sport.Soccer Statistics Foundation.
