= Italy at the 1908 Summer Olympics =

- IOC code: ITA

in London
- Competitors: 68 (all men)
- Flag bearer: Pietro Bragaglia
- Medals Ranked 9th: Gold 2 Silver 2 Bronze 0 Total 4

Summer Olympics appearances (overview)
- 1896; 1900; 1904; 1908; 1912; 1920; 1924; 1928; 1932; 1936; 1948; 1952; 1956; 1960; 1964; 1968; 1972; 1976; 1980; 1984; 1988; 1992; 1996; 2000; 2004; 2008; 2012; 2016; 2020; 2024; 2028

Other related appearances
- 1906 Intercalated Games

Italy competed at the 1908 Summer Olympics in London, England. It was the third appearance of the European nation, which had not competed at the 1904 Summer Olympics. It was originally going to host the Games, but the eruption of Mount Vesuvius meant the UK hosted them.

== Medalists ==
Medal	Name	Sport	Event
Gold	Alberto Braglia	Gymnastics	All-around
Gold	Enrico Porro	Wrestling	Greco-Roman lightweight
Silver	Emilio Lunghi	Athletics	800 metres
Silver	Marcello Bertinetti; Riccardo Nowak; Abelardo Olivier; Alessandro Pirzio Biroli; Sante Ceccherini	Fencing	Team Sabre

== Results by event ==
=== Athletics ===
Italy's best athletics result was Emilio Lunghi's silver medal in the 800 metres. Dorando Pietri's first-place finish in the marathon was erased by disqualification as a pair of race officials had helped him across the finish line.

Event	Place	Athlete	Heats	Semifinals	Final
Men's 100 metres	Heats	Gaspare Torretta	12.0 seconds 2nd, heat 16	Did not advance	
Men's 100 metres	Heats	Umberto Barrozzi	Unknown; 4th, heat 7	Did not advance	
Men's 200 metres	Heats	Umberto Barrozzi	Unknown; 2nd, heat 8	Did not advance	
Men's 200 metres	Heats	Emilio Brambilla	Unknown; 5th, heat 11	Did not advance	
Men's 400 metres	Heats	Roberto Penna	Unknown; 2nd, heat 4	Did not advance	
Men's 400 metres	Heats	Massimo Cartasegna	Unknown; 2nd, heat 10	Did not advance	
Men's 400 metres	Heats	Giuseppe Tarella	Unknown; 3rd, heat 11	Did not advance	
Men's 800 metres	2nd	Emilio Lunghi	None held	1:57.2; 1st, semifinal 4	1:54.2
Men's 1500 metres	Semi- finalist	Emilio Lunghi	None held	Unknown; 2nd, semifinal 3	Did not advance
Men's 1500 metres	—	Massimo Cartasegna	None held	Did not finish —, semifinal 3	Did not advance
Men's 3200 metre steeplechase	Semi- finalist	Massimo Cartasegna	None held	Unknown; 2nd, semifinal 1	Did not advance
Men's 3 mile team race	—	Pericle Pagliani	None held	15:22.6; 5 points, team=X	Did not advance
Men's 3 mile team race	—	Massimo Cartasegna	None held	16:26.0; 6 points, team=X	Did not advance
Men's 3 mile team race	—	Dorando Pietri	None held	Did not finish No score, team=X	Did not advance
Men's 3 mile team race	—	Emilio Giovanoli	None held	Did not finish No score, team=X	Did not advance
Men's 3 mile team race	—	Emilio Lunghi	None held	Did not finish No score, team=X	Did not advance
Men's 5 miles	Semi- finalist	Pericle Pagliani	None held	Unknown; 3rd, semifinal 2	Did not advance
Men's marathon	—	Dorando Pietri	None held		Disqualified
Men's marathon	—	Umberto Blasi	None held		Did not finish
Men's marathon	—	Augusto Cocca	None held		Did not start

Event	Place	Athlete	Distance
Men's discus throw	12-42	Umberto Avattaneo	Unknown
Men's Greek discus	10th	Umberto Avattaneo	29.15 metres
Men's freestyle javelin	10-33	Emilio Brambilla	Unknown

=== Cycling ===
No Italian cyclist advanced to the finals in any event. Morisetti's second-place finish in the fourth semifinal of the sprint was the best performance by an Italian cyclist.

Event	Place	Cyclist	Heats	Semifinals	Final
Men's 5000 metres	Semi- finalist	Guglielmo Malatesta	None held	Unknown; 3rd, semifinal 1	Did not advance
Men's 5000 metres	Semi- finalist	Cesare Zanzottera	None held	Unknown; 3rd, semifinal 5	Did not advance
Men's 5000 metres	Semi- finalist	Guglielmo Morisetti	None held	Unknown; 3rd, semifinal 6	Did not advance
Men's 20 kilometres	Semi- finalist	Guglielmo Morisetti	None held	Unknown; 4th, semifinal 6	Did not advance
Men's 100 kilometres	—	Cesare Zanzottera	None held	Did not finish —, semifinal 2	Did not advance
Men's 100 kilometres	—	Guglielmo Malatesta	None held	Did not finish —, semifinal 2	Did not advance
Men's 100 kilometres	—	Battista Parini	None held	Did not finish —, semifinal 2	Did not advance
Men's sprint	Semi- finalist	Guglielmo Morisetti	1:21.4; 1st, heat 11	Unknown; 2nd, semifinal 4	Did not advance
Men's sprint	Heats	Guglielmo Malatesta	Unknown; 3rd, heat 1	Did not advance	

=== Diving ===
Event	Place	Diver	Preliminary groups	Semi- finals	Final
Men's 3 metre springboard	19th	Carlo Bonfanti	65.80 points 4th, group 4	Did not advance	

=== Fencing ===
Event	Place	Fencer	First round	Second round	Semi- final	Final
Men's épée	Second round	Riccardo Nowak	3-2 (3rd in L)	2-3 (3rd in 6)	Did not advance	
Men's épée	Second round	Giulio Cagiati	4-2 (2nd in F)	1-2 (3rd in 8)	Did not advance	
Men's épée	Second round	Pietro Speciale	3-3 (3rd in B)	1-3 (4th in 3)	Did not advance	
Men's épée	Second round	Marcelo Bertinetti	3-1 (1st in K)	1-3 (4th in 5)	Did not advance	
Men's épée	First round	Dino Diana	4-4 (4th in D)	Did not advance		
Men's épée	First round	Sante Ceccherini	4-4 (4th in E)	Did not advance		
Men's épée	First round	Giuseppe Mangiarotti	5-3 (4th in I)	Did not advance		
Men's épée	First round	Pietro Sarzano	2-4 (4th in J)	Did not advance		
Men's épée	First round	Alessandro Pirzio Biroli	3-4 (5th in H)	Did not advance		
Men's sabre	Semi- finalist	Marcelo Bertinetti	4-1 (1st in H)	4-0 (1st in 7)	3-4 (5th in 1)	Did not advance
Men's sabre	Semi- finalist	Sante Ceccherini	4-1 (2nd in G)	3-1 (2nd in 5)	0-7 (8th in 2)	Did not advance
Men's sabre	Second round	Riccardo Nowak	4-2 (2nd in M)	1-3 (4th in 3)	Did not advance	
Men's sabre	Second round	Alessandro Pirzio Biroli	2-1 (1st in E)	1-3 (4th in 7)	Did not advance	
Men's sabre	First round	Dino Diana	2-3 (5th in C)	Did not advance		
Men's sabre	First round	Arolodo Pinelli	2-3 (5th in K)	Did not advance		
Men's sabre	First round	Pietro Sarzano	2-4 (6th in J)	Did not advance		

Event	Place	Fencers	Play-in match	First round	Semi- finals	Final	Repechage	Silver medal match
Men's team épée	4th	Marcelo Bertinetti; Giuseppe Mangiarotti; Riccardo Nowak; Abelardo Olivier	Bye	Defeated Bohemia; 12-7 Advanced to semifinals	Lost to Belgium; 9-8 Out; 4th place	Did not advance	Not relegated	
Men's team sabre	2nd	Marcello Bertinetti (all); Riccardo Nowak (rep); Abelardo Olivier (all); Alessandro Pirzio-Biroli (all) Sante Ceccherini (1st, sf)	Not held	Defeated Great Britain; 11-5 Advanced to semifinals	Lost to Hungary; 11-5 Relegated to repechage	Did not advance	Defeated Germany; 10-4 Advanced to silver medal match	Defeated Bohemia; Walkover Won silver medal

=== Gymnastics ===
Gymnast	Event	Score	Rank
Alberto Braglia	Men's all-around	317	1st place, gold medalist(s)
Guido Romano	Men's all-around	230	19
Otello Capitani	Men's all-around	226.75	21

Event	Place	Gymnast	Score
Men's team	6th	Alfredo Accorsi, Nemo Agodi, Umberto Agliorini, Adriano Andreani, Vincenzo Blo, Flaminio Bottoni, Bruto Buozzi, Giovanni Bonati, Pietro Borsetti, Adamo Bozzani, Gastone Calabresi, Carlo Celada, Tito Collevati, Antonio Cotichini, Guido Cristofori, Stanislao Di Chiara, Giovanni Gasperini, Amedeo Marchi, Carlo Marchiandi, Ettore Massari, Roberto Nardini, Gaetano Preti, Decio Pavarri, Gino Ravenna, Massimo Ridolfi, Gustavo Taddia, Gianetto Termanini, Ugo Savanuzzi, Gioacchino Vaccari	316

=== Rowing ===
Event	Place	Rowers	First round	Quarter- finals	Semi- finals	Final
Men's single sculls	5th	Gino Ciabatti	Bye	Unknown; 2nd, quarterfinal 2	Did not advance	

=== Swimming ===
Event	Place	Swimmer	Heats	Semifinals	Final
Men's 100 metre freestyle	Heats	Davide Baiardo	Unknown; 3–6, heat 1	Did not advance	
Men's 400 metre freestyle	Heats	Mario Massa	Unknown; 3rd, heat 6	Did not advance	
Men's 400 metre freestyle	—	Davide Baiardo	Did not finish —, heat 4	Did not advance	
Men's 1500 metre freestyle	Heats	Oreste Muzzi	28:52.6; 3rd, heat 1	Did not advance	
Men's 100 metre backstroke	Heats	Amilcare Beretta	Unknown; 3rd, heat 4	Did not advance	
Men's 200 metre breaststroke	Heats	Amilcare Beretta	Unknown; 4th, heat 4	Did not advance	

=== Wrestling ===
Italy's lone wrestler in 1908 was undefeated in his four bouts, winning each match to win the gold medal in the Greco-Roman lightweight class.

Event	Place	Wrestler	Round of 32	Round of 16	Quarter- finals	Semi- finals	Final
Greco-Roman lightweight	1st	Enrico Porro	Bye	Defeated; Téger	Defeated; Malmström	Defeated; Persson	Defeated; Orlov

Opponent nation	Wins	Losses	Percent
Hungary	1	0	1.000
Russia	1	0	1.000
Sweden	2	0	1.000
Total	4	0	1.000

== Bibliography ==
- Cook, Theodore Andrea (1908). The Fourth Olympiad, Being the Official Report. London: British Olympic Association.
- De Wael, Herman (2001). "Top London 1908 Olympians". Herman's Full Olympians. Archived from the original on 12 July 2006.
