= Gymnastics at the 1908 Summer Olympics – Men's team =

Men's team gymnastics at the Games of the IV Olympiad
- Venue: White City Stadium
- Dates: July 14–16, 1908
- Competitors: 254 from 8 nations

Medalists
1st place, gold medalist(s)		Sweden
2nd place, silver medalist(s)		Norway
3rd place, bronze medalist(s)		Finland

The men's team was one of two gymnastics events on the Gymnastics at the 1908 Summer Olympics programme.

== Competition format ==
Each team was composed of between 16 and 40 gymnasts, with a time limit of 30 minutes for the performance. Free gymnastics and hand apparati were allowed. There were three judges for each performance, each giving a score of up to 160 divided as follows: 40 points for "appearance and march of the competitors," 60 points for "precision of movement, style, etc.," and 60 points for "physiological and rational combination of the exercises executed." The judges' scores were summed. A total of 480 points was possible.

== Results ==
Place	Nation	Score
1	Sweden	438
2	Norway	425
3	Finland	405
4	Denmark	378
5	France	319
6	Italy	316
7	Netherlands	297
8	Great Britain	196

== Team rosters ==
=== Sweden ===
- Gösta Åsbrink
- Carl Bertilsson
- Hjalmar Cedercrona
- Andreas Cervin
- Rudolf Degermark
- Carl Folcker
- Sven Forssman
- Erik Granfelt
- Carl Hårleman
- Nils Hellsten
- Gunnar Höjer
- Arvid Holmberg
- Carl Holmberg
- Oswald Holmberg
- Hugo Jahnke
- John Jarlén
- Gustaf Johnsson (later Weidel)
- Rolf Johnsson
- Nils von Kantzow
- Sven Landberg
- Olle Lanner
- Axel Ljung
- Osvald Moberg
- Carl Martin Norberg
- Erik Norberg
- Tor Norberg
- Axel Norling
- Daniel Norling
- Gösta Olson
- Leonard Peterson
- Sven Rosén
- Gustaf Rosenquist
- Axel Sjöblom
- Birger Sörvik
- Haakon Sörvik
- Karl Johan Svensson
- Karl Gustaf Vinqvist
- Nils Widforss

=== Norway ===
- Arthur Amundsen
- Carl Albert Andersen
- Otto Authén
- Hermann Bohne
- Trygve Bøyesen
- Oskar Bye
- Conrad Carlsrud
- Sverre Grøner
- Harald Halvorsen
- Harald Hansen
- Petter Hol
- Eugen Ingebretsen
- Ole Iversen
- Per Mathias Jespersen
- Sigurd Johannessen
- Nicolai Kiær
- Carl Klæth
- Thor Larsen
- Rolf Lefdahl
- Hans Lem
- Anders Moen
- Frithjof Olsen
- Carl Alfred Pedersen
- Paul Pedersen
- Sigvard Sivertsen
- John Skrataas
- Harald Smedvik
- Andreas Strand
- Olaf Syvertsen
- Thomas Thorstensen

=== Finland ===
- Eino Forsström
- Otto Granström
- Johan Kemp
- Iivari Kyykoski
- Heikki Lehmusto
- John Lindroth
- Yrjö Linko
- Edvard Linna
- Matti Markkanen
- Kalle Mikkolainen
- Veli Nieminen
- Kalle Kustaa Paasia
- Arvi Pohjanpää
- Aarne Pohjonen
- Eino Railio
- Ale Riipinen
- Arno Saarinen
- Einar Sahlstein
- Aarne Salovaara
- Torsten Sandelin
- Elis Sipilä
- Viktor Smeds
- Kaarlo Soinio
- Kurt Stenberg
- Väinö Tiiri
- Magnus Wegelius

=== Denmark ===
- Carl Andersen
- Hans Bredmose
- Jens Chievitz
- Arvor Hansen
- Christian Hansen
- Ingvardt Hansen
- Einar Hermann
- Knud Holm
- Poul Holm
- Oluf Husted-Nielsen
- Charles Jensen
- Gorm Jensen
- Hendrik Johansen
- Harald Klem
- Robert Madsen
- Vigo Madsen
- Lukas Nielsen
- Oluf Olsson
- Niels Petersen
- Nicolai Philipsen
- Hendrik Rasmussen
- Viktor Rasmussen
- Marius Thuesen
- Niels Turin Nielsen

=== France ===
- Léon Bogart
- Albert Borizée
- Henri de Breyne
- Nicolas Constant
- Charles Courtois
- Louis Delattre
- Antoine Delescluse
- Louis Delescluse
- Georges Demarle
- Joseph Derou
- Charles Desmarcheliers
- Camille Desmarcheliers
- Édmond Dharancy
- Georges Donnet
- Émile Duhamel
- A. Duponcheel
- Paul Durin
- Alphonse Eggremont
- G. Guiot
- L. Hennebicq
- Henri Hubert
- Désiré Hudelo
- E. Labitte
- L. Lestienne
- Raimond Lis
- Victor Magnier
- G. Nys
- Joseph Parent
- Louis Pappe
- Victor Polidori
- Gustave Pottier
- Antoine Pinoy
- Louis Sandray
- Édouard Schmoll
- Émile Steffe
- E. Vercruysse
- Hugo Vergin
- Ernest Vicogne
- Jules Walmée
- G. Warlouzer

=== Italy ===
- Alfredo Accorsi
- Nemo Agodi
- Umberto Agliorini
- Adriano Andreani
- Vincenzo Blo
- Flaminio Bottoni
- Bruto Buozzi
- Giovanni Bonati
- Pietro Borsetti
- Adamo Bozzani
- Gastone Calabresi
- Carlo Celada
- Tito Collevati
- Antonio Cotichini
- Guido Cristofori
- Stanislao Di Chiara
- Giovanni Gasperini
- Amedeo Marchi
- Carlo Marchiandi
- Ettore Massari
- Roberto Nardini
- Gaetano Preti
- Decio Pavani
- Gino Ravenna
- Massimo Ridolfi
- Gustavo Taddia
- Giannetto Termanini
- Ugo Savonuzzi
- Gioacchino Vaccari

=== Netherlands ===
- Cornelus Becker
- Michel Biet
- Reinier Blom
- Jan de Boer
- Jan Bolt
- Emanuel Brouwer
- Constantijn van Daalen
- Johann Flemer
- Johannes Göckel
- Isidore Goudeket
- Dirk Janssen
- Jan Jacob Kieft
- Salomon Konijn
- Herman van Leeuwen
- Abraham Mok
- Abraham de Oliveira
- Johannes Posthumus
- Johan Schmitt
- Jonas Slier
- Johannes Stikkelman
- Hendricus Thijsen
- Gerardus Wesling

=== Great Britain ===
- Percy Baker
- Robert Bonney
- Henry Cattley
- Mellor Clay
- Edward Clough
- James Cotterell
- William Cowhig
- G. C. Cullen
- Frank Denby
- Herbert Drury
- W. Fitt
- Harry Gill
- Arthur Harley
- Albert Hawkins
- William Hoare
- J. A. Horridge
- Henry Huskinson
- J. W. Jones
- E. Justice
- N. J. Keighley
- Robert Laycock
- Robert McGaw
- J. McPhail
- W. Manning
- W. G. Merrifield
- Charles Oldaker
- G. Parrott
- E. Parsons
- Edward Richardson
- Irven Robertshaw
- George Ross
- David Scott
- J. F. Simpson
- Walter Skeeles
- Joshua Speight
- Herbert Stell
- Charles Sederman
- William Titt
- Charles Vigurs
- Enos Walton
- H. Waterman
- Edgar Watkins
- John Whitaker
- F. Whitehead

== Sources ==
- Cook, Theodore Andrea (1908). The Fourth Olympiad, Being the Official Report. London: British Olympic Association.
- De Wael, Herman (2001). "Gymnastics 1908". Herman's Full Olympians. Archived from the original on 23 February 2005.
