= Vingqvist =

Vingqvist or Wingqvist is a Swedish surname. Notable people with the surname include:

- Karl-Gustaf Vingqvist (1883–1967), Swedish gymnast
- Sven Gustaf Wingqvist (1876–1953), Swedish engineer, inventor, and industrialist
