= Degermark =

Degermark is a Swedish surname. Notable people with the surname include:

- Pia Degermark (born 1949), Swedish actress
- Rudolf Degermark (1886–1960), Swedish gymnast
