= Oluf Husted-Nielsen =

Danish artistic gymnast

- Born: 9 December 1888 Copenhagen, Denmark
- Died: 8 July 1972 (aged 83) Copenhagen, Denmark

Gymnastics career
- Discipline: Men's artistic gymnastics
- Country represented: Denmark

Oluf Husted-Nielsen (9 December 1888 – 8 July 1972) was a Danish gymnast who competed in the 1908 Summer Olympics. In 1908 he finished fourth with the Danish team in the team competition.
