= Harry Gill (gymnast) =

British gymnast (1881–1968)

- Born: 1881 Leominster, England
- Died: 1968 (aged 86–87) Wales

Gymnastics career
- Discipline: Men's artistic gymnastics
- Country represented: (United Kingdom) Great Britain

Harry Gill (1881 – 1968) was a British gymnast. He competed in the men's team event at the 1908 Summer Olympics.

Gill was a member of the Powell's Tillery Gymnastics Club of Abertillery, formed in 1903, and is recorded as a member of the team in 1904, in which year he was a member of the team that competed in the club's first competition, against a team from Newport. He captained the Powell's Tillery team that won the Welsh Amateur Gymnastics Shield in 1906 and the team that were runners-up in 1907. He subsequently became an instructor.

He was a member of the Abertillery District Council from 1931 to 1934. In 1936, he was sentenced to twelve months imprisonment after being found guilty on fifty counts of embezzlement during his time as secretary of Powell's Tillery team.
