= Camille Desmarcheliers =

French gymnast

- Full name: Camille Achille Desmarcheliers
- Born: 13 August 1884 Forest, Wallonia, Frasnes-lez-Anvaing, Belgium
- Died: 11 October 1914 (aged 30) Champlon, Meuse, France

Gymnastics career
- Discipline: Men's artistic gymnastics
- Country represented: France
- Gym: Société de Gymnastique La Patriote de Croix

Camille Achille Desmarcheliers (13 August 1884 – 11 October 1914) was a French gymnast. He competed in the men's team event at the 1908 Summer Olympics. He was killed in action during World War I.
