= Robert McGaw =

Scottish gymnast (1875–1945)

- Born: 14 February 1875 Kirkcolm, Scotland
- Died: 18 June 1945 (aged 70) Glasgow, Scotland

Gymnastics career
- Discipline: Men's artistic gymnastics
- Country represented: (United Kingdom) Great Britain

Robert McGaw (14 February 1875 – 18 June 1945) was a Scottish gymnast. He competed in the men's team all-around event at the 1908 Summer Olympics.
