= Raimond Lis =

French gymnast

- Full name: Raimond Auguste Lis
- Born: 30 August 1888 Armentières, France
- Died: 21 December 1916 (aged 28) Villers-Bretonneux, France

Gymnastics career
- Discipline: Men's artistic gymnastics
- Country represented: France

Raimond Auguste Lis (30 August 1888 – 21 December 1916) was a French gymnast. He competed in the men's team event at the 1908 Summer Olympics.

Lis was a gymnastics teacher and a multi-time regional champion in Belgium.

Lis was also a lieutenant in the army and he was killed in the action during World War I.
