= Jens Chievitz =

Danish gymnast (1889–1965)

- Full name: William Poul Jens Chievitz
- Born: 1 January 1889 Copenhagen, Denmark
- Died: 28 February 1965 (aged 76) Canton, Ohio, US

Gymnastics career
- Discipline: Men's artistic gymnastics
- Country represented: Denmark

William Poul Jens Chievitz (1 January 1889 in Copenhagen, Denmark – 28 February 1965 in Canton, Ohio, US) was a Danish gymnast who competed in the 1908 Summer Olympics. In 1908, he finished fourth with the Danish team in the team competition.

At club level, he was a part of Gymnastik- og Svømmeforeningen Hermes in Frederiksberg.
