= Albert Hawkins =

Welsh gymnast (1886–1969)

- Full name: Albert Edward Hawkins
- Born: 21 May 1886 Abertillery, Wales
- Died: 1969 (aged 82–83) Glamorgan, Wales

Gymnastics career
- Discipline: Men's artistic gymnastics
- Country represented: (United Kingdom) Great Britain

Albert Edward Hawkins (21 May 1886 – 1969) was a Welsh gymnast. He competed in the men's team all-around event at the 1908 Summer Olympics.
