= Walter Skeeles =

British gymnast (1887–1972)

- Full name: Walter Richard Skeeles
- Born: 17 October 1887 London, England
- Died: 21 October 1972 (aged 85) Cape Town, South Africa

Gymnastics career
- Discipline: Men's artistic gymnastics
- Country represented: (United Kingdom) Great Britain

Walter Richard Skeeles (17 October 1887 – 21 October 1972) was a British gymnast. He competed in the men's team all-around event at the 1908 Summer Olympics.
