= Robert Laycock (gymnast) =

British gymnast (1880–1956)

- Born: 10 September 1880 Holbeck, England
- Died: 4 November 1956 (aged 76) Garforth, England

Gymnastics career
- Discipline: Men's artistic gymnastics
- Country represented: (United Kingdom) Great Britain

Robert Laycock (10 September 1880 – 4 November 1956) was a British gymnast. He competed in the men's team all-around event at the 1908 Summer Olympics.
