= Joshua Speight =

British gymnast (1881–1952)

- Born: 8 February 1881 Ovenden, England
- Died: 18 October 1952 (aged 71) Bradford, England

Gymnastics career
- Discipline: Men's artistic gymnastics
- Country represented: (United Kingdom) Great Britain

Joshua Speight (8 February 1881 – 18 October 1952) was a British gymnast. He competed in the men's team all-around event at the 1908 Summer Olympics.
