= Irven Robertshaw =

British gymnast (1883–1970)

- Born: 26 November 1883 Thornton, West Yorkshire, England
- Died: 1970 (aged 86–87) Yorkshire, England

Gymnastics career
- Discipline: Men's artistic gymnastics
- Country represented: (United Kingdom) Great Britain

Irven Robertshaw (26 November 1883 – 1970) was a British gymnast. He competed in the men's team all-around event at the 1908 Summer Olympics.
