= Herbert Stell =

British gymnast (1885–1967)

- Full name: Herbert Stell
- Born: 3 November 1885 Midgley, West Yorkshire, England
- Died: 6 May 1967 (aged 81) Liverpool, England

Gymnastics career
- Discipline: Men's artistic gymnastics
- Country represented: (United Kingdom) Great Britain

Herbert Stell (3 November 1885 – 6 May 1967) was a gymnast who represented Great Britain at the 1908 Summer Olympics.

Stell was one of the 45 gymnasts who competed in the men's team event in London at the 1908 Summer Olympics. The team finished eighth out of the eight teams.

After the Olympics, Stell became a physical education instructor at the Liverpool Institute High School for Boys and eventually became head of the department, a position he held for 35 years.
