= Henry Huskinson =

British gymnast (1890–1963)

- Full name: Henry John Huskinson
- Born: 19 January 1890 Birmingham, England
- Died: 4 July 1963 (aged 73) York, England

Gymnastics career
- Discipline: Men's artistic gymnastics
- Country represented: (United Kingdom) Great Britain

Henry John Huskinson (19 January 1890 – 4 July 1963) was a British gymnast. He competed in the men's team all-around event at the 1908 Summer Olympics.
