= Gorm Jensen =

Danish artistic gymnast

- Full name: Gorm Decem Jensen
- Born: 2 January 1886 Faaborg, Denmark
- Died: 1 January 1968 (aged 81) Hasseris, Denmark

Gymnastics career
- Discipline: Men's artistic gymnastics
- Country represented: Denmark

Gorm Decem Jensen (2 January 1886 – 1 January 1968) was a Danish gymnast who competed in the 1908 Summer Olympics. In 1908 he finished fourth with the Danish team in the team competition.
