= Edward Richardson (gymnast) =

British gymnast (1879–1961)

- Full name: Edward Frank Richardson
- Born: 1 May 1879 London, England
- Died: 16 April 1961 (aged 81) Buckingham, England

Gymnastics career
- Discipline: Men's artistic gymnastics
- Country represented: (United Kingdom) Great Britain

Edward Frank Richardson (1 May 1879 – 16 April 1961) was a British gymnast. He competed in the men's team all-around event at the 1908 Summer Olympics.
