= Henry Cattley =

British gymnast (1887–1961)

- Full name: John Henry Cattley
- Born: 26 April 1887 Stoke Newington, England
- Died: 4 April 1961 (aged 73) Worthing, England

Gymnastics career
- Discipline: Men's artistic gymnastics
- Country represented: (United Kingdom) Great Britain

John Henry Cattley (26 April 1887 – 4 April 1961) was a British gymnast. He competed in the men's team all-around event at the 1908 Summer Olympics.
