= Stanislao Di Chiara =

Italian artistic gymnast

- Born: 24 December 1891 Montegranaro, Kingdom of Italy
- Died: 10 September 1973 (aged 81) Ferrara, Italy

Gymnastics career
- Discipline: Men's artistic gymnastics
- Country represented: Italy

Stanislao Di Chiara (December 24, 1891 – September 10, 1973) was an Italian gymnast who competed in the 1908 Summer Olympics. He was born in Montegranaro, Ferrara. In 1908 he finished sixth with the Italian team in the team competition.
