= Nemo Agodi =

Italian gymnast (1888–1940)

- Born: 10 January 1888 Ferrara, Kingdom of Italy
- Died: 20 January 1940 (aged 52) Ferrara, Kingdom of Italy

Gymnastics career
- Discipline: Men's artistic gymnastics
- Country represented: Italy
- Gym: Palestra Ginnastica Ferrara

Nemo Agodi (10 January 1888 – 20 January 1940) was an Italian gymnast who competed in the 1908 Summer Olympics. In 1908 he finished sixth with the Italian team in the team competition.
