= Gino Ravenna =

Italian gymnast

- Born: 30 August 1889 Ferrara, Kingdom of Italy
- Died: 30 April 1944 (aged 54) Oświęcim, Nazi Germany

Gymnastics career
- Discipline: Men's artistic gymnastics
- Country represented: Italy

Gino Ravenna (30 August 1889 – 30 April 1944) was an Italian gymnast. He competed in the men's team event at the 1908 Summer Olympics. He was killed in the Auschwitz concentration camp during World War II.
