= Tito Collevati =

Italian artistic gymnast

- Full name: Antonio Collevati
- Born: 4 February 1891 Voghiera, Kingdom of Italy
- Died: 25 February 1941 (aged 50) Ferrara, Kingdom of Italy

Gymnastics career
- Discipline: Men's artistic gymnastics
- Country represented: Italy
- Club: Palestra Ginnastica Ferrara

Antonio "Tito" Collevati (February 4, 1891 – February 25, 1941) was an Italian gymnast who competed in the 1908 Summer Olympics. In 1908 he finished sixth with the Italian team in the team competition.
