= Pietro Borsetti =

Italian gymnast

- Born: March 6, 1882
- Died: October 17, 1955 (aged 73)

Gymnastics career
- Country represented: Italy

Pietro Borsetti (March 6, 1882 – October 17, 1955) was an Italian gymnast who competed in the 1908 Summer Olympics. In 1908 he finished sixth with the Italian team in the team competition.
