= Giovanni Gasperini =

Italian artistic gymnast

- Born: 6 March 1886 Ferrara, Kingdom of Italy

Gymnastics career
- Discipline: Men's artistic gymnastics
- Country represented: Italy

Giovanni Gasperini (born March 6, 1886, date of death unknown) was an Italian gymnast who competed in the 1908 Summer Olympics. In 1908 he finished sixth with the Italian team in the team competition.
