= Amedeo Marchi =

Italian gymnast

- Born: 8 February 1889 Ferrara, Kingdom of Italy
- Died: 6 October 1968 (aged 79) Ferrara, Italy

Gymnastics career
- Discipline: Men's artistic gymnastics
- Country represented: Italy

Amedeo Marchi (8 February 1889 – 6 October 1968) was an Italian gymnast who competed in the 1908 Summer Olympics. In 1908, he finished sixth with the Italian team in the team competition.
