= Adriano Andreani =

Italian gymnast

- Born: 14 September 1879 Ferrara, Kingdom of Italy
- Died: 22 October 1960 (aged 81) Ferrara, Italy

Gymnastics career
- Discipline: Men's artistic gymnastics
- Country represented: Italy
- Gym: Palestra Ginnastica Ferrara

Adriano Andreani (14 September 1879 – 22 October 1960) was an Italian gymnast. He competed in the men's team event at the 1908 Summer Olympics.
