= Sigurd Johannessen =

Norwegian gymnast (1884–1974)

- Full name: Sigurd Erhardt Amandus Johannessen
- Born: 9 January 1884 Skien, United Kingdoms of Sweden and Norway
- Died: 7 February 1974 (aged 90) Skien, Norway

Gymnastics career
- Discipline: Men's artistic gymnastics
- Country represented: Norway
- Club: Odds Ballklubb
Medal record
Men's artistic gymnastics
Representing Norway
Olympic Games
Silver medal – second place	1908 London	Team

Sigurd Erhardt Amandus Johannessen (9 January 1884 – 7 February 1974) was a Norwegian gymnast who competed in the 1908 Summer Olympics. As a member of the Norwegian team, he won the silver medal in the gymnastics team event in 1908.
