= Eino Railio =

Finnish artistic gymnast

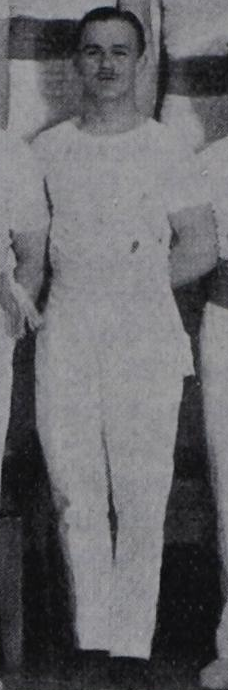
- Railio in 1916

Personal information
- Full name: Johan Einar Railio
- Alternative name: Johan Einar Dahlgren
- Born: 11 June 1886 Helsinki, Grand Duchy of Finland, Russian Empire
- Died: 3 February 1970 (aged 83) Helsinki, Finland

Gymnastics career
- Discipline: Men's artistic gymnastics
- Country represented: Finland
- Club: Helsingin Kisa-Veikot
Medal record
Men's artistic gymnastics
Representing Finland
Olympic Games
Bronze medal – third place	1908 London	Team

Johan Einar "Eino" Railio (11 June 1886 – 3 February 1970) was a Finnish gymnast who won bronze in the 1908 Summer Olympics.

== Early life ==
Railio was born Johan Einar Dahlgren on 11 June 1886 in Helsinki, Grand Duchy of Finland, Russian Empire. He Finnicized his family name from Dahlgren to Railio in 1906.

== Gymnastics career ==
Eino Railio at the Olympic Games
Games	Event	Rank	Notes
1908 Summer Olympics	Men's team	3rd	Source:

== Personal life ==
Railio married Agnes Lovisa Nikander (née Malm) (1885–1976).

Railio died on 3 February 1970 in Helsinki and is buried in the Malmi Cemetery in Helsinki.
