= Andreas Strand (gymnast) =

Norwegian artistic gymnast

- Born: 4 February 1889 Fredrikstad, United Kingdoms of Sweden and Norway
- Died: 19 April 1958 (aged 69) Glemmen, Norway

Gymnastics career
- Discipline: Men's artistic gymnastics
- Country represented: Norway
- Gym: Fredrikstad Turnforening
Medal record
Men's artistic gymnastics
Representing Norway
Olympic Games
| Silver medal – second place | 1908 London | Team |

Andreas Strand (3 February 1889 – 19 April 1958) was a Norwegian gymnast who competed in the 1908 Summer Olympics. As a member of the Norwegian team, he won the silver medal in the gymnastics team event in 1908.
