= Rolf Lefdahl =

Norwegian artistic gymnast

- Born: 13 August 1882 Kristiania, United Kingdoms of Sweden and Norway
- Died: 15 February 1965 (aged 82) Bærum, Norway

Gymnastics career
- Discipline: Men's artistic gymnastics
- Country represented: Norway
- Gym: Chistiania Turnforening
Medal record
Men's artistic gymnastics
Representing Norway
Olympic Games
| Silver medal – second place | 1908 London | Team |

Rolf Lefdahl (13 August 1882 – 5 February 1965) was a Norwegian gymnast who competed in the 1908 Summer Olympics. As a member of the Norwegian team, he won the silver medal in the gymnastics team event in 1908.
