= Alfredo Accorsi =

Italian gymnast (1881–1951)

- Born: 2 February 1881 Ferrara, Kingdom of Italy
- Died: 5 October 1951 (aged 70) Ferrara, Italy

Gymnastics career
- Discipline: Men's artistic gymnastics
- Country represented: Italy
- Gym: Palestra Ginnastica Ferrara

Alfredo Accorsi (2 February 1881 – 5 October 1951) was an Italian gymnast who competed in the 1908 Summer Olympics.
