= Yrjö Linko =

Finnish artistic gymnast (1885–1934)

- Linko with the 1908 Finland team

Personal information
- Full name: Yrjö Antti Linko
- Born: 1 February 1885 Hanko, Grand Duchy of Finland, Russian Empire
- Died: 22 March 1934 (aged 49) Turku, Finland

Gymnastics career
- Discipline: Men's artistic gymnastics
- Country represented: Finland
- Club: Ylioppilasvoimistelijat
Medal record
Men's artistic gymnastics
Representing Finland
Olympic Games
Bronze medal – third place	1908 London	Team

Yrjö Antti Linko (1 February 1885 – 22 March 1934) was a Finnish gymnast who won bronze at the 1908 Summer Olympics.

== Early life and education ==
Linko was born on 1 February 1885 to senior conductor A. G. Lindholm and Edla Johanna Fredberg. He Finnicized his family name from Lindholm to Linko in 1906. He married Hilja Linnéa Knutsson (1892–) in 1914. He did his matriculation exam in 1905. He graduated as a physiotherapist and a physical education teacher in 1911. He obtained the degree of Licentiate of Medicine in 1913.

== Gymnastics career ==
Linko was a member of the Finnish delegation at the 1908 Summer Olympics. He participated in gymnastics and won a bronze medal in the team event.

Yrjö Linko at the Olympic Games
Games	Event	Rank	Notes
1908 Summer Olympics	Men's team	3rd	Source:

He won the Finnish national championship in team gymnastics as a member of Ylioppilasvoimistelijat in 1909.

== Post-gymnastics life ==
Linko worked as a physician in various places of employment from 1911 and as a physical education teacher in 1912–1913. He served as a physician in the White Guard during and after the Finnish Civil War, reaching the rank of captain (med.) in 1921. He was awarded the Cross of Liberty, 4th Class and the Commemorative medal of Liberation war.

He died of pneumonia on 22 March 1934.
