= Matti Markkanen =

Finnish artistic gymnast

- Markkanen with the 1908 Finland team

Personal information
- Born: 14 May 1887 Kuopio, Grand Duchy of Finland, Russian Empire
- Died: 2 April 1942 (aged 54) Vieremä, Finland

Gymnastics career
- Discipline: Men's artistic gymnastics
- Country represented: Finland
- Club: Ylioppilasvoimistelijat
Medal record
Men's artistic gymnastics
Representing Finland
Olympic Games
Bronze medal – third place	1908 London	Team

Matti Markkanen (14 May 1887 – 2 April 1942) was a Finnish gymnast who won bronze in the 1908 Summer Olympics.

== Early life ==
Markkanen was born on 14 May 1887 to ambulatory school teacher Matti Markkanen and Katrina Kristina Voutilainen.

== Gymnastics career ==
Matti Markkanen at the Olympic Games
Games	Event	Rank	Notes
1908 Summer Olympics	Men's team	3rd	Source:

He won the Finnish national championship in team gymnastics as a member of Ylioppilasvoimistelijat in 1909.

== Post-gymnastics career ==
He was ordained as a priest in 1910. He served as a chaplain in Uukuniemi, Pielavesi, and Lappee from 1913 to 1928 and as a vicar in Vieremä from 1928.

== Personal life ==
He married Aili Nygrén in 1915.
