= Otto Authén =

Norwegian gymnast (1886–1971)

- Full name: Otto Fredrik Authén
- Born: 1 November 1886 Kristiania, United Kingdoms of Sweden and Norway
- Died: 7 July 1971 (aged 84) Oslo, Norway

Gymnastics career
- Discipline: Men's artistic gymnastics
- Country represented: Norway
- Gym: Chistiania Turnforening
Medal record
Men's artistic gymnastics
Representing Norway
Olympic Games
Silver medal – second place	1908 London	Team

Otto Fredrik Authén (1 November 1886 – 7 July 1971) was a Norwegian gymnast who competed in the 1908 Summer Olympics. As a member of the Norwegian team, he won the silver medal in the gymnastics team event in 1908.
