= Olaf Syvertsen =

Norwegian artistic gymnast

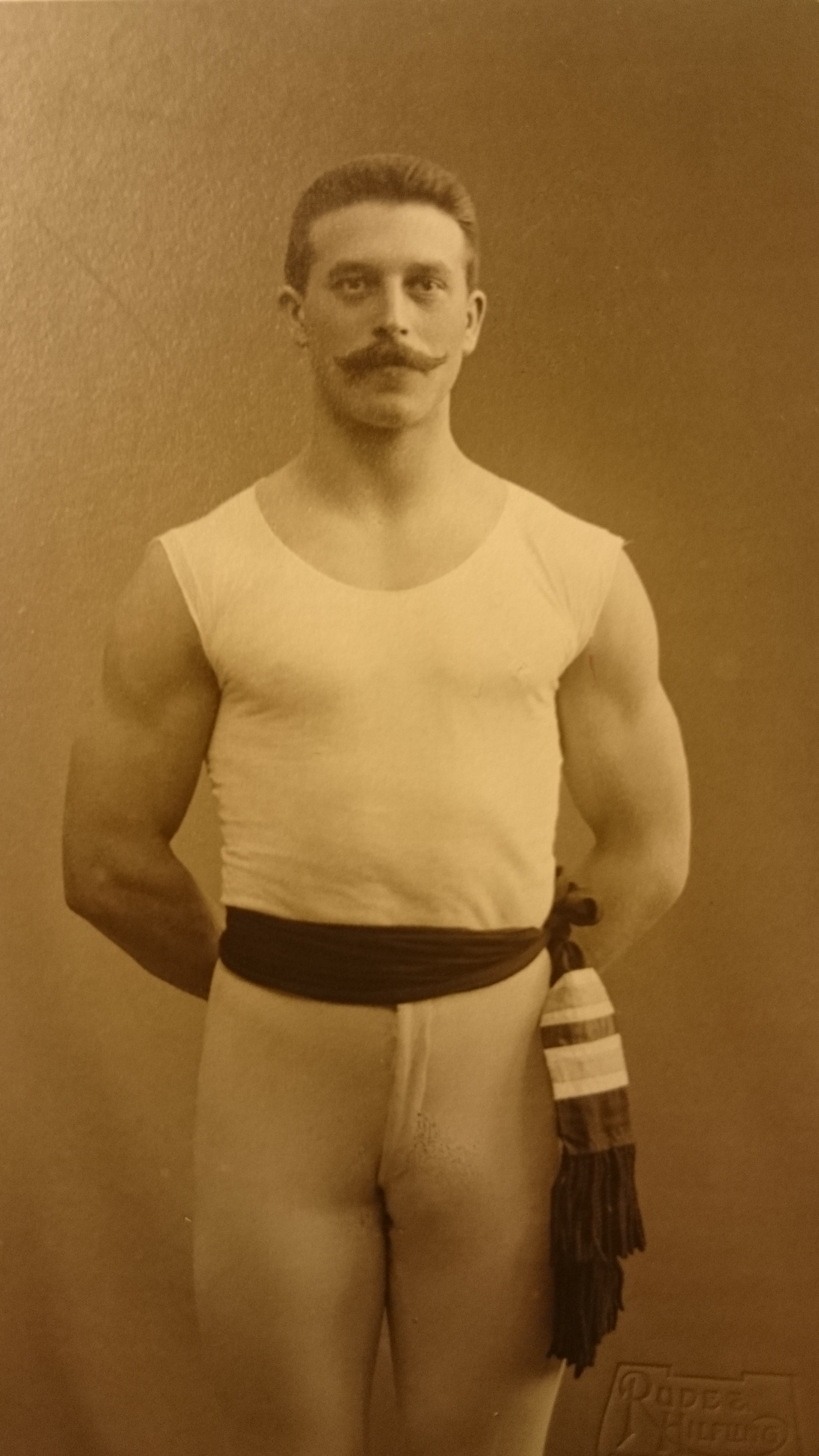

Personal information
- Full name: Christian Olaf Syvertsen
- Born: 23 August 1884 Kristiania, United Kingdoms of Sweden and Norway
- Died: 13 June 1964 (aged 79) Oslo, Norway

Gymnastics career
- Discipline: Men's artistic gymnastics
- Country represented: Norway
- Club: Chistiania Turnforening
Medal record
Men's artistic gymnastics
Representing Norway
Olympic Games
Silver medal – second place	1908 London	Team

Christian Olaf Syvertsen (24 August 1884 – 18 June 1964) was a Norwegian gymnast who competed in the 1908 Summer Olympics. As a member of the Norwegian team, he won the silver medal in the gymnastics team event in 1908.
