= Anders Moen =

Norwegian artistic gymnast

- Born: 1 October 1887 Stange, Sweden-Norway
- Died: 5 July 1966 (aged 78) Skedsmo, Norway

Gymnastics career
- Discipline: Men's artistic gymnastics
- Country represented: Norway
- Gym: Chistiania Turnforening
Medal record
Men's artistic gymnastics
Representing Norway
Olympic Games
Silver medal – second place	1908 London	Team

Anders Moen (1 October 1887 – 5 July 1966) was a Norwegian gymnast who competed in the 1908 Summer Olympics. As a member of the Norwegian team, he won the silver medal in the gymnastics team event in 1908.
