= Oskar Bye =

Norwegian artistic gymnast

- Full name: Oskar Wilhelm Bye
- Born: 3 June 1870
- Died: 30 April 1939 (aged 68)

Gymnastics career
- Discipline: Men's artistic gymnastics
- Country represented: Norway
Medal record
Men's gymnastics
Representing Norway
Olympic Games
| Silver medal – second place | 1908 London | Team |
Intercalated Games
| Gold medal – first place | 1906 Athens | Team |

Oskar Wilhelm Bye (3 June 1870 – 30 April 1939) was a Norwegian gymnast who competed in the 1906 Summer Olympics and in the 1908 Summer Olympics.

At the 1906 Summer Olympics in Athens, he was a member of the Norwegian gymnastics team, which won the gold medal in the team, Swedish system event. Two years later, he was part of the Norwegian team that won the Olympic silver medal in the gymnastics team event.
