= Kurt Stenberg =

Finnish artistic gymnast

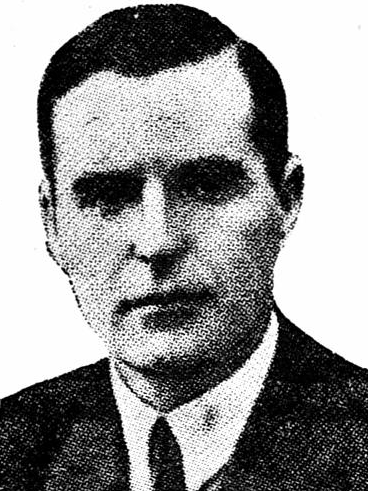

Personal information
- Full name: Kurt Enoch Stenberg
- Born: 11 July 1888 Vaasa, Grand Duchy of Finland, Russian Empire
- Died: 26 March 1936 (aged 47) Karhula, Finland

Gymnastics career
- Discipline: Men's artistic gymnastics
- Country represented: Finland
- Club: Ylioppilasvoimistelijat
Medal record
Men's artistic gymnastics
Representing Finland
Olympic Games
Bronze medal – third place	1908 London	Team

Kurt Enoch Stenberg (11 July 1888 – 26 March 1936) was a Finnish gymnast who won bronze in the 1908 Summer Olympics.

== Early life and education ==
Stenberg was born 11 July 1888 to Lieutenant Anton Ferdinand Stenberg and Gertrud Emilia Kurtén. He performed his matriculation exam at the Vaasa Finnish Lycaeum in 1906. He graduated with a Master of Science (Technology) from the University of Hanover in 1915.

== Gymnastics career ==
Kurt Stenberg at the Olympic Games
Games	Event	Rank	Notes
1908 Summer Olympics	Men's team	3rd	Source:

He was the first Olympic medalist from Vaasa.

He won the Finnish national championship in team gymnastics as a member of Ylioppilasvoimistelijat in 1909.

== Post-gymnastics career ==
Stenberg worked at the Hannoversche Portland-Cementfabrik in Germany during World War I. He returned to Finland in 1918 and worked in the Karhula glass factory until his death, ultimately as its technical director.

He performed an officer examination in 1928, becoming an engineer lieutenant. He also was a local chief of the Kymi White Guard.

== Personal life ==
Stenberg married Lyyli Elise Ylönen in 1919. He died of a cardiac arrest on 26 March 1936.
