= Claës Rundberg =

Swedish sport shooter

- Rundberg in 1908

Personal information
- Born: 14 November 1874 Malmbäck, Sweden
- Died: 27 May 1958 (aged 83) Säby, Sweden

Sport
- Sport: Sports shooting
Medal record
Men's shooting
Representing Sweden
Olympic Games
Silver medal – second place	1908 London	Team free rifle

Claës J. Rundberg (14 November 1874 – 27 May 1958) was a Swedish sport shooter who competed in the 1908 Summer Olympics, where he won the silver medal in the team free rifle event. He was also a member of the Swedish team which finished fifth in the team military rifle event.
