= Harald Smedvik =

Norwegian artistic gymnast

- Full name: Harald Gunvald Smedvik
- Born: 28 March 1888 Glemmen, United Kingdoms of Sweden and Norway
- Died: 5 August 1956 (aged 68) Oslo, Norway

Gymnastics career
- Discipline: Men's artistic gymnastics
- Country represented: Norway
- Club: Chistiania Turnforening
Medal record
Men's artistic gymnastics
Representing Norway
Olympic Games
Silver medal – second place	1908 London	Team

Harald Gunvald Smedvik (28 March 1888 – 5 August 1956) was a Norwegian gymnast who competed in the 1908 Summer Olympics. As a member of the Norwegian team, he won the silver medal in the gymnastics team event in 1908.
