= John Skrataas =

Norwegian artistic gymnast

- Born: 4 May 1890 Egge, United Kingdoms of Sweden and Norway
- Died: 12 February 1961 (aged 70) Trondheim, Norway

Gymnastics career
- Discipline: Men's artistic gymnastics
- Country represented: Norway
- Gym: Stenkjer Turnforening
Medal record
Men's artistic gymnastics
Representing Norway
Olympic Games
Silver medal – second place	1908 London	Team

John Skrataas (4 May 1890 – 12 February 1961) was a Norwegian gymnast who competed in the 1908 Summer Olympics.

As a member of the Norwegian team, he won the silver medal in the gymnastics team event in 1908. He was born in Egge Municipality and died in Steinkjer Municipality and represented the club Steinkjer TF.
