= Thor Larsen =

Norwegian artistic gymnast

- Born: 20 July 1886 Lommedalen, United Kingdoms of Sweden and Norway
- Died: 3 September 1970 (aged 84) Tønsberg, Norway

Gymnastics career
- Discipline: Men's artistic gymnastics
- Country represented: Norway
- Gym: Chistiania Turnforening
Medal record
Men's artistic gymnastics
Representing Norway
Olympic Games
Silver medal – second place	1908 London	Team

Thor Larsen (20 July 1886 – 3 September 1970) was a Norwegian gymnast who competed in the 1908 Summer Olympics.

As a member of the Norwegian team, he won the silver medal in the gymnastics team event in 1908. He was born in Lommedalen but represented the club Kristiania TF. He died in 1970 in Tønsberg and was buried there.
