= Harald Hansen (gymnast) =

Norwegian gymnast (1884–1956)

- Full name: Harald Sigvard Hansen
- Born: 30 October 1884 Halden, United Kingdoms of Sweden and Norway
- Died: 6 March 1956 (aged 71) Halden, Norway

Gymnastics career
- Discipline: Men's artistic gymnastics
- Country represented: Norway
- Gym: Fredrikshalds Turnforening

Harald Sigvard Hansen (30 October 1884 – 6 March 1956) was a Norwegian gymnast. He competed in the men's team event at the 1908 Summer Olympics, winning a silver medal.
