= Einar Sahlstein =

Finnish artistic gymnast

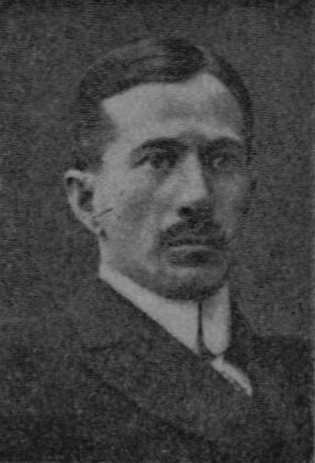
- Sahlstein c. 1921

Personal information
- Full name: Einar Werner Sahlstein
- Born: 30 May 1887 Kuopio, Grand Duchy of Finland, Russian Empire
- Died: 6 March 1936 (aged 48) Helsinki, Finland

Gymnastics career
- Discipline: Men's artistic gymnastics
- Country represented: Finland
- Club: Ylioppilasvoimistelijat
Medal record
Men's artistic gymnastics
Representing Finland
Olympic Games
Bronze medal – third place	1908 London	Team

Einar Werner Sahlstein (30 May 1887 – 6 March 1936) was a Finnish gymnast who won bronze in the 1908 Summer Olympics. He also won two Finnish national championships in track and field athletics.

== Early life and education ==
Sahlstein was born on 30 May 1887 to provincial treasurer Verner Sahlstein and Hulda von Fieandt. He performed his matriculation exam at Kuopio Finnish Coeducational School in 1908 and earned a law degree at the University of Helsinki in 1912.

== Gymnastics career ==
Einar Sahlstein at the Olympic Games
Games	Event	Rank	Notes
1908 Summer Olympics	Men's team	3rd	Source:

He won the Finnish national championship in team gymnastics as a member of Ylioppilasvoimistelijat in 1909.

== Post-gymnastics career ==
At the 1908 Finnish Athletics Championships, Sahlstein won a gold in the two-handed javelin throw event, and another one in the combined jumps event.

Sahlstein worked in banking since 1913. He was in the staff of the Rovaniemi White Guard. He led a platoon in the Rovaniemi skirmish in the opening days of the Finnish Civil War. He received The medal of merit of the Civil Guards.

Sahlstein sat in the municipal council of Rovaniemi kauppala. He was buried at III hautausmaa, Rovaniemi.

Sahlstein was a chairman of the club Warkauden Urheilijat. He was a founding member of the club Ounasvaaran Hiihtoseura and a board member from 1927–1935.

== Personal life ==
Sahlstein married Aino Castren in 1916. They had four children.
