= Ole Iversen =

Norwegian gymnast (1884–1953)

- Born: 21 February 1884 Sarpsborg, United Kingdoms of Sweden and Norway
- Died: 9 March 1953 (aged 69) Sarpsborg, Norway

Gymnastics career
- Discipline: Men's artistic gymnastics
- Country represented: Norway
- Gym: Sarpsborg Turnforening
Medal record
Men's artistic gymnastics
Representing Norway
Olympic Games
| Silver medal – second place | 1908 London | Team |

Ole Iversen (21 February 1884 – 9 March 1953) was a Norwegian gymnast who competed in the 1908 Summer Olympics. As a member of the Norwegian team, he won the silver medal in the gymnastics team event in 1908.
