= Hans Lem =

Norwegian artistic gymnast

- Full name: Hans Schumann Lem
- Born: 19 November 1888 Kristiania, United Kingdoms of Sweden and Norway
- Died: 1 May 1962 (aged 73) Brooklyn, New York, US
- Height: 1.69 m (5 ft 7 in)

Gymnastics career
- Discipline: Men's artistic gymnastics
- Country represented: Norway
- Gym: Chistiania Turnforening
Medal record
Men's artistic gymnastics
Representing Norway
Olympic Games
Silver medal – second place	1908 London	Team

Hans Schumann Lem (19 November 1888 – 1 May 1962) was a Norwegian gymnast who competed in the 1908 Summer Olympics. As a member of the Norwegian team, he won the silver medal in the gymnastics team event in 1908.
