= Hermann Bohne =

Norwegian artistic gymnast

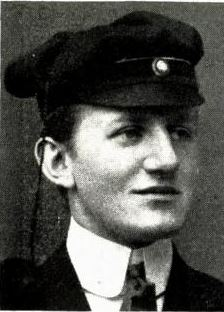

Personal information
- Born: 22 September 1890 Tromsø, United Kingdoms of Sweden and Norway
- Died: 5 January 1949 (aged 58) Tromsø, Norway

Gymnastics career
- Discipline: Men's artistic gymnastics
- Country represented: Norway
- Gym: Chistiania Turnforening
Medal record
Men's artistic gymnastics
Representing Norway
Olympic Games
Silver medal – second place	1908 London	Team

Hermann Bohne (22 September 1890 – 5 January 1949) was a Norwegian gymnast who competed in the 1908 Summer Olympics. As a member of the Norwegian team, he won the silver medal in the gymnastics team event in 1908.
