= Otto Granström =

Finnish gymnast (1887–1941)

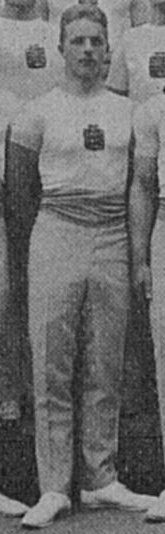
- Granström in 1908

Personal information
- Full name: Otto Emil Granström
- Born: 4 October 1887 Hämeenlinnan maalaiskunta, Grand Duchy of Finland, Russian Empire
- Died: 1 May 1945 (aged 57) Nurmijärvi, Finland

Gymnastics career
- Discipline: Men's artistic gymnastics
- Country represented: Finland
- Club: Ylioppilasvoimistelijat
Medal record
Men's artistic gymnastics
Representing Finland
Olympic Games
Bronze medal – third place	1908 London	Team

Otto Emil Granström (4 October 1887 – 1 May 1945) was a Finnish gymnast who won bronze in the 1908 Summer Olympics.

== Early life and education ==
Granström's father was railwayman Karl Otto Granström (1843–1910) and mother Johanna Elisabeth Olin (1847–1913). He completed his matriculation exam at the Hämeenlinna Lyceum in 1906 and the forester examination in 1910.

== Gymnastics career ==
He won the Finnish national championship in team gymnastics as a member of Ylioppilasvoimistelijat in 1909.

== Personal life ==
He married Agnes Katariina Lönn (1889–) in 1914. He worked in forestry up to his death, ultimately being the chief executive officer of the Hämeenlinna steam sawmill. He served in the White Guard in the Finnish Civil War and received the Memorial Medal of the War of Independence.

== Gymnastics ==
Otto Granström at the Olympic Games
Games	Event	Rank	Notes
1908 Summer Olympics	Men's team	3rd	Source:
