= Nils Widforss =

Swedish artistic gymnast

- Full name: Nils Johan Widforss
- Born: 3 November 1880 Stockholm, United Kingdoms of Sweden and Norway
- Died: 2 May 1960 (aged 79) Bromma, Sweden

Gymnastics career
- Discipline: Men's artistic gymnastics
- Country represented: Sweden
- Club: Stockholms Gymnastikförening
Medal record
Men's artistic gymnastics
Representing Sweden
Olympic Games
Gold medal – first place	1908 London	Team

Nils Johan Widforss (November 30, 1880 – May 2, 1960) was a Swedish gymnast who competed in the 1908 Summer Olympics. He was part of the Swedish team, which was able to win the gold medal in the gymnastics men's team event in 1908.
