= Andreas Cervin =

Swedish artistic gymnast

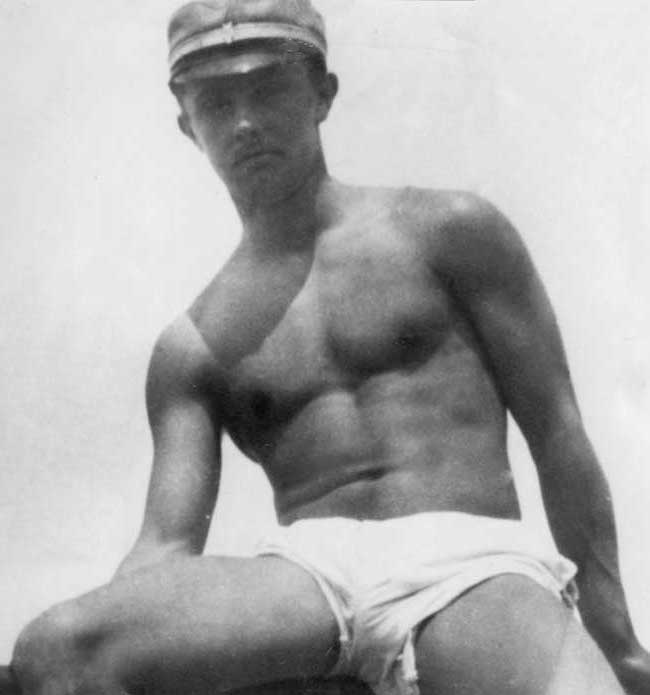
- Born: 31 October 1888 Okome, United Kingdoms of Sweden and Norway
- Died: 14 February 1972 (aged 83) Gothenburg, Sweden

Gymnastics career
- Discipline: Men's artistic gymnastics
- Country represented: Sweden
- Gym: Göteborgs Gymnastikförening
Medal record
Men's artistic gymnastics
Representing Sweden
Olympic Games
Gold medal – first place	1908 London	Team

Andreas Cervin (31 October 1888 – 14 February 1972) was a Swedish gymnast who competed in the 1908 Summer Olympics. He was a member of the Swedish team that won the all-around gold medal.

Born to a priest, Cervin graduated in law from the University of Lund in 1914, and the same year began to work as a clerk in the Göta Court of Appeal. In 1918 he moved to the Municipal Court in Gothenburg, in 1935 became an alderman, and retired in 1955.

Cervin was known for his fearless and straightforward character and for his opposition to the Swedish Coalition Government during World War II. In the 1944 city mayor elections, he collected twice more votes than his strongest opponent, Gösta Bäärnhielm, yet the Government dismissed the results and appointed Bäärnhielm.
