= Gunnar Höjer =

Swedish artistic gymnast

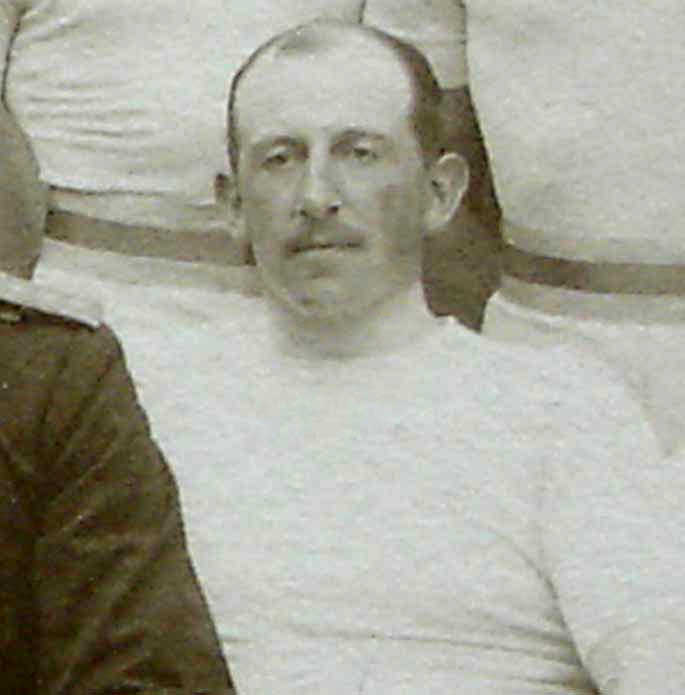
- Höjer c. 1908

Personal information
- Full name: Gunnar Fredrik Höjer
- Born: 27 January 1875 Norrköping, United Kingdoms of Sweden and Norway
- Died: 13 March 1936 (aged 61) Haparanda, Sweden

Gymnastics career
- Discipline: Men's artistic gymnastics
- Country represented: Sweden
- Club: Stockholms Gymnastikförening
Medal record
Men's artistic gymnastics
Representing Sweden
Olympic Games
Gold medal – first place	1908 London	Team

Gunnar Fredrik Höjer (27 January 1875 – 13 March 1936) was a Swedish gymnast who competed in the 1908 Summer Olympics. He was part of the Swedish team that won the all-around gold medal. Aged 33, he was the oldest member of the team.
