= Sven Forssman =

Swedish artistic gymnast

- Full name: Sven Otto Forssman
- Born: 12 September 1882 Gothenburg, United Kingdoms of Sweden and Norway
- Died: 1 March 1919 (aged 36) Gothenburg, Sweden

Gymnastics career
- Discipline: Men's artistic gymnastics
- Country represented: Sweden
- Gym: Göteborgs Gymnastikförening
Medal record
Men's artistic gymnastics
Representing Sweden
Olympic Games
Gold medal – first place	1908 London	Team

Sven Otto Forssman (12 September 1882 – 1 March 1919) was a Swedish gymnast who competed in the 1908 Summer Olympics. He was part of the Swedish team, which was able to win the gold medal in the gymnastics men's team event in 1908.
