= Tor Norberg =

Swedish artistic gymnast

- Full name: Erik Tor Waldemar Norberg
- Born: 17 December 1888 Hålta, United Kingdoms of Sweden and Norway
- Died: 4 August 1972 (aged 83) Clearwater, Florida, US

Gymnastics career
- Discipline: Men's artistic gymnastics
- Country represented: Sweden
Medal record
Men's artistic gymnastics
Representing Sweden
Olympic Games
Gold medal – first place	1908 London	Team

Erik Tor Waldemar Norberg (December 17, 1880 – August 4, 1972) was a Swedish gymnast who competed in the 1908 Summer Olympics. He was part of the Swedish team, which was able to win the gold medal in the gymnastics men's team event in 1908.
