= Johan Jarlén =

Swedish gymnast

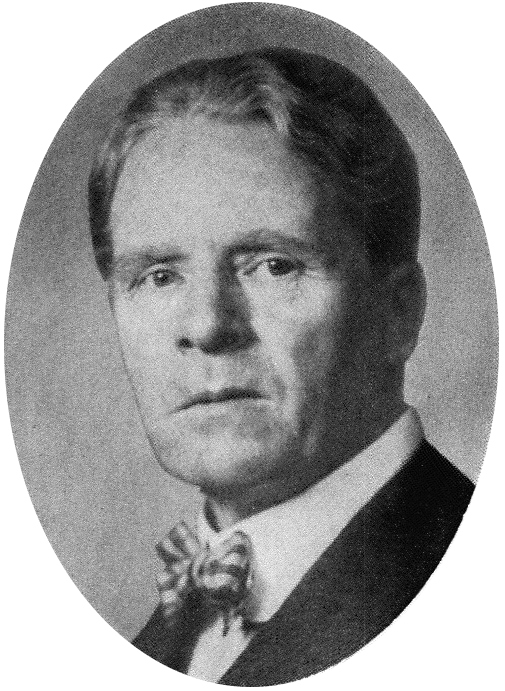
- Portrait of Jarlén

Personal information
- Full name: Johan Jonatan Assaf Jarlén
- Born: 4 November 1880 Gothenburg, United Kingdoms of Sweden and Norway
- Died: 18 April 1955 (aged 74) Gothenburg, Sweden

Gymnastics career
- Discipline: Men's artistic gymnastics
- Country represented: Sweden
- Club: Stockholms Gymnastikförening
Medal record
Men's artistic gymnastics
Representing Sweden
Olympic Games
Gold medal – first place	1908 London	Team

Johan Jonatan Assaf Jarlén (4 November 1880 – 18 April 1955) was a Swedish gymnast who competed in the 1908 Summer Olympics. He was a member of the Swedish team that won the all-around gold medal. He later worked as an architect in Gothenburg.
