= Rolf Johnsson =

Swedish artistic gymnast (1889–1931)

- Full name: Rolf Vilhelm Oscar Johnsson
- Born: 1 December 1889 Stockholm, United Kingdoms of Sweden and Norway
- Died: 3 June 1931 (aged 41) Uppsala, Sweden

Gymnastics career
- Discipline: Men's artistic gymnastics
- Country represented: Sweden
- Club: Stockholms Gymnastikförening
Medal record
Men's artistic gymnastics
Representing Sweden
Olympic Games
Gold medal – first place	1908 London	Team

Rolf Vilhelm Oscar Johnsson (1 December 1889 – 3 June 1931) was a Swedish gymnast who competed in the 1908 Summer Olympics. He was part of the Swedish team, which was able to win the gold medal in the gymnastics men's team event in 1908.
