= Nils von Kantzow =

Swedish gymnast

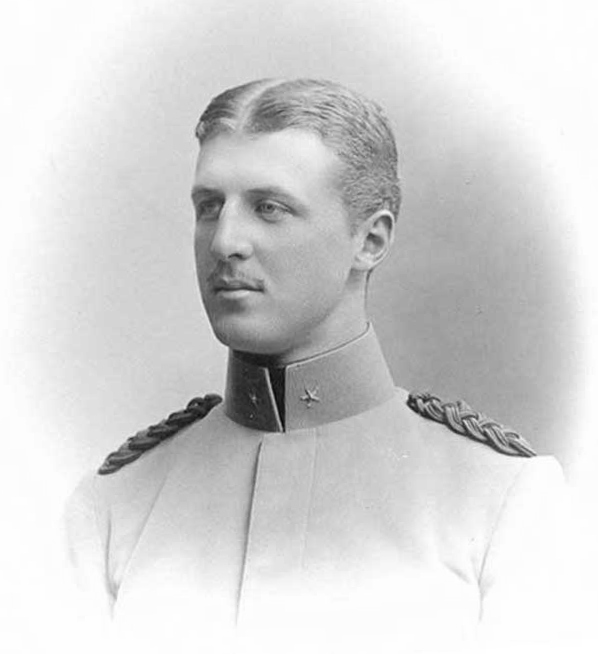
- von Kantzow in military attire

Personal information
- Full name: Nils Gustav von Kantzow
- Born: 30 August 1885 Solna, United Kingdoms of Sweden and Norway
- Died: 7 February 1967 (aged 81) Björkedal, Sweden

Gymnastics career
- Discipline: Men's artistic gymnastics
- Country represented: Sweden
- Club: Stockholms Gymnastikförening
Medal record
Men's artistic gymnastics
Representing Sweden
Olympic Games
| Gold medal – first place | 1908 London | Team |

Nils Gustav von Kantzow (30 August 1885 – 7 February 1967) was a Swedish gymnast who competed in the 1908 Summer Olympics. He was a member of the Swedish team that won the all-around gold medal. He was born in a noble family and reached the rank of captain in the Swedish Army in 1916.

In 1910, von Kantzow married Carin Axelina Hulda Fock, but they were later separated. Their only child, Thomas von Kantzow, was born in 1912. A few days after their divorce in December 1922, Carin married the German airline pilot and hero of World War I Hermann Göring, who later became a senior leader of the Nazi Party.
