= Carl Martin Norberg =

Swedish gymnast (1886–1970)

- Born: 18 July 1889 Avesta, United Kingdoms of Sweden and Norway
- Died: 25 July 1970 (aged 81) Västerås, Sweden

Gymnastics career
- Discipline: Men's artistic gymnastics
- Country represented: Sweden
- Club: Stockholms Gymnastikförening
Medal record
Men's artistic gymnastics
Representing Sweden
Olympic Games
Gold medal – first place	1908 London	Team

Carl Martin Norberg (18 July 1889 - 25 July 1970) was a Swedish gymnast who competed in the 1908 Summer Olympics. He was part of the Swedish team, which was able to win the gold medal in the gymnastics men's team event in 1908.
