= Leonard Peterson (gymnast) =

Swedish artistic gymnast

- Full name: Carl Johan Leonard Peterson
- Born: 30 October 1885 Stockholm, United Kingdoms of Sweden and Norway
- Died: 15 April 1956 (aged 70) Stockholm, Sweden

Gymnastics career
- Discipline: Men's artistic gymnastics
- Country represented: Sweden
- Club: Stockholms Gymnastikförening
Medal record
Men's artistic gymnastics
Representing Sweden
Olympic Games
| Gold medal – first place | 1908 London | Team |

Carl Johan Leonard Peterson (30 October 1885 – 15 April 1956) was a Swedish gymnast who competed in the 1908 Summer Olympics. He was part of the Swedish team, which was able to win the gold medal in the gymnastics men's team event in 1908.
