= Haakon Sörvik =

Swedish gymnast

- Full name: Haakon Abraham Sörvik
- Born: 31 October 1886 Gothenburg, United Kingdoms of Sweden and Norway
- Died: 30 May 1970 (aged 83) Gothenburg, Sweden
- Relatives: Birger Sörvik (brother); Leif Sörvik (brother)

Gymnastics career
- Discipline: Men's artistic gymnastics
- Country represented: Sweden
- Gym: Göteborgs Gymnastikförening
Medal record
Men's artistic gymnastics
Representing Sweden
Olympic Games
Gold medal – first place	1908 London	Team

Haakon Abraham Sörvik (October 31, 1886 – May 30, 1970) was a Swedish gymnast who competed in the 1908 Summer Olympics. He was part of the Swedish team, which was able to win the gold medal in the gymnastics men's team event in 1908.
