= Erik Norberg =

Swedish artistic gymnast

- Born: 30 September 1883 Smedjebacken, United Kingdoms of Sweden and Norway
- Died: 19 February 1954 (aged 70) London, England

Gymnastics career
- Discipline: Men's artistic gymnastics
- Country represented: Sweden
- Club: Stockholms Gymnastikförening
Medal record
Men's artistic gymnastics
Representing Sweden
Olympic Games
Gold medal – first place	1908 London	Team

Erik Norberg (30 September 1883 – 19 February 1954) was a Swedish gymnast who competed in the 1908 Summer Olympics. He was part of the Swedish team, which was able to win the gold medal in the gymnastics men's team event in 1908.
