= Olle Lanner =

Swedish artistic gymnast

- Full name: Olof Gustaf Reinhold Lanner
- Born: 30 December 1884 Stora Tuna, United Kingdoms of Sweden and Norway
- Died: 26 July 1926 (aged 41) Stockholm, Sweden

Gymnastics career
- Discipline: Men's artistic gymnastics
- Country represented: Sweden
- Club: Stockholms Gymnastikförening
Medal record
Men's artistic gymnastics
Representing Sweden
Olympic Games
Gold medal – first place	1908 London	Team

Olof Gustaf Reinhold "Olle" Lanner (December 30, 1884 – July 26, 1926) was a Swedish gymnast who competed in the 1908 Summer Olympics. He was a member of the Swedish team which was able to win the gold medal in the gymnastics men's team event in 1908.
