= Carl Folcker =

Swedish gymnast (1889–1911)

- Full name: Carl Wilhelm Folcker
- Born: 28 March 1889 Filipstad, United Kingdoms of Sweden and Norway
- Died: 3 July 1911 (aged 22) Karlstad Municipality, Sweden

Gymnastics career
- Discipline: Men's artistic gymnastics
- Country represented: Sweden
- Club: Stockholms Gymnastikförening
Medal record
Men's artistic gymnastics
Representing Sweden
Olympic Games
Gold medal – first place	1908 London	Team

Carl Wilhelm Folcker (March 28, 1889 – July 3, 1911) was a Swedish gymnast who competed in the 1908 Summer Olympics. He was part of the Swedish team, which was able to win the gold medal in the gymnastics men's team event in 1908. He died by suicide on 3 July 1911 at Trossnäs field.
