= Osvald Moberg =

Swedish artistic gymnast

- Full name: Karl Osvald Moberg
- Born: 14 September 1888 Stockholm, United Kingdoms of Sweden and Norway
- Died: 22 December 1933 (aged 45) Stockholm, Sweden

Gymnastics career
- Discipline: Men's artistic gymnastics
- Country represented: Sweden
- Club: Stockholms Gymnastikförening
Medal record
Men's artistic gymnastics
Representing Sweden
Olympic Games
Gold medal – first place	1908 London	Team

Karl Osvald Moberg (September 14, 1888 – December 22, 1933) was a Swedish gymnast who competed in the 1908 Summer Olympics. He was part of the Swedish team, which was able to win the gold medal in the gymnastics men's team event in 1908.
