= Hugo Jahnke =

Swedish gymnast (1886–1939)

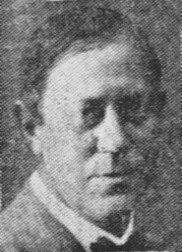
- Jahnke c. 1939

Personal information
- Full name: Curt Hugo Jahnke
- Born: 6 March 1886 Stockholm, United Kingdoms of Sweden and Norway
- Died: 12 January 1939 (aged 52) Stockholm, Sweden

Gymnastics career
- Discipline: Men's artistic gymnastics
- Country represented: Sweden
- Club: Stockholms Gymnastikförening
Medal record
Men's artistic gymnastics
Representing Sweden
Olympic Games
Gold medal – first place	1908 London	Team

Curt Hugo Jahnke (March 6, 1886 in Stockholm – January 12, 1939) was a Swedish gymnast who competed in the 1908 Summer Olympics. He was part of the Swedish team, which was able to win the gold medal in the gymnastics men's team event in 1908.
