= Axel Sjöblom =

Swedish artistic gymnast

- Full name: Axel Adolf Sjöblom
- Born: 17 December 1882 Stockholm, United Kingdoms of Sweden and Norway
- Died: 10 October 1951 (aged 68) Stockholm, Sweden

Gymnastics career
- Discipline: Men's artistic gymnastics
- Country represented: Sweden
- Club: Stockholms Gymnastikförening
Medal record
Men's artistic gymnastics
Representing Sweden
Olympic Games
Gold medal – first place	1908 London	Team

Axel Adolf Sjöblom (December 17, 1882 – October 10, 1951) was a Swedish gymnast who competed in the 1908 Summer Olympics. He was part of the Swedish team, which was able to win the gold medal in the gymnastics men's team event in 1908.
