= Hjalmar Cedercrona =

Swedish artistic gymnast

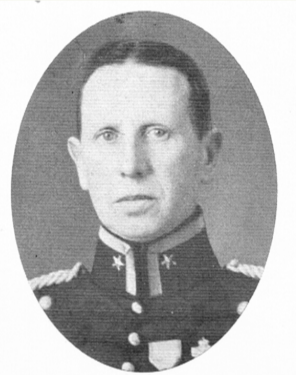
- Cedercrona in military attire

Personal information
- Full name: Hjalmar Axel Fritz Cedercrona
- Born: 23 December 1883 Horn, United Kingdoms of Sweden and Norway
- Died: 24 May 1969 (aged 85) Jönköping, Sweden

Gymnastics career
- Discipline: Men's artistic gymnastics
- Country represented: Sweden
- Club: Artilleri 6 Idrottsförening
Medal record
Men's artistic gymnastics
Representing Sweden
Olympic Games
Gold medal – first place	1908 London	Team

Hjalmar Axel Fritz Cedercrona (23 December 1883 – 24 May 1969) was a Swedish gymnast who competed in the 1908 Summer Olympics. He was part of the Swedish team, which was able to win the gold medal in the gymnastics men's team event in 1908.
