= Gustaf Rosenquist =

Swedish artistic gymnast

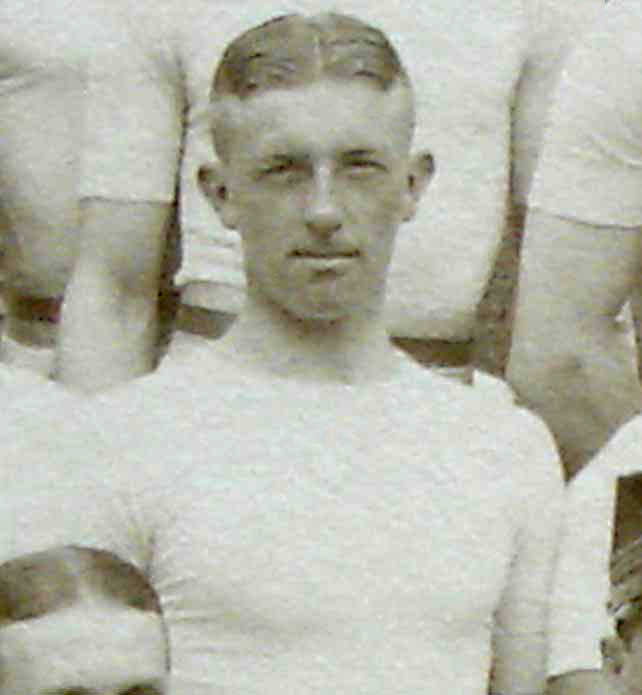
- Rosenquist c. 1908

Personal information
- Full name: Gustaf Vilhelm Rosenquist
- Born: 10 September 1887 Jönköping, United Kingdoms of Sweden and Norway
- Died: 22 December 1961 (aged 74) Las Palmas, Spain

Gymnastics career
- Discipline: Men's artistic gymnastics
- Country represented: Sweden
- Gym: Jönköpings Gymnastikförening
Medal record
Men's artistic gymnastics
Representing Sweden
Olympic Games
Gold medal – first place	1908 London	Team

Gustaf Vilhelm Rosenquist (10 September 1887 – 22 December 1961) was a Swedish gymnast who competed in the 1908 Summer Olympics. He was part of the Swedish team that won the all-around gold medal.
