= Rudolf Degermark =

Swedish artistic gymnast

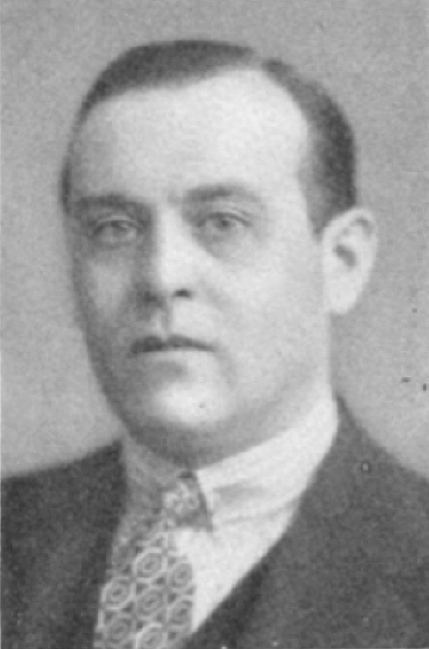
- Full name: Rudolf Reinhold Degermark
- Born: 19 July 1886 Piteå, United Kingdoms of Sweden and Norway
- Died: 21 May 1960 (aged 73) Bromma, Sweden

Gymnastics career
- Discipline: Men's artistic gymnastics
- Country represented: Sweden
- Club: Stockholms Gymnastikförening
Medal record
Men's artistic gymnastics
Representing Sweden
Olympic Games
Gold medal – first place	1908 London	Team

Rudolf Reinhold Degermark (July 19, 1886 – May 21, 1960) was a Swedish gymnast who competed in the 1908 Summer Olympics. He was part of the Swedish team, which was able to win the gold medal in the gymnastics men's team event in 1908.
