= Karl-Gustaf Vingqvist =

Swedish artistic gymnast

- Born: 15 October 1883 Tived, United Kingdoms of Sweden and Norway
- Died: 19 November 1967 (aged 84) Lund, Sweden

Gymnastics career
- Discipline: Men's artistic gymnastics
- Country represented: Sweden
- Club: Stockholms Gymnastikförening
Medal record
Men's artistic gymnastics
Representing Sweden
Olympic Games
Gold medal – first place	1908 London	Team

Karl-Gustaf Vingqvist (15 October 1883 – 19 November 1967) was a Swedish gymnast who competed in the 1908 Summer Olympics. He was part of the Swedish team, which was able to win the gold medal in the gymnastics men's team event in 1908.
