= Finland at the 1908 Summer Olympics =

- The Grand Duchy of Finland had no official flag; the Russian flag was used for both countries in the Olympics
- IOC code: FIN
- NOC: Finnish Olympic Committee

in London
- Competitors: 62 (62 men and 0 women) in 6 sports and 23 events
- Flag bearer: Bruno Zilliacus
- Medals Ranked 13th: Gold 1 Silver 1 Bronze 3 Total 5

Summer Olympics appearances (overview)
- 1908; 1912; 1920; 1924; 1928; 1932; 1936; 1948; 1952; 1956; 1960; 1964; 1968; 1972; 1976; 1980; 1984; 1988; 1992; 1996; 2000; 2004; 2008; 2012; 2016; 2020; 2024

Other related appearances
- 1906 Intercalated Games

Finland competed at the Summer Olympic Games for the first time at the 1908 Summer Olympics in London, United Kingdom. The Grand Duchy of Finland was an autonomous part of the Russian Empire at the time, which allowed it to send a separate team to the Games.

== Medals ==
Verner Weckman became the first Finn to win an Olympic gold. He had also been the first Finn to win a gold at the 1906 Intercalated Games.

Medal	Name	Sport	Event
Gold	Verner Weckman	Wrestling	Men's Greco-Roman light heavyweight
Silver	Yrjö Saarela	Wrestling	Men's Greco-Roman light heavyweight
Bronze	Eino Forsström; Otto Granström; Johan Kemp; Iivari Kyykoski; Heikki Lehmusto; John Lindroth; Yrjö Linko; Edvard Linna; Matti Markkanen; Kalle Mikkolainen; Veli Nieminen; Kalle Kustaa Paasia; Arvi Pohjanpää; Aarne Pohjonen; Eino Railio; Ale Riipinen; Arno Saarinen; Einar Sahlstein; Aarne Salovaara; Torsten Sandelin; Elis Sipilä; Viktor Smeds; Kaarlo Soinio; Kurt Stenberg; Väinö Tiiri; Magnus Wegelius	Gymnastics	Men's team
Bronze	Verner Järvinen	Athletics	Men's Greek discus throw
Bronze	Arvo Linden	Wrestling	Men's Greco-Roman lightweight

== Team ==
Competitors from Finland per sport
Sport	Men
Athletics	15
Diving	2
Gymnastics	31
Shooting	9
Swimming	3
Wrestling	4
Total	62

Aarne Salovaara and Johan Kemp competed in two sports, among 46 athletes in the games who competed in multiple sports.

No women competed from Finland. However, Valborg Florström performed in a diving exhibition, which made her the first Finnish woman in the Olympics.

Including non-competitors, the Finnish team had 73 athletes and 6 officials. Chef de Mission was Reinhold Felix von Willebrand. The Finnish Comité D'Honneur was Axel Fredrik Londen, Gösta Wasenius and Fred Hackman.

== Preparations ==
At the time, Grand Duchy of Finland was not an independent country, but an autonomous part of the Russian Empire. However, Finns were qualified to take part independently as a sporting nation, which was a category recently devised by Pierre de Coubertin, in an International Olympic Committee meeting in May 1907. Formal Finnish preparations for the 1908 Games had already began by then. In December, the Finnish Olympic Committee was established, which budgeted 48,000 Finnish markkas (equal to about 200,000 euros in 2018) for a team of 80 to be sent. Half of it was applied from the Senate of Finland, who eventually granted only 8,000 markkas (€30,000). By June 1908, a further 22,000 markkas (€90,000) had been raised by various means.

The Finnish Olympic team was mostly selected by trials arranged in the spring of 1908. A few had to be replaced, when gymnastics teachers were defined as professionals.

Most of the Finnish team departed Helsinki aboard steamer Polaris on 7 July 1908. The shooting team had departed on 1 July, and wrestler Verner Weckman travelled independently from Berlin.

== Opening ceremony controversies ==
Polaris arrived in Hull on 13 July, the day of the opening ceremony, late due to a machine breakdown. A train took them to London, where they went directly from the station to the stadium. The hosts penalized the Finnish tardiness by having them enter the stadium last in the Parade of Nations, instead of their alphabetical position.

A further problem was caused by their flag. There was no official flag of Finland at the time, but they had brought three options, one of which represented the coat of arms of Finland, the other two bearing the texts "Finlandia" and "Suomi-Finland". However, none of them was allowed, and the flag bearer Bruno Zilliacus carried a mere cardboard text plaque "Finland" that was borrowed from their dressing room door.

== Contemporary assessment ==
The popular opinion in Finland of the overall athletic success of their Olympic team was meager, considering its numbers.

Finnish sports leaders judged the Olympic participation to have been merely an expensive excursion, and pointed out two principal problems. First was an undisciplined and immoral tourist mindset among the team, which manifested as partying, smoking cigarettes and drinking alcohol. Second was a poor organization for the Games, which included a belated preparation only months in advance; minimal equipment for the team, such as bringing only one javelin; and having no professional coaching.

== Athletics ==
Finland's best result was Verner Järvinen's bronze medal in the Greek-style discus throw. The athletics team generally performed up to expectations. Only javelin throw was considered a let down.

Unless otherwise specified, results are lifted from:

- Mallon, Bill; Buchanan, Ian (2001). The 1908 Olympic Games: Results for All Competitors in All Events, With Commentary. Jefferson, North Carolina, United States: McFarland. pp. 44–100. ISBN 978-0-7864-0598-5.

=== Track and road events ===
Athlete	Event	Heat		Semifinal		Final	
Athlete	Event	Time	Rank	Time	Rank	Time	Rank
Kalle Nieminen	Men's marathon	—N/a				3:09:50.8	10
Lauri Pihkala	Men's 400 metres	did not start		did not advance			
Uuno Railo (Note: Could not compete due to a muscle strain.)	Men's 100 metres	did not start		did not advance			
Uuno Railo	Men's 200 metres	did not start		did not advance			
Uuno Railo	Men's 400 metres	did not start		did not advance			
Ragnar Stenberg	Men's 100 metres	unknown	5th in heat	did not advance			
Ragnar Stenberg	Men's 200 metres	unknown	3rd in heat (Note: Official records say he finished his heat, but Finnish sources say he did not finish due to muscle strain)	did not advance			
Ragnar Stenberg	Men's 400 metres	did not start		did not advance			
Ragnar Stenberg	Men's 800 metres	did not start		—N/a		did not advance	
Ragnar Stenberg	Men's 110 metres hurdles	did not start		did not advance			
Ragnar Stenberg	Men's 400 metres hurdles	did not start		did not advance			
Fredrik Svanström	Men's 800 metres	did not finish (Note: Official records say he did not finish, but Finnish records say he placed 5th in heat, with time 2:04.6)		—N/a		did not advance	
Fredrik Svanström	Men's 1500 metres	4:25.2	3rd in heat	—N/a		did not advance	
unknown	Men's medley relay	did not start		—N/a		did not advance	

=== Field events ===
Athlete	Event	Qualification		Final	
Athlete	Event	Result	Rank	Result	Rank
Juho Halme	Men's triple jump	unknown	18–20 (Note: From The Sportsman and The People. Many sources do not list him competing in this event.)	did not advance	
Juho Halme	Men's shot put	unknown	9–25	did not advance	
Juho Halme	Men's javelin throw	44.96 (Note: From New York Herald. His mark was not officially recorded.)	6	did not advance	
Juho Halme	Men's freestyle javelin throw	39.88	9	did not advance	
Juho Halme	Men's discus throw	did not start		did not advance	
Evert Jakobsson	Men's javelin throw	unknown	8–16	did not advance	
Evert Jakobsson	Men's freestyle javelin throw	unknown	10–33	did not advance	
Evert Jakobsson	Men's shot put	did not start		did not advance	
Jarl Jakobsson	Men's standing long jump	unknown (Note: Two Finnish newspaper correspondents reported his result as 310, which would place him 8th.)	8–25	did not advance	
Jarl Jakobsson	Men's javelin throw	unknown	8–16	did not advance	
Jarl Jakobsson	Men's freestyle javelin throw	unknown	10–33	did not advance	
Jarl Jakobsson	Shot put	did not start		did not advance	
Verner Järvinen	Men's shot put	unknown	9–25	did not advance	
Verner Järvinen	Men's discus throw	39.43	4	did not advance	
Verner Järvinen	Men's Greek discus throw	36.49	3	36.49	3rd place, bronze medalist(s)
Verner Järvinen	Men's freestyle javelin throw	unknown	10–33	did not advance	
Johan Kemp	Men's freestyle javelin throw	unknown	10–33	did not advance	
Elmer Niklander	Men's shot put	unknown (Note: Result was circa 11 metres.)	9–25	did not advance	
Elmer Niklander	Men's discus throw	unknown (Note: Result was circa 36 metres.)	12–42	did not advance	
Elmer Niklander	Men's Greek discus throw	32.46	9	did not advance	
Armas Pesonen	Men's javelin throw	45.17	5	did not advance	
Armas Pesonen	Men's freestyle javelin throw	46.04	6	did not advance	
Armas Pesonen	Long jump	did not start		did not advance	
Lauri Pihkala	Men's high jump	5 feet 6 inches (168 cm)	16	did not advance	
Lauri Pihkala	Men's discus throw	unknown	12–42	did not advance	
Lauri Pihkala	Men's shot put	did not start		did not advance	
Uuno Railo (Note: Could not compete due to a muscle strain.)	Men's triple jump	did not start		did not advance	
Aarne Salovaara	Men's discus throw	unknown	12–42	did not advance	
Aarne Salovaara	Men's javelin throw	45.89	4	did not advance	
Aarne Salovaara	Men's freestyle javelin throw	unknown	10–33	did not advance	
Jalmari Sauli	Men's shot put	12.58	7	did not advance	
Jalmari Sauli	Men's discus throw	unknown	12–42	did not advance	
Jalmari Sauli	Men's javelin throw	unknown	7	did not advance	
Jalmari Sauli	Men's freestyle javelin throw	43.30	8	did not advance	
Jalmari Sauli	Men's Greek discus throw	did not start		did not advance	
Lauri Wilskman	Men's high jump	did not start (Note: His qualification result was 5 feet 6 inches (168 cm). However, due to changing conditions, his qualification pool was declared void and to be re-jumped. He did not start the re-jump.)		did not advance	
Lauri Wilskman	Men's discus throw	unknown	12–42	did not advance	
Lauri Wilskman	Shot put	did not start		did not advance	
Lauri Wilskman	Greek discus throw	did not start		did not advance	
Bruno Zilliacus	Men's shot put	unknown	9–25	did not advance	

== Diving ==
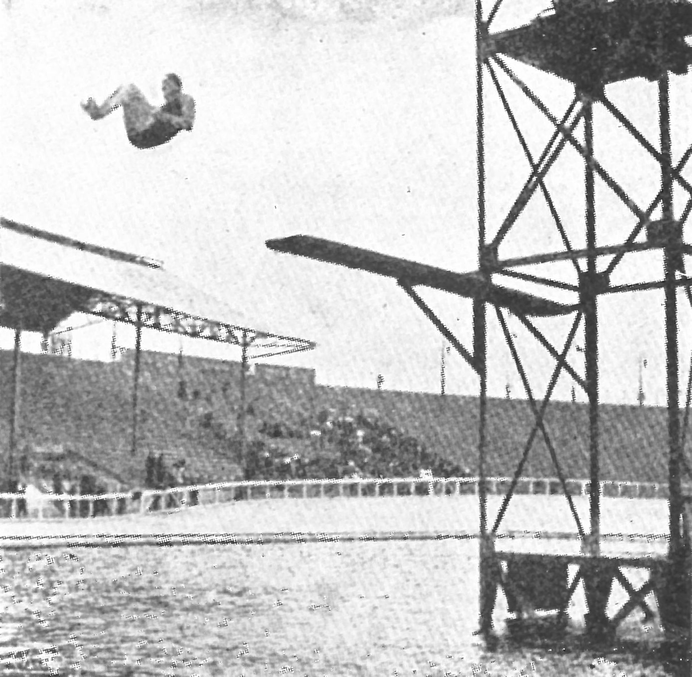
Oskar Wetzell in the diving competition

The Finnish divers had low expectations, as they had previously competed in plain jumps only, and their scores suffered from low degrees of difficulty. Valborg Florström performed a diving exhibition with Ebba Gisico of Sweden, which was the first appearance of women in the Olympic pool.

Results are lifted from:

- Mallon, Bill; Buchanan, Ian (2001). The 1908 Olympic Games: Results for All Competitors in All Events, With Commentary. Jefferson, North Carolina, United States: McFarland. pp. 141–146. ISBN 978-0-7864-0598-5.

Athlete	Event	Round One		Semi-finals		Final	
Athlete	Event	Points	Rank	Points	Rank	Points	Rank
Toivo Aro	Men's 10 metre platform	69.50	2nd in pool	62.70	3rd in pool	did not advance	
Waldemar Ullström	Men's 10 metre platform	did not start		did not advance			
Oskar Wetzell	Men's 3 metre springboard	70.83	2nd in pool	70.10	6th in pool	did not advance	
Oskar Wetzell	Men's 10 metre platform	69.70	4th in pool	did not advance			

== Gymnastics ==
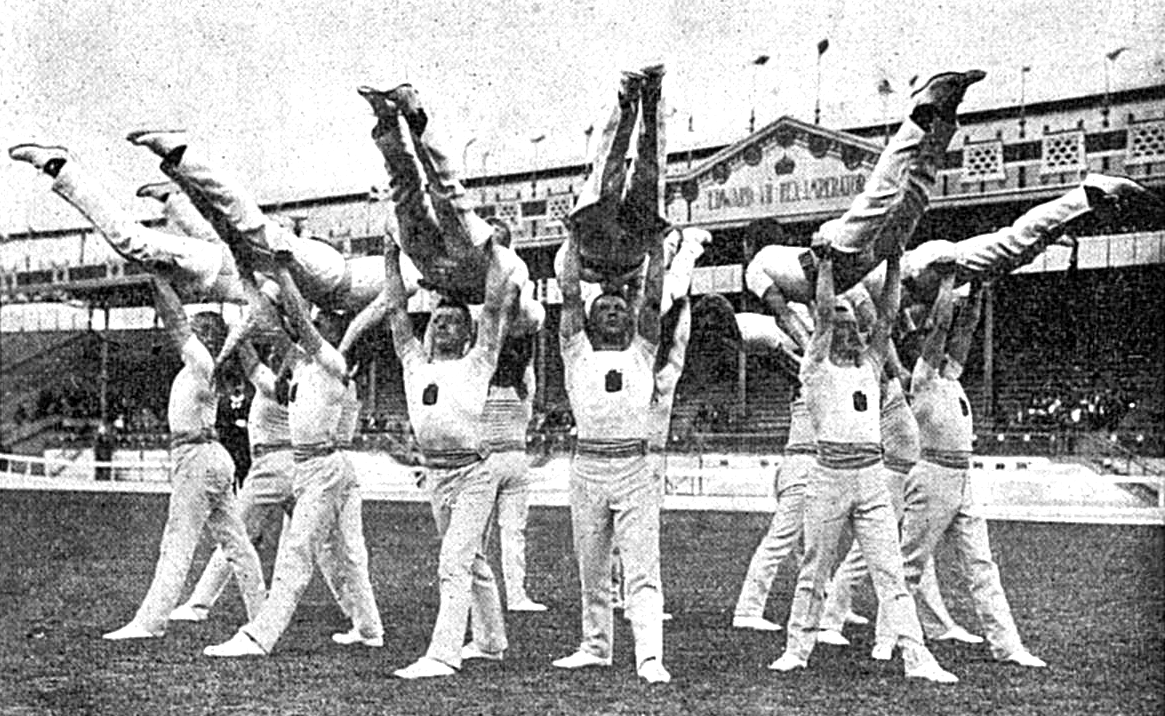
Finland at the team event

Three groups of gymnasts travelled to the Games from Finland. The 26-man main group took part in the team event and 5 men in the individual artistic event. Viipurin Reipas also sent an exhibition team. The Finnish overall result was considered satisfactory.

Gymnast	Event	Points	Rank
Riku Korhonen	Men's artistic individual all-around	143.50	75
Eetu Kosonen	Men's artistic individual all-around	120.00	88
Iivari Partanen	Men's artistic individual all-around	121.00	85
Jaska Saarivuori	Men's artistic individual all-around	132.00	81
David Teivonen	Men's artistic individual all-around	117.50	91
Eino Forsström; Otto Granström; Johan Kemp; Iivari Kyykoski; Heikki Lehmusto; John Lindroth; Yrjö Linko; Edvard Linna; Matti Markkanen; Kalle Mikkolainen; Veli Nieminen; Kalle Kustaa Paasia; Arvi Pohjanpää; Aarne Pohjonen; Eino Railio; Ale Riipinen; Arno Saarinen; Einar Sahlstein; Aarne Salovaara; Torsten Sandelin; Elis Sipilä; Viktor Smeds; Kaarlo Soinio; Kurt Stenberg; Väinö Tiiri; Magnus Wegelius	Men's team	405	(bronze)

== Shooting ==
=== Rifle ===
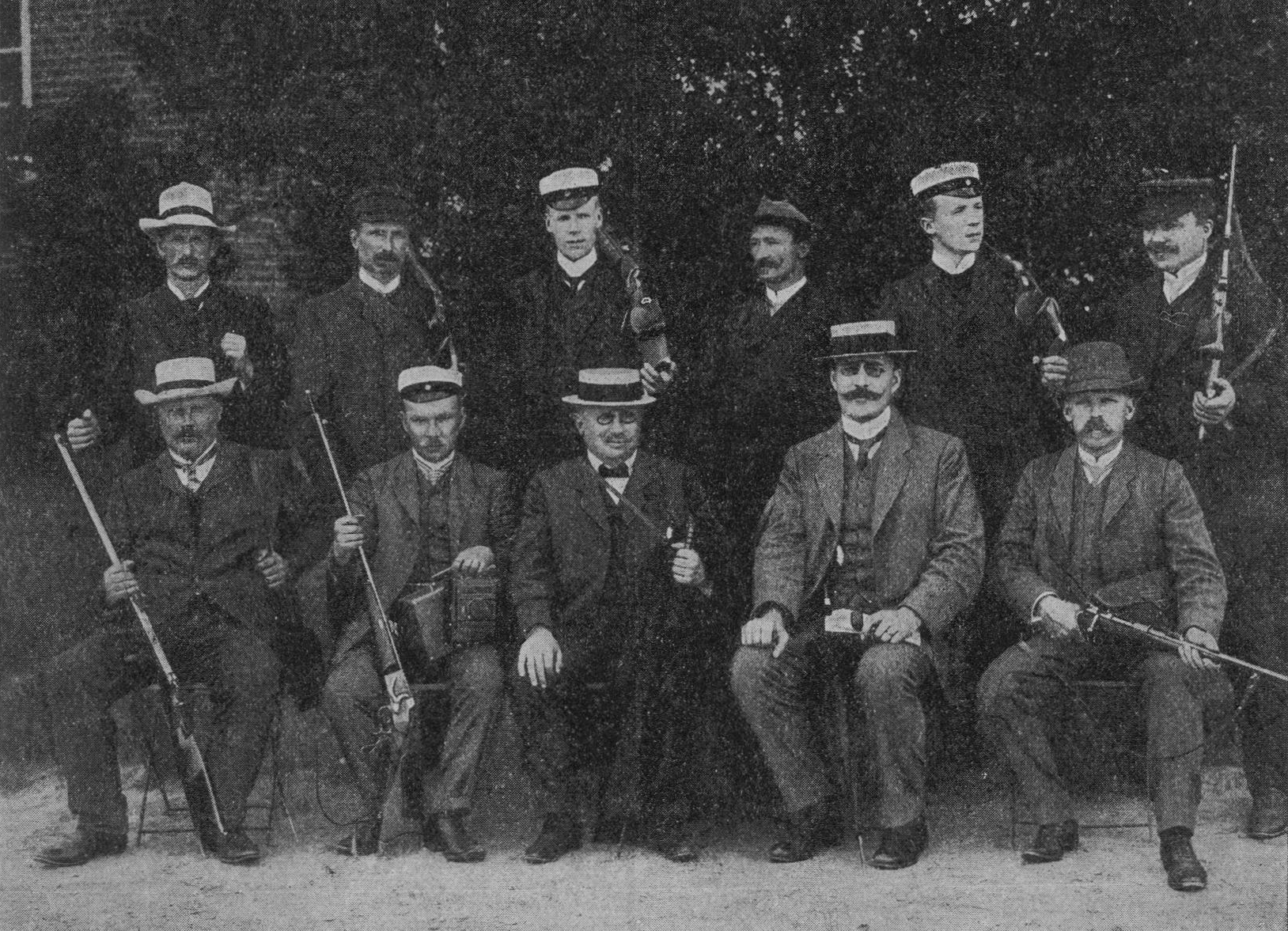
Finland's Olympic rifle shooters

The Finnish shooting team performed poorly against expectations and returned in disgrace. The captain of the shooting team, Axel Fredrik Londen, explained in an article that the Finnish shooters could only afford an inferior number of practice shots and inferior gunpowder. There also was an import ban on modern bullets and rifles in Finland. Lauri Kolho blamed the fiasco on antiquated gunpowder and bullets further impaired by a strong crosswind.

Results are lifted from:

- Mallon, Bill; Buchanan, Ian (2001). The 1908 Olympic Games: Results for All Competitors in All Events, With Commentary. Jefferson, North Carolina, United States: McFarland. pp. 223–227. ISBN 978-0-7864-0598-5.

Shooter	Event	Score	Rank
Heikki Hallamaa	Men's 300 metre free rifle, three positions	576	46
Heikki Huttunen	Men's 300 metre free rifle, three positions	686	38
Lauri Kolho	Men's 300 metre free rifle, three positions	672	39
Voitto Kolho	Men's 300 metre free rifle, three positions	788	17
Gustaf Nyman	Men's 300 metre free rifle, three positions	615	44
Frans Nässling	Men's 300 metre free rifle, three positions	733	30
Emil Nässling	Men's 300 metre free rifle, three positions	657	41
Karl Reilin	Men's 300 metre free rifle, three positions	584	45
Huvi Tuiskunen	Men's 300 metre free rifle, three positions	697	37
Heikki Huttunen; Voitto Kolho; Gustaf Nyman; Emil Nässling; Frans Nässling; Huvi Tuiskunen	Men's 300 metre free rifle, team	3,962	8

=== Trap ===
Shooter	Event	1st stage	2nd stage	3rd stage	Total	Rank
Karl Fazer	Men's trap	did not start				
Robert Huber	Men's trap	did not start				
Axel Fredrik Londen	Men's trap	Eliminated	did not advance		unknown	29–61

Sources differ on the Finnish participation in the trap event:

- In the Official Report of the 1908 Olympics (published in 1909), the three Finns are listed among 61 entrants to the trap event. It then details the results for 28 shooters that reached the second stage, implying the Finns were eliminated in the first stage.
- Bill Mallon and Ian Buchanan in modern research of the 1908 Olympics (2000) argue that out of the 61 entrants, only about 31 started, all of whom were allowed to advance to the second stage, and the Finns never started the event.
- In a contemporary article (1908), Londen describes himself being at the Games in team leader's form, the Finnish shooters entering rifle events only and never mentions Huber or Fazer.
- The centennial history of the Finnish Olympic Committee (2007) lists Londen as a competitor who was eliminated in the first round without Fazer and Huber.
- The centennial history of the Finnish Shooting Sport Federation (2019) considers Fazer and Huber to not have started the event and Londen eliminated in the first round.

== Swimming ==
The Finnish swimmers had low expectations and took the games as an excursion. They skipped the freestyle events and competed for the first time in backstroke. Also, they were used to a 25-metre track, but the Olympic pool was 100 metres long, which hindered them in their main event, the breaststroke.

Unless otherwise specified, results are lifted from:

- Mallon, Bill; Buchanan, Ian (2001). The 1908 Olympic Games: Results for All Competitors in All Events, With Commentary. Jefferson, North Carolina, United States: McFarland. pp. 242–253. ISBN 978-0-7864-0598-5.

Athlete	Event	Heat		Semifinal		Final	
Athlete	Event	Time	Rank	Time	Rank	Time	Rank
Herman Cederberg	Men's 100 metre backstroke	did not start		did not advance			
Herman Cederberg	Men's 200 metre breaststroke	unknown	4th–5th in heat	did not advance			
Herman Cederberg	Men's 1500 metre freestyle	did not start		did not advance			
John Henriksson	Men's 100 metre backstroke	unknown	3rd in heat	did not advance			
John Henriksson	Men's 200 metre breaststroke	unknown	3rd in heat	did not advance			
Hugo Jonsson	Men's 100 metre backstroke	unknown	3rd in heat	did not advance			
Hugo Jonsson	Men's 200 metre breaststroke	did not finish		did not advance			

== Wrestling ==
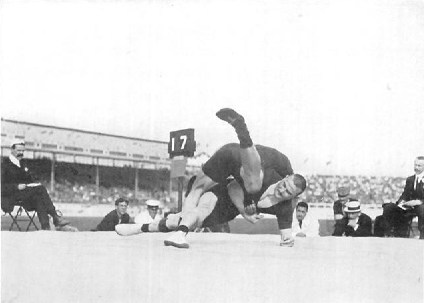
Weckman and Saarela in the finals

Results are lifted from:

- Mallon, Bill; Buchanan, Ian (2001). The 1908 Olympic Games: Results for All Competitors in All Events, With Commentary. Jefferson, North Carolina, United States: McFarland. pp. 284–290. ISBN 978-0-7864-0598-5.

Athlete	Event	Round of 32	Round of 16	Quarterfinal	Semifinal	Final / Bronze	Rank
Athlete	Event	Opposition Result	Opposition Result	Opposition Result	Opposition Result	Opposition Result (best out of three)	Rank
Jussi Kivimäki	Men's Greco-Roman light heavyweight	Bye	Jacob van Westrop (NED); L/p	did not advance			9
Arvo Lindén	Men's Greco-Roman lightweight	Lucien Hansen (BEL); W/f	Carl Carlsen (DEN); W/f	Anders Møller (DEN); W/f	Nikolay Orlov (RU1); L/p	Gunnar Persson (SWE); 2–0 W (W/f, W/f)	3rd place, bronze medalist(s)
Yrjö Saarela	Men's Greco-Roman light heavyweight	Henri Nielsen (DEN); W/f	Edward Nixson (GBR); W/f	Marcel Dubois (BEL); W/f	Carl Jensen (DEN); W/f	Verner Weckman (FIN); 2–1 L (W/f, L/f, L/f)	2nd place, silver medalist(s)
Verner Weckman	Men's Greco-Roman light heavyweight	Bye	William West (GBR); W/f	Fritz Larsson (SWE); W/f	Hugó Payr (HUN); W/f	Yrjö Saarela (FIN); 2–1 W (L/f, W/f, W/f)	1st place, gold medalist(s)

Ledend: W = win, L = loss, /f = by fall, /p by points

According to rumours, Weckman bribed Saarela to throw the light heavyweight final. Modern sportswriters Arto Teronen and Jouko Vuolle consider that there is plenty of circumstantial evidence in favour.

== Sources ==
- Cook, Theodore Andrea (May 1909). The Fourth Olympiad London 1908 Official Report (PDF). London: British Olympic Association. Archived from the original (PDF) on 28 May 2008.
