= Arvo Lindén =

Finnish wrestler (1887–1941)

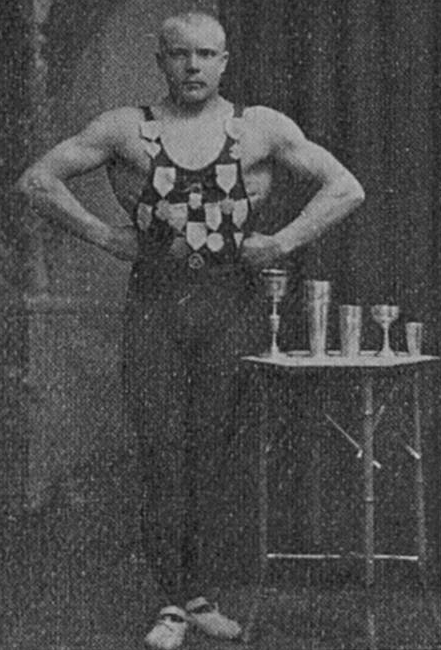
- Arvo Lindén circa 1907

Personal information
- Full name: Arvo Leander Linko
- Nickname: Foxterrieri
- National team: Finland
- Born: Arvo Leander Lindén; 27 February 1887 Tampere, Grand Duchy of Finland, Russian Empire
- Died: 18 March 1941 (aged 54) Helsinki, Finland
- Occupations: Shoemaker, postman, night watchman
- Height: 166 cm (5 ft 5 in)
- Weight: 64 kg (141 lb)

Sport
- Sport: Greco-Roman wrestling, diving
- Weight class: Lightweight
- Club: Tampereen Pyrintö (wrestling); Nahjus Athletic Club (wrestling); Helsingin Jyry (diving)
- Turned pro: 1923
- Coached by: Iivari Tuomisto (wrestling)
Medal record
Representing (Russia) Finland
Men's Greco-Roman wrestling
Olympic Games
Bronze medal – third place	1908 London	Lightweight

Arvo Leander Lindén, later Linko (27 February 1887 – 18 March 1941) was a Finnish wrestler who won an Olympic bronze medal in Greco-Roman wrestling in 1908.

== Wrestling ==
Lindén began wrestling at the age of eleven, and competitively in 1904, when he won the Häme Province lightweight championship.

He won Finnish wrestling championship in Greco-Roman under 60 kg class in 1908.

He won bronze at the 1908 Olympics, which was a single-elimination tournament:

Arvo Lindén at the 1908 Summer Olympics Greco-Roman lightweight
Round	Opponent	Result
First round	Lucien Hansen (BEL)	Win by fall at 2:33
Second round	Carl Carlsen (DEN)	Win by fall at 4:15
Quarter-finals	Anders Møller (DEN)	Win by fall at 13:32
Semi-finals	Nikolay Orlov (RU1)	Loss by points
Third place (best out of three)	Gunnar Persson (SWE)	Win by fall at 0:50
Third place (best out of three)	Gunnar Persson (SWE)	Win by fall at 2:25 (bronze)

His Olympic medal was auctioned for 3 500 euros in 2015.

He won the Russian championship twice. In 1909, it was split between him, Emil Väre and Nikolay Orlov. In 1910, he won it exclusively.

Soon after, neuropathic pain forced him to retire from wrestling.

He returned to wrestling by taking part in professional events in Port Arthur, Ontario in 1923, training and coaching at the Nahjus Athletic Club.

== Diving ==
He won the Finnish Workers' Sports Federation championship in plain platform jumps in 1929.

== Sources ==
- Siukonen, Markku (2001). Urheilukunniamme puolustajat. Suomen olympiaedustajat 1906–2000. Suuri olympiateos (in Finnish). Vol. 12. Jyväskylä: Graface. p. 182. ISBN 978-951-98673-1-1.
- Arvo Lindén at Olympedia
