= Kemppainen =

Kemppainen is a Finnish surname. Notable people with the surname include:

- Antti-Jussi Kemppainen (born 1989), Finnish freestyle skier
- Johan Kemp (né Kemppainen, 1881–1941), Finnish gymnast
- Joonas Kemppainen (born 1988), Finnish ice hockey player
- Marko Kemppainen (born 1976), Finnish sport shooter
- Roosa Kemppainen, a character in the Finnish television series Salatut elämät
- Tuulikki Pyykkönen (born 1963), Finnish cross-country skier
