= 1907 Finnish Athletics Championships =

The following are the results of the 1907 Finnish Athletics Championships. The games, known as Kalevan kisat in the Finnish language, were first held in 1907 in Tampere, Pirkanmaa, Finland.

== Results ==
Games	Gold		Silver		Bronze	
100 metres	Uuno Railo	11,0	Ragnar Stenberg	11,2	Oiva Jääskeläinen	11,5
400 metres	Ragnar Stenberg	54,7	Uuno Railo	55,1	Eino Pekkala	55,9
1500 metres	Fredrik Svanström	4.29,0	Heikki Korpimaa	4.39,5	Eino Pekkala	4.42,6
110 metre hurdles	Ragnar Stenberg	16,8	Uuno Railo	17,2	Eino Pekkala	17,4
Running	Ragnar Stenberg	339,35	Uuno Railo	338,63	Eino Pekkala	324,90
Relay race	Tampereen Pyrintö	48,4	—	—	—	—
One mile walk	Christian Nyberg	7.32,8	B. Rosenström	7,34,5	—	—
5000 m walk	Christian Nyberg	26.11,2	E. Lindberg	26.22,6	B. Rosenström	26.28,0
Walking	Christian Nyberg	166,43	B. Rosenström	165,09	E. Lindberg	162,95
High jump	Iivar Launis	310	Kalle Tuulos	305	Pauli Pohjola	305
Pole vault	Urho Aaltonen	580	Iivar Launis	575	Eino Pekkala	525
Long jump	Uuno Railo	12,33	Ragnar Stenberg	12,13	Oiva Jääskeläinen	12,07
Triple jump	Juho Halme	12,98	Eino Pekkala	12,89	Ragnar Stenberg	12,85
Jump championship	Iivar Launis	352,86	Eino Pekkala	346,18	Oiva Jääskeläinen	337,16
Shot put	Toimi Arranmaa	23,20	Eino Pekkala	21,96	Nikolai Gavrilik	21,76
Discus throw	Toimi Arranmaa	68,25	Nikolai Gavrilik	67,82	Eino Pekkala	64,18
Javelin throw	Oiva Jääskeläinen	83,12	Kalle Aaltonen	82,80	Urho Aaltonen	82,71
Throwing championship	Eino Pekkala	251,88	Nikolai Gavrilik	250,81	Toimi Arranmaa	250,65
Decathlon	Eino Pekkala	922,96	Oiva Jääskeläinen	891,74	Iivar Launis	881,75
