= Hallamaa =

Family name

Hallamaa (also spelled Hallama) is a Finnish-language surname.

Hallamaa has been a so-called protected surname. To prevent someone outside the family from taking the same name, Hallamaa was protected in 1988 by the Finnish Federation. Today, names are no longer protected, but all surnames are protected surnames.

Notable people with the surname include:

- Jaakko Hallama (1917–1996), Foreign Minister of Finland from 1963 to 1964
- Heikki Hallamaa (1867–1951), Finnish sport shooter
- Liisa Hallamaa (1925–2008), Finnish ceramist
- Reino Hallamaa (1899–1979), Finnish colonel
