= Shooting at the 1908 Summer Olympics – Men's 300 metre free rifle, three positions =

Olympic shooting event

Men's 300 metre free rifle, three positions at the Games of the IV Olympiad
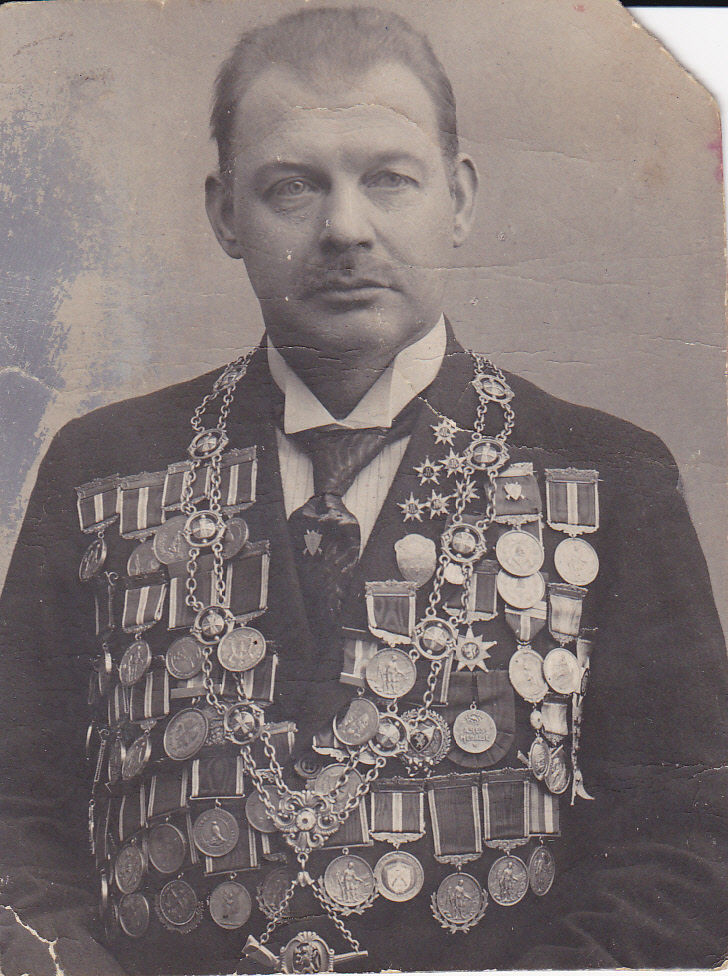
- Albert Helgerud
- Venue: Bisley rifle range
- Date: 11 July 1908
- Competitors: 51 from 10 nations
- Winning score: 909

Medalists
1st place, gold medalist(s)		Albert Helgerud; Norway
2nd place, silver medalist(s)		Harry Simon; United States
3rd place, bronze medalist(s)		Ole Sæther; Norway

The men's 300 m rifle three positions was one of 15 events on the shooting at the 1908 Summer Olympics programme. The competition was held on Saturday, 11 July 1908. Each nation could enter up to 12 shooters. Fifty-one sport shooters from ten nations competed. The event was won by Albert Helgerud of Norway, the nation's first victory in the event (after a bronze in 1900). Norway also won bronze, with Ole Sæther finishing third. Between the two Norwegians was Harry Simon, taking silver in the United States' debut.

== Background ==
This was the second appearance of the men's 300 metre three-positions rifle event, which was held 11 times between 1900 and 1972. Lars Jørgen Madsen of Denmark, who had taken fifth in 1900, was competing again. None of the world champions competed.

Finland, Great Britain, Hungary, Sweden, and the United States made their debut in the event. Belgium, Denmark, France, the Netherlands, and Norway each made their second appearance.

== Competition format ==
The competition had each shooter fire 120 shots, 40 shots in each of three positions: prone, kneeling, and standing. The target was 1 metre in diameter, with 10 scoring rings; targets were set at a distance of 300 metres. Thus, the maximum score possible was 1200 points. Any rifle could be used, with an open fore sight and any kind of back sight; any ammunition not "of a dangerous character" could be used. Uninterrupted strings of 10 shots were fired. Unlike in the last Games the event was contested, there were no medals for the individual positions; further, the team event was separated from the individual competition.

== Records ==
Prior to the competition, the existing world and Olympic records were as follows.

World record				
Olympic record	Emil Kellenberger (SUI)	930	Paris, France	5 August 1900

No new world or Olympic records were set during the competition.

== Schedule ==
Date	Time	Round
Saturday, 11 July 1908		Final

== Results ==
Each shooter fired 120 shots at the target 300 metres distant. Forty shots were fired from each of three positions—standing, kneeling, and prone. Each hit could score between 1 and 10 points, with the highest possible score being 1200 points.

Rank	Shooter	Nation	Score			
Rank	Shooter	Nation	Standing	Kneeling	Prone	Total
1st place, gold medalist(s)	Albert Helgerud	Norway	277	292	340	909
2nd place, silver medalist(s)	Harry Simon	United States	228	294	365	887
3rd place, bronze medalist(s)	Ole Sæther	Norway	272	284	327	883
4	Gustav-Adolf Sjöberg	Sweden	251	285	338	874
5	Janne Gustafsson	Sweden	265	283	324	872
6	Julius Braathe	Norway	257	291	303	851
7	Axel Jansson	Sweden	235	296	312	843
8	Léon Johnson	France	250	282	303	835
9	Olaf Sæther	Norway	240	291	299	830
10	Jesse Wallingford	Great Britain	201	303	324	828
11	Maurice Blood	Great Britain	201	290	334	825
12	Per-Olof Arvidsson	Sweden	236	277	310	823
13	Georg Erdmann	Norway	234	277	310	821
14	Lars Jørgen Madsen	Denmark	236	294	283	813
15	Gustaf Adolf Jonsson	Sweden	226	267	319	812
16	Edward Green	United States	190	276	326	792
17	Voitto Kolho	Finland	231	269	288	788
18	Christian Pedersen	Denmark	191	278	311	780
19	Kolbjørn Kvam	Norway	234	267	276	777
20	Arthur Jackson	Great Britain	187	249	335	771
21	Hans Schultz	Denmark	223	257	289	769
22	Pieter van Waas	Netherlands	188	285	295	768
23	Fredrik Mossberg	Sweden	174	288	299	761
24	Olivius Skymoen	Norway	206	240	314	760
25	Paul Colas	France	231	233	293	759
26	Robert Hawkins	Great Britain	189	273	301	752
26	Per Olaf Olsen	Norway	222	237	293	752
28	Erik Ohlsson	Sweden	174	271	306	751
29	John Hession	United States	176	233	337	746
30	Frans Nässling	Finland	221	244	268	733
31	Maurice Lecoq	France	196	280	254	730
32	Piet ten Bruggen Cate	Netherlands	216	238	271	726
33	Niels Laursen	Denmark	202	224	286	712
34	André Angelini	France	154	247	305	706
35	Ernest Ista	Belgium	169	232	300	701
36	Fernand Rey	Belgium	169	245	284	698
37	Huvi Tuiskunen	Finland	193	246	256	697
38	Heikki Huttunen	Finland	204	212	270	686
39	Lauri Kolho	Finland	171	236	265	672
40	Henry Chaney	Great Britain	140	240	291	671
41	Emil Nässling	Finland	204	234	219	657
42	Poul Liebst	Denmark	187	197	261	645
43	Sándor Prokopp	Hungary	144	236	247	627
44	Gustaf Nyman	Finland	200	166	249	615
45	Karl Reilin	Finland	217	174	193	584
46	Heikki Hallamaa	Finland	165	181	230	576
47	Mathias Glomnes	Norway	—	250	313	563
48	Niels Christian Christensen	Denmark	202	—	299	501
49	Kálmán Móricz	Hungary	122	179	189	490
50	Ossian Jörgensen	Sweden	—	112	308	420
51	Lorents Jensen	Denmark	46	—	275	321
