= James Bostock (sport shooter) =

British sports shooter

Personal information
- Born: 28 April 1874 Stoke-on-Trent, England
- Died: 6 February 1948 (aged 73)

Sport
- Sport: Sports shooting

James Bostock OBE (28 April 1874 – 6 February 1948) was a British sports shooter. After gaining experience from the military as a shooter, he competed in the team 300 metre free rifle event at the 1908 Summer Olympics.
