= Thomas Head Raddall =

Canadian writer (1903–1994)

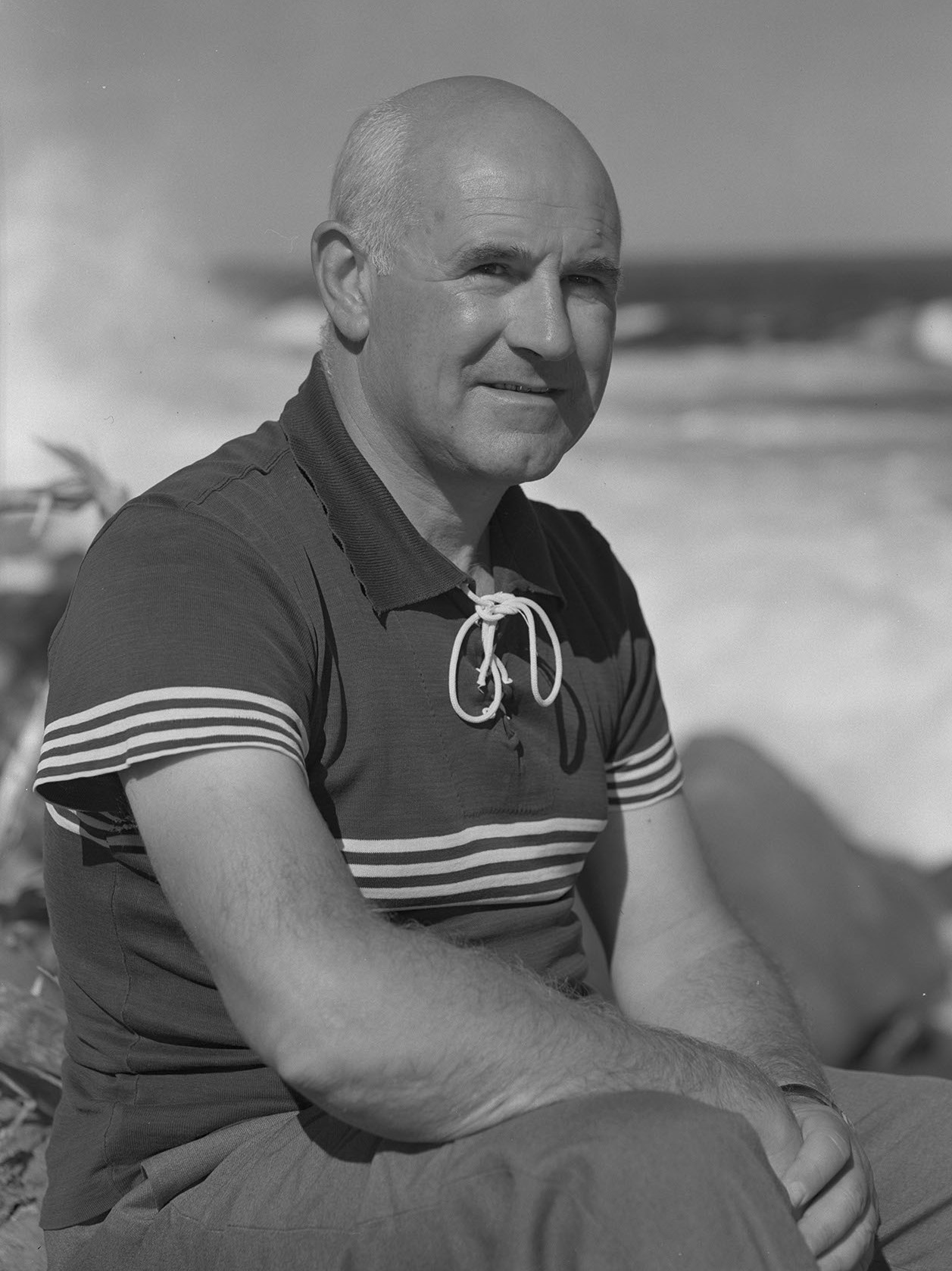
- Raddall, c. 1958
- Born: 13 November 1903; Hythe, England
- Died: 1 April 1994 (aged 90)
- Occupation: writer

Thomas Head Raddall OC FRSC (13 November 1903 – 1 April 1994) was a Canadian writer of history and historical fiction.

== Early life ==
Raddall was born in Hythe, Kent, England, in 1903, the son of an Army officer, also named Thomas Head Raddall, and Ellen (née Gifford) Raddall. In 1913, the family moved to Nova Scotia, where his father had taken a training position with the Canadian Militia. The elder Raddall then saw active service during the First World War and was killed in action at Amiens in August 1918.

Raddall attended Chebucto School in Halifax until 6 December 1917, when the school was converted into a temporary morgue in the wake of the Halifax Explosion. The Raddall family survived the explosion and Raddall wrote about it in his memoirs, In My Time.

At the age of fifteen, Raddall trained at the Canadian School of Telegraphy in Halifax and shortly thereafter started working at the age of 18 as a marine telegraph operator for the Marconi Wireless Telegraph Company.

Raddall's first job was as a wireless operator on seagoing ships, including the CS Mackay-Bennett, and stationed on land at Camperdown Signal Station and at isolated wireless posts such as Sable Island. He later took a job as a clerk at a pulp and paper mill in Liverpool, Nova Scotia, where he began his writing career. There, Raddall came in contact with the master American swindler and fugitive from justice, Leo Koretz, who was using the alias, Lou Keyte.

== Career as a writer ==
Raddall was a prolific, award-winning writer. He received Governor General's Awards for three of his books, The Pied Piper of Dipper Creek (1943), Halifax, Warden of the North (1948) and The Path of Destiny (1957). He was made an Officer of the Order of Canada in 1971.

Raddall is best known for his historical fiction, but he also published numerous non-fictional historical works. His interest in historical research grew when he was stationed at historical locations as a wireless operator, and he received crucial encouragement and assistance from Harry Piers, Curator of the Nova Scotia Museum, who became his mentor. Raddall's early works included studies of privateering, civic and marine history, and Canada during the War of 1812. His history of Halifax, Warden of the North, remains influential.

== Historical preservation and restoration ==
Raddall worked with the Queens County Historical Society, the Historic Sites Advisory Council of Nova Scotia, and the Historic Sites and Monuments Board of Canada. He played a role in preserving the diary of Simeon Perkins, an early colonial document published in three volumes (the fourth has yet to be published) between 1948 and 1978 by the Champlain Society, and edited by Harold Innis, D. C. Harvey and C. B. Ferguson. Raddall helped to restore and preserve Perkins House Museum, a colonial house built by Simeon Perkins that is now a part of the Nova Scotia Museum system.

== Legacy ==
An exact replica of Raddall's study, furnished with his possessions, is on view at the Thomas Raddall Research Centre, administered by the Queens County Historical Society, of which Raddall was a founding member in 1929.

His correspondence is housed at the Dalhousie University Archives, which also runs the Thomas Raddall Electronic Archive Project, currently digitizing his published and unpublished writings.

The Thomas Head Raddall Award is a literary award administered for the best work of adult fiction published in the previous year by a writer from Canada's Atlantic provinces.

The Thomas Raddall Provincial Park is a park in Nova Scotia named for Raddall.

== Bibliography ==
- At the Tide's Turn and Other Stories
- The Cape Breton Giant and Other Writings
- Courage in the Storm
- The Dreamers
- Footsteps on Old Floors: True Tales of Mystery - 1968
- The Governor's Lady - 1960
- Halifax, Warden of the North - 1948; revised edition - 1971
- Hangman's Beach
- His Majesty's Yankees - 1942
- In My Time: A Memoir - 1976
- The Markland Sagas, With a Discussion of Their Relation to Nova Scotia
- The Mersey Story
- A Muster of Arms and Other Stories
- The Nymph and the Lamp - 1950
- Path of Destiny: Canada From the British Conquest to Home Rule - 1957
- A Pictorial Guide to Historic Nova Scotia, Featuring Louisbourg, Peggy's Cove, Sable Island
- The Pied Piper of Dipper Creek and Other Tales
- Pride's Fancy - 1948
- Roger Sudden - 1946
- The Rover: The Story of a Canadian Privateer - 1958
- The Saga of the "Rover"
- Son of the Hawk - 1950
- Tambour and Other Stories
- This Is Nova Scotia, Canada's Ocean Playground
- Tidefall - 1953
- The Wedding Gift and Other Stories
  - Das Hochzeitsgeschenk, in Kanadische Erzähler der Gegenwart. Hgg. Armin Arnold, Walter E. Riedel. Manesse, Zürich 1967, 1986, p 11 – 38
- West Novas: A History of the West Nova Scotia Regiment
- The Wings of Night - 1957
