= Camperdown Signal Station =

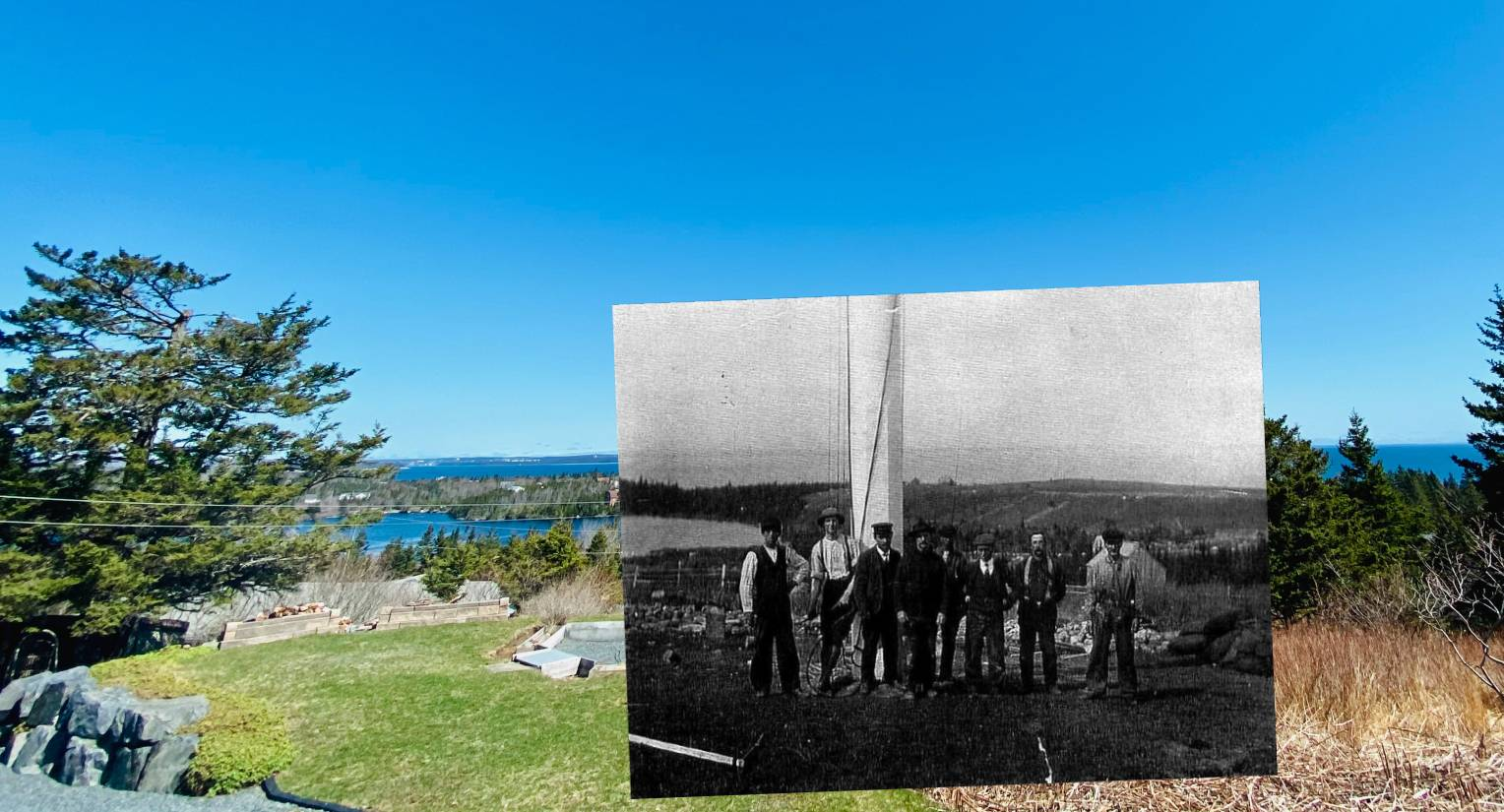
This is the crew erecting the antenna at Camperdown 1905 with a modern backdrop

Camperdown Signal Station, also known as Camperdown Hill, is significant in Nova Scotia communication history. Overlooking the entrance to Halifax Harbour made it a strategic part of Halifax's defence system in the 18th century. The hill has been used as a customs lookout, signal and telegraph station, observation post and redoubt commanding the Citadel Hill defence complex. The Camperdown Signal Station was built a few miles northward next to nearby Portuguese Cove in 1797, the first of a series of signal stations built by Prince Edward, Duke of Kent. It later became a wireless station and was operational until 1925. The military took over operating the station and it became known as VCS from 1935 until 1970.

== History ==
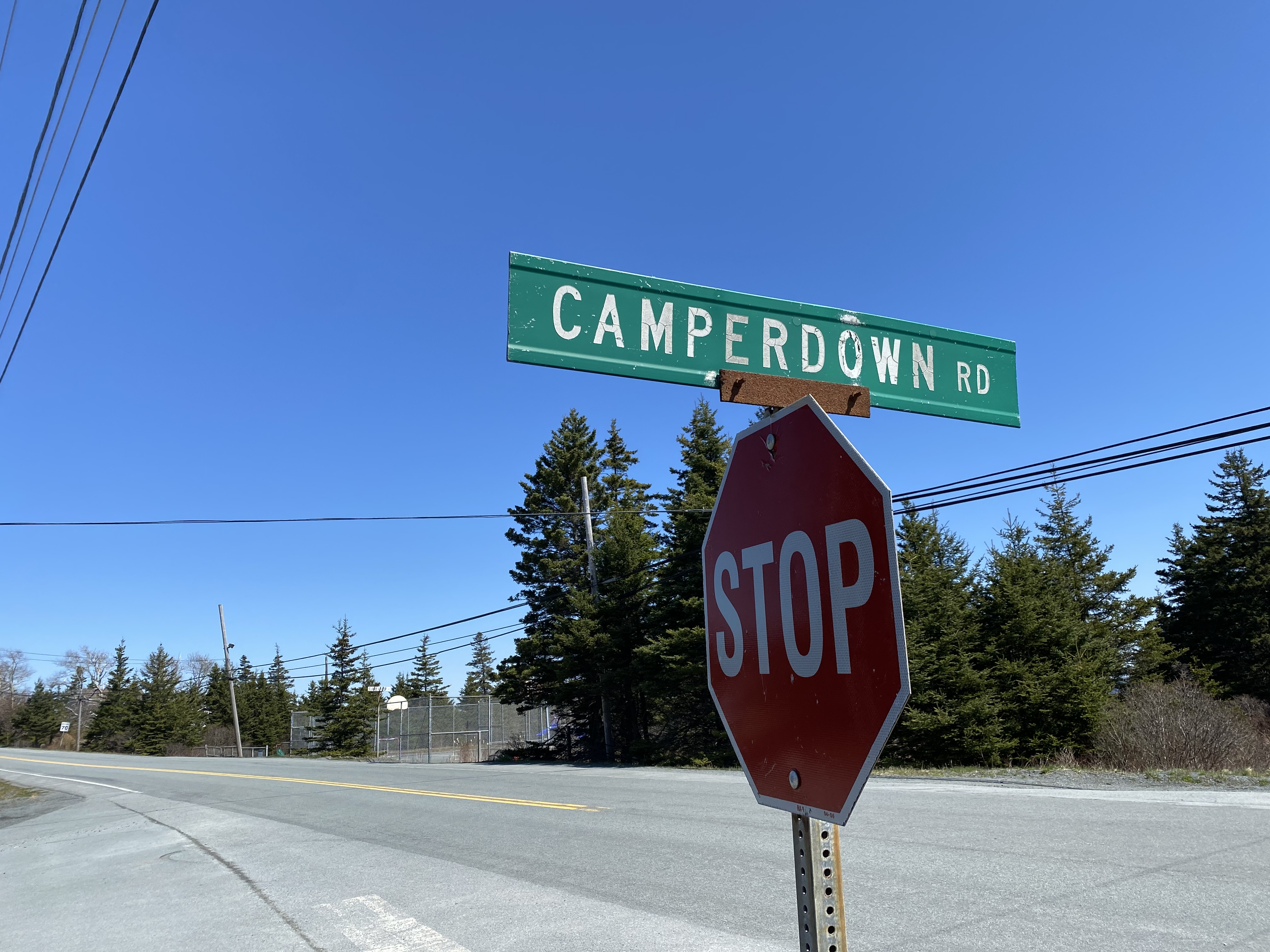
All that remains of the station is the road name.

The station was put in service during the American Revolution, around 1776. It was operated by members of the Army until 1923, after which service was provided by a few civilian signalmen until 1953. This signal building was torn down and replaced by the Port War Signal Station in 1941. The Port War Signal Station was operated by naval signalmen until turned back to the civilian signalmen in 1945.

Operating position Camperdown Radio 1950's. The main receiver was an RCA AR88, A Canadian Marconi CSR5 receiver with a Philips BX925. The transmitters at this station were LCS5 and a Canadian Marconi Company LTT4. The hand key was used for the continental code over the radio. A semi-automatic key and telegraph landline sounder for the American or Morse Code (a faster code) was also used in the station at this time.

The first Radio Direction Finding Station in Canada opened at the site in 1917 with call sign VAV. The Marconi Company closed Camperdown VCS in 1926. The service provided by the VCS station was moved to VAV at that time. This combined service from VAV was from 1926 until 1935.

The Dominion Government Steamer (DGS) 'Canada' was the first ship to contact the Camperdown Wireless Station, on June 19, 1905. She was one of the first three Canadian ships fitted with wireless in 1904. Her wireless call sign was CT then MCT and then VDC.

== Station Operators ==
- Thomas Raddall was a Canadian writer of history and historical fiction.

== Equipment ==
In 1921 the equipment at Camperdown VCS consisted of a 2 kilowatt, nonasynchronous disc, 60-cycle Marconi coast station spark transmitter. This received its power from a generator driven by a 6 HP Fairbanks Morse 2-type engine. Also, a 1/4 kilowatt asynchronous disc 500-cycle Marconi cabinet type spark set, powered by a battery which was kept charged from a 1-1/2 HP engine and generator. The main receiver was a Marconi crystal type 2846A. A magnetic detector (ancestor of the wire recorder) formed part of an auxiliary receiver. The aerial was a four-wire umbrella suspended from a 180-foot mast.
