= Niels Christian Christensen =

Danish sport shooter (1881–1945)

Personal information
- Born: 1 January 1881 Nordjylland, Denmark
- Died: 18 May 1945 (aged 64) Midtjylland, Denmark

Sport
- Sport: Sports shooting

Niels Christian Olesen Christensen (1 January 1881 – 18 May 1945) was a Danish sport shooter who competed in the 1908 Summer Olympics.

He was born in Sundby but represented the club Kjøbenhavns Skytteforening. In the 1908 Summer Olympics he finished fourth in the team free rifle event, eighth in the ream military rifle event and 48th in the 300 metre free rifle event. He died in 1945 in Århus.
