= Wrestling at the 1908 Summer Olympics – Men's Greco-Roman lightweight =

Men's lightweight Greco-Roman wrestling at the Games of the IV Olympiad
- Venue: White City Stadium
- Dates: July 23 (R32 through semis); July 25 (final, bronze match)
- Competitors: 25 from 10 nations

Medalists
1st place, gold medalist(s)		Enrico Porro	Italy
2nd place, silver medalist(s)		Nikolay Orlov	Russian Empire
3rd place, bronze medalist(s)		Arvo Lindén	Finland

The Greco-Roman lightweight was one of four Greco-Roman wrestling weight classes contested on the Wrestling at the 1908 Summer Olympics programme. Like all other wrestling events, it was open only to men. The lightweight was the lightest weight class, allowing wrestlers up to 66.6 kilograms (147 lb). Each nation could enter up to 12 wrestlers.

== Competition format ==
The event was a single-elimination tournament with a bronze medal match between the semifinal losers. The final and bronze medal match were best two-of-three, while all other rounds were a single bout. Bouts were 15 minutes, unless one wrestler lost by fall (two shoulders on the ground at the same time). Other than falls, decisions were made by the judges or, if they did not agree, the referee.

Wrestlers could "take hold only from the head and not lower than the waist." The "hair, flesh, ears, private parts, or clothes may not be seized"; striking, scratching, twisting fingers, tripping, and grabbing legs were prohibited. Holds "obtained that the fear of breakage or dislocation of a limb shall cause the wrestler to give the fall" were outlawed, and particularly the double-nelson, arm up back with bar on, hammerlock, strangle, half-strangle, hang, and flying mare with palm uppermost.

== Results ==
=== Standings ===
Place	Wrestler	Nation
1	Enrico Porro	Italy
2	Nikolay Orlov	Russia
3	Arvo Lindén	Finland
4	Gunnar Persson	Sweden
5	Gustaf Malmström	Sweden
5	József Maróthy	Hungary
5	Anders Møller	Denmark
5	Ödön Radvány	Hungary
9	Ernest Blount	Great Britain
9	Ulferd Bruseker	Netherlands
9	Carl Carlsen	Denmark
9	George Faulkner	Great Britain
9	Albert Hawkins	Great Britain
9	Téger József	Hungary
9	Carl Erik Lund	Sweden
9	William Wood	Great Britain
17	Christian Carlsen	Denmark
17	Karel Halík	Bohemia
17	Lucien Hansen	Belgium
17	George MacKenzie	Great Britain
17	Jacob van Moppes	Netherlands
17	Albert Rose	Great Britain
17	William Ruff	Great Britain
17	Fernand Steens	Belgium
17	Albert Whittingstall	Great Britain

=== Bracket ===
First Round
Fall (2:33)
Arvo Lindén (FIN)
Lucien Hansen (BEL)
Fall (9:00)
Carl Carlsen (DEN)
Fernand Steens (BEL)
Fall (3:59)
Anders Møller (DEN)
Albert Whittingstall (GBR)
Fall (18:35)
Ödön Radvány (HUN)
William Ruff (GBR)
Fall (1:10)
Albert Hawkins (GBR)
Christian Carlsen (DEN)
Decision
József Téger (HUN)
Jacob van Moppes (NED)
Fall (3:35)
Gustaf Malmström (SWE)
George MacKenzie (GBR)
Fall (14:59)
József Maróthy (HUN)
Albert Rose (GBR)
Decision
William Wood (GBR)
Karel Halík (BOH)

Second Round
Fall (4:15)
Arvo Lindén (FIN)
Carl Carlsen (DEN)
Fall (11:18)
Anders Møller (DEN)
George Faulkner (GBR)
Fall (10:46)
Nikolay Orlov (RU1)
Carl Erik Lund (SWE)
Fall (0:17)
Ödön Radvány (HUN)
Albert Hawkins (GBR)
Decision
Enrico Porro (ITA)
József Téger (HUN)
Fall (3:20)
Gustaf Malmström (SWE)
Ulferd Bruseker (NED)
Fall (7:06)
Gunnar Persson (SWE)
Ernest Blount (GBR)
Decision
József Maróthy (HUN)
William Wood (GBR)

Quarter-finals
Fall (13:32)
Arvo Lindén (FIN)
Anders Møller (DEN)
Fall (7:16)
Nikolay Orlov (RU1)
Ödön Radvány (HUN)
Decision
Enrico Porro (ITA)
Gustaf Malmström (SWE)
Gunnar Persson (SWE)
József Maróthy retired

Semi-finals
Decision
Arvo Lindén (FIN)
Nikolay Orlov (RU1)
Fall (2:05)
Enrico Porro (ITA)
Gunnar Persson (SWE)

Final
2–0 (decision/decision)
Nikolay Orlov (RU1) (silver)
Enrico Porro (ITA) (gold)
Third place
Arvo Lindén (FIN) (bronze)
Gunnar Persson (SWE)

== Sources ==
- Cook, Theodore Andrea (1908). The Fourth Olympiad, Being the Official Report. London: British Olympic Association.
- De Wael, Herman (2001). "Greco-Roman Wrestling 1908". Herman's Full Olympians. Archived from the original on 1 March 2005.
