= Thomas Raddall (sports shooter) =

British sports shooter (1876–1918)

Thomas Head Raddall
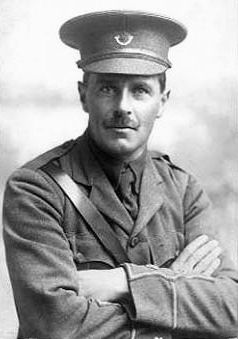

Personal information
- Born: 9 December 1876 Farnborough, Hampshire, England
- Died: 9 August 1918 (aged 41) Méharicourt, Somme, France

Sport
- Sport: Sports shooting

Thomas Head Raddall DSO (9 December 1876 – 9 August 1918) was a British sports shooter. He competed in the team 300 metre free rifle event at the 1908 Summer Olympics. He was killed in action during World War I in France, having attained the rank of Lieutenant-Colonel in the Canadian Infantry and been awarded the DSO. He was buried at the Commonwealth military Manitoba Cemetery at Caix, France, and left a widow, Ellen, who was resident in Halifax, Nova Scotia, Canada. His son was Canadian writer Thomas Head Raddall.

== See also ==
- List of Olympians killed in World War I
