= Shooting at the 1908 Summer Olympics – Men's 300 metre free rifle, team =

Sports shooting at the Olympics

Men's team 300 metre free rifle at the Games of the IV Olympiad
- Shooting pictogram
- Venue: Bisley rifle range
- Dates: 9–10 July 1908
- Competitors: 54 from 9 nations
- Winning score: 5055

Medalists
1st place, gold medalist(s)		Norway: Julius Braathe; Albert Helgerud; Einar Liberg; Olaf Sæther; Ole Sæther; Gudbrand Skatteboe
2nd place, silver medalist(s)		Sweden: Per-Olof Arvidsson; Janne Gustafsson; Axel Jansson; Gustaf Adolf Jonsson; Claës Rundberg; Gustav-Adolf Sjöberg
3rd place, bronze medalist(s)		France: Eugène Balme; Albert Courquin; Raoul de Boigne; Léon Johnson; Maurice Lecoq; André Parmentier

The men's team free rifle at 300 metres was one of 15 events on the shooting at the 1908 Summer Olympics programme. The competition was held on Thursday, 9 July 1908 and was extended after sunset to Friday, 10 July 1908 — it was the first shooting event of the Games. Fifty-four sport shooters from nine nations competed. The event was won by the team from Norway, improving on their second-place finish in 1900. Sweden made its debut in the event, taking silver. France repeated as bronze medalists.

Ole Sæther was the first man to earn multiple medals in the event, having been on the 1900 Norwegian team as well as this year's squad.

== Background ==
This was the second appearance of the men's 300 metre team rifle event, which was held 4 times between 1900 and 1920.

The teams used different rifles. France shot with a Swiss Martini; Denmark used a Krag-Jørgensen; Greece and the Netherlands shot with a Mannlicher; Sweden used a government-issue Mauser; and Finland shot with a Mofferd. Norway used private match rifles. Due to winds blowing against the players, teams with light rifles faced more difficulty.

Reigning Olympic champions Switzerland did not return. Finland, Great Britain, Greece, and Sweden each made their debut in the event. Belgium, Denmark, France, the Netherlands, and Norway each made their second appearance.

== Competition format ==
The competition had each shooter fire 120 shots, 40 shots in each of three positions: prone, kneeling, and standing. The target was 1 metre in diameter, with 10 scoring rings; targets were set at a distance of 300 metres. The six team members' scores were then summed. Thus, the maximum score possible was 7200 points. The scores for the team event were separate from the individual event this time.

== Schedule ==
Date	Time	Round
Thursday, 9 July 1908; Friday, 10 July 1908		Final

== Results ==
Teams consisted of six shooters, with each shooter firing 120 shots at the target 300 metres distant. 40 shots were fired from each of three positions—standing, kneeling, and prone. A bulls-eye counted for 10 points, and thus the highest possible score for each shooter was 1200 points, with the team maximum being 7200.

Rank	Nation	Shooter	Score			
Rank	Nation	Shooter	Standing	Kneeling	Prone	Total
1st place, gold medalist(s)	Norway	Team total	1549	1651	1855	5055
1st place, gold medalist(s)	Norway	Albert Helgerud	259	303	312	874
1st place, gold medalist(s)	Norway	Ole Sæther	274	281	310	865
1st place, gold medalist(s)	Norway	Gudbrand Skatteboe	247	277	317	841
1st place, gold medalist(s)	Norway	Olaf Sæther	237	283	320	840
1st place, gold medalist(s)	Norway	Julius Braathe	249	272	305	826
1st place, gold medalist(s)	Norway	Einar Liberg	283	235	291	809
2nd place, silver medalist(s)	Sweden	Team total	1267	1566	1878	4711
2nd place, silver medalist(s)	Sweden	Gustaf Adolf Jonsson	238	289	313	840
2nd place, silver medalist(s)	Sweden	Per-Olof Arvidsson	233	268	311	812
2nd place, silver medalist(s)	Sweden	Axel Jansson	228	263	310	801
2nd place, silver medalist(s)	Sweden	Gustav-Adolf Sjöberg	210	238	312	760
2nd place, silver medalist(s)	Sweden	Claës Rundberg	160	265	334	759
2nd place, silver medalist(s)	Sweden	Janne Gustafsson	198	243	298	739
3rd place, bronze medalist(s)	France	Team total	1250	1539	1863	4652
3rd place, bronze medalist(s)	France	Léon Johnson	225	313	298	836
3rd place, bronze medalist(s)	France	Eugène Balme	230	250	321	801
3rd place, bronze medalist(s)	France	André Parmentier	206	264	303	773
3rd place, bronze medalist(s)	France	Albert Courquin	203	235	330	768
3rd place, bronze medalist(s)	France	Maurice Lecoq	222	240	294	756
3rd place, bronze medalist(s)	France	Raoul de Boigne	164	237	317	718
4	Denmark	Team total	1244	1534	1765	4543
4	Denmark	Niels Andersen	163	249	313	725
4	Denmark	Lars Jørgen Madsen	240	297	279	816
4	Denmark	Ole Olsen	214	257	283	754
4	Denmark	Niels Christian Christensen	209	249	294	752
4	Denmark	Christian Pedersen	227	224	297	748
4	Denmark	Hans Schultz	191	258	299	748
5	Belgium	Team total	1229	1507	1773	4509
5	Belgium	Charles Paumier du Verger	217	296	313	826
5	Belgium	Paul Van Asbroeck	222	237	328	787
5	Belgium	Ernest Ista	224	270	292	786
5	Belgium	Henri Sauveur	206	241	319	766
5	Belgium	Joseph Geens	215	259	266	740
5	Belgium	Édouard Poty	145	204	255	604
6	Great Britain	Team total	999	1519	1837	4355
6	Great Britain	Jesse Wallingford	188	284	317	789
6	Great Britain	Harold Hawkins	201	268	307	776
6	Great Britain	Charles Churcher	162	270	328	760
6	Great Britain	Thomas Raddall	195	246	313	754
6	Great Britain	James Bostock	126	246	296	668
6	Great Britain	Robert Brown	127	205	276	608
7	Netherlands	Team total	965	1427	1738	4130
7	Netherlands	Gerard van den Bergh	176	273	302	751
7	Netherlands	Christiaan Brosch	179	234	295	708
7	Netherlands	Cornelis van Altenburg	149	249	291	689
7	Netherlands	Antonie de Gee	164	254	266	684
7	Netherlands	Uilke Vuurman	145	231	277	653
7	Netherlands	Jan Brussaard	152	186	307	645
8	Finland	Team total	1182	1324	1456	3962
8	Finland	Frans Nässling	222	253	242	717
8	Finland	Gustaf Nyman	199	249	252	700
8	Finland	Heikki Huttunen	184	221	239	644
8	Finland	Voitto Kolho	209	216	217	642
8	Finland	Emil Nässling	181	190	266	637
8	Finland	Huvi Tuiskunen	187	195	240	622
9	Greece	Team total	848	1311	1630	3789
9	Greece	Ioannis Theofilakis	162	248	302	712
9	Greece	Matthias Triantafyllidis	149	227	277	653
9	Greece	Alexandros Theofilakis	160	216	269	645
9	Greece	Georgios Orphanidis	117	242	263	622
9	Greece	Defkalion Rediadis	155	190	274	619
9	Greece	Frangiskos Mavrommatis	105	188	245	538
