= Harry Simon (sport shooter) =

American sport shooter

Harry Eugene Simon
Personal information
- Born: July 13, 1873 Wood County, Ohio
- Died: June 8, 1932 (aged 58) Catawba Island, Lakeside, Ohio
- Spouse: Emma A. Miller
- Children: 6
Medal record
Men's Shooting
Silver medal – second place	1908 London	300 m free rifle

Harry Eugene Simon (July 13, 1873 – June 8, 1932) was an American sport shooter who competed in the 1908 Summer Olympics, and won a silver medal.

Simon was a lieutenant in the 6th Ohio Infantry in 1908 when the free rifle event for the London Olympics took place. The event was shot at three positions, a method rarely used in the United States, where it was only shot kneeling or prone. Thus, it was not anticipated that the U.S. would perform well in the event, but Simon performed exceptionally. He scored the highest in both the prone and kneeling positions of the competition, with his score being lowered to second only by his standing score.

Surprising the Olympic competition, he won a silver medal in 300 metre free rifle event. He took 19th place in the individual free rifle competition, scoring 86 points out of a possible 100 at the distance of 1,000 yards.

In 1912, he won the World Individual Championship Cup in shooting at Bayonne, Biarritz, France, while a member of the United States Rifle Team. That year, he also placed second in a rifle competition held at Bisley Range near London. While in the US Army service, he reached the rank of Captain.

He was born in Wood County, Ohio and died at his family home at Catawba Island, in Ottawa County, Ohio. Catawba is on the Northern coast of Ohio, and at least at one time was an island in Lake Erie. He had been ill for a long period and died at his home on Catawba Island. He was buried at the Sackett Cemetery in Danbury, Ohio, Southeast of Catawba. He was survived by a wife, Emma A. Miller, five sons, and a daughter.
