= Jesse Wallingford =

British sport shooter

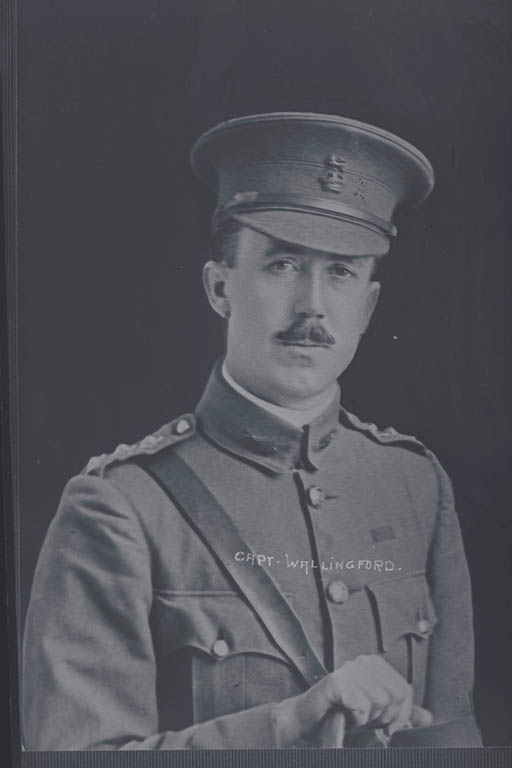
- Portrait of Captain Jesse Wallingford

Personal information
- Born: 25 January 1872 Woolwich, London, England
- Died: 6 June 1944 (aged 72) Auckland, New Zealand

Sport
- Sport: Sports shooting
Medal record
Men's shooting
Representing United Kingdom
Olympic Games
Bronze medal – third place	1908 London	Team pistol

Jesse Alfred Wallingford (25 January 1872 – 6 June 1944) was a British sport shooter, who competed in the 1908 Summer Olympics. He was also an assistant adjutant with the New Zealand Army, during World War One.

In the 1908 Olympics, Wallingford won a bronze medal in the team pistol event. He was also fifth in the individual pistol event, sixth in team free rifle event and tenth in 300 m free rifle event. The same year, he set a mad minute record, scoring 36 hits in one minute on a 48-inch target at 300 yards.

== Military service ==
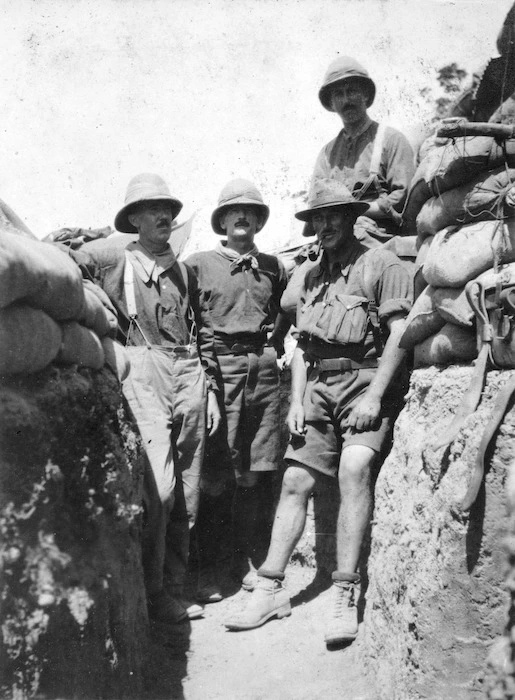
A group of New Zealand officers at Gallipoli in 1915; Wallingford stands on the left

Wallingford completed his training with the British Army in 1911 at the School of Musketry, Hythe, England. He later accepted a role in New Zealand as the chief instructor of musketry. He served as assistant adjutant in the Auckland Infantry Battn in Penrose, Auckland, where he supervised rifle training of the Expeditionary Force. He then left for Europe with the main group of the force, leading snipers and machine gunners on the peninsula.

He was awarded a Military Cross in 1915 for his bravery in directing the Battalion during operations near Gaba Tepe, Gallipoli. His actions in service were recorded in The Auckland Regiment by OE Burn in 1922:

On the afternoon of the 27th, Wallingford greatly distinguished himself. The position above Walker's was obscure, doubtful and dangerous. Arriving on the scene, he found that the casualties had been very heavy, that the Turks had obtained complete superiority of fire and were apparently massing, ready to storm over the disheartened few who were still holding on. No one was in charge. In perilous times, the boldest measures are always the best. Wallingford saw that to attack, to get on the offensive, was the only thing that could save the situation. He told the men around that he was going forward. It seemed certain death, but he made the venture, not knowing whether any would follow. Twenty yards for-ward, thirty yards—and the Turkish fire was very hot for-ward still, and then down in a little patch of partially dead ground. Here, between the lines was a machine-gun. It was jammed and out of order; belt and spare parts were lying around in confusion. The crew had been killed, with the exception of Preston, who, wounded as he was, stayed by his gun, although he could not put it to rights. For the master gunner it was but a moment's work, and the gun was rattling away, "Rat-tat-tat, rat-tat-tat," and the Turks who were a moment ago insolently showing themselves were shot down. For hours Wallingford and Preston held on, despite every effort of the Turks to dislodge them. The deadly rifle of the great marksman, and the still more deadly bursts of machine-gun fire made short work of any venturesome Turks who dared to show themselves. Their fire slackened. Then the worn-out men behind took fresh courage, and came round the machine-gun. The position was once more secure. It was characteristic of Captain Wallingford that his next business was to get the wounded clear. With the exception of Dr. Craig, no man was ever keener on salvaging the poor broken sufferers on the battlefield than this fighting soldier, of whom it is literally true to say that, like Saul of old, "he had slain his thousands." In those early critical days the fiery enthusiasm, the tireless energy, the stark valour of this man were invaluable. It was he "who gave us the courage."

Wallingford became known as the 'human machine gun' due to his accuracy and skill in shooting, with an estimated 5,000 Turkish troops being killed in the charge. Renowned for his abilities, Wallingford was depicted in a news article in September 1915:

Most people have heard already of the prowess of Captain Wallingford, who was, and probably still is, the finest shot in the British Army. The British Army claims that he is the greatest shot in the world. A member of his company, who has come back to New Zealand with a wound which almost proved mortal, relates with pride some of Captain Wallingford's exploits. In a letter home, it may be remembered that this officer wrote that after several weeks at the front, that day was the first on which he had not killed a Turk. This mail left the front on June 27th and he claims that Captain. Wallingford's 'tally' up to that time with the rifle alone, leaving out of account altogether the terrible machine-gun, was over 700. As a marksman he is a wizard.

In 1919, Wallingford received the title of Major until his retirement from the army in 1927, after forty-two years of service.

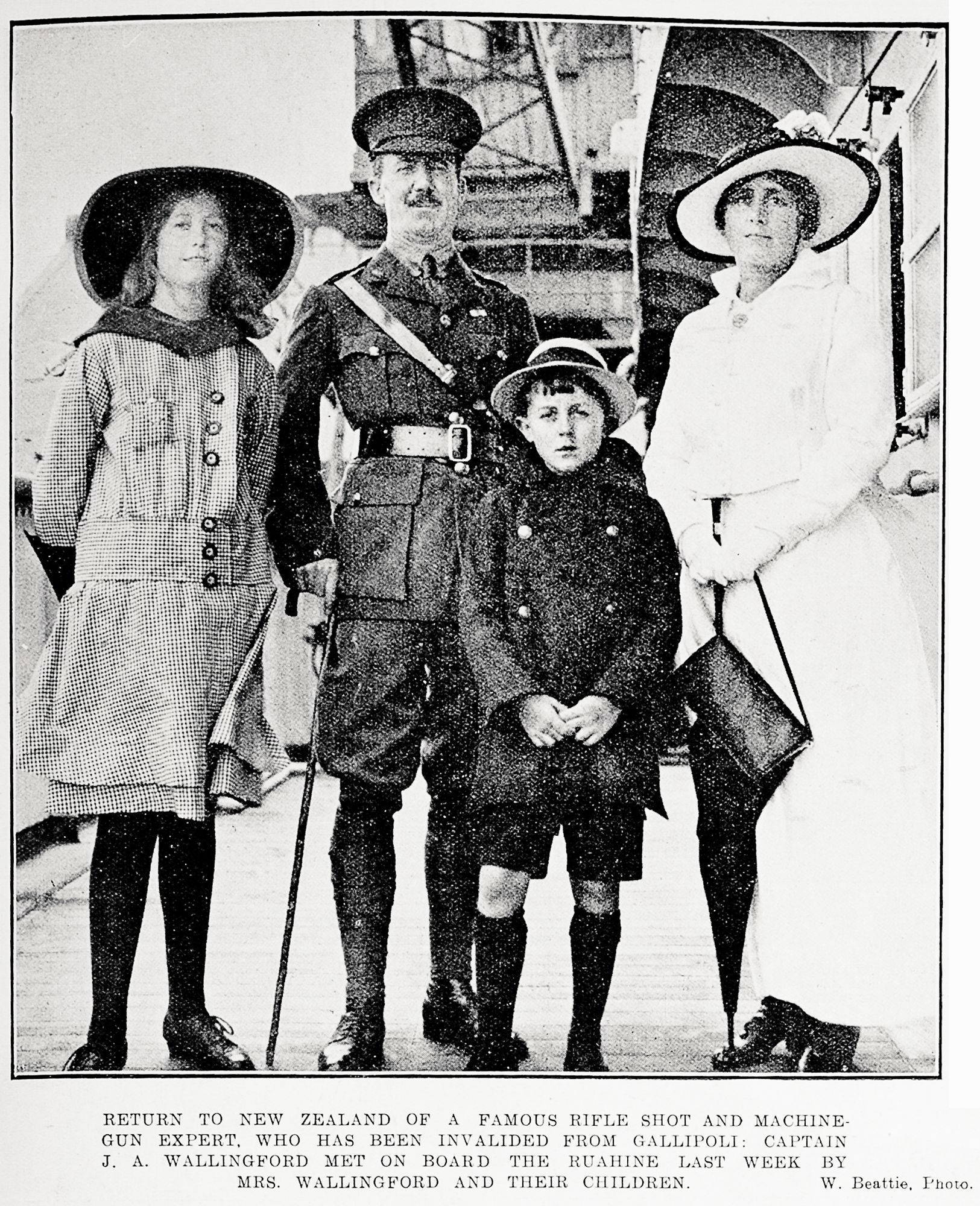
Captain J. A. Wallingford met on board the Ruahine by Mrs. Wallingford and their children, 1916.

== Personal life ==
Jessie Alfred Wallingford was born 25 June 1871 in Woolwich, England. He was the second of ten children born to mother Phoebe Holloway (b.1846.) father Frederick Plumroy Wallingford (b.1839). He spent his childhood living in Woolwich, Dover, India and Winchester. Joining service in India in 1885 as part of his father's Regiment.

In 1897 he married Alice Wallingford (b. 1871, nee Bishopp). They had five children Sidney, who served in the Royal New Zealand Air Force during World War II, and four others, one of which died in infancy.

Wallingford died on 6 June 1944 in Auckland.
