= Gustav-Adolf Sjöberg =

Swedish sport shooter

Personal information
- Born: 22 March 1865 Söderfors, Sweden
- Died: 31 October 1937 (aged 72) Köping, Sweden

Sport
- Sport: Sports shooting
Medal record
Men's shooting
Representing Sweden
Olympic Games
Silver medal – second place	1908 London	Team free rifle

Gustav-Adolf Sjöberg (22 March 1865 – 31 October 1937) was a Swedish sport shooter who competed at the 1908 Summer Olympics. In 1908, he was a member of the Swedish team, which won the silver medal in the free rifle team event. He also finished fourth in the 300 metre free rifle competition.
