= Axel Jansson (sport shooter) =

Swedish sport shooter

Personal information
- Born: 24 April 1882 Stockholm, Sweden
- Died: 22 September 1909 (aged 27) Stockholm, Sweden

Sport
- Sport: Sports shooting
Medal record
Men's shooting
Representing Sweden
Olympic Games
Silver medal – second place	1908 London	Team free rifle

Carl Axel Jansson (24 April 1882 – 22 September 1909) was a Swedish sport shooter who competed in the 1908 Summer Olympics. In 1908, he won the silver medal in the team free rifle event. In the team military rifle event he finished fifth and in the 300 metre free rifle competition he finished seventh.
