= Jacob van Moppes =

Dutch wrestler

Personal information
- Nationality: Dutch
- Born: 18 August 1876 Amsterdam, Netherlands
- Died: 26 March 1943 (aged 66) Sobibór, Poland

Sport
- Sport: Wrestling

Jacob van Moppes (18 August 1876 – 26 March 1943) was a Dutch wrestler. He competed in the men's Greco-Roman lightweight at the 1908 Summer Olympics. He was killed in the Sobibor extermination camp during World War II.
