= Janne Gustafsson =

Swedish sport shooter

Personal information
- Born: 2 May 1883 Dalarna, Sweden
- Died: 24 September 1942 (aged 59) Dalarna, Sweden

Sport
- Sport: Sports shooting
Medal record
Men's shooting
Representing Sweden
Olympic Games
| Silver medal – second place | 1908 London | Team free rifle |

Johan "Janne" Gustafsson (2 May 1883 – 24 September 1942) was a Swedish shooter who competed at the 1908 Summer Olympics.

In 1908, he won the silver medal in the team free rifle event. In the 300 metre free rifle competition as well as in the team military rifle event he finished fifth.
