= Arno Saarinen =

Finnish artistic gymnast (1884–1970)

- Saarinen with the 1908 Finland team

Personal information
- Full name: Arno Aleksanteri Saarinen
- Born: 11 September 1884 Ähtäri, Grand Duchy of Finland, Russian Empire
- Died: 7 February 1970 (aged 85)

Gymnastics career
- Discipline: Men's artistic gymnastics
- Country represented: Finland
- Club: Ylioppilasvoimistelijat
Medal record
Men's artistic gymnastics
Representing Finland
Olympic Games
Bronze medal – third place	1908 London	Team

Arno Aleksanteri Saarinen (11 September 1884 – 7 February 1970) was a Finnish gymnast who won bronze in the 1908 Summer Olympics.

== Early life and education ==
Saarinen was born on 11 September 1884 to parents Gustaf Adolf Saarinen and Gustafva Lindborg. He completed his matriculation exam in Vaasa Finnish Real Lyceum in 1903. He graduated as a Master of Science in 1909.

== Gymnastics career ==
Arno Saarinen at the Olympic Games
Games	Event	Rank	Notes
1908 Summer Olympics	Men's team	3rd	Source:

He won the Finnish national championship in team gymnastics as a member of Ylioppilasvoimistelijat in 1909.

== Post-gymnastics career ==
Saarinen worked in various engineering jobs from 1909 to 1915. Then, he was an assistant manager at a SOK production plant from 1916 to 1949. Finally, he became a salesman from 1950–1964.

He completed engineer officer examination in 1928 and reached the rank of captain (eng.).

== Personal life ==
Saarinen married Varma Väiniö in 1928. They had three children:

1. Antti Sakari (1920–)
2. Taru Kirsti Kaarina (1933–)
3. Ilkka Aarnio Kalevi (1935–)
