= Lauri Kolho =

Finnish sports shooter (1886–1940)

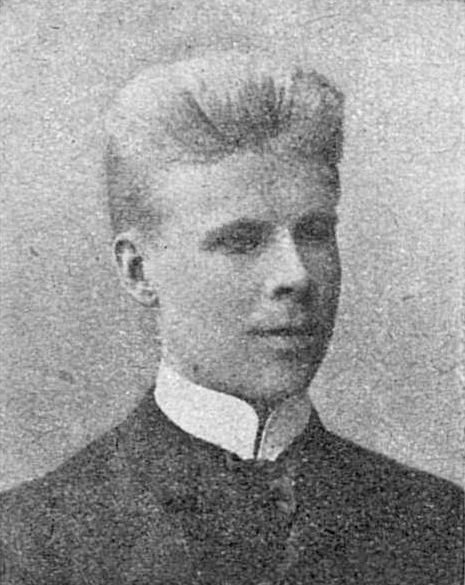

Personal information
- National team: Finland
- Born: Lauri Saxberg; 7 September 1886 Keuruu, Grand Duchy of Finland, Russian Empire
- Died: 17 September 1940 (aged 54) Vilppula, Finland
- Occupation: Farmer
- Spouse: Taimi Helena Ahola

Sport
- Sport: Sports shooting
- Club: Suomen Metsästysyhdistys; Kolhon Ampuma- ja Metsästysseura
- Coached by: Matti Kolho

Lauri Kolho (born Saxberg, 7 September 1886 – 17 September 1940) was a Finnish sports shooter who competed at the 1908 and the 1912 Summer Olympics.

== Shooting ==
Lauri Kolho at the Olympic Games
Games	Event	Rank	Notes
1908 Summer Olympics	300 metre free rifle, three positions	39th	Source:
1912 Summer Olympics	300 metre free rifle, three positions	57th	

Kolho was a board member of the Finnish Shooting Sport Federation in 1922–1923.

== Biography ==
He performed his matriculation exam in the Vaasa Finnish Lycaeum in 1905. He tended his family farm from 1907.

He fought in the Finnish Civil War, acted as the local chief of Kolho White Guard and in the staff of the Northern Häme White Guard District.

He was active in the Lapua Movement and the Patriotic People's Movement.

He died of ileus.

== Family ==
His parents were farmer Abram Evert Kolho and Eulalia Riihimäki. Olympic shooters Voitto and Yrjö Kolho were his brothers, as was architect Vilho Kolho.

Born Saxberg, they finnicized the family name to Kolho on 12 May 1906.

He married home economics teacher Taimi Helena Ahola (1899–1966). They had four children:

- Ulla Onerva (1931–1993), who married the economist Seppo Konttinen.
- Eila Inkeri (1932–)
- Vilma Kaarina (1935–)
- Lauri Arimo (1938–)

== Sources ==
- Siukonen, Markku (2001). Urheilukunniamme puolustajat. Suomen olympiaedustajat 1906–2000. Suuri olympiateos (in Finnish). Jyväskylä: Graface. p. 135. ISBN 951-98673-1-7.
