= Frans Nässling =

Finnish sports shooter

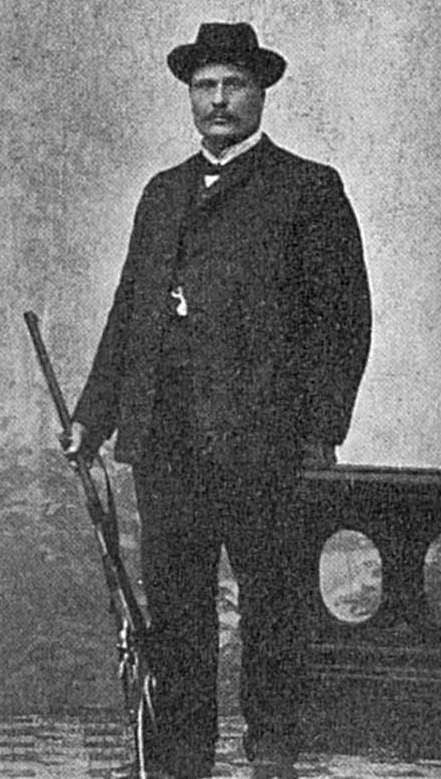

Personal information
- Full name: Frans Reinold Nässling
- National team: Finland
- Born: 23 November 1868; Turku, Grand Duchy of Finland, Russian Empire
- Died: 7 May 1933 (aged 64); Turku, Finland
- Occupation: Postal clerk

Sport
- Sport: Sports shooting, cycling
- Club: Skjutkonstens Vänner i Åbo (shooting)

Frans Reinold Nässling (23 November 1868 – 7 May 1933) was a Finnish sports shooter who competed at the 1908 and 1920 Summer Olympics and won three Finnish national championship golds.

== Shooting ==
=== Olympics ===
Frans Nässling at the Olympic Games
Games	Event	Rank	Notes
1908 Summer Olympics	300 metre free rifle, three positions	30th	Source:
1908 Summer Olympics	Team free rifle	8th	Source:
1920 Summer Olympics	50 metre team free pistol	11th	

=== International ===
Nässling competed at the 1914 ISSF World Shooting Championships, placing 5th in an army rifle event.

=== National ===
He won three Finnish national championship golds in shooting:

- free rifle, standing: 1908
- free rifle, three positions: 1914, 1918

He represented the club Skjutkonstens Vänner i Åbo.

He was at the constituting meeting of the Finnish Shooting Sport Federation.

== Other ==
He broke the Finnish national records of 40 and 80 kilometre cycling in 1895.

He was a gymnast in the club Åbo Turnförening his youth.

He was active in the Turku White Guard.

His family name has also appeared as Näsling. Olympic shooter Emil Nässling was his brother.

== Sources ==
- Siukonen, Markku (2001). Urheilukunniamme puolustajat. Suomen olympiaedustajat 1906–2000. Suuri olympiateos (in Finnish). Jyväskylä: Graface. p. 232. ISBN 951-98673-1-7.
