= Emil Nässling =

Finnish sports shooter (1864–1924)

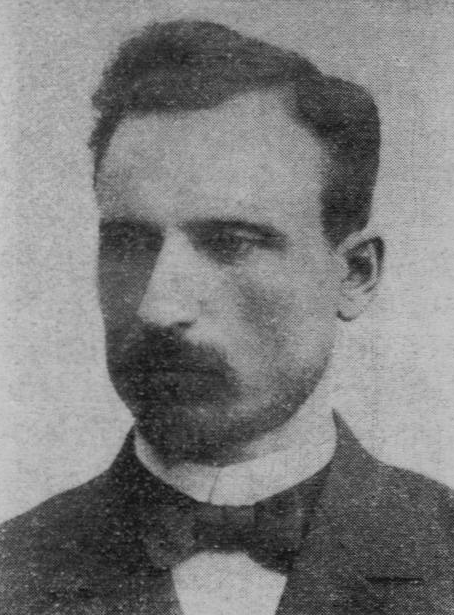

Personal information
- Full name: Emil Michael Nässling
- National team: Finland
- Born: 1 October 1864 Turku, Grand Duchy of Finland, Russian Empire
- Died: 20 May 1924 (aged 59) Turku, Finland
- Occupation(s): Dispatcher, postmaster

Sport
- Sport: Sports shooting, cycling

Emil Michael Nässling (1 October 1864 – 20 May 1924) was a Finnish sports shooter who competed at the 1908 Summer Olympics and won one Finnish national championship gold.

== Shooting ==
=== Olympics ===
Emil Nässling at the Olympic Games
Games	Event	Rank	Notes
1908 Summer Olympics	300 metre free rifle, three positions	41st	Source:
1908 Summer Olympics	Team free rifle	8th	Source:

=== International ===
Nässling competed at the 1914 ISSF World Shooting Championships.

=== National ===
He won Finnish national championship gold in free rifle, three positions, in 1911.

== Other ==
He was among the best cyclists in Finland in the 1890s.

His family name has also appeared as Näsling. Olympic shooter Frans Nässling was his brother.

== Sources ==
- Siukonen, Markku (2001). Urheilukunniamme puolustajat. Suomen olympiaedustajat 1906–2000. Suuri olympiateos (in Finnish). Jyväskylä: Graface. p. 232. ISBN 951-98673-1-7.
