= Heikki Huttunen =

Finnish sport shooter (1880–1947)

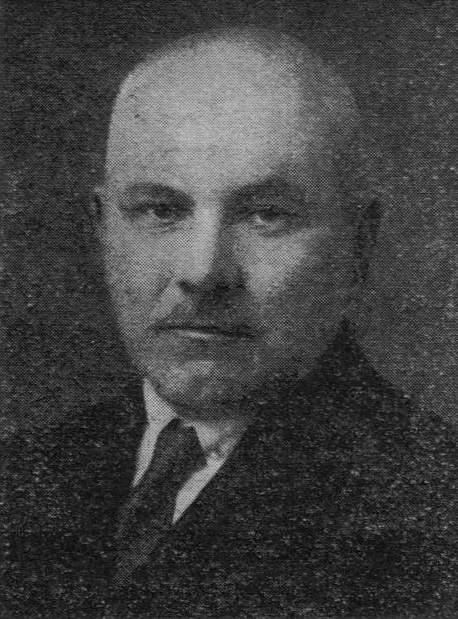

Personal information
- National team: Finland
- Born: 26 September 1880 Piippola, Grand Duchy of Finland, Russian Empire
- Died: 21 September 1947 (aged 66) Helsinki, Finland
- Education: Master of Science (Technology)
- Occupation(s): mechanical engineer, depot manager

Sport
- Sport: Sports shooting, cross-country skiing
- Club: Suomen Metsästysyhdistys (shooting)

Heikki Huttunen (26 September 1880 – 21 September 1947) was a Finnish sport shooter who competed at the 1908, 1912 and 1924 Summer Olympics, and won five Finnish national championship golds.

== Shooting ==
=== Olympics ===
Heikki Hallamaa at the Olympic Games
Games	Event	Rank	Notes
1908 Summer Olympics	300 metre free rifle, three positions	38th	Source:
1908 Summer Olympics	Team free rifle	8th	Source:
1912 Summer Olympics	50 metre pistol	28th	
1912 Summer Olympics	300 metre free rifle, three positions	25th	
1912 Summer Olympics	Team free rifle	5th	
1924 Summer Olympics	50 metre rifle, prone	20th	
1924 Summer Olympics	600 metre free rifle	44th	
1924 Summer Olympics	Team free rifle	5th	

=== International ===
Huttunen competed in the ISSF World Shooting Championships:

- 1914: 5th in free rifle team
- 1924: 7th in free rifle, standing

=== National ===
Huttunen won five Finnish national championship golds:

- free rifle, standing: 1909, 1924
- free rifle, three positions: 1910, 1913
- free pistol: 1919

=== Other ===
He represented the club Suomen Metsästysyhdistys.

He was present at the constitutive meeting of the Finnish Shooting Sport Federation, and became its board member.

He was the sports director of the Kuopio White Guard district in the 1930s.

He received the Silver Medal of Merit with the Golden Cross of the Finnish Sport in 1947.

== Cross-country skiing ==
He competed at the 1901 and 1905 Nordic Games. In 1901, he placed 6th in the 30 kilometre cross-country skiing with time 2:27:29. In 1905, he placed 7th in the same event with time 2:41:55.

He was part of the team that won the first cross-country skiing relay race in Finland, from Helsinki to Porvoo in 1904. He also took part in the organizational activities of skiing in Finland in the 1900s and 1910s.

== Sources ==
- Siukonen, Markku (2001). Urheilukunniamme puolustajat. Suomen olympiaedustajat 1906–2000. Suuri olympiateos (in Finnish). Jyväskylä: Graface. p. 76. ISBN 951-98673-1-7.
