= Heikki Lehmusto =

Finnish gymnast (1884–1958)

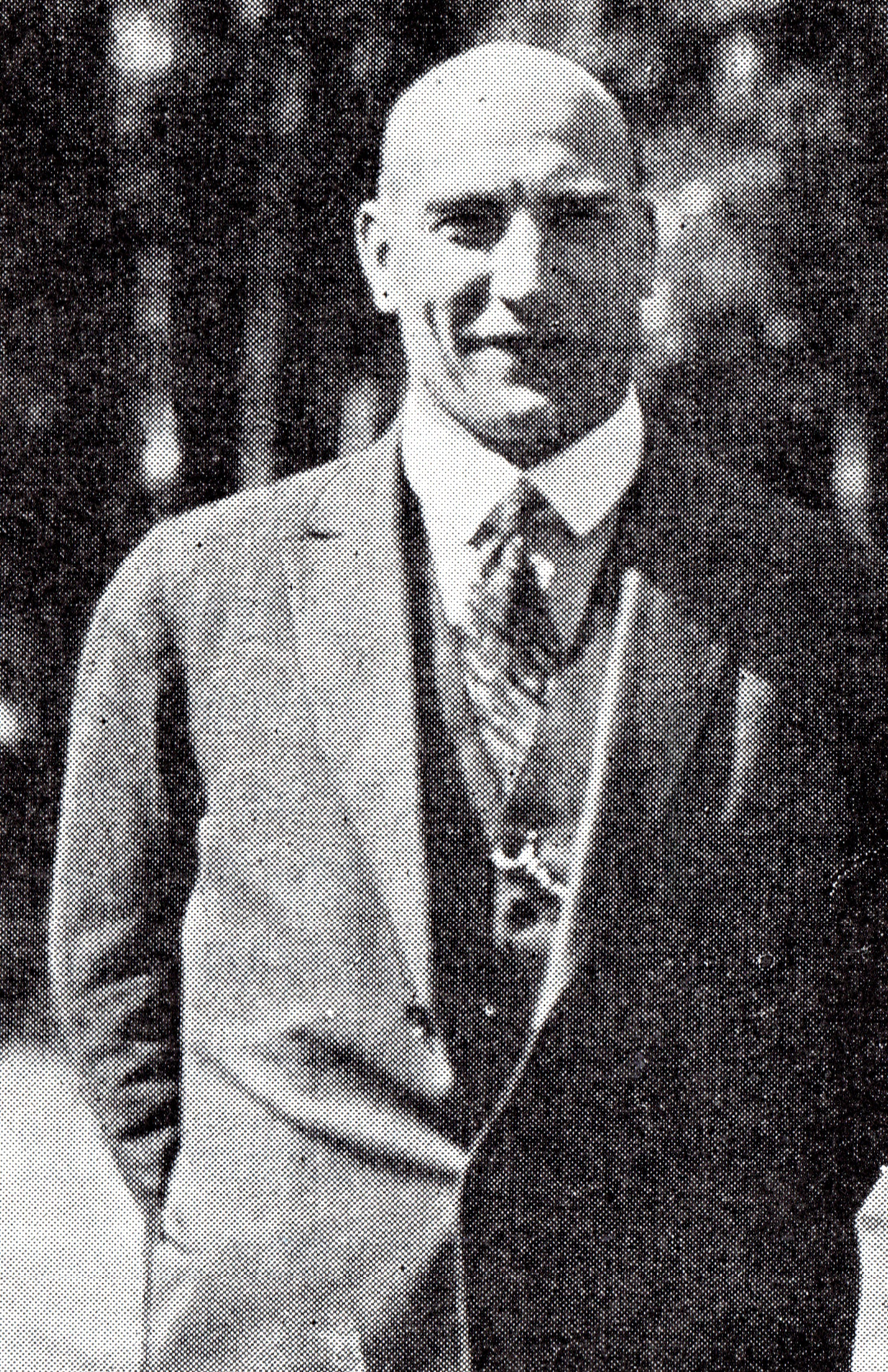
- Lehmusto c. 1936

Personal information
- Full name: Heikki Heikinpoika Lehmusto
- Born: 30 August 1884 Porvoon maalaiskunta, Grand Duchy of Finland, Russian Empire
- Died: 22 September 1958 (aged 74) Turku, Finland

Gymnastics career
- Discipline: Men's artistic gymnastics
- Country represented: Finland
Medal record
Men's artistic gymnastics
Representing Finland
Olympic Games
Bronze medal – third place	1908 London	Team

Heikki Heikinpoika Lehmusto (30 August 1884 – 22 September 1958) was a Finnish artistic gymnast who won a bronze medal at the 1908 Summer Olympics. He later became a sports leader and a sportswriter.

== Early life and education ==
Lehmusto was born on 30 August 1884. His father was Heikki Lindholm (former Uusi-Lampila), and his mother was Kaisa Niesi. He Finnicized his family name from Lindholm to Lehmusto in 1906.

He took his matriculation exam in the Porvoon suomalainen yhteiskoulu in 1906. He submitted his doctoral thesis to the University of Helsinki in 1923. His academic career peaked with an adjunct professorship at the University of Turku. Johan Vilhelm Snellman was his scientific main interest.

== Gymnastics career ==
Wrestling was Lehmusto's main sport, but he won an Olympic medal in gymnastics. Johan Fredrik Blomqvist was his gymnastics teacher at school. He began wrestling competitively in 1904.

He won the Finnish academic heavyweight wrestling championship in 1914 and 1915, which would be his best achievement in the sport as an athlete.

Heikki Lehmusto at the Olympic Games
Games	Event	Rank	Notes
1908 Summer Olympics	Men's team	3rd	Source:

== Post-gymnastics career ==
Lehmusto was the chairman of the Finnish Wrestling Federation in 1932–1936 and 1938–1940, and its predecessor, the wrestling chapter of Finnish Gymnastics and Sports Federation in 1918–1920 and 1925–28.

He was a member of the board of the Finnish Olympic Committee in 1919–1920, 1927–1928 and 1934–1938, and the leader of the Finnish wrestling team at the 1920, 1928 and 1936 Summer Olympics.

He is an honorary chairman of the Finnish Wrestling Federation and an honorary member of the Finnish Gymnastics and Sports Federation and the club Helsingin Atleettiklubi.

He was also an accomplished sportswriter.

== Personal life ==
His first wife until 1928 was Elin Ingeborg Sjöblom, and his second wife from 1929 was Anna Solntsew-Sundström, the daughter of Sergei Solntsev. His only child, Heikki, was born in 1913. He was a passionate fennophile.
