= Aarne Pohjonen =

Finnish artistic gymnast

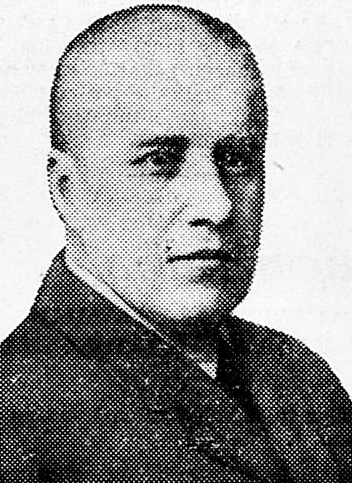
- Pohjonen in 1938

Personal information
- Full name: Aarne Anders Pohjonen
- Born: 29 March 1886 Luhanka, Grand Duchy of Finland, Russian Empire
- Died: 22 December 1938 (aged 52) Vaasa, Finland

Gymnastics career
- Discipline: Men's artistic gymnastics
- Country represented: Finland
- Club: Ylioppilasvoimistelijat
Medal record
Men's artistic gymnastics
Representing Finland
Olympic Games
| Bronze medal – third place | 1908 London | Team |

Aarne Anders Pohjonen (29 March 1886 – 22 December 1938) was a Finnish gymnast who won bronze in the 1908 Summer Olympics.

== Early life and education ==
Pohjonen was born on 29 March 1886 to provost Jaakko Pohjonen and Amanda Maria Taube. He completed his matriculation exam in the Jyväskylä Lyseo in 1904 and graduated as a Licentiate of Medicine from the University of Helsinki in 1914.

== Gymnastics career ==
Aarne Pohjonen at the Olympic Games
| Games | Event | Rank | Notes |
|---|---|---|---|
| 1908 Summer Olympics | Men's team | 3rd | Source: |

He won the Finnish national championship in team gymnastics as a member of Ylioppilasvoimistelijat in 1909.

== Post-gymnastics career ==
Pohjonen started in the public sector as a medical intern and then worked as a physician until 1938. In the military sector, he was a White Guard volunteer in the Finnish Civil War. Then he worked as a medical officer in the Finnish Defence Forces in 1918–1930, reaching the rank of lieutenant colonel (med.). He specialized in tuberculosis.

He sat in the city council of Vaasa in 1933–1938.

He received the following honorary awards:

- Commemorative Medal of the Liberation War
- Cross of Liberty, 4th Class; 1918
- Knight (Chevalier) of the White Rose of Finland, 1923

== Personal life ==
Pohjonen married Tyyne Matilda Riekki in 1925. She was an adoptive sister of Esko Riekki.

Pohjonen died of cancer on 22 December 1938 and was buried at the Vaasa New Cemetery.
