= Fredrik Svanström =

Finnish middle-distance runner

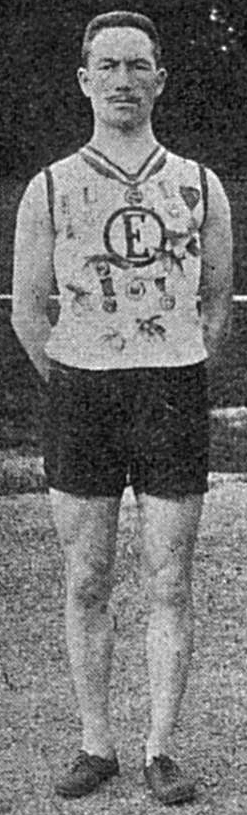
- Fredrik Svanström circa 1908

Personal information
- Full name: Aadolf Fredrik Svanström
- Nickname: Fred
- National team: Finland
- Born: 3 December 1885 Pargas, Grand Duchy of Finland, Russian Empire
- Died: 17 April 1959 (aged 73) Helsinki, Finland
- Education: University of Veterinary Medicine Hanover
- Occupations: Veterinary physician, veterinary colonel
- Spouse: Paula Hakulinen

Sport
- Sport: Track and field
- Event: Middle-distance running
- Club: Helsingin Unitas; Turun Urheiluliitto

Aadolf Fredrik Svanström (3 December 1885 – 17 April 1959) was a Finnish middle-distance runner who competed in the 1908 Summer Olympics in London.

== Athletics ==
=== Olympics ===
Fredrik Svanström at the Olympic Games
Games	Event	Time	Rank	Notes
1908 Summer Olympics	800 metres, heats	Did not finish		Official records say he did not finish, but Finnish records say he placed 5th in heat, with time 2:04.6
1908 Summer Olympics	1500 metres, heats	4:25.2	3rd in heat	Did not advance

=== Other ===
He won the Finnish national championship gold in 1500 metres in 1907.

He broke a few Finnish records in middle-distance running, but only one of them was ratified:

- 1000 metres with the time 2:38.2 in Braunschweig, German Empire, in 1907. However, before 1923, only races in Finland were ratified as national records.
- 1500 metres, 4:22.0, Turku, 1 September 1907. Was ratified.
- Mile, 4:38.8, Stockholm, Sweden, 14 September 1907. Not ratified.
- 1500 metres, 4:19.6, Stockholm, Sweden, 15 September 1907. Not ratified.

He was a German Hochschule track and field champion in 1500 metres in 1907–1909.

== Career ==
He completed his matriculation exam in Turku Swedish Real Lyceum in 1906. He graduated as a veterinary physician from the University of Veterinary Medicine Hanover in 1911.

He was the municipal veterinarian of Pargas from 1911 to 1918 when he was hired by the Finnish Defence Forces.

He made trips to import weapons for the White Guard in 1917–1918 and fought in the Finnish Civil War. He completed the veterinary officer's course in 1918. He was the chief of the remount section under the Ministry of Defence during the Winter War. He was the chief of the veterinary materiel office during the Continuation War.

He retired from the military with the rank of veterinary colonel in 1945 and continued working as a foodstuff hygienist and an official veterinarian for a further 13 years.

=== Accolades ===
He was made an honorary member of the Finnish Veterinary Association in 1951.

He received the following medals:

- Order of the Cross of Liberty, 4th class cross with swords
- First Class Knight of the White Rose of Finland
- Commemorative medal of the Liberation War

== Family ==
His parents were sea captain Gustav Adolf Svanström and Matilda Carolina Hallberg. His wife was Paula Hakulinen.

== Sources ==
- Siukonen, Markku (2001). Urheilukunniamme puolustajat. Suomen olympiaedustajat 1906–2000. Suuri olympiateos (in Finnish). Vol. 12. Jyväskylä: Graface. p. 324. ISBN 951-98673-1-7.
