= Gustaf Nyman =

Finnish sport shooter

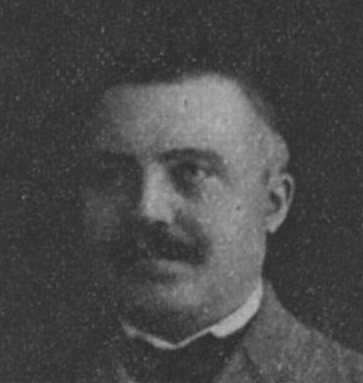

Personal information
- Full name: Gustaf Richard Nyman
- National team: Finland
- Born: 12 October 1874 Nummi, Grand Duchy of Finland, Russian Empire
- Died: 14 May 1952 (aged 77) Helsinki, Finland
- Occupation(s): Blacksmith, sheet metal worker

Sport
- Sport: Sports shooting
Medal record
Shooting
Representing Finland (Russia)
World Championships
Bronze medal – third place	1914 Viborg	300 metre free rifle 40 shots standing

Gustaf Richard Nyman (12 October 1874 – 14 May 1952) was a Finnish sport shooter who competed in the 1908 and the 1912 Summer Olympics, and won a world championship bronze.

Gustav Nyman at the Olympic Games
Games	Event	Rank	Notes
1908 Summer Olympics	300 metre free rifle, three positions	44th	Source:
1908 Summer Olympics	Team free rifle	8th	Source:
1912 Summer Olympics	300 metre free rifle, three positions	19th	
1912 Summer Olympics	Team free rifle	5th	

Nyman won bronze in 300 metre free rifle 40 shots standing event at the 1914 ISSF World Shooting Championships.

His given names have also appeared as Gustav Richard and Kustaa Rikard. He often used the initials G. R. as his first name.

He received his journeyman papers as a plater in 1894.
