= Huvi Tuiskunen =

Finnish sports shooter (1872–1930)

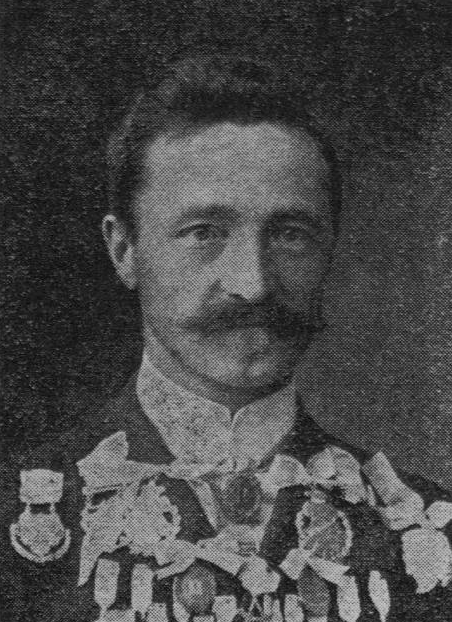

Personal information
- Full name: Huvi Hjalmar Tuiskunen
- National team: Finland
- Born: 22 July 1872 Orimattila, Grand Duchy of Finland, Russian Empire
- Died: 31 March 1930 (aged 57) Lahti, Finland
- Resting place: Mustankallio cemetery, Lahti
- Occupation(s): Merchant, farmer

Sport
- Sport: Sports shooting
- Club: Suomen Metsästysyhdistys

Huvi Hjalmar Tuiskunen (22 July 1872 – 31 March 1930) was a Finnish sport shooter who competed at the 1908 and 1912 Summer Olympics and won a Finnish championship in 1907.

== Shooting ==
Huvi Tuiskunen at the Olympic Games
Games	Event	Rank	Notes
1908 Summer Olympics	300 metre free rifle, three positions	37th	Source:
1908 Summer Olympics	Team free rifle	8th	Source:
1912 Summer Olympics	100 meter running deer, single shots	21st	
1912 Summer Olympics	300 metre free rifle, three positions	39th	
1912 Summer Olympics	Team free rifle	5th	

He received the first Finnish national championship gold in shooting when he won the 300 metre free rifle event in 1907.

He represented the club Suomen Metsästysyhdistys.

He was at the constituting meeting of the Finnish Shooting Sport Federation.

== Personal ==
He was born in Luhtikylä, Orimattila. He moved to a farm in Helsinki in 1898. He moved to open a sports utility shop in Lahti in 1922.

He maintained a link to his family by having a summer villa drawn by Lars Sonck built in Luhtikylä.

He was killed by an accidental discharge of a pistol he was about to clean. He was survived by a wife, a son, and an adopted daughter.

He is buried in the Mustankallio cemetery in Lahti.

He is related to shooters Matti Nummela and Helena Juppala.

== Sources ==
- Huvi Tuiskunen at Olympedia
- Siukonen, Markku (2001). Urheilukunniamme puolustajat. Suomen olympiaedustajat 1906–2000. Suuri olympiateos (in Finnish). Jyväskylä: Graface. p. 341. ISBN 951-98673-1-7.
