= Elis Sipilä =

Finnish artistic gymnast

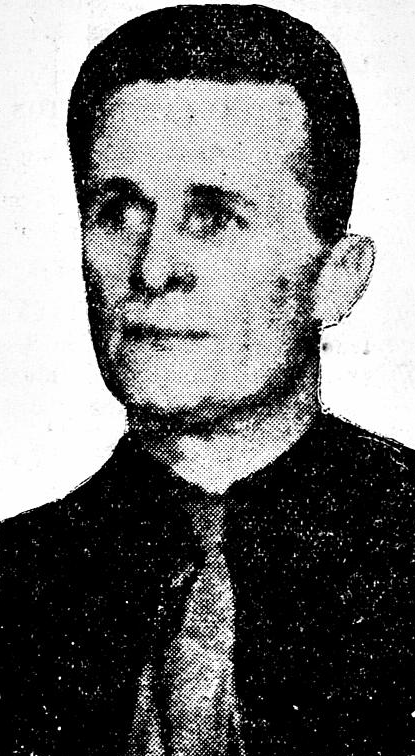
- Sipilä wearing a Patriotic People's Movement party uniform

Personal information
- Full name: Elis Esaias Sipilä
- Born: 2 March 1876 Teuva, Grand Duchy of Finland, Russian Empire
- Died: 13 December 1958 (aged 82) Helsinki, Finland

Gymnastics career
- Discipline: Men's artistic gymnastics
- Country represented: Finland
- Club: Ylioppilasvoimistelijat
Medal record
Men's artistic gymnastics
Representing Finland
Olympic Games
Bronze medal – third place	1908 London	Team

Elis Esaias Sipilä (27 October 1887 – 13 December 1958) was a Finnish gymnast who won bronze in the 1908 Summer Olympics.

== Gymnastics career ==
Elis Sipilä at the Olympic Games
Games	Event	Rank	Notes
1908 Summer Olympics	Men's team	3rd	Source:

He won the Finnish national championship in team gymnastics as a member of Ylioppilasvoimistelijat in 1909.

== Personal life ==
He shot a man apparently to cover up a fraud in Vaasa on 2 March 1934. He was convicted to 12 years in prison for manslaughter and embezzlement.

== Sources ==
- Siukonen, Markku (2001). Urheilukunniamme puolustajat. Suomen olympiaedustajat 1906–2000. Suuri olympiateos (in Finnish). Jyväskylä: Graface. p. 309. ISBN 951-98673-1-7.
