= Iivari Kyykoski =

Finnish gymnast

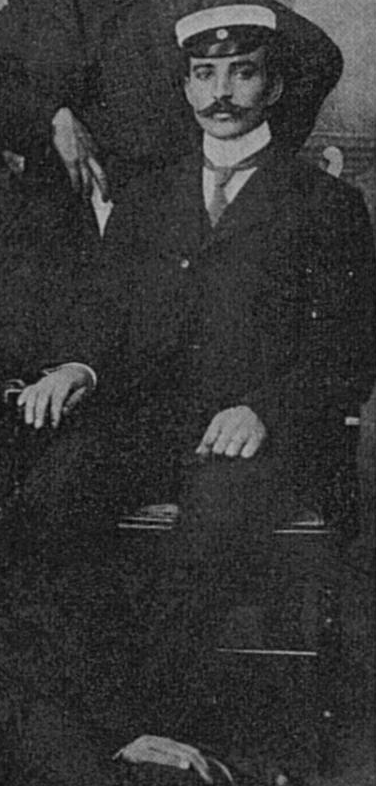
- Kyykoski in 1905

Personal information
- Full name: Pentti Iivari Kyykoski
- Alternative name: Bert Ivar Nordlund
- Born: 16 February 1881 Luvia, Grand Duchy of Finland, Russian Empire
- Died: 8 December 1959 (aged 78) Helsinki, Finland

Gymnastics career
- Discipline: Men's artistic gymnastics
- Country represented: Finland
- Club: Ylioppilasvoimistelijat
Medal record
Men's artistic gymnastics
Representing Finland
Olympic Games
Bronze medal – third place	1908 London	Team

Pentti Iivari Kyykoski (born Bert Ivar Nordlund, 16 February 1881 – 8 December 1959) was a Finnish gymnast who won bronze in the 1908 Summer Olympics.

== Early life and education ==
Kyykoski was born Bert Ivar Nordlund on 16 February 1881 to tax collector Lars Victor Nordlund and Amanda Gustava Starck. He completed his matriculation exam in Porin Lyseo in 1900 and graduated as a Master of Science from the Helsinki University of Technology in 1909. He Finnicized his name from Nordlund to Kyykoski in 1906.

== Gymnastics career ==
Kyykoski won the Nordic students' coxed four rowing championship in the club Akateeminen Urheiluseura in 1905.

Iivari Kyykoski at the Olympic Games
Games	Event	Rank	Notes
1908 Summer Olympics	Men's team	3rd	Source:

He won the Finnish national championship in team gymnastics as a member of Ylioppilasvoimistelijat in 1909.

== Post-gymnastics career ==
He worked as a technical director and a chief executive officer in various factories in the private sector in 1910–1922. He entered the military sector in 1923 as a technical inspector at the Ministry of Defense ordnance department. He completed the engineer officer examination in 1926, reaching the rank of lieutenant colonel engineer in 1933. He eventually retired from the Defence Command in 1949.

He also held various municipal positions of trust.

He was issued orders and medals:

- Cross of Liberty, 3rd Class
- Commemorative Medal of the Winter War
- The commemorative medal of the old Finnish army

== Personal life ==
Kyykoski married Ida Maria Ylönen in 1908. He had two children, Pentti Kalervo (1911–) and Aune-Marjatta (1913–).
