= Karl Reilin =

Finnish sports shooter (1874–1962)

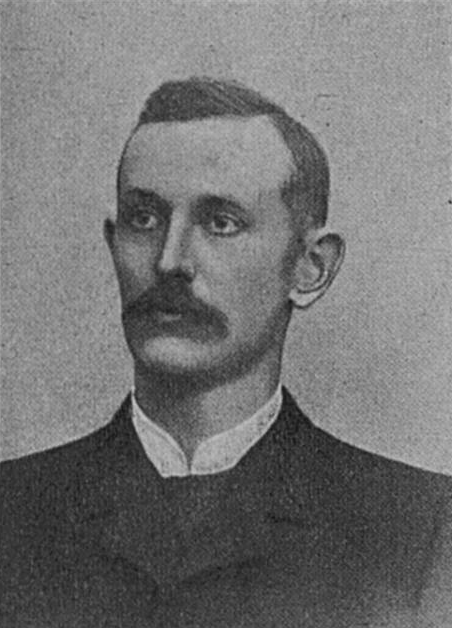

Personal information
- Full name: Karl Henrik Lorentz Reilin
- National team: Finland
- Born: 16 March 1874 Ulvila, Grand Duchy of Finland, Russian Empire
- Died: 18 January 1962 (aged 87) Helsinki, Finland
- Occupation(s): Mechanical engineer, railway official, railroad engineer, locomotive fireman, filer
- Spouse: Maria Luoma

Sport
- Sport: Sports shooting

Karl Henrik Lorentz Reilin (16 March 1874 – 18 January 1962) was a Finnish sports shooter, who competed at the 1908 and the 1912 Summer Olympics.

Karl Reilin at the Olympic Games
Games	Event	Rank	Notes
1908 Summer Olympics	300 metre free rifle, three positions	45th	Source:
1912 Summer Olympics	100 meter running deer, single shots	27th	

He placed fifth at 300 metre rifle, 3 positions team event at the 1914 ISSF World Shooting Championships.

He and Maria Luoma were the parents of Sirkka Elisabeth (1932–), who married Jaakko Tähtinen.

== Sources ==
- Siukonen, Markku (2001). Urheilukunniamme puolustajat. Suomen olympiaedustajat 1906–2000. Suuri olympiateos (in Finnish). Jyväskylä: Graface. p. 272. ISBN 951-98673-1-7.
