= Kalle Kustaa Paasia =

Finnish artistic gymnast

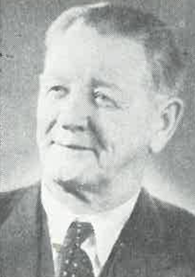
- Paasia, unknown date

Personal information
- Full name: Kaarlo Kustaa Paasia
- Born: 28 August 1883 Sääksmäki, Grand Duchy of Finland, Russian Empire
- Died: 19 December 1961 (aged 78) Naantali, Finland

Gymnastics career
- Discipline: Men's artistic gymnastics
- Country represented: Finland
- Club: Ylioppilasvoimistelijat
Medal record
Men's artistic gymnastics
Representing Finland
Olympic Games
| Bronze medal – third place | 1908 London | Team |

Kaarlo "Kalle" Kustaa Paasia (28 August 1883 – 19 December 1961) was a Finnish gymnast who won bronze in the 1908 Summer Olympics.

== Early life and education ==
Paasia was born on 28 August 1883 to farmer Kalle Kustaa Paasia and Amanda Kustaantytär. He completed his matriculation exam at the Hämeenlinna Lyceum in 1905 and graduated as an agronomist in 1911.

== Gymnastics career ==
Kalle Kustaa Paasia at the Olympic Games
| Games | Event | Rank | Notes |
|---|---|---|---|
| 1908 Summer Olympics | Men's team | 3rd | Source: |

He won the Finnish national championship in team gymnastics as a member of Ylioppilasvoimistelijat in 1909.

== Post-gymnastics career ==
Paasia worked as a chief executive officer of Toijala dairy, principal and teacher of Päivölä farm school, an assistant at the state butter inspection plant in Hanko, and a manager at the butter inspection plant in Turku.

== Personal life ==
Paasia was married twice:

1. Edit Erika Kalalahti (1917)
2. Helmi Elisabet Kivekäs (1922)
