= John Lindroth (gymnast) =

Finnish artistic gymnast

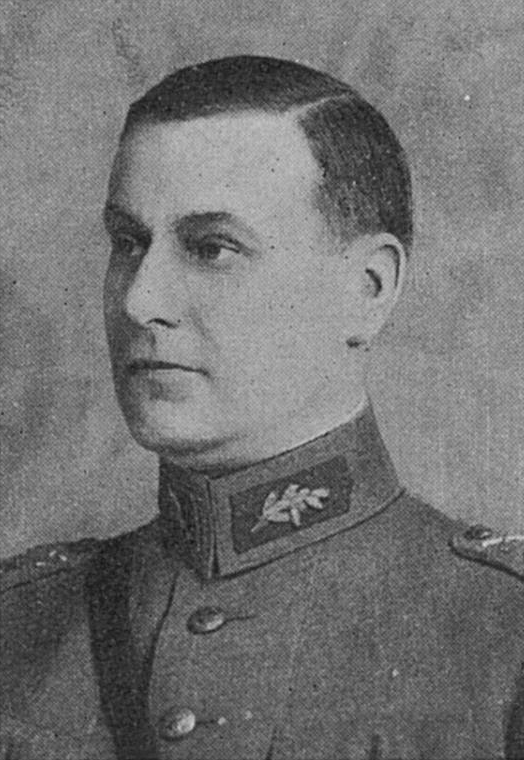
- John Lindroth circa 1933

Personal information
- Full name: Johan Hjalmar Lindroth
- Born: 17 September 1883 Karijoki, Grand Duchy of Finland, Russian Empire
- Died: 24 July 1960 (aged 76) Helsinki, Finland

Gymnastics career
- Discipline: Men's artistic gymnastics
- Country represented: Finland
- Club: Ylioppilasvoimistelijat
Medal record
Men's artistic gymnastics
Representing Finland
Olympic Games
Bronze medal – third place	1908 London	Team

Johan Hjalmar "John" Lindroth (17 September 1883 – 24 July 1960) was a Finnish gymnast who won bronze in the 1908 Summer Olympics.

== Early life and education ==
Lindroth was born on 17 September 1883 to farmer Hugo Gustaf Lindroth and Maria Elisabeth Hannula. He took his matriculation exam in Porin Lyseo in 1904, graduated as a Licentiate of Medicine in 1922, and specialized in internal medicine in 1929.

== Gymnastics career ==
Lindroth represented the club Ylioppilasvoimistelijat in gymnastics and Ylioppilasampujat in sports shooting.

John Lindroth at the Olympic Games
Games	Event	Rank	Notes
1908 Summer Olympics	Men's team	3rd	Source:

== Post-gymnastics career ==
Lindroth worked as the municipal doctor of Vantaa between 1917–1924. He opened a private practice in Helsinki in 1924. He also worked at the Helsinki general hospital and in the military, reaching the rank of major in 1942.

He was a board member of the Finnish Shooting Sport Federation in 1927–.

He was a resistance activist during the Russification of Finland, being a founder of Voimaliitto. He received the Cross of Liberty, 4th class in 1940 and 3rd class in 1942.

== Personal life ==
Lindroth had three marriages: in 1909 to singer Anna Emilia Paulina Fritsch (1887–1921), in 1922 to Gudrun Lindskog (1902–), whom he divorced in 1944, and in 1951 to artist Sophie Isabella Adele Lave (1918–). He had five children: Maire (1916–), Margaretha (1921–), Marjatta (1925–), Mielikki Elisabeth (1928–), and John Gustav (1952–).

Lindroth died on 24 July 1960 and is buried in the Hietaniemi Cemetery in Helsinki.
