= Bruno Zilliacus =

Finnish athletics competitor

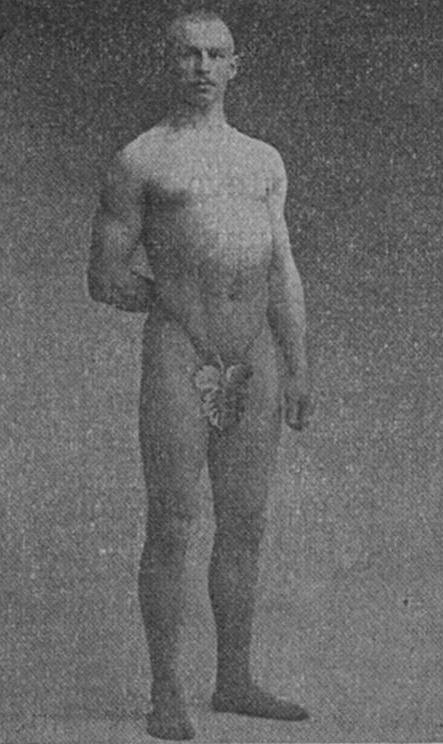
- Bruno Zilliacus as a beauty pageant winner in 1903

Personal information
- Full name: Bruno Wilhelm Zilliacus
- Born: 11 November 1877 Saint Petersburg, Russian Empire
- Died: 3 July 1926 (aged 48) Helsinki, Finland
- Resting place: Sortavala
- Education: Physical education teacher, University of Helsinki, 1902
- Occupations: Teacher, physiotherapist
- Spouse: Meri Starck

Sport
- Sport: Track and field, cross-country skiing
- Event: Shot put
- Club: Sortavalan Seminaarin Voimisteluseura; Ylioppilasvoimistelijat

Bruno Wilhelm Zilliacus (11 November 1877 – 3 July 1926) was a Finnish athlete who competed at the 1908 Summer Olympics.

== Sports ==
Bruno Zilliacus at the Olympic Games
| Games | Event | Rank | Result | Notes |
|---|---|---|---|---|
| 1908 Summer Olympics | Shot put | 9th–25th | unknown | Source: |

He was also listed as a flag-bearer for Finland at the opening ceremony, although he carried a mere hand-written plaque.

Zilliacus participated in the 30-kilometer cross-country skiing race at the Northern Games in Stockholm 1901, where he did not place in the top 11.

Zilliacus won the first beauty pageant in Finland, held in Helsinki on 8 March 1903.

He represented the clubs Sortavalan Seminaarin Voimisteluseura (Sortavala) and Ylioppilasvoimistelijat (Helsinki).

== Other ==
Born in Saint Petersburg in 1877, his parents were Major Alexander Wilhelm Zilliacus and Sofia Vilhelmiina Manninen. He married Meri Naëmi Starck (1886–1974) in 1913, daughter of Werner Starck and Naëmi Ingman-Starck. They had three children: Margareta in 1914, Ulla in 1919 and Katarina in 1921. Ulla married Kaarlo af Heurlin in 1941.

He graduated as a physical education teacher from the University of Helsinki in 1902. He worked as a teacher in 1903–1926.

Zilliacus was the local chief of the Sortavala White Guard. He fought on the Karelian front in the Finnish Civil War. He received the Cross of Liberty, 4th class. He reached the rank of vänrikki, the lowest officer rank.

Zilliacus died of stomach cancer at Mehiläinen Hospital in Helsinki in 1926. He was buried in Sortavala.
