= Viktor Smeds =

Finnish sportsman

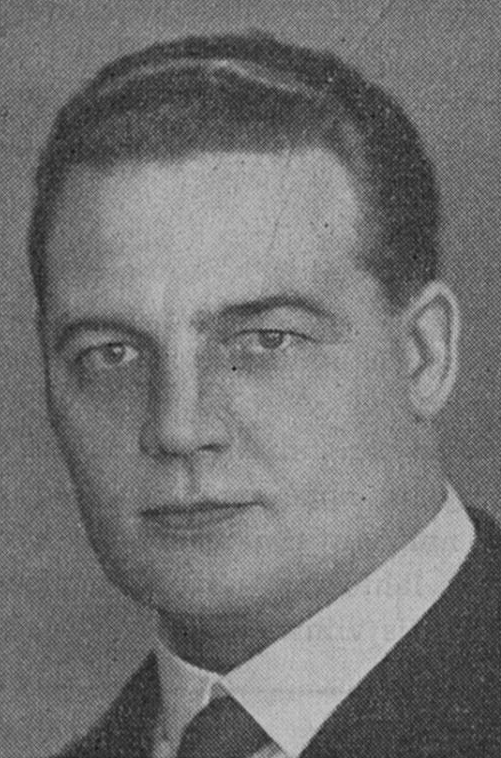
- Smeds in 1935

Personal information
- Full name: Viktor Reinhold Smeds
- Born: 18 September 1885 Petolahti, Grand Duchy of Finland, Russian Empire
- Died: 22 February 1957 (aged 71) Helsinki, Finland

Gymnastics career
- Discipline: Men's artistic gymnastics
- Country represented: Finland
Medal record
Men's artistic gymnastics
Representing Finland
Olympic Games
Bronze medal – third place	1908 London	Team

Viktor Reinhold Smeds (18 September 1885 – 22 February 1957) was a Finnish sportsleader and a boxer, who also won an Olympic bronze in gymnastics.

== Early life and education ==
Smeds was born on 18 September 1885 to farmer Johan Erik Smeds and Lovisa Båsk. Smeds completed his matriculation exam in Vaasa Swedish Lycaeum in 1904, and graduated as a filosofian kandidaatti (roughly Master of Arts) from the University of Helsinki in 1907.

== Sports career ==
Smeds was one of the most significant and internationally best-known sports leaders of his generation in Finland. His impact was especially pivotal in boxing. He also developed strength sports and wrestling, and won an Olympic medal in gymnastics.

=== Olympics ===
Viktor Smeds at the Olympic Games
Games	Sport	Event	Rank	Notes
1908 Summer Olympics	Gymnastics	Men's team	3rd	Source:
1924 Summer Olympics	Boxing	Light heavyweight	Did not start	Source:

He was the leader of the Finnish Olympic boxing team in 1932 and 1936.

He was a wrestling judge at the 1920, 1924 and 1928 games, and a jury chairman in 1936 and 1948. He was a boxing judge at the 1928 and 1932 games and a jury chairman in 1948. He oversaw the boxing events at the 1952 games.

He sat in the board of the Finnish Olympic Committee in 1932–1953.

=== Other sport ===
He represented Finland in Nordic students' rowing competition twice. His team placed 3rd in 1907, and 1st in 1908.

He won the Finnish championship in boxing in light heavyweight in 1923 and heavyweight in 1925. He also wrote some boxing-related guides.

He also played football and tennis.

Club memberships:

- Lovisa Tor, founder and chairman
- Helsingin Nyrkkeilyseura, founder and chairman
- Helsingin Atleettiklubi, chairman

=== Sports leader ===
International:

- International Federation of Associated Wrestling Styles, president in 1929–1952, honorary president
- International Federation of Amateur Boxers / Amateur International Boxing Association, vice president in 1938–1950
- Associazione Pugilistica Professionistica Europea, board member

He founded the Finnish Boxing Federation in 1923. He was the president of the federation until his death, except for one year-long break.

He also was the chairman of the wrestling chapter of Finnish Gymnastics and Sports Federation in 1921–1922.

== Personal life ==
Smeds moved to Loviisa to teach Russian, gymnastics, and physical education in 1909. He was also the local police chief. He was a businessman in various companies first in Saint Petersburg in 1916–1918 and then in Helsinki from 1918. He started his own business in 1940.

Smeds was a recruiter for the Finnish volunteers in the Waffen-SS. He also interrogated Soviet prisoners of war in Finland. He left for Sweden in Operation Stella Polaris but soon returned to Finland. He spoke about twelve languages.

Smeds married Aina Maria Niska, sister of Algoth Niska, in 1910. They had two children, Tove Maria (born 1912) and Björn Smeds (1915–1952). His second wife was Helena Somow, married 1927. His third wife was Greta Carlson, married 1952.

Smeds died on 22 February 1957 and was buried at the Hietaniemi Cemetery.

== Awards and honors ==
He received the following official decorations:

- Finnish state decorations:
  - Medal of Liberty, 1st Class
  - Commander of the Order of the Lion of Finland
  - Commemorative medal of the Winter War
- foreign national orders:
  - Commander of the Order of Vasa (Sweden)
  - Knight of the Legion of Honour (France)
  - Fourth Class of the Order of the White Star (Estonia)
- awards of sports:
  - Grand Cross of Merit of Finnish physical education and sports
  - Cross of Merit, 1st Class, of the Finnish Olympic Games 1952
  - German Olympic Decoration, 1st Class
  - Medaille d'honneur de l'Education Physique (France)
