= Carl Carlsen =

Danish wrestler (1880–1958)

Personal information
- Nationality: Danish
- Born: 1 July 1880 Copenhagen, Denmark
- Died: 19 May 1958 (aged 77) Copenhagen, Denmark

Sport
- Sport: Wrestling

Carl Carlsen (1 July 1880 – 19 May 1958) was a Danish wrestler. He competed in the men's Greco-Roman lightweight at the 1908 Summer Olympics. He also competed at the 1906 Intercalated Games, winning a silver medal.
