= Gunnar Persson (wrestler) =

Swedish wrestler

- Born: 31 December 1889; Simrishamn, Sweden
- Died: 21 December 1972 (aged 82); Limhamn, Sweden

Gunnar Hilding Persson (31 December 1884 - 21 December 1972) was a Swedish wrestler who, at the 1908 Summer Olympics, competed for Sweden in the Greco-Roman lightweight, finishing in fourth place.
