= Heikki Hallamaa =

Finnish sports shooter (1867–1951)

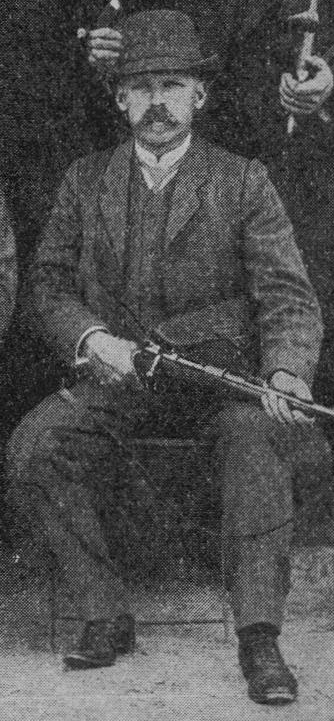
- Hallamaa in 1908

Personal information
- Full name: Hugo Pietari Hallamaa
- Nickname: Heikki
- National team: Finland
- Born: Hugo Pietari Häyrén; 7 October 1867 Käkisalmi, Grand Duchy of Finland, Russian Empire
- Died: 1 March 1951 (aged 83) Helsinki, Finland
- Occupation(s): Athlete, businessman
- Spouse: Amanda Karolina Törnström

Sport
- Sport: Sports shooting

Hugo Pietari "Heikki" Hallamaa (born Häyrén, 7 October 1867 – 1 March 1951) was a Finnish sports shooter who competed at the 1908 Summer Olympics.

== Olympics ==
Heikki Hallamaa at the Olympic Games
Games	Event	Rank	Notes
1908 Summer Olympics	300 metre free rifle, three positions	46th	Source:

== Personal ==
Born in Häyrén, he Finnicized his family name to Hallamaa on 23 June 1906.

He and Amanda Karolina Törnström had at least two children:

- Rakel Jalas, a member of the parliament.
- Rafael Hallamaa, businessman, who was the father of the ceramist Liisa Hallamaa.

He was a businessman in Helsinki.

== Sources ==
- Siukonen, Markku (2001). Urheilukunniamme puolustajat. Suomen olympiaedustajat 1906–2000. Suuri olympiateos (in Finnish). Jyväskylä: Graface. p. 48. ISBN 951-98673-1-7.
