= Nikolay Orlov (wrestler) =

Russian wrestler

Medal record

Men's Greco-Roman wrestling

Representing the Russian Empire

Olympic Games
Silver medal – second place	1908 London	Lightweight

Nikolay Orlov (Russian: Николай Орлов) was a Russian wrestler who competed in the 1908 Summer Olympics.
