= Johan Kemp =

Finnish gymnast

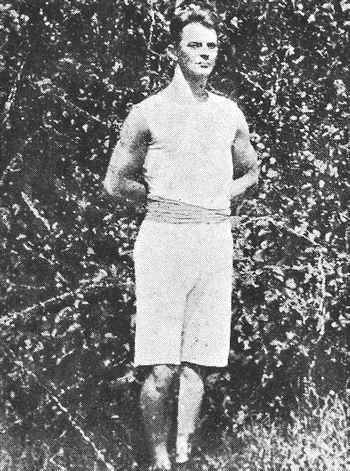
- Kemp in the early 1900s

Personal information
- Full name: Johan Valdemar Kemppainen
- Born: 1 July 1881 Helsinki, Grand Duchy of Finland, Russian Empire
- Died: 20 October 1941 (aged 60) Lahti, Finland

Gymnastics career
- Discipline: Men's artistic gymnastics
- Country represented: Finland
- Club: Helsingfors Gymnastikklubb
Medal record
Men's artistic gymnastics
Representing Finland
Olympic Games
Bronze medal – third place	1908 London	Team

Johan Valdemar Kemppainen (1 July 1881 – 20 October 1941) was a Finnish athlete who won bronze in the 1908 Summer Olympics.

== Early life and education ==
Kemp was born on 1 July 1881 to coachman Juha Juhanpoika Kemppainen and Edla Gustava Helenius. Kemp performed his matriculation exam in the Kotka Swedish Co-educational School in 1904.

== Gymnastics career ==
Kemp took part in two different sports in the Olympics.

Johan Kemp at the Olympic Games
Games	Sport	Event	Rank	Result	Notes
1908 Summer Olympics	Gymnastics	Team	3rd	405 points	Source:
1908 Summer Olympics	Athletics	Freestyle javelin throw	10th–33rd	unknown	Source:
1908 Summer Olympics	Athletics	Shot put	Did not start		
1908 Summer Olympics	Athletics	Discus throw	Did not start		
1908 Summer Olympics	Athletics	Greek discus throw	Did not start		

== Post-gymnastics career ==
Kemp started his career in banking in 1906. He became a bank manager in Helsingin Osakepankki in Lahti in 1919.

Kemp was a resistance activist during the period of Russification of Finland, although he estimated his role as minor. He was a founding member of the Lahti White Guard in August 1917 and joined the White Guard district staff in December. He took part in the Mommila skirmish as a leader in November 1917. He spent the Finnish Civil War obtaining rifles and ammunition and serving as an aide-de-camp and a chief of staff to various commanding officers.

Kemp was an independent member of the Lahti city council in 1930–1931.

He was the commodore of the sailing club Lahden Purjehdusseura for over ten years.

== Personal life ==
Kemp married Helmi Maria Markkanen in 1910. They had four daughters, Margareta Maria, Vava Elisabet, Inga Maija, and Asta Britta. The couple divorced in 1919. Kemp later married Ruth Elna Alanco in 1922, with whom he had no children.

Kemp remained in the local White Guard leadership up to his death. He was awarded the Medal of Merit of the Frontman's Union of Liberation War. He died of a cardiac arrest. He is buried at the Old Cemetery in Lahti.
