= Uno Railo =

Finnish sprinter (1887–1934)

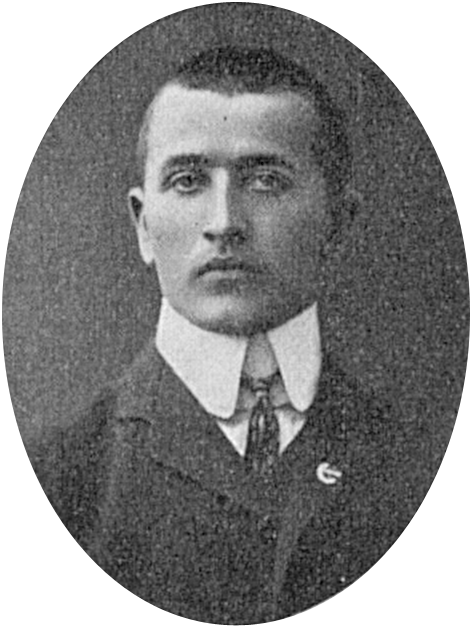

Personal information
- Full name: Uno August Railo
- Citizenship: Finland; United States
- Born: Uno August Rosenberg; January 5, 1887 Tampere, Grand Duchy of Finland, Russian Empire
- Died: November 10, 1934 (aged 47) Berkeley, California, United States
- Occupation(s): Maintenance man, merchant, master builder

Sport
- Sport: Track and field
- Event: Sprint
- Club: Tampereen Pyrintö

Achievements and titles
- Personal bests: 100 m: 10.8 s; 150 m: 17.4 s; 220 yd: 22.6 s; 400 m: 53.2 s; long jump: 716 cm

Uno August "Uuno" Railo (born Rosenberg, 5 January 1887 – 10 November 1934) was a Finnish sprinter.

== Athletics ==
Railo was one of the most talented Finnish track and field athletes of his generation.

He entered to compete in five events at the 1908 Summer Olympics: 100 metres, 200 metres, 400 metres, long jump and triple jump. He couldn't start due to a muscle strain.

He won four Finnish national championship golds in track and field athletics:

- 100 metres in 1907 and 1909
- 400 metres in 1909
- combined standing and running long jump in 1907

He represented the club Tampereen Pyrintö and was its board member in 1908–1909.

=== Records ===
He posted two world leading results of the year:

- 100 metres, 10.8 seconds; in Tampere, Finland; 1907
- long jump, 716 centimetres; Waugekan, Illinois, United States; 1911

He broke four Finnish national records:

- long jump, 649 centimetres, in Tampere on 3 July 1907
- 100 metres, 11.0 and 10.8 seconds, both in Tampere on 4 August 1907. The latter stood for 28 years.
- 200 metres, 23.4 seconds, in Tampere on 5 September 1909

He also clocked 100 metres in 10.6 seconds in 1907, but this result was considered unreliable.

== Biography ==
He finnicized his family name from Rosenberg to Railo on 12 May 1906.

He moved to the United States in 1910. He lived in Waukegan, Illinois and worked as a millwright at a wire mill. He died in an accident on a fishing trip.
