= Netherlands at the 1908 Summer Olympics =

- Flag of the Netherlands
- IOC code: NED

in London
- Competitors: 113 in 11 sports
- Flag bearer: Jan de Boer
- Medals Ranked 17th: Gold 0 Silver 0 Bronze 2 Total 2

Summer Olympics appearances (overview)
- 1900; 1904; 1908; 1912; 1920; 1924; 1928; 1932; 1936; 1948; 1952; 1956; 1960; 1964; 1968; 1972; 1976; 1980; 1984; 1988; 1992; 1996; 2000; 2004; 2008; 2012; 2016; 2020; 2024

Other related appearances
- 1906 Intercalated Games

Athletes from the Netherlands competed at the 1908 Summer Olympics in London, United Kingdom.

== Medalists ==
Medal	Name	Sport	Event	Date
Bronze	Netherlands national football team: Reinier Beeuwkes; Frans de Bruyn Kops; Bok de Korver; Vic Gonsalves; Karel Heijting; John Heijting; Jan Kok; Lo La Chapelle; Miel Mundt; Louis Otten; Jops Reeman; Edu Snethlage; Ed Sol; Jan Thomée; Jan van den Berg; Toine van Renterghem; Caius Welcker	Football		October 24
Bronze	Johan Burk, Bernardus Croon, Hermannus Höfte, Albertus Wielsma	Rowing	Men's coxless four	July 31

== Results by event ==
=== Athletics ===
Event	Place	Athlete	Heats	Semifinals	Final
Men's 100 metres	Heats	Victor Henny	Unknown; 3rd, heat 1	Did not advance	
Men's 100 metres	Heats	Jacobus Hoogveld	Unknown; 3rd, heat 9	Did not advance	
Men's 100 metres	Heats	Evert Koops	Unknown; 4th, heat 3	Did not advance	
Men's 100 metres	Heats	Ernestus Greven	Unknown; 4-5, heat 4	Did not advance	
Men's 200 metres	Heats	Victor Henny	Unknown; 2nd, heat 1	Did not advance	
Men's 200 metres	Heats	Henk van der Wal	Unknown; 3rd, heat 2	Did not advance	
Men's 200 metres	Heats	Ernestus Greven	Unknown; 3rd, heat 6	Did not advance	
Men's 200 metres	Heats	Jacobus Hoogveld	Unknown; 3rd, heat 15	Did not advance	
Men's 200 metres	Heats	Evert Koops	Unknown; 4th, heat 3	Did not advance	
Men's 200 metres	Heats	Cornelis den Held	Unknown; 4th, heat 12	Did not advance	
Men's 400 metres	Heats	Cornelis den Held	Unknown; 2nd, heat 12	Did not advance	
Men's 400 metres	Heats	Jacobus Hoogveld	Unknown; 2nd, heat 16	Did not advance	
Men's 400 metres	Heats	Bram Evers	Unknown; 3rd, heat 15	Did not advance	
Men's 400 metres	Heats	Victor Henny	Unknown; 4th, heat 7	Did not advance	
Men's 400 metres	Heats	Henk van der Wal	Unknown; 4th, heat 14	Did not advance	
Men's 800 metres	Semi- finalist	Arie Vosbergen	None held	Unknown; 4th, semifinal 6	Did not advance
Men's 800 metres	Semi- finalist	Henk van der Wal	None held	Unknown; 6th, semifinal 1	Did not advance
Men's 800 metres	Semi- finalist	Bram Evers	None held	Unknown; 6th, semifinal 7	Did not advance
Men's 1500 metres	Semi- finalist	Arie Vosbergen	None held	Unknown; 3rd, semifinal 6	Did not advance
Men's 1500 metres	Semi- finalist	Jacques Keyser	None held	Unknown; 9th, semifinal 1	Did not advance
Men's 400 metre hurdles	Semi- finalist	Evert Koops	Walkover; 1st, heat 1	Did not finish —, semifinal 1	Did not advance
Men's medley relay	Semi- finalist	Evert Koops; Jacobus Hoogveld; Victor Henny; Bram Evers	None held	Unknown; 2nd, semifinal 2	Did not advance
Men's 3 mile team race	—	Ary Vosbergen	None held	17:15.8; 7 points, team=X	Did not advance
Men's 3 mile team race	—	Willem Wakker	None held	17:46.4; 8 points, team=X	Did not advance
Men's 3 mile team race	—	Wilhelmus Braams	None held	Did not finish No score, team=X	Did not advance
Men's 5 miles	—	Willem Wakker	None held	Did not finish —, semifinal 2	Did not advance
Men's 5 miles	—	Wilhelmus Braams	None held	Did not finish —, semifinal 3	Did not advance
Men's 5 miles	—	Jacques Keyser	None held	Did not finish —, semifinal 4	Did not advance
Men's 5 miles	—	Arie Vosbergen	None held	Did not finish —, semifinal 5	Did not advance
Men's marathon	20th	Willem Wakker	None held		3:28:49.0
Men's marathon	—	Wilhelmus Braams	None held		Did not finish
Men's marathon	—	George Buff	None held		Did not finish
Men's marathon	—	Arie Vosbergen	None held		Did not finish
Men's marathon	—	W. F. Theunissen	None held		Did not start
Men's 3500 metre walk	16th	Jo Goetzee	None held	17:37.8; 7th, semifinal 1	Did not advance
Men's 3500 metre walk	16th	Johan Huijgen	None held	17:37.8; 7th, semifinal 3	Did not advance
Men's 3500 metre walk	18th	Willem Winkelman	None held	17:57.6; 4th, semifinal 2	Did not advance
Men's 3500 metre walk	20th	Petrus Ruimers	None held	18:44.6; 6th, semifinal 2	Did not advance
Men's 10 mile walk	14th	Petrus Ruimers	None held	1:27:38.8	Did not advance
Men's 10 mile walk	—	Jo Goetzee	None held	Did not finish —, semifinal 1	Did not advance
Men's 10 mile walk	—	Piet Soudyn	None held	Did not finish —, semifinal 1	Did not advance
Men's 10 mile walk	—	Willem Winkelman	None held	Did not finish —, semifinal 1	Did not advance
Men's 10 mile walk	—	Johan Huijgen	None held	Did not finish —, semifinal 2	Did not advance

Event	Place	Athlete	Height/ Distance
Men's long jump	21-32	Bram Evers	Unknown
Men's long jump	21-32	Jacobus Hoogveld	Unknown
Men's high jump	19th	Herman van Leeuwen	1.65 metres
Men's pole vault	14th	Coenraad Van Veenhuijsen	2.89 metres
Men's pole vault	15th	Bram Evers	2.82 metres
Men's standing long jump	8-25	Bram Evers	Unknown
Men's standing long jump	8-25	Jacobus Hoogveld	Unknown
Men's standing long jump	8-25	Evert Koops	Unknown

=== Cycling ===
Event	Place	Cyclist	Heats	Semifinals	Final
Men's 660 yards	Semi- finalist	Johannes van Spengen	58.2 seconds 1st, heat 7	Unknown; 2nd, semifinal 1	Did not advance
Men's 660 yards	Heats	Dorus Nijland	Unknown; 2nd, heat 1	Did not advance	
Men's 660 yards	Heats	Gerard Bosch van Drakenstein	Unknown; 2nd, heat 13	Did not advance	
Men's 660 yards	Heats	Georgius Damen	Unknown; 3rd, heat 3	Did not advance	
Men's 660 yards	Heats	Antonie Gerrits	Unknown; 4th, heat 11	Did not advance	
Men's 5000 metres	6th	Johannes van Spengen	None held	8:39.8; 1st, semifinal 1	Unknown
Men's 5000 metres	7th	Gerard Bosch van Drakenstein	None held	8:42.8; 1st, semifinal 4	Unknown
Men's 5000 metres	Semi- finalist	Antonie Gerrits	None held	Unknown; 3rd, semifinal 2	Did not advance
Men's 5000 metres	Semi- finalist	Dorus Nijland	None held	Unknown; 3rd, semifinal 6	Did not advance
Men's 5000 metres	Semi- finalist	Georgius Damen	None held	Unknown; 4-9, semifinal 5	Did not advance
Men's 20 kilometres	Semi- finalist	Georgius Damen	None held	Unknown; 5th, semifinal 1	Did not advance
Men's 20 kilometres	Semi- finalist	Gerard Bosch van Drakenstein	None held	Unknown; 5th, semifinal 2	Did not advance
Men's 20 kilometres	Semi- finalist	Dorus Nijland	None held	Unknown; 6-7, semifinal 3	Did not advance
Men's 20 kilometres	Semi- finalist	Johannes van Spengen	None held	Unknown; 6-7, semifinal 4	Did not advance
Men's 100 kilometres	Semi- finalist	Georgius Damen	None held	Unknown; 7-14, semifinal 1	Did not advance
Men's 100 kilometres	Semi- finalist	Gerard Bosch van Drakenstein	None held	Unknown; 7-14, semifinal 1	Did not advance
Men's 100 kilometres	—	Dorus Nijland	None held	Did not finish —, semifinal 2	Did not advance
Men's sprint	Heats	Gerard Bosch van Drakenstein	Unknown; 2nd, heat 1	did not advance	
Men's sprint	Heats	Dorus Nijland	Unknown; 2nd, heat 5	did not advance	
Men's sprint	Heats	Antonie Gerrits	Unknown; 2nd, heat 14	did not advance	
Men's sprint	—	Johannes van Spengen	Time limit exceeded —, heat 6	did not advance	
Men's team pursuit	4th	Gerard Bosch van Drakestein; Antonie Gerrits; Dorus Nijland; Johannes van Spengen	Walkover; 1st, heat 3	2:44.0; 2nd, semifinal 2	Did not advance

=== Fencing ===
Event	Place	Fencer	First round	Second round	Semi- final	Final
Men's épée	5th	Alfred Labouchere	5-1 (1st in H)	2-2 (2nd in 7)	4-3 (2nd in 1)	2-5
Men's épée	Second round	Jetze Doorman	4-1 (1st in J)	2-2 (3rd in 1)	Did not advance	
Men's épée	First round	Johan van Schreven	4-4 (4th in B)	Did not advance		
Men's épée	First round	Max Dwinger	2-4 (4th in C)	Did not advance		
Men's épée	First round	Simon Okker	3-2 (4th in K)	Did not advance		
Men's épée	First round	George van Rossem	2-6 (7th in D)	Did not advance		
Men's épée	First round	Maurits van Löben Sels	3-6 (7th in E)	Did not advance		
Men's épée	First round	Willem van Blijenburgh	1-6 (7th in G)	Did not advance		
Men's sabre	7th	Jetze Doorman	3-2 (2nd in A)	2-2 (2nd in 7)	5-2 (1st in 2)	1-6
Men's sabre	Second round	Richard Schoemaker	2-2 (2nd in D)	2-2 (3rd in 1)	Did not advance	
Men's sabre	Second round	George van Rossem	4-1 (1st in L)	2-2 (3rd in 2)	Did not advance	
Men's sabre	Second round	Willem van Blijenburgh	3-2 (3rd in I)	1-3 (3rd in 6)	Did not advance	
Men's sabre	Second round	Alfred Labouchere	4-1 (1st in C)	1-3 (3rd in 6)	Did not advance	
Men's sabre	Second round	Adrianus de Jong	2-1 (1st in E)	1-3 (4th in 3)	Did not advance	
Men's sabre	Second round	Gustaaf van Hulstijn	4-1 (2nd in K)	Did not start	Did not advance	
Men's sabre	First round	Lion van Minden	2-3 (4th in G)	Did not advance		
Men's sabre	First round	Johan van Schreven	3-4 (4th in J)	Did not advance		
Men's sabre	First round	Maurits van Löben Sels	0-4 (5th in F)	Did not advance		
Men's sabre	First round	Jan de Beaufort	2-4 (5th in M)	Did not advance		

Event	Place	Fencers	Play-in match	First round	Semi- finals	Final	Repechage	Silver medal match
Men's team épée	9th	Jetze Doorman; Adrianus de Jong; Alfred Labouchere; George van Rossem	Lost to Great Britain; 9-7 Out; 9th place	Did not advance			Not relegated	
Men's team sabre	6th	Jetze Doorman; Adrianus de Jong; Jacob van Löben Sels; George van Rossem	Not held	Lost to Bohemia; 9-8 Out; 6th place	Did not advance		Not relegated	

=== Football ===
The Netherlands was represented by the Netherlands national football team.

Event	Place	Players	First round	Semifinals	Final	Bronze match
Men's football	3rd	Reinier Beeuwkes, Frans de Bruyn Kops, Karel Heijting, Jan Kok, Bok de Korver (captain), Emil Mundt, Louis Otten, Jops Reeman, Edu Snethlage, Ed Sol, Jan Thomée, Caius Welcker	Bye	Lost vs. Great Britain; 4-0	Did not advance	Won vs. Sweden; 2-0

=== Gymnastics ===
Event	Place	Gymnast	Score
Men's all-around	49th	Michel Biet	187.5
Men's all-around	60th	Gerardus Wesling	165
Men's all-around	61st	Reinier Blom	160.5
Men's all-around	62nd	Isidore Goudeket	159
Men's all-around	63rd	Johannes Stikkelman	159
Men's all-around	64th	Emanuel Brouwer	158
Men's all-around	66th	Johannes Posthumus	155.5
Men's all-around	69th	Dirk Janssen	153.5
Men's all-around	71st	Cornelus Becker	152.5
Men's all-around	72nd	Jan Janssen	150.5
Men's all-around	74th	Jan Jacob Kieft	149.5
Men's all-around	78th	Abraham Mok	151
Men's all-around	83rd	Hendricus Thijsen	127
Men's all-around	90th	Johann Flemer	118.5
Men's all-around	93rd	Constantijn van Daalen	116.5
Men's all-around	95th	Herman van Leeuwen	101
Men's all-around	96th	Jonas Slier	96

Event	Place	Gymnast	Score
Men's team	7th	Cornelus Becker, Michel Biet, Jan de Boer, Reinier Blom, Jan Bolt, Emanuel Brouwer, Constantijn van Daalen, Johann Flemer, Johannes Göckel, Isidore Goudeket, Dirk Janssen, Jan Jacob Kieft, Salomon Konijn, Herman van Leeuwen, Abraham Mok, Abraham de Oliviera, Johannes Posthumus, Johan Schmitt, Jonas Slier, Johannes Stikkelman, Hendricus Thijsen, Gerardus Wesling	297

=== Rowing ===
Event	Place	Rowers	First round	Quarter- finals	Semi- finals	Final
Men's coxless four	3rd	Hermannus Höfte, Albertus Wielsma, Johan Burk, Bernardus Croon	None held		Unknown; 2nd, semifinal 2	Did not advance

=== Shooting ===
Event	Place	Shooter	Score
Men's 300 metre free rifle	22nd	Pieter van Waas	768
Men's 300 metre free rifle	32nd	Petrus ten Bruggen Cate	726
Men's team free rifle	7th	Gerard van den Bergh; Christiaan Brosch; Cornelis van Altenburg; Antonie de Gee; Uilke Vuurman; Pieter Jan Brussaard	4130
Men's individual pistol	12th	Jacob van der Kop	447
Men's individual pistol	24th	Petrus ten Bruggen Cate	421
Men's individual pistol	36th	Jan Johannes de Blécourt	381
Men's individual pistol	40th	Gerard van den Bergh	343
Men's individual pistol	41st	Christiaan Brosch	337
Men's individual pistol	43rd	Antonie de Gee	226
Men's team pistol	6th	Jacob van der Kop; Gerard van den Bergh; Jan Johannes de Blécourt; Petrus ten Bruggen Cate	1632
Men's individual trap shooting	7th	John Wilson	53
Men's individual trap shooting	14th	Cornelis Viruly	48
Men's individual trap shooting	15th	Eduardus van Voorst tot Voorst	47
Men's individual trap shooting	15th	Franciscus van Voorst tot Voorst	47
Men's individual trap shooting	22nd	Romain de Favauge	29
Men's individual trap shooting	26th	Jacob Laan	21
Men's team trap shooting	4th	Eduardus van Voorst tot Voorst; Cornelis Viruly; Franciscus van Voorst tot Voorst; Rudolf van Pallandt; Romain de Favauge; John Wilson	Unknown

=== Swimming ===
Event	Place	Swimmer	Heats	Semifinals	Final
Men's 100 metre freestyle	Heats	Lambertus Benenga	1:13.2; 2nd, heat 3	Did not advance	
Men's 100 metre freestyle	Heats	Bouke Benenga	Unknown; 3-6, heat 1	Did not advance	
Men's 400 metre freestyle	Heats	Friedrich Meuring	Unknown; 4-5, heat 7	Did not advance	
Men's 1500 metre freestyle	Heats	Pieter Ooms	27:24.4; 3rd, heat 2	Did not advance	
Men's 1500 metre freestyle	—	Eduard Meijer	Did not finish —, heat 6	Did not advance	
Men's 100 metre backstroke	Heats	Bartholomeus Roodenburch	1:36.0; 2nd, heat 3	Did not advance	
Men's 100 metre backstroke	Heats	Johan Cortlever	Unknown; 2nd, heat 7	Did not advance	

=== Tennis ===
Event	Place	Name	Round of 64	Round of 32	Round of 16	Quarter- finals	Semi- finals	Final
Men's singles	16th	Roelof van Lennep	Bye	Lost to Foulkes	Did not advance			
Men's singles	26th	Christiaan van Lennep	Lost to R. Powell	Did not advance				
Men's doubles	7th	Christiaan van Lennep; Roelof van Lennep	None held	Bye	Lost to Cazalet/Dixon	Did not advance		

Opponent nation	Wins	Losses	Percent
Canada	0	2	.000
Great Britain	0	1	.000
Total	0	3	.000

=== Water polo ===
Event	Place	Water poloists	Quarterfinals	Semifinals	Final
Men's water polo	4th	Bouke Benenga, Johan Cortlever, Jan Hulswit, Eduard Meijer, Karel Meijer, Pieter Ooms, Johan Rühl	Lost to Belgium; 8-1	Did not advance	

=== Wrestling ===
Event	Place	Wrestler	Round of 32	Round of 16	Quarter- finals	Semi- finals	Final
Greco-Roman lightweight	9th	Ulferd Bruseker	Bye	Lost to Malmström	Did not advance		
Greco-Roman lightweight	17th	Jacob van Moppes	Lost to Téger	Did not advance			
Greco-Roman middleweight	5th	Jaap Belmer	Defeated; Grundmann	Defeated; Týfa	Lost to Andersen	Did not advance	
Greco-Roman middleweight	9th	Aäron Lelie	Bye	Lost to Larsson	Did not advance		
Greco-Roman middleweight	9th	Jacobus Lorenz	Bye	Lost to Andersen	Did not advance		
Greco-Roman middleweight	17th	Gerrit Duijm	Lost to Larsson	Did not advance			
Greco-Roman light heavyweight	5th	Jacob van Westrop	Bye	Defeated; Kivimäki	Lost to Payr	Did not advance	
Greco-Roman light heavyweight	9th	Leendert van Oosten	Bye	Lost to Jensen	Did not advance		
Greco-Roman light heavyweight	9th	Douwe Wijbrands	Defeated; Luntzer	Lost to Larsson	Did not advance		

Opponent nation	Wins	Losses	Percent
Bohemia	1	0	1.000
Denmark	0	5	.000
Finland	1	0	1.000
Germany	1	0	1.000
Hungary	1	2	.333
Sweden	0	2	.000
Total	4	9	.308

== Sources ==
- Cook, Theodore Andrea (1908). The Fourth Olympiad, Being the Official Report. London: British Olympic Association.
- De Wael, Herman (2001). "Top London 1908 Olympians". Herman's Full Olympians. Archived from the original on 12 July 2006.
- Reyes, Macario (2001). "IV. Olympiad London 1908 Football Tournament". Rec.Sport.Soccer Statistics Foundation.
