= Swimming at the 1908 Summer Olympics – Men's 100 metre freestyle =

Men's 100 metre freestyle at the Games of the IV Olympiad
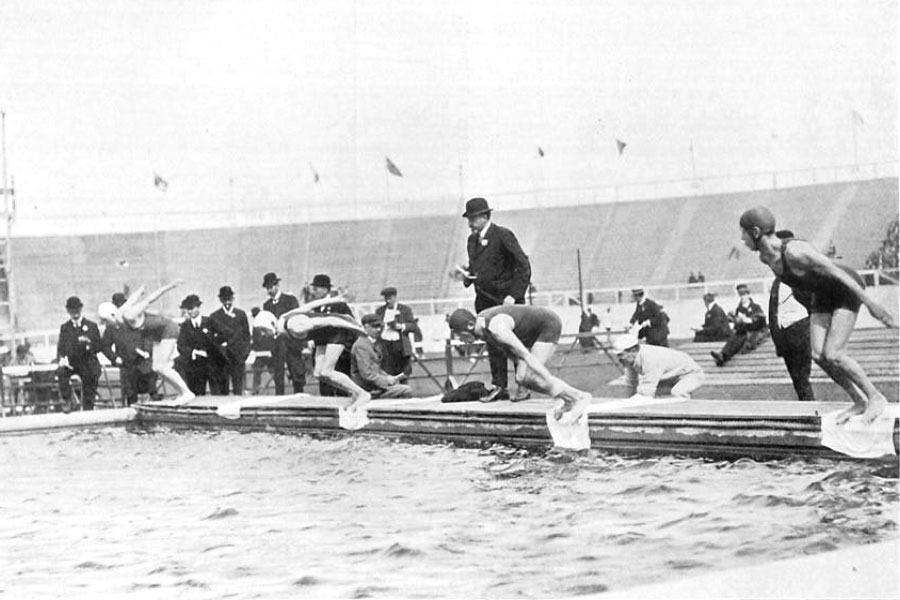
- Swimming at the 1908 Games
- Venue: White City Stadium
- Dates: 17 July; 20 July
- Competitors: 34 from 12 nations
- Winning time: 1:05.6 WR

Medalists
1st place, gold medalist(s)		Charles Daniels; United States
2nd place, silver medalist(s)		Zoltán Halmay; Hungary
3rd place, bronze medalist(s)		Harald Julin; Sweden

The men's 100 metre freestyle was one of six swimming events on the swimming at the 1908 Summer Olympics programme. It was the shortest of the three individual freestyle events, as the 50 yard freestyle had been dropped after its one appearance on the 1904 Summer Olympics programme. The 100 metre event was contested for the third time after it had been held at the 1896 and 1906 Olympics. The 1904 Olympics saw a 100-yard event. The competition was held on Friday 17 July 1908 and Monday 20 July 1908. Thirty-four swimmers from twelve nations competed. Each nation was limited to 12 swimmers.

The event was won by Charles Daniels of the United States, the first time Hungary had been beaten in the event (excluding Intercalated Games). Zoltán Halmay of Hungary, the winner in 1900, finished second. Harald Julin's bronze was Sweden's first medal in the event.

These were the first Olympic Games in which a 100-metre pool had been especially constructed (inside the main stadium's track and field oval). Previous Olympic events were swum in open water (1896: The Mediterranean Sea, 1900: The Seine River, 1904: an artificial lake).

== Background ==
This was the third appearance of the men's 100 metre freestyle (including the 100 yard event in 1904 but excluding the Intercalated Games in 1906). The event has been held at every Summer Olympics except 1900 (when the shortest freestyle was the 200 metres), though the 1904 version was measured in yards rather than metres.

Two of the six finalists from 1904 returned: gold medalist Zoltán Halmay of Hungary and silver medalist Charles Daniels of the United States. Daniels had beaten Halmay at the 1906 Intercalated Games. Halmay held the world record.

Australasia, Belgium, Canada, Denmark, France, Great Britain, Italy, the Netherlands, and Sweden each made their debut in the event. Hungary and the United States each made their third appearance, having competed at each edition of the event to date.

== Competition format ==
With a much larger field than in 1904, the 1908 competition expanded to three rounds: heats, semifinals, and a final. The 1908 Games also restored the wild-card system from 1900, allowing the fastest swimmers who did not win their heat to advance. The nine heats consisted of between 1 and 6 swimmers, with the winner of the heat advancing along with the fastest loser from across the heats (all tied swimmers advanced in the case of equal times). There were two semifinals, intended to be of 5 swimmers each but one of which actually had 6 due to a tie in the heats; the top 2 finishers in each semifinal (regardless of overall time) advanced to the 4-person final.

Each race involved a single length of the 100 metre pool, with no turns. Any stroke could be used.

== Records ==
These were the standing world and Olympic records (in minutes) prior to the 1908 Summer Olympics.

World record	1:05.8	(Hungary) Zoltán Halmay	Vienna (AUT)	3 December 1905
Olympic Record	1:22.2	(Hungary) Alfréd Hajós	Athens (GRE)	11 April 1896 (NS)
Olympic Record	1:13.0(*)	(United States) Charles Daniels	Athens (GRE)	26 April 1906 (NS)
Olympic Record	1:02.8(**)	(Hungary) Zoltán Halmay	St. Louis (USA)	5 September 1904

(*) Intercalated Games

(**) 100 yards (91.44 m)

In the first heat Zoltán Halmay set a new Olympic record with 1:08.2. In the fifth heat Charles Daniels and in the seventh heat Wilfred Edwards equalized the standing world record of 1:05.8. Finally Charles Daniels set a new world record with 1:05.6 in the final.

== Schedule ==
Date	Time	Round
Friday, 17 July 1908	16:15	Heats
Monday, 20 July 1908	11:00; 14:30	Semifinals; Final

== Results ==
=== Heats ===
The fastest swimmer in each heat and the fastest loser advanced. Because there was a tie for fastest loser, both men advanced. Thus, 11 swimmers qualified for the semifinals.

==== Heat 1 ====
Rank	Swimmer	Nation	Time	Notes
1	Zoltán Halmay	Hungary	1:08.2	Q, OR
2	Theo Tartakover	Australasia	Unknown	
3–6	Davide Baiardo	Italy	Unknown	
3–6	Bouke Benenga	Netherlands	Unknown	
3–6	Harald Klem	Denmark	Unknown	
3–6	Herman Meyboom	Belgium	Unknown	

==== Heat 2 ====
Rank	Swimmer	Nation	Time	Notes
1	Otto Scheff	Austria	1:11.8	Q
2	Addin Tyldesley	Great Britain	1:12.0	q
3–5	Gérard Meister	France	Unknown	
3–5	József Munk	Hungary	Unknown	
3–5	Conrad Trubenbach	United States	Unknown	

==== Heat 3 ====
Rank	Swimmer	Nation	Time	Notes
1	Frank Beaurepaire	Australasia	1:11.6	Q
2	Lambertus Benenga	Netherlands	1:13.2	
3–5	Robert Andersson	Sweden	Unknown	
3–5	Henrik Hajós	Hungary	Unknown	
3–5	Poul Holm	Denmark	Unknown	

==== Heat 4 ====
Rank	Swimmer	Nation	Time	Notes
1	Harald Julin	Sweden	1:12.0	Q
2	John Derbyshire	Great Britain	1:12.6	
3–4	Victor Boin	Belgium	Unknown	
3–4	Robert Foster	United States	Unknown	
—	Gyula Hornung	Hungary	DNS	

==== Heat 5 ====
Rank	Swimmer	Nation	Time	Notes
1	Charles Daniels	United States	1:05.8	Q, =WR
2	József Ónody	Hungary	1:13.2	
3	George Innocent	Great Britain	Unknown	
4–5	René André	France	Unknown	
4–5	Hjalmar Saxtorph	Denmark	Unknown	

==== Heat 6 ====
Rank	Swimmer	Nation	Time	Notes
1	Harry Hebner	United States	1:11.0	Q
2	Paul Radmilovic	Great Britain	1:12.0	q
3–4	Edward Cooke	Australasia	Unknown	
3–4	Fernand Feyaerts	Belgium	Unknown	
—	Jenő Hégner-Tóth	Hungary	DNS	

==== Heat 7 ====
Rank	Swimmer	Nation	Time	Notes
1	Wilfred Edwards	Great Britain	1:05.8	Q, =WR
2	Robert Zimmerman	Canada	1:35.0	
—	Gentilly	France	DNS	
—	Géza Kiss	Hungary	DNS	
—	Leo Goodwin	United States	DNS	

==== Heat 8 ====
Dockrell had no competition in the eighth heat.

Rank	Swimmer	Nation	Time	Notes
1	George Dockrell	Great Britain	1:13.2	Q
—	Snowy Baker	Australasia	DNS	
—	Paul Vasseur	France	DNS	
—	Alajos Bruckner	Hungary	DNS	
—	Ragnar Lagergren	Sweden	DNS	

==== Heat 9 ====
Rank	Swimmer	Nation	Time	Notes
1	Leslie Rich	United States	1:14.6	Q
2	André Duprez	Belgium	1:18.0	
—	Sándor Ádám	Hungary	DNS	
—	Lóránt Apor	Hungary	DNS	
—	Axel Persson	Sweden	DNS	

=== Semifinals ===
The fastest two swimmers from each semifinal advanced to the final.

==== Semifinal 1 ====
Rank	Swimmer	Nation	Time	Notes
1	Zoltán Halmay	Hungary	1:09.4	Q
2	Harald Julin	Sweden	1:10.2	Q
3	Harry Hebner	United States	1:11.8	
4	Frank Beaurepaire	Australasia	Unknown	
5–6	Wilfred Edwards	Great Britain	Unknown	
5–6	Paul Radmilovic	Great Britain	Unknown	

==== Semifinal 2 ====
Rank	Swimmer	Nation	Time	Notes
1	Charles Daniels	United States	1:10.2	Q
2	Leslie Rich	United States	1:10.8	Q
3	George Dockrell	Great Britain	1:11.4	
4	Otto Scheff	Austria	Unknown	
5	Addin Tyldesley	Great Britain	Unknown	

=== Final ===
Halmay started fast, leading for the first 30 metres until he was caught by Daniels. Daniels took a slight lead at the halfway mark and won by half a yard.

Rank	Swimmer	Nation	Time	Notes
1st place, gold medalist(s)	Charles Daniels	United States	1:05.6	WR
2nd place, silver medalist(s)	Zoltán Halmay	Hungary	1:06.2	
3rd place, bronze medalist(s)	Harald Julin	Sweden	1:08.0	
4	Leslie Rich	United States	Unknown	

== Results summary ==
Rank	Swimmer	Nation	Heats	Semifinals	Final	Notes
1st place, gold medalist(s)	Charles Daniels	United States	1:05.8	1:10.2	1:05.6	WR
2nd place, silver medalist(s)	Zoltán Halmay	Hungary	1:08.2	1:09.4	1:06.2	
3rd place, bronze medalist(s)	Harald Julin	Sweden	1:12.0	1:10.2	1:08.0	
4	Leslie Rich	United States	1:14.6	1:10.8	Unknown	
5	George Dockrell	Great Britain	1:13.2	1:11.4	Did not advance	
6	Harry Hebner	United States	1:11.0	1:11.8	Did not advance	
7	Frank Beaurepaire	Australasia	1:11.6	Unknown	Did not advance	4th in semifinal heat
7	Otto Scheff	Austria	1:11.8	Unknown	Did not advance	4th in semifinal heat
9	Addin Tyldesley	Great Britain	1:12.0	Unknown	Did not advance	5th in semifinal heat
10	Wilfred Edwards	Great Britain	1:05.8	Unknown	Did not advance	5th or 6th in semifinal heat
10	Paul Radmilovic	Great Britain	1:12.0	Unknown	Did not advance	5th or 6th in semifinal heat
12	John Derbyshire	Great Britain	1:12.6	Did not advance		
13	Lamme Benenga	Netherlands	1:13.2	Did not advance		
13	József Ónody	Hungary	1:13.2	Did not advance		
15	André Duprez	Belgium	1:18.0	Did not advance		
16	Robert Zimmerman	Canada	1:35.0	Did not advance		
17	Theodore Tartakover	Australasia	Unknown	Did not advance		2nd in heat
18	George Innocent	Great Britain	Unknown	Did not advance		3rd in heat
19	Victor Boin	Belgium	Unknown	Did not advance		3rd or 4th in heat
19	Edward Cooke	Australasia	Unknown	Did not advance		3rd or 4th in heat
19	Fernand Feyaerts	Belgium	Unknown	Did not advance		3rd or 4th in heat
19	Robert Foster	United States	Unknown	Did not advance		3rd or 4th in heat
23	Robert Andersson	Sweden	Unknown	Did not advance		3rd to 5th in heat
23	Henrik Hajós	Hungary	Unknown	Did not advance		3rd to 5th in heat
23	Poul Holm	Denmark	Unknown	Did not advance		3rd to 5th in heat
23	Gérard Meister	France	Unknown	Did not advance		3rd to 5th in heat
23	József Munk	Hungary	Unknown	Did not advance		3rd to 5th in heat
23	Conrad Trubenbach	United States	Unknown	Did not advance		3rd to 5th in heat
29	Davide Baiardo	Italy	Unknown	Did not advance		3rd to 6th in heat
29	Bouke Benenga	Netherlands	Unknown	Did not advance		3rd to 6th in heat
29	Harald Klem	Denmark	Unknown	Did not advance		3rd to 6th in heat
29	Herman Meyboom	Belgium	Unknown	Did not advance		3rd to 6th in heat
33	René André	France	Unknown	Did not advance		4th or 5th in heat
33	Hjalmar Saxtorph	Denmark	Unknown	Did not advance		4th or 5th in heat
—	Sándor Ádám	Hungary	DNS	Did not advance		
—	Snowy Baker	Australasia	DNS	Did not advance		
—	Alajos Bruckner	Hungary	DNS	Did not advance		
—	Gentilly	France	DNS	Did not advance		
—	Leo Goodwin	United States	DNS	Did not advance		
—	Jenő Hégner-Tóth	Hungary	DNS	Did not advance		
—	Gyula Hornung	Hungary	DNS	Did not advance		
—	Géza Kiss	Hungary	DNS	Did not advance		
—	Ragnar Lagergren	Sweden	DNS	Did not advance		
—	Lóránt Apor	Hungary	DNS	Did not advance		
—	Axel Persson	Sweden	DNS	Did not advance		
—	Paul Vasseur	France	DNS	Did not advance		

== Sources ==
- Cook, Theodore Andrea (1908). The Fourth Olympiad, Being the Official Report. London: British Olympic Association.
- De Wael, Herman (2001). "Swimming 1908". Herman's Full Olympians.
