= Kosonen =

Kosonen is a Finnish surname. Notable people with the surname include:

- Daniel Kosonen (born 2000), Finnish high jumper
- Eetu Kosonen (1888–1953), Finnish gymnast
- Hanna Kosonen (born 1976), Finnish skier and politician
- Juho Kosonen (1888–1962), Finnish journalist and politician
- Krista Kosonen (born 1983), Finnish actress
- Silja Kosonen (born 2002), Finnish hammer thrower
- Veikko Kosonen (1900–1971), Finnish politician
- Vihtori Kosonen (1873–1934), Finnish journalist

== See also ==
- Mikko (restaurant)
