= Swimming at the 1908 Summer Olympics – Men's 400 metre freestyle =

Men's 400 metre freestyle at the Games of the IV Olympiad
- Venue: White City Stadium
- Dates: July 13–16
- Competitors: 25 from 10 nations

Medalists
1st place, gold medalist(s)		Henry Taylor	Great Britain
2nd place, silver medalist(s)		Frank Beaurepaire	Australasia
3rd place, bronze medalist(s)		Otto Scheff	Austria

The men's 400 metre freestyle was one of six swimming events on the swimming at the 1908 Summer Olympics programme. Its distance was the median of the 3 individual freestyle event distances. It was the first time an event over 400 metres was held at the Olympics (after a 440-yard contest was held in 1904). The competition was held from Monday July 13, 1908 to Thursday July 16, 1908.

Each nation could enter up to 12 swimmers. Twenty-five swimmers from ten nations competed. The winning margin was 7.4 seconds which as of 2023 is the only time this event has been won by more than six seconds at the Olympics.

== Records ==
These were the standing world and Olympic records (in minutes) prior to the 1908 Summer Olympics.

World record	?	?		
Olympic record	6:16.2(*)	(United States) Charles Daniels	St. Louis (USA)	September 7, 1904

(*) 440 yards (= 402.34 m)

In the final Henry Taylor set the first official world record for this distance in 5:36.8 minutes.

== Competition format ==
With a much larger field than in 1904, the 1908 competition expanded to three rounds: heats, semifinals, and a final. The 1908 Games also restored the wild-card system from 1900, allowing the fastest swimmers who did not win their heat to advance. The nine heats consisted of between 1 and 5 swimmers, with the winner of the heat advancing along with the fastest loser from across the heats (all tied swimmers advanced in the case of equal times). There were two semifinals, intended to be of 5 swimmers each but one of which actually had 4 due to a withdrawal; the top 2 finishers in each semifinal (regardless of overall time) advanced to the 4-person final.

Each race involved four lengths of the 100 metre pool. Any stroke could be used.

== Results ==
=== First round ===
The fastest swimmer in each heat and the fastest loser advanced, qualifying 10 swimmers for the semifinals.

==== Heat 1 ====
Place	Swimmer	Time	Qual.
1	Thomas Battersby (GBR)	5:48.8	QS
2	Béla Las-Torres (HUN)	5:52.2	qs
3	Leo Goodwin (USA)	Unknown	
4	Vilhelm Andersson (SWE)	Unknown	
—	Henri Decoin (FRA)	Did not finish	

==== Heat 2 ====
Place	Swimmer	Time	Qual.
1	William Foster (GBR)	5:54.8	QS
2	Robert Andersson (SWE)	6:28.0	

==== Heat 3 ====
Tartakover had no competition in the third heat.

Place	Swimmer	Time	Qual.
1	Theodore Tartakover (ANZ)	6:35.0	QS

==== Heat 4 ====
Place	Swimmer	Time	Qual.
1	Frank Beaurepaire (ANZ)	5:49.2	QS
2	Sam Blatherwick (GBR)	6:16.8	
3	Conrad Trubenbach (USA)	Unknown	
—	Davide Baiardo (ITA)	Did not finish	

==== Heat 5 ====
Place	Swimmer	Time	Qual.
1	Paul Radmilovic (GBR)	6:10.0	QS
2	Aage Holm (DEN)	8:08.8	

==== Heat 6 ====
Place	Swimmer	Time	Qual.
1	Henry Taylor (GBR)	5:42.2	QS
2	Frank Springfield (ANZ)	5:57.4	
3	Mario Massa (ITA)	Unknown	

==== Heat 7 ====
Place	Swimmer	Time	Qual.
1	Otto Scheff (AUT)	5:51.0	QS
2	William Haynes (GBR)	6:21.2	
3	József Ónody (HUN)	Unknown	
4-5	Friedrich Meuring (NED)	Unknown	
4-5	Hjalmar Saxtorph (DEN)	Unknown	

==== Heat 8 ====
Zachár had no competition in the eighth heat.

Place	Swimmer	Time	Qual.
1	Imre Zachár (HUN)	6:09.8	QS

==== Heat 9 ====
Place	Swimmer	Time	Qual.
1	Henrik Hajós (HUN)	6:19.8	QS
2	Archibald Sharp (GBR)	7:00.4	

=== Semifinals ===
The fastest two swimmers from each semifinal advanced to the final.

Semifinal 1

Place	Swimmer	Time	Qual.
1	Otto Scheff (AUT)	5:40.6	QF
2	Henry Taylor (GBR)	5:41.0	QF
3	Thomas Battersby (GBR)	Unknown	
4	Béla Las-Torres (HUN)	Unknown	
5	Henrik Hajós (HUN)	Unknown	

Semifinal 2

Place	Swimmer	Time	Qual.
1	Frank Beaurepaire (ANZ)	5:44.0	QF
2	William Foster (GBR)	5:52.2	QF
3	Paul Radmilovic (GBR)	Unknown	
—	Imre Zachár (HUN)	Did not finish	
—	Theodore Tartakover (ANZ)	Did not start	

=== Final ===
Place	Swimmer	Time
1	Henry Taylor (GBR)	5:36.8
2	Frank Beaurepaire (ANZ)	5:44.2
3	Otto Scheff (AUT)	5:46.0
4	William Foster (GBR)	Unknown

== Sources ==
- Cook, Theodore Andrea (1908). The Fourth Olympiad, Being the Official Report. London: British Olympic Association.
- De Wael, Herman (2001). "Swimming 1908". Herman's Full Olympians.
