= Wrestling at the 1908 Summer Olympics – Men's Greco-Roman middleweight =

Men's middleweight Greco-Roman wrestling at the Games of the IV Olympiad
- Venue: White City Stadium
- Dates: ? (R32 through semis); July 25 (final, bronze match)
- Competitors: 21 from 8 nations

Medalists
1st place, gold medalist(s)		Frithiof Mårtensson	Sweden
2nd place, silver medalist(s)		Mauritz Andersson	Sweden
3rd place, bronze medalist(s)		Anders Andersen	Denmark

The Greco-Roman middleweight was one of four Greco-Roman wrestling weight classes contested on the Wrestling at the 1908 Summer Olympics programme. Like all other wrestling events, it was open only to men. The middleweight was the second-lightest weight class, allowing wrestlers up to 73 kilograms (161 lb). Each nation could enter up to 12 wrestlers.

== Competition format ==
The event was a single-elimination tournament with a bronze medal match between the semifinal losers. The final and bronze medal match were best two-of-three, while all other rounds were a single bout. Bouts were 15 minutes, unless one wrestler lost by fall (two shoulders on the ground at the same time). Other than falls, decisions were made by the judges or, if they did not agree, the referee.

Wrestlers could "take hold only from the head and not lower than the waist." The "hair, flesh, ears, private parts, or clothes may not be seized"; striking, scratching, twisting fingers, tripping, and grabbing legs were prohibited. Holds "obtained that the fear of breakage or dislocation of a limb shall cause the wrestler to give the fall" were outlawed, and particularly the double-nelson, arm up back with bar on, hammerlock, strangle, half-strangle, hang, and flying mare with palm uppermost.

== Results ==
=== Standings ===
Place	Wrestler	Nation
1	Frithiof Mårtensson	Sweden
2	Mauritz Andersson	Sweden
3	Anders Andersen	Denmark
4	Jóhannes Jósefsson	Iceland
5	Jaap Belmer	Netherlands
5	Johannes Eriksen	Denmark
5	Axel Frank	Sweden
5	Axel Larsson	Denmark
9	Edgar Bacon	Great Britain
9	Frederick Beck	Great Britain
9	Gerald Bradshaw	Great Britain
9	Grigory Dyomin	Russia
9	Aäron Lelie	Netherlands
9	Jacobus Lorenz	Netherlands
9	Miklós Orosz	Hungary
9	Jaroslav Týfa	Bohemia
17	Stanley Bacon	Great Britain
17	Josef Bechynê	Bohemia
17	Harry Challstorp	Sweden
17	Gerrit Duijm	Netherlands
17	Wilhelm Grundmann	Germany

=== Bracket ===
First Round
Fall (5:04)
Mauritz Andersson (SWE)
Stanley Bacon (GBR)
Decision
Frederick Beck (GBR)
Harry Challstorp (SWE)
Fall (8:54)
Frithiof Mårtensson (SWE)
Josef Bechyně (BOH)
Fall (18:59)
Axel Larsson (DEN)
Gerrit Duijm (NED)
Fall (3:54)
Jaap Belmer (NED)
Wilhelm Grundmann (GER)

Second Round
Decision
Mauritz Andersson (SWE)
Frederick Beck (GBR)
Fall (9:30)
Johannes Eriksen (DEN)
Edgar Bacon (GBR)
Fall (12:10)
Jóhannes Jósepsson (DEN)
Miklós Orosz (HUN)
Decision
Axel Frank (SWE)
Georgy Demin (RU1)
Fall (7:57)
Frithiof Mårtensson (SWE)
Gerald Bradshaw (GBR)
Decision
Axel Larsson (DEN)
Aäron Lelie (NED)
Decision
Anders Andersen (DEN)
Jacobus Lorenz (NED)
Fall (6:00)
Jaap Belmer (NED)
Jaroslav Týfa (BOH)

Quarter-finals
Fall (6:22)
Mauritz Andersson (SWE)
Johannes Eriksen (DEN)
Fall (2:30)
Jóhannes Jósepsson (DEN)
Axel Frank (SWE)
Decision
Frithiof Mårtensson (SWE)
Axel Larsson (DEN)
Fall (6:20)
Anders Andersen (DEN)
Jaap Belmer (NED)

Semi-finals
Decision
Mauritz Andersson (SWE)
Jóhannes Jósepsson (DEN) (Note: Jósepsson is listed as Icelandic in the Official Report's detailed listing of wrestling results (Cook, p. 333) but Iceland was not one of the 22 National Olympic Committees present at the Games, and was controlled by Denmark at the time. The wrestler is later listed as Danish in the Official Report's list of competitors (Cook, p. 697).) (Note: Jósepsson broke his arm in his semifinal and was forced to withdraw from the bronze medal match; Andersen received third place.)
Fall (24:20)
Frithiof Mårtensson (SWE)
Anders Andersen (DEN) (bronze)

Final
2–0 (decision/fall (6:25))
Mauritz Andersson (SWE) (silver)
Frithiof Mårtensson (SWE) (gold)

== Sources ==
- Cook, Theodore Andrea (1908). The Fourth Olympiad, Being the Official Report. London: British Olympic Association.
- De Wael, Herman (2001). "Greco-Roman Wrestling 1908". Herman's Full Olympians. Archived from the original on 1 March 2005.
