= Abraham Mok =

Dutch artistic gymnast

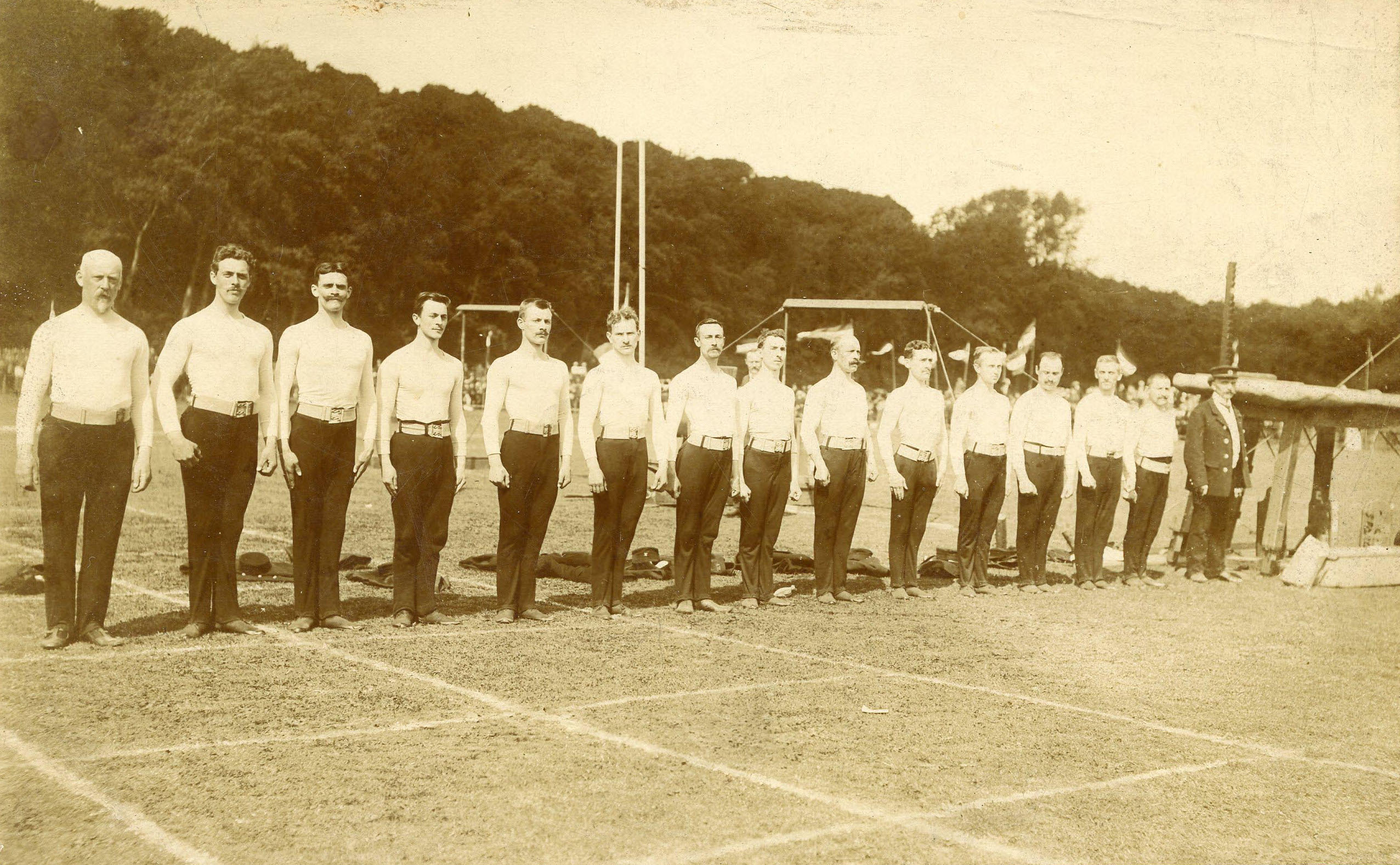
- Dutch gymnastics team, 1908

Personal information
- Born: 15 May 1888 Amsterdam, Netherlands
- Died: 29 February 1944 (aged 55) Auschwitz-Birkenau, German-occupied Poland

Gymnastics career
- Discipline: Men's artistic gymnastics
- Country represented: Netherlands

Abraham Mok (15 May 1888 – 29 February 1944) was a Dutch gymnast who competed in the 1908 Summer Olympics. He is remembered as one of four members of that squad murdered during the Holocaust of the 1940s.

== Gymnastics career ==
Mok was part of the Dutch gymnastics team, which finished seventh in the team event at the 1908 Summer Olympics, held in London.

In the individual all-around competition Mok finished 78th.

== Death and legacy ==
Mok, who had ethnic Jewish parents, was deported to the Auschwitz concentration camp located in Oświęcim, Małopolskie, Poland, and murdered there on February 29, 1944. Mok was one of four members of the 1908 Dutch gymnastics team murdered in the Holocaust, sharing his fate with teammates Isidore Goudeket, Abraham de Oliviera, and Jonas Slier.
