= William Haynes =

William, Willie, or Billy Haynes may refer to:

- William E. Haynes (1829–1914), United States Representative for Ohio
- William S. Haynes (1864–1939), American silversmith and flute maker
- William Haynes (swimmer) (fl. 1905–1912), British swimmer
- Willie Haynes (1901–1981), American baseball player
- William Joseph Haynes Jr. (born 1949), United States federal judge
- Billy Jack Haynes (born 1953), American professional wrestler
- William J. Haynes II (born 1958), American lawyer, General Counsel of the U.S. Department of Defense
- William Haynes (comedian) (born 1993), comedian and internet personality
