= Fred Narganes =

Cuban-American wrestler (1884–1957)

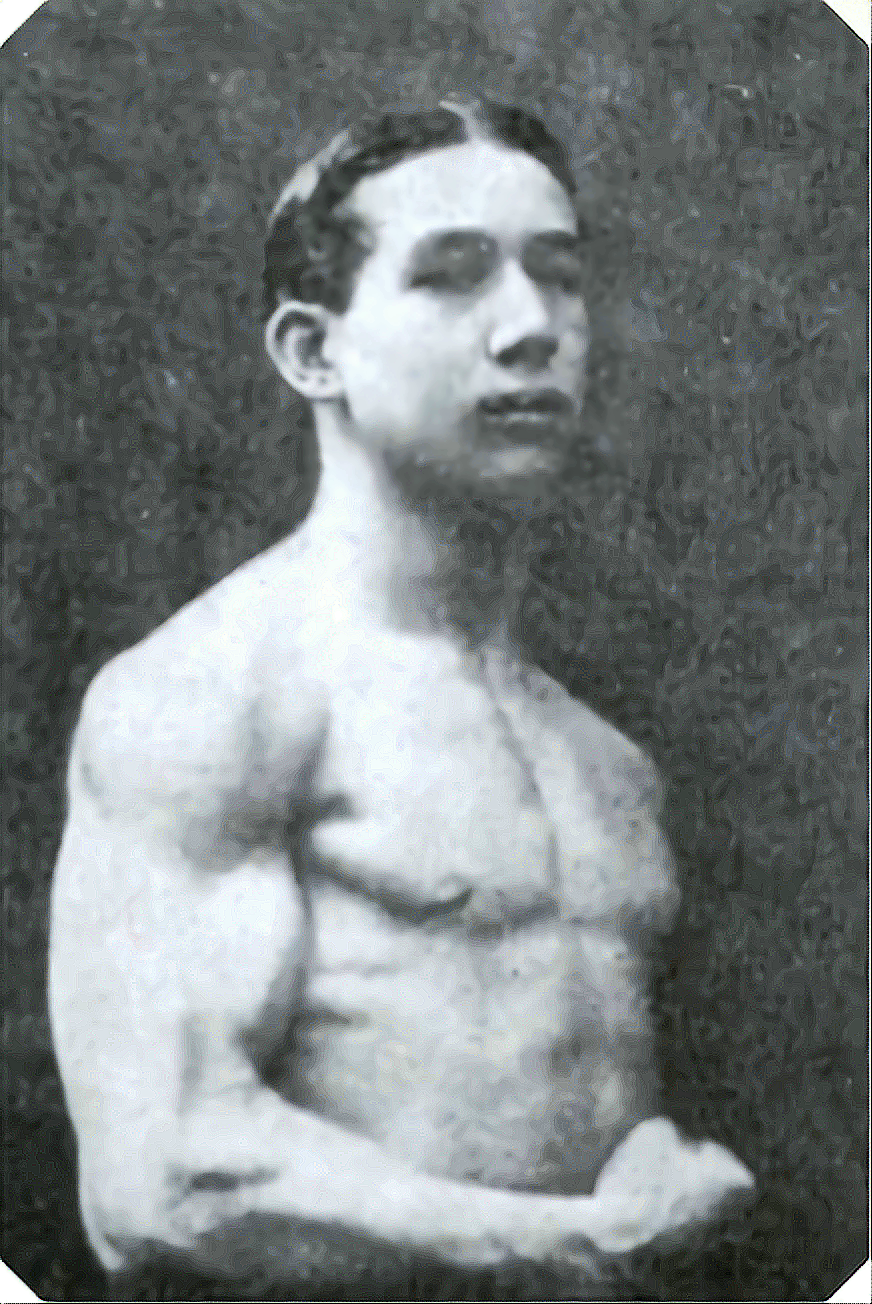
- Narganes, c. 1900s–1910s

Personal information
- Born: March 18, 1884 Havana, Cuba
- Died: 1957 (aged 72–73) Havana, Cuba
- Years active: c. 1902–1910
- Weight: 158 lb (72 kg)

Sport
- Sport: Wrestling
- College team: Columbia
- Club: New York Athletic Club

Frederico Narganes (March 18, 1884 – 1957) was a Cuban wrestler who competed in the United States. A native of Havana, he moved to New York after a time to get an education. He was a member of the New York Athletic Club and won several of their championships. In 1906, he enrolled at Columbia University and in 1907 won the national championship. He was selected to represent the US at the 1908 Summer Olympics in London, England, but lost his first match in the men's freestyle middleweight division. Believed to be the first Latino to compete for an American school and win a national championship, as well as one of the first Latinos to represent the US at the Olympics, he later regained the national title in 1909. He defended it in 1910 before retiring and moving back to his home country.

== Biography ==
Narganes was born on March 18, 1884, in Havana, Cuba. His family was wealthy; his father owned a sugar processing plant, an electric and gas company, and various engineering businesses, leaving an estate valued over $1 million (equivalent to $30,000,000 in 2025) at his death. His family's wealth allowed them to send him to New York in the United States to get an education.

Narganes had started wrestling as a teenager and, eleven days after his 18th birthday won the championship of the New York Athletic Club (NYAC) against a competitor ten pounds heavier than himself. He grew increasingly popular after this, both in the US and in his native country. Two years later, he regained the title of NYAC champion, in both the 145-pound (66 kg) and 158-pound (72 kg) weight classes. In December 1904, he defeated D. C. Newton to gain the NYAC Special Diamond Medal. In February 1905, Narganes won the club's "Howard Medal," defeating a wrestler fifteen pounds heavier than himself. A month later, he retained his championship titles in fights against Jurgensen and Schram, winning two gold medals for the victories. In 1906, Narganes won for the fourth year the middleweight championship of the club, while his brother Aurelio Narganes won the maximum-weight title.

Narganes began attending Columbia University in 1906, through the funding of his family. He won a varsity letter as a freshman, a rare honor for those in their first year. The following year, he won the Amateur Athletic Union (AAU) national championship in the 158-pound (72 kg) class and also won the Intercollegiate Championship. He is believed to be the first Latino to win an amateur US national championship, as well as the first to compete for an American university as a wrestler.

Narganes did not compete in collegiate events in 1908, having been selected to represent the United States at the 1908 Summer Olympics in London. He participated in the freestyle middleweight event, thus becoming one of the first American Latino Olympic competitors, but lost his first match to Frederick Beck. He recounted the match in The Buffalo Commercial: "I was wrestling with an Englishman named Beck. The referee was the most unfair man I ever met in my life. They yell about 'English fair play.' Well, I can't see it. Here's what happened to me. I was grappling with Beck when we both went to the mat. We struck on our sides. Neither of our shoulders were anywhere near the mat, but the referee tapped me on the shoulder and told me I had lost. The American committee set up an awful howl, but it didn't do any good. The referee said I lost and that was all there was to it. 'English fair play,' eh? It's a joke."

Narganes again won the AAU championship in March 1909. The following month, he went to Canada and won the national championship there as well. In 1910, he attempted to defend his AAU championship but was not able to win; however, he did not lose, either, and was allowed to keep his title by rule of status quo. He retired from wrestling after that year and went back to Cuba to help his family's businesses. Little is known about the rest of his life. Narganes died in Havana in 1957. The National Wrestling Hall of Fame and Museum summarized his career as follows: "While he may not be remembered today, this wrestler set the stage for the participation and excellence of the many hundreds of competitors in this sport who have followed his pioneering path over the past 100-plus years."
