= The Boys from Boise (TV program) =

1944 television musical

- Genre: Musical
- Written by: Sam Medoff; Ray Nelson; Constance Smith
- Directed by: Ray Nelson
- Starring: Audrey Sperling; Jack O'Brien; Judy and Cecile Turner
- Music by: Sam Medoff
- Country of origin: United States
- Original language: English

Production
- Producer: Sam Medoff
- Running time: 120 minutes
- Production company: Charles M. Storm Theatrical Company

Original release
- Network: DuMont (WABD)
- Release: September 28, 1944

The Boys from Boise was a television special that aired on the DuMont Network on September 28, 1944, on its New York City affiliate WABD. The special, a musical written and composed by Sam Medoff, was the first such production ever commissioned for television.

== Synopsis ==
In Boise, Idaho, several showgirls get stranded on a ranch; willing to return home, they decide to raise money by becoming cowgirls. While doing so, they have to put up with the ranch’s wicked owner, who manipulates mortgages and controls a posse of rustlers. While on the search for a boyfriend, the ranch's manager—a female undercover agent for the FBI—is investigating the owner's exploits.

== Cast ==
Name	Character	Source
Audrey Sperling	Audrey	
Judy Turner	Judy	
Cecile Turner	Cecile	
Jules Racine, Jr.	Jose	
Jack O'Brien	Bill	
Elizabeth Dewing	Marie	
Joan Charlton	Joan	
Bette Bugbee	Bette	
Jede Charles	Jede	
Frosty Webb	Frosty	
Joan Pederson	Janie	
Don Saxon	Mike	
Gwen Davis	Patsy	
Adrian Storms	Lawson	
Allan Keith	Pete	
Dolores Wilson	Barbara	
Nina Orla	Chiquita	
Jacqueline Soans	Jill	
Betty Carole	Carole	
Sylvia Opert	Specialty Dancer	
Dancers
Joan Pederson
Dorsee Brent
Barbara Pederson
Joy Douglas
Show Girls
Jackie Flynn
Elin Carlyle
Mary Sinclair
Vicki Raff
Shanna Dean
Mickie Ames
The Conover Models
Joan Charlton
Jacqueline Soans
Shanna Dean
Bette Bughee
Dorsee Brent
Eleanor Niles
Jede Charles
Joy Douglas
Mary Sinclair
Frosty Webb
Titia
Mickie Ames
Joan Pederson
Joyce Gates

== Musical numbers ==
Though recordings and scores are scarce, the list of musical numbers is as follows:

- Girls of the 8-to-the-Bar-X-Ranch
- I’ll Take the Trail to You
- Sunset Trail
- That Certain Light in your Eyes
- Chiki Chiquita
- Thousand Mile Shirt
- It’s a Mystery to Me
- Broken Hearted Blues
- Come Up and See Me Sometime
- You’ll Put Your Brand on My Heart
- Rodeo
- Western Omelet
- I’m Just a Homebody
- Star-Spangled Serenade

== Development and production ==
The DuMont Network (WABD) was a station based in New York and was one of the cardinal networks when it comes to establishing television into the monolith of arts and sciences it is today. It is often regarded by experts as the first original televised musical, though it is not often viewed as the start of the trend (usually people will point to the iconic performance of Rodgers and Hammerstein's Cinderella in 1957 as the beginning of the live television musical trend).

DuMont broadcast The Boys from Boise at a time when less than 1 percent of Americans had a television set in their households, preceding iconic pioneers such as the Ed Sullivan Show and I Love Lucy.

The program was produced by the Charles M. Storm Company, and sponsored by Esquire magazine on its original airing. Charles M. Storm's representatives initially planned to use dancers from Broadway shows, but the need for closeups presented a problem. After 75 dancers failed to qualify through auditions because they lacked the right "combination of grace and beauty", the producers turned to Conover models. The models who were selected were taught the necessary dancing skills. The 45 women joined five men to compose the program's cast.

== Reception ==
On October 7, 1944, Lou Frankel of Billboard deemed The Boys from Boise "a worthy experiment" and "an important and expensive first". The following day in The New York Times, Jack Gould described the performance as "entirely praiseworthy because it patently represented an appreciable investment in time and money." He also said, "It did exemplify the difficulties of experimenting under wartime handicaps with a medium so challenging to the imagination as the video art." At the end of his review, Gould wrote, "If nothing else, the show was too ambitious and too long for its own good, because inevitably a 'musical comedy' will seem pretty static when the cameras and receiving screen will encompass only four girls at a time and then without enough room to permit real dancing."
