= Cortlever =

Cortlever is a surname. Notable people with the surname include:

- Nicolaas Cortlever, (1915–1995), Dutch chess master
- Johan Cortlever, (1885–1972), Dutch swimmer
