= Mihály Antos =

Hungarian gymnast

- Born: 2 April 1880 Püspökszenterzsébet, Kingdom of Hungary
- Died: 7 April 1937 (aged 57) Budapest, Kingdom of Hungary

Gymnastics career
- Discipline: Men's artistic gymnastics
- Country represented: Hungary
- Gym: Budapesti Budai Torna Egylet

Mihály Antos (2 April 1880 – 7 April 1937) was a Hungarian gymnast. He competed in the men's artistic individual all-around event at the 1908 Summer Olympics.
