= Gymnastics at the 1908 Summer Olympics – Men's artistic individual all-around =

Men's artistic individual all-around at the Games of the IV Olympiad
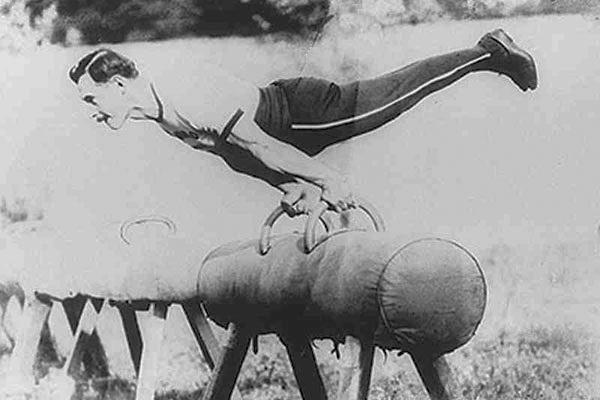
- Gold medalist Alberto Braglia on the pommel horse
- Venue: White City Stadium
- Dates: July 14–15, 1908
- Competitors: 97 from 12 nations
- Winning score: 317

Medalists
1st place, gold medalist(s)		Alberto Braglia; Italy
2nd place, silver medalist(s)		Walter Tysall; Great Britain
3rd place, bronze medalist(s)		Louis Ségura; France

The men's individual all-around, also known as the heptathlon, was one of two gymnastics events on the Gymnastics at the 1908 Summer Olympics programme. As suggested by the alternate name, the competition included seven events with the scores summed to give a final score. Each nation could enter up to 20 gymnasts, with France and Great Britain each entering the maximum. A total of 97 gymnasts from 12 nations competed. The event was won by Alberto Braglia of Italy, the nation's first medal in the men's individual all-around. Silver went to Walter Tysall of Great Britain, the first medal for the nation as well. France's Louis Ségura earned bronze.

Unlike in 1904, the results for the individual all-around were not used for the men's team event in 1908.

== Background ==
This was the third appearance of the men's individual all-around. The first individual all-around competition had been held in 1900, after the 1896 competitions featured only individual apparatus events. A men's individual all-around has been held every Games since 1900.

One of the top 10 gymnasts from the 1904 Games returned: silver medalist Wilhelm Weber of Germany. The reigning (1907) World Champion was Josef Čada of Bohemia.

Canada, Finland, the Netherlands, Norway, and Turkey each made their debut in the event. Germany made its third appearance, the only nation to have competed at all editions of the event to that point.

== Competition format ==
The events were:

- Horizontal bar, swinging movements
- Horizontal bar, slow movements
- Parallel bars
- Rings, swinging
- Rings, stationary
- Pommel horse
- Rope climbing

With the exception of rope climbing, each competitor had a maximum of 2 minutes in each event (with a one-point penalty for exceeding the limit). Horizontal bars were set at heights of 250 cm and 220 cm; parallel bars were set at heights of 160 cm and 148 cm; rings were adjustable in 10 cm increments from 180 cm to 250 cm. The rope, which was 5 cm in diameter, had a top mark at 720 cm and marks below that every 45 cm down to 180 cm.

Other than for rope climbing, each gymnast performed one "voluntary" exercise on each apparatus, with a maximum score of 24 points from each of the 3 judges. Thus, there was a maximum of 72 points per exercise or 432 points from the six non-rope climbing exercises. Points were awarded for "(a) successful performance of exercise attempted; (b) difficulty and combination of movements; (c) style and sequence; (d) variety of movements."

The rope climbing competition required gymnasts to climb hand-over-hand, with legs together and clear of the rope. Gymnasts had to climb in continuous motion; the judging ended when motion ceased to be continuous. The gymnast earned 1/2 point for every 18 inches climbed.

== Schedule ==
Date	Time	Round
Tuesday, 14 July 1908		Final
Wednesday, 15 July 1908		Final, continued

== Results ==
The Official Report gives the places and scores of the first 19. A full list of results was printed in a French journal in August 1908, but was not discovered until March 2020.

Additionally, there is one single discrepancy, in names, with respect to ranking, between the "Le Patronage" journal's coverage and the Official Olympic report. In the Official Olympic report, Joseph Castiglioni of France, among the 19 names listed, is listed last, in 19th place, with no mention of Guido Romano of Italy among those 19 names. In "Le Patronage"'s coverage, Joseph Castiglioni is listed as being in 20th place, immediately after Guido Romano, who is listed as being in 19th place.

Rank	Gymnast	Nation	Score
1st place, gold medalist(s)	Alberto Braglia	Italy	317
2nd place, silver medalist(s)	Walter Tysall	Great Britain	312
3rd place, bronze medalist(s)	Louis Ségura	France	297
4	Curt Steuernagel	Germany	273.5
5	Friedrich Wolf	Germany	267
6	Samuel Hodgetts	Great Britain	266
7	Marcel Lalu	France	258.75
8	Raphaël Diaz	France	258.5
9	Edward Potts	Great Britain	252.5
10	Jules Rolland	France	249.5
11	François Nidal	France	249
12	George Bailey	Great Britain	246
12	Karl Borchert	Germany	246
14	Antoine Costa	France	241.75
15	János Nyisztor	Hungary	236
16	Thomas Dick	Great Britain	233.5
16	Alfred Hodges	Great Britain	233.5
18	Georges Thurnherr	France	232
19	Guido Romano	Italy	230
20	Joseph Castiglioni	France	227
21	Otello Capitani	Italy	226.75
22	Joseph Lux	France	226
23	William Watters	Great Britain	225.5
24	James Graham	Great Britain	225
25	Josef Čada	Bohemia	222.5
26	Dominique Follacci	France	222
26	Gustave Charmoille	France	222
28	Auguste Castille	France	220
28	Wilhelm Weber	Germany	220
30	Fernand Castille	France	218
31	Joseph Cook	Great Britain	213
32	Victor Dubois	France	212.5
33	Josef Krämer	Germany	212
34	Kálmán Szabó	Hungary	209
35	Paulin Lemaire	France	207.25
36	Bohumil Honzátko	Bohemia	205.5
37	G. Meade	Great Britain	205
38	G. Mounier	France	204.5
39	Imre Gellért	Hungary	202.5
40	Heinrich Siebenhaar	Germany	198.5
41	Paul Fischer	Germany	198
42	Edgar Dyson	Great Britain	195.5
43	E. Gauthier	France	195
44	Jean Van Guysse	Belgium	194
45	Sidney Domville	Great Britain	193.75
46	Robert Hanley	Great Britain	193.5
47	Mihály Antos	Hungary	192.5
48	John Watters	Great Britain	187.5
49	Michel Biet	Netherlands	187.5
50	Georg Karth	Germany	186.5
51	William Fergus	Great Britain	183.5
52	Carl Körting	Germany	181
53	Wilhelm Kaufmann	Germany	180.5
53	Félicien Lekim	France	180.5
53	Antoine De Buck	Belgium	180.5
56	Edmund Aspinall	Great Britain	177
57	Gaston Ratelot	France	172.75
58	C. H. Smith	Great Britain	171.75
59	Allan Keith	Canada	170
60	Gerardus Wesling	Netherlands	165
61	Reinier Blom	Netherlands	160.5
62	Isidore Goudeket	Netherlands	159
62	Johannes Stikkelman	Netherlands	159
64	Emanuel Brouwer	Netherlands	158
65	August Ehrich	Germany	156.75
66	Johannes Posthumus	Netherlands	155.5
67	John Skrataas	Norway	154.5
67	Aleko Mulos	Turkey (Ottoman Empire)	154.5
69	Dirk Janssen	Netherlands	153.5
70	Petter Hol	Norway	152.5
71	Cornelus Becker	Netherlands	152.5
72	Jan Bolt	Netherlands	150.5
73	Otto Bauscher	Great Britain	149.5
74	Jan Jacob Kieft	Netherlands	149.5
75	Riku Korhonen	Finland	143.5
76	Carl Klæth	Norway	142
77	Frigyes Gráf	Hungary	141.5
78	Abraham Mok	Netherlands	141
79	A. V. Ford	Great Britain	141.5
80	Orvil Elliott	Canada	132.5
81	Jaska Saarivuori	Finland	132
82	Frithjof Olsen	Norway	127.5
83	Hendricus Thijsen	Netherlands	127
84	Conrad Carlsrud	Norway	124
85	Leonard Hanson	Great Britain	121
85	Iivari Partanen	Finland	121
87	Per Mathias Jespersen	Norway	120.5
88	Eetu Kosonen	Finland	120
89	Emmanuel Boislèvé	France	120
90	Johann Flemer	Netherlands	118.5
91	David Teivonen	Finland	117.5
92	Ole Iversen	Norway	117
93	Constantijn van Daalen	Netherlands	116.5
94	Eugen Ingebretsen	Norway	109
95	Herman van Leeuwen	Netherlands	101
96	Jonas Slier	Netherlands	96

== Sources ==
- Cook, Theodore Andrea (1908). The Fourth Olympiad, Being the Official Report. London: British Olympic Association.
- De Wael, Herman (2001). "Gymnastics 1908". Herman's Full Olympians. Archived from the original on 23 February 2005.
