= Jaska Saarivuori =

Finnish artistic gymnast

- Full name: Johan Wilhelm Saarivuori
- Alternative name: Johan Wilhelm Öhberg
- Born: 3 November 1888 Viipuri, Grand Duchy of Finland, Russian Empire
- Died: 1 August 1938 (aged 49) Joutseno, Finland

Gymnastics career
- Discipline: Men's artistic gymnastics
- Country represented: Finland

Johan Wilhelm "Jaska" Saarivuori (3 November 1888 – 1 August 1938) was a Finnish gymnast who competed at the 1908 Summer Olympics.

Jaska Saarivuori at the Olympic Games
Games	Event	Rank	Notes
1908 Summer Olympics	Artistic individual all-around	81st	Source:

He finnicized his family name from Öhberg to Saarivuori in 1906. He was buried at Ristimäki cemetery, Vyborg.

== Sources ==
- Siukonen, Markku (2001). Urheilukunniamme puolustajat. Suomen olympiaedustajat 1906–2000. Suuri olympiateos (in Finnish). Vol. 12. Jyväskylä: Graface. p. 289. ISBN 951-98673-1-7.
