= Wrestling at the 1908 Summer Olympics – Men's freestyle middleweight =

Men's middleweight freestyle wrestling at the Games of the IV Olympiad
- Venue: White City Stadium
- Dates: July 21 (R16, quarters, semis); July 22 (final, bronze match)
- Competitors: 12 from 3 nations

Medalists
1st place, gold medalist(s)		Stanley Bacon	Great Britain
2nd place, silver medalist(s)		George de Relwyskow	Great Britain
3rd place, bronze medalist(s)		Frederick Beck	Great Britain

The freestyle middleweight was one of five freestyle wrestling weight classes contested on the Wrestling at the 1908 Summer Olympics programme. Like all other wrestling events, it was open only to men. The middleweight was the second-heaviest weight class, allowing wrestlers of up to 73 kilograms (161 lb). Each nation could enter up to 12 wrestlers.

== Competition format ==
The event was a single-elimination tournament with a bronze medal match between the semifinal losers. The final and bronze medal match were best two-of-three, while all other rounds were a single bout. Bouts were 15 minutes, unless one wrestler lost by fall (two shoulders on the ground at the same time). Other than falls, decisions were made by the judges or, if they did not agree, the referee.

Wrestlers could "take hold how and where they please[d]" except that "hair, flesh, ears, private parts, or clothes may not be seized"; striking, scratching, twisting fingers, butting, and kicking were prohibited. Holds "obtained that the fear of breakage or dislocation of a limb shall induce a wrestler to give the fall" were outlawed, and particularly the double-nelson, hammerlock, strangle, half-strangle, scissors, hang, flying mare with palm uppermost, and the foot twist.

== Results ==
=== Standings ===
Place	Wrestler	Nation
1	Stanley Bacon	Great Britain
2	George de Relwyskow	Great Britain
3	Frederick Beck	Great Britain
4	Carl Andersson	Sweden
5	Edgar Bacon	Great Britain
5	Aubrey Coleman	Great Britain
5	John Craige	United States of America
5	Fred Narganes	United States of America
9	Gerald Bradshaw	Great Britain
9	Harry Challstorp	Sweden
9	Horace Chenery	Great Britain
9	Arthur Wallis	Great Britain

=== Bracket ===
First Round
Fall (2:44)
Aubrey Coleman (GBR)
Arthur Wallis (GBR)
Fall (4:48)
Stanley Bacon (GBR)
Henry Chenery (GBR)
Fall (1:55)
Edgar Bacon (GBR)
Gerald Bradshaw (GBR)
Fall (3:10)
George de Relwyskow (GBR)
Harry Challstorp (SWE)

Quarter-finals
Fall (5:17)
Aubrey Coleman (GBR)
Stanley Bacon (GBR)
Fall (2:49)
Frederick Beck (GBR)
Frederico Narganes (USA)
Fall (6:30)
Edgar Bacon (GBR)
George de Relwyskow (GBR)
Decision
Carl Andersson (SWE)
John Craige (USA)

Semi-finals
Fall (3:20)
Stanley Bacon (GBR)
Frederick Beck (GBR) (bronze) (Note: After a protest from his semi-final was rejected, Andersson refused to participate in the bronze medal match, giving Beck third place)
Decision
George de Relwyskow (GBR)
Carl Andersson (SWE)

Final
2–0 (decision/decision)
Stanley Bacon (GBR) (gold)
George de Relwyskow (GBR) (silver)

== Sources ==
- Cook, Theodore Andrea (1908). The Fourth Olympiad, Being the Official Report. London: British Olympic Association.
- De Wael, Herman (2001). "Freestyle Wrestling 1908". Herman's Full Olympians.
