= Henrik Hajós =

Hungarian swimmer (1886–1963)

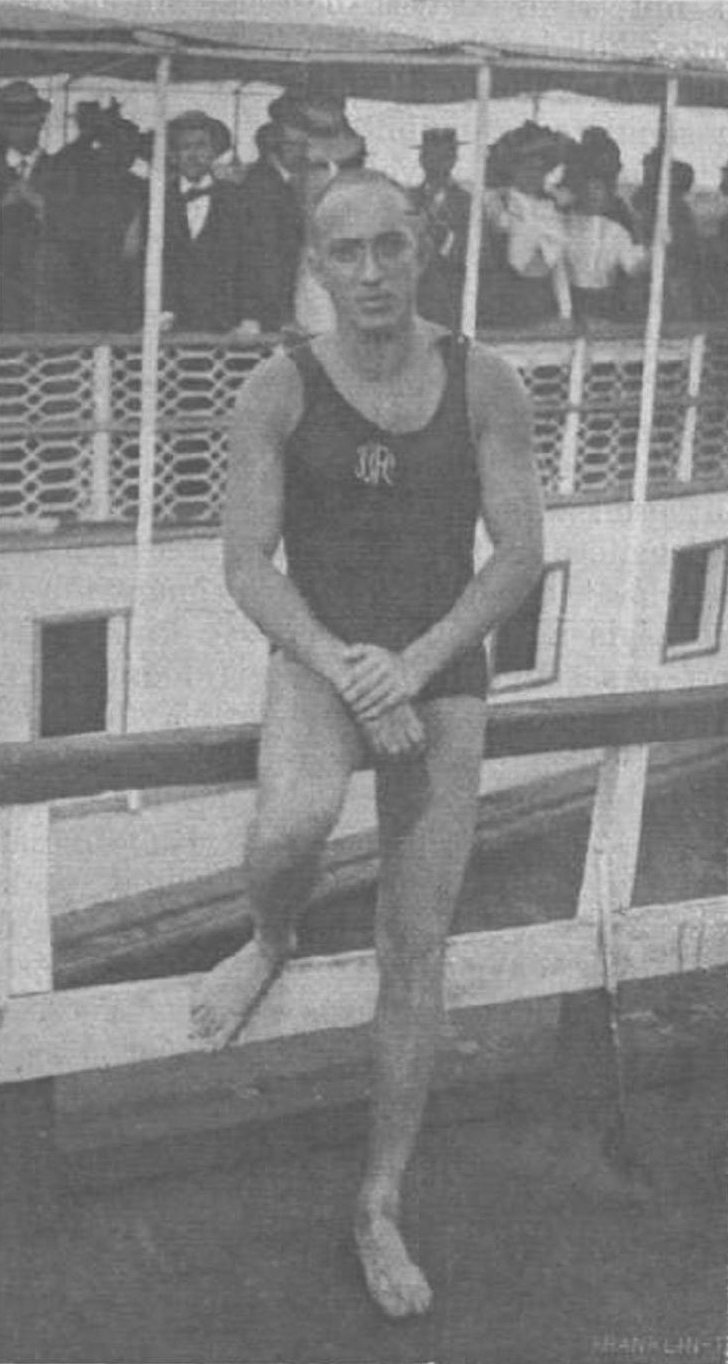

Personal information
- Nationality: Hungarian
- Born: 21 July 1886 Budapest
- Died: 2 June 1963 (aged 76) Budapest

Sport
- Sport: Swimming
- Strokes: Freestyle
- Club: Magyar Testgyakorlók Köre
Medal record
Intercalated Games
| Gold medal – first place | 1906 Athens | 4x250 m freestyle relay |

Henrik Hajós (born Henrik Guttmann; 21 July 1886 – 30 December 1963) was a Hungarian freestyle swimmer who competed in the 1906 Intercalated Games and the 1908 Summer Olympics. He was born and died in Budapest and was the younger brother of Alfréd Hajós.

In 1906, he won a gold medal as a member of the Hungarian 4×250 m relay team. Two years later, at the 1908 Olympics, he was eliminated in the semi-finals of the 400 metre freestyle event. In the 100 metre freestyle competition he was eliminated in the first round.
