= Orvil Elliott =

Canadian gymnast

- Full name: Orvil Ard Elliott
- Born: 15 September 1885 Toronto, Ontario, Canada
- Died: 1 February 1954 (aged 68)

Gymnastics career
- Discipline: Men's artistic gymnastics
- Country represented: Canada

Orvil Ard Elliott (15 September 1885 – 1 February 1954) was a Canadian gymnast. He competed in the men's artistic individual all-around event at the 1908 Summer Olympics.
