= Stanley Bacon =

British wrestler (1885–1952)

Personal information
- Nationality: British (English)
- Born: 13 August 1885 Camberwell, London, England
- Died: 13 October 1952 (aged 67) Streatham, London, England
- Height: 161 cm (5 ft 3 in)
- Weight: 69 kg (152 lb)

Sport
- Sport: Amateur wrestling
- Club: London Amateur Wrestling Society
Medal record
Men's freestyle wrestling
Representing Great Britain
Olympic Games
Gold medal – first place	1908 London	Middleweight

Stanley Vivian Bacon (13 August 1885 – 13 October 1952) was a British amateur wrestler who competed in the 1908 Summer Olympics, 1912 Summer Olympics and the 1920 Summer Olympics. He lived for many years in the Stamford Hill section of London.

== Biography ==
Born in Camberwell, three of his brothers of Edgar Bacon, Ernest Bacon and Cecil Bacon would all become British wrestling champions. As a child, many of his friends and classmates were Jewish. This led to him being sensitive to antisemitism and sympathetic to Jewish refugees throughout his life.

In 1908 he won the Olympic gold medal in the freestyle middleweight class. He also competed in the Greco-Roman middleweight competition but was eliminated in the first round. Bacon moved to Kenya in autumn 1909 and returned to England in January 1912. He competed for the British olympic team again in 1912, but he was eliminated in the second round of the Greco-Roman middleweight event at the 1912 Summer Olympics. In 1920 he was eliminated in the second round of the freestyle middleweight competition.

Bacon was a five-times middleweight winner of the British Wrestling Championships in 1911, 1912, 1913, 1924 and 1925.

From 1921 to 1922 Bacon was an advisor to the Olympic committee of the Second Polish Republic and Czechoslovakia. Several of the wrestlers he trained competed for Czechoslovakia at the 1924 Summer Olympics. He also served as an advisor to Wacław Okulicz-Kozaryn who competed for Poland at the 1924 Summer Olympics.

In summer 1925 he moved to Kenya, living on a ranch that was only a few miles from Thomson's Falls. While in Kenya, Bacon maintained a written correspondence with his colleagues in the British athletic community, as well as with his friends in Poland and Czechoslovakia. In 1928 Bacon travelled to the Netherlands to be a judge at the 1928 Summer Olympics. During the late 1920s and early 1930s, Bacon was neighbors in Kenya with fellow Olympic gold medalist Ronald Rawson, who had a small ranch a few miles away from him. Bacon lived in Kenya from 1921 until March 1938, when he returned to England to attend the funeral of two family members. Upon returning to England he followed the events leading up to the German occupation of Czechoslovakia with great alarm. He was "mortified" by the Munich Agreement, and he became an early supporter of Duff Cooper and Winston Churchill over the issue, however, at the time this made him an outlier, as the Munich Agreement was largely popular in Britain when it occurred. Bacon supported Britain's declaration of war against Nazi Germany in response to the Nazi invasion of Poland. He stayed in England throughout the duration of the war. After the war he found the Soviet occupation of Eastern Europe "terrifying" and he closely followed events such as the rise of communist rule in Poland.

In January 1947 he moved back to Kenya, once again living not far from Thomson's Falls, though this time at a different property. While in Kenya, Bacon tried to remain in contact with his friends in Poland, Czechoslovakia and Britain, however, political developments in Poland and Czechoslovakia made this difficult. Bacon lost contact with all of his friends in Czechoslovakia after the 1948 Czechoslovak coup d'état. In late 1948 he said it was "clear to him" that "communism was the greatest threat to the world." In August 1952 he was advised to return to England after having health complications relating to his heart, and he did so; nonetheless he died in England that October at the age of 67.
