= Walter Tysall =

British gymnast (1880–1955)

- Born: 3 April 1880 Birmingham, England
- Died: 1955 (aged 74–75) Ashton-on-Ribble, England

Gymnastics career
- Discipline: Men's artistic gymnastics
- Country represented: (United Kingdom) Great Britain
Medal record
Summer Olympics
Silver medal – second place	1908 London	individual all-around

Walter Tysall (3 April 1880 – 1955) was a British gymnast who competed in the 1908 Summer Olympics. He was born in Birmingham and died in Ashton-on-Ribble. In 1908, he won the silver medal in the individual all-around.
