= Josef Bechyně =

Czech wrestler

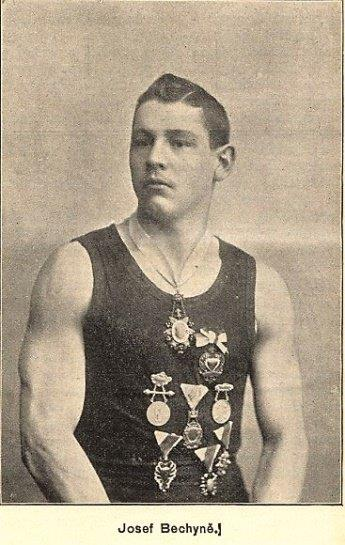
- Josef Bechyně in 1902

Personal information
- Nationality: Czech
- Born: 12 April 1880 Prague, Austria-Hungary
- Died: 1 August 1934 (aged 54)

Sport
- Sport: Wrestling

Josef Bechyně (12 April 1880 – 1 August 1934) was a Czech wrestler. He competed in the men's Greco-Roman middleweight at the 1908 Summer Olympics, representing Bohemia.
