= Mauritz Andersson =

Swedish wrestler (1886–1971)

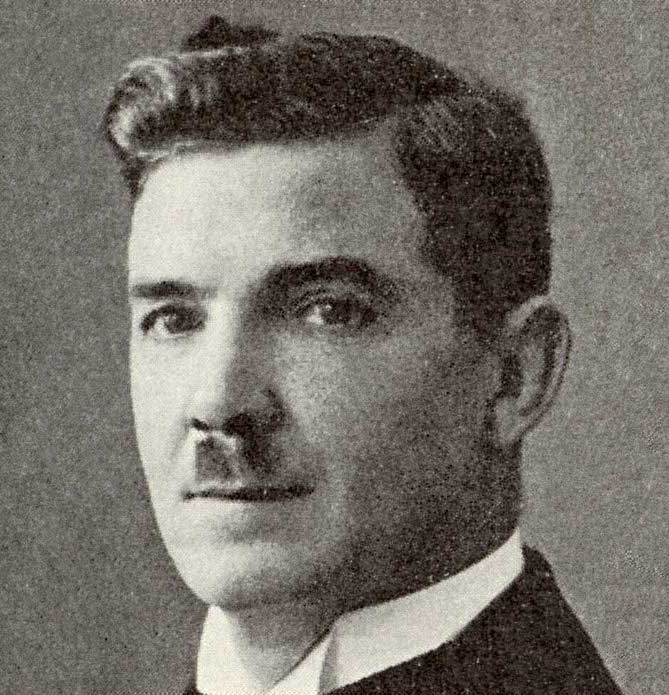

Personal information
- Born: 22 September 1886 Gothenburg, Sweden
- Died: 1 November 1971 (aged 85) Göteborg, Sweden
- Weight: 73 kg (161 lb)

Sport
- Sport: Greco-Roman wrestling
- Club: Örgryte IS
Medal record
Representing Sweden
Olympic Games
Silver medal – second place	1908 London	Middleweight

Mauritz Olof Andersson (22 September 1886 – 1 November 1971) was a middleweight Greco-Roman wrestler from Sweden. He competed at the 1908 and 1912 Summer Olympics and won a silver medal in 1908. Four years later he was eliminated in the fourth round.
