= Christiaan Brosch =

Dutch sports shooter

Personal information
- Born: Christiaan Adolf Willem Brosch; 7 March 1878 The Hague, Netherlands
- Died: 29 June 1969 (aged 91) Marcillac-Saint-Quentin, France

Sport
- Sport: Sports shooting

Christiaan Adolf Willem Brosch (7 March 1878 – 29 June 1969) was a Dutch sports shooter. He competed for the Netherlands in two events at the 1908 Summer Olympics, the men's individual revolver and pistol and the men's team free rifle at 300 metres.

In the team event, Brosch scored 179 standing, 234 kneeling, and 295 prone, for a total of 708. The team placed seventh with 4,130 points total. In the individual event, Bosch came in 41st place with 337 points.
