= Curt Steuernagel =

German gymnast

- Full name: Alfred Curt Steuernagel
- Born: 17 November 1884 Neuschönefeld, German Empire
- Died: 30 July 1917 (aged 32) Kryvche, Austria-Hungary

Gymnastics career
- Discipline: Men's artistic gymnastics
- Country represented: Germany
- Gym: MTV Leipzig-Neuschönfeld

Alfred Curt Steuernagel (17 November 1884 – 30 July 1917) was a German gymnast. He competed in the men's artistic individual all-around event at the 1908 Summer Olympics. He died at Kryvche, Austria-Hungary, in 1918 from wounds received in action during World War I.
