= Ernest Bacon =

British wrestler

Personal information
- Born: 5 June 1893 Camberwell, London, England
- Died: 18 April 1966 (aged 72) Angmering, England

Sport
- Sport: Amateur wrestling
- Event: Heavyweight
- Club: Boro Poly and Vegetarian AC

Ernest Aubrey Bacon (5 June 1893 – 18 April 1966) was an English freestyle amateur wrestler who competed for Great Britain in the 1924 Summer Olympics.

== Biography ==
Bacon was born in Camberwell, the son of an insurance agent. Three of his brothers of Stanley Bacon, Edgar Bacon and Cecil Bacon were all British wrestling champions. He won the 1913 lightweight title at the National Gymnastics Association tournament held at the German Gymnasium.

After World War I, in which he served with the Civil Service Rifles, he won his first major title in 1924, winning the Cumberland and Westmorland national title. He also finished runner-up to George MacKenzie in the national freestyle lightweight category. He went on to win the Cumberland and Westmorland national title again in 1927, 1929 and 1932.

Bacon wrestled out of the Boro Poly and Vegetarian Athletic Club.

At the 1924 Olympic Games in Paris, he finished ninth in the freestyle lightweight class. Bacon was the British champion after winning the 1927 heavyweight title at the British Wrestling Championships.

By profession he was a civil servant with the Post Office and later with the Directorate of Lands and Accommodation and was honoured with an M.B.E..
