= Gaston Ratelot =

French gymnast

- Born: 28 January 1890 Paris, France
- Died: 21 April 1944 (aged 54) Paris, France

Gymnastics career
- Discipline: Men's artistic gymnastics
- Country represented: France

Gaston Ratelot (28 January 1890 – 21 April 1944) was a French gymnast. He competed in the men's artistic individual all-around event at the 1908 Summer Olympics. He was killed in action during World War II.
