= Iivari Partanen =

Finnish artistic gymnast

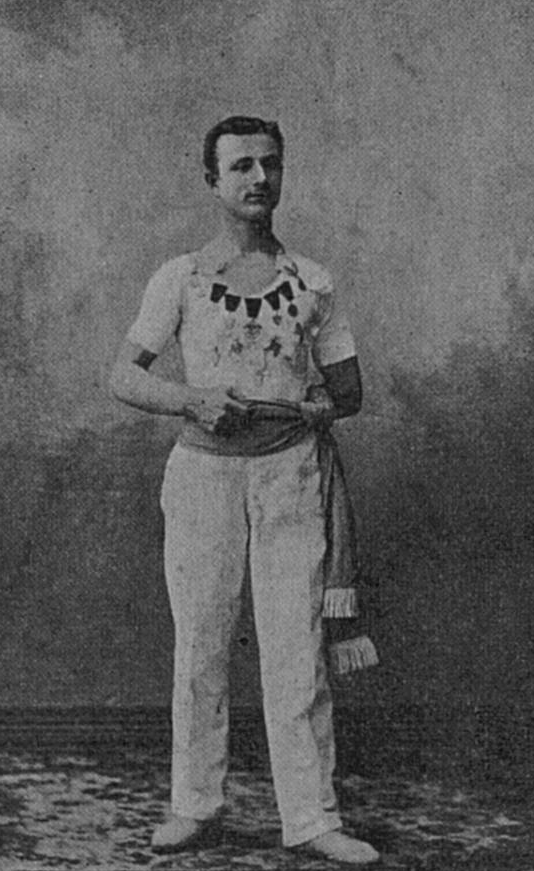
- Partanen c. 1905

Personal information
- Full name: Ivar Aleksander Partanen
- Born: 16 July 1880 Viipuri, Grand Duchy of Finland, Russian Empire
- Died: 8 April 1947 (aged 66) Helsinki, Finland

Gymnastics career
- Discipline: Men's artistic gymnastics
- Country represented: Finland
- Club: Viipurin Reipas

Ivar Aleksander "Iivari" Partanen (16 July 1880 – 8 April 1947) was a Finnish gymnast who competed at the 1908 Summer Olympics.

Iivari Partanen at the Olympic Games
Games	Event	Rank	Notes
1908 Summer Olympics	Artistic individual all-around	85th	Source:

He was part of the Viipurin Reipas team that won the gymnastics Finnish national championship in 1903, 1906 and 1912. He was nominated to their honorary legion.
