= Edgar Bacon =

British wrestler

Personal information
- Born: 9 October 1887 Camberwell, London, England
- Died: 16 December 1963 (aged 76) Christchurch, Hampshire, England
Medal record
Men's Freestyle wrestling
Representing England
British Empire Games
Silver medal – second place	1930 Hamilton	Light heavyweight

Edgar Hugh Bacon (9 October 1887 – 16 December 1963) was an English freestyle and Greco-Roman sport wrestler who competed for Great Britain in the 1908 Summer Olympics, in the 1912 Summer Olympics, in the 1920 Summer Olympics, and in the 1924 Summer Olympics.

== Biography ==
Bacon was born in Camberwell. Three of his brothers of Stanley Bacon, Ernest Bacon and Cecil Bacon were all British wrestling champions.

In 1908 he finished fifth in the freestyle middleweight tournament and ninth in the Greco-Roman middleweight tournament. Four years later he was eliminated in the second round of the Greco-Roman middleweight category. At the 1920 Olympic, he finished ninth in the freestyle middleweight class. His final Olympic appearance was in 1924 when he finished eleventh in the freestyle middleweight tournament.

He competed for the 1930 English team in the light heavyweight class at the 1930 British Empire Games in Hamilton, Ontario, Canada. He won the silver medal after losing the gold medal match with Canadian Bill McIntyre.

Bacon was a four-times winner of the British Wrestling Championships at middleweight in 1927 and light-heavyweight in 1924, 1925 and 1927.
