= John Craige (wrestler) =

American wrestler (1886–1954)

Personal information
- Born: July 24, 1886 Philadelphia, Pennsylvania, U.S.
- Died: August 14, 1954 (aged 68) Philadelphia, Pennsylvania, U.S.

Sport
- Sport: Wrestling
- Event: Freestyle

John Craige (July 24, 1886 – August 14, 1954) was an American wrestler. He competed in the men's freestyle middleweight at the 1908 Summer Olympics.
