= József Ónody =

Hungarian swimmer (1882–1957)

Personal information
- Full name: József Ónody
- Nationality: Hungarian
- Born: 12 September 1882 Ercsi, Fejér
- Died: 17 April 1957 (aged 74) Budapest

Sport
- Sport: Swimming
- Strokes: Freestyle
- Club: Magyar Úszó Egyesület
Medal record
1906 Intercalated Games
| Gold medal – first place | 1906 Athens | 4x250 m freestyle relay |

József Ónody (13 September 1882 – 17 April 1957) was a Hungarian freestyle swimmer who competed in the 1906 Summer Olympics and in the 1908 Summer Olympics. He was born in Ercsi and died in Budapest. In 1906, he won a gold medal as a member of the Hungarian 4x250 m relay team. He also finished sixth in the 100 metre freestyle competition. Two years later, at the 1908 Olympics, he was eliminated in the first round of the 100 metre freestyle event as well as of the 400 metre freestyle competition.
