= Carl Andersson (wrestler) =

Swedish wrestler

Personal information
- Nationality: Swedish
- Born: 10 February 1884 Skurup, Sweden
- Died: 2 February 1977 (aged 92) Landskrona, Sweden

Sport
- Sport: Wrestling

Carl Andersson (10 February 1884 – 2 February 1977) was a Swedish wrestler. He competed in the men's freestyle middleweight at the 1908 Summer Olympics.
