= David Teivonen =

Finnish gymnast

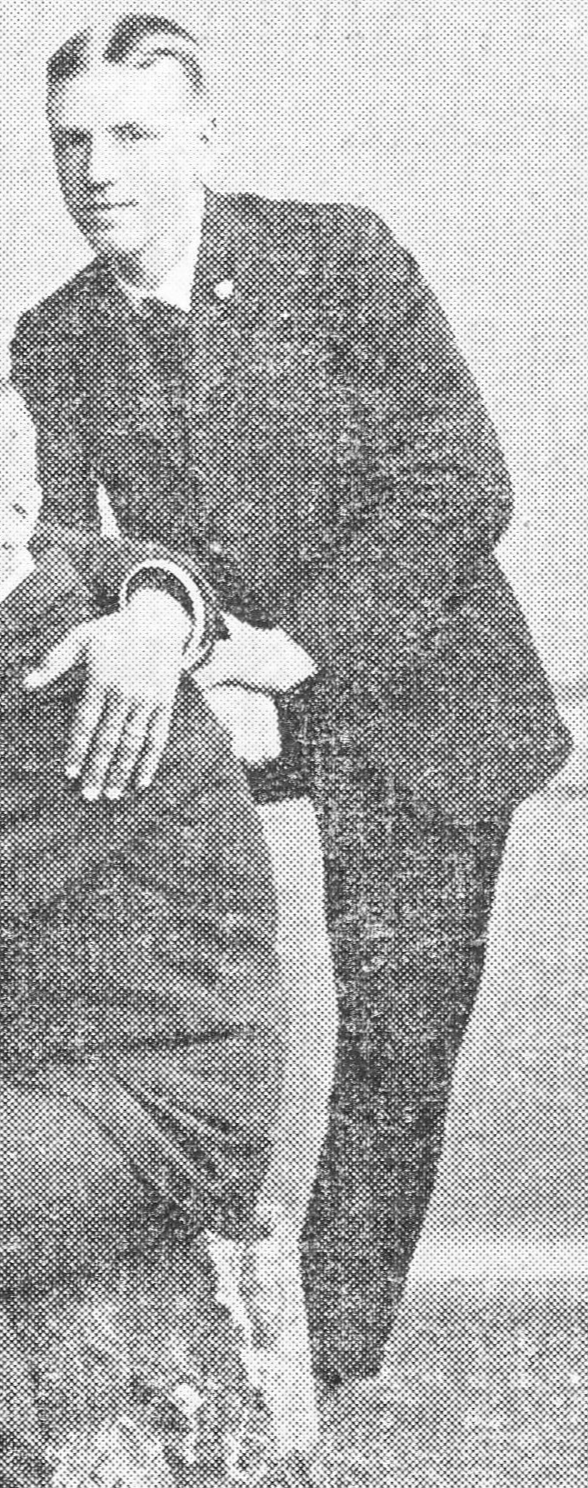

Personal information
- Full name: David Toivo Teivonen
- Born: 6 June 1889 Viipuri, Grand Duchy of Finland, Russian Empire
- Died: 1937 (aged 47–48) Soviet Union

Gymnastics career
- Discipline: Men's artistic gymnastics
- Country represented: Finland
- Club: Viipurin Reipas

David Toivo Teivonen (6 June 1889 – 1937) was a Finnish gymnast who competed at the 1908 Summer Olympics.

== Gymnastics career ==
David Teivonen at the Olympic Games
Games	Event	Rank	Notes
1908 Summer Olympics	Artistic individual all-around	91st	Source:

He was part of the Viipurin Reipas team that won the gymnastics Finnish national championship in 1906.

== Post-gymnastics life ==
He received the Mercantile Marine War Medal.

He moved to Soviet Union and became its citizen in 1937. He died that year.
