= Addin Tyldesley =

British swimmer

Personal information
- Nationality: British
- Born: 21 December 1878 Tyldesley, Lancashire, England
- Died: 9 May 1962 (aged 83) Rothwell, Northamptonshire, England

Sport
- Sport: Swimming

Addin Tyldesley (21 December 1878 – 9 May 1962) was an English swimmer who competed in the men's 100 metre freestyle event at the 1908 Summer Olympics.

== Biography ==
Tyldesley was the son of a local councillor. His family was famous locally for their swimming exploits as five of his relatives were members of the Tyldesley Swimming and Water Polo Club. He placed third in the Southport Salt Water Swimming Championships in July 1896 and placed second in the 1896 Whetley Mills Swimming Gala. He came in second at the 1897 Quarter-Mile Fresh Water Swimming Championship. He participated in the Northern Counties' A.S.A. 150 yards championship in 1902. His Tyldesley Swimming and Water Polo Club team won the Northern Counties Team Swimming Championship in 1901 and 1903. He competed in the breast-stroke trials of the King's Cup swimming competition in 1903 He competed in the 100 Yards Swimming Championship in 1905. He also registered for the 1903, N.C.A.S.A. 150 Yards Championship He was the first (though not the only) member of his family to compete in the Olympics, where he reached the semi-finals of the men's 100 metre freestyle in 1908. Due to his Olympic accomplishments, he became known for being one of the most famous members of the Tyldesley Swimming and Water Polo Club. He won the 1909 Tyldesley Club Gala 100 yards club championship and the Eckersley Cup in September 1909.

Along with his swimming successes, he played water polo for 18 seasons as part of the Manchester and District League. He competed in an international swimming event against French representatives in May 1910. He was the 1911 Midland District swimming champion and was scheduled to defend his title at the 1912 championships. He came in second at the 1912 Midland 100 yards championship. Having trained as a clerk at the municipal council of Tyldesley, he was the Rockwell Urban Council's clerk from 1910 onwards, until he retired in 1946. He served with the Northamptonshire Volunteer Regiment during World War I. He later became a local councillor in Leicester in the 1930s.

Tyldesley died on 9 May 1965 at Rothwell in Northamptonshire. His swimming legacy was later carried on by his relative Duncan Cleworth, who competed in the 1976 Olympics.

== Championships ==
- Northern Counties Team Swimming Championship

1901: Champion (as part of the Tyldesley Swimming and Water Polo Club)
1903: Champion (as part of the Tyldesley Swimming and Water Polo Club)

- Eckersley Cup

1905: Champion
1909: Champion

- Tyldesley Club Championship

1905: Champion

- Tyldesley Club Gala 100 Yards Club Championship

1909: Champion

- Midland District Swimming Champions

1911:Champion
