= Gérard Meister =

French swimmer

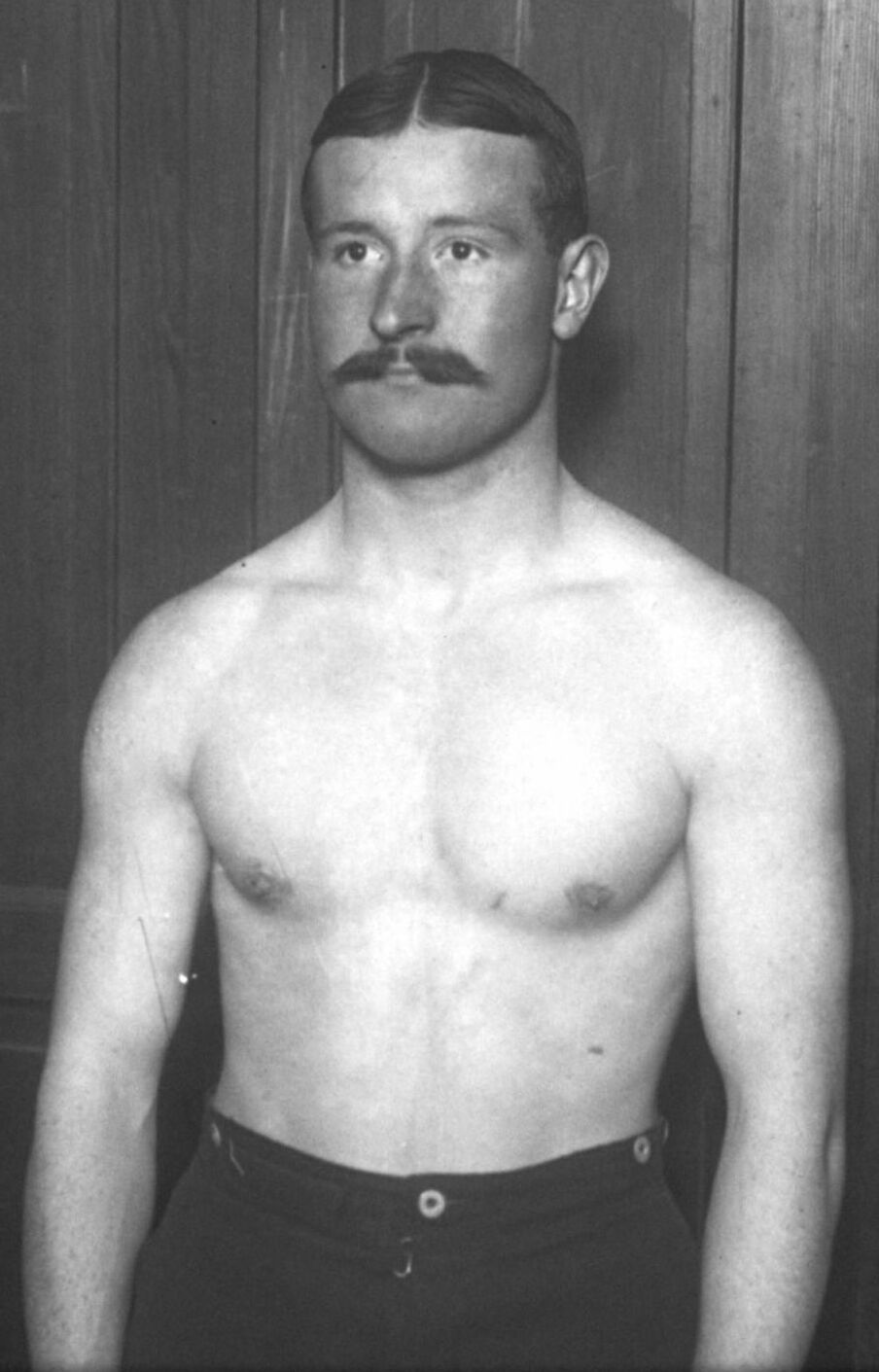
- Gérard Meister in 1912

Personal information
- Born: 4 September 1889 Paris, France
- Died: 7 November 1967 (aged 78) Amiens, France

Sport
- Sport: Swimming, water polo
- Club: Libellule de Paris

Gérard Meister (4 September 1889 – 7 November 1967) was a French freestyle swimmer. He competed in the 100 m event at the 1908 and 1912 Summer Olympics, but failed to reach the finals.
