= Lambertus Benenga =

Dutch swimmer (1886–1963)

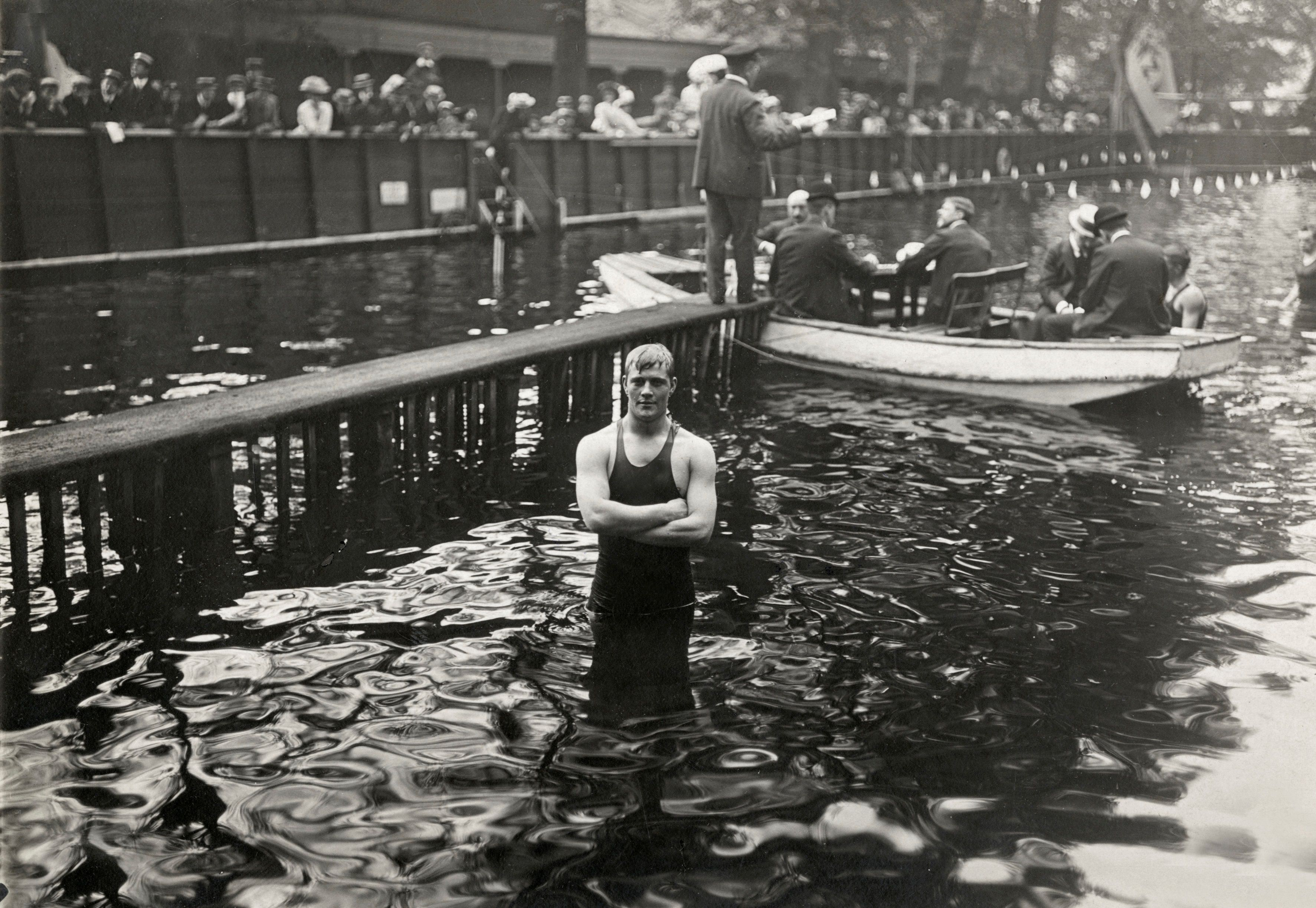

Personal information
- Born: 17 February 1886 Rotterdam, Netherlands
- Died: 3 August 1963 (aged 77) Geldrop, Netherlands

Sport
- Sport: Swimming

Lambertus "Lamme" Benenga (17 February 1886 – 3 August 1963) was a Dutch freestyle swimmer who competed in the 1908 Summer Olympics.

He participated in the 100 metre freestyle competition, but he was eliminated in the first round.

He is the older brother of Bouke Benenga.
