= William Haynes (swimmer) =

British swimmer

Personal information
- Full name: William Henry Haynes
- Born: 1885 or 1886
- Died: 26 November 1954 (aged 68) Victoria Park, Western Australia

Sport
- Sport: Swimming

William Haynes was a British swimmer. He competed in the men's 400 metre freestyle at the 1908 Summer Olympics.

From 1905 to 1912, Haynes held all Scottish swimming championships from 100 yards up to half a mile. He was the first British amateur swimmer to swim 100 yards under the minute. His record—59 seconds—was achieved at the Scottish championships held at Leith.

By 1915, he had migrated to Western Australia and that year won the state's 100 yards championship.

In 1916, he married Mary Helena Philp in Perth, Western Australia. She died in 1947.

He was district officer of the Kalgoorlie Fire Brigade for almost ten years until being promoted in October 1943. His next appointment was to the Victoria Park District, Western Australia.

Haynes died at Victoria Park on 26 November 1954, aged 68. He was buried in the Presbyterian portion of the Karrakatta Cemetery, Western Australia.
