= Reinier Blom =

Dutch gymnast

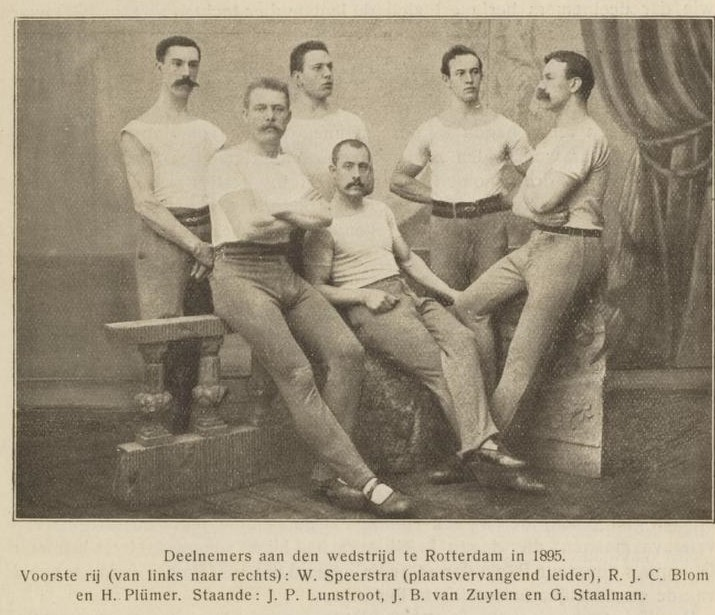
- Blom, center front row, in 1895

Personal information
- Full name: Reinier Jan Cornelis Blom
- Born: 31 March 1867 Amsterdam, Netherlands
- Died: 12 August 1943 (aged 76) Amsterdam, Netherlands

Gymnastics career
- Discipline: Men's artistic gymnastics
- Country represented: Netherlands

Reinier Jan Cornelis Blom (31 March 1867 in Amsterdam – 12 August 1943 in Amsterdam) was a Dutch gymnast who competed in the 1908 Summer Olympics. He was part of the Dutch gymnastics team, which finished seventh in the team event. In the individual all-around competition, he finished 61st.

Blom took up gymnastics in 1880 and was active until 1938. During 50 years he was member of KTV Olympia, a gymnastics club in Amsterdam. With this team he won the national championship in 1895. He was founding member of the Royal Dutch Christian Gymnastics Association.
