= Karel Heijting =

Dutch footballer

Personal information
- Date of birth: 1 May 1883
- Place of birth: Kutoarjo, Dutch East Indies
- Date of death: 14 June 1951 (aged 68)
- Place of death: Boulogne-Billancourt, France

Youth career
- Swift

Senior career*
Years	Team	Apps	(Gls)
1900-1910	HVV		
1910-1912	Red Star Amical		

International career
1907-1910	Netherlands	17	(0)
- * Club domestic league appearances and goals

Olympic medal record

Men's Football
Bronze medal – third place	1908 London	Team competition

Karel Heijting (born 1 May 1883 in Kutoarjo, Central Java, Dutch East Indies – died June 1951 in Paris, France) was a Dutch football player who competed in the 1908 Summer Olympics. He was a member of the Dutch team, which won the bronze medal in the football tournament.

Born on Java, Dutch East Indies, he played 10 years for HVV, then moved to work for a bank in Paris and joined the Red Star Amical Club football team. Heijting was only one of four of his battalion who survived the Battle of Arras in May 1915 during World War I. After being injured he recovered and was sent to a Prisoner of War camp in Germany where he stayed until the end of the war.

He played 17 matches for the Netherlands national football team.
