= Jaap Belmer =

Dutch wrestler (1886–1936)

Personal information
- Nationality: Dutch
- Born: 22 January 1886 Amsterdam, Netherlands
- Died: 18 April 1936 (aged 50) Amsterdam, Netherlands

Sport
- Sport: Wrestling

Jaap Belmer (22 January 1886 – 18 April 1936) was a Dutch wrestler. He competed in the men's Greco-Roman middleweight at the 1908 Summer Olympics. After defeating Wilhelm Grundmann from Germany, he went on to finish in fifth place in the tournament.
