= Emanuel Brouwer =

Dutch gymnast

- Born: 28 May 1881 Amsterdam, Netherlands
- Died: 6 July 1954 (aged 73) Huizen, Netherlands

Gymnastics career
- Discipline: Men's artistic gymnastics
- Country represented: Netherlands

Emanuel Brouwer (28 May 1881 – 6 July 1954) was a Dutch gymnast who competed in the 1908 Summer Olympics. He was part of the Dutch gymnastics team, which finished seventh in the team event. In the individual all-around competition, he finished 64th. He was born in Amsterdam and died in Huizen.
