= Herman van Leeuwen =

Dutch gymnast and high jumper

- Full name: Hermanus Nicolaas van Leeuwen
- Born: 8 June 1884 Amsterdam, Netherlands
- Died: 7 February 1926 (aged 41) Amsterdam, Netherlands

Gymnastics career
- Discipline: Men's artistic gymnastics
- Country represented: Netherlands

Hermanus Nicolaas van Leeuwen (8 June 1884 in Amsterdam – 7 February 1926 in Amsterdam) was a Dutch gymnast and high jumper who competed in the 1908 Summer Olympics. He was part of the Dutch gymnastics team, which finished seventh in the team event. In the individual all-around competition, he finished 95th.

He also participated in the high jump competition and finished 19th.

The Herman van Leeuwen Cup was named after him.
