= Johann Flemer =

Dutch gymnast

- Born: 16 February 1888 Amsterdam, Netherlands
- Died: 12 August 1955 (aged 67) The Hague, Netherlands

Gymnastics career
- Discipline: Men's artistic gymnastics
- Country represented: Netherlands

Johann Heinrich Flemer (16 February 1888 in Amsterdam – 12 August 1955 in The Hague) was a Dutch gymnast who competed in the 1908 Summer Olympics. He was part of the Dutch gymnastics team, which finished seventh in the team event. In the individual all-around competition, he finished 90th.
