= Constantijn van Daalen =

Dutch gymnast

- Born: 7 April 1884 Brielle, Netherlands
- Died: 5 September 1931 (aged 47) Amsterdam, Netherlands

Gymnastics career
- Discipline: Men's artistic gymnastics
- Country represented: Netherlands

Constantijn van Daalen (7 April 1884 in Brielle – 5 September 1931 in Amsterdam) was a Dutch gymnast who competed in the 1908 Summer Olympics. He was part of the Dutch gymnastics team, which finished seventh in the team event. In the individual all-around competition, he finished 93rd.
