= Juho Kosonen =

Finnish journalist and politician (1888–1962)

Antti Juho (A. J.) Kosonen (7 December 1888 – 26 July 1962) was a Finnish journalist and politician, born in Kerimäki. He was a member of the Parliament of Finland from 1930 to 1939 and from 1944 to 1945, representing the Social Democratic Party of Finland (SDP). He was a presidential elector in the 1937, 1937, 1940 and 1943 presidential elections. From 1918 to 1919, Kosonen was imprisoned for having sided with the Reds during the Finnish Civil War.
