= Sándor Ádám =

Hungarian water polo player

Personal information
- Born: 1 February 1892; Budapest, Austria-Hungary

Sport
- Sport: Water polo

Sándor Ádám (1 February 1892, date of death unknown) was a Hungarian water polo player who competed in the 1912 Summer Olympics. He was part of the Hungarian team in the 1912 tournament.
