= Johannes Posthumus =

Dutch gymnast

- Born: 24 September 1887 Gouda, Netherlands
- Died: 12 December 1978 (aged 91) Utrecht, Netherlands

Gymnastics career
- Discipline: Men's artistic gymnastics
- Country represented: Netherlands

Johannes Jacobus Posthumus (24 September 1887 in Gouda – 12 December 1978 in Utrecht) was a Dutch gymnast who competed in the 1908 Summer Olympics. He was part of the Dutch gymnastics team, which finished seventh in the team event. In the individual all-around competition, he finished 66th.
