= Veikko Kosonen =

Finnish politician

Veikko Johannes Kosonen (24 November 1900, Kerimäki – 11 June 1971) was a Finnish politician. He was a Member of the Parliament of Finland from May to July 1948, representing the Finnish People's Democratic League (SKDL).
