= Louis Otten =

Dutch footballer

Olympic medal record

Men's Football
Bronze medal – third place	1908 London	Team competition

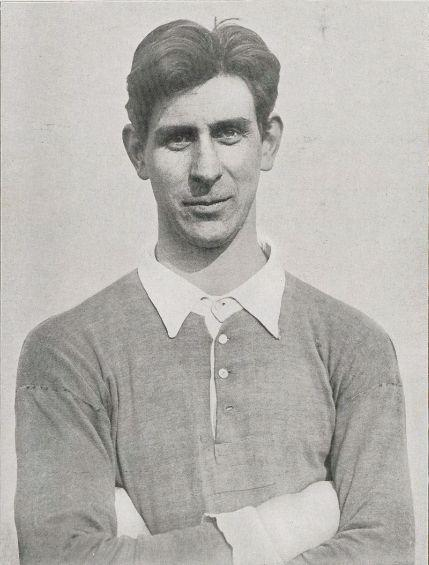
Lou Otten

Louis "Lou" Otten (November 5, 1883 in Rijswijk – November 7, 1946 in The Hague) was a Dutch football (soccer) player who competed in the 1908 Summer Olympics. He was a member of the Dutch team, which won the bronze medal in the football tournament.

He was also a doctor and scientist credited as the inventor of the bubonic vaccine during his tenure at Pasteur Institute in Bandung, Netherlands Indies (now Indonesia).

Otten was elected a corresponding member of the Royal Netherlands Academy of Arts and Sciences in 1934.
