= Bouke Benenga =

Dutch swimmer (1888–1968)

Personal information
- Born: 27 March 1888 Rotterdam, Netherlands
- Died: 4 January 1968 (aged 79) Rotterdam, Netherlands

Sport
- Sport: Swimming

Bouke Benenga (27 March 1888 – 4 January 1968) was a Dutch freestyle swimmer and water polo player who competed in the 1908 Summer Olympics.

He participated in the 100 metre freestyle competition, but he was eliminated in the first round.

Also he was part of the Dutch water polo team, which finished fourth in the 1908 tournament.

He is the younger brother of Lamme Benenga.
