= Anders Andersen (wrestler) =

Danish wrestler (1881–1961)

- Born: 26 October 1881; Copenhagen, Denmark
- Died: 19 February 1961 (aged 79); Copenhagen, Denmark
Medal record
Men's Greco-Roman wrestling
Representing Denmark
Olympic Games
Bronze medal – third place	1908 London	Middleweight

Anders Andersen (26 October 1881 – 19 February 1961) was a Danish sport wrestler who competed in the 1908 Summer Olympics and in the 1912 Summer Olympics.

In 1908, he won the bronze medal in the Greco-Roman middleweight class.

Four years later, he was eliminated in the second round of the Greco-Roman middleweight competition.
