= Wilhelm Grundmann =

German wrestler

Personal information
- Nationality: German

Sport
- Sport: Wrestling
- Club: Sportclub Heros 03 Berlin

Wilhelm Grundmann was a German wrestler. He competed in the men's Greco-Roman middleweight at the 1908 Summer Olympics. Grundmann was the only German wrestler competing at the games. He was eliminated in the first round by Dutch Jaap Belmer, and competed for Sportclub Heros 03 Berlin. He ended the tournament tied for 17th place, and came in at an official weight of 161 lbs (73 kg).
