= Jaroslav Týfa =

Czech wrestler

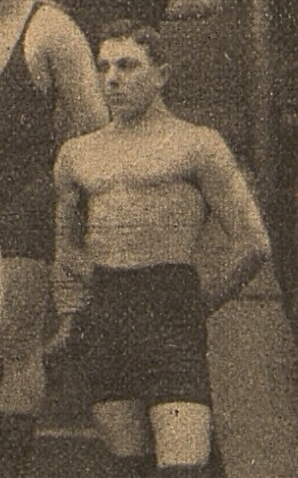
- Týfa in 1906

Personal information
- Nationality: Czech

Sport
- Sport: Wrestling

Jaroslav Týfa was a Czech wrestler. He competed in the men's Greco-Roman middleweight at the 1908 Summer Olympics, representing Bohemia.
