= Johannes Josefsson =

Icelandic artist, investor, and wrestler

Jóhannes Jósefsson
Personal information
- Nationality: Icelandic
- Born: 27 July 1883 Akureyri, Iceland
- Died: 5 October 1968 (aged 85) Reykjavík, Iceland

Sport
- Sport: Wrestling

Jóhannes Jósefsson (28 July 1883 – 4 October 1968), also known as Jóhannes á Borg , was an Icelandic Glíma champion, circus performer and hotel owner. He was known for travelling around the world and challenging fighters from different martial arts backgrounds. He wrote an English book about Glima in 1908 titled "Icelandic Wrestling".

Jóhannes was born in the north of Iceland in 1883 and became a champion of Icelandic wrestling at an early age. He competed in Greco-Roman wrestling at the 1908 London Olympics at the age of 25 and came in fourth. He then traveled the world, ending up in America with Barnum & Baileys Greatest Show on Earth, where he performed as an unarmed contender fighting opponents even armed with knives. Jóhannes became a wealthy man from his circus activities and returned to Iceland unscathed in 1927. After his return, he invested more than 1 million Krona in the Hotel Borg, Iceland's classiest hotel for many years. Jóhannes ran the Borg until 1960 when he retired.

His wife Caroline Jósefsson is known for having been immortalized in the Seattle Daily Times on April 19th 1914 with an article about self-defense for women, as it was frequently done at the time by many martial artists. The article, called "Iceland show american girls how to repell the Mashers" belongs to a long list of anti mashers articles from that time (see Suffrajitsu). The article is archived on microfilms at the Denver Public Library and has been reproduced here.

== Bibliography ==
Jóhannes á Borg: Minningar glímukappans. [Josefsson's memoirs, as told to Stefán Jónsson.] Reykjavik. 1964.
