= Allan Keith =

Canadian gymnast

- Full name: Allan George Keith
- Born: 22 February 1889 Toronto, Ontario, Canada
- Died: 21 November 1953 (aged 64) Toronto, Ontario, Canada

Gymnastics career
- Discipline: Men's artistic gymnastics
- Country represented: Canada

Allan George Keith (22 February 1889 – 21 November 1953) was a Canadian gymnast. He competed in the men's artistic individual all-around event at the 1908 Summer Olympics.
