= Eetu Kosonen =

Finnish gymnast

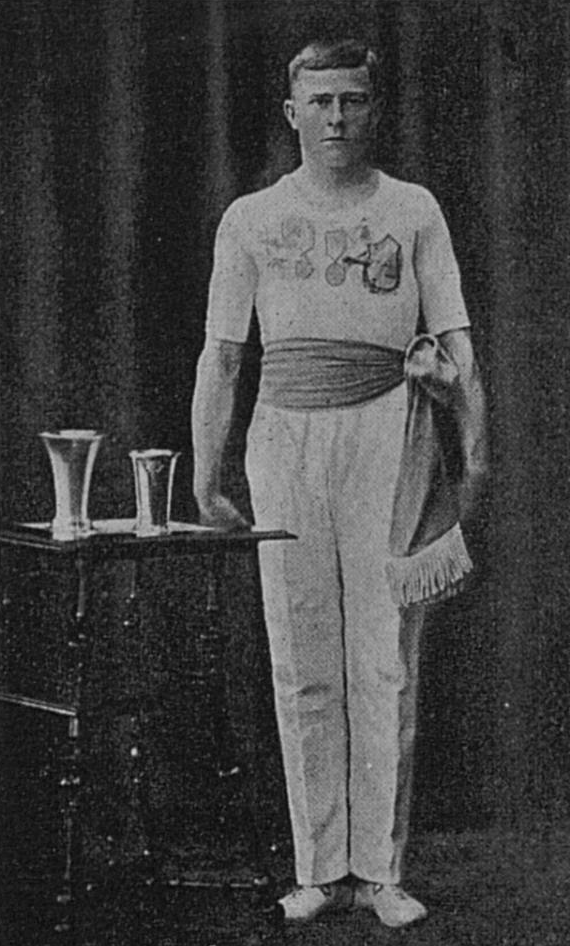
- Kosonen c. 1905

Personal information
- Full name: Eniu Eetu Kosonen
- Born: 25 September 1888
- Died: 23 December 1953 (aged 65) Ulvila, Finland

Gymnastics career
- Discipline: Men's artistic gymnastics
- Country represented: Finland
- Club: Viipurin Reipas

Eniu Eetu Kosonen (25 September 1888 – 23 December 1953) was a Finnish gymnast who competed at the 1908 Summer Olympics.

Eetu Kosonen at the Olympic Games
Games	Event	Rank	Notes
1908 Summer Olympics	Artistic individual all-around	88th	Source:

He was part of the Viipurin Reipas team that won the gymnastics Finnish national championship in 1903, 1906 and 1912. He was nominated into their honorary legion.
