= Frans de Bruijn Kops =

Dutch footballer

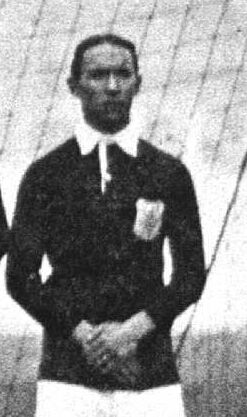
- De Bruijn Kops (1908)

Personal information
- Full name: George François de Bruijn Kops
- Date of birth: 28 October 1886
- Place of birth: Benkoelen, Dutch East Indies
- Date of death: 22 November 1979 (aged 93)
- Place of death: The Hague, Netherlands
- Position: Striker

Youth career
- Achilles

Senior career*
| Years | Team | Apps | (Gls) |
| 1904–1909 | HBS | | |

International career
| 1906–1908 | Netherlands | 3 | (1) |
- * Club domestic league appearances and goals

Olympic medal record

Men's Football
| Bronze medal – third place | 1908 London | Team competition |

George François "Frans" de Bruijn Kops (28 October 1886 in Benkoelen, Dutch East Indies – 22 November 1979 in The Hague) was a Dutch football (soccer) player who competed in the 1908 Summer Olympics. He was a member of the Dutch team, which won the bronze medal in the football tournament.

== Club career ==
He played for HBS from The Hague, after joining them from Achilles Rotterdam.

== International career ==
De Bruijn Kops made his debut for the Netherlands in an April 1906 friendly match against Belgium and earned a total of 3 caps, scoring 1 goal. His final international was an October 1908 1908 Summer Olympics against Sweden.
