= Friedrich Meuring =

Dutch swimmer

Personal information
- Born: 6 June 1882 Amsterdam, Netherlands
- Died: 28 May 1973 (aged 90) Haarlem, Netherlands

Sport
- Sport: Swimming

Friedrich Wilhelm Meuring (6 June 1882 – 28 May 1973) was a Dutch freestyle swimmer who competed in the 1908 Summer Olympics. He participated in the 400 metre freestyle competition, but he was eliminated in the first round.
