= Abraham de Oliveira =

Dutch gymnast

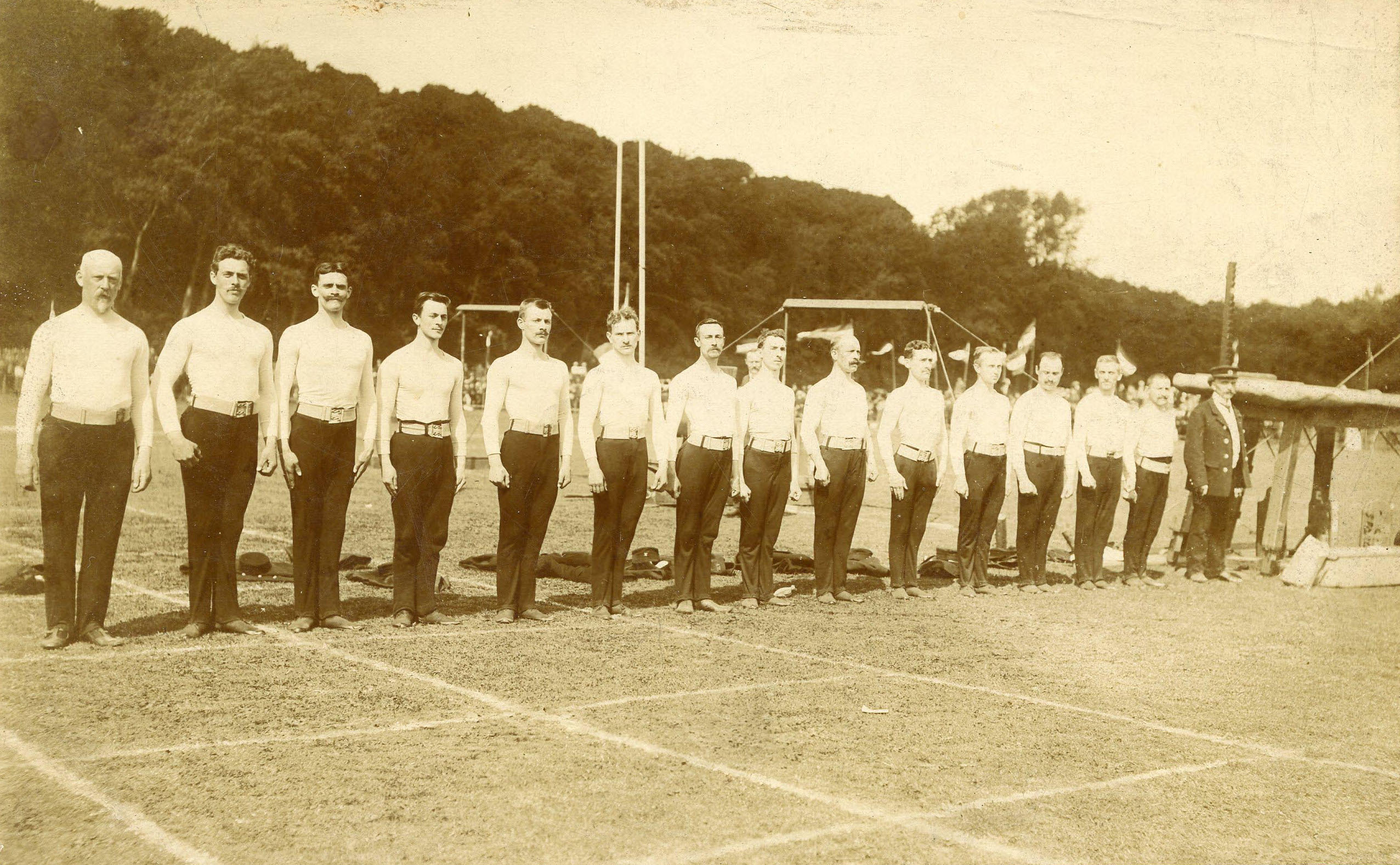
- Born: 4 May 1880 Amsterdam, Netherlands
- Died: 26 March 1943 (aged 62) Sobibor extermination camp, General Government (occupied Poland)

Gymnastics career
- Discipline: Men's artistic gymnastics
- Country represented: Netherlands

Abraham de Oliveira (4 May 1880 – 26 March 1943) was a Dutch gymnast who competed in the 1908 Summer Olympics. He was part of the Dutch gymnastics team, which finished seventh in the team event.

He was murdered in the Sobibor extermination camp.
