= George Cortlever =

Dutch swimmer

Personal information
- Born: 4 August 1885 Amsterdam, Netherlands
- Died: 14 April 1972 (aged 86) Amsterdam, Netherlands

Sport
- Sport: Swimming

Johan George Cortlever (4 August 1885 – 14 April 1972) was a Dutch backstroke swimmer and water polo player who competed in the 1908 Summer Olympics and in the 1920 Summer Olympics.

In 1908, he competed in the 100 metre backstroke competition but was eliminated in the first round.

He was part of the Dutch water polo team, which finished fourth in the 1908 tournament.

Twelve years later, he was a member of the Dutch water polo team, which finished sixth in the 1920 tournament.
