= Jonas Slier =

Dutch artistic gymnast

- Born: 22 March 1886 Amsterdam, Netherlands
- Died: 5 November 1942 (aged 56) Oświęcim, Poland

Gymnastics career
- Discipline: Men's artistic gymnastics
- Country represented: Netherlands

Jonas Slier (22 March 1886 in Amsterdam – 5 November 1942 in Auschwitz concentration camp) was a Dutch gymnast who competed in the 1908 Summer Olympics.

Jonas Slier was part of the Dutch gymnastics team, which finished seventh in the team event. In the individual all-around competition he finished 96th. There is no evidence that another Jonas Slier, the uncle of Philip Slier was the athlete mentioned above.
