= Conrad Trubenbach =

American swimmer (1882–1961)

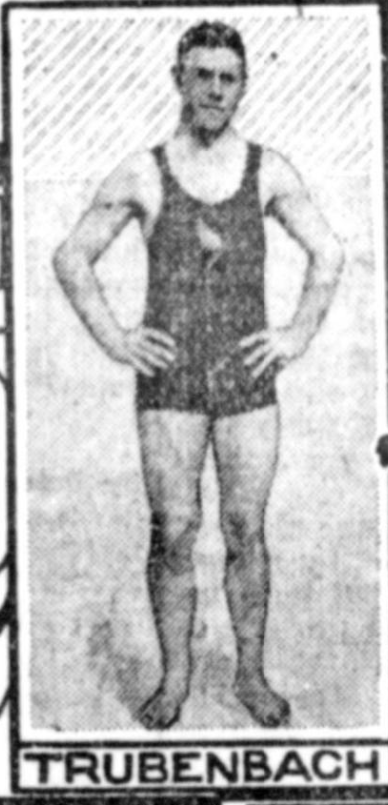
- Trubenbach circa 1906 wearing the winged foot jersey of the New York Athletic Club

Personal information
- Full name: Conrad Daniel Trubenbach
- Born: November 4, 1882 San Francisco, California, U.S.
- Died: June 30, 1961 (aged 78) New York, New York, U.S.
- Occupations: President; Perey Turnstile Company
- Spouse: Irma Louise Ams (1916)
- Children: 1 daughter

Sport
- Sport: Swimming
- Event: 50, 100, 400 meter Freestyle
- Strokes: Freestyle
- Club: New York Athletic Club
- College team: Columbia University
- Coach: Gus Sundstrom (NYAC)

Conrad Daniel Trubenbach (November 4, 1882 – June 30, 1961) was an American water polo player and swimmer, who competed for Columbia University and trained and competed with the New York Athletic Club in both sports. He participated in the 1908 London Olympics in the Men's 100 meter and 400 meter freestyle events.

== Early life ==
Trubenbach was born November 4, 1882 in San Francisco though he lived in New York city at least by his teen years. At 22, he attended a dance with his brother Edward sponsored by the Phi Mu Sorority of the recently built Wadleigh High School, one of New York's first Public Schools for girls, located at the time near New York's Harlem area. Edward, like Conrad was a member of the New York Athletic Club, and played with their water polo team. American media, particularly newspapers, have printed little about Trubenbach's early life, other than his swimming and competing with the New York Athletic Club during his college years.

== Columbia University ==
Enrolling at Columbia University around 1901, he was the IC4A swim champion for the School's swim team. The IC4A was effectively the equivalent of the National Collegiate Athletic Association (NCAA) Championship of today, and stood for the Intercollegiate Association of Amateur Athletes with the 4A designation applying to Ivy League Schools, and could include other colleges and institutions in the Northeast and Mid-Atlantic states. Today the term is used exclusively for track and field competition. While at Columbia, Trubenbach was a member of the Columbia University Club, the engineering club and Theta Delta Chi fraternity. He won two championship swimming races at an Ivy League meet in Philadelphia, in 1905, likely against fellow Ivy League teams, Princeton, Yale, and the University of Pennsylvania. The Water Polo team from Columbia defeated Yale in the finals by a score of 1-0 at the Philadelphia meet. Trubenbach lettered in swimming at Columbia, graduating in 1905 with a major in Science, later working as a civil engineer, and likely studied engineering at Columbia.

== New York Athletic Club ==
Representing the New York Athletic Club, in July, 1906, he was considered one of the leading contenders for the 50-yard event at the New York Metropolitan Swimming Championship sponsored by the New York Athletic Club at Traverse Island, New York in New Rochelle on the weekend of July 18. T.E. Kitching Jr. was a strong contender with the standing American record of 27 seconds, as well as Hester Crane and rival Leo "Bud" Goodwin, a 1904 St. Louis Olympic gold medalist. Trubenbach's future wife Irma L. Ams of Harlem, New York, would later watch Trubenbach at the meets at Travers Island sponsored by the New York Athletic Club.

C. D. Trubenbach standing at far left with NYAC Water Polo Team, 1907

Trubenbach was coached in swimming and water polo at the NYAC primarily by Hall of Fame Coach Gus Sundstrom who was a long serving coach of both sports at the club from 1885-1935. Sundstrom is shown standing in center in the photo at left, in a dark suit and tie. Sundstrom had helped lead the New York Athletic Club Water Polo team to a gold medal at the 1904 St. Louis Olympics, and had helped to develop the use of the front crawl, known as the freestyle stroke, to make it faster and more efficient. Trubenbach's freestyle technique likely reflected Sundstrom's careful coaching. Louis B. Handley, shown seated third from left with the rugby ball, would also assist in the coaching of the swimming and water polo teams. Trubenbach is shown standing at the far left in the photo at left.

Representing the New York Athletic Club on February 22, 1908, Trubenbach won the finals of a 200-yard swimming handicap race with a time of around 2:36.4 before a very large crowd at the Motorboat and Sportsmen show at Madison Square Garden in a very close finish over Toltan Tobias of New York's East Side YMCA. On February 26, 1908, when Charles Daniels broke the 800-yard record with a time of 43 seconds, swimming in a match race against Trubenbach at the Sportsmen show at Madison Square Garden.

In 1910, continuing to swim for the New York Athletic Club, he entered a 500-yard swim event with fellow NYAC swimmers, the well-known Charles M. Daniels and Leo "Bud" Goodwin. From 1905 to 1910, as noted, he regularly played for the New York AC water polo team. As a result of rough play during a game between the New York and Chicago Athletic Clubs in April, 1908 he was suspended for 90 days from water polo competition by the Amateur Athletic Association which prevented him from trying out in water polo for the 1908 Olympics. The game of water polo was rougher and played similarly to rugby in the early 1900's, and as Trubenbach often played as back, or in a defensive position, he may have been more prone to fouling other players. He was permitted, however to try out and attend the 1908 swimming trials despite his suspension from water polo.

== 1908 Olympics ==
He competed in two events at the 1908 London Olympics which consisted of the Men's 100 metres freestyle and Men's 400 metres freestyle. In the 100meter preliminaries, Trubenbach competed in heat 2 but was not selected to compete in the semi-finals and his time was not recorded. In the 100-meter freestyle final, Trubenbach's rival at the New York Athletic Club, Charlie Daniels took the gold in a close race with a time of 1:05.6, Zoltan Halmay of Hungary took the silver with a time of 1:06.2, and Harald Julin of Sweden took the bronze with a time of 1:08.0. In the 400 meter freestyle, Trubenbach placed third in the fourth preliminary heat, on July 14, 1908 and did not make the finals, nor was a record of his time retained, though it would have been over 6:16 based on the time of the second place finisher. Henry Taylor of Great Britain took the gold medal, Frank Beaurepaire took the silver with a time of 5:44.2, and Otto Scheff of Austria took the bronze with a time of 5:46.0. According to one source, Trubenbach travelled with the New York Athletic Club for the 1912 Stockholm Olympics, but did not compete.

=== Marriage ===
Irma Ams, 1916

Trubenbach was engaged to Irma Louise Ams in mid-January, 1916. The engagement was announced at the home of Irma's father Charles Ams in Harlem on 83 Hamilton Terrace. At the time, the Harlem area was a middle and upper class suburb. Irma had watched Conrad compete at the games of the New York Athletic Club at their pool at Travers Island and was a noted swimmer herself. At the time of their marriage, she was around 20, and Conrad was around 30. From a family active in the community, Irma's father Charles was President of the German Charity Ball Committee.

The couple married at St. James Lutheran Church on Madison Avenue and 73rd Street on May 24th of 1916 with seven hundred people in attendance. A reception was held at the Hotel Astor, and the couple planned to initially live in Bridgeport, Connecticut, though they lived much of their lives in Pelham, New York near New Rochelle, just 10 miles Northeast of downtown Manhattan. Conrad and Irma had a daughter, Alma, born in July, 1917, the year following their marriage.

=== Careers and avocations ===
In career pursuits, Trubenbach served as President of the Perey Turnstile Company in New York, a manufacturer of turnstiles founded in 1913, the year of Trubenbach's marriage. Trubenbach originally lived in Bridgeport, Connecticut after their marriage, near where the Perey Company had a manufacturing facility. Known for a period as the Perey Manufacturing Company, it remains known as Perey Turnstiles, based in Port Chester New York, and produces a variety of turnstiles including optical turnstiles and glasslane turnstiles. They produce turnstiles which require payment to operate. The company provides its products primarily to government agencies, sports facilities, and bases for the military. In service to the swimming community, in 1913 Trubenbach served as the Chairman on a committee to help regulate the sport of swimming among American colleges.

Trubenbach died in New York on June 30, 1961. He was predeceased by his wife Irma Ams Trubenbach who died on November 20, 1949 at the age of 56. The couple had a daughter.
