= Theo Tartakover =

Australian swimmer (1887–1977)

Personal information
- Full name: Theodore Tartakover
- Born: 11 May 1887 Hay, New South Wales, Australia
- Died: 28 November 1977 (aged 90) Manly, New South Wales, Australia

Sport
- Sport: Swimming
- Strokes: freestyle

Theodore Tartakover (11 May 1887 – 28 November 1977) was an Australian swimmer. He competed at the 1908 Summer Olympics and the 1912 Summer Olympics.
