= Davide Baiardo =

Italian swimmer

Personal information
- Born: 13 February 1888 Voltri, Italy
- Died: 28 November 1977 (aged 90)

Sport
- Sport: Swimming

Davide Baiardo (13 February 1888 – 28 November 1977) was an Italian swimmer. He competed at the 1908 Summer Olympics and the 1912 Summer Olympics.
