= Frederick Beck =

British wrestler (1883–1972)

Personal information
- Nationality: British (English)
- Born: 27 January 1883 St Luke's, London, England
- Died: 26 February 1972 (aged 89) Barnet, Enfgland

Sport
- Sport: Wrestling
- Event: Heavyweight
- Club: German Gymnastic Society, London
Medal record
Men's freestyle wrestling
Representing Great Britain
Olympic Games
Bronze medal – third place	1908 London	Middleweight

Frederick "Fred" Beck (27 January 1883 – 26 February 1972) was a British wrestler who competed in the 1908 Summer Olympics.

== Biography ==
At the 1908 Olympic Games in London, he won the bronze medal in the freestyle wrestling middleweight class.

Beck was a two-times winner of the British Wrestling Championships at heavyweight in 1905 and 1906.
