= Isidore Goudeket =

Dutch gymnast

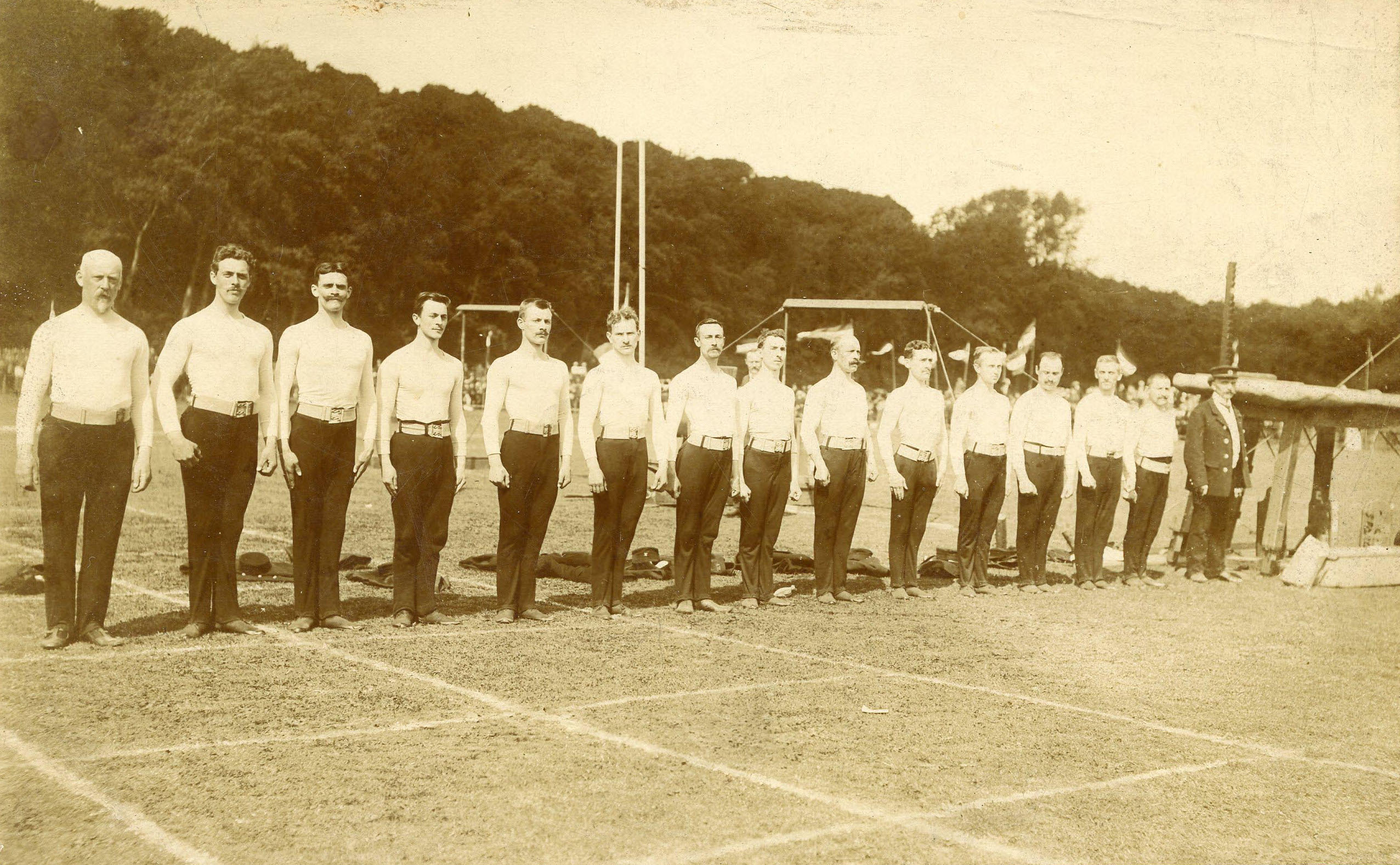
- Born: 1 August 1883 Amsterdam, Netherlands
- Died: 9 July 1943 (aged 59) Sobibór, Poland

Gymnastics career
- Discipline: Men's artistic gymnastics
- Country represented: Netherlands

Isidore Goudeket (1 August 1883 – 9 July 1943) was a Dutch gymnast who competed in the 1908 Summer Olympics. He was part of the Dutch gymnastics team, which finished seventh in the team event. In the individual all-around competition, he finished 62nd.

Goudeket died in the Sobibor extermination camp, in Poland.
