= Athletics at the 1908 Summer Olympics – Men's discus throw =

Men's discus throw at the Games of the IV Olympiad
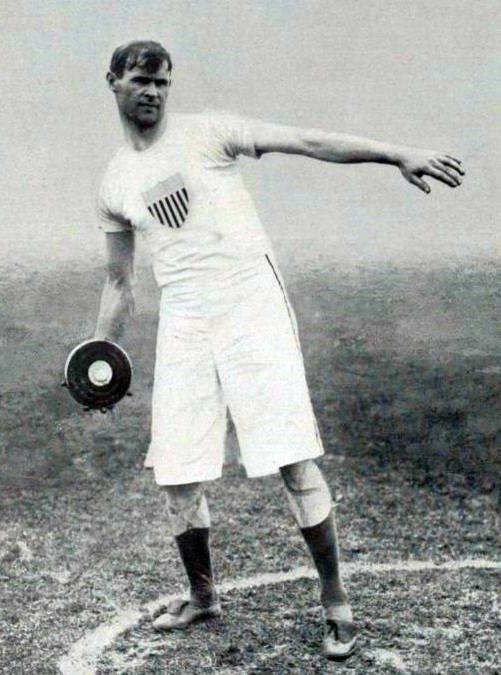
- The winner Martin Sheridan
- Venue: White City Stadium
- Date: 16 July 1908
- Competitors: 42 from 11 nations
- Winning distance: 40.89 OR

Medalists
1st place, gold medalist(s)		Martin Sheridan; United States
2nd place, silver medalist(s)		Merritt Giffin; United States
3rd place, bronze medalist(s)		Bill Horr; United States

Official Video

The men's discus throw was one of six throwing events on the Athletics at the 1908 Summer Olympics programme in London. The competition was held on 16 July 1908. 42 throwers from eleven nations competed. NOCs could enter up to 12 athletes. The event was won by Martin Sheridan of the United States, his second consecutive victory in the event (third if the 1906 Intercalated Games are included). The Americans completed their first sweep in the discus throw, with Merritt Giffin taking silver and Bill Horr bronze.

== Background ==
This was the fourth appearance of the event, which is one of 12 athletics events to have been held at every Summer Olympics. The returning competitors from 1904 were defending champion Martin Sheridan of the United States, bronze medalist Nikolaos Georgantas of Greece, and fourth-place finisher (and 1900 competitor) John Flanagan of the United States. Sheridan, who had also won the 1906 Intercalated Games discus throw, was heavily favored, "unequaled as a discus thrower."

Finland, Germany, Italy, and Norway each made their debut in the men's discus throw. Greece and the United States each made their fourth appearance, having competed in every edition of the Olympic men's discus throw to date.

== Competition format ==
The competition continued to use the single, divided-final format in use since 1896. Each athlete received three throws, with the top three receiving an additional three throws. This event was one of two discus throwing events in 1908 and was referred to as the "free style" throw; the other was throwing the discus "as at Athens." For this event, the athletes threw the discus from inside a 2.5 metre diameter circle. There were no rules on form ("The method of throwing is at the absolute discretion of each competitor"), though the thrower had to remain in the circle until the discus hit the ground. The landing area was a 45 degree sector, broader than the modern 34.92 degrees.

== Records ==
These were the standing world and Olympic records (in metres) prior to the 1908 Summer Olympics.

World record	Wilhelm Dörr (GER)	43.86^{*}	Worms, German Empire	1907
Olympic record	Ralph Rose (USA); Martin Sheridan (USA)	39.28	St. Louis, United States	3 September 1904

^{*} unofficial

The top four men all threw beyond the old Olympic record in the qualifying throws. Martin Sheridan finished with the best throw and the new record, at 40.89 metres.

== Results ==
Giffin's first throw (40.70 metres) was his best and gave him the lead until the final round. Sheridan threw 40.89 metres on his final attempt to win. 23 athletes did not start.

Rank	Athlete	Nation	Qualifying	Final	Distance	Notes
1st place, gold medalist(s)	Martin Sheridan	United States	40.58	40.89 OR	40.89	OR
2nd place, silver medalist(s)	Merritt Giffin	United States	40.70 OR	Unknown	40.70	
3rd place, bronze medalist(s)	Bill Horr	United States	39.44	39.45	39.45	
4	Verner Järvinen	Finland	39.43	Did not advance	39.43	
5	Arthur Dearborn	United States	38.52	Did not advance	38.52	
6	Lee Talbott	United States	38.40	Did not advance	38.40	
7	György Luntzer	Hungary	38.34	Did not advance	38.34	
8	André Tison	France	38.30	Did not advance	38.30	
9	John Flanagan	United States	37.80	Did not advance	37.80	
10	Wilbur Burroughs	United States	37.43	Did not advance	37.43	
11	Emil Welz	Germany	37.02	Did not advance	37.02	
12–42	Mór Kóczán	Hungary	32.76	Did not advance	32.76	
12–42	Ferenc Jesina	Hungary	30.82	Did not advance	30.82	
12–42	Platt Adams	United States	Unknown	Did not advance	Unknown	
12–42	Umberto Avattaneo	Italy	Unknown	Did not advance	Unknown	
12–42	Edward Barrett	Great Britain	Unknown	Did not advance	Unknown	
12–42	Michael Collins	Great Britain	Unknown	Did not advance	Unknown	
12–42	Michalis Dorizas	Greece	Unknown	Did not advance	Unknown	
12–42	John Falchenberg	Norway	Unknown	Did not advance	Unknown	
12–42	Alfred Flaxman	Great Britain	Unknown	Did not advance	Unknown	
12–42	Folke Fleetwood	Sweden	Unknown	Did not advance	Unknown	
12–42	John Garrels	United States	Unknown	Did not advance	Unknown	
12–42	Nikolaos Georgantas	Greece	Unknown	Did not advance	Unknown	
12–42	Simon Gillis	United States	Unknown	Did not advance	Unknown	
12–42	Walter Henderson	Great Britain	Unknown	Did not advance	Unknown	
12–42	Imre Mudin	Hungary	Unknown	Did not advance	Unknown	
12–42	Charles Lagarde	France	Unknown	Did not advance	Unknown	
12–42	Henry Leeke	Great Britain	Unknown	Did not advance	Unknown	
12–42	Eric Lemming	Sweden	Unknown	Did not advance	Unknown	
12–42	Ernest May	Great Britain	Unknown	Did not advance	Unknown	
12–42	John Murray	Great Britain	Unknown	Did not advance	Unknown	
12–42	Theodor Neijström	Sweden	Unknown	Did not advance	Unknown	
12–42	Elmer Niklander	Finland	Unknown	Did not advance	Unknown	
12–42	Otto Nilsson	Sweden	Unknown	Did not advance	Unknown	
12–42	Lauri Pihkala	Finland	Unknown	Did not advance	Unknown	
12–42	Aarne Salovaara	Finland	Unknown	Did not advance	Unknown	
12–42	Jalmari Sauli	Finland	Unknown	Did not advance	Unknown	
12–42	František Souček	Bohemia	Unknown	Did not advance	Unknown	
12–42	Miroslav Šustera	Bohemia	Unknown	Did not advance	Unknown	
12–42	Ludwig Uettwiller	Germany	Unknown	Did not advance	Unknown	
12–42	Hugo Wieslander	Sweden	Unknown	Did not advance	Unknown	
12–42	Lauri Wilskman	Finland	Unknown	Did not advance	Unknown	

== Sources ==
- Official Report of the Games of the IV Olympiad (1908).
- De Wael, Herman. Herman's Full Olympians: "Athletics 1908". Accessed 7 April 2006. Available electronically at.
