= Athletics at the 1908 Summer Olympics – Men's shot put =

Men's shot put at the Games of the IV Olympiad
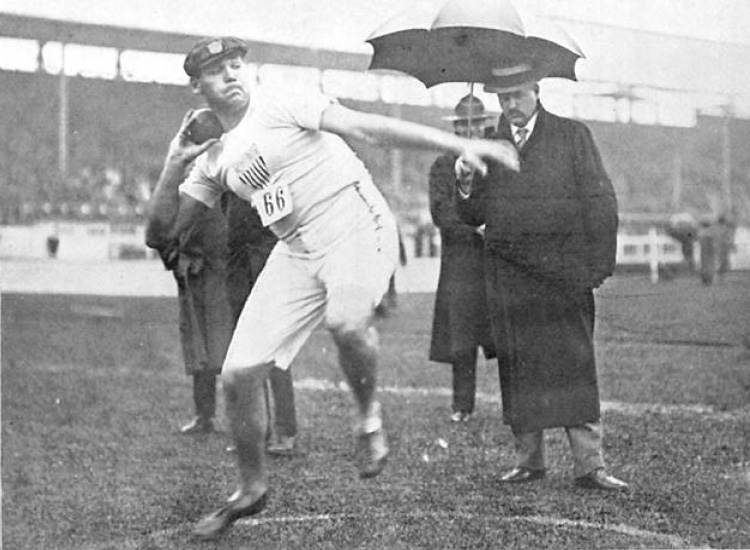
- The winner Ralph Rose
- Venue: White City Stadium
- Date: July 16, 1908
- Competitors: 25 from 8 nations
- Winning distance: 14.21

Medalists
1st place, gold medalist(s)		Ralph Rose; United States
2nd place, silver medalist(s)		Denis Horgan; Great Britain
3rd place, bronze medalist(s)		John Garrels; United States

The men's shot put was one of six throwing events on the Athletics at the 1908 Summer Olympics programme in London. The competition was held on July 16, 1908. 25 shot putters from eight nations competed. NOCs could enter up to 12 athletes. The event was won by Ralph Rose, successfully defending his title from 1904 and making it four consecutive Games that the event was won by an American. The two-Games streak of sweeps in 1900 and 1904 ended, however, as Denis Horgan of Great Britain took silver. Johnny Garrels of the United States took bronze. Rose was the second man to win two medals in the shot put (and the first to win two golds); Wesley Coe nearly was the third as he ended up in 4th place, only 11 centimetres behind Garrels.

== Background ==
This was the fourth appearance of the event, which is one of 12 athletics events to have been held at every Summer Olympics. Three Americans returned from the 1904 Games: gold medalist Ralph Rose, silver medalist Wesley Coe, and fourth-place finisher Martin Sheridan. Sheridan was best at the discus, but had won the shot put at the 1906 Intercalated Games (and was also an accomplished standing jumper). Irishman Denis Horgan, one of the best shot putters in the world over the past decade and a half, finally competed in the Olympics after not participating in prior Games. Horgan was 37 years old; still a strong contender (he would continue winning AAA championships until 1912), but unable to compete with Rose in his 23-year-old prime.

Finland, France, Great Britain, and Norway made their debut in the men's shot put. Greece and the United States each appeared for the fourth time, having competed in all Olympic shot put competitions to date.

== Competition format ==
The competition returned to the two-round format of 1900, with results carrying over between rounds. Each athlete received three throws in the qualifying round. The top three men advanced to the final, where they received an additional three throws. The best result, qualifying or final, counted. The throw itself was largely under modern rules (16 pound weight, 7 foot circle), but no toe board was used.

== Records ==
These were the standing world and Olympic records (in metres) prior to the 1908 Summer Olympics.

World record	Ralph Rose (USA)^{*}	15.12	Montreal, Canada	21 September 1907
Olympic record	Ralph Rose (USA)	14.81	St. Louis, United States	31 August 1904

^{*} unofficial

No new world or Olympic records were set during the competition.

== Schedule ==
Date	Time	Round
Wednesday, 22 July 1908	14:30	Qualifying; Final

== Results ==
Distances and placement are known only for the top eight. Sequences are not known.

Rank	Athlete	Nation	Distance		
Rank	Athlete	Nation	Qualifier	Final	Best
1st place, gold medalist(s)	Ralph Rose	United States	14.08	14.21	14.21
2nd place, silver medalist(s)	Denis Horgan	Great Britain	13.33	13.62	13.62
3rd place, bronze medalist(s)	John Garrels	United States	13.18	Unknown	13.18
4	Wesley Coe	United States	13.07	Did not advance	13.07
5	Edward Barrett	Great Britain	12.89	Did not advance	12.89
6	Bill Horr	United States	12.83	Did not advance	12.83
7	Jalmari Sauli	Finland	12.58	Did not advance	12.58
8	Lee Talbott	United States	11.63	Did not advance	11.63
9–25	James Barrett	Great Britain	Unknown	Did not advance	Unknown
9–25	Wilbur Burroughs	United States	Unknown	Did not advance	Unknown
9–25	Michalis Dorizas	Greece	Unknown	Did not advance	Unknown
9–25	Nikolaos Georgantas	Greece	Unknown	Did not advance	Unknown
9–25	Juho Halme	Finland	Unknown	Did not advance	Unknown
9–25	Arne Halse	Norway	Unknown	Did not advance	Unknown
9–25	István Mudin	Hungary	Unknown	Did not advance	Unknown
9–25	Verner Järvinen	Finland	Unknown	Did not advance	Unknown
9–25	Charles Lagarde	France	Unknown	Did not advance	Unknown
9–25	Henry Alan Leeke	Great Britain	Unknown	Did not advance	Unknown
9–25	Mór Kóczán	Hungary	Unknown	Did not advance	Unknown
9–25	Tom Nicolson	Great Britain	Unknown	Did not advance	Unknown
9–25	Elmer Niklander	Finland	Unknown	Did not advance	Unknown
9–25	Martin Sheridan	United States	Unknown	Did not advance	Unknown
9–25	André Tison	France	Unknown	Did not advance	Unknown
9–25	Hugo Wieslander	Sweden	Unknown	Did not advance	Unknown
9–25	Bruno Zilliacus	Finland	Unknown	Did not advance	Unknown

== Sources ==
- Official Report of the Games of the IV Olympiad (1908).
- De Wael, Herman. Herman's Full Olympians: "Athletics 1908". Accessed 7 April 2006. Available electronically at.
