= Athletics at the 1912 Summer Olympics – Men's discus throw =

Men's discus throw at the Games of the V Olympiad
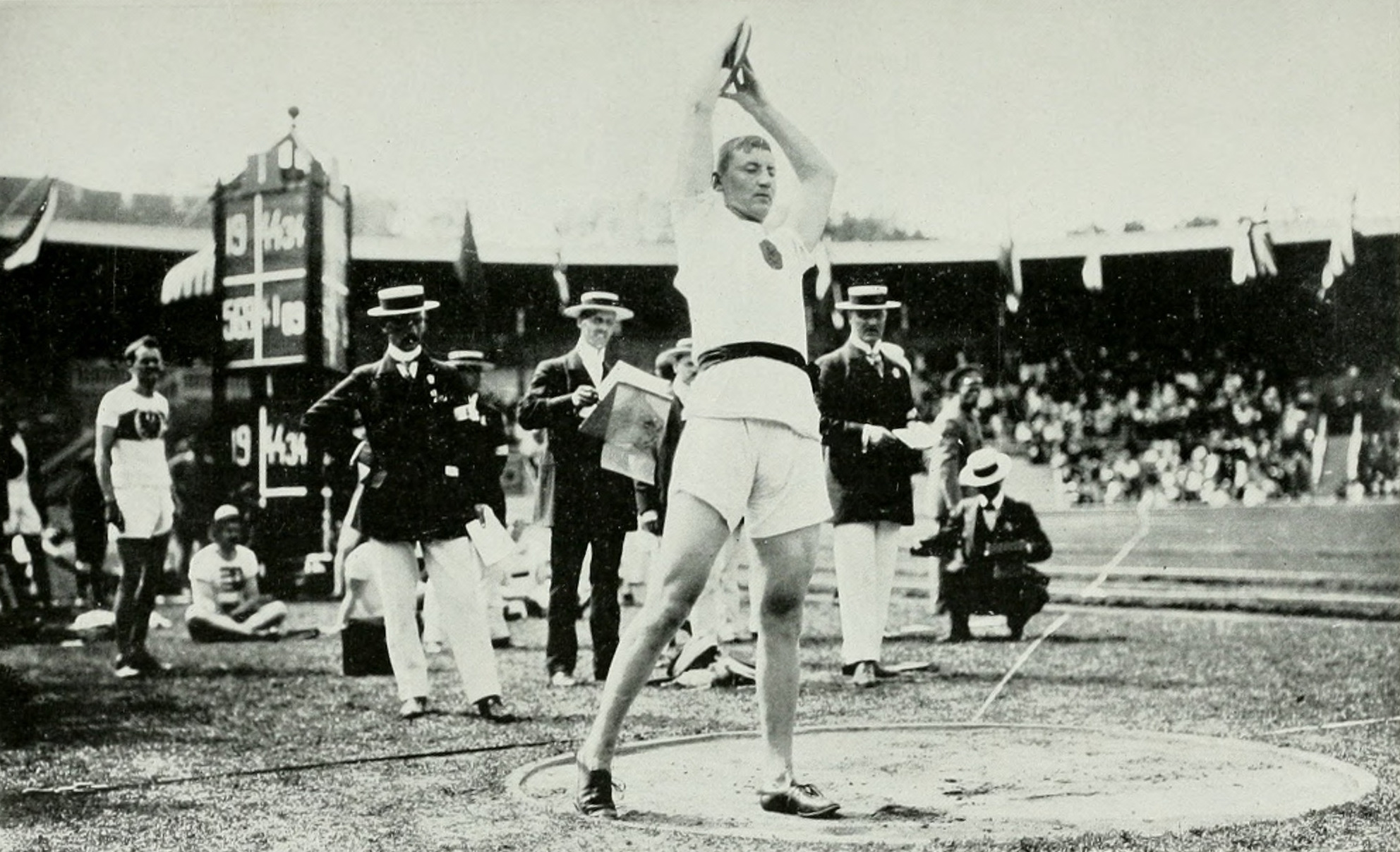
- Taipale on the way to win the gold medal.
- Venue: Stockholm Olympic Stadium
- Date: July 12, 1912
- Competitors: 41 from 15 nations
- Winning time: 45.21 OR

Medalists
1st place, gold medalist(s)		Armas Taipale; Finland
2nd place, silver medalist(s)		Richard Byrd; United States
3rd place, bronze medalist(s)		James Duncan; United States

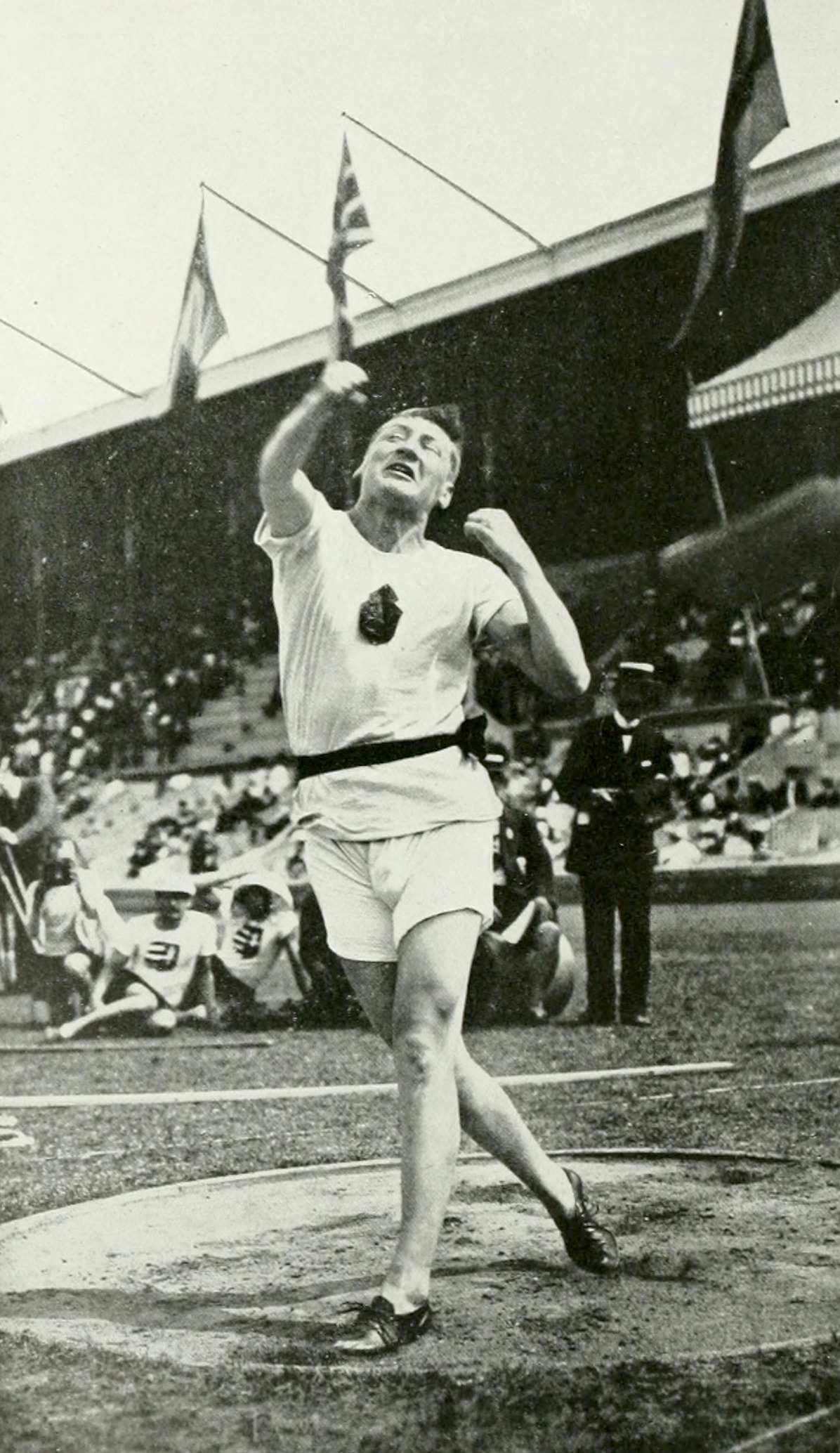
Armas Taipale in action.

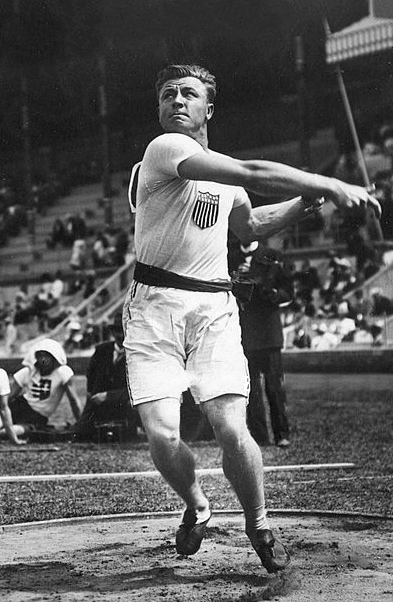
Silver medalist Richard Byrd.

The men's discus throw was a track and field athletics event held as part of the athletics at the 1912 Summer Olympics programme. The competition was held on Friday, July 12, 1912. Forty-one discus throwers from 15 nation competed. NOCs could enter up to 12 athletes. The event was won by Armas Taipale of Finland, the nation's first medal in the men's discus throw. Richard Byrd took silver and James Duncan took bronze to continue the United States' podium streak at five consecutive Games.

== Background ==
This was the fifth appearance of the event, which is one of 12 athletics events to have been held at every Summer Olympics. Returning competitors from 1908 included fourth-place finisher Verner Järvinen of Finland, seventh-place finisher György Luntzer of Hungary, eighth-place finisher André Tison of France, and eleventh-place finisher Emil Welz of Germany. Multiple gold medalist Martin Sheridan of the United States had retired in 1911, leaving the competition "wide-open."

Canada, Luxembourg, Russia, and Turkey each made their debut in the men's discus throw. Greece and the United States each made their fifth appearance, having competed in every edition of the Olympic men's discus throw to date.

== Competition format ==
The competition continued to use the single, divided-final format in use since 1896. Each athlete received three throws, with the top three receiving an additional three throws. Ties were broken by an additional throw. The landing area was a 90 degree sector.

== Records ==
These were the standing world and Olympic records (in metres) prior to the 1912 Summer Olympics.

World record	James Duncan (USA)	47.58	New York, United States	27 May 1912
Olympic record	Martin Sheridan (USA)	40.89	London, Great Britain	16 July 1908

Armas Taipale ended the competition with the new Olympic record at 45.21 metres, with seven men bettering the old record.

== Schedule ==
Date	Time	Round
Friday, 12 July 1912		Qualifying; Final

== Results ==
No fewer than seven throwers beat the old Olympic record of 40.89 metres, beginning with Duncan and Niklander's first throws. Niklander's was the best of the round. The second throw resulted in Mucks joining those who beat the old record, while Taipale, Byrd, and Duncan beat even the new one, with Taipale's 43.91 metres setting a mark no other thrower would reach. Philbrook and Tronner beat the old record in the third throw, but neither was able to break into the top three. Niklander, after his first throw, was unable to make another legal mark and fell to fourth, where he finished.

In the final, Byrd and Duncan were unable to improve upon their previous marks, throwing shorter in their first throws and scratching in their second and third throws each. Taipale, on the other hand, regardless of the safety of his lead, threw even further in his first and then his third throw, finishing at 45.21 metres, nearly 3 metres ahead of Byrd.

Rank	Athlete	Nation	1	2	3	4	5	6	Distance	Notes
1st place, gold medalist(s)	Armas Taipale	Finland	36.94	43.91 OR	X	44.34 OR	X	45.21 OR	45.21	OR
2nd place, silver medalist(s)	Richard Byrd	United States	37.48	42.32	X	41.09	X	—	42.32	
3rd place, bronze medalist(s)	James Duncan	United States	41.61	42.28	X	41.33	X	—	42.28	
4	Elmer Niklander	Finland	42.09 OR	X	—	Did not advance			42.09	
5	Hans Tronner	Austria	39.97	X	41.24	Did not advance			41.24	
6	Arlie Mucks	United States	40.54	40.93	X	Did not advance			40.93	
7	George Philbrook	United States	38.14	38.55	40.92	Did not advance			40.92	
8	Emil Magnusson	Sweden	39.91	X	—	Did not advance			39.91	
9	Rezsõ Újlaki	Hungary	39.82	X	—	Did not advance			39.82	
10	Einar Nilsson	Sweden	37.26	38.77	39.69	Did not advance			39.69	
11	Ralph Rose	United States	37.24	38.82	39.65	Did not advance			39.65	
12	Emil Muller	United States	37.91	38.69	39.35	Did not advance			39.35	
13	Michalis Dorizas	Greece	X	39.28	X	Did not advance			39.28	
14	Duncan Gillis	Canada	39.01	X	—	Did not advance			39.01	
15	Verner Järvinen	Finland	34.15	38.60	X	Did not advance			38.60	
16	Josef Waitzer	Germany	38.44	X	—	Did not advance			38.44	
17	František Janda-Suk	Bohemia	32.41	36.83	38.31	Did not advance			38.31	
18	Aurelio Lenzi	Italy	35.58	38.19	X	Did not advance			38.19	
19	Károly Kobulszky	Hungary	37.81	38.15	X	Did not advance			38.15	
20	Lawrence Whitney	United States	34.87	37.91	X	Did not advance			37.91	
21	György Luntzer	Hungary	37.88	X	—	Did not advance			37.88	
22	Avery Brundage	United States	37.48	37.85	X	Did not advance			37.85	
23	Gunnar Nilsson	Sweden	X	37.44	X	Did not advance			37.44	
24	Emil Welz	Germany	36.16	37.24	X	Did not advance			37.24	
25	Samu Fóti	Hungary	35.51	X	36.37	Did not advance			36.37	
26	Gunnar Bolander	Sweden	X	36.22	X	Did not advance			36.22	
27	Carl Johan Lind	Sweden	X	35.04	36.07	Did not advance			36.07	
28	Folke Fleetwood	Sweden	32.09	32.89	35.06	Did not advance			35.06	
29	Josef Schäffer	Austria	X	34.87	X	Did not advance			34.87	
30	André Tison	France	34.73	X	—	Did not advance			34.73	
31	Marcel Pelletier	Luxembourg	33.73	X	—	Did not advance			33.73	
32	Walter Henderson	Great Britain	X	33.61	X	Did not advance			33.61	
33	Mór Kóczán	Hungary	33.30	X	—	Did not advance			33.30	
34	Mgirdiç Migiryan	Turkey	X	—	32.98	Did not advance			32.98	
35	Nikolay Neklepayev	Russia	32.59	X	—	Did not advance			32.59	
36	Charles Lagarde	France	30.76	X	32.35	Did not advance			32.35	
37	Henning Möller	Sweden	X	32.23	X	Did not advance			32.23	
38	Miroslav Šustera	Bohemia	31.83	X	—	Did not advance			31.83	
39	Ēriks Vanags	Russia	X	31.34	X	Did not advance			31.34	
40	Otto Nilsson	Sweden	31.07	X	—	Did not advance			31.07	
41	Paul Willführ	Germany	X	—	X	Did not advance			No mark	

There were 32 non-starters.

== Sources ==
- Bergvall, Erik, ed. (1913). The Official Report of the Olympic Games of Stockholm 1912. Translated by Adams-Ray, Edward. Stockholm: Wahlström & Widstrand.
- Wudarski, Pawel (1999). "Wyniki Igrzysk Olimpijskich" (in Polish).
