= Lauri Wilskman =

Finnish athletics competitor

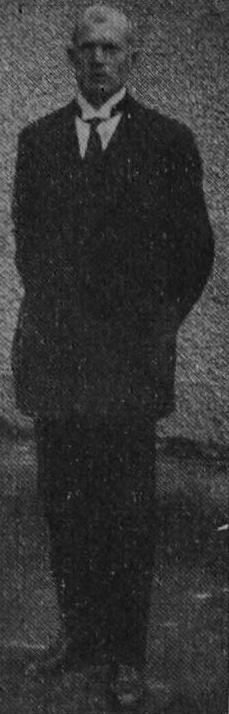
- Lauri Wilskman in 1915

Personal information
- Full name: Lauri Wilskman
- National team: Finland
- Born: 14 May 1887 Vyborg, Grand Duchy of Finland, Russian Empire
- Died: 25 November 1937 (aged 50) Nurmijärvi, Finland
- Resting place: Tammisto cemetery, Vyborg
- Occupation: Forester
- Spouse: Ilme Seppälä

Sport
- Sport: Track and field
- Events: High jump; Discus throw
- Club: Viipurin Reipas; Viipurin Akateemiset Urheilijat

Achievements and titles
- Personal bests: High jump: 174 cm (1908); Discus throw: 40.24 m (1915)

Lauri Wilskman (14 May 1887 – 25 November 1937) was a Finnish track and field athlete who competed at the 1908 Summer Olympics.

== Athletics ==
Lauri Wilskman at the Olympic Games
Games	Event	Rank	Result	Notes
1908 Summer Olympics	Discus throw	12th–42nd	unknown	Source:
1908 Summer Olympics	High jump	Did not start		His qualification result was 5 feet 6 inches (168 cm). However, due to changing conditions, his qualification pool was declared void and to be re-jumped. He did not start the re-jump.
1908 Summer Olympics	Shot put	Did not start		Source:
1908 Summer Olympics	Greek discus throw	Did not start		Source:

He was a founding member and chairman of the club Viipurin Akateemiset Urheilijat, and also represented the club Viipurin Reipas.

== Other ==
He was born to father hovioikeudenneuvos Oscar Waldemar Wilskman (1851–1918) and mother Hanna Augusta Svahn (1861–1932) in Vyborg in 1887. He married Ilme Seppälä in 1916. Their daughter Liisa Ester Vaartaja married Eino Hirva in 1940.

He and Ivar Wilskman were first cousins once removed.

Wilskman graduated as a forester in 1911 and worked in forestry uuntilhis death.

Wilskman fought in the Finnish Civil War.

Wilskman died in Nurmijärvi in 1937.
