= Athletics at the 1912 Summer Olympics – Men's shot put =

Men's shot put at the Games of the V Olympiad
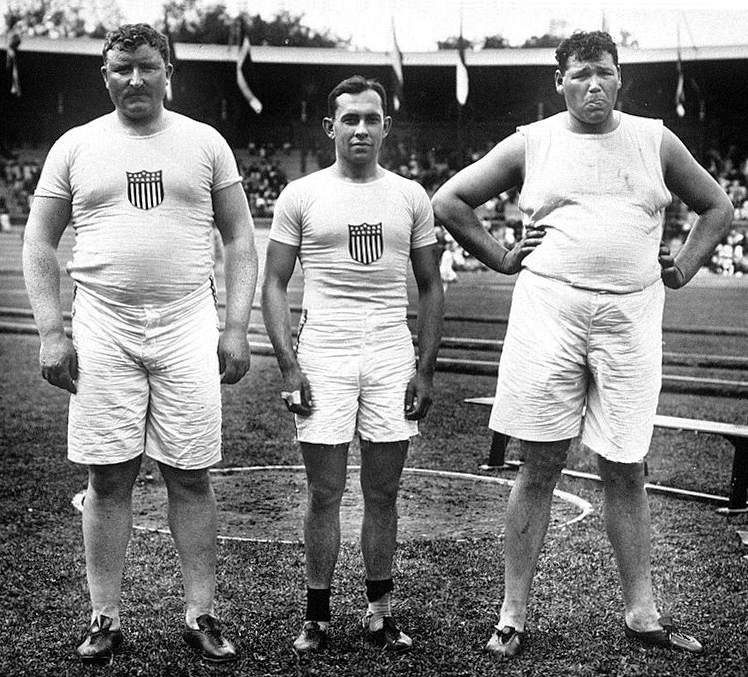
- Left-right: Pat McDonald, Lawrence Whitney, Ralph Rose
- Venue: Stockholm Olympic Stadium
- Date: July 10, 1912
- Competitors: 22 from 14 nations
- Winning distance: 15.34 OR

Medalists
1st place, gold medalist(s)		Pat McDonald; United States
2nd place, silver medalist(s)		Ralph Rose; United States
3rd place, bronze medalist(s)		Lawrence Whitney; United States

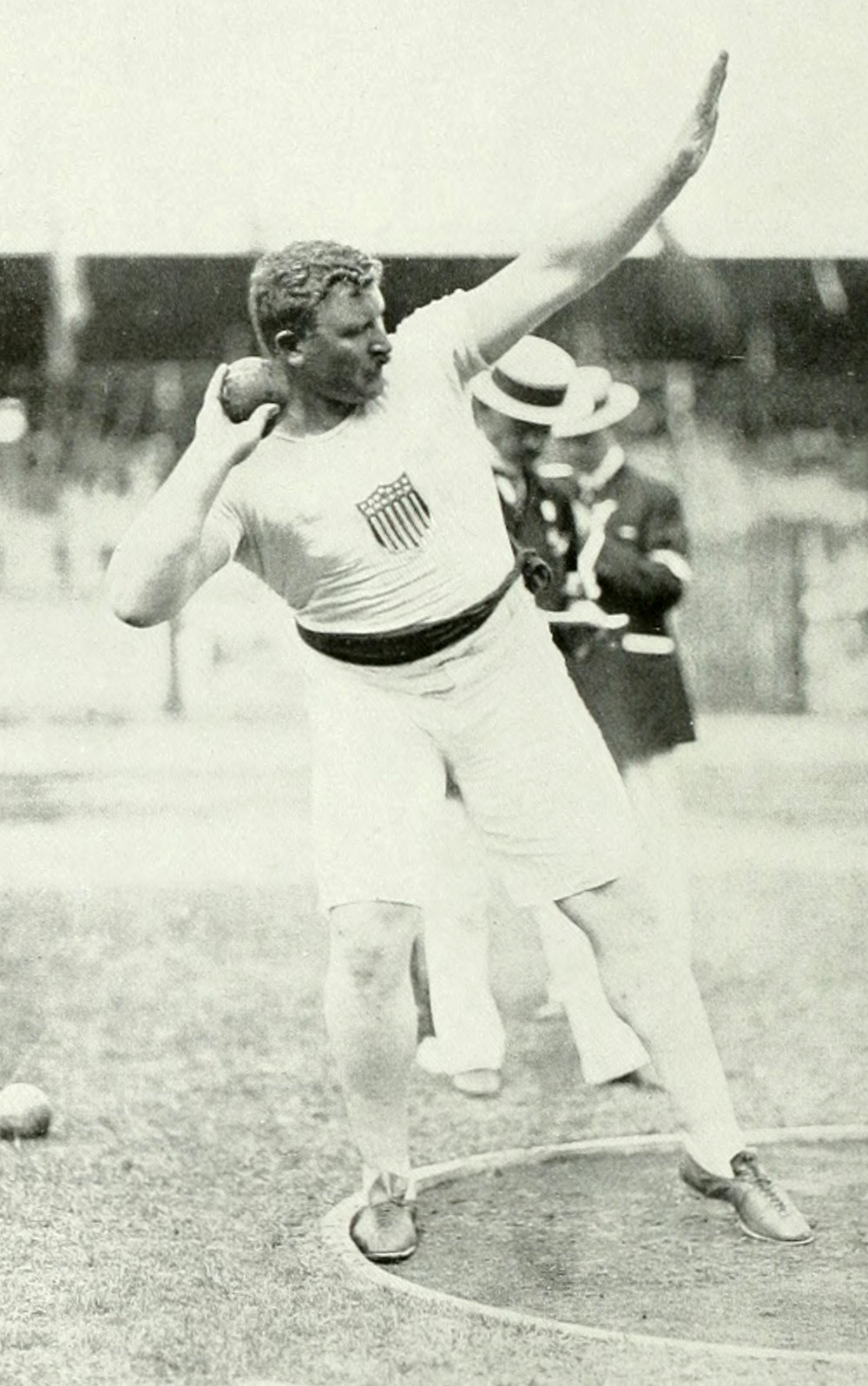
Pat McDonald on the way to winning the gold medal.

The men's shot put was a track and field athletics event held as part of the athletics at the 1912 Summer Olympics programme. The competition was held on Wednesday, July 10, 1912. Twenty-two shot putters from 14 nations competed. NOCs could enter up to 12 athletes. The event was won by Pat McDonald of the United States, the nation's fifth consecutive victory in the men's shot put. The American team swept the top three places, the third time in five Games (1900, 1904). Ralph Rose took silver, 9 centimetres shy of a third gold medal; he became the first man to win three medals of any color (through the 2016 Games, matched only by Parry O'Brien).

== Background ==
This was the fifth appearance of the event, which is one of 12 athletics events to have been held at every Summer Olympics. Two-time Olympic champion Ralph Rose returned after competing in 1904 and 1908; other 1908 competitors that returned in 1912 were Michalis Dorizas of Greece, Charles Lagarde and André Tison of France, and Elmer Niklander of Finland. Rose had been dominant from 1904 through 1910, but countryman Pat McDonald had beaten him in the AAU championships in 1911 and 1912. The Olympic competition was expected to be a match between the two, with everyone else vying for third.

Austria, Bohemia, Italy, Luxembourg, Russia, and Turkey made their debut in the men's shot put. Greece and the United States each appeared for the fifth time, having competed in all Olympic shot put competitions to date.

== Competition format ==
The competition continued to use the two-round format used in 1900 and 1908, with results carrying over between rounds. Each athlete received three throws in the qualifying round. The top three men advanced to the final, where they received an additional three throws. The best result, qualifying or final, counted.

== Records ==
These were the standing world and Olympic records (in metres) prior to the 1912 Summer Olympics.

World record	Ralph Rose (USA)	15.54	San Francisco, United States	21 August 1909
Olympic record	Ralph Rose (USA)	14.81	St. Louis, United States	31 August 1904

== Schedule ==
Date	Time	Round
Friday, 12 July 1912	14:00	Qualifying; Final

== Results ==
Ralph Rose, the two-time defending Olympic champion and holder of the Olympic record (14.81 metres, set at the 1904 Summer Olympics), was unseated by Pat McDonald after a colossal throw in the final. Rose bettered his own record with his first throw, coming just shy of 15 metres. With his third throw, Rose again topped himself, heaving the shot 15.25 metres while none of the other competitors had yet matched his first throw. At the end of the preliminaries, Rose's 15.25 stood well above McDonald's 14.78 metres and Lawrence Whitney's 13.93 metres.

Each of the three finalists received three more throws for the finals, but only two out of the combined 9 throws were legal marks. Whitney, who had scratched twice in the preliminaries, did so three more times to make his 13.93 metres the only legal throw of his 6. Rose's first throw in the finals was measured at 14.96 metres, giving him three throws that were better than the old record. McDonald, however, launched his first throw fully 15.34 metres to take the record and the gold medal after none of the three throwers could make a legal mark in their second or third throws.

Rank	Athlete	Nation	1	2	3	4	5	6	Distance	Notes
1st place, gold medalist(s)	Pat McDonald	United States	14.54	14.27	14.78	15.34 OR	X	X	15.34	OR
2nd place, silver medalist(s)	Ralph Rose	United States	14.98 OR	14.68	15.25 OR	14.96	X	X	15.25	
3rd place, bronze medalist(s)	Lawrence Whitney	United States	X	X	13.93	X	X	X	13.93	
4	Elmer Niklander	Finland	13.52	X	13.65	Did not advance			13.65	
5	George Philbrook	United States	12.84	13.13	X	Did not advance			13.13	
6	Imre Mudin	Hungary	Unknown			Did not advance			12.81	
7	Einar Nilsson	Sweden	12.18	X	12.62	Did not advance			12.62	
8	Patrick Quinn	Great Britain	Unknown			Did not advance			12.53	
9	André Tison	France	X	11.74	12.41	Did not advance			12.41	
10	Paavo Aho	Finland	Unknown			Did not advance			12.40	
11	Michalis Dorizas	Greece	Unknown			Did not advance			12.05	
12	Aurelio Lenzi	Italy	10.52	11.25	11.57	Did not advance			11.57	
13	Josef Schäffer	Austria	11.44	X	X	Did not advance			11.44	
14	Karl Halt	Germany	Unknown			Did not advance			11.16	
15	František Janda-Suk	Bohemia	Unknown			Did not advance			11.15	
16	Raoul Paoli	France	9.81	10.61	11.11	Did not advance			11.11	
17	Marcel Pelletier	Luxembourg	10.68	11.04	X	Did not advance			11.04	
18	Paul Willführ	Germany	X	X	10.90	Did not advance			10.90	
19	Mgirdiç Migiryan	Turkey	10.33	X	10.63	Did not advance			10.63	
20	Ēriks Vanags	Russia	X	X	10.44	Did not advance			10.44	
21	Arvīds Ozols-Bernē	Russia	X	10.33	X	Did not advance			10.33	
22	Charles Lagarde	France	9.41	X	X	Did not advance			9.41	

== Sources ==
- Bergvall, Erik, ed. (1913). The Official Report of the Olympic Games of Stockholm 1912. Translated by Adams-Ray, Edward. Stockholm: Wahlström & Widstrand.
- Wudarski, Pawel (1999). "Wyniki Igrzysk Olimpijskich" (in Polish).
