= John Garrels =

American athlete (1885–1956)

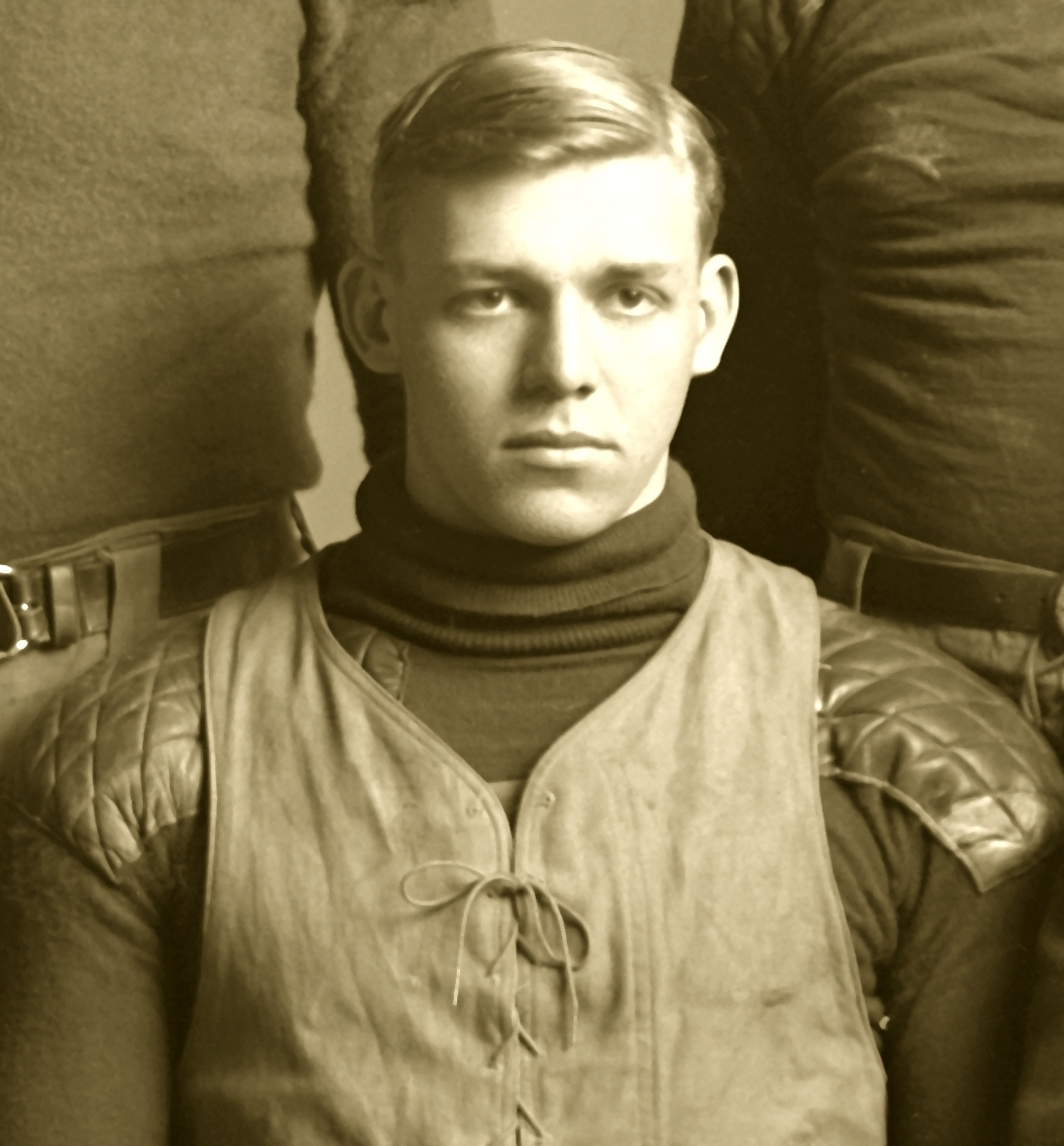

Profile
- Positions: End, Fullback

Personal information
- Born: November 18, 1885; Bay City, Michigan, U.S.
- Died: October 21, 1956 (aged 70); Grosse Ile Township, Michigan, U.S.
- Listed height: 6 ft 1 in (1.85 m)
- Listed weight: 196 lb (89 kg)

Career information
- High school: Central High School (Detroit, MI)
- College: Michigan

Career history
- 1904–1906: University of Michigan (football)
- 1904–1907: University of Michigan (track)
- 1907–1908: Chicago Athletic Association
- 1908: U.S. Olympic team

Awards and highlights
- 2× National champion (1903, 1904); Third-team All-American (1906); First-team All-Western (1906)

John Garrels
Medal record

Men's athletics

Representing the United States

Olympic Games
Silver medal – second place	1908 London	110 m hurdles
Bronze medal – third place	1908 London	Shot put

John Carlyle Garrels (November 18, 1885 – October 21, 1956) was an American athlete who excelled in the 110 metres hurdles, discus throw, shot put, and as a fullback and end in American football.

Garrels won the silver medal in the men's 110 metres hurdles and a bronze medal in the shot put at the 1908 Summer Olympics in London. On at least four occasions, he broke world records in the discus throw and 110 metres hurdles, though the Amateur Athletic Union declined to recognize the record on each occasion. He was also a starting left end and fullback for the 1904, 1905, and 1906 Michigan Wolverines football teams.

In 1911, the famed trainer and U.S. Olympic track and field coach Mike Murphy rated Garrels as one of the four athletes in the preceding 30 years "who towered head and shoulders above any other athletes of their time." In 1932, Keene Fitzpatrick, who trained multiple Olympic gold medalists, called Garrels the best all-around athlete he ever handled.

After retiring from athletics, Garrels worked as a chemical engineer. He was a technical director at Wyandotte Chemical Company for 27 years. He died in 1956 at Grosse Ile Township, Michigan.

== Early life ==
Garrels was born in Bay City, Michigan in 1885. His father was a printer. He attended Central High School in Detroit, Michigan, serving as class president.

In March 1903, Garrels won the all-round indoor championship of the YMCA at a meet held in Detroit. At age 17, Garrels scored 21 points at the meet with first place finishes in the fence vault (6 feet, 9 inches), running high kick (9 feet), hop, step and jump (27 feet, 5 inches), and second place finishes in the shot put and running high jump.

== University of Michigan ==
Garrels enrolled at the University of Michigan in 1903 and received a degree in chemical engineering in 1907. While attending Michigan, Garrels became one of the most accomplished athletes in the university's history. He excelled as a member of Michigan's football teams from 1904 to 1906 and as a member of its track and field team from 1904 to 1907. He was also a member of the Tau Beta Pi fraternity and the Michigamua and Vulcan societies at Michigan.

=== Track and field ===
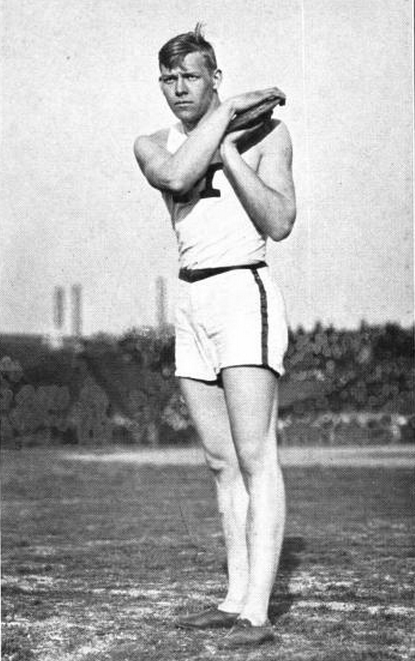
Garrels holding discus

In April 1904, Garrels, while still a freshman, demonstrated his ability by throwing the discus "around 118 and 119 feet"—a distance that would have won the event at the prior week's Philadelphia meet. Garrels announced at the time that he intended to make a specialty of the discus throw.

In April 1905, while competing at a meet in Philadelphia, Garrels threw the discus a distance of 135 feet and one-half inch, which exceeded the established world record of 128 feet, 10-1/2 inches. However, AAU officials ruled that the discus used by Garrels "did not comply strictly with AAU regulations." (The discus used by Garrels had an aluminum rim but complied with the regulations in all other respects.) Two months later, when Garrels competed at the Western Conference track meet in Chicago, he took care to ensure that the discus he used complied with all regulations in the opinion of the officials present at the meet. At that meet, Garrels threw the discus 140 feet, 2-3/8 inches, shattering the old world record by nearly 12 feet. Officials at the meet listed the toss as a new world record, but AAU officials again rejected the record, contending that "the discus used was not constructed on the official lines laid down by the A.A.U." The Detroit Free Press wrote that the AAU was a "discredited" organization and led its coverage of the ruling with a headline declaring, "GARRELS AGAIN ROBBED OF HONORS, A.A.U. REFUSING WORLD'S RECORD."

At the Western Conference meet in June 1906, Garrels won 18 points -- "more than any whole college team outside of Michigan and Chicago." At the 1906 conference meet, Garrels equaled the world's record in the 120-yard hurdles, but AAU officials ruled that his time would not qualify for the world record, as he had displaced two hurdles during the race. Under the AAU rules in effect at the time, all hurdles must be standing at the end of the race. Garrels' time did qualify, however, as a new Western Conference record. Following the 1906 conference meet, Garrels was elected captain of the 1907 track team.

At the 1907 Eastern Intercollegiate meet in Cambridge, Massachusetts, Garrels scored 13 points by winning the high hurdles in world record time (15-1/5 seconds) and also winning the low hurdles (24 seconds) and placing second in the shot put (45 feet, 2 inches). His point total was the highest of any athlete at the meet. However, the executive committee of the AAU later ruled that the mark would not qualify as a world record because the wind was at his back. The Detroit Free Press noted, "For a world-beater, Garrels has been unlucky in official recognition."

In 1932, long-time Michigan and Princeton track coach Keene Fitzpatrick, who trained multiple Olympic gold medalists, called Garrels the best all-around athlete he ever handled.

=== Football ===
Garrels also played for Fielding H. Yost's Michigan Wolverines football teams from 1904 to 1906.

As a sophomore, Garrels was the starting left end in six of ten games for the undefeated 1904 "Point-a-Minute" team that outscored its opponents 567–22.

As a junior, Garrels started all 13 games as the left end for the 1905 "Point-a-Minute" team that outscored opponents 495–2. Garrels was the third leading scorer on the 1905 team (behind Tom Hammond and Joe Curtis) with seven touchdowns and eight extra point kicks for a total of 43 points. Michigan's sole setback in 1905 was a 2–0 loss to the University of Chicago team. Garrels had the longest run of the game, a 35-yard run around Chicago's left end. Garrels was stopped by Chicago All-American Walter Eckersall. The Detroit Free Press wrote: "Had there been interference near enough to brush off Eckersall, Michigan would have scored an easy touchdown and victory." At the end of the 1905 season, the Detroit Free Press rated him as the "Star of Yost's Grid Warriors," adding, "If there was a man who stood out prominently, it was Johnnie Garrels."

As a senior, Garrels was moved to the fullback position, starting all six games at the position for the 1906 Michigan Wolverines football team that finished the season with a record of 4–1. Michigan easily won its first three games in 1906 against Case (28–0), Ohio State (6–0) and Illinois (28–9). The game against Case marked the first game at Ferry Field, and Garrels scored the Wolverines' first touchdown in the new stadium. He also returned the opening kickoff 95 yards against Illinois.

In the fourth game of the 1906 season, Michigan narrowly defeated Vanderbilt by a score of 10–4. Garrels accounted for nine of Michigan's ten points with a field goal from the 25-yard line in the first half and a touchdown run that has been reported as either 65 or 75 yards on a fake punt in the second half. Following the Vanderbilt game, The Pittsburg Press wrote:

Garrels is the best fullback in the West and probably has no equal in the country. Weighing 200 pounds, he is a wonderfully speedy runner, capable of covering the 100 yards in 10 seconds. He is a fine punter, place and drop kicker, tackles well, and is a great line plunger.

In his final game for Michigan's football team, the Wolverines lost 17-0 to Penn. The Wolverines had lost their captain, Joe Curtis, the week before the Penn game. With Curtis out of the lineup, Penn's efforts were concentrated on Garrels, and "his every attempt at an end run or a fake kick" were stopped. Despite the loss, Garrels was credited with playing a "star game," as the Detroit Free Press observed, "The sum and substance of the failure of Garrels to do much today was the great playing of Pennsylvania's ends and the almost total lack of interference by the Michigan halfbacks for him."

== 1908 Summer Olympics ==
After graduating from Michigan in 1907, Garrels trained with the Chicago Athletic Association in preparation for the 1908 Summer Olympics.

In May 1908, as the Olympic trials approached, sports reporter H.V. Valentine wrote, "No figure in the world of athletics is attracting more attention these days than that of John G. [sic] Garrles, the great all around athlete of the University of Michigan." Another reporter noted, "Garrels is undoubtedly the best all around man the middle west has ever produced. He can hurdle, jump and toss the weights and is sure to gather points for America in the many events in which he can make a strong showing." The Pittsburg Press called Garrels "one of the greatest athletes ever developed in the history of manly sports in America." Even Martin Sheridan (a five-time Olympic gold medalist) opined, "He's the greatest all-around athlete in our country -- that's what I think of him. Some day I hope to meet him, and, win or lose, that will be the greatest day of my life."

In early June 1908, the U.S. Olympic Committee announced its selections to compete in the 1908 Summer Games in London. Garrels was selected to compete for the United States in the 110-meter hurdles, discus, Greek discus and shot put.

In late June 1908, days before sailing for London, Garrels competed at the AAU meet in Pittsburgh. Garrels took first place in the 110-meter hurdles (15-3/5 seconds), the discus throw (132 feet, 8 inches) and the shot put (42 feet, 10 inches). He also finished in second place in the 100-meter race.

On June 27, 1908, Garrels set sail from New York to London aboard the Philadelphia as part of the 78-member American track team led by the famed trainer and coach Mike Murphy.

Garrels was selected to carry the American flag at the opening ceremonies in London. On July 13, 1908, he led the American delegation into the Olympic stadium at Shepherd's Bush before King Edward VII and Queen Alexandria.

Garrels began his Olympic competition with the shot put competition on July 16, 1908. He finished third in the event, as fellow American (and former University of Michigan athlete) Ralph Rose took the gold medal. The discus throw was held on the same day, and Garrels failed to finish among the leaders. Fellow American Martin Sheridan took the gold medal in the event. On July 18, 1908, Garrels also competed in the Greek discus, and again he did not place among the leaders. Competing in his fourth event, Garrels took the silver medal in the 110-meter hurdles, finishing second behind fellow American Forrest Smithson who set a new world record with a time of 15.0 seconds. Following Smithson's surprise victory over Garrels, one press account noted:

J. C. Garrels, the great University of Michigan athlete, was regarded as unbeatable in this event by the members of the American team, and Smithson's feat of beating him by two yards is something which must mark him as perhaps the greatest athlete turned out in America this season. Until this race Garrels has never been defeated in the high hurdles.

Upon their return from London, Garrels and other members of the American Olympic team were the guests of President Theodore Roosevelt at Oyster Bay.

In 1911, Mike Murphy was asked to rank the best athletes he had seen in his 30 years working with track and field athletes. Murphy rated Garrels as one of the four athletes (along with Lon Myers, Harry Jewett and Alvin Kraenzlein) "who towered head and shoulders above any other athletes of their time."

== Family and later years ==
Garrels was employed in the chemical industry for many years after retiring from athletics. He was a technical director at Wyandotte Chemical Company (acquired by BASF in 1969) for 27 years. Garrels died in 1956 at age 70.

Garrels was married to Margaret Anne Garrels. They resided in Grosse Ile Township, Michigan, where they raised three children. Their son Robert Garrels (1916-1988) was a noted geochemist.

In 2009, Garrels was posthumously inducted into the Michigan Track and Field Hall of Fame.
