= Athletics at the 1908 Summer Olympics – Men's Greek discus throw =

Athletics at the Olympics

Men's Greek-style discus throw at the Games of the IV Olympiad
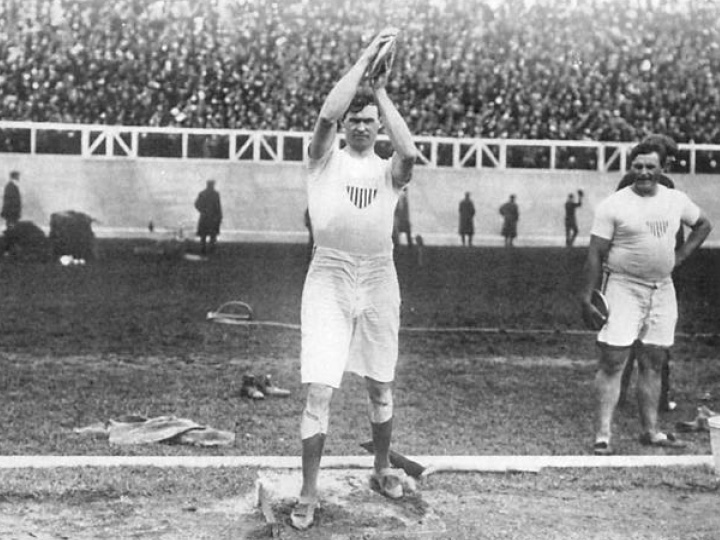
- Gold medallist Martin Sheridan in the Greek discus event; note the rectangular platform he is standing on. In the standard discus event, athletes threw from inside a white circle.
- Venue: White City Stadium
- Date: 18 July 1908
- Competitors: 23 from 8 nations

Medalists
1st place, gold medalist(s)		Martin Sheridan	United States
2nd place, silver medalist(s)		Bill Horr	United States
3rd place, bronze medalist(s)		Verner Järvinen	Finland

The men's Greek-style discus throw was one of six throwing events on the Athletics at the 1908 Summer Olympics programme in London. The competition was held on 18 July 1908. In the Greek-style event, throwers hurled the discus from atop a rectangular platform raised above the ground. Throwing style was strictly prescribed by the rules of the event. The event had been contested at the 1906 Summer Olympics, but was not held again after 1908. NOCs could enter up to 12 athletes.

== Records ==
These were the standing world and Olympic records in the standard discus throw prior to the competition.

World record	Wilhelm Dörr (GER)	43.86	Worms	1907
Olympic record	Martin Sheridan (USA); Ralph Rose (USA)	39.28	St Louis	3 September 1904

== Results ==
Place	Name	Nation	Distance
1	Martin Sheridan	United States	37.99 metres
2	Bill Horr	United States	37.32 metres
3	Verner Järvinen	Finland	36.48 metres
4	Arthur Dearborn	United States	35.65 metres
5	Michalis Dorizas	Greece	33.34 metres
6	Nikolaos Georgantas	Greece	33.21 metres
7	István Mudin	Hungary	33.11 metres
8	Wilbur Burroughs	United States	32.81 metres
9	Elmer Niklander	Finland	32.46 metres
10	Umberto Avattaneo	Italy	29.15 metres
11–23	Platt Adams	United States	Unknown
11–23	John Barrett	Great Britain	Unknown
11–23	Alfred Flaxman	Great Britain	Unknown
11–23	Folke Fleetwood	Sweden	Unknown
11–23	John Garrels	United States	Unknown
11–23	György Luntzer	Hungary	Unknown
11–23	Walter Henderson	Great Britain	Unknown
11–23	Imre Mudin	Hungary	Unknown
11–23	Henry Leeke	Great Britain	Unknown
11–23	Eric Lemming	Sweden	Unknown
11–23	Ernest May	Great Britain	Unknown
11–23	Mór Kóczán	Hungary	Unknown
11–23	Miroslav Šustera	Bohemia	Unknown

== Sources ==
- Official Report of the Games of the IV Olympiad (1908).
- De Wael, Herman. Herman's Full Olympians: "Athletics 1908". Accessed 7 April 2006. Available electronically at.
