= Verner Järvinen =

Finnish athletics competitor

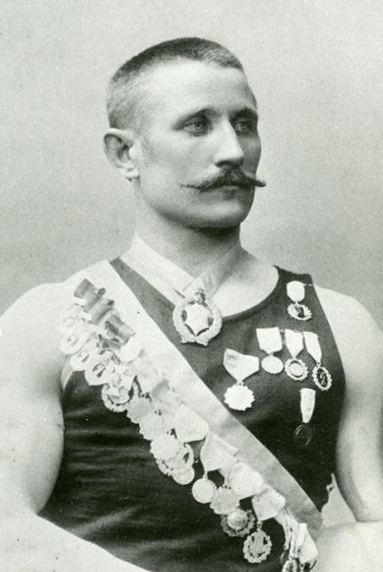

Personal information
- Full name: Venne Järvinen
- Nicknames: Isä, Verner
- National team: Finland
- Born: 3 April 1870 Ruovesi, Grand Duchy of Finland, Russian Empire
- Died: 31 January 1941 (aged 70) Tampere, Finland
- Occupation: conductor organizer
- Height: 182 cm (6 ft 0 in)
- Weight: 95 kg (209 lb)

Sport
- Sport: Athletics
- Events: Shot put, discus throw, javelin throw, hammer throw, triple jump
- Club: Helsingin Reipas; Helsingin Unitas; Helsingin Atleettiklubi; Tampereen Pyrintö

Achievements and titles
- Personal bests: Shot put: 13.93 (1903); Discus throw: 45.12 m (1909); Javelin throw: 44.25 (1906); Hammer throw: 34.83 m (1909); Triple jump: 11.51 m (1901)
Medal record
Representing (Russia) Finland
Olympic Games
| Bronze medal – third place | 1908 London | Greek discus |
Intercalated Games
| Gold medal – first place | 1906 Athens | Greek discus |
| Bronze medal – third place | 1906 Athens | Discus |
Finnish Championships in Athletics
| Gold medal – first place | 1909 | Greek discus throw |
| Gold medal – first place | 1910 | Greek discus throw |
| Gold medal – first place | 1911 | Greek discus throw |
| Silver medal – second place | 1911 | Hammer throw |
| Silver medal – second place | 1912 | Greek discus throw |
| Bronze medal – third place | 1909 | Two handed discus throw |
| Bronze medal – third place | 1910 | Two handed discus throw |
| Bronze medal – third place | 1910 | Hammer throw |
| Bronze medal – third place | 1911 | Two handed discus throw |

Venne "Verner" Järvinen (3 April 1870 – 31 January 1941) was a Finnish track and field athlete, who competed mostly in throwing events. He won the gold medal in the Greek-style discus in the 1906 Intercalated Games, and the bronze in the 1908 Summer Olympics, becoming the first Finnish Olympic medalist in athletics. He won the Finnish championship in Greek style discus three times in 1909–1911 and held the national record in discus and hammer throw.

== Career ==
Originally one of Finland's leading wrestlers, Järvinen switched to athletics with that sport's rising popularity in early 20th century Finland. Järvinen established national records in both discus throw and hammer throw, yet the latter would be the one throwing event in which he never competed at an Olympics.

=== Intercalated Games ===
At his first Olympics in Athens 1906 (now no longer officially recognized by the IOC), Järvinen was a solid medal candidate in multiple events. In the shot put he reportedly had the longest efforts (albeit in the absence of defending champion Ralph Rose), but was disqualified for throwing the shot. In the javelin he finished fifth behind four Swedes, less than a meter behind silver medalist Knut Lindberg. In the discus he finished third, with defending champion Martin Sheridan taking the top spot. Finally, on 1 May, Järvinen won the gold medal in the Greek-style discus competition.

=== Olympic Games ===
At the 1908 Summer Olympics in London, Great Britain, Järvinen finished third in the Greek-style discus and fourth in the regular discus. Both competitions were won by Sheridan. Järvinen also competed in the shot and the javelin, but without any notable success.

Järvinen appeared at the Olympics for one more time in 1912, this time competing only in the discus. At age 42, he finished 15th in the regular discus and 12th in the both hands competition.

=== National ===
He won nine medals at the Finnish Championships in Athletics:

Verner Järvinen at the Finnish Championships in Athletics
| Year | Event | Rank | Result | References |
|---|---|---|---|---|
| 1909 | Two handed shot put | 6th | 20.77 | |
| 1909 | Two handed discus throw | 3rd | 72.60 | |
| 1909 | Greek discus throw | 1st | 37.12 | |
| 1910 | Two handed discus throw | 3rd | 71.17 (31.80 + 39.37) | |
| 1910 | Greek discus throw | 1st | 37.43 | |
| 1910 | Hammer throw | 3rd | 28.48 | |
| 1911 | Two handed discus throw | 3rd | 68.62 (30.41 + 38.21) | |
| 1911 | Greek discus throw | 1st | 38.03 | |
| 1911 | Hammer throw | 2nd | 30.97 | |
| 1912 | Two handed discus throw | 5th | 60.36 (27.33 + 33.03) | |
| 1912 | Greek discus throw | 2nd | 31.84 or 31.57 | |

In discus throw, he is credited with the following Finnish records:

- 44.00 metres, in 1901
- 44.30 metres, in Saint Petersburg, on 12 August 1906. Not ratified, because at the time only marks made in Finland counted towards the Finnish record.
- 39.68 metres, Helsinki, 1 September 1907
- 44.84 metres, Helsinki, 1 August 1909

In hammer throw, he is credited with the following Finnish record:

- 34.83 metres, Helsinki, 2 August 1909

== Family ==
Three of his four sons – Kalle, Aki and Matti – would become noted Olympians in their own right. Kalle Järvinen broke the European record in shot put with a 1927 mark of 15.17 m, and competed in that event at the 1932 Summer Olympics in Los Angeles. Aki Järvinen was a two-time Olympic silver medalist and a world record holder in the decathlon, while Matti was even more successful in the javelin, winning the Olympic gold in 1932 and breaking the world record no less than ten times. All of the sons were originally coached by their father.
