= Jalmari Sauli =

Finnish athlete and writer (1889–1957)

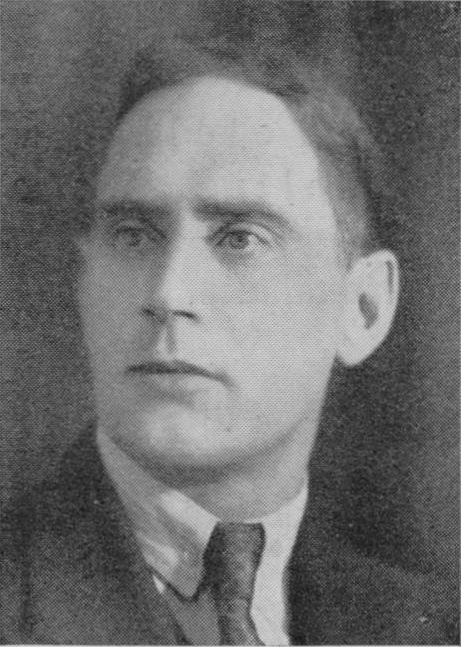
- Jalmari Sauli circa 1929

Personal information
- Full name: Jalmari Verneri Sauli
- Nationality: Finnish
- Born: Hjalmar Verner Saxelin; 17 August 1889 Hämeenlinna, Grand Duchy of Finland, Russian Empire
- Died: 22 April 1957 (aged 67) Tampere, Finland
- Education: Master of Arts, University of Helsinki, 1911
- Occupations: Fiction writer, office manager, editor-in-chief, municipal councillor
- Spouses: Lyyli Allas 1909–1929; Kaarina Helena Pirjola 1931–

Sport
- Country: Finland
- Sport: Athletics
- Event: Throwing events
- Club: Helsingin Unitas; Helsingin Reipas

Achievements and titles
- Personal bests: javelin throw: 49.47 m (1908); two-handed discus throw: 72.00 m (1908)

Jalmari Verneri Sauli (born Hjalmar Verner Saxelin; 17 August 1889 – 22 April 1957) was a Finnish writer and track and field athlete who competed in the 1908 Summer Olympics.

== Athletics ==
=== Olympics ===
Sauli entered five events at the 1908 Olympics.

Jalmari Sauli at the Olympic Games
Games	Event	Rank	Result	Notes
1908 Summer Olympics	Shot put	7th	12.58 m	Source:
1908 Summer Olympics	Discus throw	12th–24th	unknown	Source:
1908 Summer Olympics	Javelin throw	7th	unknown	Source: Distances were only measured for the first six competitors.
1908 Summer Olympics	Freestyle javelin throw	8th	43.30 m	Source:
1908 Summer Olympics	Greek discus throw	Did not start		Source:

=== Records ===
Sauli posted 25.38 metres in two-handed shot put in Stockholm on 13 September 1908. This was declared a world record.

Sauli became the first Finn to exceed 14 metres in shot put when he put 14.06 metres on 5 September 1908.

== White Guard ==
Sauli joined the Mänttä White Guard as it was taking form in November 1917 and became its chief of logistics. He was wounded in the Finnish Civil War. He was the local chief of Mänttä White Guard in 1919–1921, and a member of staff of North Tavastia White Guard District in 1920.

He was the editor-in-chief of the White Guard magazine Varsinais-Suomen vartio.

== Writer ==
Sauli was the assistant editor-in-chief of Aamulehti in 1911–1914. He was the editor-in-chief of the newspaper Hämeen Sanomat in 1914–1917 and the regional weekly Järviseutu in 1937–1939 and 1941–1944.

His impetus to start writing novels was a months-long recovery period after being wounded in the Finnish Civil War. The resulting book Valkoinen varjo drew from his experiences in the war and is credited as the first Finnish adventure novel. The book was handed out as an award by the White Guard. Sauli's patriotic views became the base for his literary career.

He mostly wrote novels for young adults in the genres of historical and wilderness adventure. He also wrote novels for adults, plays and children's books. His books have been reprinted the last time in the 1980s.

He won the Finnish State Prize for Literature in 1928 for Himmeli and in 1937 for Vanha savenvalaja.

He used the pseudonyms Heikki Hernesmaa and Samuli.

== Family ==
Father was industrialist Carl Otto Saxelin and mother Saida Maria Blåfield.

Brother Jonni Sauli was a professor of agriculture at the University of Helsinki. Brother Into Saxelin was a sculptor.

Jalmari, Saida and Jonni finnicized their family name from Saxelin to Sauli on 6 April 1908.

His first marriage was to Lyyli Allas in 1909–1929, and his second to Kaarina Helena Pirjola from 1931.

Son Jaakko Sauli won two Finnish national championship golds in relay races in 1935 and 1936. He was a company commander in the Bicycle Battalion 5 during the Winter War when a close-range machine gun burst from a tank and wounded him lethally.

== Sources ==
- Siukonen, Markku (2001). Urheilukunniamme puolustajat. Suomen olympiaedustajat 1906–2000. Suuri olympiateos (in Finnish). Jyväskylä: Graface. p. 300. ISBN 951-98673-1-7.
