= Athletics at the 1912 Summer Olympics – Men's two handed discus throw =

Men's two handed discus throw at the Games of the V Olympiad
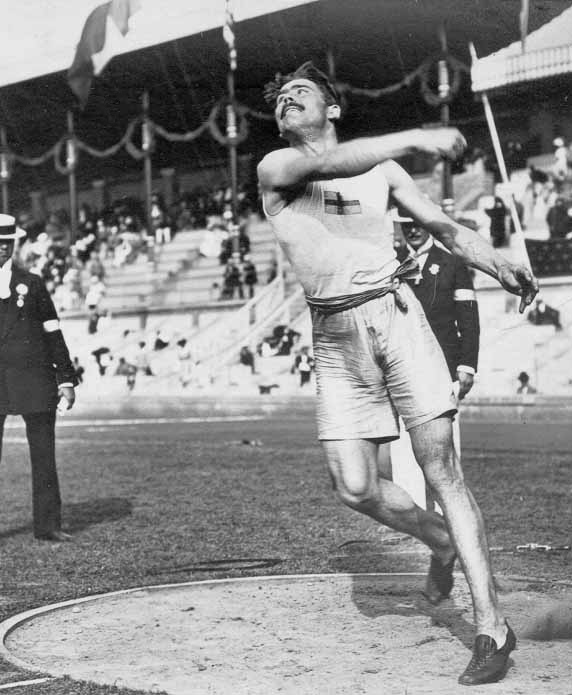
- Magnusson on the way to win the bronze medal.
- Venue: Stockholm Olympic Stadium
- Date: July 13, 1912
- Competitors: 20 from 6 nations

Medalists
1st place, gold medalist(s)		Armas Taipale	Finland
2nd place, silver medalist(s)		Elmer Niklander	Finland
3rd place, bronze medalist(s)		Emil Magnusson	Sweden

The men's two handed discus throw was a track and field athletics event held as part of the Athletics at the 1912 Summer Olympics programme. It was the only appearance of the event at the Olympics, along with the other two handed throws. The format of the event was such that each thrower threw the discus three times with his right hand and three times with his left hand. The best distance with each hand was summed to give a total. The three finalists received three more throws with each hand. The competition was held on Saturday, July 13, 1912. Twenty discus throwers from six nations competed. NOCs could enter up to 12 athletes.

== Results ==
Taipale, who had won the standard discus throw, also won the two-handed event.

Place	Athlete	Preliminary					Final			Best mark total
Place	Athlete	1	2	3	Total	Rank	4	5	6	Best mark total
1	Armas Taipale (FIN)	42.68	43.70	44.68	80.03	1st	42.78	—	44.68	82.86
1	Armas Taipale (FIN)	34.15	35.35	—	80.03	1st	38.18	—	—	82.86
2	Elmer Niklander (FIN)	—	40.28	—	72.05	3rd	37.04	37.94	—	77.96
2	Elmer Niklander (FIN)	31.77	—		72.05	3rd	33.10	37.68	—	77.96
3	Emil Magnusson (SWE)	40.28	—	—	75.35	2nd	37.03	38.90	40.58	77.37
3	Emil Magnusson (SWE)	35.07	—	—	75.35	2nd	36.05	36.13	36.79	77.37
4	Einar Nilsson (SWE)	39.60	40.99	—	71.40	4th				71.40
4	Einar Nilsson (SWE)	—	25.78	30.41	71.40	4th				71.40
5	James Duncan (USA)	39.78	—	—	71.13	5th				71.13
5	James Duncan (USA)	31.35	—	—	71.13	5th				71.13
6	Emil Muller (USA)	39.83	—	—	69.56	6th				69.56
6	Emil Muller (USA)	29.73	—	—	69.56	6th				69.56
7	Folke Fleetwood (SWE)	35.05	36.95	—	68.22	7th				68.22
7	Folke Fleetwood (SWE)	30.96	31.27	—	68.22	7th				68.22
8	Carl Johan Lind (SWE)	—	33.58	34.20	68.02	8th				68.02
8	Carl Johan Lind (SWE)	33.82	—	—	68.02	8th				68.02
9	Nils Linde (SWE)	—	34.31	34.98	67.10	9th				67.10
9	Nils Linde (SWE)	32.12	—	—	67.10	9th				67.10
10	Gunnar Nilsson (SWE)	35.89	36.50	36.86	67.09	10th				67.09
10	Gunnar Nilsson (SWE)	26.93	30.23	—	67.09	10th				67.09
11	Eric Lemming (SWE)	36.27	—	37.86	67.08	11th				67.08
11	Eric Lemming (SWE)	28.81	—	29.22	67.08	11th				67.08
12	Venne Järvinen (FIN)	37.84	—	—	66.69	12th				66.69
12	Venne Järvinen (FIN)	27.88	28.85	—	66.69	12th				66.69
13	Hans Tronner (AUT)	34.45	38.54	39.95	66.66	13th				66.66
13	Hans Tronner (AUT)	20.73	22.35	26.71	66.66	13th				66.66
14	Rezsõ Újlaki (HUN)	35.93	—	40.32	66.18	14th				66.18
14	Rezsõ Újlaki (HUN)	25.28	—	25.86	66.18	14th				66.18
15	Arlie Mucks (USA)	42.63	—	—	63.83	15th				63.83
15	Arlie Mucks (USA)	21.20	—	—	63.83	15th				63.83
16	Josef Schäffer (AUT)	36.59	—	—	63.50	16th				63.50
16	Josef Schäffer (AUT)	26.77	26.91	—	63.50	16th				63.50
17	Richard Byrd (USA)	—	40.10	—	62.32	17th				62.32
17	Richard Byrd (USA)	—	22.22		62.32	17th				62.32
18	Károly Kobulszky (HUN)	34.62	35.22	37.01	59.48	18th				59.48
18	Károly Kobulszky (HUN)	—	22.47	—	59.48	18th				59.48
19	Vasily Molokanov (RUS)	24.79	—	—	47.37	19th				47.37
19	Vasily Molokanov (RUS)	22.19	22.58	—	47.37	19th				47.37
20	György Luntzer (HUN)	32.67	36.97	37.68	None	20th				None
20	György Luntzer (HUN)	—	—	—	None	20th				None

== Sources ==
- Bergvall, Erik, ed. (1913). The Official Report of the Olympic Games of Stockholm 1912. Translated by Adams-Ray, Edward. Stockholm: Wahlström & Widstrand.
- Wudarski, Pawel (1999). "Wyniki Igrzysk Olimpijskich" (in Polish).
