= André Tison =

French athletics competitor (1885–1963)

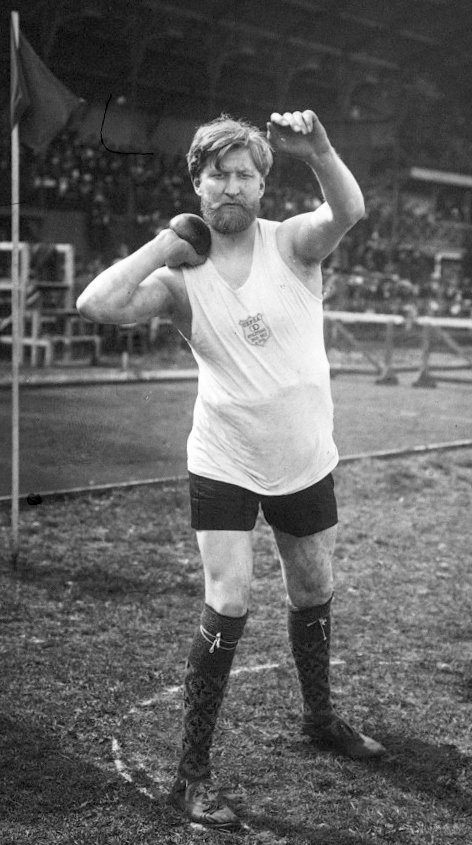
- André Tison in 1912

Personal information
- Born: 26 February 1885 Paris, France
- Died: 25 December 1963 (aged 78) Saint-Maur-des-Fossés, France
- Height: 196 cm (6 ft 5 in)

Sport
- Sport: Athletics
- Events: Discus throw, shot put
- Club: TC Sceaux (−1895); Racing CF, Paris (1897–1912); Paris UC (1913–)

Achievements and titles
- Personal bests: DT – 41.90 m (1909); SP – 13.495 m (1910)

André Tison (26 February 1885 – 25 December 1963) was a French track and field athlete who competed at the 1906, 1908, 1912 and 1920 Summer Olympics.

== Biography ==
At the 1906 Olympic Games, he finished fourth in the shot put, fifth in the freestyle discus throw, and 22nd in the standing long jump competition. Two years later, he placed eighth in the discus throw, while his result in the shot put contest is unknown.

Tison finished second behind James Barrett in the shot put event at the British 1911 AAA Championships.

In 1912 he was ninth in the shot put and 30th in the discus throw, and in 1920 he finished eleventh in the discus throw. The following year, he finished second behind Einar Nilsson in the shot put event at the 1913 AAA Championships.

Tison was the French champion in the shot put (1905, 1907, 1908, 1910, 1911, 1913, and 1914) and discus throw (1907–1914 and 1920); he finished second in the shot put (1909, 1912, 1919, and 1920) and javelin throw (1913) and third in the discus throw (1919). He held national records in the shot put (1905: 12.46 m, 1907: 12.75 m, 1908: 12.81 m, 1909: 13.145 m) and discus throw (1908: 39.13 m, 1909: 41.25 m, 1913: 41.58 m).
