= Michael Collins (athlete) =

Irish discus thrower

Personal information
- Nationality: Irish
- Born: 15 September 1879 Currans, County Kerry, Ireland
- Died: 23 February 1959 (aged 79) Currans, County Kerry, Ireland

Sport
- Sport: Athletics
- Event: Discus throw/shot put
- Club: Gaelic Athletic Association; Polytechnic Harriers

Michael Collins (15 September 1879 – 23 February 1959) was an Irish athlete. He competed at the 1908 Summer Olympics.

== Biography ==
Collins was born in Currans, County Kerry, Ireland but moved to London to work for Pearl Life Assurance. He joined the Polytechnic Harriers.

He finished third behind fellow Irishman Denis Horgan in the shot put event at the 1905 AAA Championships and the following year finished fourth at the 1906 AAA Championships.

Collins represented the Great Britain team at the 1908 Olympic Games in London, where he participated in the men's discus throw competition. His mark in the event is unknown and he failed to progress and he did not start in the Greek discus throw competition.

Collins returned to Ireland, taking charge of the family farm at Ballindroichead, Currans, where he lived until his death on 3 February 1959.
