= Patrick Quinn (athlete) =

Irish shot putter and discus thrower

Personal information
- Born: 10 December 1885 Erinagh, County Tipperary, Ireland
- Died: 2 January 1946 (aged 60) Dublin, Ireland

Sport
- Sport: Athletics
- Event: discus / shot put
- Club: Dublin Metropolitan Police

Patrick Quinn (10 December 1885 – 2 January 1946) was an Irish track and field athlete who competed for Great Britain and Ireland in the 1912 Summer Olympics

== Career ==
Quinn born in Nenagh, County Tipperary, joined the Dublin Metropolitan Police in 1905, serving in the Band Division. He was selected to represent Great Britain at the 1912 Olympic Games in Stockholm, Sweden. He finished eighth in the shot put competition.

Quinn won six Irish discus titles (1910, 1912, 1913, 1914, 1921, 1922) and four shot put titles (1912, 1913, 1914, 1921). Quinn finished second behind Armas Taipale in the discus event at the British 1914 AAA Championships and after the war would win AAA discus title at the 1920 AAA Championships.
