= Miroslav Šustera =

Czech discus thrower and wrestler

Miroslav Šustera (March 15, 1878 – December 15, 1961) was a Czech track and field athlete and wrestler who competed in the 1906 Summer Olympics, in the 1908 Summer Olympics, and in the 1912 Summer Olympics. He was born and died in Prague.

In 1906, he finished seventh in the Greek discus throw event and twelfth in the ancient pentathlon competition. He also participated in the discus throw event, but his result is unknown.

Four years later, he participated in the Greek discus throw event and in the discus throw competition, but in both contests his result is unknown. At the 1908 Olympics, he also competed in the Greco-Roman light heavyweight event but was eliminated in the first round after losing his fight to Walter West.

His last Olympic appearance was in 1912 when he finished 38th in the discus throw event.
