= Walter Henderson (athlete) =

British track and field athlete

Personal information
- Born: 21 June 1880 Leeds, England
- Died: 2 September 1944 (aged 64) Chelsea, London

Sport
- Sport: Athletics
- Event: high jump
- Club: London Athletic Club; University of Oxford AC; Achilles Club

Walter Edward Bonhote Henderson (21 June 1880 – 2 September 1944) was a British track and field athlete who competed in the 1908 Summer Olympics and in the 1912 Summer Olympics.

== Biography ==
Henderson born in Leeds but educated at Winchester College and Trinity College, Oxford.

He finished second in the high jump event at the British 1900 AAA Championships. He finished third in the high jump at the 1908 AAA Championships.

Henderson represented Great Britain at the 1908 Summer Olympics in London, where he finished eighth in the standing high jump competition. He also participated in the standing long jump event, in the discus throw competition, in the Greek discus throw event, and in the freestyle javelin throw competition but in all these competitions his final ranking is unknown.

Four years later, he finished 32nd in the discus throw competition at the 1912 Summer Olympics.

Henderson died in Chelsea, London.
