= Arthur Dearborn =

American track and field athlete

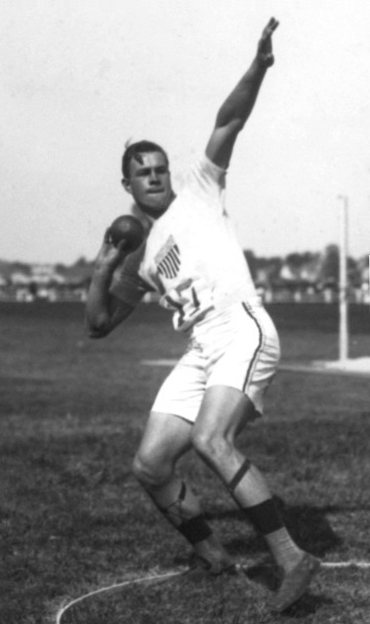
- Arthur Dearborn in 1908

Personal information
- Born: May 27, 1886 Everett, Massachusetts, United States
- Died: August 28, 1941 (aged 76) Boston, Massachusetts, United States
- Height: 1.78 m (5 ft 10 in)
- Weight: 91 kg (201 lb)

Sport
- Sport: Athletics
- Events: Shot put, discus throw
- Club: NYAC, New York

Achievements and titles
- Personal best: DT – 42.65 m (1908)

Arthur Kent "Ding" Dearborn (May 27, 1886 – August 28, 1941) was an American track and field athlete who competed at the 1908 Summer Olympics. He finished fourth in the Greek discus throw event and fifth in the conventional discus throw. He was also a member of the American tug of war team, which was eliminated in the first round.
