= Alfred Flaxman =

British athlete (1879–1916)

Personal information
- Nationality: British (English)
- Born: 1 October 1879 Wombwell, England
- Died: 1 July 1916 (aged 36) Gommecourt, Pas-de-Calais, France

Sport
- Sport: Athletics
- Events: discus, javelin, high jump, hammer, pole vault
- Club: South London Harriers

Alfred Edward Flaxman (1 October 1879 – 1 July 1916) was a British track and field athlete who competed in the 1908 Summer Olympics.

== Biography ==
Flaxman was born in Wombwell, West Riding of Yorkshire, the son of a Yorkshire vicar. He studied violin at the Royal Academy of Music but became an all-round athlete.

Flaxman represented Great Britain at the 1908 Summer Olympics in London, where he participated in the discus throw competition, the Greek discus throw event, the freestyle javelin throw competition, and the standing high jump event but in all these competitions his final ranking is unknown.

Flaxman became the British pole jump champion (as it was called at the time) after winning the British AAA Championships title at the 1909 AAA Championships. He then became the British hammer throw champion after winning the British title at the 1910 AAA Championships.

Flaxman was killed in action during the First World War in Gommecourt, Pas-de-Calais, France, serving as a second lieutenant with the South Staffordshire Regiment on the first day of the Battle of the Somme, aged 26. His remains were not recovered, and he is commemorated on the Thiepval Memorial.

== See also ==
- List of Olympians killed in World War I
