= Umberto Avattaneo =

Italian discus thrower (1883–1958)

Personal information
- Nationality: Italian
- Born: April 2, 1883 Rome, Italy
- Died: January 9, 1958 (aged 74)

Sport
- Country: Italy
- Sport: Athletics
- Event: Discus throw
- Club: Società Ginnastica Roma

Achievements and titles
- Personal bests: Discus throw: 43.20 m (1910); Shot put: 11.52 m (1910); Javelin freestyle: 50.38 m (1910)

Umberto Avattaneo (April 2, 1883 – January 9, 1958) was an Italian track and field athlete who competed in the 1908 Summer Olympics.

== Biography ==
He was born in Rome. In 1908, he finished tenth in the Greek discus throw event. In the discus throw competition his result is unknown.

== Achievements ==
Year	Competition	Venue	Position	Event	Performance	Note
1908	Olympic Games	(United Kingdom) London	10th	Greek discus	29.15 m	
1908	Olympic Games	(United Kingdom) London	Final	Discus throw	-	

== See also ==
- Italy at the 1908 Summer Olympics
