= György Luntzer =

Hungarian athlete and wrestler

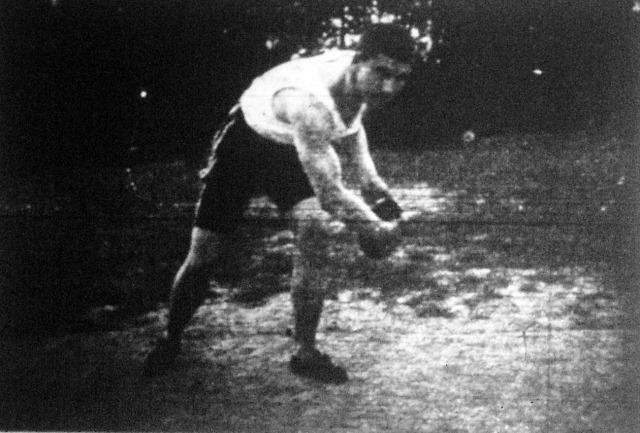

Personal information
- Nationality: Hungarian
- Born: August 23, 1886 Pozsony, Kingdom of Hungary (now Bratislava, Slovakia)
- Died: March 11, 1942 (aged 55) Transylvania

Sport
- Country: Hungary
- Sport: Discus throw, javelin throw, sports wrestling
- Club: Pozsonyi Torna Egylet

Achievements and titles
- Personal best: Discus throw – 41.93 m (1911)
- Updated on 28 October 2013

György Luntzer (Hungarian: [ˈɟørɟ ˈlunt͡sɛr]; also spelled Luncser; Slovak: Juraj Luntzer; August 23, 1886 – March 11, 1942) was a Hungarian track and field athlete and sport wrestler. A three-time Hungarian Athletics Championships winner in the discus throw, he also participated at the 1908 Summer Olympics and the 1912 Summer Olympics, achieving his best result in 1908 by finishing seventh in the discus throw event.

== Sports achievements ==
Born in Pozsony (present-day Bratislava), Luntzer competed for his hometown club Pozsonyi Torna Egylet. His first major international appearance came in 1906, when he took part at the Intercalated Games, where he competed in four events (discus throw, Greek-style discus throw, javelin throw and pentathlon). Luntzer finished fifth in Greek-style discus throw and tenth in pentathlon, while his other results are unknown.

Two years later at the 1908 Summer Olympics he finished seventh in the discus throw competition. He also participated in the Greek discus throw competition and in the freestyle javelin throw event but in both competitions his final ranking is unknown. He also participated as sport wrestler in the 1908 Summer Games but was eliminated in the first round of the Greco-Roman light heavyweight event.

Four years later he finished 21st in the discus throw competition as well as twentieth in the two handed discus throw event. On national level Luntzer collected three Hungarian Athletics Championships titles in discus throw, winning the event in 1908, 1912 and 1915.
