= Mór Kóczán =

Athlete and Calvinist pastor (1895–1972)

Personal information
- Full name: Móric Kóczán
- Nationality: Hungarian, Czechoslovak
- Born: 8 January 1885 Kocs, Kingdom of Hungary, Austria-Hungary
- Died: 30 July 1972 (aged 77) Alsógöd, Hungary

Achievements and titles
- Personal bests: Discus throw – 39.09 m (1910); Javelin throw – 59.71 m (1914)
Medal record
Men's athletics
Representing Hungary
Olympic Games
| Bronze medal – third place | 1912 Stockholm | Javelin throw |

Móric "Mór" Kóczán (Hungarian: [ˈmoːr ˈkoːt͡saːn]; also known under the pseudonym Miklós Kovács; 8 January 1885 – 30 July 1972) was a Slovak–Hungarian athlete and Calvinist pastor. Specialized for the throwing events, his best results came in the javelin throw, having won five Hungarian championship titles between 1911 and 1918. Kóczán competed for Hungary at the 1908 Summer Olympics and 1912 Summer Olympics. He produced his best performance in 1912 by winning the bronze medal in the javelin throw event.

Following World War I, after the borders of Hungary were redrawn, Kóczán, together with hundreds of thousands of ethnic Hungarians, found himself in the newly created Czechoslovakia. In 1920 he became Czechoslovak champion in the javelin throw and four years later represented the country at the Olympics, where he finished in 23rd place. Besides athletics, he did not forget his pastoral duties and he also urged the local communities to take part in sports. In 1948 he was deported to Hungary and lived the last decades of his life in Alsógöd, where he died in 1972.

== Early life ==
Kóczán was born on 8 January 1885 in Kocs, Kingdom of Hungary to Lajos Kóczán, the rector of the local Reformed elementary school, and Franciska Bakos. He spent his childhood in Kocs before moving to Pápa, where he studied in the Reformed high school and later in the Theological Academy, earning his pastoral degree in 1908. Kóczán was inaugurated as the vice pastor of Csallóközaranyos (now Zlatná na Ostrove) in 1907, where he became pastor a year later and stayed in his position until 1914.

== Athletics career and pastoral service ==
Kóczán began training athletics during his high school years and in 1900 he was already a member of Budapesti TC. An all-around athlete, Kóczán competed in the discus throw, the shot put and the javelin throw, achieving his best results in the latter one. In 1908 he was invited to an athletics competition in Budapest, which he won with a throw of 57.05 metres – a result better than the then-world record – and made into the Olympic team as well. Between 1909 and 1911 he broke his own record further three times, however, the IAAF officially ratified the World record since 1912, therefore these results remained unofficial. Kóczán competed at the 1908 Summer Olympics in the discus throw event, the Greek discus competition, the freestyle javelin event, and the shot put competition, but remained without any success.

In 1910 Kóczán switched to Ferencvárosi TC, for them he won the inaugural javelin throw event of the Hungarian Athletics Championships in 1911, which was followed by another four titles (1912–14, 1918). He also triumphed in a number of national and international competitions, including the Austrian Athletics Championships in 1913 and the British Athletics Championships in 1914.

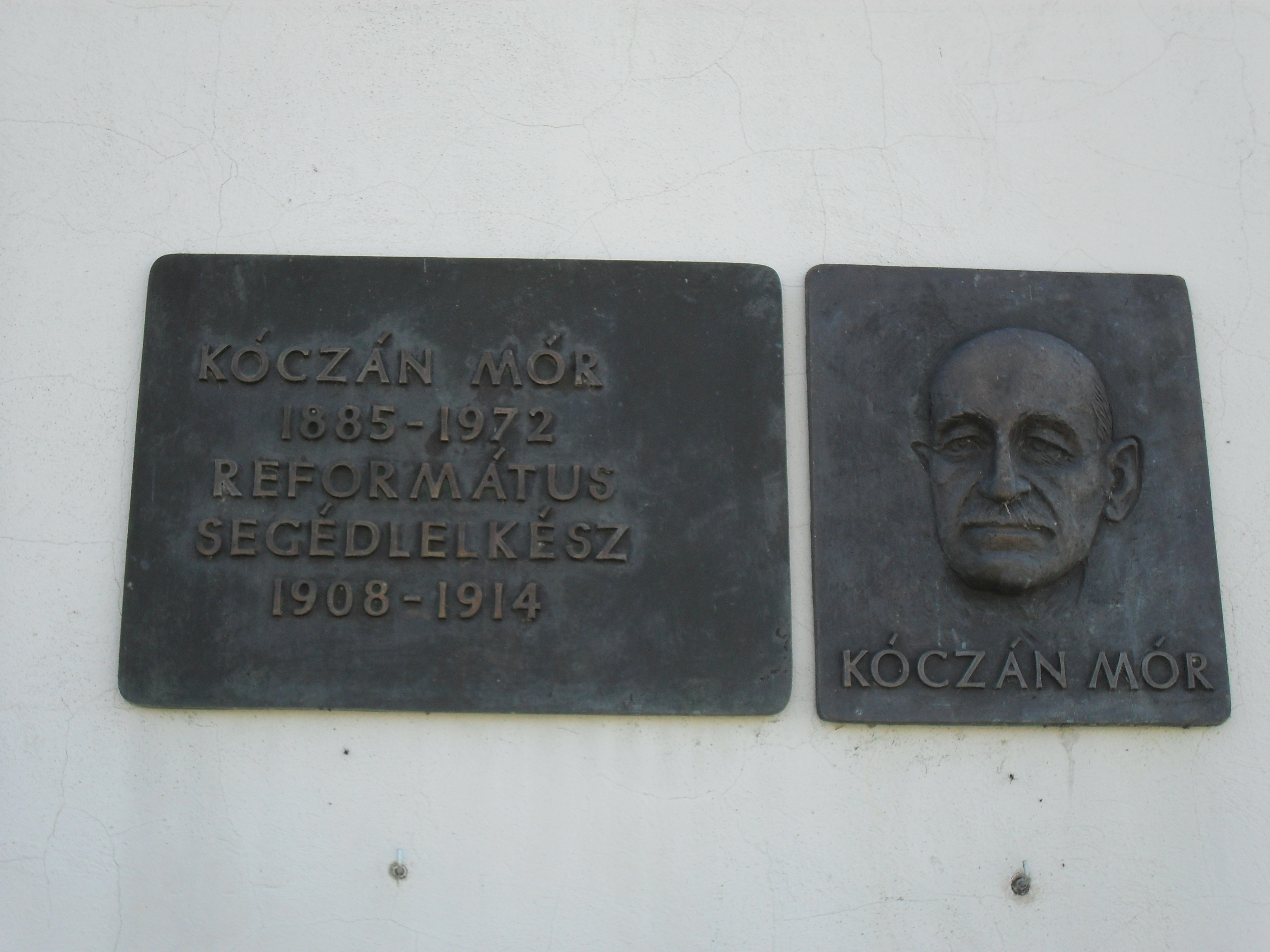
Memorial plaque of Kóczán in Čiližská Radvaň

Kóczán participated at the 1912 Summer Olympics under the pseudonym Mór Kovács to avoid conflicts with the church, which opposed his sporting activities. In the qualifying round of his main event, the javelin throw, Kóczán topped his group and achieved third best overall result with 54.99 metres. In the final round he improved it to 55.50 but could not match defending champion Eric Lemming (60.64) and Julius Saaristo (58.66), and eventually won the bronze medal thus becoming the first non-Scandinavian to win a medal in the javelin throw at the Olympic Games as well as the first Hungarian to win an Olympic medal in athletics. In the two handed javelin throw competition Kóczán finished 12th and in the discus throw event he came 33rd.

Kóczán won the British AAA Championships title in the javelin event at the 1914 AAA Championships.

In 1914, after seven years of pastoral service in Csallóközaranyos, and shorter spells in Diósjenő (1909) and Diósförgepatony (now Orechová Potôň; March 1910–May 1910), Kóczán was relocated to Csilizradvány (now Čiližská Radvaň). In the same year, he married Karola Halász, with whom he had two daughters, Gizella and Edit. Upon the reluctance of the church towards athletics toned down, Kóczán formed a sports club in Csilizradvány and organized sporting activities in the village.

Following World War I the northern Hungarian territories, including Csilizradvány, became part of the newly formed Czechoslovak state. Kóczán, taking the minority life, remained with his congregation and continued his pastoral work. He also participated in the Czechoslovak athletics contests, competing for Sparta Prague. Kóczán won the javelin throw event at the 1920 national championship and represented Czechoslovakia at the 1924 Summer Olympics in Paris; however, he could not repeat his former performances and finished only 23rd in the javelin throw. He gave up professional sport in 1926.

== Death and legacy ==
Kóczán was deported with his family from Czechoslovakia to Hungary in September 1948; subsequently, they settled in Alsógöd (now part of Göd), a village in the Pilis Mountains, where he served as a pastor until 1952. Kóczán did not stay entirely away from sport after his retirement, as he worked as a coach and sporting judge. He died after a short hospital treatment on 30 July 1972 in Alsógöd and was buried in the local Reformed cemetery.

Since 1999, the city council of Göd has awarded the Mór Kóczán Ambulatory Prize of Göd every year to the best sportspeople in the town in three categories (men, women, team). In 2005 the Hungarian language elementary school in Zlatná na Ostrove took the name of Kóczán, and the local sports hall also bears his name. In 2008 the Hungarian language school of Čiližská Radvaň was also renamed in his honour. On the same occasion the memorial plaque of Kóczán, a work by Géza Nagy, was revealed as well.
