= Wilbur Burroughs =

American track and field athlete

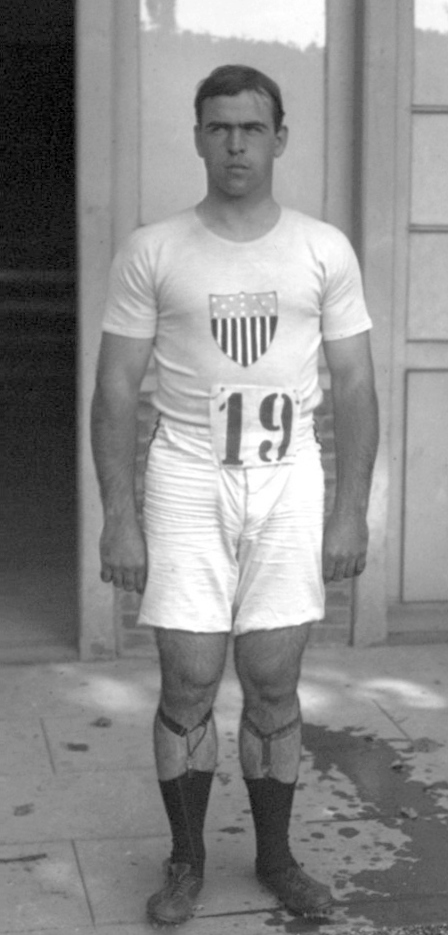
- Wilbur Burroughs in 1908

Personal information
- Born: June 13, 1884 Edwardsville, Illinois, United States
- Died: August 6, 1960 (aged 76) Granite City, Illinois, United States
- Height: 1.88 m (6 ft 2 in)
- Weight: 89 kg (196 lb)

Sport
- Sport: Athletics
- Events: Shot put, discus throw, hammer throw
- Club: Chicago AA

Achievements and titles
- Personal bests: SP – 13.53 m (1908); DT – 40.93 m (1908); HT – 45.79 m (1908)

Wilbur Gordon Burroughs Sr. (June 13, 1884 – August 6, 1960) was an American track and field athlete who competed at the 1908 Summer Olympics. He finished eighth in the Greek discus throw event and tenth in the traditional discus throw; his result in the shot put is unknown. He was also a member of the American tug of war team that was eliminated in the first round.
