= Folke Fleetwood =

Swedish discus thrower

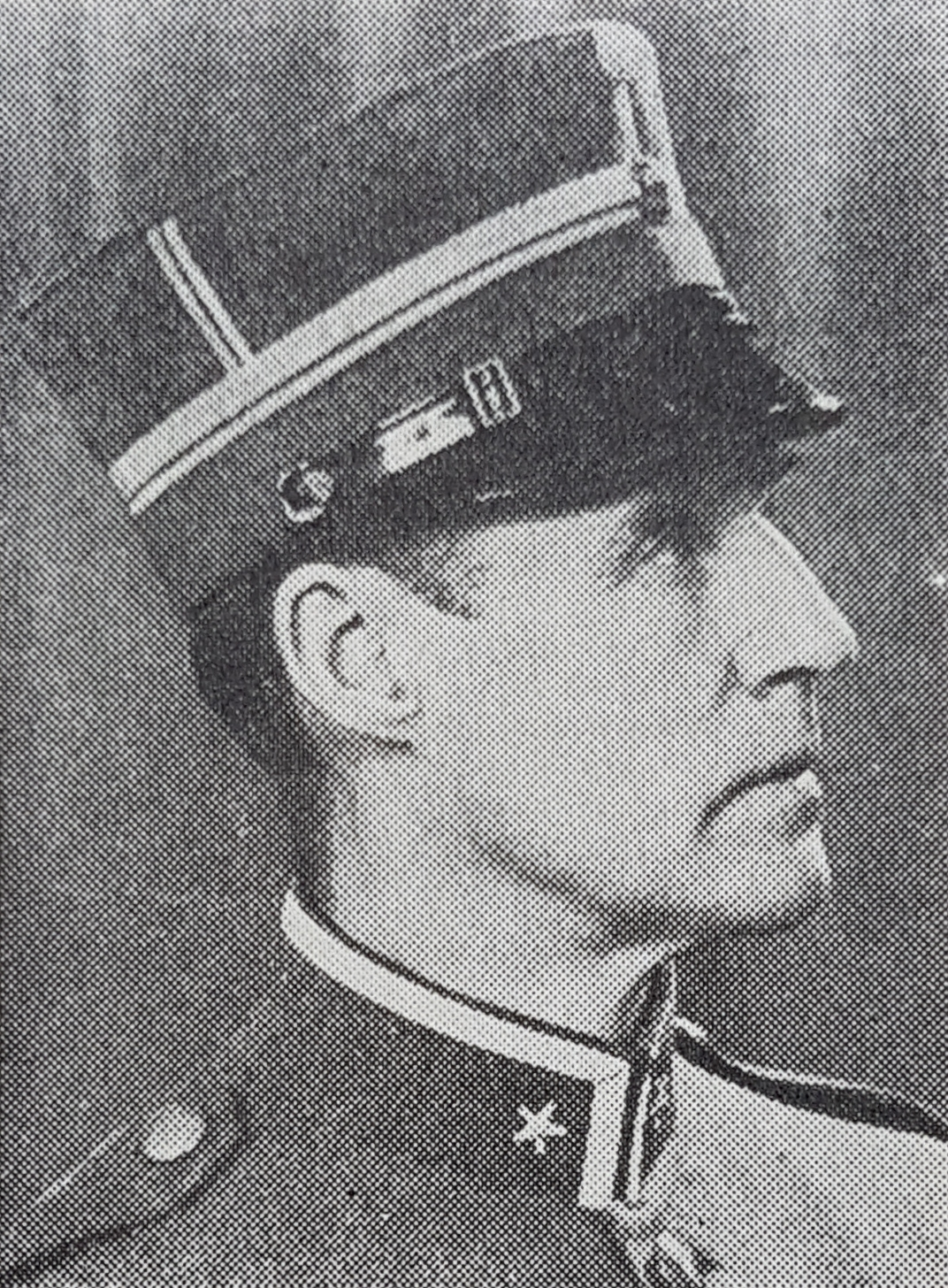
Folke Fleetwood

Folke Fredrik Fleetwood (15 November 1890 – 4 February 1949) was a Swedish track and field athlete who competed in the 1908 Summer Olympics and in the 1912 Summer Olympics.

In 1908, he participated in the Greek discus throw competition and in the discus throw event, but in both competitions his final ranking is unknown.

Four years later, he finished seventh in the two handed discus throw competition and 28th in the discus throw event.
