= Ēriks Vanags =

Latvian athlete

Ēriks Vanags (born 20 January 1893 in Riga) was a Latvian track and field athlete who competed for the Russian Empire in the 1912 Summer Olympics. In 1912, he finished 20th in the shot put competition and 39th in the discus throw event.
