= Theodor Neijström =

Swedish discus thrower

Theodor Neijström (September 23, 1883 – July 29, 1948) was a Swedish track and field athlete who competed in the 1908 Summer Olympics. In 1908 he participated in the discus throw competition but his final ranking is unknown.
