= Elmer Niklander =

Finnish athlete (1890–1942)

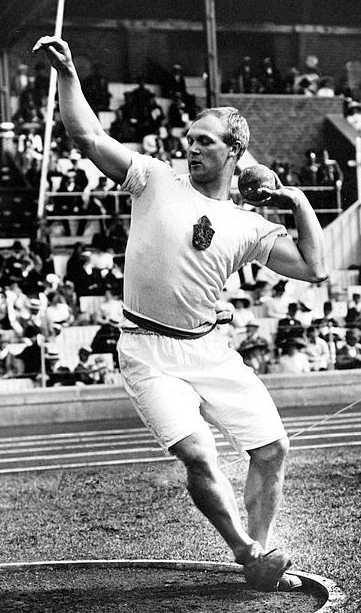
- Elmer Niklander at the 1912 Olympics

Personal information
- Full name: Elmer Konstantin Niklander
- Nicknames: Elmeri, Niku, Oitin kanuuna
- National team: Finland
- Born: 19 January 1890 Hausjärvi, Grand Duchy of Finland, Russian Empire
- Died: 12 November 1942 (aged 52) Helsinki, Finland
- Monument: statue Oitin kanuuna Elmer Niklander by Evert Porila in 1917
- Occupation: farmer
- Height: 1.85 m (6 ft 1 in)
- Weight: 79 kg (174 lb)

Sport
- Sport: Athletics
- Events: Discus throw; Hammer throw; Javelin throw; Shot put
- Club: Helsingin Kisa-Veikot; Helsingin Reipas; Oitin VPK:n urheilijat

Achievements and titles
- National finals: 44 Finnish championships in throwing events in 1909–1924
- Personal bests: Discus throw: 47.18 m (1916); Two-handed discus throw: 90.13 m (1913) WR; Hammer throw: 47.57 m (1916); Javelin throw: 54.19 m (1916); Shot put: 14.86 m (1913); Two-handed shot put: 27.75 m (1913); Weight throw: 10.76 m (1914)
Medal record
Representing Finland (Russia)
Olympic Games
Gold medal – first place	1920 Antwerp	Discus throw
Silver medal – second place	1912 Stockholm	Two-handed discus throw
Silver medal – second place	1920 Antwerp	Shot put
Bronze medal – third place	1912 Stockholm	Two-handed shot put

Elmer Konstantin Niklander (19 January 1890 – 12 November 1942) was a Finnish athlete who competed in throwing events, winning the gold medal in the 1920 discus throw and three other Olympic medals and 44 Finnish championships.

== Athletics ==
Niklander started training at the age of 12 and competing at 17. He trained mostly on his brother's farm.

He excelled in two-handed throwing events.

=== Olympic Games ===
Elmer Niklander at the Olympic Games
Games	Event	Rank	Result	Notes
1908 Summer Olympics	Men's Greek discus throw	9th	32.46 m	Source:
1908 Summer Olympics	Men's shot put	9th–25th	unknown	Result was not officially recorded. Result was circa 11 metres. At the age of 18 years and 179 days, he is the youngest competitor in shot put in Olympic history (with a known birthdate; Miltiadis Gouskos might be younger).
1908 Summer Olympics	Men's discus throw	12th–42nd	unknown	Result was not officially recorded. Result was circa 36 metres.
1912 Summer Olympics	Men's shot put	4th	13.65 m	
1912 Summer Olympics	Men's discus throw	4th	42.09 m	His first round throw. It broke the Olympic record, but was then broken on the second round.
1912 Summer Olympics	Men's two handed shot put	3rd	27.14 m	
1912 Summer Olympics	Men's two handed discus throw	2nd	77.96 m	
1920 Summer Olympics	Men's shot put	2nd	14.155 m	
1920 Summer Olympics	Men's discus throw	1st	44.685 m	
1920 Summer Olympics	Men's 56 pound weight throw	8th	8.865 m	
1924 Summer Olympics	Men's shot put	6th	14.265 m	His fourth entrance in the event, which ties him for the record of most appearances in Olympic men's shot put.
1924 Summer Olympics	Men's discus throw	7th	42.09 m	

In 1924, he served as the Olympic flag bearer for Finland.

=== National ===
Niklander won 44 titles at the Finnish Championships in Athletics in throwing events in 1909–1924, a national record in itself. Summary:

- two-handed discus throw, 11 titles: 1909, 1910, 1911, 1912, 1913, 1914, 1915, 1916, 1917, 1918, 1920
- two-handed shot put, 11 titles: 1909, 1910, 1912, 1913, 1914, 1915, 1916, 1917, 1918, 1920, 1924
- shot put, better hand only; 7 titles: 1914, 1915, 1916, 1917, 1918, 1920, 1924
- hammer throw, 6 titles: 1911, 1914, 1915, 1916, 1917, 1918
- discus throw, better hand only; 5 titles: 1914, 1915, 1916, 1917, 1918
- Greek discus throw, 2 titles: 1912, 1913
- weight throw, 2 titles: 1914, 1918

He also won 12 silvers and 1 bronze.

=== Records and bests ===
Niklander broke a world record once:

- 20 July 1913, two-handed discus throw, 90.13 m. The record still stands.

He also broke two world records unofficially:

- 1909, two-handed shot put, 26.89 m
- 1910, two-handed discus throw, 87.12 m

Neither result was ratified as a record because the dimensions of the throwing circle weren't up to the international standard.

He broke several Finnish national records:

- 25 October 1907, shot put, 13.47 m
- 4 July 1909, shot put, 14.68 m
- 19 June 1910, discus throw, 44.88 m
- 15 August 1910, hammer throw, 40.04 m
- 19 July 1913, two-handed shot put, 27.75 m
- 7 June 1914, hammer throw, 45.95 m
- 1914, weight throw, 10.76 m
- 4 July 1915, hammer throw, 47.18 m
- 12 June 1916, hammer throw, 47.57 m

Personal bests per event:

- shot put, 14.86 m, 19 July 1913
- two-handed shot put, 27.75 m, 19 July 1913
- discus throw, 47.18 m, 16 July 1916
- two-handed discus throw, 90.13 m, 20 July 1913
- hammer throw, 47.57 m, 12 June 1916
- javelin throw, 54.19 m, 12 June 1916
- weight throw, 10.76 m, 1914

== Personal ==
Niklander was born in Rutajärvi village in Hausjärvi on 18 January 1890 to father Konstantin Niklander (1848–1903) and mother Henriika née Harjula (1858–1942). His younger brother Siivo (1883–1961) made two Finnish national records in shot put in 1907.

Before the Finnish Civil War, Niklander joined the Hausjärvi White Guard and took part in the Mommila skirmish in November 1917. For this, the Red Guard sentenced him to death, and once the war began, he had to go into hiding.

Niklander died of stomach cancer on 12 November 1942.

== Links ==
- Elmer Niklander at Olympedia
