= Henning Möller =

Swedish discus thrower

Personal information
- Nationality: Swedish
- Born: 21 June 1885
- Died: 7 February 1968 (aged 82)

Sport
- Sport: Athletics
- Event: Discus throw

Henning Möller (21 June 1885 – 7 February 1968) was a Swedish athlete. He competed in the men's discus throw at the 1912 Summer Olympics.
