= Emil Welz =

German track and field athlete

Emil Welz (born 5 April 1879, date of death unknown) was a German track and field athlete who competed in the 1908 Summer Olympics and in the 1912 Summer Olympics. He was born in Finsterwalde.

In 1908, he finished eleventh in the discus throw competition. He also participated in the freestyle javelin event, but his result is unknown. Four years later he finished 24th in the discus throw competition.
