= Nikolaos Georgantas =

Greek athletics competitor

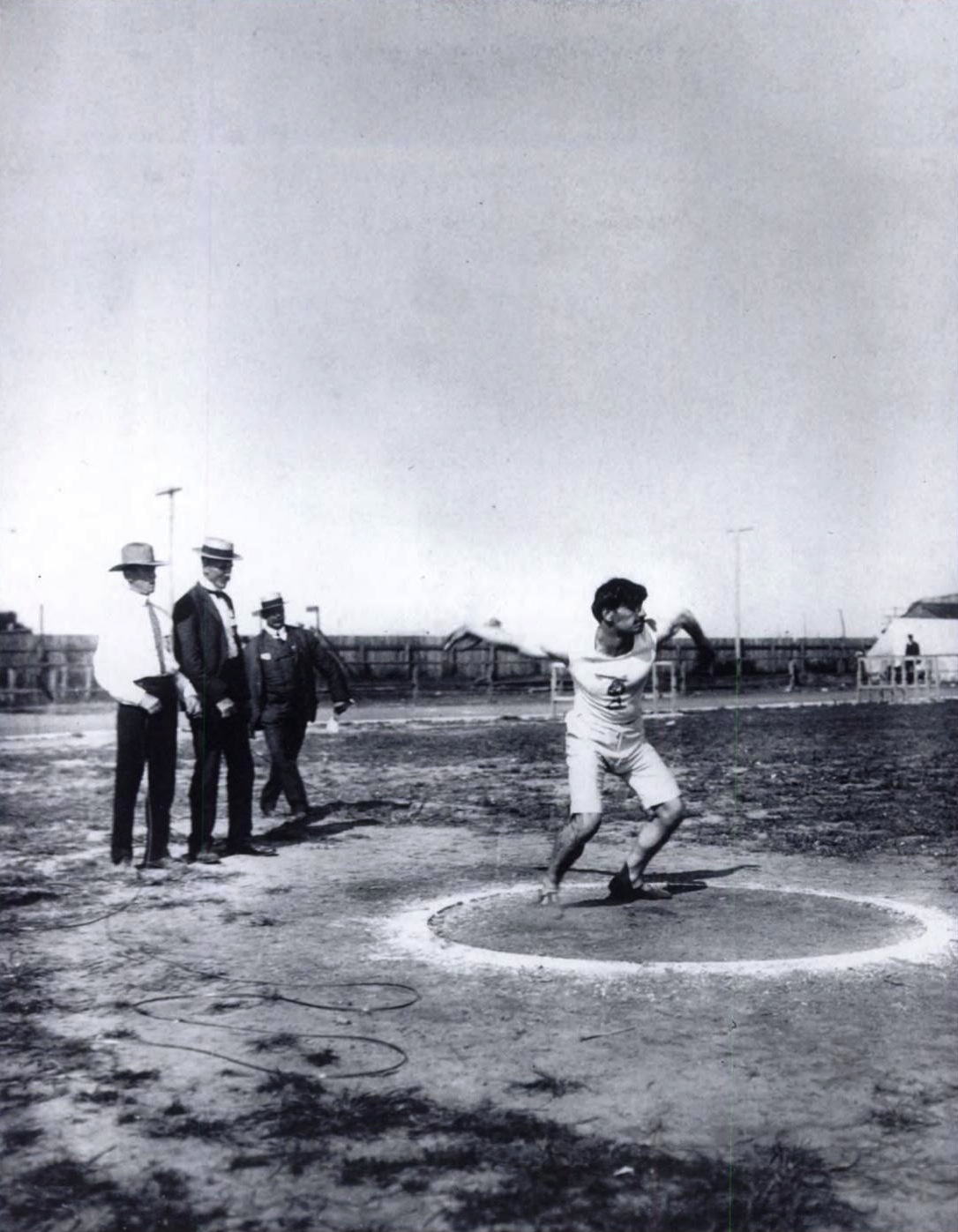
- Georgantas throwing a discus, 1904 Summer Olympics

Medal record

Men's athletics

Representing Greece

Olympic Games
Bronze medal – third place	1904 St Louis	Discus throw

Intercalated Games
Gold medal – first place	1906 Athens	Stone throw
Silver medal – second place	1906 Athens	Discus throw
Silver medal – second place	1906 Athens	Discus throw Greek style

Nikolaos Georgantas (Greek: Νικόλαος Γεωργαντάς, February 27, 1880 (OS)/March 12, 1880 (NS) – November 23, 1958) was a Greek athlete who competed mainly in the discus throw.

== Biography ==
He was born in Steno, Tripoli, Arcadia.

He competed for Greece in the 1904 Summer Olympics held in St. Louis, Missouri, in the discus throw where he won the Bronze medal. He also entered the shot-put, but after his first two attempts were called fouls for throwing, he withdrew in disgust.

Two years later in Athens, in his home country of Greece, he won the gold medal in the stone throw competition at the 1906 Intercalated Games. He added two silver medals in the Greek style discus throw (behind Finland’s Verner Järvinen) and in the normal discus again behind America's Martin Sheridan, who won his second consecutive Olympic title.

Georgantas was the first Greek flag bearer at the 1908 Summer Olympics in London. In his last participation at the Olympic Games he took sixth place in the discus with 33.21 metres.
