= Bill Horr =

American athlete and football coach (1880–1955)

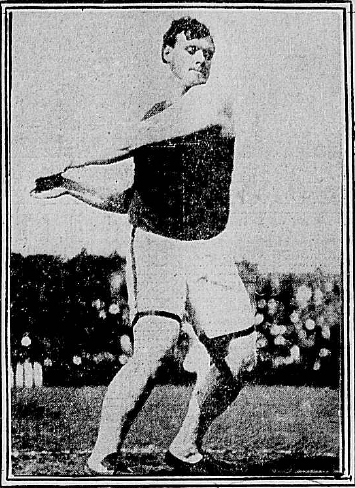
- Horr hurling the discus, 1907

Biographical details
- Born: May 2, 1880; Munnsville, New York, U.S.
- Died: July 1, 1955 (aged 75); Central Square, New York, U.S.

Playing career
- 1905–1908: Syracuse
- Position: Tackle (football)

Coaching career (HC unless noted)
- 1909: Northwestern
- 1910–1912: Purdue
- 1914–1923: Syracuse (line)

Head coaching record
- Overall: 6–14–1

Accomplishments and honors

Awards
- Consensus All-American (1908); Second-team All-American (1907)
Medal record
Men's athletics
Representing the United States
Olympic Games
Silver medal – second place	1908 London	Greek discus
Bronze medal – third place	1908 London	Discus throw

Marquis Franklin "Bill" Horr (May 2, 1880 – July 1, 1955) was an American college football player and coach and Olympic track and field athlete.

Franklin played football as a tackle at Syracuse University and was selected as an All-American in 1908. At Syracuse, Horr also competed in track and field. At the 1908 Summer Olympics in London, he won a silver medal in the Greek Style discus throw and a bronze in the freestyle discus throw. Horr served as the head football coach at Northwestern University in 1909 and at Purdue University from 1910 to 1912, compiling a career college football coaching record of 6–14–1.

== Head coaching record ==
Year	Team	Overall	Conference	Standing	Bowl/playoffs
Northwestern Purple (Western Conference) (1909)
1909	Northwestern	1–3–1	1–3	T–5th	
Northwestern:		1–3–1	1–3		
Purdue Boilermakers (Western Conference) (1910–1912)
1910	Purdue	1–5	0–4	8th	
1911	Purdue	3–4	1–3	6th	
1912	Purdue	1–2*	0–2*	T–3rd	
Purdue:		5–11	1–9		
Total:		6–14–1			
*Fired after three games.
