= James Barrett (athlete) =

Irish track and field athlete

Personal information
- Born: 17 December 1879 Rahela, Ballyduff, Ireland
- Died: 27 July 1942 (aged 62) St. Pancras, London, England

Sport
- Sport: Athletics
- Event: discus / shot put
- Club: Polytechnic Harriers

James Joseph Barrett (17 December 1879 – 27 July 1942) was an Irish track and field athlete who represented Great Britain at the 1908 Summer Olympics.

== Biography ==
Barrett was born in Rahela, Ballyduff, County Kerry, Ireland and worked as a Royal Irish Constabulary officer. He was the brother of Edward Barrett.

Barrett represented Great Britain at the 1908 Summer Olympics in London, where he participated in the Greek discus throw event and in the shot put competition, but in both contests his distances thrown are unknown.

Barrett won the British AAA Championships title in the shot put event at the 1911 AAA Championships. He finished third behind Einar Nilsson in the shot put event at the 1913 AAA Championships.

After the war, Barrett continued to compete at elite level and finished second behind Wesley Coe in the 56lb weight throw event at the 1920 AAA Championships and winning the shot put event at the 1923 AAA Championships.
