= Armas Taipale =

Finnish athlete

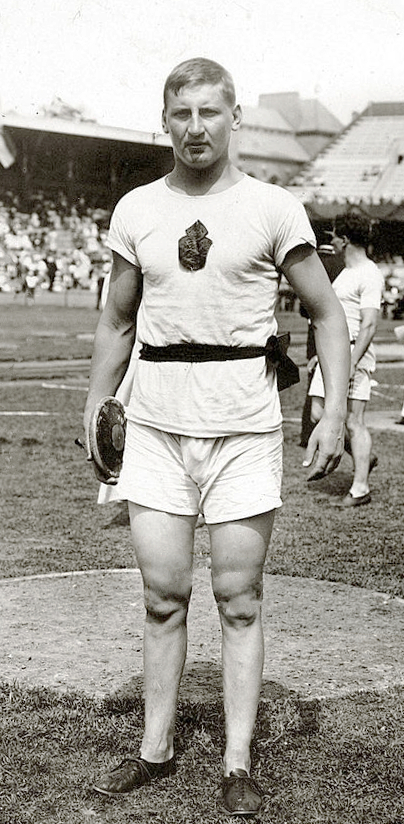
- Taipale at the 1912 Olympics

Personal information
- Born: 27 July 1890 Helsinki, Finland
- Died: 9 November 1976 (aged 86) Turku, Finland
- Height: 1.91 m (6 ft 3 in)
- Weight: 90–95 kg (198–209 lb)

Sport
- Sport: Athletics
- Events: Discus throw, shot put
- Club: HKV, Helsinki

Achievements and titles
- Personal bests: DT – 48.90 m (1914); SP – 13.855 m (1919);
Medal record
Representing Finland
Olympic Games
Gold medal – first place	1912 Stockholm	Discus throw
Gold medal – first place	1912 Stockholm	Two-handed discus throw
Silver medal – second place	1920 Antwerp	Discus throw

Armas Rudolf Taipale (27 July 1890 – 9 November 1976) was a Finnish athlete, who competed at three Olympic Games in 1912, 1920 and 1924 and won two gold medals and a silver medal.

== Career ==
Taipale started competing in 1908 and won three Finnish titles in the discus throw and two in the shot put.

At the 1912 Olympic Games he won gold medals in two discus throw events, conventional and two-handed, where the total was counted as a sum of best throws with a left hand and with a right hand.

In 1914, he won the British AAA Championships title in both shot put and discus throw at the 1914 AAA Championships.

After World War I, he won a silver medal in the conventional discus throw at the 1920 Summer Olympics and finished tenth in the shot put. At the 1924 Summer Olympics, he competed only in the discus throw and finished in 12th place.

Taipale set two unofficial world records in the discus.

Besides athletics, he competed in Greco-Roman wrestling at the Nordic Games and played association football. In 1923, he immigrated to the United States but returned to Finland in 1974. He was a businessman and lawyer by occupation.
