= Wilhelm Dörr =

German track and field athlete (1881–1955)

Medal record

Men's tug of war

Representing Germany

Intercalated Games
Gold medal – first place	1906 Athens	Team

Wilhelm "Willy" Dörr (7 August 1881 – 5 April 1955) was a German track and field athlete and tug of war competitor who competed in the 1906 Intercalated Games. He was born and died in Frankfurt am Main. In 1906, he was part of the German team which won the gold medal in the tug of war competition. In the ancient pentathlon contest he finished 16th and he also participated in the discus throw event but his result is unknown.

Records
Preceded by (United States) Martin Sheridan	Men's Discus Throw World Record Holder; 1907 – 23 August 1908	Succeeded by (United States) Martin Sheridan
