= Charles Lagarde =

French discus thrower

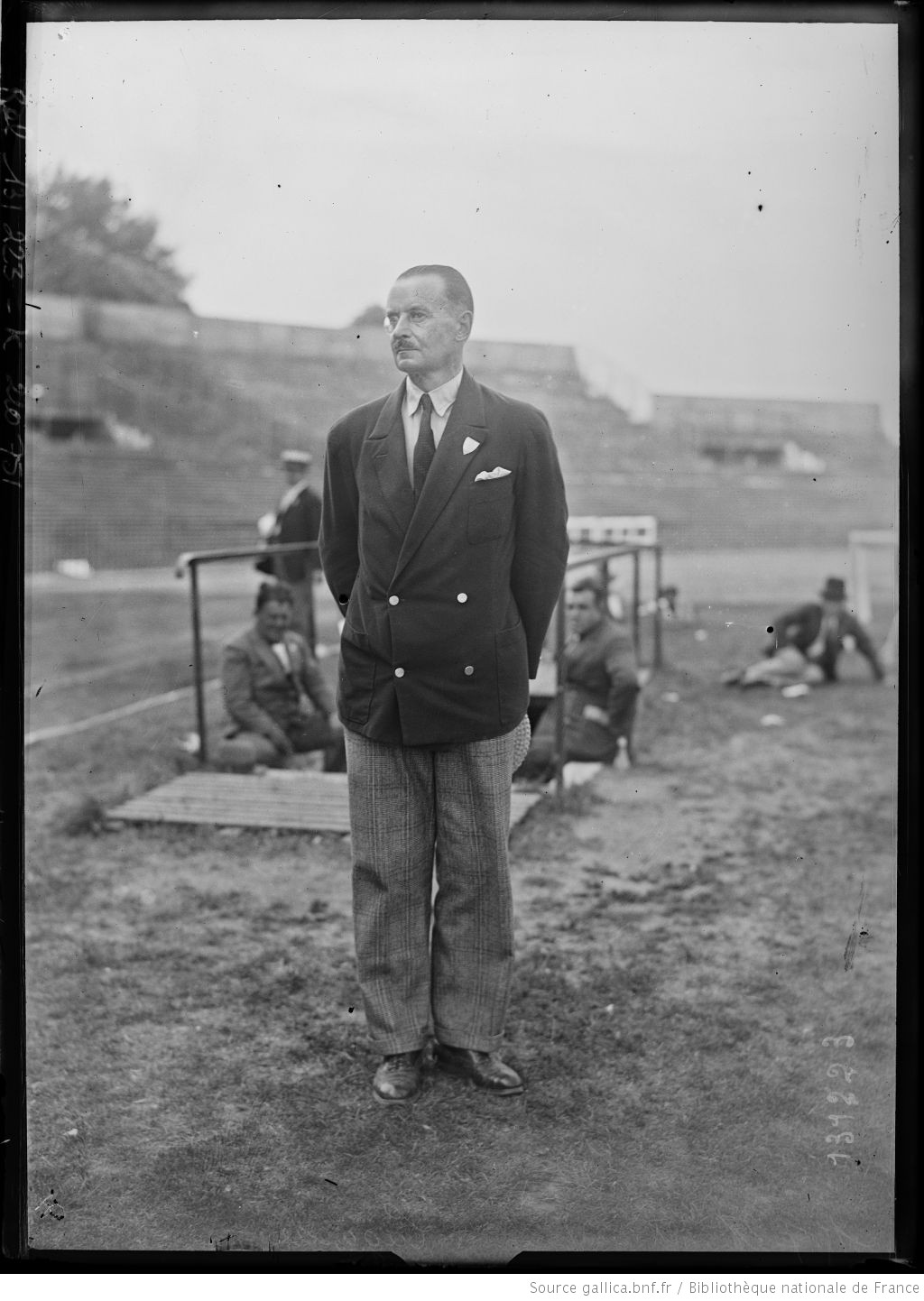

Personal information
- Nationality: French
- Born: 13 September 1878
- Died: 18 April 1954 (aged 75)

Sport
- Sport: Athletics
- Event(s): Discus; Shot put

Charles Lagarde (13 September 1878 – 18 April 1954) was a French athlete. He competed in the discus throw and shot put at the 1908 Summer Olympics and the 1912 Summer Olympics.

== Biography ==
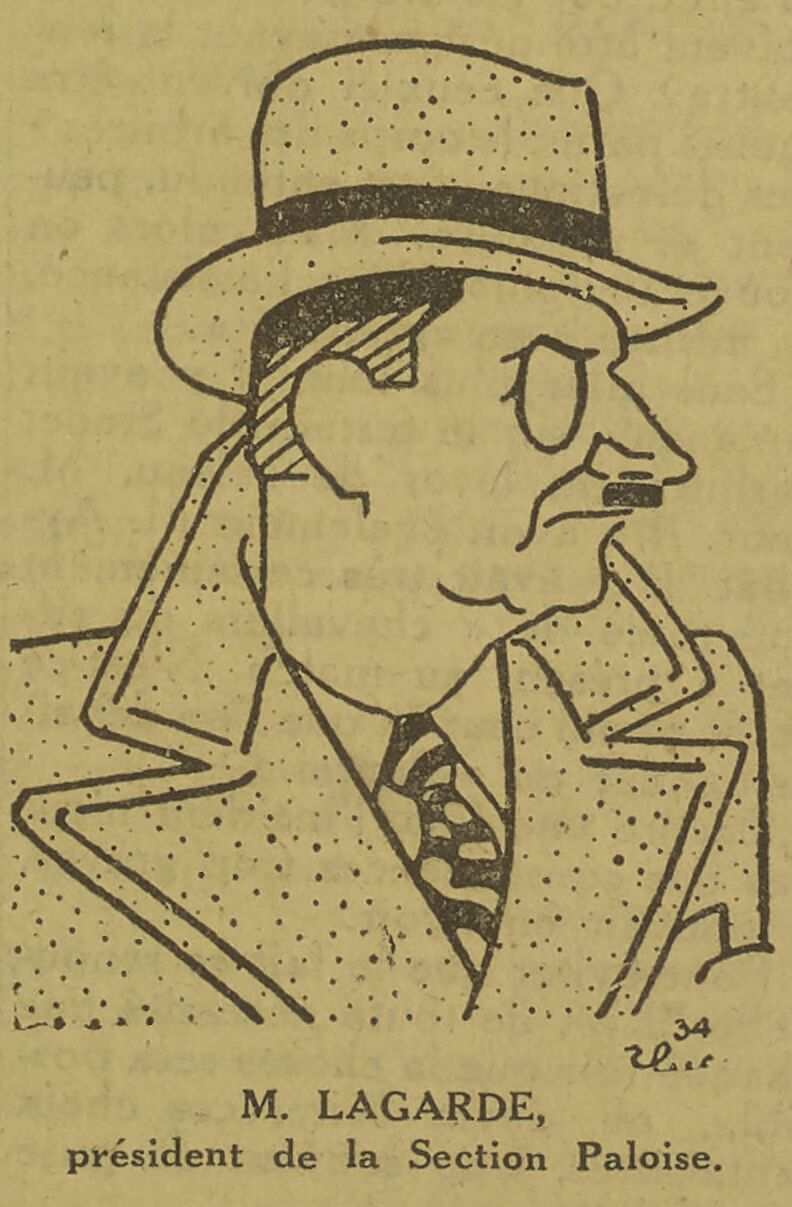
Sketch of Lagarde

He represented France twice at the Olympic Games in the discus and shot put events. He competed a first time at London in 1908 and a second time at Stockholm in 1912. His best results in the competition were 22nd place in the shot put and 27th place in the discus throw. In 1912, he led the French delegation when the athletes entered the Olympic stadium.

He managed to win three bronze medals at the French Athletics Championships in 1909, 1910 and 1911.

Lagarde served in World War I, beginning in August 1914. He was awarded the croix de guerre with a bronze star for his actions during the conflict.

Lagarde was between 1932 and 1952 the president of the Section paloise. He was also the President of the Basque-Béarn-Bigorre league.

In 1981, a street was named after him in Pau, Pyrénées-Atlantiques.
