= Ralph Rose =

American track and field athlete (1885–1913)

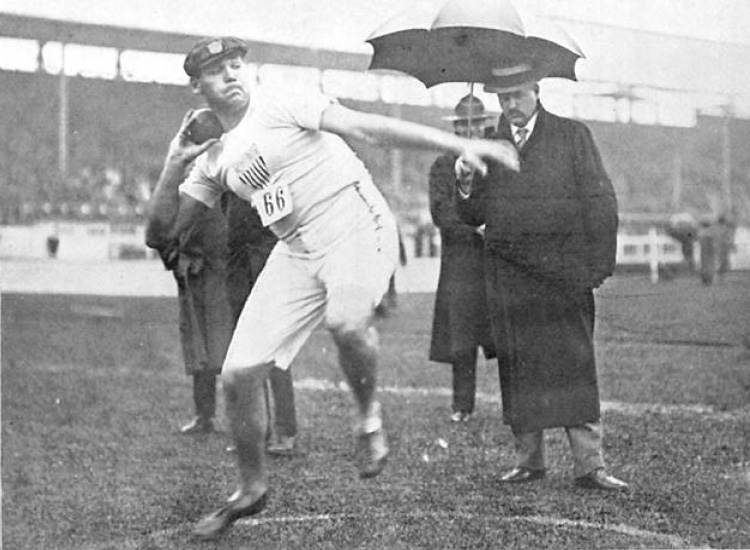
- Ralph Rose

Personal information
- Full name: Ralph Waldo Rose
- Born: March 17, 1885 Healdsburg, California, U.S.
- Died: October 16, 1913 (aged 28) San Francisco, California, U.S.
- Height: 6 ft 6 in (198 cm)
- Weight: 235 lb (107 kg; 16 st 11 lb)

Sport
- Sport: Track and field
- Events: Discus throw Hammer throw Shot put Tug of war Weight throw

Achievements and titles
- Personal bests: Shot put: 15.54 metres (51.0 ft) (1909); Discus throw: 40.81 metres (133.9 ft) (1910); Hammer throw: 52.61 metres (172.6 ft) (1907)
Medal record
Men's athletics
Representing the United States
Olympic Games
Gold medal – first place	1904 St. Louis	Shot put
Gold medal – first place	1908 London	Shot put
Gold medal – first place	1912 Stockholm	Two handed shot put
Silver medal – second place	1904 St. Louis	Discus throw
Silver medal – second place	1912 Stockholm	Shot put
Bronze medal – third place	1904 St. Louis	Hammer throw

Ralph Waldo Rose (March 17, 1885 – October 16, 1913) was an American track and field athlete. He was born in Healdsburg, California. With six Olympic medals, Rose is one of the most successful track and field Olympians of all time.

== Biography ==
Standing 6 ft 5.5 in (197 cm) and weighing 250 pounds (115 kg), Rose was the first shot putter to break 50 feet (15 m). His world record of 51 ft 0 in (15.5 m), set in 1909, lasted for 16 years. In 1904, while at the University of Michigan, he won both the shot put and discus at the Big Ten championships. He subsequently competed for the Olympic Club in San Francisco, California and won seven National AAU titles in the shot, discus, and javelin. A competitor in three Olympic Games, Rose compiled a medal total of three golds, two silver, and one bronze. At the 1904 Summer Olympics in St. Louis, Missouri, he won the shot, was second in the discus, third in the hammer throw, and sixth in the 56-pound (25 kg) weight throw.

Four years later at the 1908 Summer Olympics in London, he repeated as the shot put champion. At the opening ceremony Rose, the U.S. flag bearer, refused (supported by a majority of his mostly Irish-American teammates) to dip the flag towards the royal box, as athletes from other countries did. Fellow athlete Martin Sheridan supposedly explained Rose's action with the terse statement, "This flag dips to no earthly king." According to legend, this caused acrimony between the United States and Great Britain. Several decisions by British judges went against American athletes during the games, and U.S. spokesmen felt they stemmed from bias, caused in part by the flag incident. However, there is no reliable evidence that the British spectators objected to Rose's action, nor that Sheridan ever uttered his famous quote, which did not appear in print until 1952.

At the 1908 Summer Olympics Rose competed in the tug of war but was not successful.

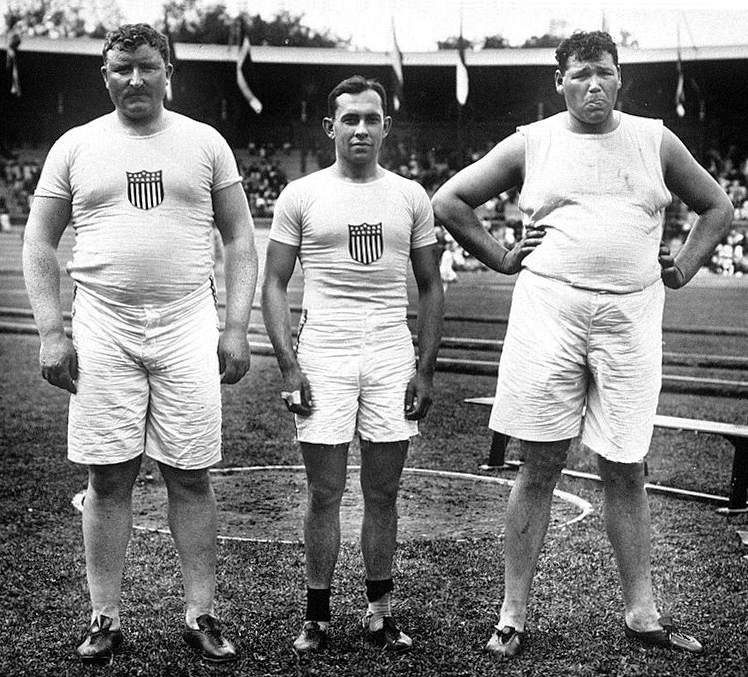
Pat McDonald, Lawrence Whitney, and Ralph Rose in 1912.

In the 1912 Olympics in Stockholm, Sweden, he won the two-handed shot put (throwing a total of 27.70 m (90 ft 10.5 in) with his right and left hands), took second in the regular shot, ninth in the hammer and 11th in the discus.

At the age of 28 he died of typhoid fever, in San Francisco.

Olympic Games
Preceded by Matthew Halpin	Flagbearer for United States; London 1908	Succeeded by George Bonhag
Records
Preceded by Incumbent	Men's Shot Put World Record Holder; August 21, 1909 – May 6, 1928	Succeeded by Emil Hirschfeld
