= Michalis Dorizas =

Greek athlete (1886–1957)

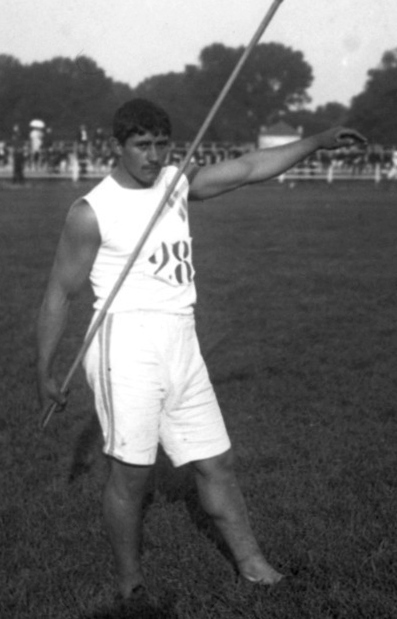
- Dorizas in 1908

Personal information
- Born: 16 April 1886 Constantinople, Turkey
- Died: 21 October 1957 (aged 71) Philadelphia, United States
- Education: Robert College, University of Pennsylvania
- Height: 1.77 m (5 ft 10 in)
- Weight: 106 kg (234 lb)

Sport
- Sport: Athletics
- Events: Shot put, discus throw, javelin throw
- Club: Athletic Association of Robert College, Constantinople

Achievements and titles
- Personal bests: SP – 13.57 m (1914); DT – 42.15 m (1912); JT – 55.10 m (1907)
Medal record
Representing Greece
Olympic Games
Silver medal – second place	1908 London	Freestyle javelin

Michális Dórizas (Greek: Μιχάλης Δώριζας; 16 April 1886 – 21 October 1957) was a Greek athlete who competed in throwing events at the 1906, 1908 and 1912 Summer Olympics. He won a silver medal in the javelin throw in 1908 and a bronze in the stone throw in 1906. In the discus throw, his best achievement was fifth place in 1908; in the shot put, he placed 11th in 1912.

Dorizas was born to Greek parents in Constantinople, where he graduated from the Robert College. In 1913, he moved to the United States to study at the University of Pennsylvania. In the U.S., he soon became one of the best heavyweight wrestlers, winning the intercollegiate championships in 1914-1916. He also played as an American football guard for two years and continued to compete in throwing events. During World War I, he served as a U.S. Army Sergeant in France, and after the war as a Greek-Turkish-English interpreter at the Paris Peace Conference, 1919, and as a geographer with the American Section of the International Commission on Mandates.

In 1915, he received a master's degree in philosophy and began teaching geography and working on his PhD (which he received in 1924). He was voted as the most popular Penn professor for several years. In 1943, the Friars Senior Society called him "the faculty member who the greatest service to the University during the course of the year." He continued teaching at Penn until his death in 1957.
