= Martin Sheridan =

Athletics competitor

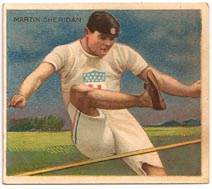
- Martin Sheridan

Medal record

Men's athletics

Representing the United States

Olympic Games
Gold medal – first place	1904 St Louis	Discus throw
Gold medal – first place	1908 London	Discus throw
Gold medal – first place	1908 London	Greek discus
Bronze medal – third place	1908 London	Standing long jump

Intercalated Games
Gold medal – first place	1906 Athens	Discus throw
Gold medal – first place	1906 Athens	Shot put
Silver medal – second place	1906 Athens	Standing high jump
Silver medal – second place	1906 Athens	Standing long jump
Silver medal – second place	1906 Athens	Stone throw

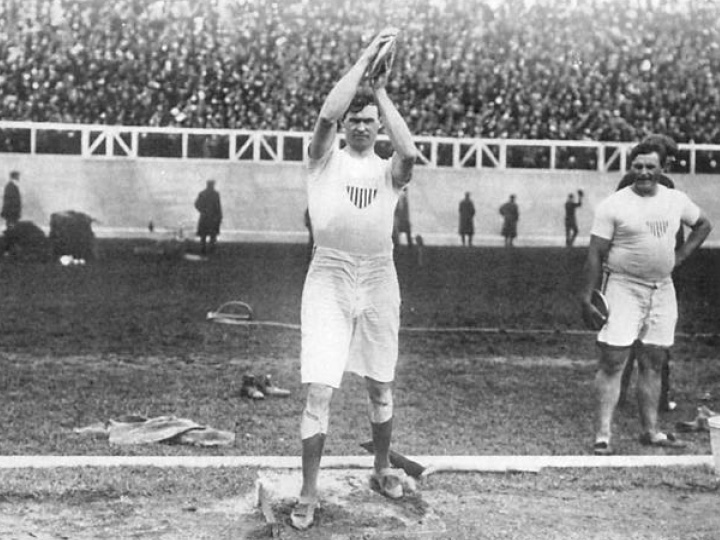
Martin Sheridan preparing to win the discus event at the 1908 Olympic Games in London.

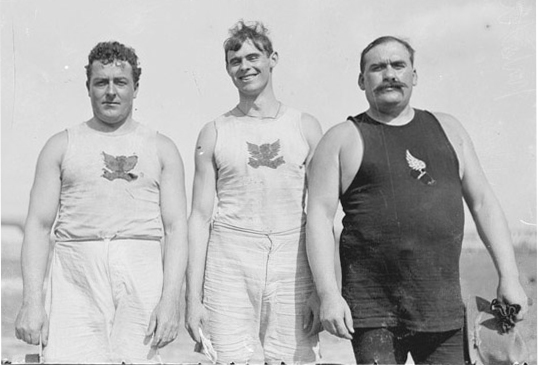
John Flanagan and Martin Sheridan of the Irish American Athletic Club, with fellow Irishman James Mitchell of the New York Athletic Club at the 1904 Olympic Games in St. Louis, Missouri.

Martin John Sheridan (March 28, 1881 – March 27, 1918) was an Irish-American athlete and three time Olympic Games gold medallist in discus throw.

Born in Bohola, County Mayo, Ireland, he was a participant of both the 1904 and the 1908 Olympic Games, and was part of a group of Irish-American athletes known as the "Irish Whales".

He died on 27 March 1918, at St. Vincent's Hospital in Manhattan, New York, the day before his 37th birthday, from the Spanish flu pandemic. He is buried in Calvary Cemetery, Queens, New York.

== Career ==
At 6 ft 3 in (191 cm) and 194 lbs (88 kg), Sheridan was the best all-around athlete of the Irish American Athletic Club, and like many of his teammates, served with the New York City Police Department (from 1906 until his death in 1918). Sheridan was so well respected in the NYPD, that he served as the Governor's personal bodyguard when the governor was in New York City.

A five-time Olympic gold medalist, with a total of nine Olympic medals, Sheridan was called "one of the greatest figures that ever represented this country in international sport, as well as being one of the most popular who ever attained the championship honor." He won the discus throw event at the 1904, 1906, and 1908 Summer Olympics as well as the shot put at the 1906 Olympics and the Greek discus in 1908. At the 1906 Intercalated Games in Athens he also won silver medals in the standing high jump, standing long jump and the stone throw.

In 1907, Sheridan won the National Amateur Athletic Union discus championship and the Canadian championship, and in 1908 he won the Metropolitan, National and Canadian championships as well as two gold medals in the discus throw and bronze in the standing long jump at the 1908 Olympic Games.

Two of Martin Sheridan's gold medals from the 1904 Olympic Games in St. Louis, Missouri and one of his medals from the 1906 Olympic Games in Athens, Greece, are currently located in the USA Track & Field's Hall of Fame History Gallery, in Washington Heights, Manhattan.

== Legacy ==
It is often claimed that Sheridan fueled a controversy in London in 1908, when flagbearer Ralph Rose refused to dip the flag to King Edward VII. Sheridan is supposed to have supported Rose by explaining "This flag dips to no earthly king," and it is claimed that his statement exemplified both Irish and American defiance of the British monarchy. However, careful research has shown that this was first reported in 1952. Sheridan himself made no mention of it in his published reports on the Games and neither did his obituary.

The inscription on the granite Celtic Cross monument marking Martin Sheridan's grave in Calvary Cemetery, Queens, New York says in part: "Devoted to the Institutions of his Country, and the Ideals and Aspirations of his Race. Athlete. Patriot."

According to his obituary in the New York Times, Sheridan was "one of the greatest athletes the United States has ever known".
