= Denmark at the 1906 Intercalated Games =

Denmark at the Olympics

- IOC code: DEN
- NOC: National Olympic Committee and Sports Confederation of Denmark

in Athens
- Competitors: 49 in 8 sports
- Medals Ranked 11th: Gold 3 Silver 2 Bronze 1 Total 6

Summer appearances
- 1896; 1900; 1904; 1908; 1912; 1920; 1924; 1928; 1932; 1936; 1948; 1952; 1956; 1960; 1964; 1968; 1972; 1976; 1980; 1984; 1988; 1992; 1996; 2000; 2004; 2008; 2012; 2016; 2020; 2024; 2028

Winter appearances
- 1948; 1952; 1956; 1960; 1964; 1968; 1972–1984; 1988; 1992; 1994; 1998; 2002; 2006; 2010; 2014; 2018; 2022; 2026

Denmark competed at the 1906 Intercalated Games in Athens, Greece. 49 athletes, all men, competed in 24 events in 8 sports.

== Medallists ==
Medal	Name	Sport	Event	Date
1st place, gold medalist(s)	Søren Jensen	Wrestling	Heavyweight	April 28
1st place, gold medalist(s)	Søren Jensen	Wrestling	All-round	April 30
1st place, gold medalist(s)	Aage Andersen; Vigo Andersen; Charles Buchwald; Parmo Ferslev; Holger Frederiksen; Hjalmar Herup; August Lindgren; Oscar Nielsen; Carl Pedersen; Peder Pedersen; Henry Rambusch; Stefan Rasmussen	Football	Football	April 25
2nd place, silver medalist(s)	Carl Carlsen	Wrestling	Lightweight	April 26
2nd place, silver medalist(s)	Carl Andersen; Halvor Birch; Harald Bukdahl; Kaj Gnudtzmann; Knud Holm; Erik Klem; Harald Klem; Louis Larsen; Jens Lorentzen; Robert Madsen; Carl Manicus-Hansen; Oluf Olsson; Hans Pedersen; Oluf Pedersen; Niels Petersen; Viktor Rasmussen; Marius Skram-Jensen; Marius Thuesen	Gymnastics	Team All-round	April 23
3rd place, bronze medalist(s)	Robert Behrens	Wrestling	Middleweight	April 27

== Athletics ==
Track

Athlete	Events	Heat		Semifinals		Final	
Athlete	Events	Result	Rank	Result	Rank	Result	Rank
Otto Bock	100 metres	Unknown	2 Q	Unknown	3	did not advance	
Aage Petersen	100 metres	Unknown	Unknown	did not advance			
Aage Petersen	400 metres	Unknown	3	did not advance			
Valdemar Lorentzen	Marathon	n/a				did not finish	

Field

Athlete	Events	Final	
Athlete	Events	Result	Rank
Aage Petersen	High Jump	Unknown	Unknown
Niels Løw	High Jump	Unknown	Unknown
Otto Bock	High Jump	Unknown	Unknown
Aage Petersen	Long Jump	5.555	21
Niels Løw	Long Jump	5.470	22
Otto Bock	Long Jump	5.770	15
Aage Petersen	Standing Long Jump	2.555	25
Niels Løw	Standing Long Jump	2.520	27
Niels Løw	Triple Jump	12.000	14

== Cycling ==
Athlete	Events	Heat		Final	
Athlete	Events	Result	Rank	Result	Rank
Carl Andresen	Individual road race	n/a		Unknown	7
Carl Andresen	20 Kilometres	did not finish		did not advance	

== Fencing ==
Athlete	Events	Heat Group	Semifinal Group	Final Group
Athlete	Events	Rank	Rank	Rank
Herbert Sander	Individual Foil	1 Q	Unknown	did not advance
Villiam Wilkenschildt	Individual Foil	Unknown	did not advance	
Magnus Jensen	Individual Épée	3	did not advance	
Villiam Wilkenschildt	Individual Épée	Unknown	did not advance	
Herbert Sander	Individual Sabre	1 Q	Unknown	did not advance

== Football ==
Smyrna were a team from the Ottoman Empire, although none of the players were from Turkey and actually included some English players, the final against Greek side Athens was abandoned at half-time with the Danish team leading 9-0, the Greeks refused to come out for the second half.

- Squad

- Aage Andersen
- Vigo Andersen
- Charles Buchwald
- Parmo Ferslev
- Holger Frederiksen
- Hjalmar Herup
- August Lindgren
- Oscar Nielsen
- Carl Pedersen
- Peder Pedersen
- Henry Rambusch
- Stefan Rasmussen

Semifinals

23 April 1906
12:00

Denmark	5–1	Smyrna
	Report

Podilatodromio, Athens
Attendance: 3000
Referee: Gösta Drake (Sweden)

Final

24 April 1906
12:00

Denmark	9–0 Awarded	(Greece) Athens
1' 7' 19' 22' 24' 26' 27' 34' 40'	Report

Podilatodromio, Athens
Referee: Gösta Drake (Sweden)

Final rank
Gold

== Gymnastics ==
In the team all-round event, teams could consist of between 8 and 20 gymnasts, Denmark won the silver medal behind Norway.

- Team

- Carl Andersen
- Halvor Birch
- Harald Bukdahl
- Kaj Gnudtzmann
- Knud Holm
- Erik Klem
- Harald Klem
- Louis Larsen
- Jens Lorentzen
- Robert Madsen
- Carl Manicus-Hansen
- Oluf Olsson
- Hans Pedersen
- Oluf Pedersen
- Niels Petersen
- Viktor Rasmussen
- Marius Skram-Jensen
- Marius Thuesen

== Rowing ==
Athlete	Events	Final	
Athlete	Events	Result	Rank
Frederik Bielefeldt; Emanuel Saugman; Knud Bay	Coxed pairs (1 km)	Unknown	Unknown
Hannibal Østergaard; Henning Rasmussen; Harald Steinthal	Coxed pairs (1 mile)	Unknown	4
Frederik Bielefeldt; Emanuel Saugman; Knud Bay; Hannibal Østergaard; Henning Rasmussen	Coxed fours	Unknown	4

== Swimming ==
Athlete	Events	Heat		Final	
Athlete	Events	Result	Rank	Result	Rank
Ludvig Dam	100 metres freestyle	Unknown	6	did not advance	
Hjalmar Saxtorph	400 metres freestyle	n/a		did not finish	
Hjalmar Saxtorph	One mile freestyle	n/a		38:24.0	11

== Wrestling ==
Greco-Roman

Athlete	Event	Round 1	Quarterfinals	Semifinals	Final Group		
Athlete	Event	Opposition Result	Opposition Result	Opposition Result	Opposition Result	Opposition Result	Rank
Carl Carlsen	Lightweight	Colombani (EGY); W	n/a	Halík (BOH); W	Holubán (HUN); W	Watzl (AUT); L	2nd place, silver medalist(s)
Robert Behrens	Middleweight	Höltl (AUT); W	Hradecký (BOH); W	Goldbach (AUT); W	Weckman (FIN); W	Lindmayer (AUT); L	3rd place, bronze medalist(s)
Søren Jensen	Heavyweight	bye	Rondi (GER); W	Dubois (BEL); W	n/a	Baur (AUT); W	1st place, gold medalist(s)
Søren Jensen	All-Round	n/a			Watzl (AUT); W	Weckman (FIN); W	1st place, gold medalist(s)
