= Wrestling at the 1906 Intercalated Games =

At the 1906 Summer Olympics in Athens, four wrestling events were contested, all in Greco-Roman style for men. Now called the Intercalated Games, the 1906 Games are no longer considered as an official Olympic Games by the International Olympic Committee.

== Medal summary ==
Games	Gold	Silver	Bronze
Lightweight	Rudolf Watzl; Austria	Karl Karlsen; Denmark	Ferenc Holubán; Hungary
Middleweight	Verner Weckman; Finland	Rudolf Lindmayer; Austria	Robert Behrens; Denmark
Heavyweight	Søren Marinus Jensen; Denmark	Henri Baur; Austria	Marcel Dubois; Belgium
Overall	Søren Marinus Jensen; Denmark	Verner Weckman; Finland	Rudolf Watzl; Austria

== Medal table ==
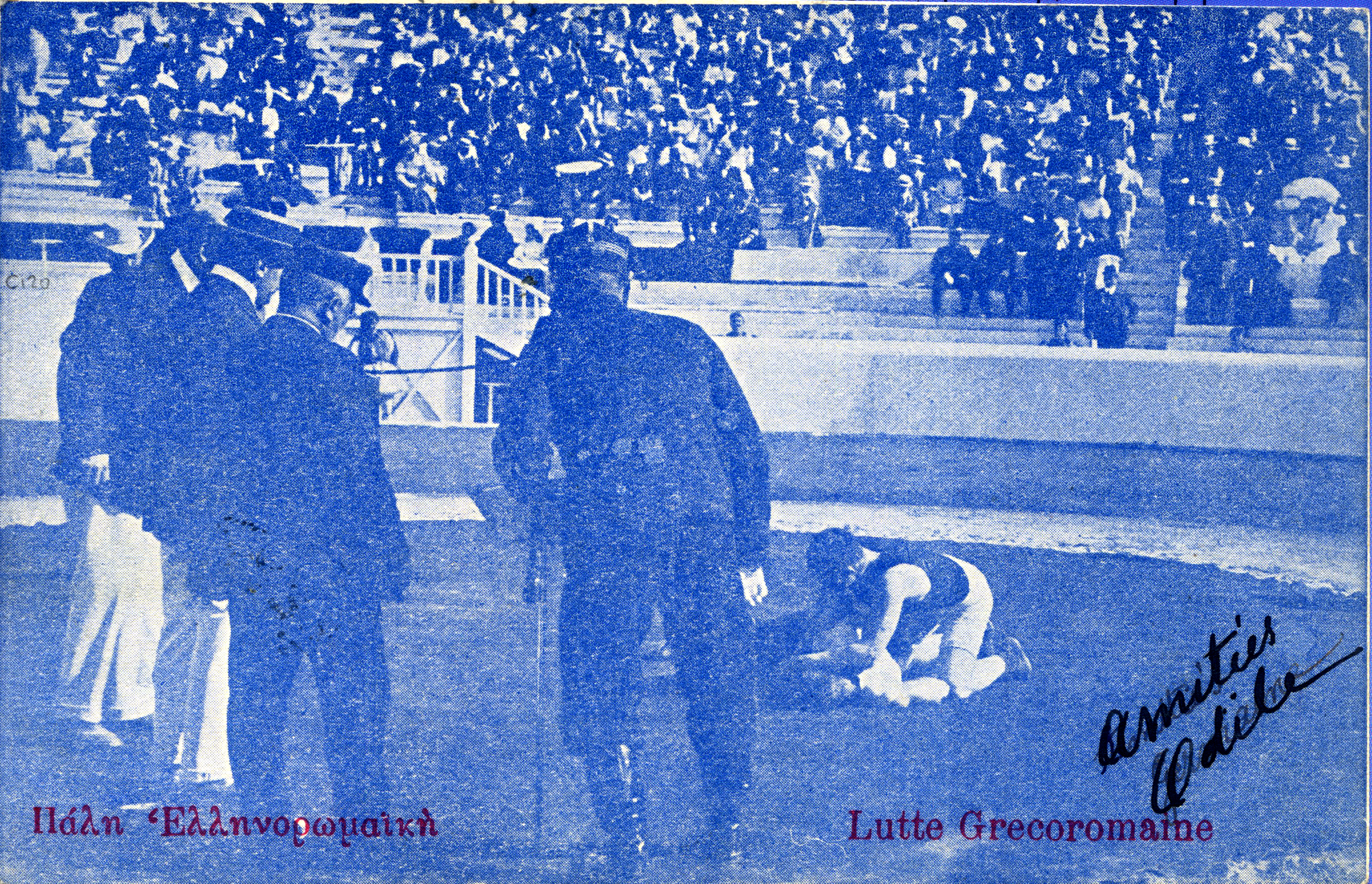
Greek-roman wrestling. Post card of 1906, published by Aspiotis.

Rank	Nation	Gold	Silver	Bronze	Total
1	Denmark	2	1	1	4
2	Austria	1	2	1	4
3	Finland	1	1	0	2
4	Belgium	0	0	1	1
4	Hungary	0	0	1	1
Totals (5 entries)		4	4	4	12

== See also ==
- List of World and Olympic Champions in men's freestyle wrestling
- List of World and Olympic Champions in Greco-Roman wrestling
