= Trondhjems TF =

Norwegian gymnastics club

Logo.

Trondhjems Turnforening, often called Trondhjems Turn, is a Norwegian gymnastics club from Trondheim.

The club was founded on 14 February 1858, and is therefore Norway's fourth oldest sports club after Oslo TF (founded 1855), Arendal TF and Drammens TF (both founded 1857).

Gymnast Karl Aas who represented the club won an Olympic silver medal in 1920. The brothers Rasmus and Thorleif Petersen also represented the club, and won gold medals at the 1906 Intercalated Games.

In the first years the club practised both shooting, skiing, speed skating, fencing and rowing. The club has concentrated on gymnastics since the mid-1870s. Some sports have since split out and created their own clubs, such as the Trondhjems Skiklub and Trondhjems Skytterlag.
