= Konstantinos Kozanitas =

Greek gymnast (1880–1954)

- Κωνσταντίνος Κοζανιτας
- Born: 1880
- Died: 1954 (aged 73–74)

Gymnastics career
- Discipline: Men's artistic gymnastics
- Country represented: Greece
- Gym: Panakhaikos Etairia Patron
Medal record
Men's artistic gymnastics
Representing Greece
Intercalated Games
Bronze medal – third place	1906 Athens	Rope climbing

Konstantinos Kozanitas (Greek: Κωνσταντίνος Κοζανιτάς, 1880–1954) was a Greek gymnast. He was a member of Gymnastiki Etaireia Patron, which merged in 1923 with Panachaikos Gymnastikos Syllogos to become Panachaiki Gymnastiki Enosi.

He competed in the Rope climbing event in the 1906 Intercalated Games in Athens. He finished third behind the Greek Georgios Aliprantis and the Hungarian Béla Erödy.
