= Oluf Pedersen =

Oluf Pedersen may refer to:

- Oluf Pedersen (gymnast) (1878–1917), Danish gymnast
- Oluf Pedersen (politician) (1891–1970), Danish politician
