= Gymnastics at the 1906 Intercalated Games =

At the 1906 Summer Olympics in Athens, four gymnastics events were contested, all for men only. Now called the Intercalated Games, the 1906 Games are no longer considered as an official Olympic Games by the International Olympic Committee.

== Medal summary ==
Games	Gold	Silver	Bronze
Individual all-around 5 events	Pierre Payssé; France	Alberto Braglia; Italy	Georges Charmoille; France
Individual all-around 6 events	Pierre Payssé; France	Alberto Braglia; Italy	Georges Charmoille; France
Rope climbing	Georgios Aliprantis; Greece	Béla Erödy; Hungary	Konstantinos Kozanitas; Greece
Team	Norway; Carl Albert Andersen; Oskar Bye; Conrad Carlsrud; Harald Eriksen; Oswald Falch; Kristian Fjerdingen; Yngvar Fredriksen; Karl Haagensen; Harald Halvorsen; Petter Hol; Andreas Hagelund; Eugen Ingebretsen; Per Mathias Jespersen; Finn Münster; Frithjof Olsen; Carl Alfred Pedersen; Rasmus Pettersen; Thorleif Petersen; Thorleiv Røhn; Johan Stumpf	Denmark; Carl Andersen; Halvor Birch; Harald Bukdahl; Kaj Gnudtzmann; Knud Holm; Erik Klem; Harald Klem; Louis Larsen; Jens Lorentzen; Robert Madsen; Carl Manicus-Hansen; Oluf Olsson; Hans Pedersen; Oluf Pedersen; Niels Petersen; Viktor Rasmussen; Marius Skram-Jensen; Marius Thuesen	Italy; Federico Bertinotti; Ciro Civinini; Raffaello Giannoni; Azeglio Innocenti; Filiberto Innocenti; Manrico Masetti; Vitaliano Masotti; Quintilio Mazzoncini; Spartaco Nerozzi

== Medal table ==
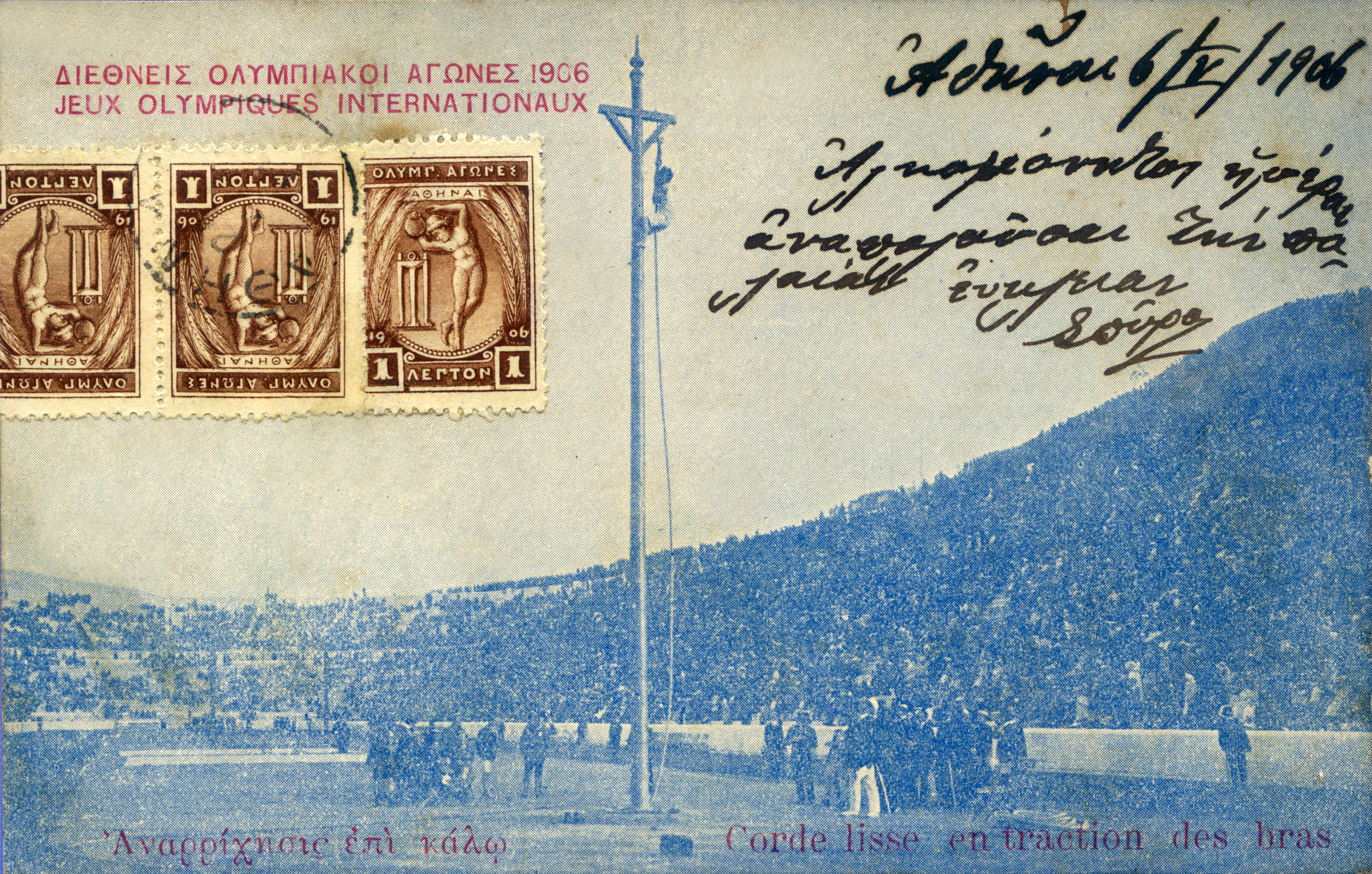
Rope climbing in the Panathenaic Stadium. Post card of 1906, published by Aspiotis.

Rank	Nation	Gold	Silver	Bronze	Total
1	France	2	0	2	4
2	Greece	1	0	1	2
3	Norway	1	0	0	1
4	Italy	0	2	1	3
5	Denmark	0	1	0	1
5	Hungary	0	1	0	1
Totals (6 entries)		4	4	4	12
