= Carl Pedersen =

Carl Pedersen may refer to:

- Carl Pedersen (footballer) (1891-1964), Norwegian footballer
- Carl Pedersen (gymnast) (1883–1971), Danish gymnast who competed in the 1912 Summer Olympics
- Carl Pedersen (rower) (1884–1968), Danish rower who competed in the 1912 Summer Olympics
- Carl Pedersen (sport shooter) (born 1888), Danish sport shooter
- Carl Alfred Pedersen (1882–1960), Norwegian gymnast and triple jumper who competed in the 1906, 1908 and 1912 Summer Olympics
- Carl Brisson (1895–1958), born Carl Frederik Ejnar Pedersen, Danish singer and actor

== See also ==
- Carl-Henning Pedersen (1913–2007), Danish painter
