= Finn Münster =

Norwegian gymnast

- Full name: Finn Rasmus Holmsen Münster
- Born: 20 January 1887 Skien, United Kingdoms of Sweden and Norway
- Died: 29 April 1965 (aged 78) Bærum, Norway

Gymnastics career
- Discipline: Men's artistic gymnastics
- Country represented: Norway
- Club: Odds Ballklubb
Medal record
Men's artistic gymnastics
Representing Norway
Intercalated Games
Gold medal – first place	1906 Athens	Team

Finn Rasmus Holmsen Münster (20 January 1887 – 29 April 1965) was a Norwegian gymnast who competed in the 1906 Summer Olympics.

In 1906 he won the gold medal as member of the Norwegian gymnastics team in the team competition.
