= Karen Margrete Andersen =

Danish diver (1917–1971)

Personal information
- Nationality: Danish
- Born: 23 January 1917 Guldborgsund, Denmark
- Died: 30 June 1971 (aged 54) Guldborgsund, Denmark
- Relative: Carl Andersen (father)

Sport
- Sport: Diving

Karen Margrete Andersen (23 January 1917 – 30 June 1971) was a Danish diver. She competed in the women's 10 metre platform event at the 1936 Summer Olympics.
