= Thyra Boldsen =

Danish sculptor

Thyra Valborg Boldsen (1884–1968) was a Danish sculptor who created works in a naturalistic style using many different types of stone. She was particularly successful in the United States after moving to California in 1931. Four of her works were installed in Los Angeles' Exposition Park in 1936. In the 1920s, she lectured on art and wrote books on philosophical questions and lifestyle. Her work was part of the sculpture event in the art competition at the 1932 Summer Olympics.

== Biography ==
Born on 2 January 1884 in Farum, Thyra Valborg Boldsen was the daughter of the farmer Frederik Svane Grundtzmann (1856–1922) and Mathea Christine Nielsen (1855–1891). In 1906, she married the engineer Kai Svane Gnudtzmann but the marriage was dissolved in 1915.

Boldsen began to train as a sculptor under Gunnar Jensen. After preparatory studies at the Arts and Crafts School for Women, she was admitted to the Royal Danish Academy of Fine Arts in 1903. As a result of the additional year she spent at the École des Beaux-Arts in Paris (1905–06), she graduated from the academy in 1912. She travelled to Greece and Italy in 1915. She was a regular exhibitor at the Charlottenborg Spring Exhibitions from 1907 to 1932. When the Danish Society of Female Artists was founded in 1916, she became one of the early members and exhibited at their retrospective exhibition in 1920. In 1918, she exhibited three statues in Hellerup's Øregårdsparken, including one in white marble from Paros titled "Kvindernes Valgret" or Votes for Women. Saddened by the cruelty of the First World War, she opened her home to refugees and became interested in philosophy as a way to promote peace. She became especially interested in the work of Harald Høffding and took private lessons in philosophy.

It was in the United States that Boldsen was most successful. She first visited the country in 1926. After several more trips, she settled in California in 1931 and remained there for the rest of her life. She created busts of famous people including the aviator Charles Lindbergh and the Japanese dancer Michio Itō. Other works included The Melody of Life and The World Mother (1932). The Melody of Life, together with three other works, was installed in Exposition Park in Los Angeles. At the time, Boldsen commented: "In conceiving and executing these four figures dedicated to womanhood and motherhood, I have had in mind that men for centuries have erected statues symbolizing bravery—these symbolize love, life and joy." After her death in 1968, the statues were taken to Denmark.

Thyra Boldsen died in Monrovia, California, on 22 September 1968.
