= Thorleif Petersen =

Norwegian artistic gymnast (1884–1958)

- Born: 6 July 1884 Trondheim, United Kingdoms of Sweden and Norway
- Died: 22 December 1958 (aged 74) Trondheim, Norway
- Relatives: Rasmus Petersen (brother)

Gymnastics career
- Discipline: Men's artistic gymnastics
- Country represented: Norway
- Gym: Trondhjems TF
Medal record
Men's artistic gymnastics
Representing Norway
Intercalated Games
Gold medal – first place	1906 Athens	Team

Thorleif Petersen (6 July 1884 – 22 February 1958) was a Norwegian gymnast who competed in the 1906 Summer Olympics.

In 1906 he won the gold medal as member of the Norwegian gymnastics team in the team competition. He was a brother of fellow gold medallist Rasmus Petersen, and represented the club Trondhjems TF.
