= Harald Halvorsen (gymnast) =

Norwegian artistic gymnast

- Born: 16 November 1878 Østre Aker, United Kingdoms of Sweden and Norway
- Died: 11 August 1965 (aged 86) Oslo, Norway

Gymnastics career
- Discipline: Men's artistic gymnastics
- Country represented: Norway
- Gym: Chistiania Turnforening
Medal record
Men's artistic gymnastics
Representing Norway
Olympic Games
Silver medal – second place	1908 London	Team
Intercalated Games
Gold medal – first place	1906 Athens	Team

Harald Halvorsen (16 November 1878 – 11 August 1965) was a Norwegian gymnast who competed in the 1906 Intercalated Games and in the 1908 Summer Olympics.

At the 1906 Intercalated Games in Athens, he was a member of the Norwegian gymnastics team, which won the gold medal in the team, Swedish system event. Two years later he won the silver medal as part of the Norwegian team in the gymnastics team event. He was born in Østre Aker and represented the club Kristiania TF.
