= Yngvar Fredriksen =

Norwegian artistic gymnast

- Full name: Carl Yngvar Fredriksen
- Born: 26 March 1887 Arendal, United Kingdoms of Sweden and Norway
- Died: 25 December 1957 (aged 70) Oslo, Norway

Gymnastics career
- Discipline: Men's artistic gymnastics
- Country represented: Norway
- Gym: Arendals Turnforening
Medal record
Men's artistic gymnastics
Representing Norway
Intercalated Games
Gold medal – first place	1906 Athens	Team

Carl Yngvar Fredriksen (26 March 1887 – 25 December 1957) was a Norwegian gymnast who competed in the 1906 Summer Olympics.

In 1906 he won the gold medal as member of the Norwegian gymnastics team in the team competition.
