= Harald Eriksen (gymnast) =

Norwegian artistic gymnast

- Full name: Harald Andreas Eriksen
- Born: 3 July 1881 Kristiania, United Kingdoms of Sweden and Norway
- Died: 1 June 1968 (aged 86) Trondheim, Norway

Gymnastics career
- Discipline: Men's artistic gymnastics
- Country represented: Norway
- Gym: Chistiania Turnforening
Medal record
Men's artistic gymnastics
Representing Norway
Intercalated Games
Gold medal – first place	1906 Athens	Team

Harald Andreas Eriksen (3 July 1888 – 1 June 1968) was a Norwegian gymnast who competed in the 1906 Summer Olympics.

In 1906 he won the gold medal as member of the Norwegian gymnastics team in the team competition.
