= Rasmus Petersen =

Norwegian gymnast (1877–1957)

- Full name: Rasmus Kristian Petersen
- Born: 8 September 1877 Trondheim, United Kingdoms of Sweden and Norway
- Died: 24 May 1957 (aged 79) Trondheim, Norway
- Relatives: Thorleif Petersen (brother)

Gymnastics career
- Discipline: Men's artistic gymnastics
- Country represented: Norway
- Gym: Trondhjems TF
Medal record
Men's artistic gymnastics
Representing Norway
Intercalated Games
| Gold medal – first place | 1906 Athens | Team |

Rasmus Kristen Petersen (8 September 1877 – 24 May 1957) was a Norwegian gymnast. He competed in the 1906 Summer Olympics, where he won a gold medal as part of the Norwegian gymnastics team.
