= Karl Aas =

Norwegian gymnast (1899–1943)

- Full name: Karl Jan Aas
- Born: 25 August 1899 Trondhjem, United Kingdoms of Sweden and Norway
- Died: 1 September 1943 (aged 44) Trondheim, German occupation of Norway

Gymnastics career
- Discipline: Men's artistic gymnastics
- Country represented: Norway
- Gym: Trondhjems Turnforening
Medal record
Men's artistic gymnastics
Representing Norway
Olympic Games
Silver medal – second place	1920 Antwerp	Team, free system

Karl Jan Aas (25 August 1899 – 1 September 1943) was a Norwegian gymnast who competed in the 1920 Summer Olympics.

He was part of the Norwegian men's gymnastics team which won the silver medal in the gymnastics free system event. He represented the club Trondhjems TF.
