= Oswald Falch =

Norwegian artistic gymnast

- Full name: Oswald Anathon Thygesen Falch
- Born: 21 July 1884 Steinkjer, Norway
- Died: 13 February 1977 (aged 92) Steinkjer, Norway

Gymnastics career
- Discipline: Men's artistic gymnastics
- Country represented: Norway
- Club: Stenkjer Gymnastics Association
Medal record
Men's gymnastics
Representing Norway
Intercalated Games
Gold medal – first place	1906 Athens	Team

Oswald Anathon Thygesen Falch (21 July 1884 – 13 February 1977) was a Norwegian gymnast who competed in the 1906 Summer Olympics. He won the gold medal in the team competition.

His great granddaughter, Mira Verås Larsen, competed at the 2012 Summer Olympics and was Norway's flag bearer in the opening ceremony.
