= Frithjof Olsen =

Norwegian gymnast (1882–1922)

- Born: 30 November 1883 Drammen, United Kingdoms of Sweden and Norway
- Died: 22 February 1922 (aged 38) Kristiania, Norway

Gymnastics career
- Discipline: Men's artistic gymnastics
- Country represented: Norway
- Gym: Drammens TF
Medal record
Men's artistic gymnastics
Representing Norway
Olympic Games
Silver medal – second place	1908 London	Team
Bronze medal – third place	1912 Stockholm	Team, Swedish system
Intercalated Games
Gold medal – first place	1906 Athens	Team

Frithjof Olsen (30 November 1882 – 22 February 1922) was a Norwegian gymnast who competed in the 1906 Intercalated Games, the 1908 Summer Olympics, and the 1912 Summer Olympics.

At the 1906 Intercalated Games in Athens, he was a member of the Norwegian team, which won the gold medal in the gymnastics team event.

In 1908, he won a silver medal in the gymnastics team event with the Norwegian team. He also competed in the all-around event, but his result is unknown.

Four years later, he was part of the Norwegian gymnastics team, which won the bronze medal in the gymnastics men's team Swedish system event.

He represented Drammens TF.
