= Thorleiv Røhn =

Norwegian Army officer (1881–1963)

Thorleiv Bugge Røhn
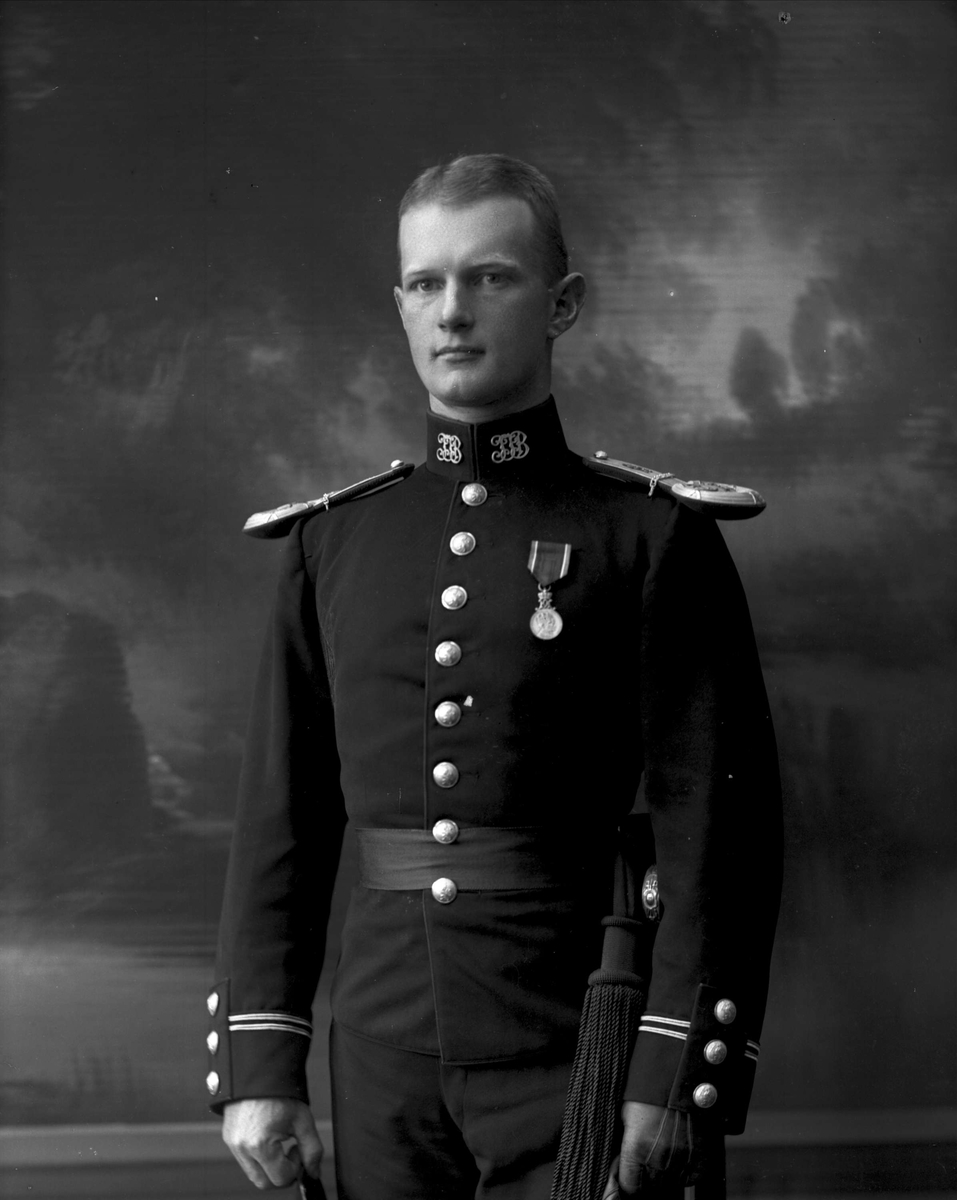
- Thorleiv Bugge Røhn in 1907; Photographer: Gustav Borgen
- Born: 23 July 1881; Kristiania, United Kingdoms of Sweden and Norway
- Died: 20 September 1963 (aged 82); Meldal, Norway
- Military career
- Allegiance: Norway; Belgium: Belgian Congo
- Branch: Norwegian Army; Force Publique
- Service years: Norwegian Army: 1903–1940; Force Publique: 1909–1915
- Rank: Major (Norwegian Army); Commandant (Force Publique)
- Awards: Haakon VII Coronation Medal; Knight of the Royal Order of the Lion; Belgian Congo Silver Service Star; Knight, 2nd class of the Order of Saint Stanislaus

Gymnastics career
- Discipline: Men's artistic gymnastics
- Country represented: Norway
- Club: Chistiania Turnforening
Medal record
Men's artistic gymnastics
Representing Norway
Intercalated Games
Gold medal – first place	1906 Athens	Team

Thorleiv Bugge Røhn (23 July 1881 – 20 September 1963) was a Norwegian Army officer, who as a gymnast was a member of the team that won the gold medal in the team competition at the 1906 Intercalated Games in Athens, Greece.

Facing limited military career prospects in Norway, Røhn sought better fortunes abroad. Having been involved in a failed business venture in Cuba in 1907–1908, he joined the Belgian colonial army Force Publique in 1909. He served in the Belgian Congo until being ordered back into active Norwegian Army service in 1915. Having been a member of the Norwegian fascist party Nasjonal Samling, Røhn was convicted of treason in the Norwegian post-Second World War legal purge.

== Personal life ==
He was born in Kristiania, United Kingdoms of Sweden and Norway. His parents were Ole Thorstensen Røhn and Maren Elise Bugge, who were both teachers. In the years 1898 to 1900 he attended Aars og Voss' School, gaining his examen artium academic certification. His father died in 1899 and his mother in 1944. Two of his sisters were killed in a British bombing raid on Oslo in 1944. After retiring, Røhn moved to the village of Meldal, where he died in 1963. He never married.

== Military career ==
=== Norway, 1903–09 ===
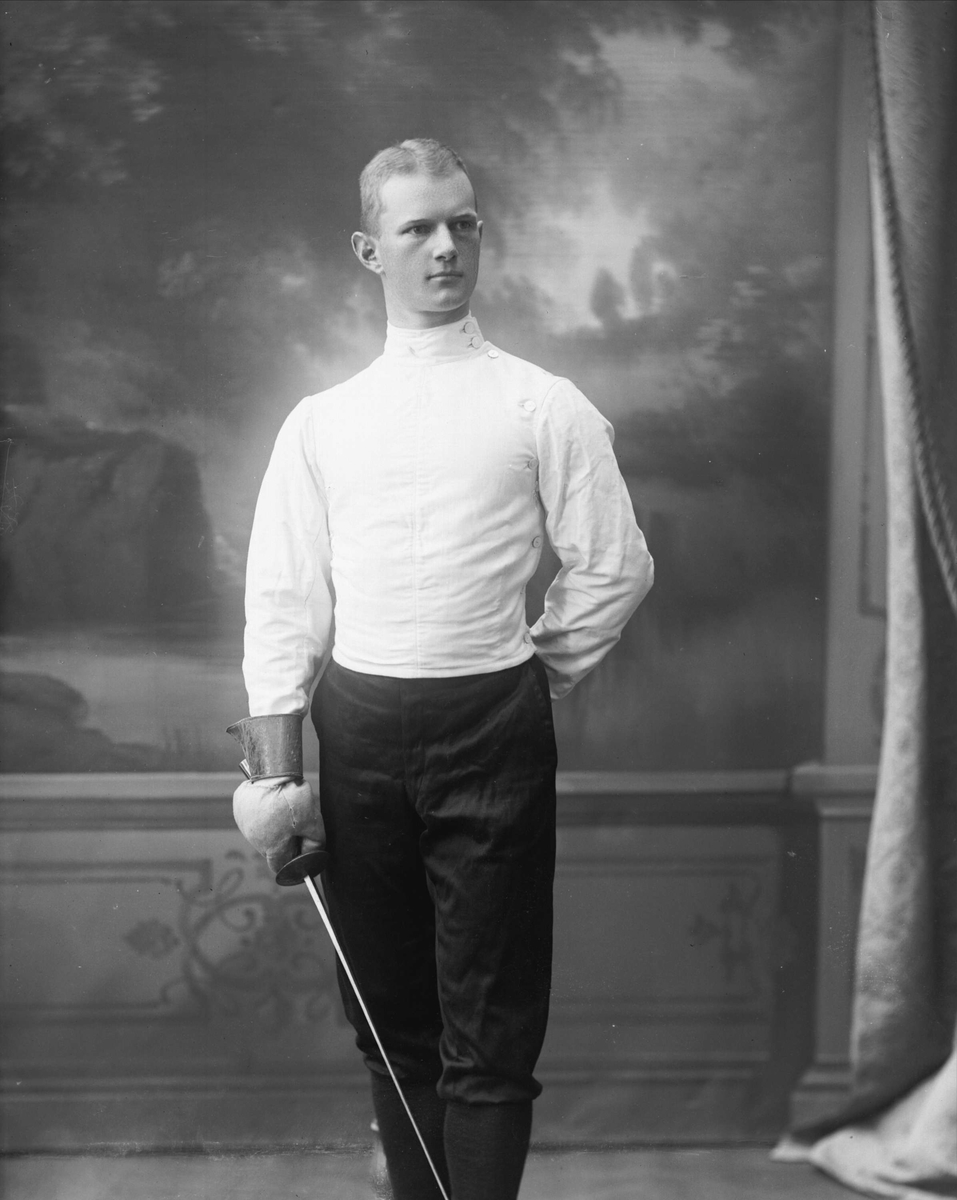
Thorleiv Bugge Røhn in a fencing uniform in 1907

In 1903 he graduated from the upper section of the Norwegian Military Academy. The same year he became a first lieutenant in the Kristiansandske Brigade. In the years 1905 to 1907 he attended the Norwegian Military College, but left the school three months before graduation, citing personal reasons. In his spare time, he held lectures on the subjects of defence, sports and shooting.

=== Belgian Congo, 1909–15 ===
In 1909 he entered the service of the Belgian colonial army Force Publique, living in Belgium and in the Belgian Congo. Initially serving as a first lieutenant, he advanced to the rank of Commandant before he was ordered by the Norwegian authorities to leave Belgian service in 1915. No longer supernumerary, due to the Norwegian Army needing more officers during the First World War, Røhn was instructed to resume his regular duties with the 5th Brigade from 1 July 1915. Røhn was one of 200-300 Norwegians who joined the Force Publique through its history, and one of 21 Norwegians to attain the rank of Commandant in the Belgian colonial army.

=== Norway, 1915–40 ===
He transferred to the Trondhjemske Brigade in 1915, and was promoted to the rank of captain on 11 August 1916. Between 1916 and 1930, he was the commander of the 5th Heavy Machine Gun Company. From 1925 to 1930 he was also the commander of the garrison company in Trondheim. In 1930 he took command of 12th Company of the 12th Infantry Regiment, the same year transferring to the reserves. In 1930 he twice applied unsuccessfully for a promotion to the rank of major, and the command of a regular army battalion. As a captain in the reserve forces, he applied unsuccessfully for the rank of lieutenant colonel, and the command of the landvern battalion of the 12th Infantry Regiment, in 1933. In 1936 he was promoted to the rank of major, He never advanced further in military rank, even though he applied twice more for a promotion to the rank of lieutenant colonel. His penultimate attempt at promotion to lieutenant colonel occurred in 1938, when he applied for a promotion and the command of the landvern battalion of the 13th Infantry Regiment. The final application he handed in was rejected by the Norwegian authorities in 1939, when he applied for a promotion to lieutenant colonel and the command of either the 11th or the 12th Infantry Regiments' landvern battalion.

== Sports career ==
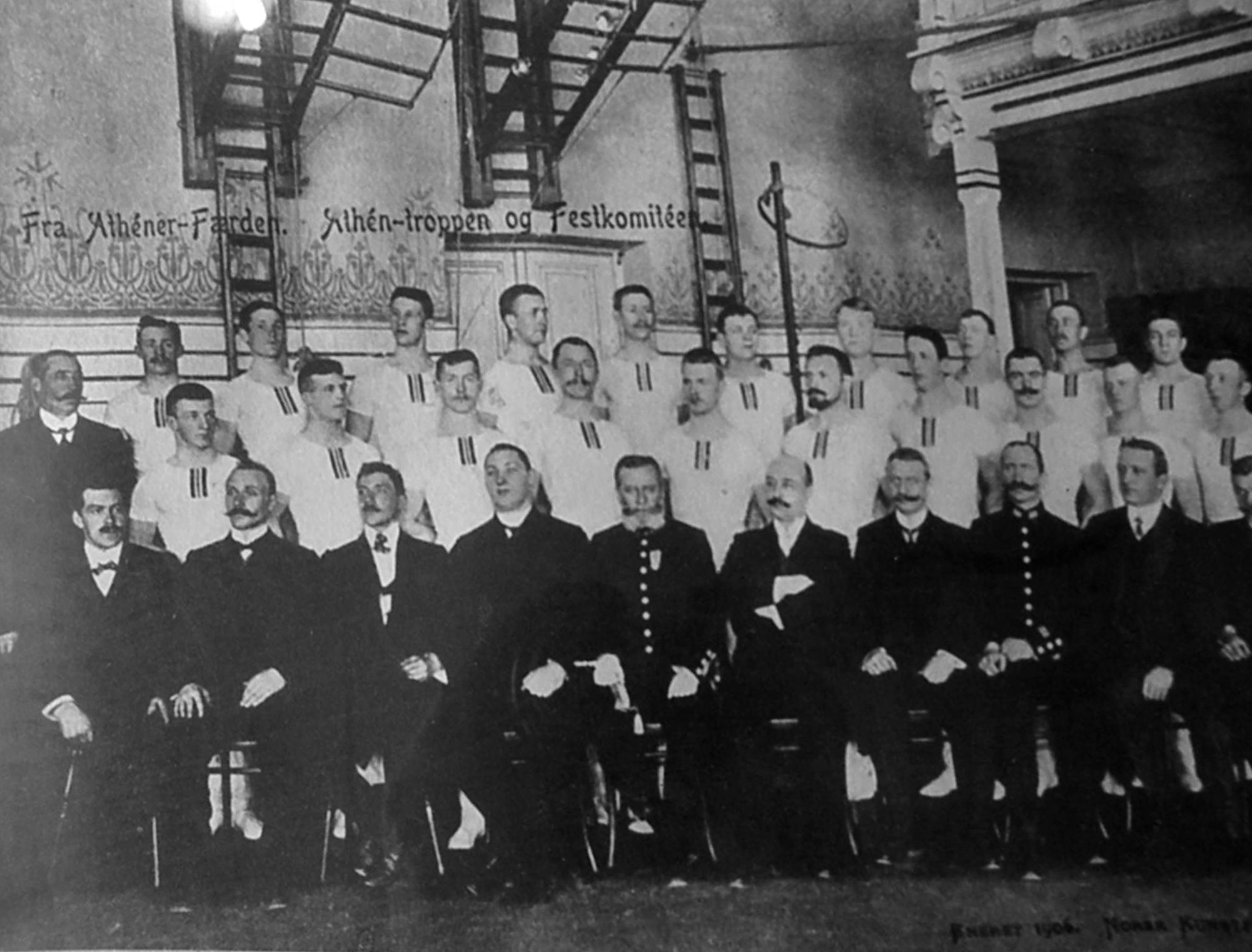
The Norwegian 1906 gymnastics team. Røhn is the second from the right, mid row.

In 1906, Røhn was a member of the 20-strong Norwegian team that won the gold medal in the team event in gymnastics at the 1906 Intercalated Games in Athens, Greece. The team won the first ever gold medal for Norway in an Olympic competition, having trained together for one month before travelling to Greece. The press at the time praised the Norwegian team as "the world's first gymnasts" and described them as "flying marble statues". No individual prizes were awarded at the games. A single gold medal, a silver cup and branches of a wild-olive tree were sent to the Norwegian Gymnastics and Sports Association, and initially stored at the Bergens kunsindustrimuseum in Bergen. The silver cup, a gift from King George I of Greece, was, after arrival in Norway, inscribed at the base with the names of the gymnasts from the 1906 team. At a national level, he represented the Oslo-based club Oslo Turnforening.

In the shooting sport, he represented Gauldal skyttarsamlag, an association of rifle clubs in the Gauldal region, in the pre-Second World War years.

== Cuban business venture ==
In 1907 Røhn was granted leave from his military service. On 7 September 1907, he travelled from Kristiania to Cuba. He had invested in a stake in the 4.32 square kilometres (1.67 sq mi) "La Liza" plantation, near the city of Baracoa, which had been previously purchased by other Norwegians. The intention of the business venture was to grow crops of tobacco, cocoa, bananas, and coconuts. In addition to the crops, the Norwegians planned to cut timber and raise swine for sale at the local markets. The enterprise failed to make a profit, and Røhn returned to Norway in late 1908.

== Second World War ==
Røhn was a member of the Norwegian fascist party Nasjonal Samling. (Note: Nasjonal Samling, led by Vidkun Quisling, actively collaborated with the Germans throughout their 1940–1945 occupation of Norway. After the end of the Second World War, the members of the party were charged with treason.) In the legal purge after the end of the Second World War, Røhn was convicted of treason against Norway and sentenced to four years in prison with forced labour. Because of his treason conviction, Røhn was banned from membership in the Norwegian Congo Veterans' Association (Norwegian: Norske kongoveteraners forening, French: Section de Norvège des Vétérans Coloniaux), and also lost the right to a pension from the Belgian state.

== Honours and awards ==
Røhn was awarded the Haakon VII Coronation Medal in silver, for having participated in the coronation of Haakon VII of Norway in Trondheim in 1906.

For his services in the Congo, the Belgian authorities made Røhn a Knight of the Royal Order of the Lion, as well as awarding him the Belgian Congo Silver Service Star. He was also a Knight, 2nd class of the Russian Order of Saint Stanislaus.
