= Karl Haagensen =

Norwegian artistic gymnast

- Full name: Karl Johan Haagensen
- Born: 26 March 1871 Kristiania, United Kingdoms of Sweden and Norway
- Died: 25 August 1918 (aged 47) Kristiania, Norway

Gymnastics career
- Discipline: Men's artistic gymnastics
- Country represented: Norway
- Gym: Chistiania Turnforening
Medal record
Men's artistic gymnastics
Representing Norway
Intercalated Games
Gold medal – first place	1906 Athens	Team

Karl Johan Haagensen (26 March 1871, in Oslo – 25 August 1918) was a Norwegian gymnast who competed in the 1906 Summer Olympics.

In 1906 he won the gold medal as member of the Norwegian gymnastics team in the team competition at the age of 35.
