= Drammens TF =

Norwegian gymnastics club

Logo.

Drammens Turnforening, often called Drammen Turn is a Norwegian gymnastics club from Drammen.

The club was founded on 4 October 1857, and is therefore Norway's third oldest sports club after Oslo TF (founded 1855) and Arendal TF (founded 17 May 1857).

Gymnast Flemming Solberg represented the club, so did the much older Aksel Hansen (Olympic bronze), Frithjof Olsen (Olympic gold, silver, bronze), Arne Knudsen and Odd Lie.

It formerly had a section for track and field. Olympic high jumper Otto Monsen took the national titles in 1916 and 1917. Ferdinand Bie also represented the club.
