= Niels Petersen (gymnast) =

Danish gymnast (1885–1961)

- Full name: Niels Knudsen Petersen
- Born: 12 July 1885 Copenhagen, Denmark
- Died: 29 August 1961 (aged 76) Søllerød, Denmark

Gymnastics career
- Discipline: Men's artistic gymnastics
- Country represented: Denmark
Medal record
Men's artistic gymnastics
Representing Denmark
Olympic Games
Bronze medal – third place	1912 Stockholm	Team, free system
Intercalated Games
Silver medal – second place	1906 Athens	Team

Niels Knudsen Petersen (12 July 1885 – 29 April 1961) was a Danish gymnast who competed in the 1906 Intercalated Games, the 1908 Summer Olympics, and the 1912 Summer Olympics.

At the 1906 Intercalated Games in Athens, he was a member of the Danish gymnastics team, which won the silver medal. He was part of the Danish team, which finished fourth in the gymnastics team event in 1908.

Four years later, he won the bronze medal in the gymnastics men's team, free system event. In the individual all-around competition, he finished 34th.
