= Carl Andersen (gymnast) =

Danish gymnast and architect

- Born: 9 March 1879 Odense, Denmark
- Died: 12 September 1967 (aged 88) Nykøbing Falster, Denmark
- Relatives: Karen Margrete Andersen (daughter)

Gymnastics career
- Discipline: Men's artistic gymnastics
- Country represented: Denmark
Medal record
Men's artistic gymnastics
Representing Denmark
Intercalated Games
| Silver medal – second place | 1906 Athens | Team |

Carl Andersen (9 March 1879 in Odense – 12 September 1967 in Nykøbing Falster) was a Danish gymnast and architect.

== Early life and education ==
Carl Andersen was the son of carpenter Andreas Ferdinand Andersen and Ane Marie Hansen. He became a mason apprentice in 1896 and graduated from Odense Tekniske Skole in 1900. He was employed as a construction overseer by master builder Thaaning in Kerteminde in 1900-01 and as a draftsman for architect Emanuel Momberg in Odense in 1901–02. In 1904-06, he was employed by several different architects in Copenhagen, including Anders Berthelsen, and in 1906-09 as drawer and overseer by H.C. Glahn, Nykøbing Falster in 1906–1909.

== Gymnastics career ==
Andersen competed in the 1906 Intercalated Games and in the 1908 Summer Olympics. During the 1906 Games in Athens, he was a member of the Danish gymnastics team, which won the silver medal in the team, Swedish system event. Two years later, he was part of the Danish team, which finished fourth in the team competition.

== Post-gymnastics career ==
From 1909 until his death, Carl Andersen operated his own architectural business in Nykøbing Falster; from 1940, with his son Jørgen Friis Andersen. The business later became Arkitektfirmaet Friis Andersen A/S, which still operated in the 2010s. Carl Andersen worked extensively on Lolland in the early 1900s and had many different assignments. Stylistically he worked mainly with neo-baroque but later adopted elements from Functionalism.

=== Selected works ===
- Nykøbing Falster Post House and post masters house, Jernbanegade 50, Nykøbing Falster
- Remodeling of Nykøbing Falster School (1912)
- Public butchery, Markedsgade, Nykøbing Falster (1912)
- Gedser Church (1914–15, with Peder Vilhelm Jensen-Klint)
- Nykøbing Falster Hospital, Bispegade (1915)
- Sakskøbing police station
