= Marius Thuesen =

Danish gymnast (1878–1941)

- Full name: Marius Laurits Theodor Jensen Thuesen
- Born: 23 January 1878 Holbæk, Denmark
- Died: 12 July 1941 (aged 63) Copenhagen, Denmark

Gymnastics career
- Discipline: Men's artistic gymnastics
- Country represented: Denmark
Medal record
Men's artistic gymnastics
Representing Denmark
Intercalated Games
Silver medal – second place	1906 Athens	Team

Marius Laurits Theodor Jensen Thuesen (23 January 1878 in Holbæk, Denmark – 12 July 1941 in Copenhagen, Denmark) was a Danish gymnast who competed in the 1906 Summer Olympics and in the 1908 Summer Olympics.

At the 1906 Summer Olympics in Athens, he was a member of the Danish gymnastics team that won the silver medal in the team, Swedish system event. Two years later, he was part of the Danish team that finished fourth in the team competition.
