= Carl Manicus-Hansen =

Danish gymnast (1877–1960)

- Full name: Carl Hans Theodor Manicus-Hansen
- Born: 2 December 1877 Copenhagen, Denmark
- Died: 23 September 1960 (aged 82) Copenhagen, Danmark

Gymnastics career
- Discipline: Men's artistic gymnastics
- Country represented: Denmark
Medal record
Men's artistic gymnastics
Representing Denmark
Intercalated Games
Silver medal – second place	1906 Athens	Team

Carl Hans Theodor Manicus-Hansen (2 December 1877 in Copenhagen, Denmark – 23 September 1960 in Copenhagen, Denmark) was a Danish gymnast who competed in the 1906 Summer Olympics.

In 1906, he won the silver medal as a member of the Danish gymnastics team in the team competition.

At club level, he represented Akademisk Gymnastikforening.

Professionally, he was an engineer.
