= Harald Bukdahl =

Danish gymnast

- Full name: Peder Harald Pedersen Bukdahl
- Born: 28 January 1884 Ødis, Denmark
- Died: 12 December 1951 (aged 67) Kastrup, Denmark

Gymnastics career
- Discipline: Men's artistic gymnastics
- Country represented: Denmark
Medal record
Men's artistic gymnastics
Representing Denmark
Intercalated Games
| Silver medal – second place | 1906 Athens | Team |

Peder Harald Pedersen Bukdahl (28 January 1884 in Ødis, Denmark – 12 December 1951 in Kastrup, Denmark) was a Danish gymnast who competed in the 1906 Summer Olympics. He was educated as a civil engineer.

In 1906 he won the silver medal as member of the Danish gymnastics team in the team competition.
