= Harald Klem =

Danish gymnast and swimmer

- Full name: Harald Robert Severin Klem
- Born: 21 June 1884 Tikøb, Denmark
- Died: 24 July 1954 (aged 70) Copenhagen, Denmark

Gymnastics career
- Discipline: Men's artistic gymnastics
- Country represented: Denmark
Medal record
Men's artistic gymnastics
Representing Denmark
Intercalated Games
Silver medal – second place	1906 Athens	Team

Harald Robert Severin Klem (21 June 1884 in Tikøb, Denmark – 24 July 1954 in Copenhagen, Denmark) was a Danish gymnast and swimmer who competed in the 1906 Intercalated Games and in the 1908 Summer Olympics.

At the 1906 Intercalated Games in Athens, he was a member of the Danish gymnastics team, which won the silver medal in the team, Swedish system event.

Two years later, he was part of the Danish team, which finished fourth in the team competition. His brother Erik Klem was a part of the same team. Harald Klem also finished fifth in his heat of 100 metre freestyle, third in his heat of 200 metre breaststroke and with a Danish 4x200 metre freestyle relay team second in his heat and did not advance in all occasions.
