= Robert Madsen =

Danish gymnast

- Full name: Robert Christian Klein Madsen
- Born: 13 December 1882 Odense, Denmark
- Died: 24 September 1954 (aged 71) Copenhagen, Denmark

Gymnastics career
- Discipline: Men's artistic gymnastics
- Country represented: Denmark
Medal record
Men's artistic gymnastics
Representing Denmark
Intercalated Games
Silver medal – second place	1906 Athens	Team

Robert Christian Klein Madsen (13 December 1882 in Odense, Denmark – 24 September 1954 in Copenhagen, Denmark) was a Danish gymnast who competed in the 1906 Intercalated Games and the 1908 Summer Olympics. He represented the club Handelsstandens Gymnastikforening. He won three Danish Championships in pole vaulting, in 1902, 1903 and 1907. At the 1903 Championships he achieved an at-the-time Danish record of 3.13 meters.

At the 1906 Intercalated Games in Athens, he was a member of the Danish gymnastics team, which won the silver medal in the team, Swedish system event. Two years later he was part of the Danish team, which finished fourth in the team competition.
