= Kaj Gnudtzmann =

Danish gymnast

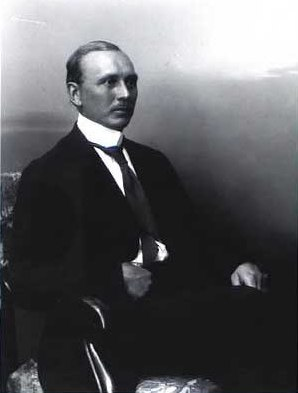
- Gnudtzmann c. 1916

Personal information
- Full name: Kaj Svane Gnudtzmann
- Born: 1 May 1880 Copenhagen, Denmark
- Died: 22 September 1948 (aged 68) Copenhagen, Denmark
- Spouse: Thyra Boldsen (m. 1906; dissolved 1915)

Gymnastics career
- Discipline: Men's artistic gymnastics
- Country represented: Denmark
Medal record
Men's artistic gymnastics
Representing Denmark
Intercalated Games
| Silver medal – second place | 1906 Athens | Team |

Kaj Svane Gnudtzmann (1 May 1880 – 22 September 1948) was a Danish gymnast who competed in the 1906 Intercalated Games.

In 1906, he won the silver medal as a member of the Danish gymnastics team in the team competition.

Professionally, he was a civil engineer. He was married to the sculptor Thyra Boldsen on 9 June 1906, but the marriage was dissolved in 1915.
