= Knud Holm =

Danish gymnast

- Full name: Knud Olaf Holm
- Born: 2 January 1887 Copenhagen, Denmark
- Died: 28 May 1972 (aged 85) Copenhagen, Denmark

Gymnastics career
- Discipline: Men's artistic gymnastics
- Country represented: Denmark
Medal record
Men's artistic gymnastics
Representing Denmark
Intercalated Games
Silver medal – second place	1906 Athens	Team

Knud Olaf Holm (2 January 1887 – 28 May 1972) was a Danish gymnast who competed in the 1906 Summer Olympics and in the 1908 Summer Olympics.

At the 1906 Summer Olympics in Athens, he was a member of the Danish gymnastics team, which won the silver medal in the team, Swedish system event. Two years later, he was part of the Danish team, which finished fourth in the team competition.

He was the brother of fellow Olympic participant Poul Holm and Aage Holm.
