= Viktor Rasmussen =

Danish gymnast

- Full name: Viktor Kristoffer Rasmussen
- Born: 10 January 1882 Copenhagen, Denmark
- Died: 1 May 1956 (aged 74) Copenhagen, Denmark

Gymnastics career
- Discipline: Men's artistic gymnastics
- Country represented: Denmark
Medal record
Men's artistic gymnastics
Representing Denmark
Intercalated Games
Silver medal – second place	1906 Athens	Team

Viktor Kristoffer Rasmussen (10 January 1882 – 1 May 1956) was a Danish gymnast who competed in the 1906 Summer Olympics and in the 1908 Summer Olympics.

At the 1906 Summer Olympics in Athens, he was a member of the Danish gymnastics team, which won the silver medal in the team, Swedish system event. Two years later, he was part of the Danish team, which finished fourth in the team competition.
