= Halvor Birch =

Danish gymnast (1885–1962)

- Born: 21 February 1885 Horsens, Denmark
- Died: 5 July 1962 (aged 77) Copenhagen, Denmark

Gymnastics career
- Discipline: Men's artistic gymnastics
- Country represented: Denmark
Medal record
Men's artistic gymnastics
Representing Denmark
Olympic Games
Bronze medal – third place	1912 Stockholm	Team, free system
Intercalated Games
Silver medal – second place	1906 Athens	Team

Halvor Birch (21 February 1885 – 5 July 1962) was a Danish gymnast who competed in the 1906 Summer Olympics and in the 1912 Summer Olympics.

At the 1906 Summer Olympics in Athens, he was a member of the Danish gymnastics team, which won the silver medal. Six years later, he won the bronze medal in the gymnastics men's team, free system event.

At club level he was a member of Handelsstandens Gymnastikforening (HG). He won the Danish championship in team gymnastics four times.

He was also an active cricket player and worked as a salesman.
