= Otto Bock (athlete) =

German-born Danish athlete

Personal information
- Full name: Otto Erich Friedrich Hugo Bock
- Nationality: Danish
- Born: 22 September 1881 Braunschweig, German Empire

Sport
- Sport: Athletics
- Club: Odense GF

Otto Bock (born 22 September 1881, date of death unknown) was a German-born Danish athlete.

Bock competed for Denmark at the 1906 Intercalated Games, taking part in the men's 100 metres, long jump and high jump events.
