= Rudolf Watzl =

Austrian wrestler

Personal information
- Born: 14 April 1882 Vienna, Austria-Hungary
- Died: 15 August 1915 (aged 33) Przemyśl, Austria-Hungary

Sport
- Country: Austria
- Sport: Wrestling
Medal record
Men's Greco-Roman wrestling
Representing Austria
Intercalated Games
Gold medal – first place	1906 Athens	Greco-Roman Lightweight
Bronze medal – third place	1906 Athens	Greco-Roman All-round

Rudolf Watzl (14 April 1882 – 15 August 1915) was an Austrian Greco-Roman wrestler who competed in the 1906 Intercalated Games in Athens, Greece and won a gold and a bronze medal.

Watzl was actually 24 years old when he started wrestling in 1904 at the First Vienna Sports Club, and just two years later he was representing his country at the 1906 Intercalated Games in Athens. Watzl went on to compete in two events, the first was the Greco-Roman Lightweight class, and in the first round he beat the Greek wrestler Dimitrios Kolyvas, in the semi-finals he went on to beat Renè Dobrinovitz from Belgium. The final was a three way round robin event, first Watzl beat Ferenc Holubán from Hungary, then in a forty-minute contest he overcame the Danish wrestler Carl Carlsen to win the gold medal. Watzl also competed in the All-Round contest an event which all three weight winners contested, Watzl lost in the first round to Søren Marinus Jensen from Denmark, so won the bronze medal.

During World War One, Watzl joined the Austro-Hungarian Army, but during one of the counter offensives of the fortress of Przemyśl, in Poland, he was taken ill and on 15 August 1915 he died from typhoid.
