= Finland at the 1906 Intercalated Games =

Finland at the Olympics

- The Grand Duchy of Finland had no official flag; the Russian flag was used for both countries in the Olympics.
- IOC code: FIN
- NOC: Finnish Olympic Committee

in Athens
- Competitors: 4 in 2 sports
- Medals Ranked 13th: Gold 2 Silver 1 Bronze 1 Total 4

Summer appearances
- 1908; 1912; 1920; 1924; 1928; 1932; 1936; 1948; 1952; 1956; 1960; 1964; 1968; 1972; 1976; 1980; 1984; 1988; 1992; 1996; 2000; 2004; 2008; 2012; 2016; 2020; 2024

Winter appearances
- 1924; 1928; 1932; 1936; 1948; 1952; 1956; 1960; 1964; 1968; 1972; 1976; 1980; 1984; 1988; 1992; 1994; 1998; 2002; 2006; 2010; 2014; 2018; 2022; 2026

Finland competed at the 1906 Intercalated Games in Athens, Greece. Four athletes, all men, competed in eleven events in two sports.

== Athletics ==
Track

Athlete	Events	Heat		Semifinals		Final	
Athlete	Events	Result	Rank	Result	Rank	Result	Rank
Uno Häggman	100 metres	Unknown	4	did not advance			

Field

Athlete	Events	Final	
Athlete	Events	Result	Rank
Heikki Åhlman	Pole vault	3.000	5
Uno Häggman	Standing long jump	2.425	28
Verner Järvinen	Shot put	Unknown	Unknown
Heikki Åhlman	Shot put	Unknown	Unknown
Verner Järvinen	Stone throw	Unknown	Unknown
Heikki Åhlman	Stone throw	Unknown	Unknown
Verner Järvinen	Discus	36.82	3rd place, bronze medalist(s)
Heikki Åhlman	Discus	Unknown	Unknown
Uno Häggman	Discus	Unknown	Unknown
Verner Järvinen	Discus Greek style	35.170	1st place, gold medalist(s)
Verner Järvinen	Javelin	44.25	5
Heikki Åhlman	Javelin	44.00	6
Uno Häggman	Javelin	43.25	9
Uno Häggman	Pentathlon (Ancient)	34 points	4
Heikki Åhlman	Pentathlon (Ancient)	47 points	17

== Wrestling ==
Greco-Roman

Athlete	Event	Round 1	Quarterfinals	Semifinals	Final Group		
Athlete	Event	Opposition Result	Opposition Result	Opposition Result	Opposition Result	Opposition Result	Rank
Verner Weckman	Middleweight	Boghaert (FRA); W	Sauveur (BEL); W	Lindmayer (AUT); W	n/a	Behrens (DEN); W	1st place, gold medalist(s)
Verner Weckman	All-Round	n/a			bye	Jensen (DEN); L	2nd place, silver medalist(s)
