= Marius Skram-Jensen =

Danish artistic gymnast (1881–1975)

- Full name: Marius Halvor Skram-Jensen
- Born: 1 March 1881 Slagelse, Denmark
- Died: 17 January 1975 (aged 93) Harriman, Tennessee, US

Gymnastics career
- Discipline: Men's artistic gymnastics
- Country represented: Denmark
- Club: Københavns Gymnastikforening
Medal record
Men's artistic gymnastics
Representing Denmark
Intercalated Games
Silver medal – second place	1906 Athens	Team

Marius Halvor Skram-Jensen aka John Jensen (1 March 1881 in Slagelse, Denmark – 17 January 1975 in Harriman, Tennessee) was a Danish gymnast who competed in the 1906 Summer Olympics.

In 1906, he won the silver medal as a member of the Danish gymnastics team in the team competition.

In 1910, he emigrated to the United States and changed his name to John Jensen.
