= Erik Klem =

Danish gymnast

- Full name: Erik Walter Klem
- Born: 25 July 1886 Tikøb, Denmark
- Died: 28 April 1965 (aged 78) Copenhagen, Denmark

Gymnastics career
- Discipline: Men's artistic gymnastics
- Country represented: Denmark
Medal record
Men's artistic gymnastics
Representing Denmark
Intercalated Games
Silver medal – second place	1906 Athens	Team

Erik Walter Klem (25 July 1886 in Tikøb, Denmark – 24 January 1965 in Copenhagen, Denmark) was a Danish gymnast who competed in the 1906 Summer Olympics.

In 1906 he won the silver medal as member of the Danish gymnastics team in the team competition. His brother Harald Klem was a part of the same team.
