= Louis Larsen =

Danish gymnast 1874-1950

- Full name: Louis Edmund Larsen
- Born: 10 January 1874 Copenhagen, Denmark
- Died: 26 May 1950 (aged 76) Hellerup, Denmark

Gymnastics career
- Discipline: Men's artistic gymnastics
- Country represented: Denmark
Medal record
Men's artistic gymnastics
Representing Denmark
Intercalated Games
Silver medal – second place	1906 Athens	Team

Louis Edmund Larsen (10 January 1874 – 26 May 1950) was a Danish gymnast who competed in the 1906 Intercalated Games.

In 1906 he won the silver medal as member of the Danish gymnastics team in the team competition.
