= Georgios Aliprantis =

Greek gymnast

- Γεώργιος Αλιπραντης
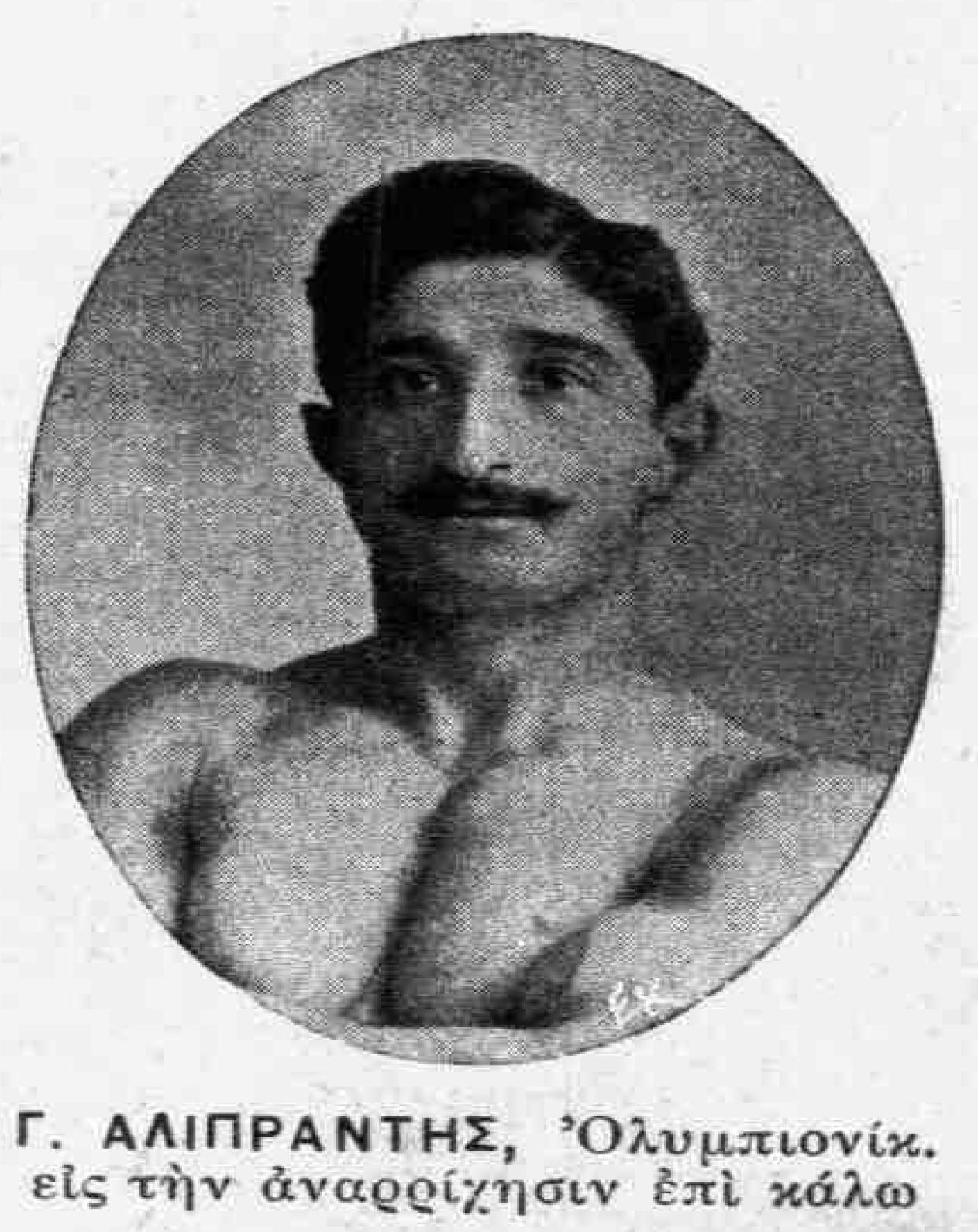
- Aliprantis in 1908

Personal information
- Born: 1880 Constantinople, Ottoman Empire
- Died: 31 July 1943 (aged 62–63) Athens, Greece

Gymnastics career
- Discipline: Men's artistic gymnastics
- Country represented: Greece
Medal record
Men's artistic gymnastics
Representing Greece
Intercalated Games
Gold medal – first place	1906 Athens	Rope climbing

Georgios Aliprantis (Greek: Γεώργιος Αλιμπράντης, 1880 – 31 July 1943) was a Greek gymnast who won the rope climbing event at the 1906 Intercalated Games in Athens, Greece.

== Early life ==
Georgios Aliprantis was born in Istanbul, Ottoman Empire. His brother Nikolaos was also a gymnast who also competed at the 1906 Intercalated Games.

== Gymnastics career ==
Aliprantis won the rope climbing event at the 1906 Intercalated Games in Athens, Greece. The event consisted of climbing up a 10 metres (33 ft) rope in the fastest time, and Aliprantis' time of 11.4 seconds was 2.4 seconds quicker than Hungary's Béla Erödy, who finished second. At the Games, Aliprantis also competed in the Individual all-around, 5 events competition, finishing fifth. The event was won by France's Pierre Payssé. In addition to his gold medal, Georgios was awarded a Hermes statue, and a second Hermes statue was awarded to his brother Nikolaos Aliprantis.
