= Carl Pedersen (footballer) =

Norwegian footballer (1891-1964)

Personal information
- Date of birth: 27 March 1891
- Place of birth: Porsgrunn, Norway
- Date of death: 14 May 1964 (aged 73)
- Place of death: Porsgrunn, Norway

International career
Years	Team	Apps	(Gls)
- Norway

Carl Pedersen (27 March 1891 – 14 May 1964) was a Norwegian footballer. He played in two matches for the Norway national football team in 1913.
