= Kristian Pedersen (gymnast) =

Danish artistic gymnast

- Full name: Oluf Kristian Edvin Pedersen
- Born: 14 March 1878 Copenhagen, Denmark
- Died: 8 March 1917 (aged 38) Copenhagen, Denmark

Gymnastics career
- Discipline: Men's artistic gymnastics
- Country represented: Denmark
Medal record
Men's artistic gymnastics
Representing Denmark
Olympic Games
Bronze medal – third place	1912 Stockholm	Team, free system
Intercalated Games
Silver medal – second place	1906 Athens	Team

Oluf Kristian Edvin Pedersen (14 March 1878 – 8 March 1917) was a Danish gymnast who competed in the 1906 Intercalated Games and in the 1912 Summer Olympics.

At the 1906 Games in Athens, he was a member of the Danish gymnastics team, which won the silver medal. Six years later he won the bronze medal in the gymnastics men's team, free system event.
