= Aspioti-ELKA =

Greek printing house

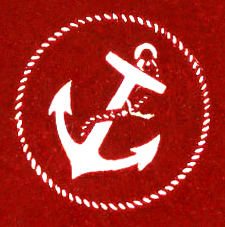
- Headquarters: Corfu, Greece
- Products: Playing cards, postcards, stamps, shares, bonds

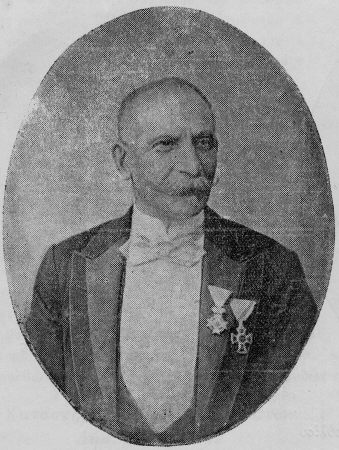
Gerasimos Aspiotis (1843–1901)

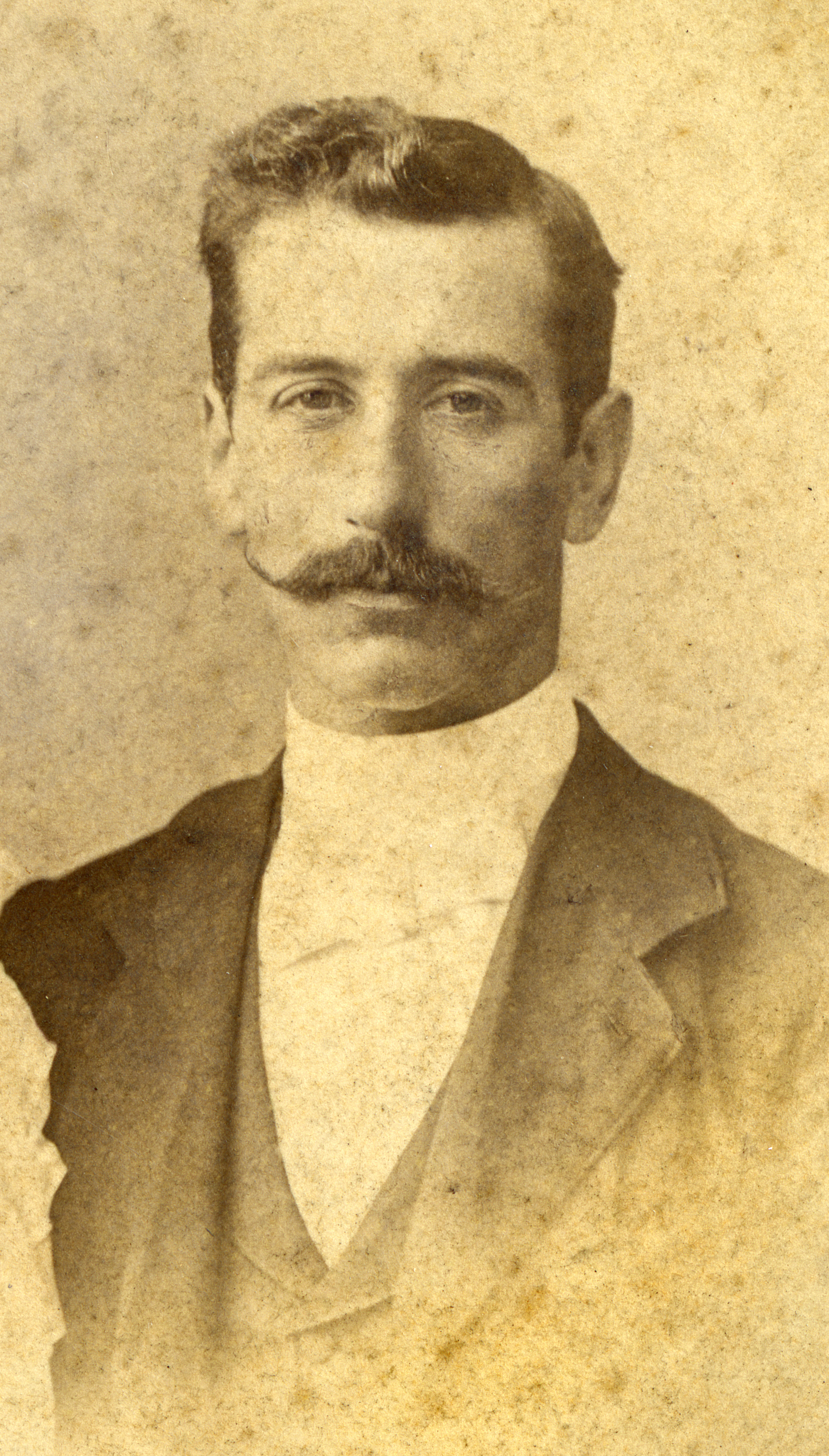
Konstantinos Aspiotis (1872–1963). Photograph by B. Borri, 1895 c.

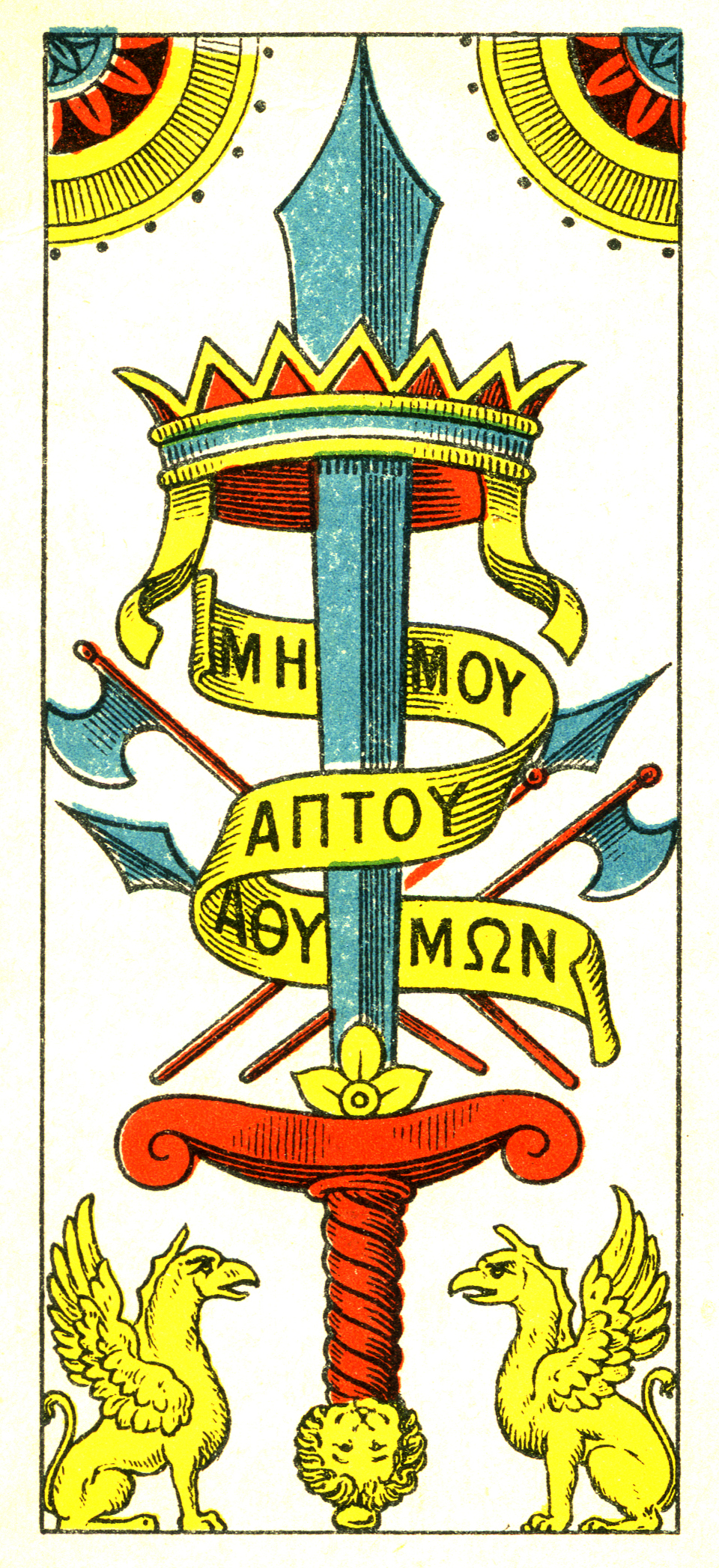
Venetian type playing card printed at the Elpis factory of Gerasimos Aspiotis, in Corfu.

Aspioti-ELKA (Greek: Ασπιώτη-ΕΛΚΑ) was one of the largest publishing and printing enterprises of Greece. Founded in 1873 in Corfu by Gerasimos Aspiotis as a factory manufacturing playing cards under the name Elpis it eventually merged with the Etairia Lithographias kai Kytiopoieias Athenon (ELKA) and finally became Aspioti-ELKA.

In business for over a century, Aspioti-ELKA was the oldest company of its kind in Greece when it folded in 1997. During the post-WWII period Aspioti-ELKA was one of the largest employers in the printing and publishing business in Greece up to 1985. In 1992 the company was sold by the National Bank of Greece to Jean Jacques Lesueur and in October 1997 it was declared bankrupt.

== History ==
In 1873, Gerasimos Aspiotis founded a playing-card factory in Corfu under the name Elpis (Hope). In 1884, Aspiotis secured a contract with the government of Charilaos Trikoupis as the sole manufacturer of playing cards for Greece. The cards were designed by Gerasimos Aspiotis' father Nikolaos Aspiotis who was a painter.

In 1902 Konstantinos Aspiotis, son of Gerasimos, became the director of the company. Under the directorship of Konstaninos Aspiotis the company product line expanded to include the printing of bonds, shares, advertisements, tickets and other similar products.

After the Balkan Wars and the subsequent expansion of Greek lands, the company increased its market share in an expanded internal market. Sales of its popular playing cards increased significantly and so did the company profits.

In 1935 Liakos Iliopoulos became the director of the company and presided over further expansion which lasted until 1940.

On 28 October 1940, the starting date of the Greco-Italian War, the Italian Air force bombed and destroyed the Aspioti-ELKA factory in Corfu. On that same day the Greek Government, after a lengthy delay of many months, granted Aspioti-ELKA permission to move its machinery and equipment from the Corfu factory to its Athens plant. The machinery moving permit came one day too late as the plant including the machinery now laid in ruins.

The National Bank of Greece keeps a large collection of the company material assets which were manufactured or acquired throughout its history. The bank collection includes stamps, banknotes, advertisements, architectural drawings, financial and statistical tables, an extensive collection of old machinery and other items.

== Gallery ==
The following images are a small sample of postcards printed in three colour lithography by Aspiotis in Corfu, Greece. A full list of the colour postcards of Aspiotis has been created by the collector Nikos D. Karabelas.

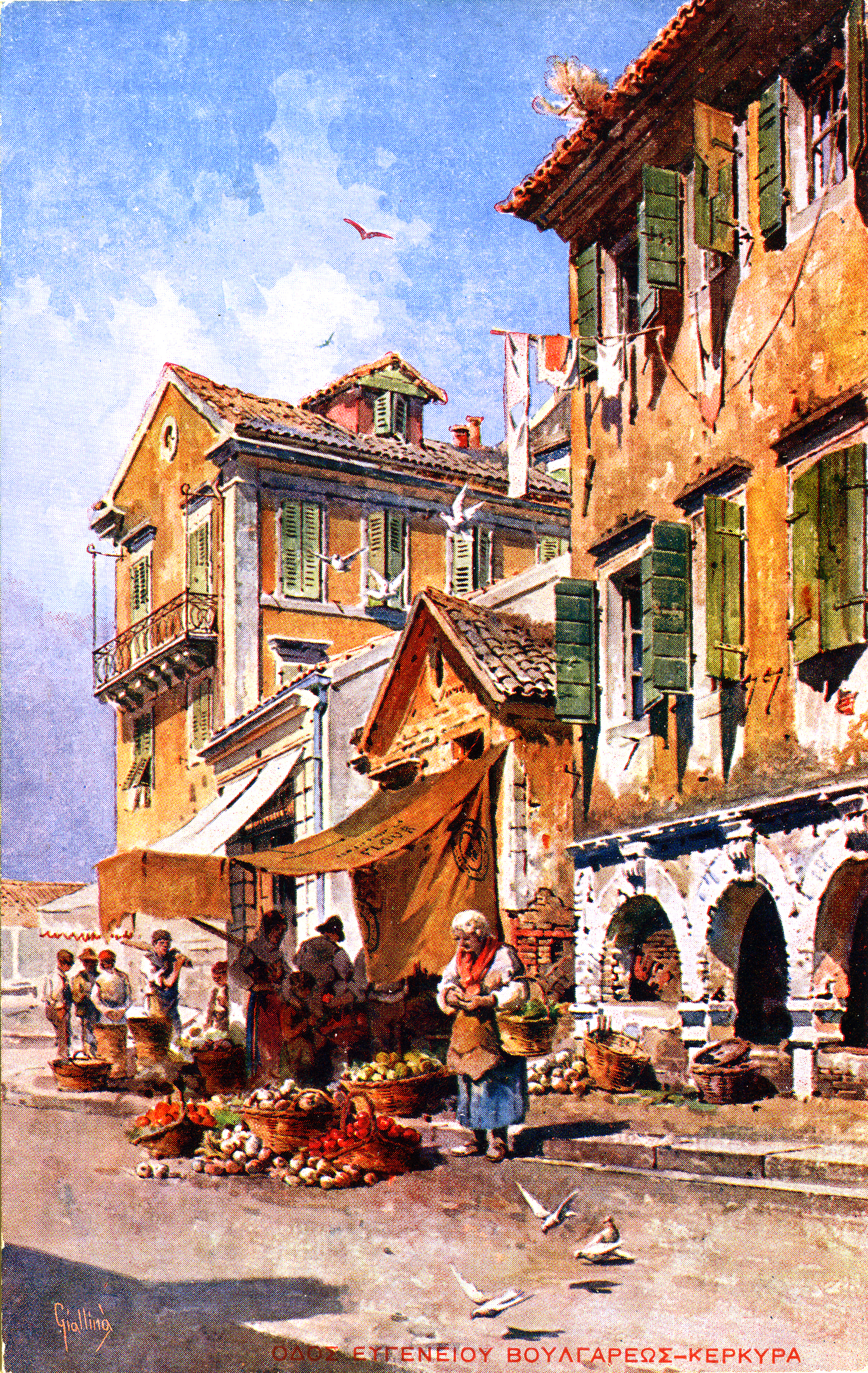
Market place, Corfu (c.1910)

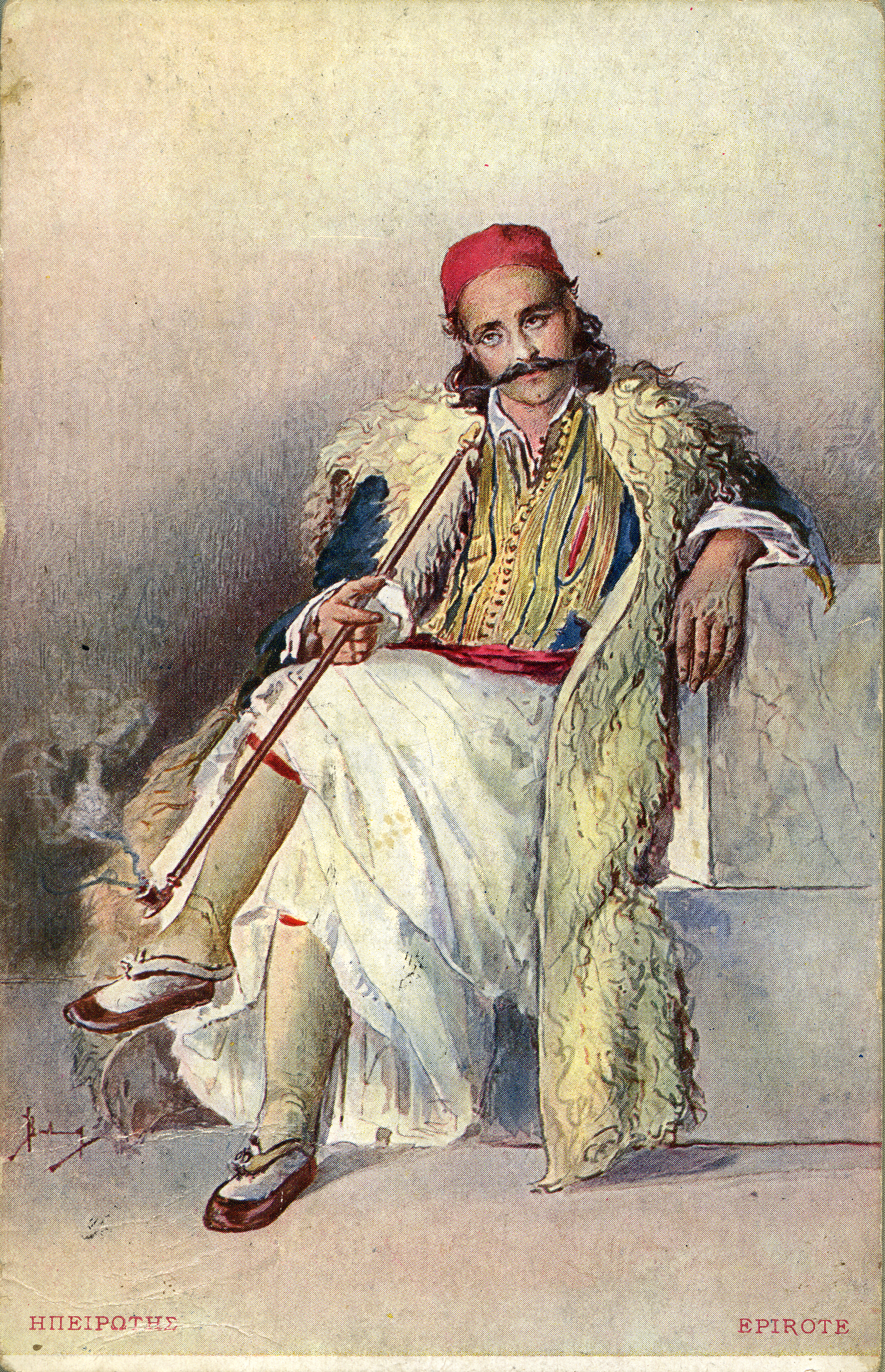
Epirot (c.1910)

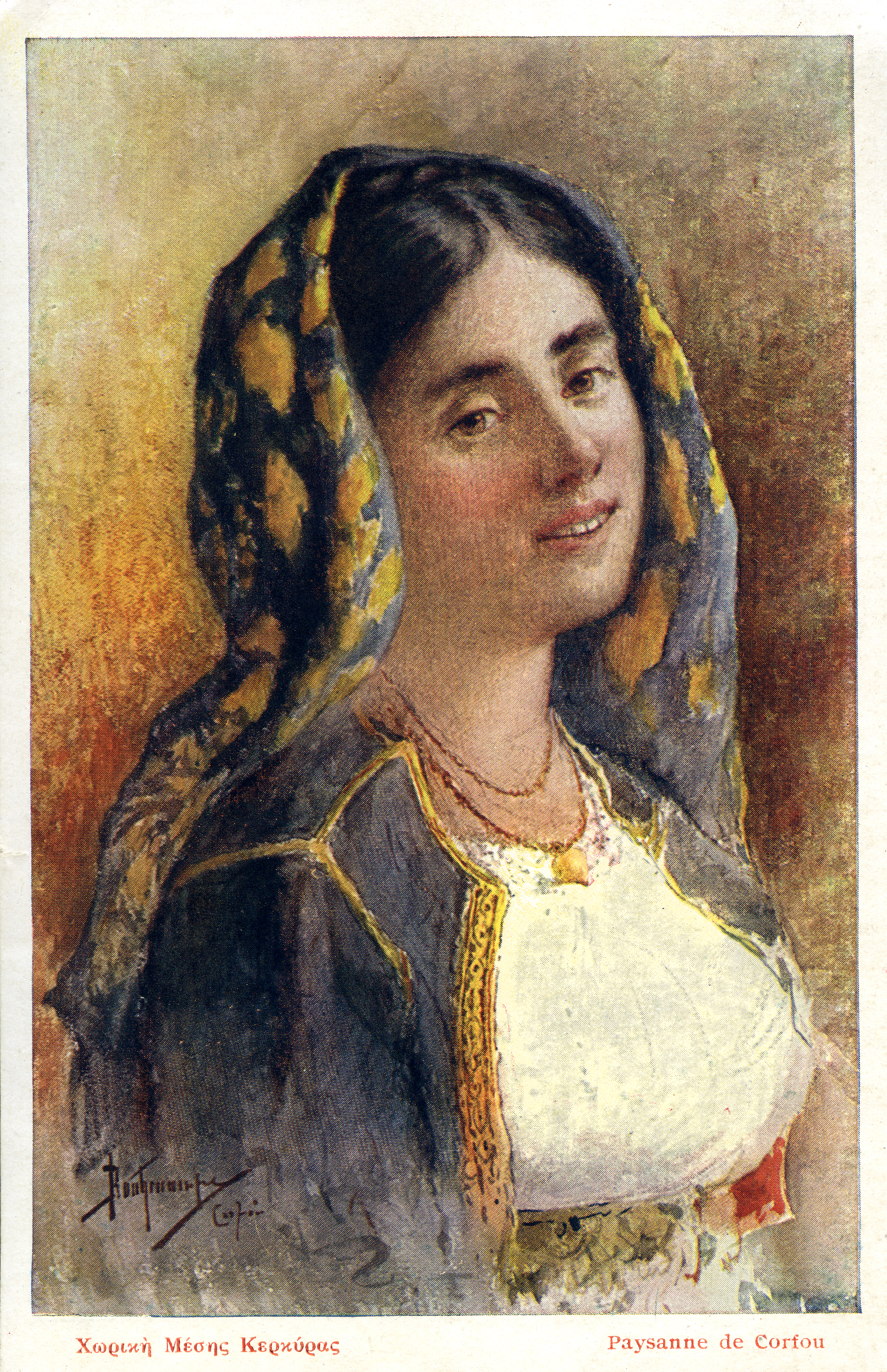
Peasant woman from Mesi, Corfu (c.1910)

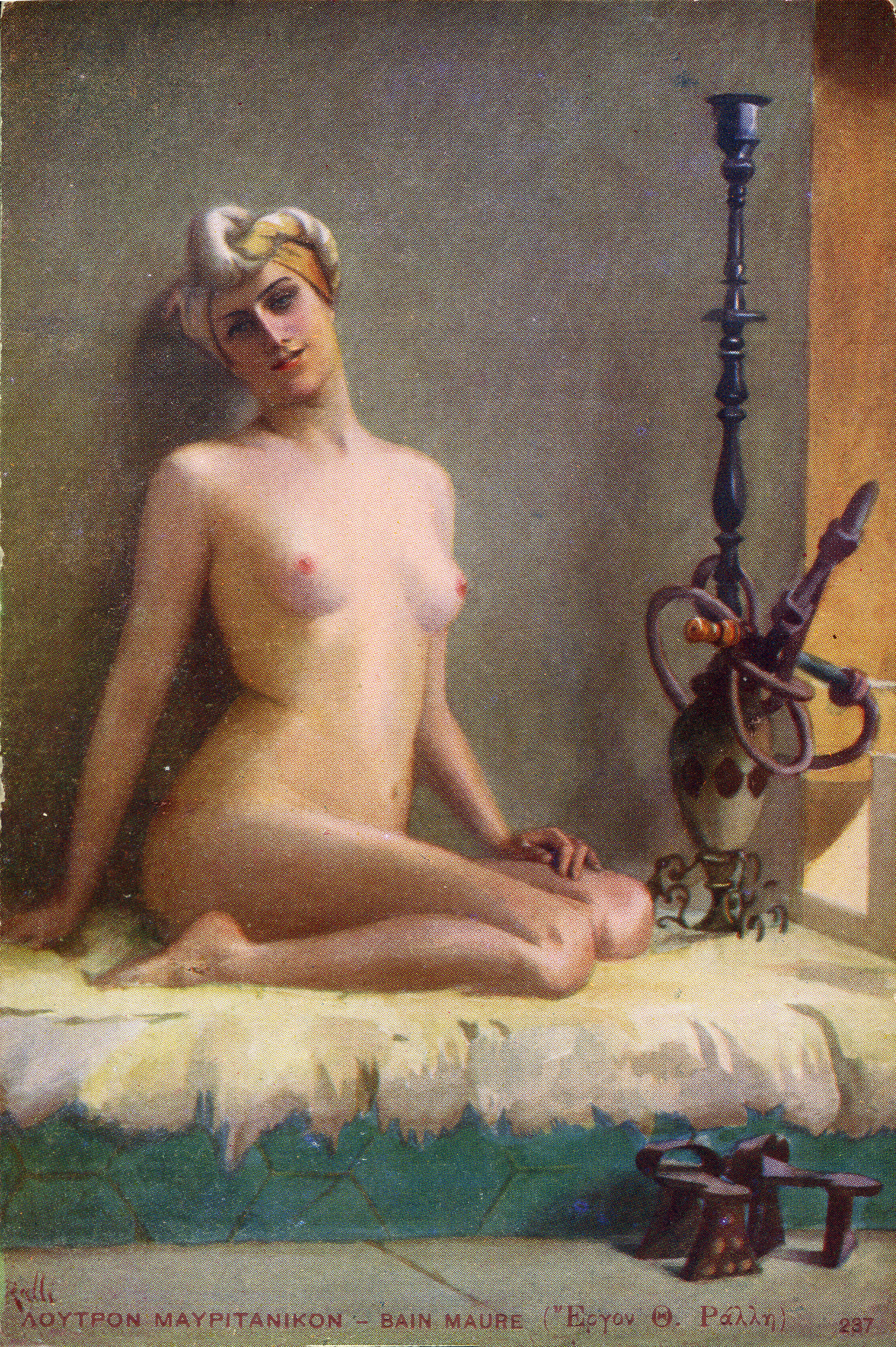
Mauritanian bath (c.1910)
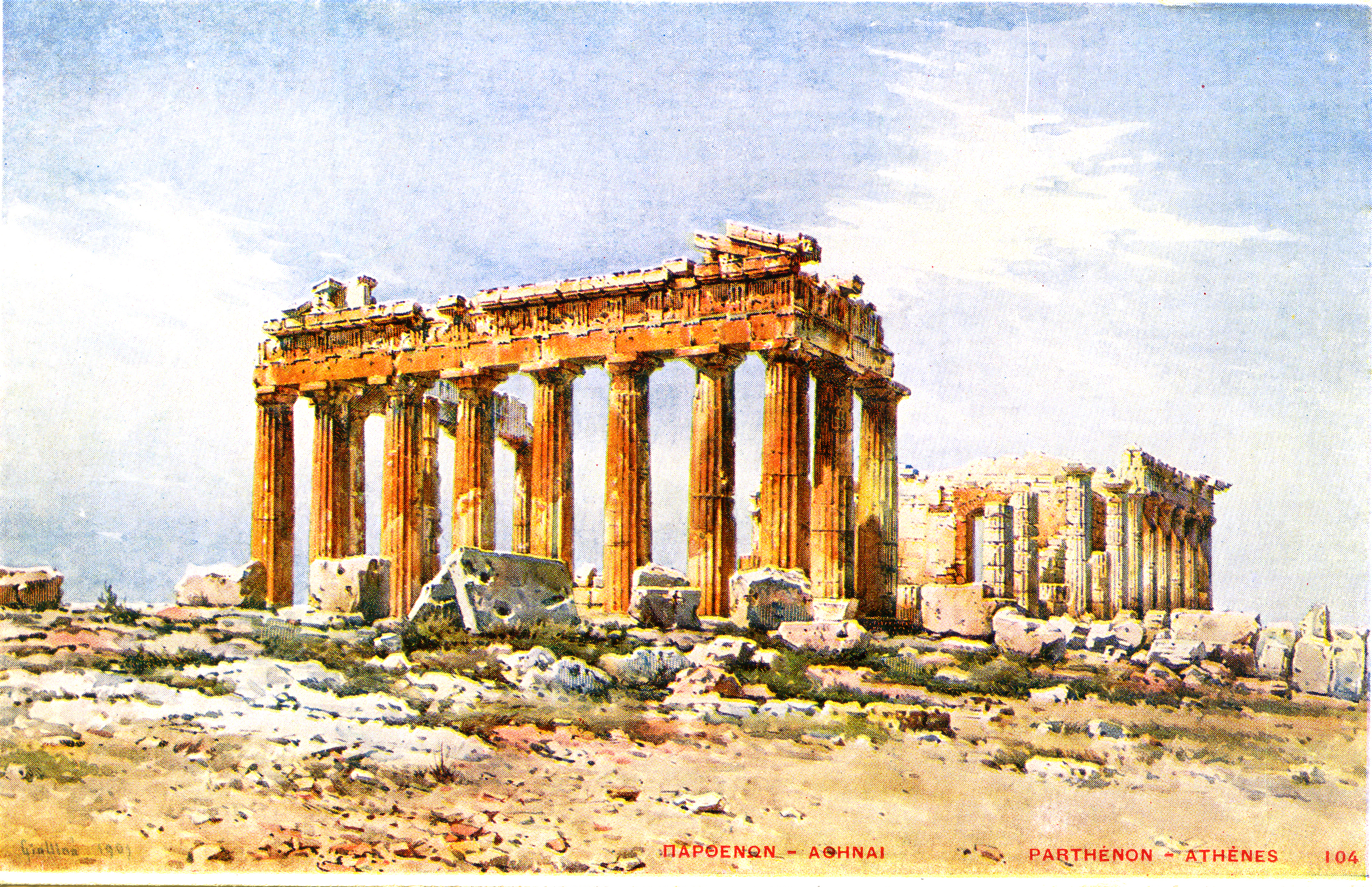
Parthenon of Athens (c.1910)

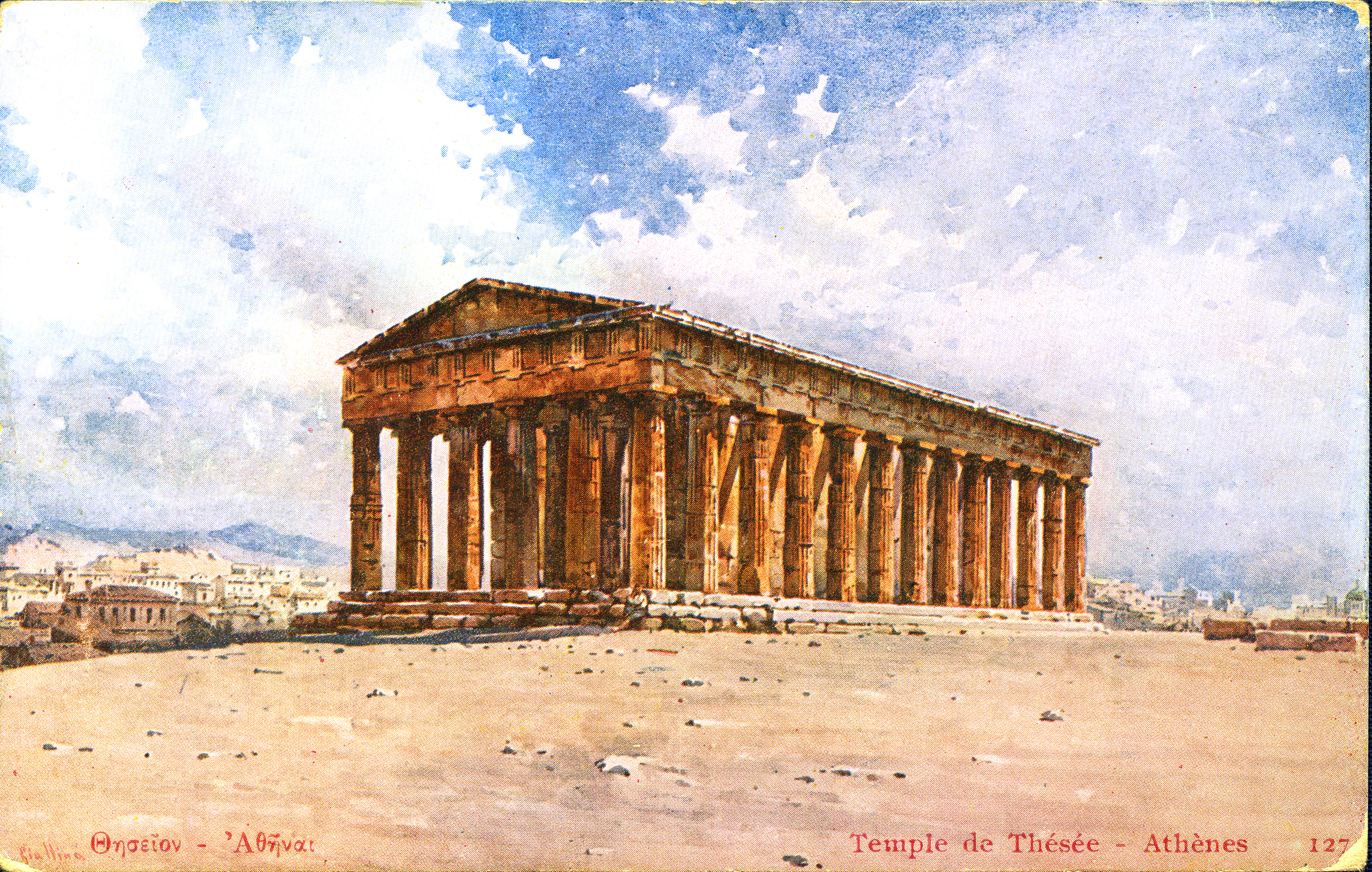
Theseion, Athens (c.1910)

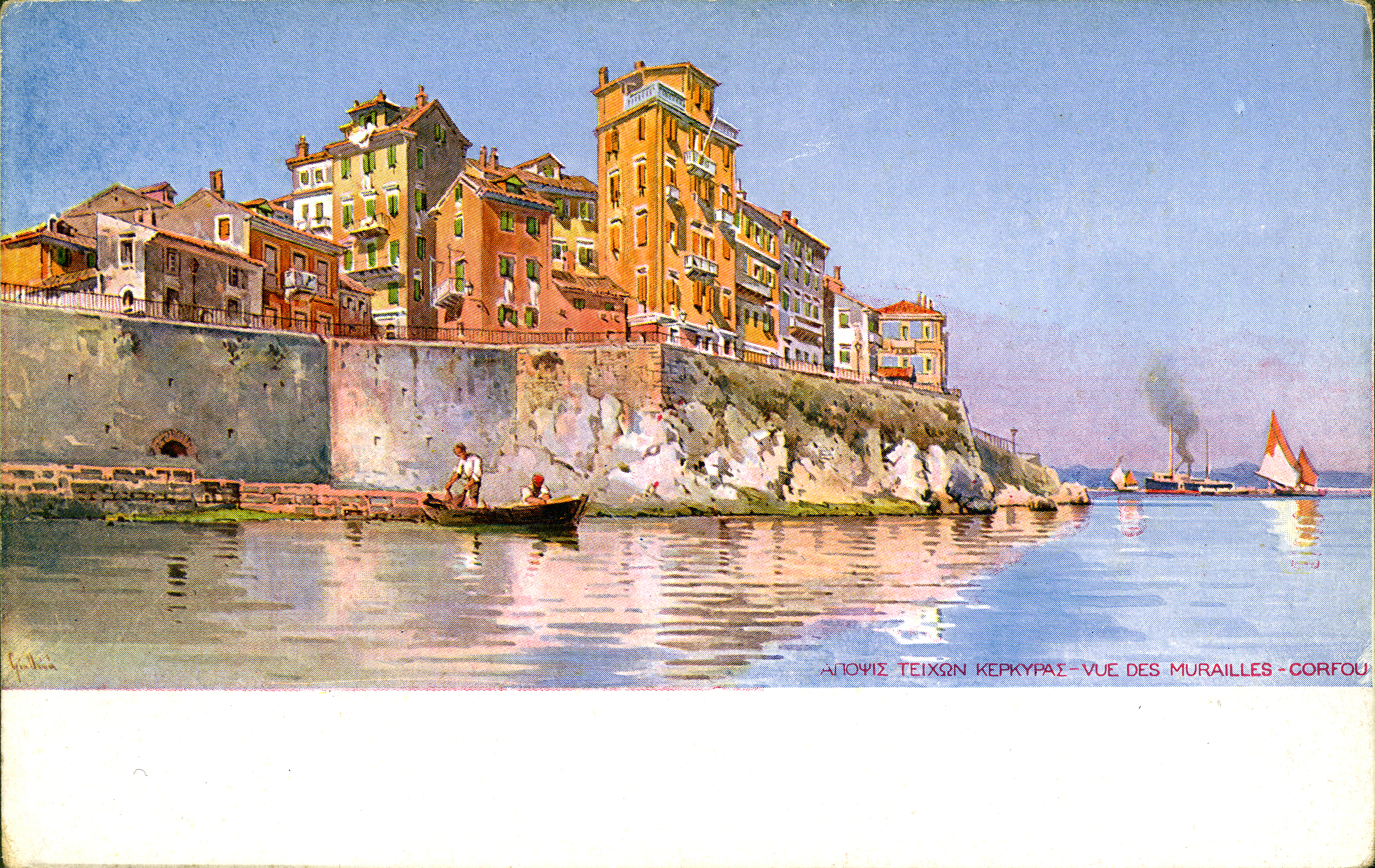
Sea walls, Corfu (c.1910)

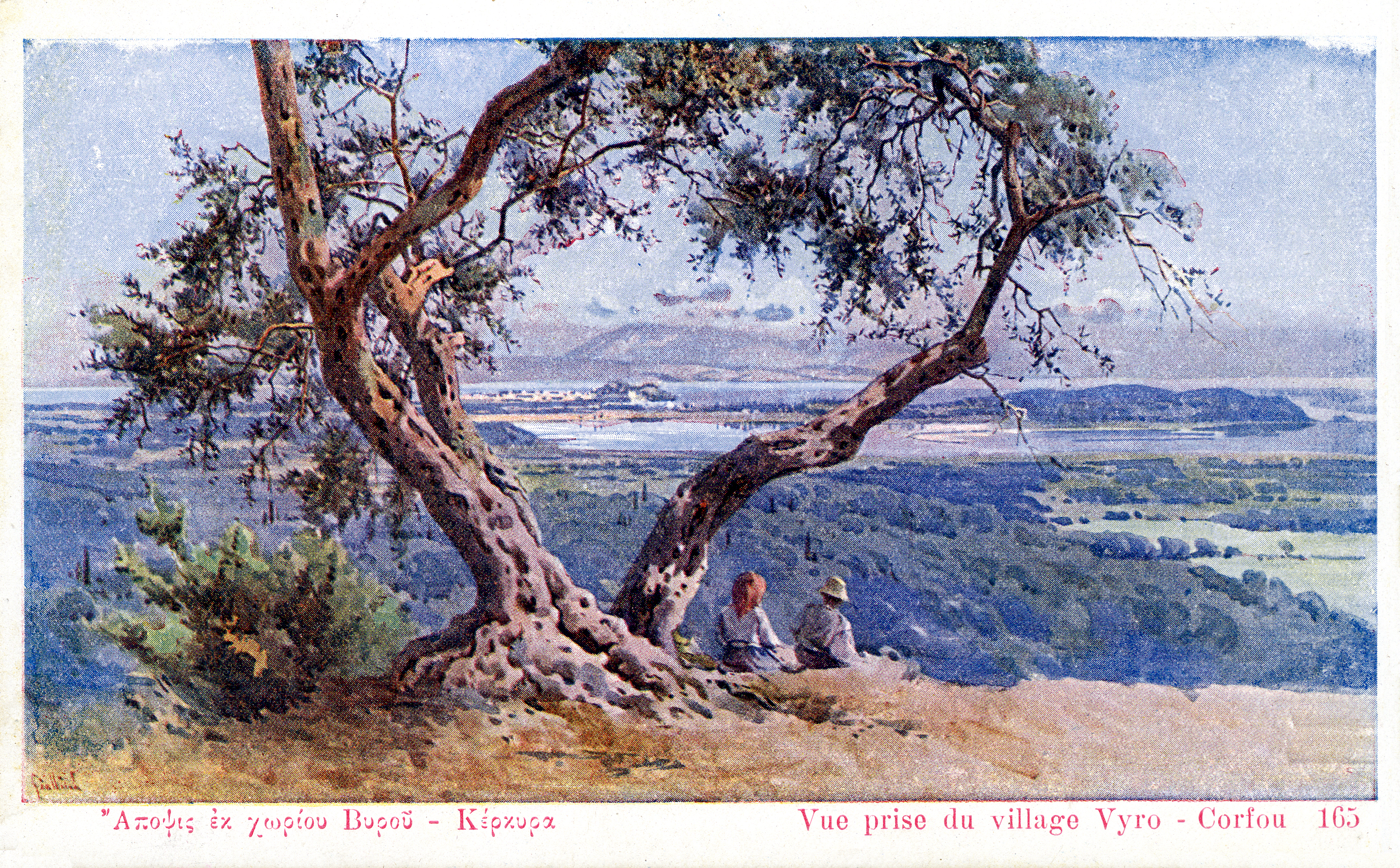
View of Corfu from Viro (c.1910)

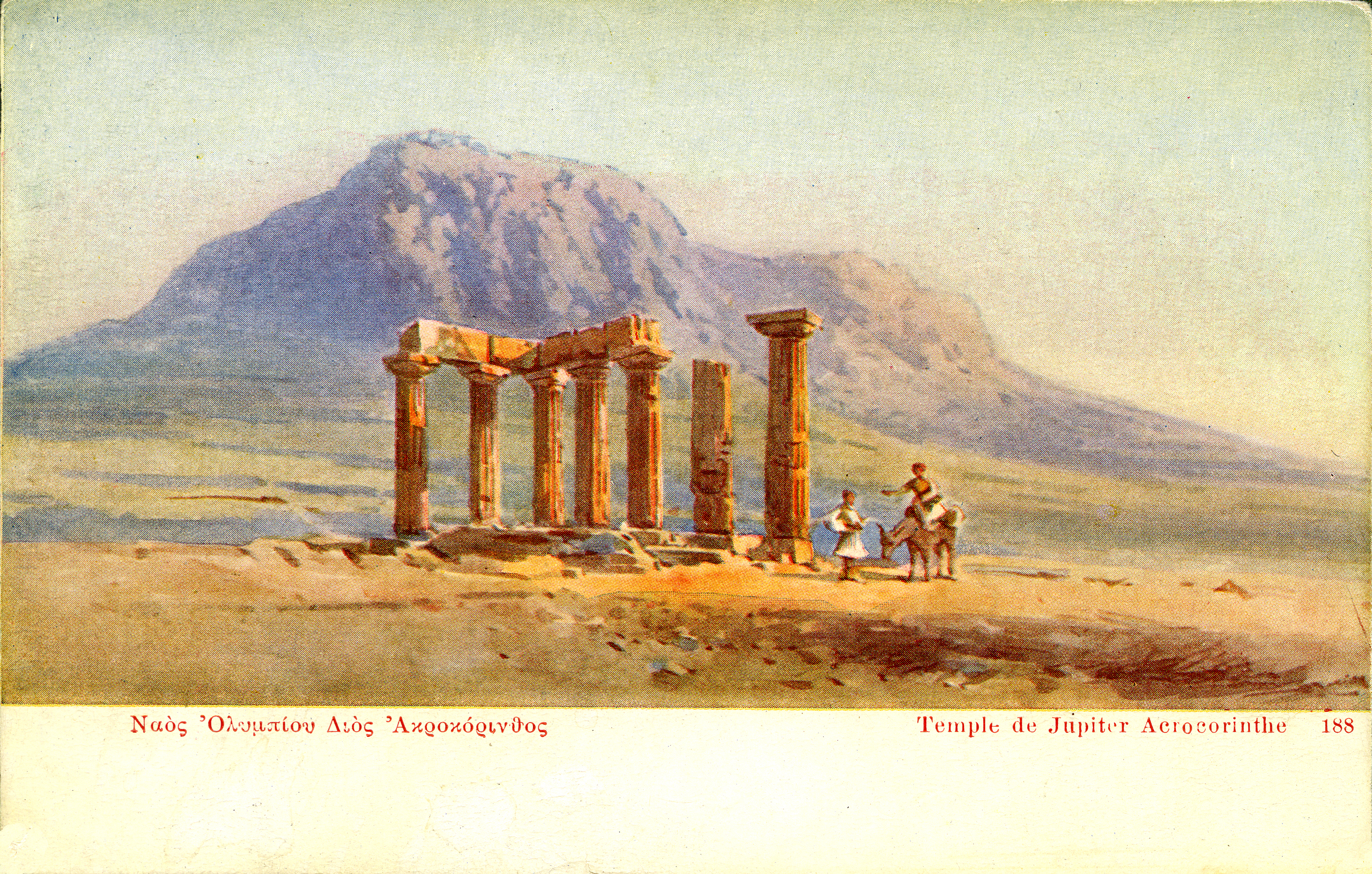
Temple of Zeus, Corinth (c 1910)

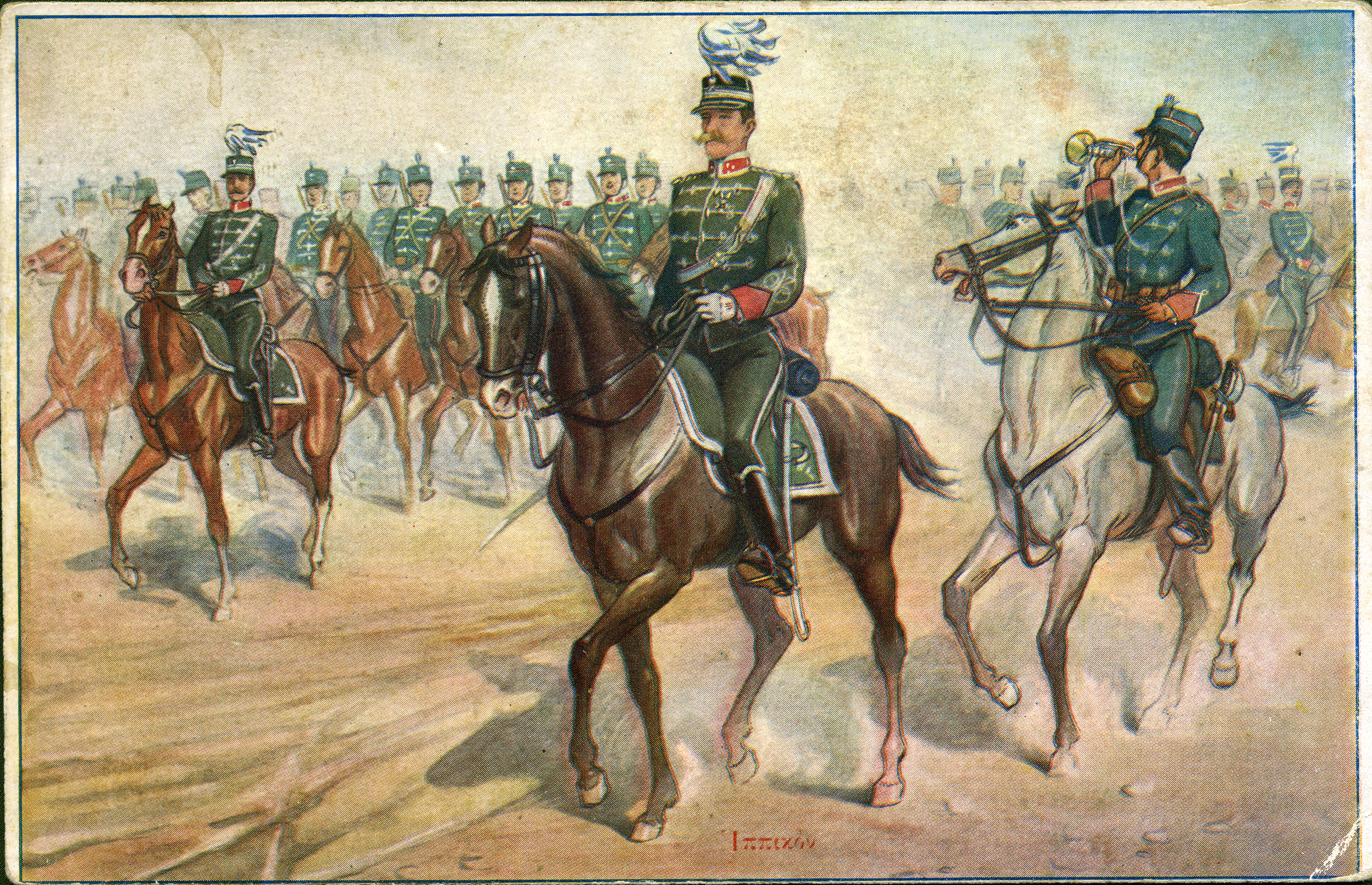
Greek Cavalry (c.1910)

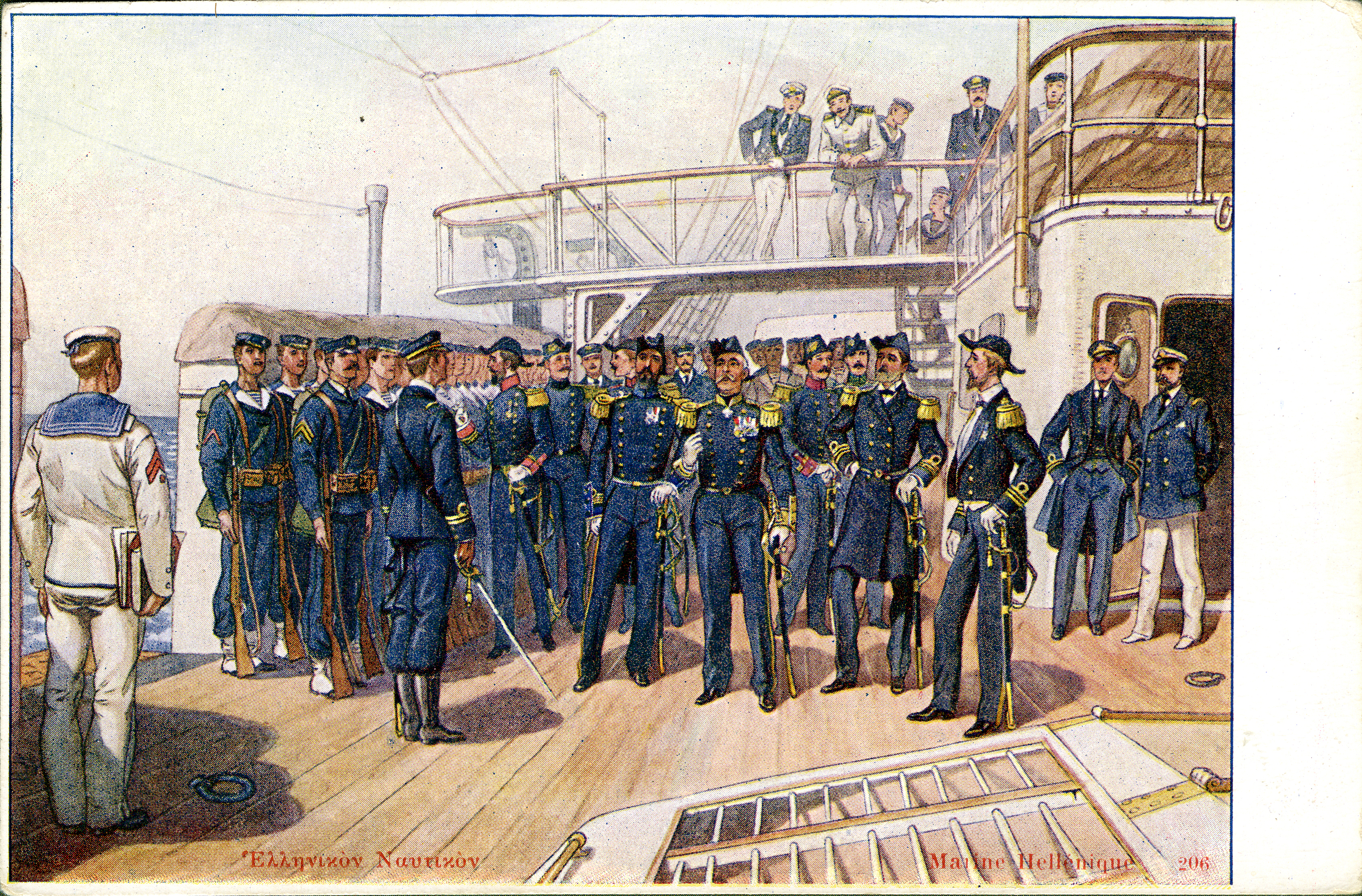
Greek Navy (c.1910)

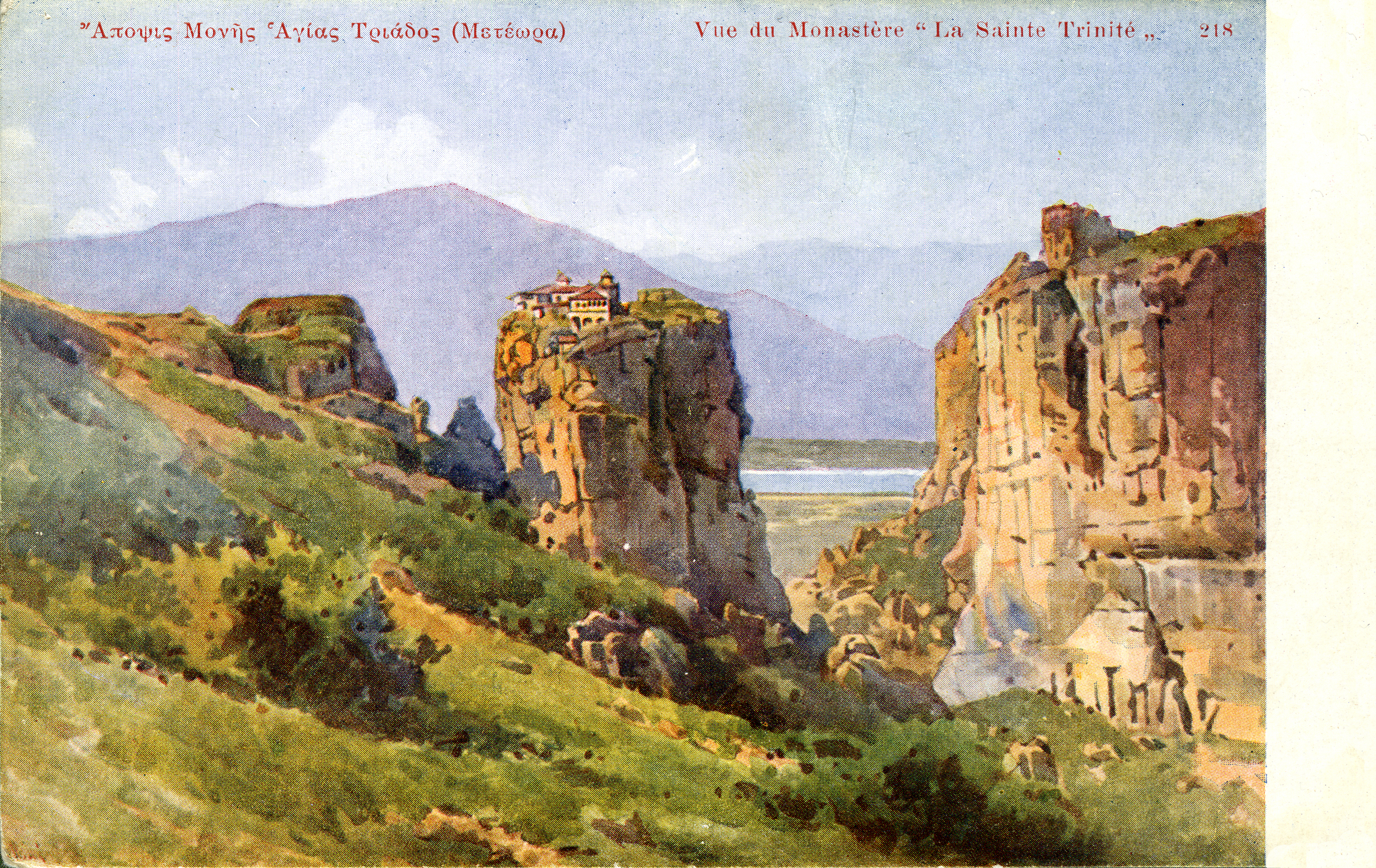
View of Meteora (c.1910)

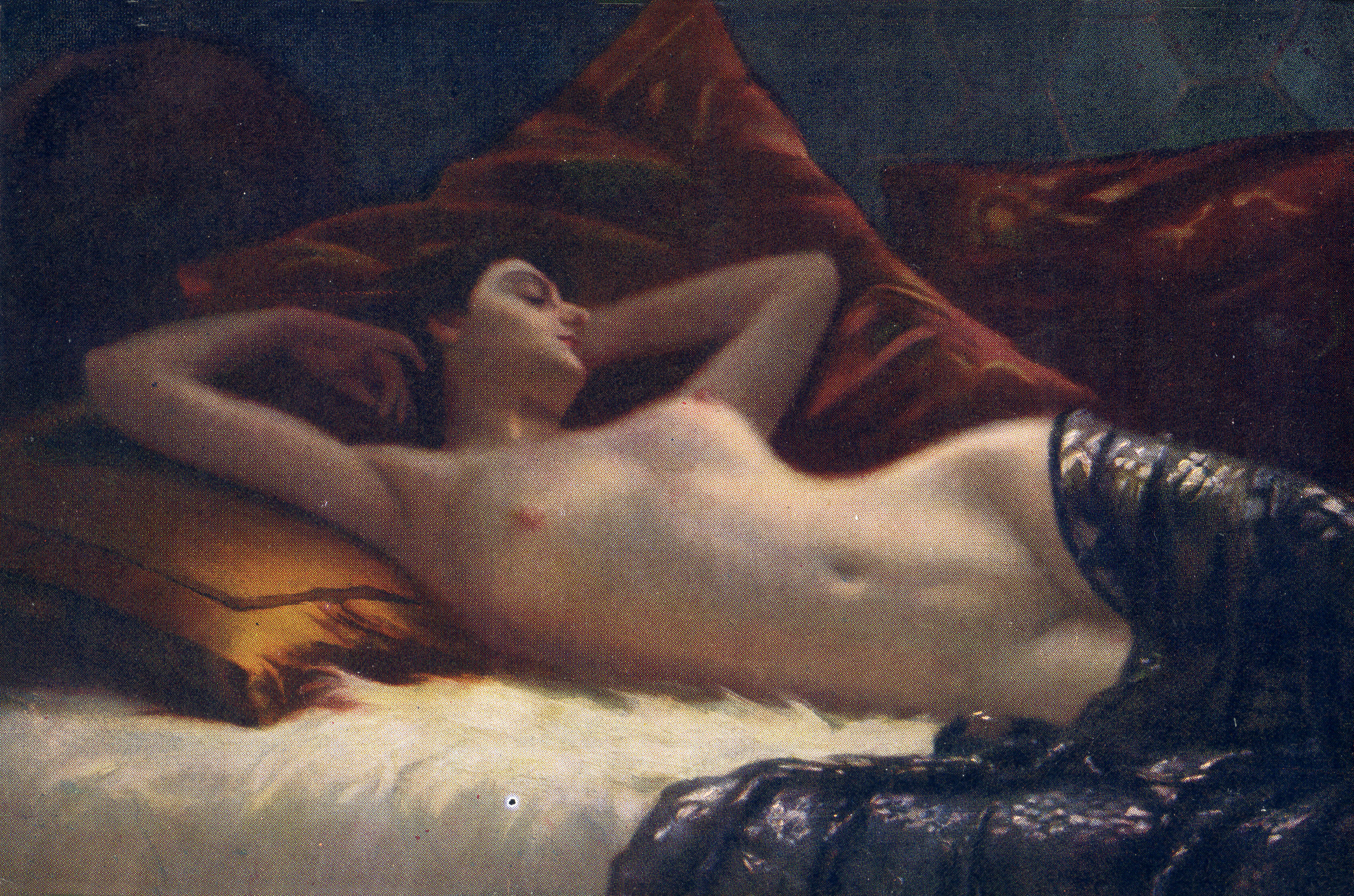
Having a rest (c.1910)

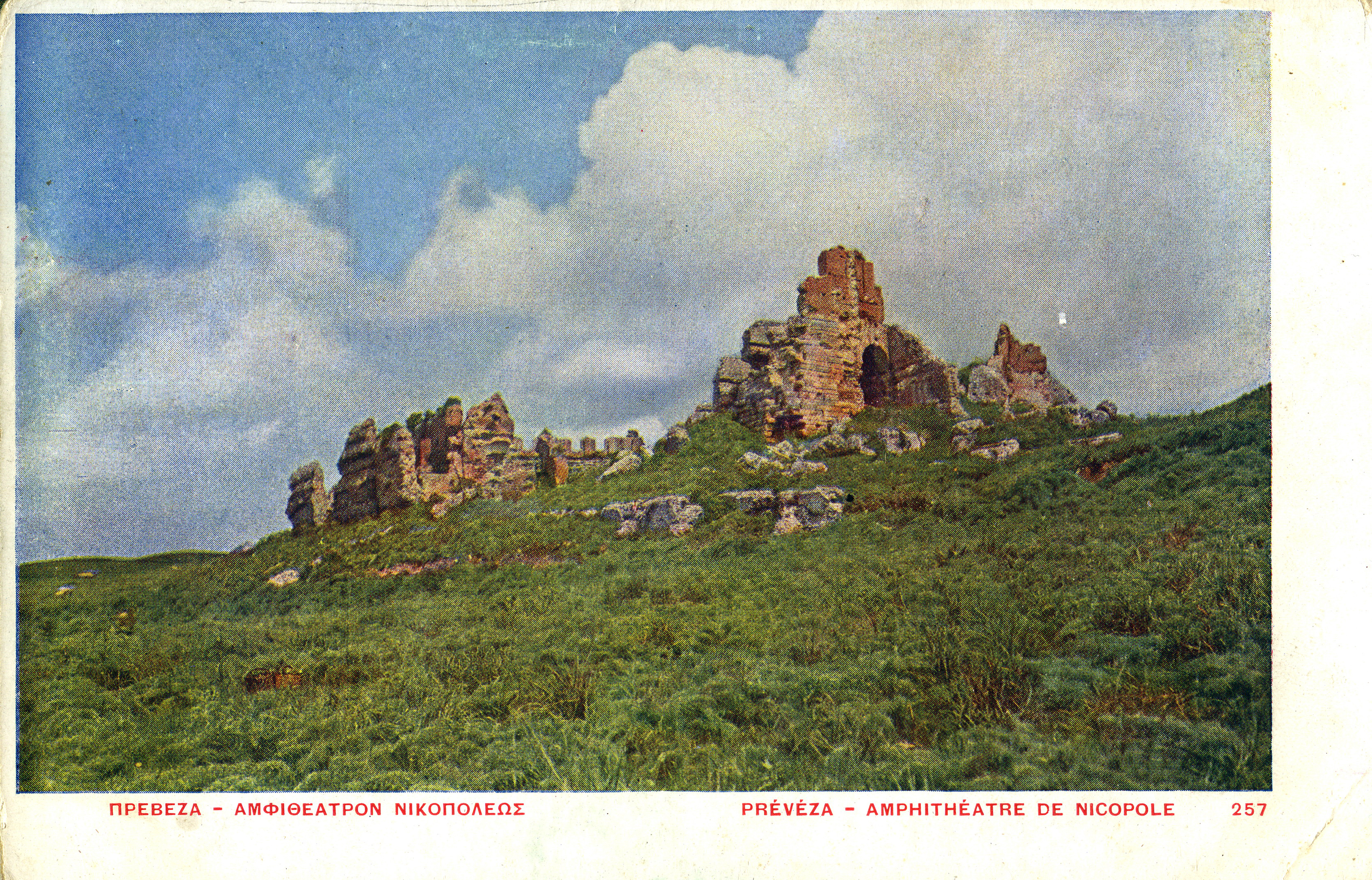
Nicopolis' theatre, Preveza (c.1913)

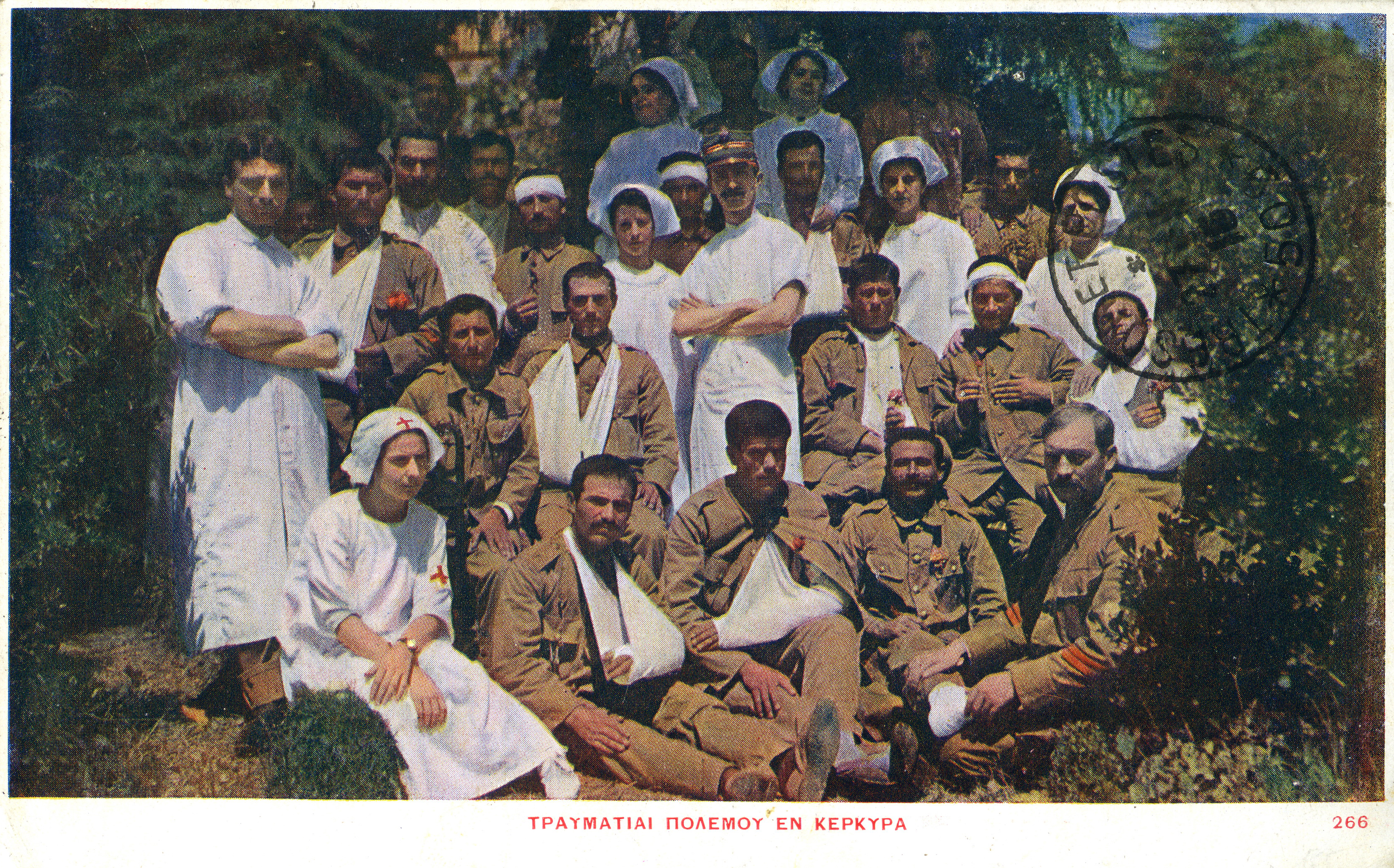
War-injured in Corfu (c.1913)

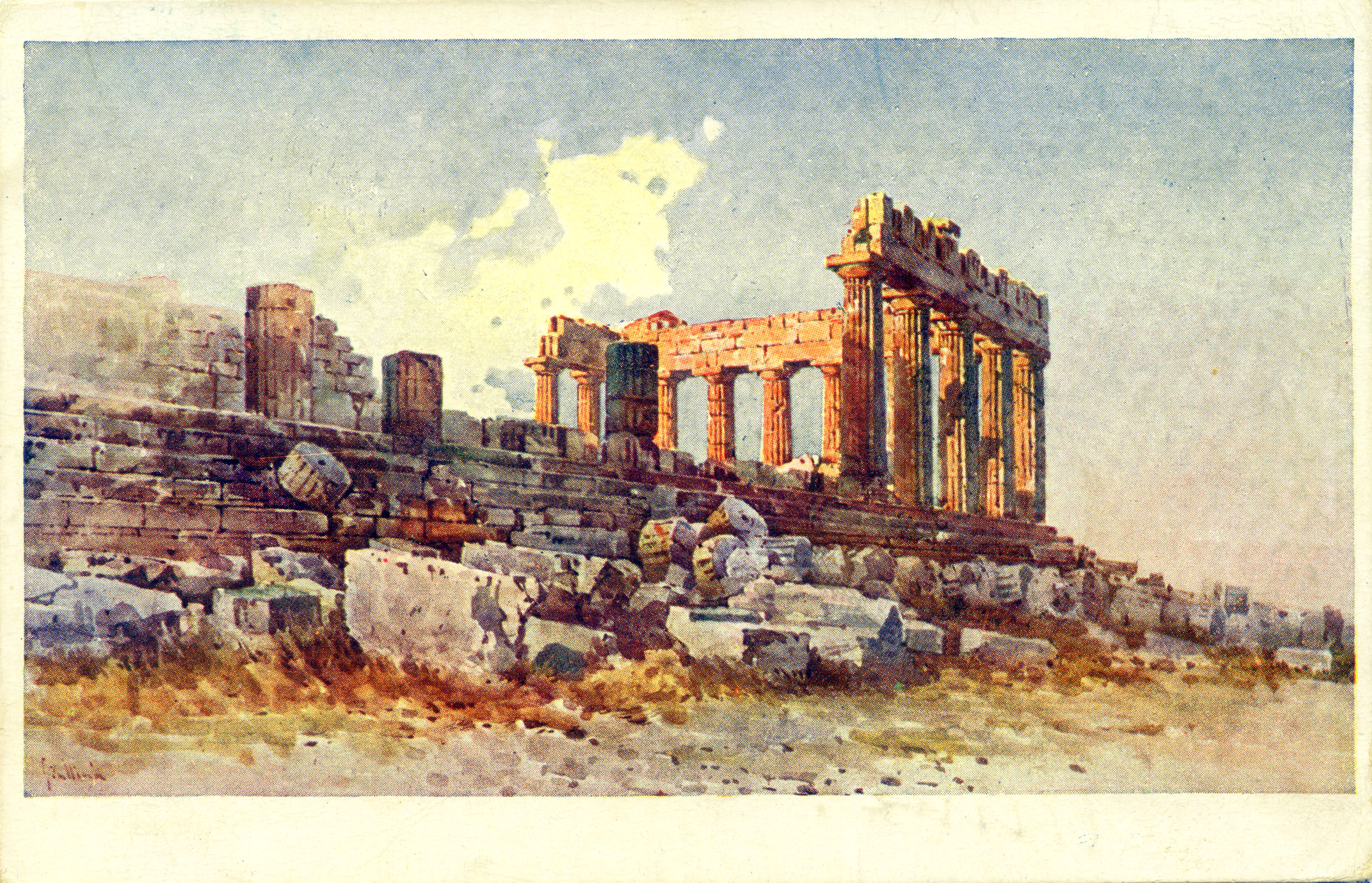
The Parthenon, sunset (c.1920)
