= Norway at the 1908 Summer Olympics =

- IOC code: NOR
- NOC: Central Association for the Dissemination of Sports

in London
- Competitors: 69 in 7 sports
- Flag bearer: Oskar Bye
- Medals Ranked 8th: Gold 2 Silver 3 Bronze 3 Total 8

Summer Olympics appearances (overview)
- 1900; 1904; 1908; 1912; 1920; 1924; 1928; 1932; 1936; 1948; 1952; 1956; 1960; 1964; 1968; 1972; 1976; 1980; 1984; 1988; 1992; 1996; 2000; 2004; 2008; 2012; 2016; 2020; 2024

Other related appearances
- 1906 Intercalated Games

Norway competed at the 1908 Summer Olympics in London, England. It was the second appearance of the European nation, after having made its Olympic debut in 1900.

== Medalists ==
Medal	Name	Sport	Event	Date
Gold	Albert Helgerud	Shooting	Men's 300 m free rifle, three positions	July 11
Gold	Julius Braathe, Albert Helgerud, Einar Liberg, Olaf Sæther, Ole Sæther, Gudbrand Skatteboe	Shooting	Men's 300 m free rifle, team	July 10
Silver	Arne Halse	Athletics	Men's javelin throw	July 17
Silver	Arthur Amundsen; Carl Andersen; Otto Authén; Hermann Bohne; Trygve Bøyesen; Oskar Bye; Conrad Carlsrud; Sverre Grøner; Harald Halvorsen; Harald Hansen; Petter Hol; Eugen Ingebretsen; Ole Iversen; Per Jespersen; Sigge Johannessen; Nicolai Kiær; Carl Klæth; Thor Larsen; Rolf Lefdahl; Hans Lem; Anders Moen; Frithjof Olsen; Carl Pedersen; Paul Pedersen; Sigvard Sivertsen; John Skrataas; Harald Smedvik; Andreas Strand; Olaf Syvertsen; Thomas Thorstensen	Gymnastics	Men's team	July 16
Silver	Jacob Gundersen	Wrestling	Men's freestyle heavyweight	July 23
Bronze	Edvard Larsen	Athletics	Men's triple jump	July 25
Bronze	Arne Halse	Athletics	Men's freestyle javelin	July 15
Bronze	Ole Sæther	Shooting	Men's 300 m free rifle, three positions	July 11

== Results by event ==
=== Athletics ===
Norway's best athletics result was Arne Halse's silver medal in the javelin throw.

Event	Place	Athlete	Heats	Semifinals	Final
Men's 100 metres	Heats	Oscar Guttormsen	12.0 seconds 2nd, heat 2	Did not advance	
Men's 100 metres	Heats	John Johansen	11.7 seconds 2nd, heat 5	Did not advance	
Men's 200 metres	Semi- finalist	Oscar Guttormsen	Walkover; 1st, heat 14	Unknown; 4th, semifinal 1	Did not advance
Men's 400 metres	Heats	Oscar Guttormsen	Unknown; 2nd, heat 5	Did not advance	
Men's 1500 metres	Semi- finalist	Oscar Larsen	None held	Unknown; 4th, semifinal 8	Did not advance
Men's 1500 metres	Semi- finalist	Nils Dahl	None held	Unknown; 7th, semifinal 1	Did not advance
Men's 110 metre hurdles	Heats	Wilhelm Blystad	Unknown; 2nd, heat 11	Did not advance	
Men's 110 metre hurdles	Heats	Oscar Guttormsen	Unknown; 2nd, heat 12	Did not advance	

Event	Place	Athlete	Height/ Distance
Men's high jump	13th	Henry Olsen	1.72 metres
Men's high jump	—	Otto Monsen	No mark
Men's long jump	21-32	Henry Olsen	Unknown
Men's triple jump	3rd	Edvard Larsen	14.39 metres
Men's triple jump	13th	Henry Olsen	13.17 metres
Men's triple jump	14th	Oscar Guttormsen	13.16 metres
Men's standing high jump	8th	Wilhelm Blystad	1.42 metres
Men's shot put	9-25	Arne Halse	Unknown
Men's discus throw	12-42	John Falchenberg	Unknown
Men's javelin throw	2nd	Arne Halse	50.57 metres
Men's javelin throw	8-16	John Johansen	Unknown
Men's freestyle javelin	3rd	Arne Halse	49.73 metres
Men's freestyle javelin	10-33	Conrad Carlsrud	Unknown
Men's freestyle javelin	10-33	John Johansen	Unknown

=== Fencing ===
Event	Place	Fencer	First round	Second round	Semi- final	Final
Men's épée	First round	Hans Bergsland	4-4 (6th in D)	Did not advance		

=== Gymnastics ===
Gymnast	Event	Score	Rank
Conrad Carlsrud	Men's all-around	124	84
Petter Hol	Men's all-around	152.5	70
Eugen Ingebretsen	Men's all-around	109	94
Ole Iversen	Men's all-around	117	92
Per Mathias Jespersen	Men's all-around	120.5	87
Carl Klæth	Men's all-around	142	76
Frithjof Olsen	Men's all-around	127.5	82
John Skrataas	Men's all-around	154.5	67

Event	Place	Gymnast	Score
Men's team	2nd	Carl Albert Andersen, Hermann Bohne, Trygve Bøyesen, Oskar Bye, Conrad Carlsrud, Sverre Grøner, Harald Halvorsen, Harald Hansen, Petter Hol, Eugen Ingebretsen, Ole Iversen, Per Mathias Jespersen, Sigge Johannessen, Nicolai Kiær, Carl Klæth, Thor Larsen, Rolf Lefdahl, Hans Lem, Anders Moen, Frithjof Olsen, Carl Alfred Pedersen, Paul Pedersen, Sigvard Sivertsen, John Skrataas, Harald Smedvik, Andreas Strand, Olaf Syvertsen, Thomas Thorstensen	425

=== Rowing ===
Event	Place	Rowers	First round	Quarter- finals	Semi- finals	Final
Men's eight	5th	Otto Krogh, Erik Bye, Ambrosius Høyer, Gustav Hæhre, Emil Irgens, Hannibal Fegth, Wilhelm Hansen, Annan Knudsen, Ejnar Tønsager	None held	Unknown; 2nd, quarterfinal 1	Did not advance	

=== Sailing ===
Class	Place	Boat	Sailors
8 metre	4th	Fram	Johan Anker, Einar Hvoslef, Hagbart Steffens, Magnus Konow, Eilert Falch-Lund

=== Shooting ===
Event	Place	Shooter	Score
Men's 1000 yard free rifle	28th	Jørgen Bru	82
Men's 1000 yard free rifle	40th	Georg Erdmann	61
Men's 1000 yard free rifle	41st	Asmund Enger	58
Men's 1000 yard free rifle	41st	Kolbjørn Kvam	58
Men's 1000 yard free rifle	47th	Mathias Glomnes	26
Men's 1000 yard free rifle	AC	Olivius Skymoen	
Men's 300 metre free rifle	1st	Albert Helgerud	909
Men's 300 metre free rifle	3rd	Ole Sæther	883
Men's 300 metre free rifle	6th	Julius Braathe	851
Men's 300 metre free rifle	9th	Olaf Sæther	830
Men's 300 metre free rifle	13th	Georg Erdmann	821
Men's 300 metre free rifle	19th	Kolbjørn Kvam	777
Men's 300 metre free rifle	24th	Olivius Skymoen	760
Men's 300 metre free rifle	26th	Per Olaf Olsen	752
Men's 300 metre free rifle	47th	Mathias Glomnes	563
Men's team free rifle	1st	Albert Helgerud; Ole Sæther; Gudbrand Gudbrandsen Skatteboe; Olaf Sæther; Julius Braathe; Einar Liberg	5055
Men's team military rifle	6th	Ole Sæther; Einar Liberg; Gudbrand Gudbrandsen Skatteboe; Albert Helgerud; Mathias Glomnes; Jørgen Bru	2192

=== Wrestling ===
Event	Place	Wrestler	Round of 16	Quarter- finals	Semi- finals	Final
Freestyle heavyweight	2nd	Jacob Gundersen	Defeated; West	Defeated; Humphreys	Defeated; Nixson	Lost to O'Kelly

Opponent nation	Wins	Losses	Percent
Great Britain	3	1	.750
Total	3	1	.750

== Sources ==
- Cook, Theodore Andrea (1908). The Fourth Olympiad, Being the Official Report. London: British Olympic Association.
- De Wael, Herman (2001). "Top London 1908 Olympians". Herman's Full Olympians. Archived from the original on 12 July 2006.
