= Norway at the 1906 Intercalated Games =

Norway at the Olympics

- IOC code: NOR
- NOC: Central Association for the Dissemination of Sports

in Athens
- Competitors: 32 in 3 sports
- Medals Ranked 17th: Gold 1 Silver 1 Bronze 0 Total 2

Summer appearances
- 1900; ~~1904~~; 1908; 1912; 1920; 1924; 1928; 1932; 1936; 1948; 1952; 1956; 1960; 1964; 1968; 1972; 1976; 1980; 1984; 1988; 1992; 1996; 2000; 2004; 2008; 2012; 2016; 2020; 2024; 2028

Winter appearances
- 1924; 1928; 1932; 1936; 1948; 1952; 1956; 1960; 1964; 1968; 1972; 1976; 1980; 1984; 1988; 1992; 1994; 1998; 2002; 2006; 2010; 2014; 2018; 2022; 2026

Norway competed at the 1906 Intercalated Games in Athens, Greece. 32 athletes, all men, competed in 12 events in 3 sports.

== Athletics ==
Track

Athlete	Events	Final	
Athlete	Events	Result	Rank
Fritz Skullerud	5 mile	Did not finish	

Field

Athlete	Events	Final	
Athlete	Events	Result	Rank
Halfdan Bjølgerud	High Jump	1.675	6
Otto Haug	Pole Vault	3.000	5
Oscar Guttormsen	Triple Jump	13.340	4
Carl Alfred Pedersen	Triple Jump	12.680	8
Arne Halse	Javelin Throw, Freestyle	43.600	7
Conrad Carlsrud	Javelin Throw, Freestyle	Unknown	8

== Gymnastics ==
Athlete	Events	Final	
Athlete	Events	Points	Rank
Carl Albert Andersen	Individual All-Around, 5 events	80	23

In the team all-round event, teams could consist of between 8 and 20 gymnasts, Norway won the (gold)

- Team

- Carl Albert Andersen
- Oskar Bye
- Conrad Carlsrud
- Harald Eriksen
- Oswald Falch
- Kristian Fjerdingen
- Yngvar Fredriksen
- Karl Haagensen
- Harald Halvorsen
- Petter Hol
- Andreas Hagelund
- Eugen Ingebretsen
- Per Mathias Jespersen
- Finn Münster
- Frithjof Olsen
- Carl Alfred Pedersen
- Rasmus Pettersen
- Thorleif Petersen
- Thorleiv Røhn
- Johan Stumpf

== Shooting ==
Athlete	Event	Target Hits	Points	Rank
Ole Tobias Olsen	Military Revolver, 20 metres	30	187	29
Albert Helgerud	Military Revolver, 20 metres	26	129	31
Gudbrand Skatteboe; Julius Braathe; Albert Helgerud; John Møller; Ole Holm	Free Rifle, 3 positions 300 metres Team	599	4534	2nd place, silver medalist(s)
Gudbrand Skatteboe	Free Rifle any position, 300 metres	30	230	4
Albert Helgerud	Free Rifle any position, 300 metres	30	230	5
Julius Braathe	Free Rifle any position, 300 metres	30	224	6
Ole Holm	Free Rifle any position, 300 metres	30	222	9
John Møller	Free Rifle any position, 300 metres	30	219	11
Ole Tobias Olsen	Free Rifle any position, 300 metres	30	216	12
John Møller	Rifle Gras Model Kneeling or Standing, 200 metres	28	175	4
Gudbrand Skatteboe	Rifle Gras Model Kneeling or Standing, 200 metres	27	139	14
Ole Holm	Rifle Gras Model Kneeling or Standing, 200 metres	24	136	16
Albert Helgerud	Rifle Gras Model Kneeling or Standing, 200 metres	24	129	19
Ole Tobias Olsen	Rifle Gras Model Kneeling or Standing, 200 metres	24	128	21
Julius Braathe	Rifle Gras Model Kneeling or Standing, 200 metres	22	98	26
Asmund Enger	Rifle Gras Model Kneeling or Standing, 200 metres	19	80	29
Julius Braathe	Rifle Kneeling or Standing, 300 metres	30	233	6
Gudbrand Skatteboe	Rifle Kneeling or Standing, 300 metres	30	221	8
Ole Holm	Rifle Kneeling or Standing, 300 metres	30	217	9
Ole Tobias Olsen	Rifle Kneeling or Standing, 300 metres	30	213	11
Albert Helgerud	Rifle Kneeling or Standing, 300 metres	30	203	12
John Møller	Rifle Kneeling or Standing, 300 metres	30	195	15
Asmund Enger	Rifle Kneeling or Standing, 300 metres	26	189	19
