= Norebo =

Fishing enterprise in Russia

Norebo Holding
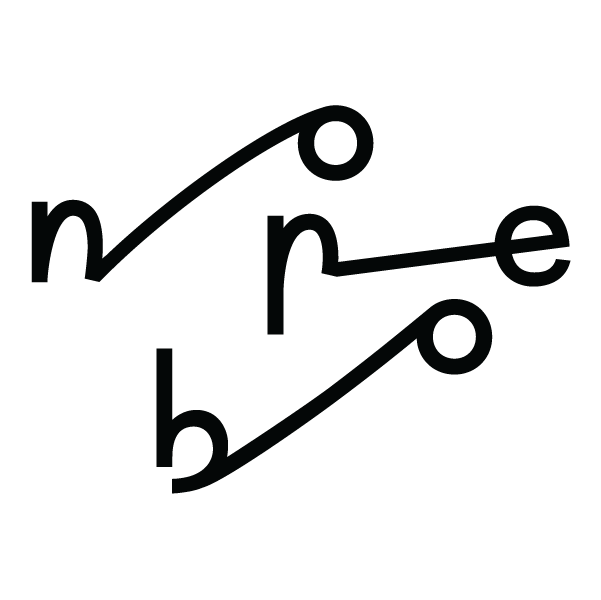
- Industry: Fishing
- Founded: since 1997 as Ocean Trawlers, since 1998 as Karat, since 2016 as Norebo
- Headquarters: Murmansk, Russia
- Key people: Vitaly Orlov, Magnus Roth, Alexander Tugushev
- Number of employees: over 3000
- Website: norebo.ru

Norebo Holding is a vertically integrated fishing holding, one of the largest in Russia. It includes fishing companies located in Russian North-West and Far East, trading companies, a fish processing plant and a cargo handling terminal with cold storages and berthing facilities.

== History ==
The business was established in the mid-1990s when Vitaly Orlov, a graduate from Murmansk High Marine School, joined efforts with Swedish entrepreneur Magnus Roth. They worked together at Norwegian fish-trading company Scandsea Int., AS, which was buying fish from Russian fishing companies based in Murmansk. In 1997 they established Ocean Trawlers A/S. Aside from buying fish, the company began renting Norwegian trawlers. Bareboat charters were crucial for the post-Soviet fishing industry, as vessels left from the All-Union Fishery Association were outdated.

One of fish sellers for Orlov and Roth was Alexander Tugushev, a former classmate who had founded his own Russian fishing company. In 1998 Tugushev joined Ocean Trawlers as a partner, and they formed a holding company called Karat.

In September 2003, Tugushev became Deputy Head of Russia's State Fisheries Committee (Goskomrybolovstvo) responsible for the development of a new system for distribution of fishing quotas. Because of occupying the civil servant position, Tugushev had to re-register his rights to holding's shares to the third parties. Later, a Russian court found Tugushev to be guilty of bribery, he was jailed for 6 years and therefore later banned from visiting Britain (see Norebo conflict for details).

Until 2016, the company was called Karat Fishing Holding, and the name Norebo was taken in 2016.

== Present days ==
Norebo Holding is the largest taxpayer and employer in the city of Murmansk (pop. ~300 000) — a significant Russian Arctic stronghold situated within the boundaries of the Arctic Circle. Several companies of the holding are included in the list of systemically important organizations of the agro-industrial complex of Russia (compiled by the Ministry of Agriculture of the Russian Federation).

Holding supports environmental projects aimed at preserving fishing fields.

The companies of Norebo Group (in particular, PJSC Murmansk Trawl Fleet, JSC Rybprominvest) are the major sponsors in Murmansk oblast of the United Russia political party.

The holding builds new vessels, factories and a refrigerator terminal. It is also involved in the development of a modernized bottom fishing trawl.

=== Holding Structure ===
As of 2019, the holding consists of 16 fishing companies and a number of infrastructure units. Its structural units are divided into directions: administration and management, fish harvesting and transporting, processing and infrastructure, and trading. Trading units include Norebo Africa (African market), Norebo Hong Kong and Norebo Europe (markets outside the Eurasian Economic Union (EAEU)), Norebo Asia and Norebo Ru (operating in the EAEU).

=== Metrics ===
According to the company's own information, its present product assortment includes about 100 different types of products from groundfish and pelagic fish and other aquatic biological resources, including: frozen fish products, fish fillets, minced fish (for Vorschmack); caviar, fish liver; squid.

The Russian market remains the largest market for the company, while its products can be found throughout Europe. One of the Norebo's partners is the Danish company Espersen, which is making fish fillet and supplying it to the largest retail chains and restaurants in the European Union, including McDonald's.

In 2018, the volumes of catch of the holding's companies amounted to 600 thousand tons.

== The Conflict ==
The case was settled in June 2021 in the High Court of Justice in London. It was preceded by a number of investigations in Russia mainly related to Tugushev's claims that he owns a part of the today's company.

Vitaly Orlov (ranking No. 90 on Russian Forbes) is a 100% shareholder of the holding (being a nominal holder of a certain part of shares), while two other co-founders of the holding, Alexander Tugushev and Magnus Roth, call in question Orlov's rights to a significant portion of Norebo shares.
