= Jespersen =

Jespersen is a Danish and Norwegian patronymic surname that may refer to:

== People ==
- Anna Jespersen (1895–1989), American geologist
- Chris Jespersen (born 1983), Norwegian cross-country skier
- Eric Jespersen (born 1961), Canadian sailor
- Finn Varde Jespersen (1914–1944), Norwegian orienteer
- Helle Jespersen (born 1968), Danish competitive sailor
- Karen Jespersen (born 1947), Danish politician
- Knud Jespersen (1926–1977), Danish politician
- Knud J. V. Jespersen (1942–2022), Danish historian and academic
- Mogens Jespersen (born 1949), Danish soccer player
- Otto Jespersen (1860–1943), Danish linguist
- Otto Jespersen (comedian) (born 1954), Norwegian comedian and satirist
- Per Mathias Jespersen (1888–1964), Norwegian gymnast
- Ralph Jespersen (1925–2016), Canadian dairyman and politician

== Other ==
- Murders of Louisa Vesterager Jespersen and Maren Ueland, a 2018 crime that occurred in Morocco
- Jespersen's cycle, process of grammaticalization named in recognition of Otto Jespersen's pioneering work

== See also ==
- Jesperson
- Jespersen v. Harrah's
