= Jarl Jakobsson =

Finnish javelin thrower

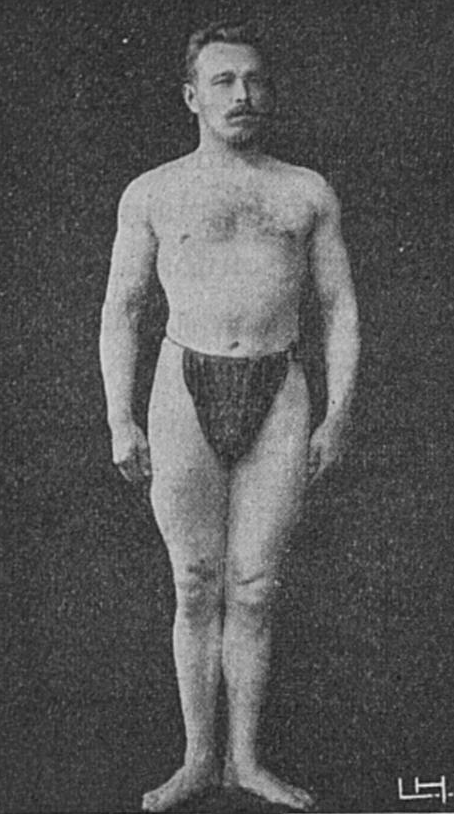
- Jarl Jakobsson circa 1904

Personal information
- Full name: Jarl Gustaf Anian Jakobsson
- National team: Finland
- Born: 11 May 1880 Helsinki, Grand Duchy of Finland, Russian Empire
- Died: 28 December 1951 (aged 71) Helsinki, Finland
- Education: Gym teacher, University of Helsinki, 1904
- Spouse: Karin Adolfina Leontjeff

Sport
- Sport: Track and field
- Event: Javelin throw
- Club: Helsingin Reipas

Jarl Gustaf Anian Jakobsson (11 May 1880 – 28 December 1951) was a Finnish track and field athlete who competed in the 1908 Summer Olympics.

== Athletics ==
Jarl Jakobsson, with his brother Evert, emerged as javelin specialists in the summer of 1906. Their success was based on an alteration on the grip of the javelin. They had stapled two bits of stiff cord on it, improving its support for fingers. The existing world record for two handed javelin throw by Eric Lemming was 91.28 metres, but with their enhancement, Jarl broke it with 91.41 metres. It was then improved by Evert to 98.47, followed by Lemming imitating their grip and taking back the record with 104.40 metres. At this point, the new grip was banned, and all results achieved with it were disqualified, reverting the world record to 91.28.

He entered four events in the Olympic Games:

Jarl Jakobsson at the Olympic Games
| Year | Event | Rank | Result | Notes |
|---|---|---|---|---|
| 1908 | Javelin throw | 8–16 | unknown | Source: His result wasn't officially recorded, but a newspaper correspondent reported that his throws were less than 40 metres. |
| 1908 | Freestyle javelin throw | 10–33 | unknown | Source: |
| 1908 | Standing long jump | 8–25 | unknown | Source: Two Finnish newspaper correspondents reported his result as 310, which would place him 8th. |
| 1908 | Shot put | Did not start | | Source: |

== Personal ==
His father was Gustav Jakobsson, and his mother was Josefina Ulrika Sjöberg. He married Karin Adolfina Leontjeff in 1906. They had daughters Karin Margareta, born in 1907, and Birgit in 1917.

His brother Evert was another Finnish 1908 Olympian. Figure skater Walter Jakobsson, who won Olympic gold in 1920 pair skating, was his cousin.

He graduated as a gym teacher in 1904.
