= Steinkjer (disambiguation) =

Steinkjer may refer to:

== Places ==
- Steinkjer Municipality, a municipality in Trøndelag county, Norway
- Steinkjer (town), a town within Steinkjer Municipality in Trøndelag county, Norway
- Steinkjer Church, a church in Steinkjer Municipality in Trøndelag county, Norway
- Steinkjer Station, a railway station in Steinkjer Municipality in Trøndelag county, Norway

== Other ==
- Steinkjer FK, a football club in the town of Steinkjer, Norway
- Steinkjer SK, a skiing club in the town of Steinkjer, Norway
- Steinkjer TF, a gymnastics club in the town of Steinkjer, Norway
- Steinkjer-Avisa, a newspaper in the town of Steinkjer, Norway
