= Norebo conflict =

Tugushev v Orlov
- Court: High Court of Justice

Case history
- Appealed from: Alexander Tugushev
- Appealed to: Vitaly Orlov

The Norebo conflict is a court case ongoing since 2018 in the High Court of Justice in London about a shareholding in Russian fishing holding company Norebo, one of the biggest Russian fishing enterprises. The dispute is related to amount of shares in parts of the holding possessed by former business partners Vitaly Orlov, Magnus Roth and Alexander Tugushev.

== Premises: 1990s–2010s ==
=== Forming of Karat/Norebo ===
In the mid 1990s Orlov and Tugushev met as students at Murmansk High Marine School. Orlov, upon graduation, moved to Norway to work at Scandsea Int. A/S, a Norwegian trading company which was buying fish from Russian fishing companies based in Murmansk. At that company, Orlov joined efforts with Swedish entrepreneur Magnus Roth. In 1997 they created a new company with 50/50 shareholding, Ocean Trawlers A/S. Aside from buying fish, the company offered Norwegian trawlers for rent on the terms of bareboat charter. This was crucial for the post-Soviet fishing industry, as Russian fishing companies at that time owned only outdated Soviet vessels.

One of fish sellers for Orlov and Roth was Alexander Tugushev. While Orlov was working in Norway, Tugushev utilized several old Soviet vessels to make his own fishing company in Russia. By 1998 Tugushev joined Ocean Trawlers as a partner and they began to form the holding company called Karat Group. The name Karat Fishing Holding was used for the holding of 16 companies, and the name Norebo was taken in 2016.

In early 2000s Orlov and Roth were enlarging their business and forming a holding company later known as Karat Fishing Holding and subsequently as Norebo (by 2019 the holding contained 16 companies, see article Norebo). One of the companies that participated in the creation of the holding was called Almor Atlantica. It was founded in 2001 by Orlov and Roth, and by that time they accepted Tugushev as a co-shareholder and granted 25% of company shares to him.

Orlov claims that Tugushev later, by 2003, disposed of his shares to become a high-ranked Russian official — the deputy head of a Russian governmental committee called Goskomrybolovstvo (Госкомрыболовство) — the State Committee of the Russian Federation for Fishing. Tugushev’s position included authority to allot fishing quotas that belonged to the Russian Federation. According to Russian law, no shareholding in commercial entities is allowed for such officials. Because of that, Tugushev's shares were relocated to holding's top manager Andrey Petrik.

=== Arrest and release of Tugushev ===
In July 2003, the significant reform of the fishing quota system in Russia started to eliminate the authority of Goskomrybolovstvo to allot fishing quotas. The reform followed a series of corruption scandals and murders of governors. The head of Goskomrybolovstvo Aleksandr Moyseev invited Tugushev to join the committee to help in reforming the quotas system. In September 2003, Tugushev was appointed as the deputy head of Moyseev by order of then-prime minister Mikhail Kasyanov.

Russian court found later, he managed to receive a bribe for a quota from a Far-Eastern fishing company called Polluks. That company, to pay the bribe, used funds borrowed from their partners in South Korea. After not receiving any quotas (without them, their business was impossible), Polluks applied to Russian law enforcement. This led to the arrest of Tugushev on June 2, 2004 (while about 150 policemen were involved in operations at 15 locations). Tugushev was charged with the bribe of $3.7 million received from Polluks. Simultaneously, Polluks started a civil lawsuit against Tugushev to compensate the loss of 3.7 million US dollars.

In February 2007, Russian court found Tugushev guilty and sentenced him to 6 years in prison. In 2009 Tugushev was released from prison on parole and returned to working at Norebo.

Several years later, Tugushev signed a settlement agreement with Polluks' owner Sergei Alexandrov in respect of their civil claim.

Before Tugushev's move to London in 2018, he was arrested in absentia by Oktyabrsky District Court of Murmansk and put by the Ministry of Internal Affairs of Russia on the international wanted list because of accusations of obtaining more than 40 million roubles (about USD 540 000) from a big Murmansk fishery supplier OOO (LLC) Vostok and its co-founder Alexander Sychev.

=== Conflict between Tugushev and Orlov ===
After re-starting to work at Karat/Norebo as assistant to Orlov, Tugushev began to claim a part of the whole business which has been constantly growing in worldwide scale (Norebo's fish is nowadays particularly used by McDonald's). This led to his conflict with Orlov as Orlov made allegations of extortion and telephone threats. Tugushev filed a criminal complaint accusing Orlov of fraud. The first proceedings were commenced on 24 November 2015 at Koptevskiy court in Moscow apparently by Tugushev (but he denies). Tugushev says that this was sham litigation instigated by Orlov to obstruct and destroy claims of Tugushev. In 2015, a similar situation was staged in the Loukhi District Court of the Republic of Karelia.

In 2016, Orlov complained to the police about receiving the threatening telephone calls from someone possibly acting on behalf of Tugushev. Later the one who called Orlov was identified as Mr Dzhamaldaev. The police put Tugushev under house arrest the same year, however Tugushev denied any links to Dzhamaldaev. In December 2017, the investigation was closed with Tugushev found not linked with the Dzhamaldaev.

In 2016, Tugushev also made criminal complaints against Orlov in Russia accusing him of fraud which resulted in criminal proceedings commenced on 25 July 2018. Both complaints were based on the allegation that Orlov had unlawfully obtained Tugushev’s stake in Norebo. As part of these proceedings, Norebo office and the related persons were subjected to several police raids between 26 and 28 September 2018, in which large quantities of documents were collected. Tugushev also convicted Orlov in falsification of documents submitted to the Murmansk court.

At the same time, the media reported on Tugushev’s filing of crime complaints in connection with forgery by Orlov of the evidence and Tugushev’s signatures on the share purchase agreements signed in 2000.

=== Selling shares of Magnus Roth ===
In 2016 a series of bargains between the holding's shareholders and related companies occurred that lead to full relocation of the shares worth $201 million of the co-owner Magnus Roth to the possession of Vitaly Orlov. This resulted in concentration of 100% of Norebo shares, ranking Orlov No. 90 on Russian Forbes list of richest people. As mass media report, Roth is supposed to be involved in series of tax evasions in Russia and Norway while nominally living in Hong Kong and factually living in Switzerland (but making business in Norway and Russia).

== London and related court proceedings (since 2018) ==
In 2018 Tugushev relocated from Russia to the UK where filed a claim against Orlov and Roth over third-part of Norebo (as Almor Atlanica's successor) to High Court of Justice.

His ability to legally move to London is questioned because of his 6-year prison term and other criminal cases that would normally prevent him from receiving a British entry visa. The Guardian reports this was apparently made possible due to paid British lawyers who managed to prove to the UK Visas and Immigration office that his arrest was politically motivated. Tugushev settled in the center of London in a luxury apartment.

In July 2018 the High Court of Justice arrested Orlov's assets in the UK worth $350 million and lifted the asset freeze year later, in July 2019 "after the discovery of new documents alleging that Tugushev gave up his share in" Almor Atlantica (according to Forbes).

In 2019 the High Court of England & Wales confirmed that it has jurisdiction to hear the case between Tugushev and Orlov.

In May 2019, Orlov submitted a claim to Murmansk Court objecting against jurisdiction of English court in dispute with Tugushev, however in January 2020, Murmansk court dismissed the claim.

In early 2020, Magnus Roth supported the position of Tugushev and accepted that Tugushev is legally entitled to 33% of all Norebo assets. This is despite the fact that initially Magnus Roth was considered a co-defendant as a former Norebo co-owner which share Tugushev claimed.

In early 2021, Norebo representatives filed a complaint to Arbitration court of Moscow against Tugushev and his company called "Raduga". They demand a compensation of 1.19 billion roubles for damage in business and reputation caused by Tugushev's Russian court claims of Almor Atlantica shares in 2018.

The case was settled in June 2021.

== Versions ==
Tugushev v. Orlov case is thought to continue a series of disputes in the High Court of Justice between the Russian businessmen for a business jointly established by them in the 1990s. Such disputes also include, for example, the proceedings between B. Berezovsky and R. Abramovich, M. Cherny and O. Deripaska, V. Chernukhin and O. Deripaska, brothers Ruben and O. Deripaska.

In early 2020 it was disclosed by The Guardian, that Tugushev's London court campaign was reportedly financed and juridically organized by an English firm called 17Arm. The company is related to UK's ex-foreign secretary Malcolm Rifkind, politician Ken Macdonald "and other establishment figures". As The Guardian reports, "the case throws a spotlight on a relatively novel and risky area of legal practice known as litigation funding". The firm may have helped Tugushev to get British visa on political grounds despite his 6-year Russian conviction which normally would prevent an individual to get such visa. The Guardian also cites the judge Sue Carr who described the whole London case "as a 'bitter battle' between two Russians that had generated a 'depressingly vast amount' of legal paperwork".

Russian Novye Izvestia newspaper suggests that there may be about "three layers" of groups of people supporting and financing Tugushev through 17Arm and some offshore structures. These may include Norebo's commercial rivals and high-profile Russian criminals trying to get their hands on parts of Norebo. Officially Tugushev refuses to name his sponsors to the court and to disclose the origins of his funds. In the Novye Izvestia article, available in English language, large number of persons is listed that may be interested of supporting Tugushev directly and indirectly. Them include major businessmen, criminal figures and law enforcement functioners.

== See also ==
- Berezovsky v Abramovich
- Burlakov case
