= Louis Bruce =

British wrestler

Personal information
- Nationality: British
- Born: 17 December 1875 Edinburgh
- Died: 31 March 1958 (aged 82)

Sport
- Sport: Wrestling

Louis Bruce (17 December 1875 – 31 March 1958) was a British wrestler and one of the first Black London tram drivers. He competed in the men's freestyle heavyweight at the 1908 Summer Olympics, the first Black British Olympian.

== Early life ==
Bruce was born Louis Bruce McAvoy Mortimore Doney, in Paradise Cottage in Morningside, Edinburgh in 1875, to widow Jane Elizabeth Doney (née Mortimore). He had six older sisters. His father was not named on his birth certificate. Bruce grew up in Frogmore Cottage, Plympton, Devon with his grandmother and two aunts.

== 1908 Olympics ==
Bruce was a member of a number of London wrestling clubs, including the Hammersmith Amateur Wrestling Club. He was a competitor in the London Summer Olympic Games of 1908, the oldest participant in the wrestling event age 32. Bruce reached the Quarter Finals, wrestling against Alfred Banbrook and winning, then losing to Ernest Nixson in the next round. Bruce finished fifth in the heavyweight category. According to The Guardian, Bruce's listed address on 1908 Olympic wrestling documents was on Princes Road in Teddington, however, a plaque has been placed at 7 St Peter’s Grove in Hammersmith stating the address was his home during the 1908 Olympics.

Prior to research undertaken in December 2021, he was recorded under the name "Lawrence Bruce". His name was correctly identified as Louis Bruce, and that he was the first Black Olympian to represent Great Britain (it was previously believed that sprinter Harry Edward, who competed in 1920, was the first Black Olympian to represent Britain).

== Tram career ==
Bruce also appears on the London Underground map of Black history produced by the London Transport Museum. Bruce was one of London's first Black tram drivers and was selected to drive tram No.320, the personal tram of London United Tramways (LUT) manager Clifton Robinson. He got his licence to drive trams in 1900 and appears to have driven until at least 1922. He achieved the relatively senior rank of Inspector. During his time with LUT, Bruce boxed in company matches and performed in company entertainments as a dancer, ragtime singer and comedian.

== Personal life ==
Bruce married Ethel Elizabeth Dunn in September 1911. Bruce listed his father as a medical practitioner named William King Bruce on his wedding certificate. Ethel and Louis Bruce had a son named Dennis. By the 1930s, Bruce had moved to Sutton and owned a shop. Bruce died in 1958 with an estate valued at £5,897.

== Commemoration ==
A blue plaque was unveiled in Louis Bruce's honour at his former home at 7 St Peter’s Grove, Hammersmith, London on 25 April 2023.
