= Evert Jakobsson =

Finnish javelin thrower

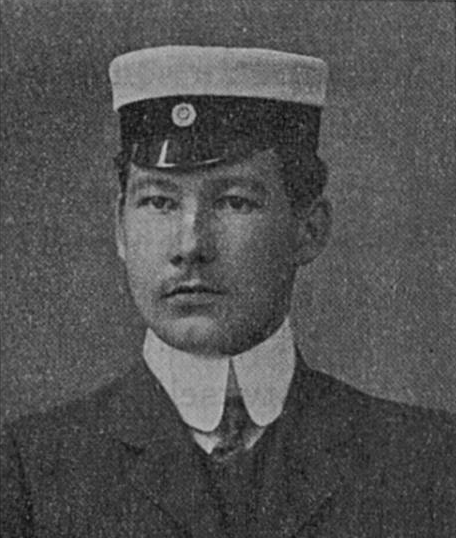

Personal information
- Full name: Evert Brynolf Jakobsson
- National team: Finland
- Born: February 16, 1886 Helsinki, Grand Duchy of Finland, Russian Empire
- Died: July 16, 1960 (aged 74) Helsinki, Finland
- Occupations: Varatuomari, insurance manager, chief executive officer
- Height: 184 cm (6 ft 0 in)
- Weight: 74 kg (163 lb)
- Spouse: Elsa Alma Elisabeth Savander
- Other interests: Volunteer fire department

Sport
- Sport: Track and field
- Event: Javelin throw
- Club: Helsingin Reipas

Evert Brynolf Jakobsson (16 February 1886 – 16 July 1960) was a Finnish javelin thrower who competed at the 1908 Summer Olympics.

== Athletics ==
Evert Jakobsson, with his brother Jarl, emerged as javelin specialists in the summer of 1906. Their success was based on an alteration on the grip of the javelin. They had stapled two bits of stiff cord on it, improving its support for fingers. The existing world record by Eric Lemming was 53.90 metres, but with their enhancement, Evert broke it with 57.42. He travelled to Stockholm in September 1906 to challenge Lemming. Although Lemming was victorious, he duplicated their grip and took back the record with 58.37 metres. At this point, the new grip was banned, and all results achieved with it were disqualified, reverting the world record to 53.90.

Evert Jakobsson at the Olympic Games
Games	Event	Rank	Result	Notes
1908	Javelin throw	8–16	unknown	Source: His result wasn't officially recorded, but a newspaper correspondent reported that his throws were less than 40 metres.
1908	Freestyle javelin throw	10–33	unknown	Source:
1908	Shot put	Did not start		Source:

== Other ==
His parents were master builder Gustaf Jakobsson and Josefina Torck. He married Elsa Alma Elisabet Savander (born 1894) in 1916. They had three children:

1. Jack Witikka, born 1916, film director
2. Inga Elsa, 1918
3. Kerstin, 1920

His brother Jarl was another 1908 Olympian. Figure skater Walter Jakobsson, who won Olympic gold in 1920 pair skating, was his cousin.

He was in the municipal council of Haaga in 1914–1930.

He held the rank vääpeli in the White Guard.

He received the following medals:

- Commemorative medal of the Liberation War
- Medal of Liberty, 1st Class
- Civil Guard Medal of Merit
- Commemorative Medal of the Winter War
- First Class Knight of the White Rose of Finland
- Cross of Merit of the Fire Defence
