= Oslo IL =

Norwegian sports club

- Full name: Oslo Idrettslag
- Founded: 3 September 1893
- Ground: Frogner stadion, Oslo (skating); Bislett stadion, Oslo (athletics)

Oslo Idrettslag is a Norwegian multi-sports club from Oslo, with sections for swimming, speed skating, figure skating and athletics.

== History ==
It was founded on 3 September 1893 as Kristiania Idrætsforening, partly on the ruins of the clubs Dovre, Kristiania SF and SF Ørnen. The main sports were athletics, speed skating and Nordic skiing. Its first sports field was at Klosterengen in Gamle Oslo, later a speed skating track at Frognerjordet. In 1907 a field at Bislett was secured for the future Bislett stadion, by the club's foremost administrator Martinus Lørdahl. The club changed its name to Oslo Idrettslag after the city Kristiania in 1924 changed its name to Oslo.

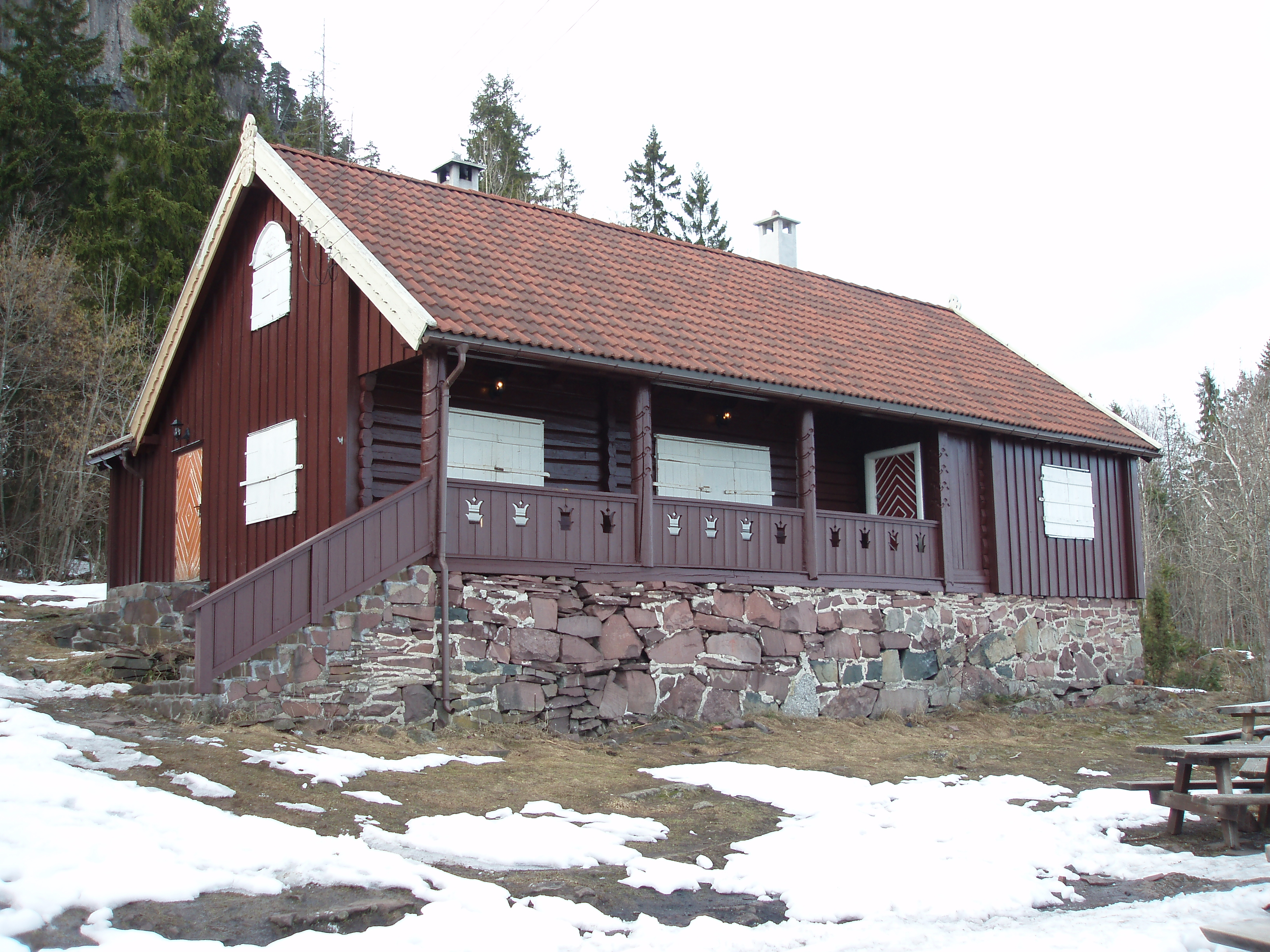
KIF-hytta.

The club acquired a sports cabin at Kolsåstoppen in Bærum in 1916. The cabin had formerly been displayed at the 1914 Jubilee Exhibition, as a contribution from the Norwegian Trekking Association. The cabin is still named KIF-hytta despite the name change from Kristiania IF.

== Athletics ==
The club had some of the winningest athletes in Norway, mainly before the Second World War. By 1933, the men from Kristiania IF/Oslo IL had won 134 Norwegian championship titles as well as 13 in relay. The winningest athlete on the domestic level was Kaare Bache with eleven championships. He was a 1920 Olympian. Ferdinand Bie was a 1912 Olympic champion in pentathlon. Edvard Larsen won an Olympic bronze in 1908 and competed in 1912.

Other Olympians in the club include Otto Haug (1906), Henry Olsen (1908), Nils Dahl (1908 and 1912), Oscar Larsen (1908 and 1912), Birger Brodtkorb (1912), Daniel Johansen (1912), Herman Sotaaen (1912), Bjarne Guldager (1920), Einar Ræder (1920), Einar Mangset (1920), and Einar Tommelstad (1928). Otto Monsen took one national title for Kristiania IF, but did not represent the club in the Olympics. Other national champions include John Falchenberg (3 for Kristiania IF) and Sigurd Roll (1 title).

== Speed skating ==
Well-known speed skaters include Aage Johansen, Odd Lundberg, Alv Gjestvang, Per Bjørang, Per Ivar Moe, Lisbeth Korsmo, Roald Aas (Olympic gold medallist in 1960, also competed in 1952 and 1956), Jørn Didriksen (Olympic silver in 1976), Gunnar Konsmo (1948 Olympian), Hroar Elvenes (Olympian in 1952, 1956, 1960 and 1964), Sigmund Søfteland (Olympian in 1952 and 1956), Jan Kristiansen (1956 Olympian), Kirsti Biermann (1968 and 1972 Olympian) and Ole Christian Iversen (1972 Olympian).

== Figure skating ==
Olympic figure skaters include Andreas Krogh (1920), Margot Moe (1920), Nanna Egedius (1936), Marit Henie (1948), Berit Unn Johansen (1964).

== Swimming ==
Swimmers from Oslo IL have won about 1000 Norwegian titles. Well-known swimmers include Ulf Gustavsen, Rolf Bagle, Lars Krogh, Inger Nordbø, Beda Leirvåg and Trine Krogh. Pre-war Olympians are John Johnsen (1912), Herbert Wetter (1912), Knut Olsen (1928) and Per Olsen (1952).

== Defunct sports ==
The club fielded a men's handball team, which won the Norwegian outdoor championships in 1956, 1957 and 1958.
