= Wrestling at the 1908 Summer Olympics – Men's freestyle heavyweight =

Men's heavyweight freestyle wrestling at the Games of the IV Olympiad
- Venue: White City Stadium
- Date: July 23, 1908
- Competitors: 11 from 3 nations

Medalists
1st place, gold medalist(s)		Con O'Kelly	Great Britain
2nd place, silver medalist(s)		Jacob Gundersen	Norway
3rd place, bronze medalist(s)		Edward Barrett	Great Britain

The freestyle heavyweight was one of five freestyle wrestling weight classes contested on the Wrestling at the 1908 Summer Olympics programme. Like all other wrestling events, it was open only to men. The heavyweight was the heaviest weight class, allowing wrestlers over 73 kilograms (161 lb). Eleven wrestlers competed; nine from Great Britain, one from Norway, and one from the United States. The competition was held on July 23, 1908. Each nation could enter up to 12 wrestlers.

== Competition format ==
The event was a single-elimination tournament with a bronze medal match between the semifinal losers. The final and bronze medal match were best two-of-three, while all other rounds were a single bout. Bouts were 15 minutes, unless one wrestler lost by fall (two shoulders on the ground at the same time). Other than falls, decisions were made by the judges or, if they did not agree, the referee.

Wrestlers could "take hold how and where they please[d]" except that "hair, flesh, ears, private parts, or clothes may not be seized"; striking, scratching, twisting fingers, butting, and kicking were prohibited. Holds "obtained that the fear of breakage or dislocation of a limb shall induce a wrestler to give the fall" were outlawed, and particularly the double-nelson, hammerlock, strangle, half-strangle, scissors, hang, flying mare with palm uppermost, and the foot twist.

== Results ==
=== Bracket ===
First Round
Fall (3:25)
Louis Bruce (GBR)
Alfred Banbrook (GBR)
Fall (6:20)
Jacob Gundersen (NOR)
Walter West (GBR)
Fall (1:20)
Con O'Kelly (GBR)
Lee Talbott (USA)

Quarter-finals
Fall (3:50)
Louis Bruce (GBR)
Ernest Nixson (GBR)
Decision
Jacob Gundersen (NOR)
Frederick Humphreys (GBR)
Fall (4:05)
Con O'Kelly (GBR)
Henry Foskett (GBR)
Fall (3:20)
Edward Barrett (GBR)
Cyril Brown (GBR)

Semi-finals
Fall (9:37)
Ernest Nixson (GBR)
Jacob Gundersen (NOR)
Fall (2:14)
Con O'Kelly (GBR)
Edward Barrett (GBR)

Final
2–0 (falls 13:27/3:35)
Jacob Gundersen (NOR) (silver)
Con O'Kelly (GBR) (gold)
Third place
2–0 (falls 3:04/4:52)
Edward Barrett (GBR) (bronze)
Ernest Nixson (GBR)

=== Standings ===
Place	Wrestler	Nation
1	Con O'Kelly	Great Britain
2	Jacob Gundersen	Norway
3	Edward Barrett	Great Britain
4	Ernest Nixson	Great Britain
5	Louis Bruce	Great Britain
5	Frederick Humphreys	Great Britain
5	Henry Foskett	Great Britain
5	Cyril Brown	Great Britain
9	Alfred Banbrook	Great Britain
9	Lee Talbott	United States
9	William West	Great Britain

== Sources ==
- Cook, Theodore Andrea (1908). The Fourth Olympiad, Being the Official Report. London: British Olympic Association.
- De Wael, Herman (2001). "Freestyle Wrestling 1908". Herman's Full Olympians.
