= Athletics at the 1912 Summer Olympics – Men's two handed javelin throw =

Men's two handed javelin throw at the Games of the V Olympiad
- Venue: Stockholm Olympic Stadium
- Date: July 9, 1912
- Competitors: 14 from 4 nations

Medalists
1st place, gold medalist(s)		Julius Saaristo	Finland
2nd place, silver medalist(s)		Väinö Siikaniemi	Finland
3rd place, bronze medalist(s)		Urho Peltonen	Finland

The men's two handed javelin throw was a track and field athletics event held as part of the Athletics at the 1912 Summer Olympics programme. It was the only appearance of the event at the Olympics, along with the other two handed throws. The format of the event was such that each thrower threw the javelin three times with his right hand and three times with his left hand. The best distance with each hand was summed to give a total. The three finalists received three more throws with each hand. NOCs could enter up to 12 athletes.

== Results ==
Saaristo, who had taken the silver medal in the one-handed event, won the two-handed event, leading a Finnish medal sweep.

The three Finnish throwers qualified for the final, but being assured of medals, they mutually agreed to scratch the final and let the results stand: Olympic officials accepted their request.

Place	Athlete	Preliminary					Final			Best mark total
Place	Athlete	1	2	3	Total	Rank	4	5	6	Best mark total
	Julius Saaristo (FIN)	57.64	59.88	61.00	109.42	1st	Not held			109.42
	Julius Saaristo (FIN)	—	—	48.42	109.42	1st	Not held			109.42
	Väinö Siikaniemi (FIN)	54.09	—	—	101.13	2nd	Not held			101.13
	Väinö Siikaniemi (FIN)	43.76	45.09	47.04	101.13	2nd	Not held			101.13
	Urho Peltonen (FIN)	—	53.22	53.58	100.24	3rd	Not held			100.24
	Urho Peltonen (FIN)	46.30	46.63	46.66	100.24	3rd	Not held			100.24
4	Eric Lemming (SWE)	52.23	58.33	—	98.59	4th				98.59
4	Eric Lemming (SWE)	35.78	40.26	—	98.59	4th				98.59
5	Arne Halse (NOR)	52.05	55.05	—	96.92	5th				96.92
5	Arne Halse (NOR)	41.48	—	41.87	96.92	5th				96.92
6	Richard Åbrink (SWE)	48.78	50.04	—	93.12	6th				93.12
6	Richard Åbrink (SWE)	41.71	43.08	—	93.12	6th				93.12
7	Daniel Johansen (NOR)	48.38	—	48.78	92.82	7th				92.82
7	Daniel Johansen (NOR)	40.99	43.19	44.04	92.82	7th				92.82
8	Otto Nilsson (SWE)	48.24	50.21	—	88.90	8th				88.90
8	Otto Nilsson (SWE)	38.69	—	—	88.90	8th				88.90
9	Juho Halme (FIN)	—	52.76	54.90	88.54	9th				88.54
9	Juho Halme (FIN)	33.64	—	—	88.54	9th				88.54
10	Arvid Ohrling (SWE)	46.51	—	—	87.17	10th				87.17
10	Arvid Ohrling (SWE)	40.66	—	—	87.17	10th				87.17
11	Sten Hagander (SWE)	42.58	46.39	—	86.80	11th				86.80
11	Sten Hagander (SWE)	37.68	40.41	—	86.80	11th				86.80
12	Mór Kóczán (HUN)	55.74	—	—	86.39	12th				66.69
12	Mór Kóczán (HUN)	29.23	30.65	—	86.39	12th				66.69
13	Anders Krigsman (SWE)	43.78	46.85	—	85.80	13th				85.80
13	Anders Krigsman (SWE)	36.09	38.95	—	85.80	13th				85.80
14	Karl Sonne (SWE)	—	49.48	—	84.96	14th				84.96
14	Karl Sonne (SWE)	33.52	36.00	36.48	84.96	14th				84.96

== Sources ==
- Bergvall, Erik, ed. (1913). The Official Report of the Olympic Games of Stockholm 1912. Translated by Adams-Ray, Edward. Stockholm: Wahlström & Widstrand.
- Wudarski, Pawel (1999). "Wyniki Igrzysk Olimpijskich" (in Polish).
