= Athletics at the 1912 Summer Olympics – Men's javelin throw =

Men's javelin throw at the Games of the V Olympiad
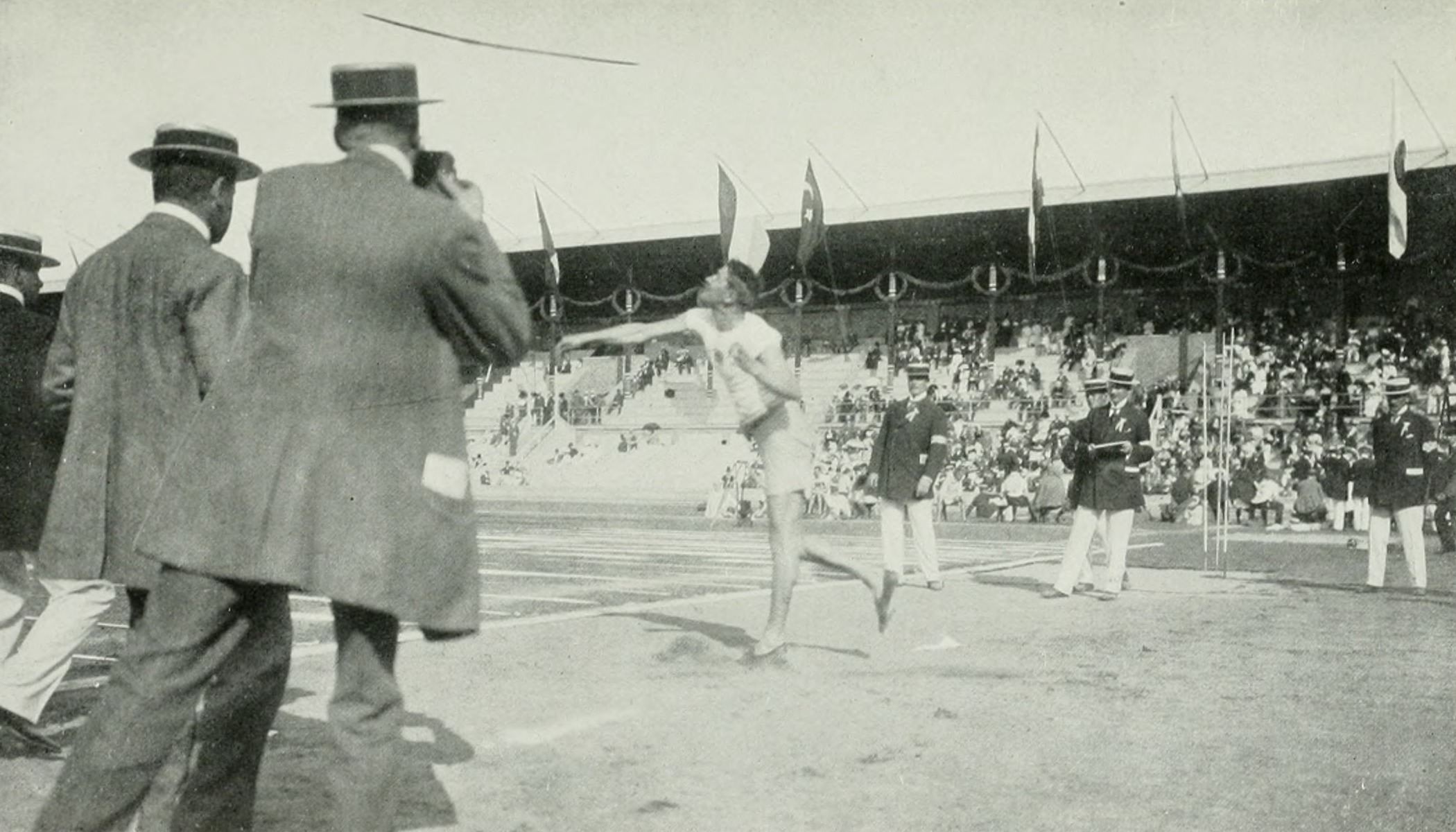
- Lemming on the way to win the gold medal.
- Venue: Stockholm Olympic Stadium
- Date: July 6, 1912
- Competitors: 25 from 7 nations

Medalists
1st place, gold medalist(s)		Eric Lemming	Sweden
2nd place, silver medalist(s)		Julius Saaristo	Finland
3rd place, bronze medalist(s)		Mór Kóczán	Hungary

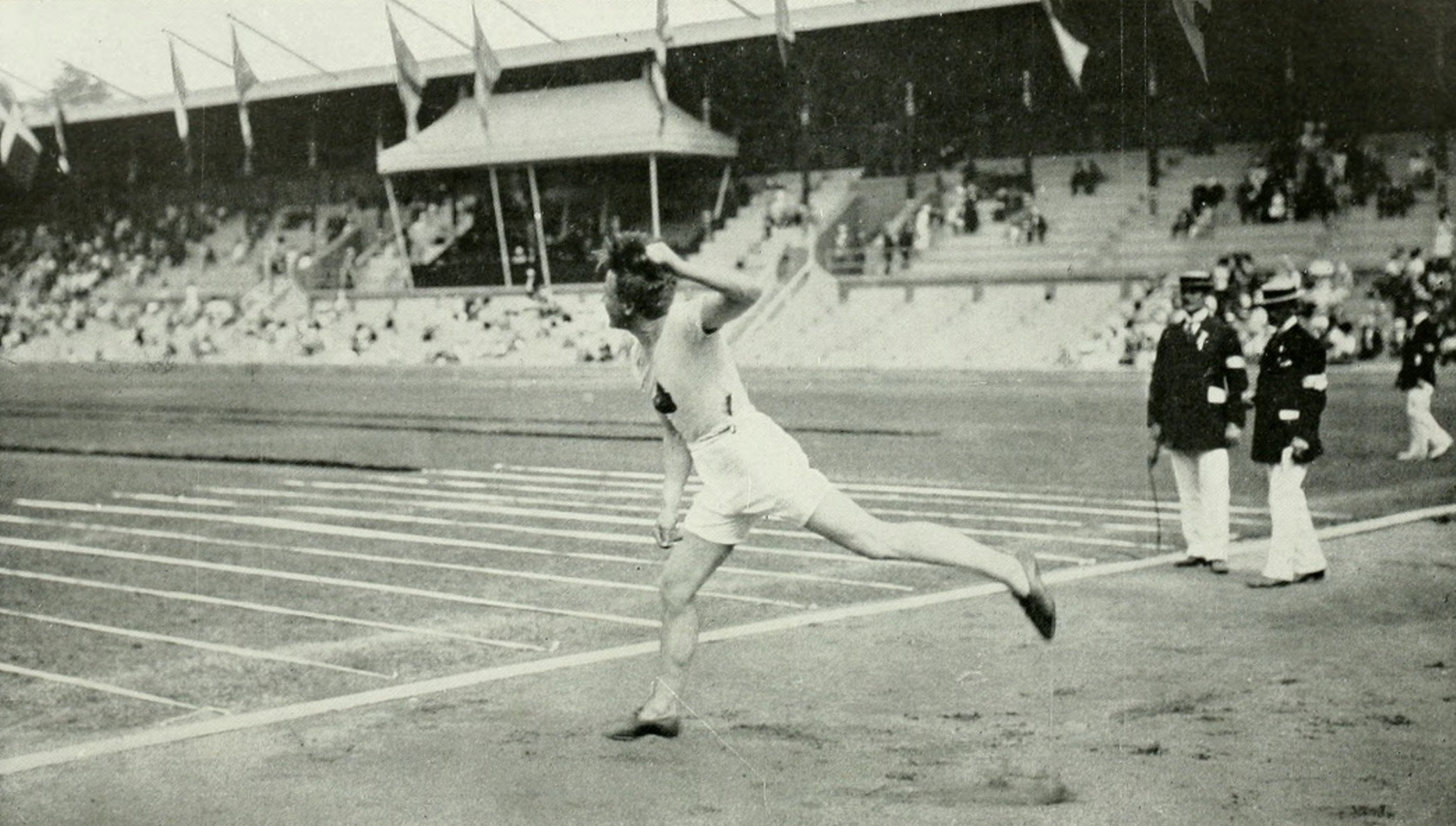
Silver medalist Julius Saaristo.

The men's javelin throw was a track and field athletics event held as part of the athletics at the 1912 Summer Olympics programme. It was the second appearance of the event, but in 1908 it was a standing throw with no run up. The competition was held on Saturday, July 6, 1912. Twenty-five javelin throwers from seven nations competed. NOCs could enter up to 12 athletes.

== Records ==
These were the standing world and Olympic records (in metres) prior to the 1912 Summer Olympics.

World record	61.45(*)	(Finland) Julius Saaristo	Helsinki (FIN)	May 25, 1912
Olympic record	54.83	(Sweden) Eric Lemming	London (GBR)	July 17, 1908

(*) unofficial

Julius Saaristo set at first a new Olympic record with 55.37 m. Eric Lemming improved the record to 57.42 m and finally to 60.64 m. Three days later on July 9, 1912 Julius Saaristo set a new Olympic record in the two handed javelin throw competition with 61.00 m.

== Results ==
Saaristo took the lead after the first throw, and made an even better second throw to stay ahead of Lemming. On the third throw, however, Saaristo scratched and Lemming threw his javelin well over 57 metres to take the lead going into the finals, with Kóczán wresting third place from Halme on the final throw to advance as well. While each of the three finalists made improvements in their marks in the final round, no changes in order were made and Lemming's 60.64 metres stood as the new record.

Place	Athlete	Preliminary				Final			Best mark
Place	Athlete	1	2	3	Rank	4	5	6	Best mark
1	Eric Lemming (SWE)	53.02	54.78	57.42 OR	1st	60.64 OR	—	59.00	60.64
2	Julius Saaristo (FIN)	54.75	55.37 OR	—	2nd	56.21	—	58.66	58.66
3	Mór Kóczán (HUN)	54.06	—	54.99	3rd	—	—	55.50	55.50
4	Johan Halme (FIN)	53.81	54.65	—	4th				54.65
5	Väinö Siikaniemi (FIN)	52.19	—	52.43	5th				52.43
6	Richard Åbrink (SWE)	46.56	48.25	52.20	6th				52.20
7	Arne Halse (NOR)	51.98	—	—	7th				51.98
8	Jonni Myyrä (FIN)	48.77	51.33	—	8th				51.33
9	Urho Peltonen (FIN)	49.20	—	—	9th				49.20
10	Otto Nilsson (SWE)	47.59	48.01	49.18	10th				49.18
11	Karl Sonne (SWE)	—	47.85	—	11th				47.85
12	Daniel Johansen (NOR)	46.18	46.87	47.61	12th				47.61
13	Svante Olsson (SWE)	46.94	—	—	13th				46.94
14	Anders Krigsman (SWE)	45.14	45.48	46.71	14th				46.71
15	Janne Dahl (SWE)	—	44.09	45.67	15th				45.67
16	Arvid Ohrling (SWE)	45.00	45.32	—	16th				45.32
17	Nikolay Neklapaev (RUS)	—	44.78	44.98	17th				44.98
18	Emil Kukko (FIN)	44.50	—	44.66	18th				44.66
19	Josef Waitzer (GER)	41.99	43.20	43.71	19th				43.71
20	Nikolajs Švedrēvics (RUS)	—	43.21	—	20th				43.21
21	Algot Larsson (SWE)	43.18	—	—	21st				43.18
22	Karl Halt (GER)	—	41.99	—	22nd				41.99
23	Paul Willführ (GER)	41.05	—	—	23rd				41.05
24	Eskil Falk (SWE)	—	—	—	24th				None
24	Gustav Krojer (AUT)	—	—	—	24th				None

== Sources ==
- Bergvall, Erik, ed. (1913). The Official Report of the Olympic Games of Stockholm 1912. Translated by Adams-Ray, Edward. Stockholm: Wahlström & Widstrand.
- Wudarski, Pawel (1999). "Wyniki Igrzysk Olimpijskich" (in Polish).
