= Ole Holm =

Norwegian sport shooter (1870–1956)

Personal information
- Born: 28 December 1870 Stange, Norway
- Died: 29 January 1956 (aged 85) Rena, Norway
Medal record
Shooting
Representing Norway
1906 Intercalated Games
Silver medal – second place	1906 Athens	Team free rifle

Ole Holm (28 December 1870 – 29 January 1956) was a Norwegian rifle shooter. He was born in Stange Municipality in Hedemarken county. He won a silver medal in free rifle team at the 1906 Summer Olympics in Athens, together with Gudbrand Skatteboe, Julius Braathe, Albert Helgerud, and John Møller. He won the title Shooting king at Landsskytterstevnet in 1900.
