= Charalambos Zouras =

Greek javelin thrower

Kharalambos Zouras (Greek: Χαράλαμπος Ζούρας, January 1, 1885 – 1972) was a Greek athlete who competed in the 1908 Summer Olympics. He was born in Vourvoura, Arcadia.

In 1908 he finished fourth in the freestyle javelin competition. He also participated in the javelin throw event, but the result is unknown.
