= Sten Hagander =

Swedish javelin thrower

Sten Hagander (November 22, 1891 – April 22, 1981) was a Swedish track and field athlete who competed in the 1912 Summer Olympics. In 1912, he finished eleventh in the two handed javelin throw event.
