= Hilding Sonne =

Swedish javelin thrower

Karl Hilding Sonne (April 8, 1890 – April 20, 1938) was a Swedish track and field athlete who competed in the 1912 Summer Olympics. In 1912, he finished eleventh in the javelin throw competition and 14th in the two handed javelin throw event.
