= Nikolajs Švedrēvics =

Latvian javelin thrower

Nikolajs Švedrēvics (January 18, 1891 – July 7, 1937) was a Latvian track and field athlete who competed for the Russian Empire in the 1912 Summer Olympics, where he finished 20th in the javelin throw competition. He was born in Riga, Russian Empire.
