= Einar Ræder =

Norwegian long jumper

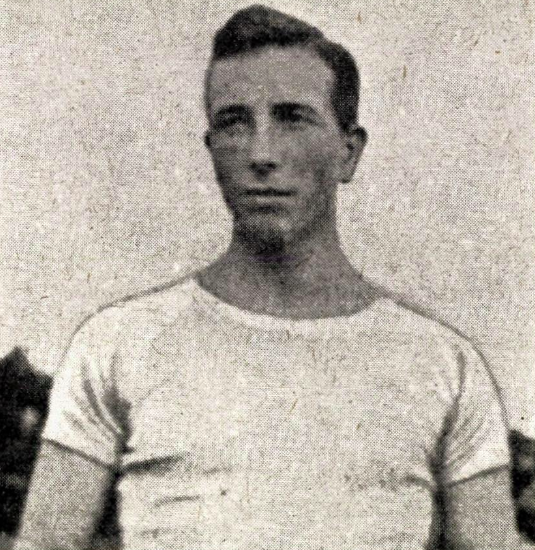
Ræder around 1920

Einar Ræder (2 February 1896 – 10 March 1976) was a Norwegian long jumper. He represented Kristiania IF in Oslo.

Ræder was born in Rindal Municipality in Møre og Romsdal county. At the 1920 Summer Olympics, he finished eighth in the long jump final with a jump of 6.585 metres. He also competed in the decathlon, but did not finish. He never became Norwegian champion in long jump, but won the Norwegian championships in pentathlon in 1920 and 1923 and decathlon in 1922 and 1923.

His personal best jump was 7.07 metres, achieved on 4 September 1920 in Trondheim.

Ræder died in Levanger in Nord-Trøndelag county.
