= Ole Christian Iversen =

Norwegian speed skater

Personal information
- Nationality: Norwegian
- Born: 1 August 1946 (age 78); Lillehammer

Sport
- Sport: Speed skating
- Club: Oslo IL

Ole Christian Iversen (born 1 August 1946) is a Norwegian speed skater. He was born in Lillehammer and represented the club Oslo IL. He competed in the 500 m at the 1972 Winter Olympics in Sapporo.
