= Ferenc Jesina =

Slovak athlete

Ferenc Jesina (Slovak: František Ješina; 19 August 1887 – 27 November 1951) was a Slovak track and field athlete who competed for Hungary in the 1908 Summer Olympics. He was born in Trnava. In 1908 he participated in the discus throw competition as well as in the freestyle javelin throw event but in both competitions his final ranking is unknown.
