= Otto Nilsson =

Swedish athlete

Olympic medal record

Men's athletics

Representing Sweden
Bronze medal – third place	1908 London	Javelin throw

Sven Otto Nilsson (February 26, 1879 – November 10, 1960) was a Swedish athlete who competed in the 1908 Summer Olympics and in the 1912 Summer Olympics.

In 1908, he won the bronze medal in the javelin throw event. He also participated in the freestyle javelin throw competition and in the discus throw event, but in both competitions his final ranking is unknown.

Four years later he finished eighth in the two handed javelin throw event, tenth in the javelin throw competition, and fortieth discus throw event.

== Gallery ==
Otto Nilsson

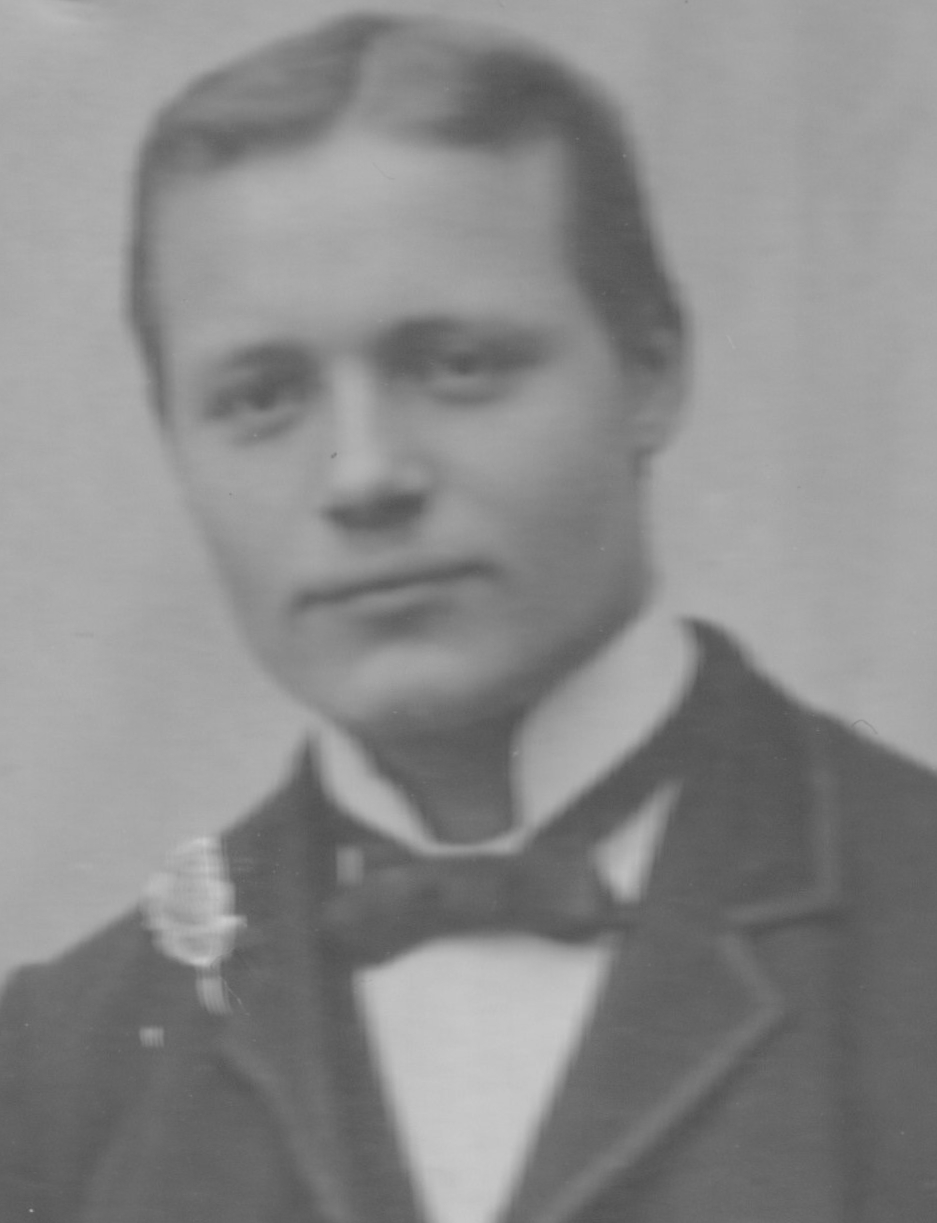
Otto Nilsson around 1900.

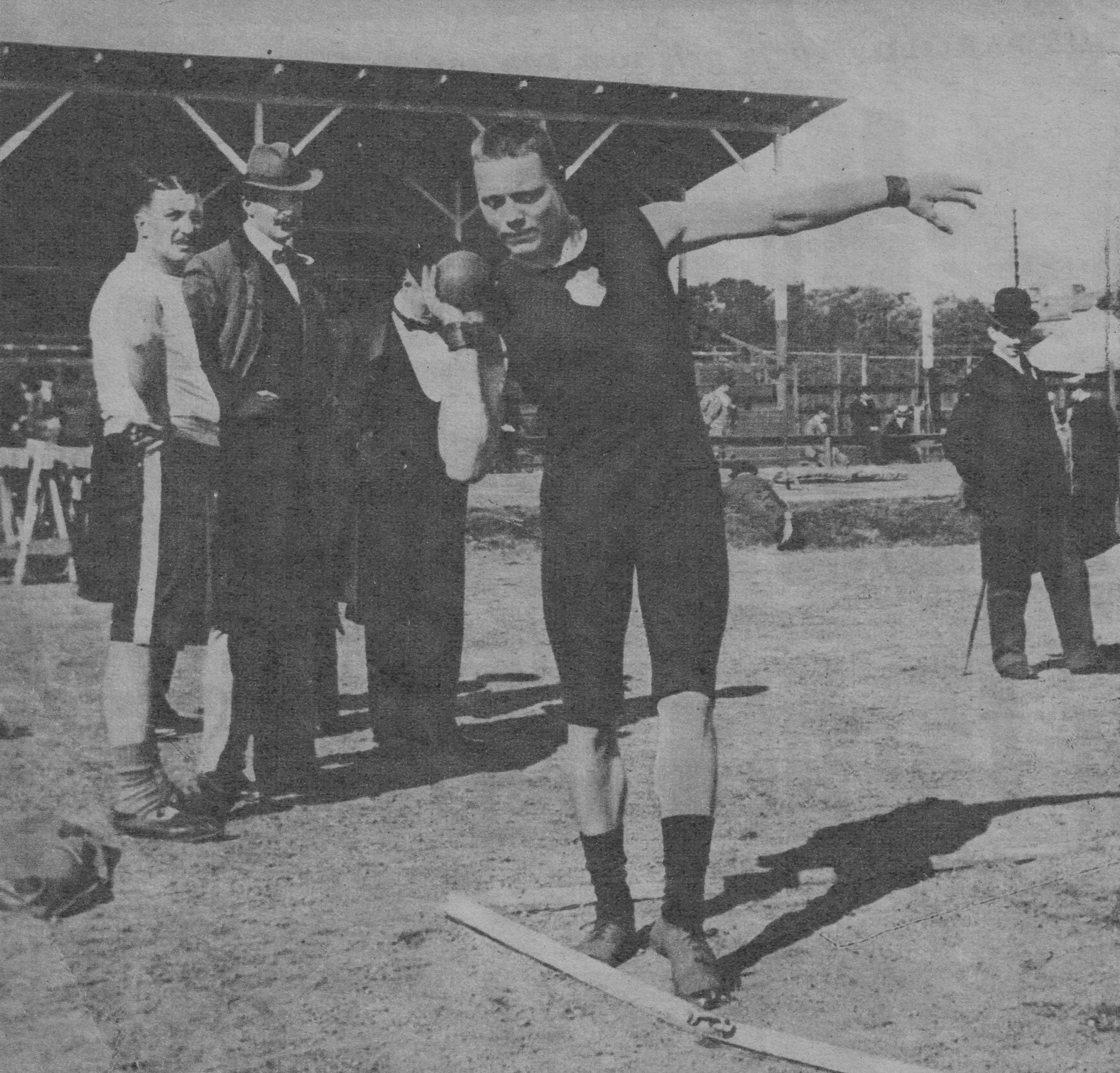
Otto Nilsson shot-putting at the 1901 Swedish athletics championships in Gothenburg.
