= Jan Kristiansen (speed skater) =

Norwegian speed skater (1934–2023)

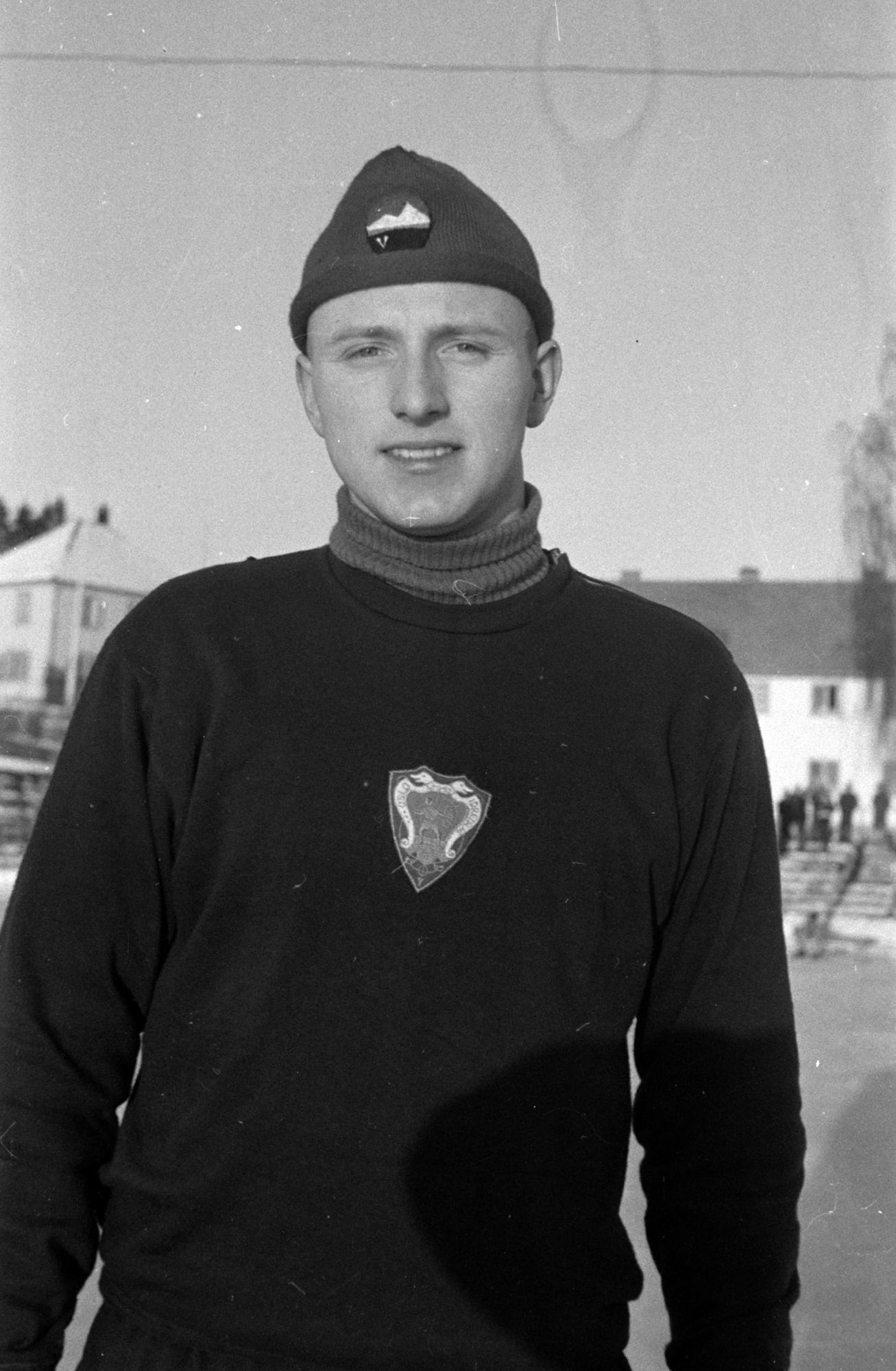
Jan Kristiansen

Jan Harald Kristiansen (22 May 1934 – 29 October 2023) was a Norwegian speed skater.

Kristiansen represented the club Oslo IL, and competed at the 1956 Winter Olympics, where he placed 16th in the 1,500 metre. His personal best times were: in the 500 metres 44.1 minutes (1957); 1500 metres 2:13.7 minutes (1956); 5000 metres 8:09.0 minutes (1963) and 10000 metres 17:18.3 minutes (1957). Kristiansen died on 29 October 2023, at the age of 89.
