= William Krigsman =

Swedish javelin thrower

Anders Wilhelm Krigsman (October 25, 1886 – March 5, 1947) was a Swedish track and field athlete who competed in the 1912 Summer Olympics. In 1912, he finished thirteenth in the two handed javelin throw event and fourteenth in the javelin throw competition.

He was born in Leksand and died in Stockholm.
