= Kaare Bache =

Norwegian triple jumper

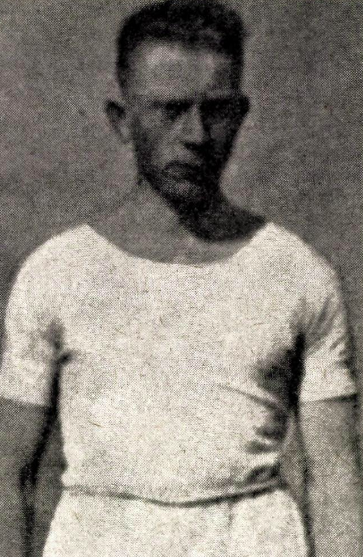
Bache around the year 1920

Kaare Bache (28 April 1898 – 13 March 1978) was a Norwegian triple jumper. He represented Kristiania IF and Oslo IL.

At the 1920 Summer Olympics he finished ninth in the triple jump final with a jump of 13.64 metres. He became Norwegian champion in triple jump in 1920 and 1925 and in decathlon in 1921.

His personal best jump was 14.63 metres, achieved in July 1920 in Kristiania.

Bache was a reserve officer in the Norwegian Army.
