= Richard Åbrink =

Swedish javelin thrower

Knut Richard Åbrink (January 1, 1889 – October 9, 1973) was a Swedish track and field athlete who competed in the 1912 Summer Olympics. In 1912, he finished sixth in the javelin throw competition and also sixth in the two handed javelin throw event.
