= Athletics at the 1908 Summer Olympics – Men's freestyle javelin throw =

Men's freestyle javelin throw at the Games of the IV Olympiad
- Venue: White City Stadium
- Date: 15 July 1908
- Competitors: 33 from 9 nations

Medalists
1st place, gold medalist(s)		Eric Lemming	Sweden
2nd place, silver medalist(s)		Michalis Dorizas	Greece
3rd place, bronze medalist(s)		Arne Halse	Norway

The men's freestyle javelin throw was one of six throwing events on the Athletics at the 1908 Summer Olympics programme in London. The javelin could be held anywhere, as opposed to the standard javelin throw which required the javelin to be held by a grip in the middle. This was the only time such a "freestyle" event was held at the Olympics. The competition was held on 15 July 1908. 33 throwers from nine nations competed. NOCs could enter up to 12 athletes.

== Records ==
This was the modern Olympic debut of the javelin throw, discounting the 1906 Intercalated Games which are no longer considered part of the Olympics.

World record	Eric Lemming (SWE)	53.90(*)	Athens	26 April 1906
Olympic record	N/A			

(*) unofficial

Eric Lemming set a new world and Olympic record throwing in the standard manner in the freestyle event. Two days later in the standard javelin throw event, Lemming improved his own world and Olympic record set in this event with 54.83 m.

== Results ==
Eric Lemming set a new world and Olympic record with 54.44 metres. He threw the javelin in a conventional manner.

Rank	Athlete	Nation	Distance	Notes
1st place, gold medalist(s)	Eric Lemming	Sweden	54.44	WR
2nd place, silver medalist(s)	Michalis Dorizas	Greece	51.36	
3rd place, bronze medalist(s)	Arne Halse	Norway	49.73	
4	Charalambos Zouras	Greece	48.61	
5	Hugo Wieslander	Sweden	47.56	
6	Armas Pesonen	Finland	46.04	
7	Imre Mudin	Hungary	45.96	
8	Jalmari Sauli	Finland	43.30	
9	Juho Halme	Finland	39.88	
10–33	Ferenc Jesina	Hungary	36.82	
10–33	Edward Barrett	Great Britain	Unknown	
10–33	Emilio Brambilla	Italy	Unknown	
10–33	Conrad Carlsrud	Norway	Unknown	
10–33	Alfred Flaxman	Great Britain	Unknown	
10–33	Nikolaos Georgantas	Greece	Unknown	
10–33	György Luntzer	Hungary	Unknown	
10–33	Walter Henderson	Great Britain	Unknown	
10–33	István Mudin	Hungary	Unknown	
10–33	Evert Jakobsson	Finland	Unknown	
10–33	Jarl Jakobsson	Finland	Unknown	
10–33	Verner Järvinen	Finland	Unknown	
10–33	John Johansen	Norway	Unknown	
10–33	Johan Kemp	Finland	Unknown	
10–33	Henry Leeke	Great Britain	Unknown	
10–33	Knut Lindberg	Sweden	Unknown	
10–33	Ernest May	Great Britain	Unknown	
10–33	Mór Kóczán	Hungary	Unknown	
10–33	Otto Nilsson	Sweden	Unknown	
10–33	Aarne Salovaara	Finland	Unknown	
10–33	Bruno Söderström	Sweden	Unknown	
10–33	František Souček	Bohemia	Unknown	
10–33	Ludwig Uettwiller	Germany	Unknown	
10–33	Emil Welz	Germany	Unknown	

== Sources ==
- Official Report of the Games of the IV Olympiad (1908).
- De Wael, Herman. Herman's Full Olympians: "Athletics 1908". Accessed 7 April 2006. Available electronically at.
