= Janne Dahl =

Swedish javelin thrower

Janne Dahl (28 December 1882 – 18 December 1961) was a Swedish track and field athlete who competed in the 1912 Summer Olympics, held in Stockholm, where he finished 15th in the men's javelin throw.
