= Athletics at the 1908 Summer Olympics – Men's javelin throw =

Men's javelin throw at the Games of the IV Olympiad
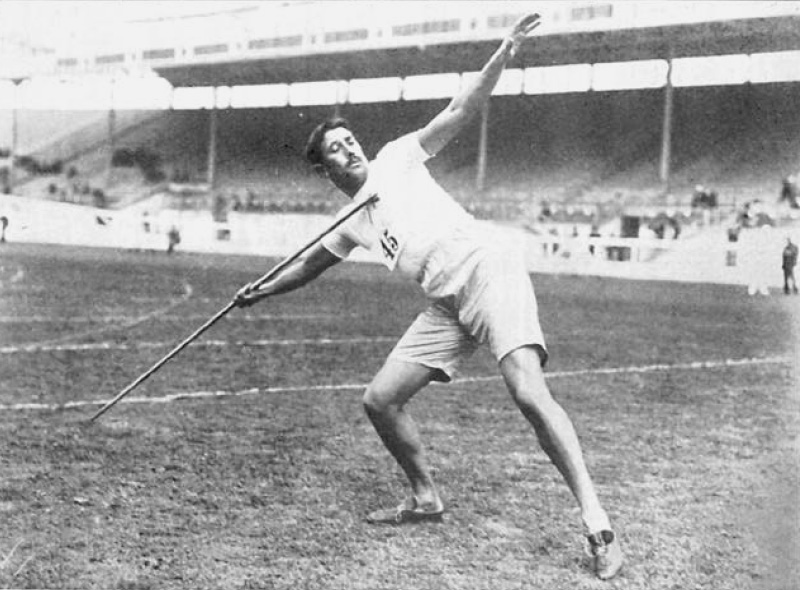
- The winner Eric Lemming
- Venue: White City Stadium
- Date: 17 July 1908
- Competitors: 16 from 6 nations

Medalists
1st place, gold medalist(s)		Eric Lemming	Sweden
2nd place, silver medalist(s)		Arne Halse	Norway
3rd place, bronze medalist(s)		Otto Nilsson	Sweden

The men's javelin throw was one of six throwing events on the Athletics at the 1908 Summer Olympics programme in London. The javelin was required to be held in the middle. The competition was held on 17 July 1908. 16 throwers from six nations competed. NOCs could enter up to 12 athletes.

== Records ==
These were the standing world and Olympic records (in metres) prior to this competition. Two days earlier in the freestyle javelin throw event Eric Lemming improved his own world and Olympic record set at the 1906 Summer Olympics with 53.90 m (he threw the javelin in a conventional manner).

World record	54.44(*)	(Sweden) Eric Lemming	London (GBR)	15 July 1908
Olympic record	54.44	(Sweden) Eric Lemming	London (GBR)	15 July 1908

(*) unofficial

Eric Lemming set a new world and Olympic record with 54.83 m.

== Results ==
Place	Name	Nation	Distance
1	Eric Lemming	Sweden	54.83 metres WR
2	Arne Halse	Norway	50.57 metres
3	Otto Nilsson	Sweden	47.11 metres
4	Aarne Salovaara	Finland	45.89 metres
5	Armas Pesonen	Finland	45.18 metres
6	Juho Halme	Finland	44.96 metres
7	Jalmari Sauli	Finland	Unknown
8-16	Carl Bechler	Germany	Unknown
8-16	Evert Jakobsson	Finland	Unknown
8-16	Jarl Jakobsson	Finland	Unknown
8-16	John Johansen	Norway	Unknown
8-16	Henry Leeke	Great Britain	Unknown
8-16	Ernest May	Great Britain	Unknown
8-16	Jimmy Tremeer	Great Britain	Unknown
8-16	Hugo Wieslander	Sweden	Unknown
8-16	Charalambos Zouras	Greece	Unknown

== Sources ==
- Official Report of the Games of the IV Olympiad (1908).
- De Wael, Herman. Herman's Full Olympians: "Athletics 1908". Accessed 7 April 2006. Available electronically at.
