= Espersen =

Espersen is a surname. Notable people with the surname include:

- Lene Espersen (born 1965), Danish politician
- Mikael Espersen, Danish lightweight rower
- Ole Espersen (1934–2020), Danish politician
- Søren Espersen (born 1953), Danish politician, journalist, and writer

== See also ==
- Jespersen
