= Svante Olsson =

Swedish javelin thrower

Bror Svante Olsson (20 May 1893 – 8 April 1955) was a Swedish track and field athlete who competed in the 1912 Summer Olympics. In 1912, he finished 13th place in the javelin throw competition.
