= Lee Talbott =

American sportsman (1887–1954)

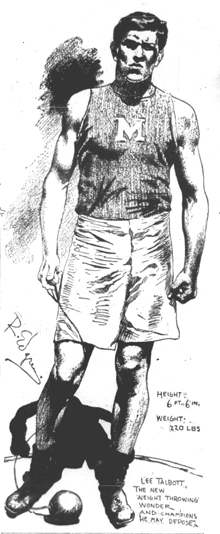
- Lee Talbott in a sketch by Robert Edgren, 1907

Personal information
- Born: July 12, 1887 Kansas City, Missouri, U.S.
- Died: September 16, 1954 (aged 67) Kansas City, Missouri, U.S.

Leander James 'Lee' Talbott (July 12, 1887 – September 16, 1954) was an American track and field athlete, tug of war competitor, and wrestler from Kansas City, Missouri. He attended the Mercersburg Academy and was a weight thrower and wrestler, first at Cornell University in 1907 and then at Penn State in 1909. He was a member of the Kansas City Athletic Club, and he competed in the 1908 Summer Olympics as a member of the Irish American Athletic Club. In his prime, Talbott stood 6' 6" inches and weighed 220 lbs.

In 1908 he finished fifth in the hammer throw competition, sixth in the discus throw event, and eighth in the shot put competition.

Talbott was a member of the American tug of war team that refused to compete against the Liverpool Police team after the first round of the controversial Olympic tug of war event. He also participated as a wrestler in the freestyle heavyweight event but was eliminated in the first round after losing his bout to the upcoming gold medalist, Con O'Kelly. He is the only athlete to compete in three sports at one Olympic Games celebration.

In 1909, he won the hammer throw in the Amateur Athletic Union championship, and in 1909 and 1915, he was the champion in the 56-lb. weight throw. Between 1909 and 1917, Talbott won 20 medals at the Amateur Athletic Union championships in the shot put, discus throw, hammer throw, and the 56-lb. weight throw.

== See also ==
- List of Pennsylvania State University Olympians

== Notes ==
- Evans, Hilary; Gjerde, Arild; Heijmans, Jeroen; Mallon, Bill; et al. "Lee Talbott". Olympics at Sports-Reference.com. Sports Reference LLC. Archived from the original on April 17, 2020.
