= Paul Willführ =

German track and field athlete

Paul Willführ (30 October 1885, Hanover – 22 April 1922) was a German track and field athlete who competed in the 1912 Summer Olympics. In 1912, he finished 23rd in the javelin throw competition and 18th in the shot put event. He also participated in the discus throw event, but he was unable to set a width. All of his three attempts were invalid.
