= Algot Larsson =

Swedish javelin thrower

Algot Larsson (29 November 1889 – 12 November 1967) was a Swedish track and field athlete who competed in the 1912 Summer Olympics. In 1912, he finished 21st in the javelin throw competition.
