= John Møller =

Norwegian sport shooter

Personal information
- Born: 9 January 1866 Nes, Akershus
- Died: 15 January 1935 (aged 69) Oslo
Medal record
Shooting
Representing Norway
1906 Intercalated Games
Silver medal – second place	1906 Athens	Team free rifle

John Møller (9 January 1866 – 15 January 1935) was a Norwegian rifle shooter. He was born in Nes, Akershus. He won a silver medal in free rifle team at the 1906 Summer Olympics in Athens, together with Gudbrand Skatteboe, Julius Braathe, Albert Helgerud and Ole Holm.
