= Armas Pesonen =

Finnish javelin thrower (1885–1947)

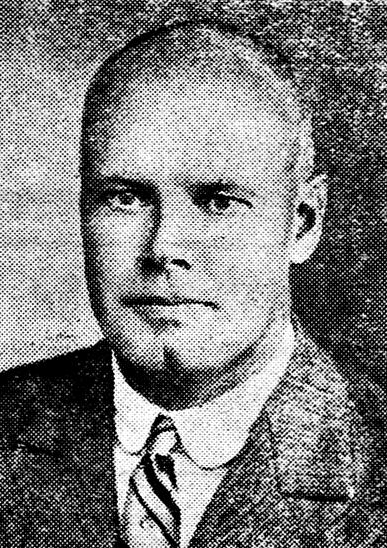
- Armas Pesonen, circa 1935

Personal information
- Full name: Armas Johannes Pesonen
- National team: Finland
- Born: 25 March 1885 Kuopion maalaiskunta, Grand Duchy of Finland, Russian Empire
- Died: 20 May 1947 (aged 62) Helsinki, Finland
- Occupation: Station master
- Spouse: Irene Lempinen

Sport
- Sport: Track and field
- Events: Javelin throw, long jump
- Club: Viipurin Reipas

Achievements and titles
- Personal bests: Javelin throw: better hand: 50.62 m (1909); two-handed: 89.28 m (1909)

Armas Johannes Pesonen (25 March 1885 – 20 May 1947) was a Finnish track and field athlete who competed at the 1908 Summer Olympics.

== Athletics ==
Armas Pesonen at the Olympic Games
Games	Event	Rank	Result	Notes
1908 Summer Olympics	Javelin throw	5th	45.18	Source:
1908 Summer Olympics	Freestyle javelin throw	6th	46.04	Source: His result briefly held the Olympic record in the event.
1908 Summer Olympics	Long jump	Did not start		Source:

He is credited with a Finnish record in long jump, result 636, made on 7 July 1906.

His personal best in javelin was 50.62 metres with his better hand and 89.28 metres as his two handed total. He recorded them in the qualification round of the 1909 Finnish championships.

== Career ==
He began working in the Finnish state railways at the age of 19, eventually becoming a station master in 1928.

He fought in the Finnish Civil War in Karelia. He briefly served in the Finnish Defence Forces, reaching the rank of lieutenant. He later took part in White Guard activities.

== Sources ==
- Siukonen, Markku (2001). Urheilukunniamme puolustajat. Suomen olympiaedustajat 1906–2000. Suuri olympiateos (in Finnish). Vol. 12. Jyväskylä: Graface. p. 315. ISBN 951-98673-1-7.
