= Jesperson =

Jesperson is a surname. Notable people with the surname include:

- Keith Hunter Jesperson (born 1955), Canadian-American serial killer
- Paul Jesperson (born 1992), American basketball player
- Peter Jesperson, American music-industry businessman

== See also ==
- Jespersen
