= Arvid Ohrling =

Swedish javelin thrower

Arvid Ohrling (February 1, 1887 – April 11, 1972) was a Swedish track and field athlete who competed in the 1912 Summer Olympics. He was born in Gävle and died in Solna Municipality. In 1912, he finished tenth in the two handed javelin throw event and 16th in the javelin throw competition.
