= Eskil Falk =

Swedish javelin thrower

Eskil Adolf Falk (4 February 1889 – 24 March 1963) was a Swedish track and field athlete who competed in the 1912 Summer Olympics. In 1912, he participated in the javelin throw competition, but all three of his attempts were invalid.
