= Per Olsen (swimmer) =

Norwegian swimmer

Personal information
- Nationality: Norwegian
- Born: 24 July 1934 Oslo, Norway
- Died: 11 May 2022 (aged 87)

Sport
- Sport: Swimming
- Club: Oslo IL

Per Olsen (24 July 1934 – 11 May 2022) was a Norwegian former freestyle swimmer. He competed in the men's 100 and 400 metre freestyles at the 1952 Summer Olympics.
