= Daniel Johansen (athlete) =

Norwegian javelin thrower

Daniel Victor Sundsten Johansen (2 April 1885 – 7 December 1967) was a Norwegian track and field athlete who competed in the 1912 Summer Olympics.

In 1912 he finished seventh in the two handed javelin throw event and twelfth in the javelin throw competition.

He represented the club Oslo IL. He became national champion every year between 1911 and 1915. He also won silver medals in 1907 and 1908 and a bronze in 1910.
