= Berezovsky v Abramovich =

English contract law case

- Court: High Court of Justice
- Full case name: Boris Abramovich Berezovsky v Roman Arkadievich Abramovich
- Decided: 31 August 2012
- Citation: [2012] EWHC 2463 (Comm)

Court membership
- Judge sitting: Gloster J

Keywords
- Contract, formation, uncertainty

Berezovsky v Abramovich [2012] EWHC 2463 (Comm) is an English contract law case concerning the formation of an informally made contract where the evidence was contested.

The case involved two Russian oligarchs and arose directly from the privatisation in Russia that followed the collapse of the Soviet Union. It was also the first paperless case to be heard in the Commercial Court, where it came before Dame Elizabeth Gloster.

== Facts ==
Boris Berezovsky, one of the Russian oligarchs who amassed considerable wealth under the presidency of Boris Yeltsin, claimed that in 1995 he had concluded an agreement with Roman Abramovich. Under the alleged contract, Berezovsky was to receive half the profits generated by the Russian oil company Sibneft. He further claimed that in 2001 he was forced to sell his stake in the company following threats made by Abramovich after Vladimir Putin’s government came to power. Abramovich denied each of these allegations. The central issue in the case was whether there was any credible evidence that a binding agreement had ever been made.

== Process and judgment ==
In the course of the proceedings, Berezovsky was accused of lying.

Gloster J, sitting in the Commercial Court division of the High Court, found that Berezovsky was not a credible witness, that no agreement intended to be legally enforceable had ever been concluded, and that no threats had been made. In her ruling, the judge described Berezovsky as an unconvincing and unreliable witness who shaped his account of the truth to suit his immediate objectives.

== Significance ==
The case was the last in which Jonathan Sumption appeared as a barrister. He postponed his appointment to the UK Supreme Court in order to complete his work on the matter. A year later, Berezovsky took his own life by hanging.

== In popular culture ==
The 2017 book The Age of Berezovsky by Petr Aven contains numerous details of the case. According to the book, in the High Court "Berezovsky accused his former partner of forcing him to sell his shares in ORT, Rusal, and Sibneft cheaply, exerting political influence". Aven relates that Berezovsky's legal team was prepared to lose the Sibneft claims but expected to succeed on the Rusal claims; the eventual failure on all counts may have contributed to Berezovsky's decision to take his own life. The book notes that Berezovsky made a poor impression on the judge by appearing too "visibly flustered" (which the book attributes to alcohol consumption) and by attempting to defend himself without a lawyer, while unable to speak English well enough for a court case—for example, referring to the judge as "an experienced woman".

The High Court proceedings were dramatised in Peter Morgan's 2022 play Patriots, which recounts the life of Berezovsky.

== See also ==
- English contract law
- Norebo conflict
- Burlakov case
