= Trine Krogh =

Norwegian swimmer

Personal information
- Nationality: Norwegian
- Born: 18 January 1955 Oslo, Norway
- Died: 3 May 2014 (aged 59)

Sport
- Sport: Swimming
- Club: Oslo IL

Trine Krogh (18 January 1955 – 3 May 2014) was a Norwegian freestyle, butterfly and medley swimmer. She was born in Oslo, and represented the club Oslo IL. She competed at the 1972 Summer Olympics in Munich, in 200 m medley and 400 m medley.

She won a total of 51 individual narional titles, including 21 in freestyle, 15 medley titles, 14 butterfly titles, and one in backstroke. She set 76 national records.
