= Mathias Glomnes =

Norwegian sports shooter (1869–1956)

Personal information
- Born: 2 February 1869 Stryn, Norway
- Died: 5 June 1956 (aged 87) Stryn, Norway

Sport
- Sport: Sports shooting

Mathias E. Glomnes (2 February 1869 – 5 June 1956) was a Norwegian sport shooter who competed in the 1908 Summer Olympics and in the 1912 Summer Olympics.

In 1908, he finished sixth with the Norwegian team in the team military rifle event. In the 1000 yard free rifle competition as well as in the 300 metre free rifle event he finished 47th. Four years later, he finished sixth with the Norwegian team in the team military rifle event. In the 300 metre military rifle, three positions competition, he finished 35th.
