= Finn Varde Jespersen =

Norwegian orienteer (1914–1944)

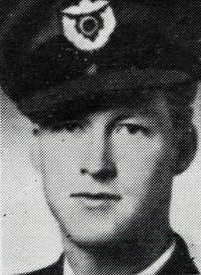
- Born: 4 April 1914; Kristiania
- Died: 6 June 1944 (aged 30); Cherbourg
- Occupation: Pilot
- Known for: Orienteering achievements

Finn Varde Jespersen (4 April 1914 – 6 June 1944) was among Norway's leading orienteers in the late 1930s. During World War II, he was a pilot with the rank of lieutenant. He perished during the invasion of Normandy.

== Orienteering career ==
He was born in Kristiania. His parents were Per Mathias Jespersen and Anna Jespersen née Johnsen, both from Skien. In the 1930s he was an active sportsman competing in orienteering for the club IL Heming. He represented the Norwegian national team in the third Scandinavian cup in September 1939, where only Sweden and Norway participated because of travel restrictions for the Finnish athletes due to the recent outbreak of war, and Jespersen placed third in the individual contest. In the 1940 season he won a contest in Finland ahead of the Finnish orienteers Börje Malmström, Jan Gripenberg and Birger Lönnberg. This result has been described as the first noted Norwegian orienteering victory in Finland.

== World War II ==
Jespersen participated in the fighting during the German invasion of Norway in 1940. He then embarked on a long journey via Finland, Russia, Japan, crossing the Pacific Ocean and finally reaching North America. He received his pilot training at the Little Norway training camp in Toronto, Ontario, Canada. Fellow orienteer Per Bergsland from IL Heming also trained as a pilot in Toronto. Jespersen served as an instructor at the training school, and later as a pilot flying transport planes. After having been trained on combat aircraft, he joined RAF Bomber Command. Lieutenant Jespersen's Lancaster of 97 Squadron was shot down over Cherbourg the night between 5 and 6 June 1944. He was awarded the Haakon VII 70th Anniversary Medal posthumously.

His diaries from 1940, edited by and with comments by John Berg, were published in 1983 as 9. april kommer jeg aldri til å glemme.... .
