= Anna Jespersen =

American geologist

- Born: December 14, 1895; Dubuque, Iowa, U.S.A.
- Died: July 15, 1989 (aged 93); Lethbridge, Alberta, Canada
- Education: South Dakota State College, George Washington University
- Known for: Aeromagnetic Surveying
- Scientific career
- Fields: Geology
- Workplaces: United States Geological Survey, Arctic Institute of North America

Anna Jespersen (December 14, 1895 - July 15, 1989) was an American geologist best known for her aeromagnetic surveying work. Jespersen began her career as a teacher before commencing a 45-year scientific career, spending the vast majority of her time working for the United States Geological Survey developing and publishing her work on aeromagnetic surveying. In her later years, she moved on to work with Ghana and the United Nations. Her career in the geological field came to a close after she completed her work with the Arctic Institute.

== Early life and education ==
Jespersen was born on December 14, 1895, in Dubuque, Iowa, to Oline and John Jespersen. She started primary school at the age of five in Clinton, Iowa, and graduated secondary school in Webster, South Dakota. After World War I, Jespersen moved to Brookings, South Dakota where she studied at South Dakota State College. While working for the U.S Geological Survey in Washington, D.C., Jespersen attended night classes at George Washington University, where she obtained her master's degree in Geology.

== Work ==
At the age of 19, Jespersen started teaching at a rural school located in Day County South Dakota. She was also a geologist with the U.S. Geological Survey in Washington, D.C. From 1941 to 1945, she worked as an editor with John Wiley & Sons publishing company before deciding to move back to Washington, D.C. and continue working for the U.S. Geological Survey. Jespersen also worked internationally, attending meetings of the International Geological Congress, including meetings in Montreal, Prague, Iceland, Copenhagen, and Algiers.

In 1963, she co-published the geological survey, Aeromagnetic Interpretation of the Geology of the Greenwood Lake and Sloatsburg quadrangles, New York and New Jersey, with fellow geologist Andrew Griscom.

In 1964, Jespersen created a map titled Aeromagnetic Interpretation of the Globe - Miami Copper District, Gila and Pinal Counties, Arizona. This map was created under the publishing organization U.S. Geological Survey. To create this, quadrangles in the highlands were surveyed by the Geological Survey in order to gather additional information in regard to the magnetite deposits within bodies of water and marshes located in the Precambrian belt. The copper- mineralized belt Jespersen had surveyed was discovered in 1874. Initially only 60 percent of the copper belt was covered in volcanic and surficial deposits. These areas were aero magnetically surveyed using a continuously recording AN/ASQ-3A airborne magnetometer installed on a twin-engine aircraft. The flight path of the aircraft was recorded during the process by a gyro stabilized 35-millimeter continuous-strip-film camera as well as a radar altimeter to ensure accuracy in the map. The data collected within this survey and the corresponding map contributed to the geologic mapping processes significantly. The mapping process is now able to account for more detail by allowing for different layers of rock to be analyzed in terms of magnetic data and then illustrated in a comprehensive fashion. Within their studies, Jesperson and Hotz mapped out for four different kinds of rocks. In their discovery they found Meta-Sedimentary rocks, Quartz-Plagioclase Gneiss, Hornblende Granite and Granite Pegmatite.

== Retirement and death ==
After her retirement from the U.S. Geological Survey at the age of 70, Jespersen was a consultant to the government of Ghana for 15 months, and she also worked with the Arctic Institute and the United Nations. After working with these organizations, Jespersen toured the world before settling in Lethbridge, Alberta to be close with her family and to write her final memoirs. Jespersen died in 1989 at the age of 94.
