= Carl Klæth =

Norwegian gymnast (1887–1966)

- Born: 3 July 1887 Steinkjer, United Kingdoms of Sweden and Norway
- Died: 16 August 1966 (aged 79) Steinkjer, Norway

Gymnastics career
- Discipline: Men's artistic gymnastics
- Country represented: Norway
- Gym: Stenkjer Turnforening
Medal record
Men's artistic gymnastics
Representing Norway
Olympic Games
Silver medal – second place	1908 London	Team

Carl Klæth (3 July 1887, Steinkjer – 16 August 1966, Steinkjer) was a Norwegian gymnast who competed in the 1908 Summer Olympics.

As a member of the Norwegian team, he won the silver medal in the gymnastics team event in 1908. He was born and died in Steinkjer and represented the club Steinkjer TF.
