= John Johansen (athlete) =

Norwegian sprinter and javelin thrower

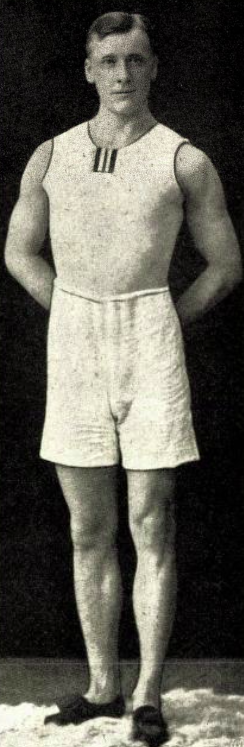
Photo of John Johansen

John Johansen (26 February 1883 – 15 October 1947) was a Norwegian sprinter.

Participating at the 1908 Summer Olympics, Johansen placed second in his first round 100 metres heat with a time of 11.7 seconds. His loss to Robert Cloughen, who had run the course in 11.0 seconds, resulted in Johansen's elimination from competition. Johansen also competed in the javelin throw and freestyle javelin throw events, albeit with unknown results. He became Norwegian champion in 100 metres in 1906 and 1909. He represented IF Ørnulf in Kristiania and later SK Brage in Trondhjem.

== Sources ==
- Cook, Theodore Andrea (1908). The Fourth Olympiad, Being the Official Report. London: British Olympic Association.
