= Oscar Larsen =

Norwegian athlete

Oscar Larsen (September 11, 1887 – April 16, 1975) was a Norwegian middle distance runner. He represented Kristiania IF.

Participating at the 1908 Summer Olympics, Larsen placed fourth of seven in his initial 1500 metres semifinal heat and did not advance to the final. At the 1912 Summer Olympics, he participated in both 800 and 1500 metres without reaching the final. He became Norwegian champion in the 800 metres in 1911 and 1914 and in the 1500 metres in 1911, 1914 and 1915.

== Sources ==
- Cook, Theodore Andrea (1908). The Fourth Olympiad, Being the Official Report. London: British Olympic Association.
