= Nicolai Kiær =

Norwegian gymnast

- Born: 2 April 1888 Kristiania, United Kingdoms of Sweden and Norway
- Died: 29 May 1934 (aged 46) Yiyang, Republic of China

Gymnastics career
- Discipline: Men's artistic gymnastics
- Country represented: Norway
- Gym: Chistiania Turnforening
Medal record
Men's artistic gymnastics
Representing Norway
Olympic Games
Silver medal – second place	1908 London	Team

Nicolai Kiær (2 April 1888 – 29 May 1934 in Hunan, China) was a Norwegian gymnast who competed in the 1908 Summer Olympics. As a member of the Norwegian team, he won the silver medal in the gymnastics team event in 1908. Kiær drowned in a river in Hunan, China, while working for the Norwegian Lutheran Mission.
