= Steinkjer TF =

Norwegian gymnastics club

Steinkjer Turnforening is a Norwegian gymnastics club from Steinkjer.

It was founded as Stenkjær TF on 9 October 1888.

Four Olympic gymnasts have represented the club: 1906 gold medalists Osvald Falch and Kristian Fjerdingen, as well as 1908 silver medalists Carl Klæth and John Skrataas.
