= Sverre Grøner =

Norwegian artistic gymnast

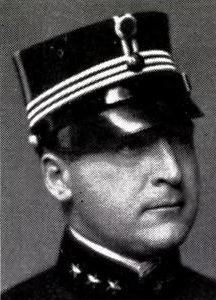

Personal information
- Born: 17 September 1890 Gjerpen, United Kingdoms of Sweden and Norway
- Died: 3 February 1972 (aged 81) Oslo, Norway

Gymnastics career
- Discipline: Men's artistic gymnastics
- Country represented: Norway
- Gym: Chistiania Turnforening
Medal record
Men's artistic gymnastics
Representing Norway
Olympic Games
Silver medal – second place	1908 London	Team

Sverre Grøner (17 September 1890 – 3 February 1972) was a Norwegian gymnast who competed in the 1908 Summer Olympics. As a member of the Norwegian team, he won the silver medal in the gymnastics team event in 1908.
