= Jacob Gundersen =

Norwegian wrestler (1875–1968)

Medal record

Representing Norway

Men's freestyle wrestling

Olympic Games
| Silver medal – second place | 1908 London | Heavyweight |

Jacob Gundersen (29 October 1875 – 21 January 1968) was a Norwegian-American who represented Norway in the 1908 Olympics. He was a freestyle wrestler and Olympic medalist.

Gundersen was born in Fjære Municipality (later incorporated into Grimstad Municipality), in Nedenes county, Norway. He received a silver medal in the heavyweight class at the 1908 Summer Olympics in London. The heavyweight class had eleven competitors, nine wrestlers from the UK, one from the US, and Gundersen from Norway. Gundersen defeated Walter West, Frederick Humphreys and Edward Nixson, but lost to Con O'Kelly in the final. Jacob Gundersen died in Westchester, New York.
