= Jørgen Bru =

Norwegian sport shooter (1881–1974)

Personal information
- Born: 5 January 1881 Vestfold, Norway
- Died: 17 December 1974 (aged 93) Vestfold, Norway

Sport
- Sport: Sports shooting

Jørgen Anders Bru (5 January 1881 – 17 December 1974) was a Norwegian sport shooter who competed in the 1908 Summer Olympics.

In 1908, he finished sixth with the Norwegian team in the team military rifle event. In the 1000 yard free rifle competition he finished 28th.
