= Con O'Kelly =

Irish wrestler

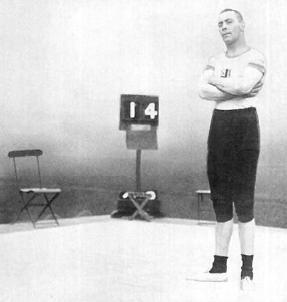
- O'Kelly in 1908

Personal information
- Nickname: Con
- Nationality: Irish
- Born: George Cornelius O'Kelly; 29 October 1886 Dunmanway, County Cork, Ireland
- Died: 3 November 1947 (aged 61) Kingston upon Hull, East Riding of Yorkshire, England
- Height: 6 ft 3 in (191 cm)
- Weight: 220 lb (100 kg)

Boxing career
- Weight class: Heavyweight
Medal record
Men's freestyle wrestling
Representing (United Kingdom) Great Britain
Olympic Games
Gold medal – first place	1908 London	Heavyweight

George Cornelius "Con" O'Kelly (29 October 1886 – 3 November 1947) was an Irish sport wrestler who competed for Great Britain in the 1908 Summer Olympics, where he won a gold medal.

== Career ==
O'Kelly was born in County Cork, Ireland, on 29 October 1886. After he left school, he moved to Hull in England and lodged with Mr and Mrs Larvin in their home at 9 Blanket Row. On 18 September 1902, he joined the Kingston upon Hull City Police and was seconded to the local fire brigade.

He was introduced to wrestling by his colleagues and entered a variety of local competitions. He volunteered to fight the Northern Counties champion, whom he promptly defeated in around three minutes. He was entered by his local wrestling club into the British Amateur Wrestling Heavyweight Championship, which he won.

In March 1908 a wall collapsed on him while he was fighting a fire at a sawmill. He recovered from damage to his back and shoulder in time for the 1908 Summer Olympics in London, where he defeated Lee Talbott, Harry Foskett and Edward Barrett in order to reach the Olympic final where he beat Jacob Gundersen for the gold medal. He was presented with his medal by Queen Alexandra, who also gave him a green oak leaf badge.

A crowd of over 12,000 greeted him on his return to Hull. He was carried to a decorated horse-drawn fire engine, which paraded the medalist around the city. He continued to wrestle after his Olympic victory, and even fought in New York City. The New York Times reported that his fight against Pat Connolly on 22 November 1909 turned into a fist fight after Connolly gouged O'Kelly's eyes and the two started trading blows, resulting in a double disqualification after 29 minutes of the bout. The New York Times referred to it as "the worst wrestling bout that has ever been held in this city".

== Personal life ==
He married the daughter of his landlord in Hull, Sabina Larvin. His son, George Cornelius "Con" O'Kelly Jr., appeared for the British team as a boxer in the heavyweight category at the 1924 Summer Olympics in Paris, France.
