= John Falchenberg =

Norwegian discus thrower

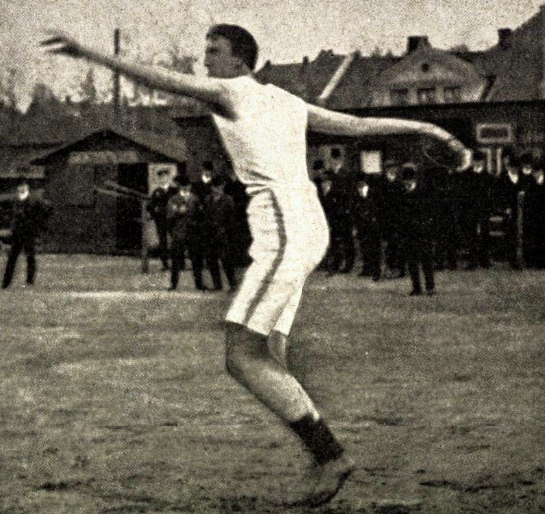
John throws to victory in Stockholm on 1 October 1904

John Falchenberg (12 September 1883 – 5 November 1960) was a Norwegian discus thrower. He represented Kristiania IF and IK Tjalve.

At the 1908 Summer Olympics, he competed in the discus final with a throw of unknown length. He became Norwegian champion in discus throw in the years 1904, 1906-1908 and 1911-1912. In 1904 he became national champion in shot put as well.

His personal best throw was 46.48 metres, achieved in August 1926 on Bislett stadion.
