= Kristian Fjerdingen =

Norwegian artistic gymnast (1884–1975)

- Full name: Kristian Adolf Fjerdingen
- Born: 16 September 1884 Steinkjer, United Kingdoms of Sweden and Norway
- Died: 5 February 1975 (aged 90) Steinkjer, Norway

Gymnastics career
- Discipline: Men's artistic gymnastics
- Country represented: Norway
- Gym: Stenkjer Turnforening
Medal record
Men's artistic gymnastics
Representing Norway
Intercalated Games
Gold medal – first place	1906 Athens	Team

Kristian Adolf Fjerdingen (16 September 1884 – 5 February 1975) was a Norwegian gymnast who competed in the 1906 Summer Olympics.

In 1906 he won the gold medal as member of the Norwegian gymnastics team in the team competition. He was born and died in Steinkjer and represented the club Steinkjer TF.
