= Arne Halse =

Norwegian javelin thrower (1887–1975)

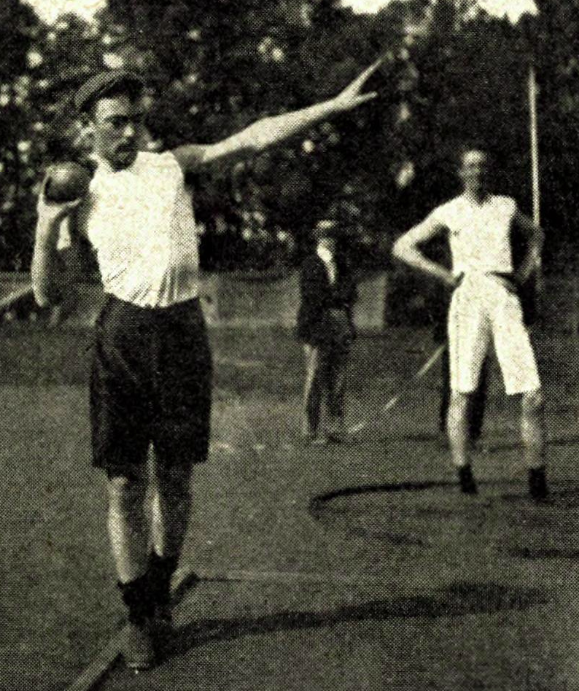
- Arne Halse puts a shot at the Old Frogner Stadion in Oslo on 1–2 September 1906.

Arne Halse
Medal record

Men's athletics

Representing Norway

Olympic Games
Silver medal – second place	1908 London	Javelin
Bronze medal – third place	1908 London	Freestyle javelin

Arne Halse (20 October 1887 – 3 July 1975) was a Norwegian athlete who specialized in the different forms of javelin throw. He represented Trondhjems IF and later SK Brage, both in Trondheim.

At the 1906 Summer Olympics, he finished seventh in the freestyle javelin throw. At the 1908 Summer Olympics he won a silver medal in the regular javelin throw, a bronze medal in freestyle and finished fifth in shot put. At the 1912 Summer Olympics, he finished seventh in the regular javelin throw and fifth in the two-handed javelin throw.

He became Norwegian champion in javelin throw in 1905–1907 and 1909 and in shot put in 1906–1907 and 1909.
