= Asmund Enger =

Norwegian sports shooter (1881–1966)

Personal information
- Full name: Asmund Johansen Enger
- Born: 30 September 1881 Nordre Land, Norway
- Died: 11 April 1966 (aged 84) Nordre Land, Norway

Sport
- Sport: Sports shooting
- Club: Gjøvik og Brusveen SL

Asmund Enger (30 September 1881 – 11 April 1966) was a Norwegian forester, agrarian leader, and sports shooter.

He was born in Nordre Land Municipality as a son of editor Johan Enger (1853–1925) and Inger Mathea née Frøisland, and grew up at the family farm in Østsinni.

Enger worked as a journalist in his early career. Within the press, he served as editor of Norsk Skyttertidende and chairman of Nationen and Vestopland. As a sport shooter, he competed in two events at the 1906 Intercalated Games and one event at the 1908 Summer Olympics. His best placement was a 19th place in 1906.

Enger was the deputy chairman of the Norwegian Agrarian Association for 20 years. He chaired Norges Kreditforening for Land- og Skogbruk from 1934 to 1955 (board member since 1915) and several other loan institutions for Norwegian agriculture. He was named to several public commissions in agriculture, forestry, foreign trade, and military industry. He was a board member of Hunton Bruk, Norma Projektilfabrik, Valdres Skiferbrud and other corporations, and sat on the supervisory council of Borregaard for 35 years including a period as chairman.

He was decorated as a Knight, First Class of the Order of St. Olav in 1937. Asmund Enger died in 1966, aged 85.
