= Otto Haug =

Norwegian athlete

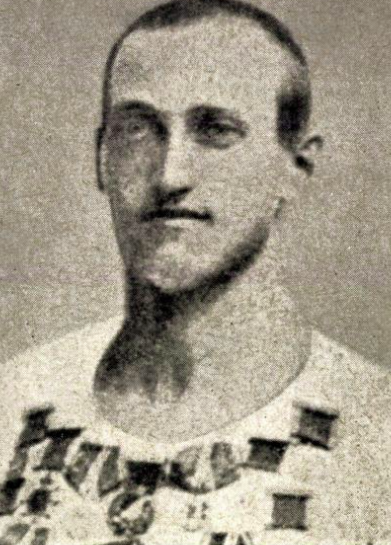

Personal information
- Nationality: Norwegian
- Born: 24 July 1876 Oslo, Norway
- Died: 3 March 1948 (aged 71) Oslo, Norway

Sport
- Sport: Athletics
- Event: Polevaulting

Otto Haug (24 July 1876 – 3 March 1948) was a Norwegian athlete. He competed in the polevault at the 1906 Intercalated Games.
