= Murmansk Arctic University =

Technical university in Murmansk, Russia

- Мурманский арктический университет
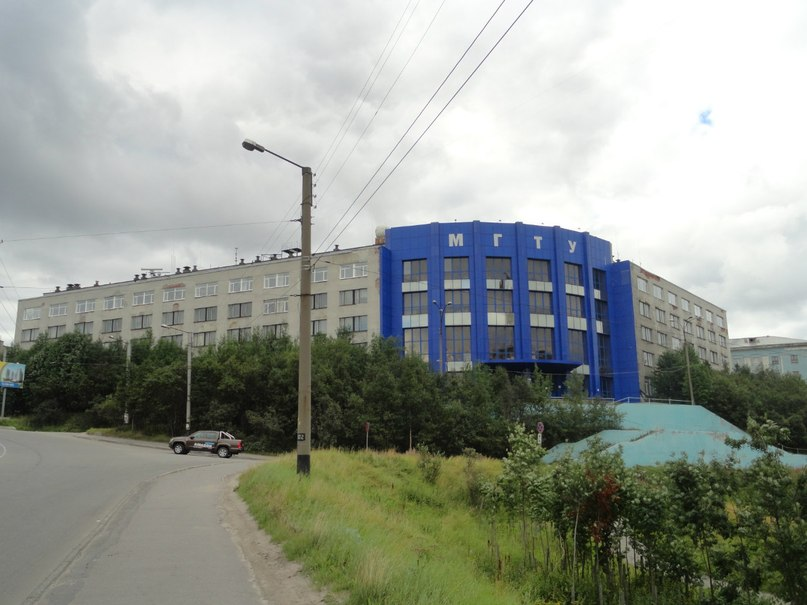
- Murmansk Arctic University
- Type: Public
- Established: 1939 (2023 in current form)
- Affiliations: University of the Arctic
- Rector: Maria Knyazeva
- Students: 8000
- Undergraduates: 7700
- Postgraduates: 300
- Location: Murmansk, Murmansk Oblast, Russia; 68°57′13″N 33°03′47″E
- Campus: Urban
- Website: mauniver.ru

Murmansk Arctic University (Russian: Мурманский арктический университет (МАУ)) founded in 1950 is the largest university in Murmansk.

== History ==
=== Murmansk Teachers' Institute (1939-1956) ===
On November 13, 1939, a two-year evening teacher training institute, later expanded to a daytime program, opened in Murmansk. The institute was designed to provide staff for schools in the Murmansk Oblast (due to the region's gradually growing population) by training teachers for grades 5–7 for general education schools. Initially, there were three departments: physics and mathematics, history and philology, and chemistry and biology (later natural sciences and geography). Accelerated courses and correspondence teacher training were also offered. Initially, the institute had 75 students.

With the outbreak of the Great Patriotic War, the institute ceased operations and only resumed in 1944. Due to a shortage of teachers and resources, the natural sciences and geography department never opened. The institute had five classrooms, 17 teachers, and 87 students, out of a planned capacity of 125.

To develop the institute's educational and research potential, specialists were invited from Moscow and Leningrad, new specialized courses were introduced, and departments were established: Marxism-Leninism, Russian language and literature, pedagogy and psychology, mathematics, physics, and military physical training. After the end of the Great Patriotic War, the institute began training physical education teachers. Classes were also offered in mechanical engineering, film cameras, and photography. By the mid-1950s, the institute had trained approximately five hundred teachers.

=== Murmansk State Pedagogical Institute ===
On February 7, 1956, the Council of Ministers of the RSFSR ordered the reorganization of the Murmansk two-year Teachers' Institute into a five-year pedagogical institute. The institute's departments were transformed into the History and Philology and Physics and Mathematics departments. In 1959, the Faculty of Primary School Teachers was established, but after two graduates, it was forced to suspend its work and resume in 1978.

In 1962, the Faculty of Social Professions opened, aimed at providing students with a second, additional profession: theater, artistic recitation, choreography, vocal and choral art, cinema, sports, art history, music, nursing, etc.

In the late 1980s, the institute launched educational television, computer labs were added, and training of computer science teachers began. During this period, international ties began to develop with the University of Lapland in Rovaniemi (Finland), the Political Science Institute of Groningen (the Netherlands), and Luleå University (Sweden). By the late 1990s, the university had approximately 6,000 students studying in 28 specialties, established its own graduate program and dissertation councils in general pedagogy and Russian history, and established a system of learning centers providing additional educational services to the public.

=== Murmansk State Pedagogical University (2002–2010) ===
Due to the expansion of its training programs and the consolidation of its facilities, in 2002, MGPI was renamed a university. The university now boasted 30 departments and 15 research laboratories, with 22 doctors of science and 128 candidates of science. During this period, new educational programs were launched within the two-tier education system under the Bologna Agreement (undergraduate and graduate), and the university began offering postgraduate programs in 10 scientific specialties.

The first interregional Center for Special Education in Northwest Russia was established at MGPU.

Exchanges of student and faculty delegations with universities in the Netherlands, Finland, Norway, Sweden, and the United States began. As part of its international activities, MGPU also hosted the French Resource Center, the Center for German Literature, the Barents Club, and a branch of the UNESCO Department of the Herzen State Pedagogical University of Russia.

=== Murmansk State Humanitarian University (2010–2015) ===
Due to its emergence as a leading center for humanities research in the Murmansk region, the university was renamed from a pedagogical university to a humanities university. The university employed 28 doctors of science and professors and 116 candidates of science and associate professors.

In 2013, 13 educational programs at MGHU were ranked among the best in Russia according to the All-Russian competition "Best Educational Programs of Innovative Russia."

MGHU began to collaborate more closely with foreign universities in the fields of northern studies, philosophy, social work, and design, implementing joint educational, scientific, and social projects.

=== Murmansk Arctic State University (2015-2023) ===
In 2015, the university was renamed from a humanities university to an Arctic university. This led to the university acquiring two additional campuses in Kirovsk (formerly the Khibiny Technical College) and Apatity (formerly a branch of Petrozavodsk State University). Furthermore, in 2017, the university was awarded flagship status.

During this same period, the university implemented a number of strategic projects, participated in the formation of economic clusters for the development of the region (a mining, chemical and metallurgical cluster, a transport and logistics cluster, a tourism and recreation cluster, a northern design cluster), together with the Kola Science Center of the Russian Academy of Sciences created an information and analytical platform (engaged in expert information and analytical activities in some sectors of the Arctic economy), and also opened an educational program in the medical field for the first time.

=== Murmansk State Technical University ===
Murmansk State Technical University was founded in 1950 as the Murmansk Higher Maritime School, which was renamed the Murmansk Higher Marine Engineering School in 1969. In 1975, the school was named after the Lenin Komsomol. In 1992, it was renamed the Murmansk State Academy of the Fishing Fleet. In 1996, the university was renamed Murmansk State Technical University.

=== Merger ===
On September 23, 2022, a decision was made to merge the two largest universities in the Murmansk region. In 2023, it merged with Murmansk Arctic State University (formerly a pedagogical university founded in 1939) and received its current name. It is expected that the new unified university will be focused as much as possible on the Arctic agenda, and its educational courses will be based on research programs.

== Faculties ==
Today Murmansk Arctic University comprises three faculties, four institutes and the Marine Academy. Mesiatsev Murmansk Marine Fishing College and Arkhangelsk Fishing Technical College count as branches of MSTU (together with branches in Poliarnyi and Apatity).

- The Marine Academy
  (including the Faculty of Advanced Training for the Fleet Commanding Staff)
- The Faculty of Arctic Technologies
- The Faculty of Part-Time Education
- The Faculty of Social and Economic Studies (part-time programs)
- The Institute of Natural Science and Technology
- The Institute of Economics, Management and Law
- The Institute of Distance Learning
- The Further Professional Education Institute

== International collaboration ==
The university is a member of the University of the Arctic. UArctic is an international cooperative network based in the Circumpolar Arctic region, consisting of more than 200 universities, colleges, and other organizations with an interest in promoting education and research in the Arctic region. The collaboration has been paused after the beginning of the Russo-Ukrainian War in 2022.
