= Conrad Carlsrud =

Norwegian gymnast (1884–1973)

- Full name: Conrad Marentius Carlsrud
- Born: 9 February 1884 Kjose, United Kingdoms of Sweden and Norway
- Died: 21 October 1973 (aged 89) Waterbury, Connecticut, US

Gymnastics career
- Discipline: Men's artistic gymnastics
- Country represented: Norway
- Club: Idrettsforeningen Urædd
Medal record
Men's artistic gymnastics
Representing Norway
Olympic Games
Silver medal – second place	1908 London	Team
Intercalated Games
Gold medal – first place	1906 Athens	Team

Conrad Marentius Carlsrud (9 February 1884 – 21 October 1973) was a Norwegian gymnast and track and field athlete who competed in the 1906 Intercalated Games and in the 1908 Summer Olympics.

At the 1906 Intercalated Games in Athens, he was a member of the Norwegian gymnastics team, which won the gold medal in the team, Swedish system event. Two years later, he won the silver medal as part of the Norwegian team in the gymnastics team event. His result in the individual competition is unknown.

He also participated in javelin throw. In 1906 he finished eighth in the javelin competition. Two years later he competed in the freestyle javelin event but his result is unknown.
