= Per Mathias Jespersen =

Norwegian gymnast

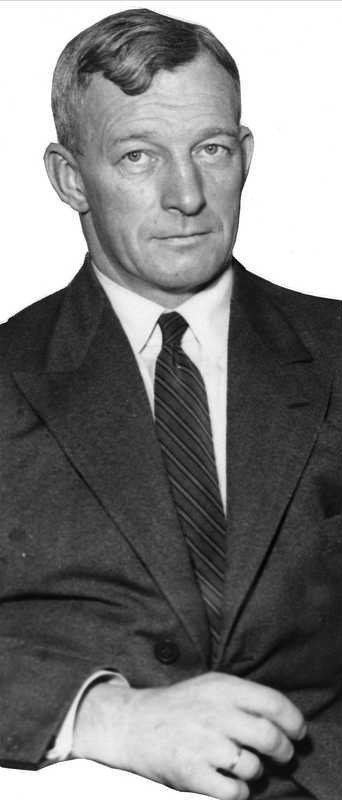
- Jespersen c. 1930

Personal information
- Born: 29 March 1888 Skien, United Kingdoms of Sweden and Norway
- Died: 13 July 1964 (aged 76) Oslo, Norway

Gymnastics career
- Discipline: Men's artistic gymnastics
- Country represented: Norway
- Club: Odds Ballklubb
Medal record
Men's artistic gymnastics
Representing Norway
Olympic Games
Silver medal – second place	1908 London	Team
Intercalated Games
Gold medal – first place	1906 Athens	Team

Per Mathias Jespersen (29 March 1888 – 13 July 1964) was a Norwegian gymnast who competed in the 1906 Intercalated Games and in the 1908 Summer Olympics. He was born in Skien. He was married to Anna Johnsen, and they were the parents of Finn Varde Jespersen.

At the 1906 Intercalated Games in Athens, he was a member of the Norwegian gymnastics team, which won the gold medal in the team, Swedish system event.

Two years later, he won the silver medal as part of the Norwegian team in the gymnastics team event.

He died in Oslo.
