= Ernest Nixson =

British wrestler

Personal information
- Nationality: British
- Born: 25 May 1886 Hammersmith, Greater London, England
- Died: 23 February 1971 (aged 84) Hammersmith, Greater London, England

Sport
- Sport: Wrestling

Ernest Edgar Nixson (25 May 1886 – 23 February 1971) was a British wrestler. He competed in the men's Greco-Roman light heavyweight at the 1908 Summer Olympics.
