= Eric Lemming =

Swedish athlete

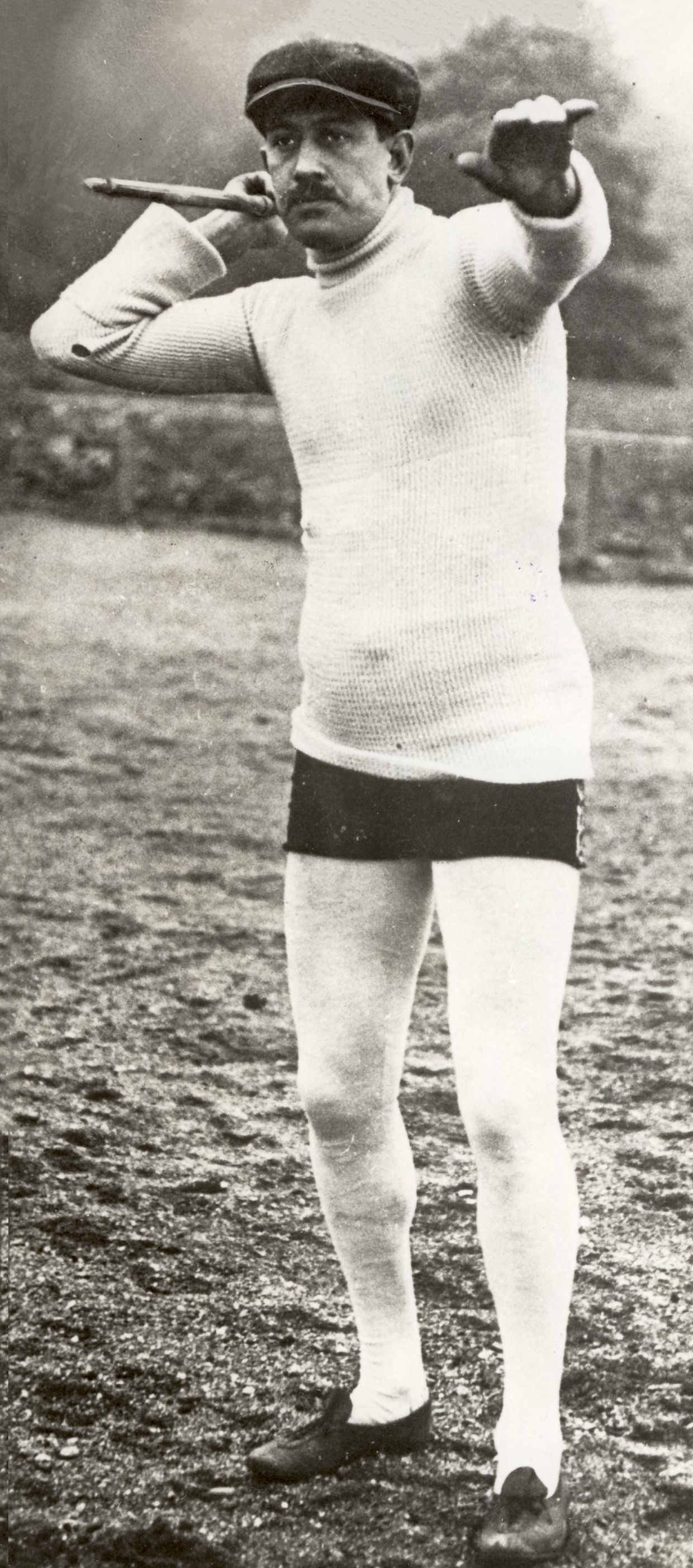

Personal information
- Full name: Eric Otto Valdemar Lemming
- Born: 22 February 1880 Gothenburg, Sweden
- Died: 5 June 1930 (aged 50) Gothenburg, Sweden
- Height: 1.90 m (6 ft 3 in)
- Weight: 88 kg (194 lb)

Sport
- Sport: Athletics
- Events: Jumping, throwing
- Club: IS Lyckans Soldater, Göteborg; Göteborgs IF

Achievements and titles
- Personal bests: HJ – 1.70 m (1900); PV – 3.20 m (1900); LJ – 6.34 m (1906); TJ – 12.72 m (1903); SP – 13.10 m (1918); DT – 44.90 m (1917); HT – 46.84 m (1917); JT – 62.32 m (1912)
Medal record
Representing Sweden
Intercalated Games
Gold medal – first place	1906 Athens	Javelin throw
Bronze medal – third place	1906 Athens	Shot put
Bronze medal – third place	1906 Athens	Pentathlon
Bronze medal – third place	1906 Athens	Tug of war
Olympic Games
Gold medal – first place	1908 London	Freestyle javelin
Gold medal – first place	1908 London	Javelin throw
Gold medal – first place	1912 Stockholm	Javelin throw

Eric Otto Valdemar Lemming (22 February 1880 – 5 June 1930) was a Swedish track and field athlete who competed at the 1900, 1906, 1908 and 1912 Olympics in a wide variety of events, which mostly involved throwing and jumping. He had his best results in the javelin throw, which he won at the 1906–1912 Games, and in which he set multiple world records between 1899 and 1912. His last record, measured at 62.32 m, was ratified by the International Association of Athletics Federations as the first official world record.

Javelin throw was not part of the 1900 Olympics, where Lemming finished fourth in the hammer throw, high jump and pole vault. At the 1906 Intercalated Games he won a gold medal in the javelin throw and three bronze medals, in the shot put, tug of war and ancient pentathlon, which consisted of a standing long jump, discus throw (ancient style), javelin throw, 192 m run, and a Greco-Roman wrestling match. He also finished fourth in the discus throw and stone throwing contests.

At the 1908 Olympics, Lemming won two gold medals in two types of javelin throw, and finished eighth in the hammer throw. He won another gold medal in the javelin at his last Olympics in 1912, where his half-brother Oscar placed tenth in pentathlon. Lemming died on 5 June 1930 at the age of 50.
