= Julius Braathe =

Norwegian sport shooter (1877–1914)

Personal information
- Born: 4 May 1874 Trøgstad, Norway
- Died: 18 July 1914 (aged 40) Kolbotn, Norway

Sport
- Sport: Sports shooting
Medal record
Men's shooting
Representing Norway
Olympic Games
Gold medal – first place	1908 London	Team free rifle
Intercalated Games
Silver medal – second place	1906 Athens	Team rifle, standing

Julius "Jul" Braathe (4 March 1877 – 8 July 1914) was a Norwegian rifle shooter who competed in the early 20th century. Braathe won the gold medal with the Norwegian 300 metre free rifle team at the 1908 Summer Olympics in London. He also competed at the 1906 Intercalated Games and the 1912 Summer Olympics. He died in a drowning accident, 37 years old.
