= Irish Whales =

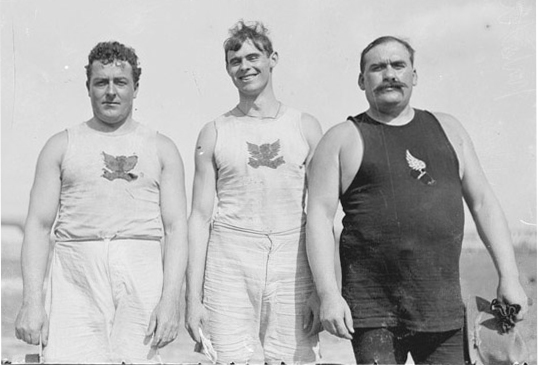
Irish Whales: John Flanagan and Martin Sheridan of the Irish American Athletic Club, with fellow Irishman James Mitchell of the New York Athletic Club at the 1904 Olympic Games in St. Louis, Missouri.

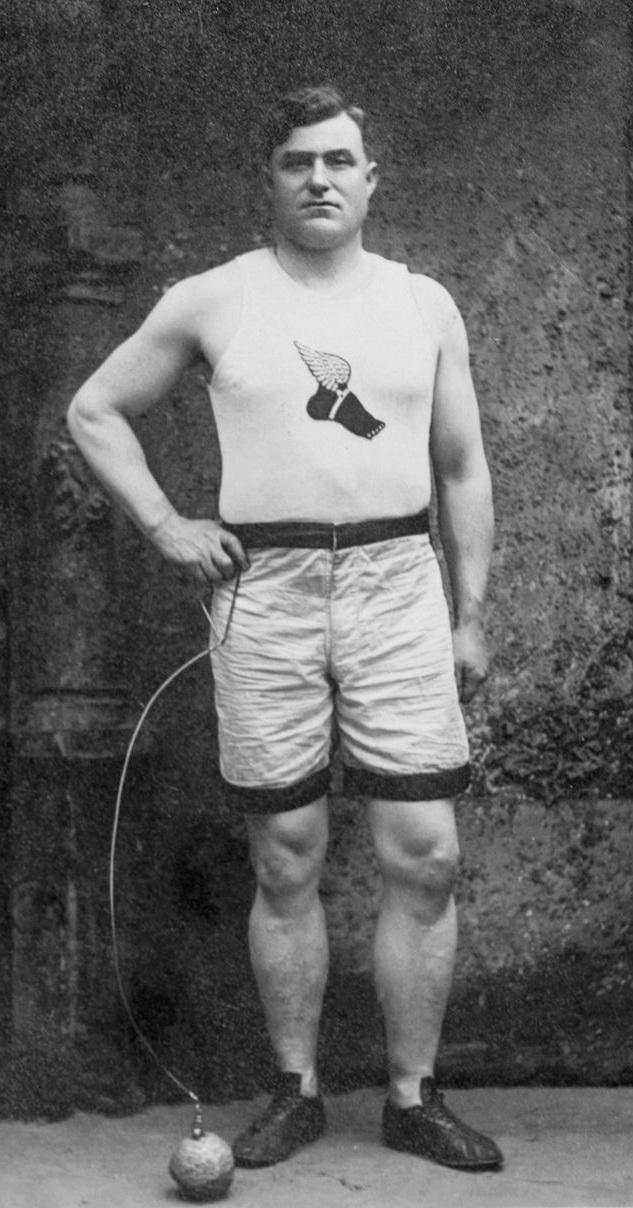
Simon Gillis in 1912.

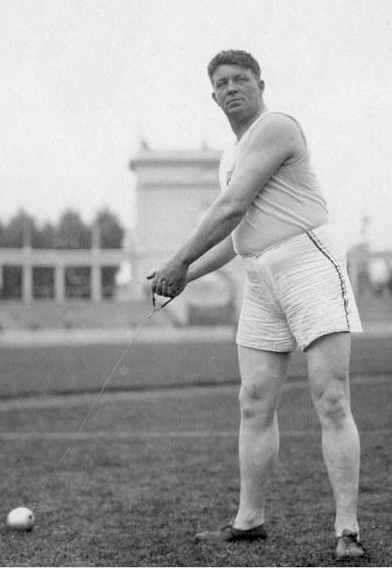
Paddy Ryan at the 1920 Games.

The Irish Whales or "The Whales" was a nickname given to a group of Irish, Irish-American and Irish-Canadian athletes who dominated weight-throwing events in the first two decades of the 20th century. "This group dominated the field events, particularly throwing events, at the Amateur Athletic Union national championships and at the Olympic Games between 1896 and 1924." They were primarily members of the Irish American Athletic Club, and the New York Athletic Club and also members of the New York City Police Department. They were known as such because of their athletic prowess, physical size, voracious appetites, and their impact on a generation of sports fans.

The Irish Whales included; John Flanagan, Simon Gillis, James Mitchell, Pat McDonald, Paddy Ryan, Martin Sheridan, Matt McGrath and Con Walsh. What Sheridan lacked in girth, he made up for with his appetite and athletic accomplishments, nine Olympic medals in all. "Matt McGrath was built like a wedge. He was a six-footer, but he weighed 248 pounds. John Flanagan was about the same. Simon Gillis was 6′2″ and 240. Paddy Ryan was 6′5″ and 296, while Pat McDonald was 6′5″ and 300 pounds."

== Origin ==
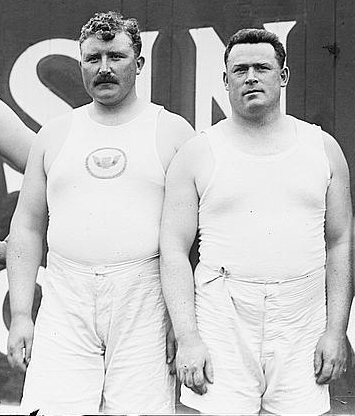
Irish Whales: Pat McDonald and Matt McGrath of the Irish American Athletic Club, posing for a 1912 U.S. Olympic team photo.

While it is not entirely clear when this moniker came into use, and was likely not used in the face of any of these giant men, it seems to have first appeared in print in 1937 in John Kieran's New York Times column, "Sports of the Times", written by John Drebinger (who was substituting for Kieran). The term was further popularized in "Sports of the Times" columns written by Arthur Daly in the New York Times, with the first reference to "The Whales" in 1942. On the subject of the origin of this nickname, Daly wrote:

"It was on the Olympic trip of 1912 that the 'whale' nickname took hold. Dan Ferris, then a cherubic little boy, recalls it with relish. 'Those big fellows,' he related, 'all sat at the same table and their waiter was a small chap. Before we reached Stockholm he had lost twenty pounds, worn down by bringing them food. Once as he passed me he muttered under his breath, 'It's whales they are, not men.' They used to take five plates of soup as a starter and then gulp down three or four steaks with trimmings. That Simon Gillis would think nothing of having a dozen eggs for breakfast. But what fascinated me was the way he ate them. He'd put a dab of mustard on each and eat it whole, shell and all.' The Irish American A.C. behemoths always were the life of any party."

Another tale of the Irish Whales' voracious appetites came from Arthur Daly's typewriter twenty-two years later. In a Times column in 1964 he wrote:

"Some of their more prodigious feats were at the table. The Irish American A.C. was competing in Baltimore when (Simon) Gillis placed an order for a post-meet snack with the head waiter at a local restaurant. He ordered 27 dozen oysters and six huge T-bone steaks. Slight Miscalculation - The waiter was ready when Gillis, McDonald and McGrath arrived. The table had been set for a party of 33. 'Do you want to wait for the rest of your group?' asked the headwaiter. He turned pale as he watched three whales devour 27 dozen oysters and six huge T-bone steaks."

== Summary table ==
Heights and weights are taken from various reference sources; heights given sometimes vary by several inches, while, obviously, weight can fluctuate substantially over an athlete's career. All Olympic medals won were for the United States, except for Con Walsh's which was for Canada. The 1906 Intercalated Games were considered an Olympic event at the time, but are not now counted among official Olympic Games.

Name	Birth	Death	Height	Weight	Olympic medals
John Flanagan	January 28, 1868; County Limerick	June 3, 1938; Limerick	6 ft 0 in (1.83 m)	248 pounds (112 kg)	1900 Paris — Hammer throw 1904 St. Louis — Hammer throw 1904 St. Louis — 56 pound weight throw 1908 London — Hammer throw
Simon Gillis	April 6, 1875; Cape Breton Island	January 14, 1964; Phoenix, Arizona	6 ft 1 in (1.85 m)	241 pounds (109 kg)	none
James Mitchel	January 30, 1864; Bartoose, County Tipperary	July 3, 1921; Limerick	6 ft 1.5 in (1.87 m)	220 pounds (100 kg)	1904 St Louis — 56 pound weight throw
Pat McDonald	July 26, 1878; Killard, County Clare	May 16, 1954; New York City	6 ft 2.5 in (1.89 m)	265 pounds (120 kg)	1912 Stockholm — Shot put 1912 Stockholm — Two-handed shot put 1920 Antwerp — 56 pound weight throw
Paddy Ryan	20 January 1883; Bunavoy, Pallasgreen	13 February 1964; Limerick	6 ft 2 in (1.88 m)	249 pounds (113 kg)	1920 Antwerp — Hammer throw 1920 Antwerp — 56 lb weight throw
Martin Sheridan	March 28, 1881; Bohola	March 27, 1918; New York City	6 ft 3 in (1.91 m)	194 pounds (88 kg)	1904 St Louis — Discus; 1906 Athens — Discus; 1906 Athens — Shot put 1906 Athens — Standing high jump 1906 Athens — Standing long jump 1906 Athens — Stone throw 1908 London — Discus; 1908 London — Greek discus 1908 London — Standing long jump
Matt McGrath	December 28, 1875; Nenagh	January 29, 1941; New York City	6 ft 0 in (1.83 m)	254 pounds (115 kg)	1908 London — Hammer throw 1912 Stockholm — Hammer throw 1924 Paris — Hammer throw
Con Walsh	April 24, 1885; Carriganimma, County Cork	December 7, 1961; Seattle, Washington	6 ft 4 in (1.93 m)	210 pounds (95 kg)	Competing for Canada 1908 London — Hammer throw

== See also ==
- Irish American Athletic Club
