= Weight throw at the Olympics =

Sport at the Olympics games

Weight throw at the Olympic Games

Overview
- Sport: Athletics
- Gender: Men

Olympic record
- Men: 11.265 m Pat McDonald; United States

The weight throw at the Summer Olympics was contested at the multi-sport event in 1904 and 1920. Part of the Olympic athletics programme, it was the fourth track and field throwing event to be contested at the Olympics, after the shot put, discus throw and hammer throw. The latter three events, along with the javelin throw (introduced in 1908), are now the only four throwing events on the Olympic programme. Only men competed in the two years that the event was held.

Both competitions used the standard 56 pounds (25 kg) implement used in the United States. International participation was limited in the event which was mainly practised in North America. Five of the six entrants in the 1904 St. Louis Olympics were American, but Canadian Étienne Desmarteau topped the podium. Given the lack of interest from other nations, the event was dropped for the next Olympics. It was revived once more for the 1920 Summer Olympics, held in Antwerp, and Swedish and Finnish throwers joined the American team and sole Canadian Archie McDiarmid at that competition. Pat McDonald, the oldest entrant at age 41, won the gold medal for the United States. His winning mark of 11.265 m (36 ft 11 1/2 in) remains the best achieved for the event in Olympic competition.

The weight throw was again dropped from the programme after 1920 and has not since gained wide participation in track and field events beyond North America.

== Medal summary ==
Games	Gold	Silver	Bronze
1904 St. Louis	Étienne Desmarteau; Canada	John Flanagan; United States	James Mitchell; United States
1908–1912	not included in the Olympic program		
1920 Antwerp	Pat McDonald; United States	Patrick Ryan; United States	Carl Johan Lind; Sweden

=== Medals by country ===
Rank	Nation	Gold	Silver	Bronze	Total
1	United States	1	2	1	4
2	Canada	1	0	0	1
3	Sweden	0	0	1	1
