= Ethan Katzberg =

Canadian hammer thrower (born 2002)

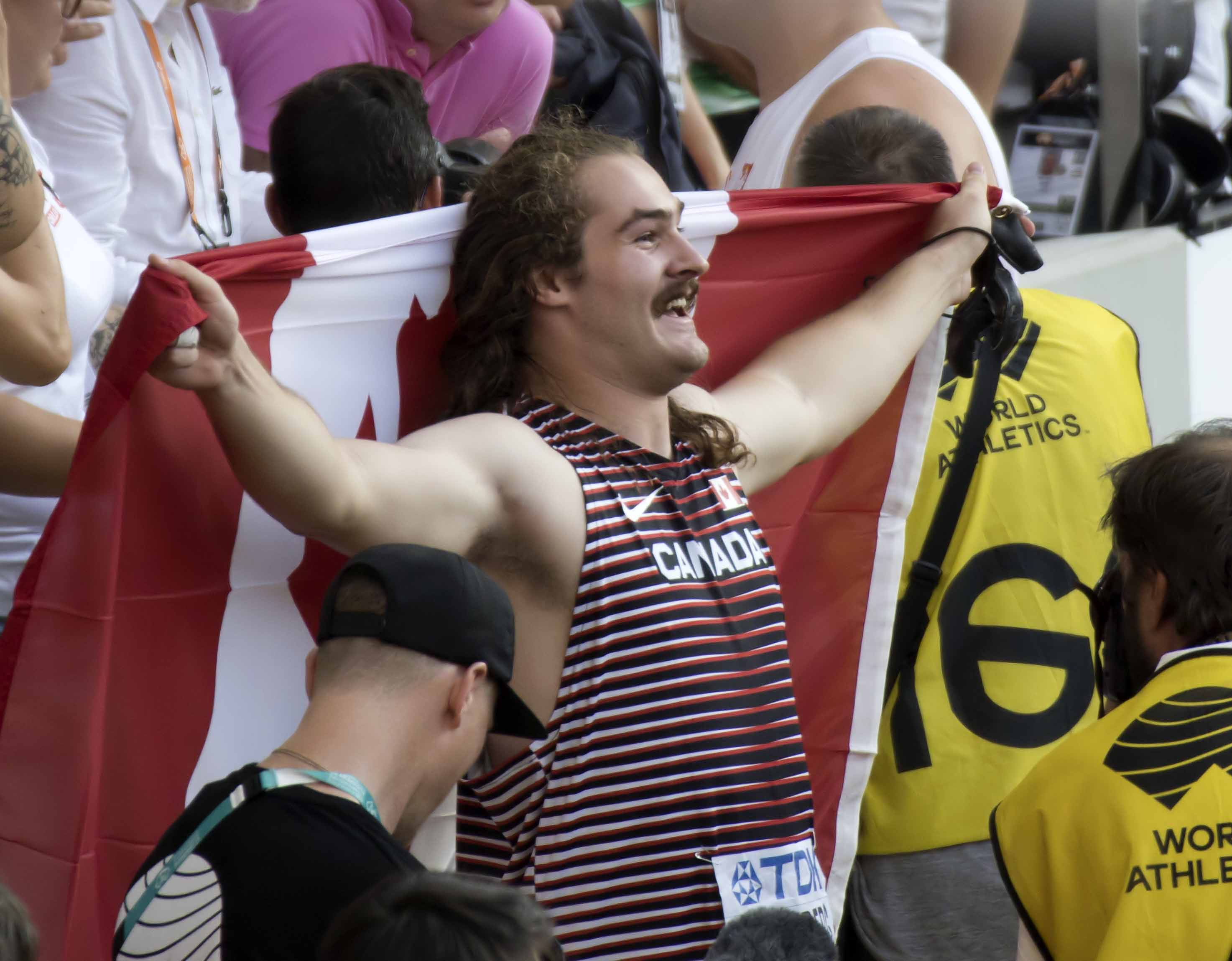
- Katzberg in 2023

Personal information
- Born: April 5, 2002 (age 24) Nanaimo, British Columbia, Canada
- Height: 201 cm (6 ft 7 in)
- Weight: 107 kg (236 lb)

Sport
- Country: Canada
- Sport: Track and field
- Event: Hammer throw
- Coached by: Dylan Armstrong; Bernie Katzberg

Achievements and titles
- Personal bests: 84.70 m (277 ft 10 1/2 in) NR, AR (Tokyo 2025)
Medal record
Men's athletics
Representing Canada
Olympic Games
Gold medal – first place	2024 Paris	Hammer throw
World Championships
Gold medal – first place	2023 Budapest	Hammer throw
Gold medal – first place	2025 Tokyo	Hammer throw
Commonwealth Games
Gold medal – first place	2026 Glasgow	Hammer throw
Silver medal – second place	2022 Birmingham	Hammer throw
Pan American Games
Gold medal – first place	2023 Santiago	Hammer throw

Ethan Katzberg (born April 5, 2002) is a Canadian hammer thrower. He is the 2024 Olympic champion and a two-time World champion (2023, 2025) in that discipline, as well as the 2023 Pan American champion and the 2026 Commonwealth Games gold medallist.

== Career ==
Katzberg started throwing hammer at the age of 14 after watching his father coach his sister in the event, thinking it looked fun. He initially trained at the Nanaimo Track and Field Club. Following high school he moved to Kamloops to be trained by new coach Dylan Armstrong, a former Olympic shot put medallist. Armstrong said of the new talent then that he was "a skinny basketball player when I got him. What really stuck out, obviously, was his height and his speed. That’s a rare combination. It’s hard to find a fast, tall, co-ordinated guy that may have some interest in throwing — they all go to basketball, football or other sports."

Making his major international tournament debut at the 2021 World Athletics U20 Championships, Katzberg qualified to the hammer throw final but finished last with no valid throws. He won a silver medal in the hammer throw event at the 2022 Commonwealth Games.

Katzberg enjoyed early success on the international competitive circuit in 2023, notably winning gold when the Diamond League held a promotional mixed-gender hammer throw event at the 2023 Meeting de Paris. He won his first Canadian national title months later. Competing in his first world championships in Budapest at the 2023 World Athletics Championships, Katzberg qualified for the finals with the best throw and a national record of 81.18 m (266 ft 4 in). He threw an 81.25 m (266 ft 6 3/4 in) on his fifth throw, setting another new national record and winning the gold medal and world title. Katzberg's victory made him both the youngest ever men's hammer throw medallist and world champion, and the first Canadian man to win a medal in the event. His victory ended the reign of five-time world champion Paweł Fajdek, who finished fourth, while he also defeated Wojciech Nowicki, the reigning Olympic champion. Katzberg was part of a Canadian sweep of the hammer events in Budapest, along with Camryn Rogers' victory in the women's event.

Following the World Championships, Katzberg concluded the year as part of the Canadian team for the 2023 Pan American Games, where he won the gold medal. His winning distance of 80.96 m set a new Games record.

To start his 2024 season, Katzberg threw 84.38 m on April 20 at the Kip Keino Classic in Nairobi, Kenya, a new Canadian and NACAC area record the longest hammer throw by anyone since 2008, moving him to ninth on the all-time list. Named to his first Canadian Olympic team, Katzberg entered the hammer throw event as the title favourite, and finished first in the qualification round. With his opening throw of the final he managed a distance of 84.12 metres, just shy of the Olympic record of 84.80 metres. He was the only competitor in the event to throw above 80 metres, and took the gold medal by a 4.15-metre margin over Hungarian silver medalist Bence Halász. This was the first hammer throw medal for a Canadian since Duncan Gillis' silver in 1912, and the first gold medal for a Canadian in a throwing event since Étienne Desmarteau won the now-discontinued weight throw in 1904. With Rogers' subsequently claiming victory in the women's event, Canada swept the hammer throw at a second major championship. Shortly after his victory, Katzberg traveled to attend a training camp in Slovakia, but returned to Paris a few days later upon being named Canada's co-flagbearer at the closing ceremony, alongside triple gold medalist swimmer Summer McIntosh. At the end of the year, Katzberg received the Lionel Conacher Award as The Canadian Press' choice for the nation's top male athlete of 2024.

Katzberg won his first five competitions of the 2025 athletic season, before finishing second to American Rudy Winkler at the 2025 Prefontaine Classic and then to Halász in consecutive international meets. At the 2025 World Athletics Championships in Tokyo, Katzberg successfully defended his title in the hammer throw event, taking the gold medal with a winning throw of 84.70 m. This set a new championship best, breaking the 18-year-old record set by Ivan Tsikhan in 2007, and was the longest throw in any competition in 20 years. With Rogers already victorious in the women's event, this was the third consecutive global championship double in the hammer for the two Canadians.

In 2026, Katzberg set a games record on his first attempt at Scotstoun Stadium in the 2026 Commonwealth Games with a throw of 80.97 metres, moving one step up the podium after claiming Commonwealth silver in 2022. His throw was four metres further than silver medallist Iosif Kesidis of Cyprus who threw 76.97 metres and Rowan Hamilton of Chilliwack won bronze with a 75.36 metre throw.

== Personal life ==
Katzberg is originally from Nanaimo, British Columbia, and moved to Kamloops after highschool to train at the Kamloops Track and Field Club.

== Personal bests ==
- Hammer throw – 84.70 m (277 ft 10 1/2 in) NR AR (Tokyo 2025)

== International competitions ==
Representing Canada
Year	Competition	Venue	Position	Event	Result
2021	World U20 Championships	Kasarani, Kenya	–	Hammer throw	NM
2022	Commonwealth Games	Birmingham, England	2nd	Hammer throw	76.36 m
2023	World Championships	Budapest, Hungary	1st	Hammer throw	81.25 m
2023	Pan American Games	Santiago, Chile	1st	Hammer throw	80.96 m
2024	Olympic Games	Paris, France	1st	Hammer throw	84.12 m
2025	World Championships	Tokyo, Japan	1st	Hammer throw	84.70 m
2026	Commonwealth Games	Glasgow, Scotland	1st	Hammer throw	80.97 m
2026	World Ultimate Championship	Budapest, Hungary	−	Hammer throw	NM
