= Benjamin Sherman =

Benjamin Sherman may refer to:

- Benjamin Sherman (Wisconsin politician) (1836–1915), member of the Wisconsin State Assembly and the Wisconsin State Senate
- Benjamin Sherman (Michigan politician) (1792–1872), member of the Michigan House of Representatives
- Benjamin Sherman (hammer thrower) (1881–?), American Olympic hammer thrower

== See also ==
- Ben Sherman, a British clothing brand
