= American Invasion Tour =

1888 sports tour

The American Invasion (called the Irish Invasion in America) was an 1888 sports tour of the Northeastern United States by Irish athletes under the auspices of the Gaelic Athletic Association (GAA). It raised American awareness of the GAA but failed as a fundraising venture.

== Planning ==
In endorsing the 1884 founding of the GAA, its patron Michael Davitt called for a modern revival of the ancient Tailteann Games. In January 1888 the annual GAA Congress was held in an atmosphere of optimism after the successful organisation of the 1887 All-Ireland Hurling and All-Ireland Football Championships and a détente between factions for and against the Irish Republican Brotherhood (IRB). Congress agreed in principle to organise a tour of North America, hoping to publicise Gaelic games among the Irish diaspora there and to raise funds for its Tailteann Games project. Details were arranged at April, May, and July meetings of the GAA Central Council. A cost of £1,000 was estimated, with a projected £5,000 in receipts, which proved very overoptimistic. The tour was to include exhibition matches in hurling and challenge matches in track and field athletics, a sport which the GAA organised until the 1922 foundation of the National Athletic and Cycling Association. Gaelic football, now the most popular Gaelic game, was less important in the early GAA and not included in the tour.

The tour was delayed by difficulty in raising the necessary £1,000, with patron Thomas Croke contributing only £5, and little raised by exhibition games in Dublin, Wexford, Dundalk, Kilkenny, Tipperary and Cork. Requesting a donation from each affiliated club was hampered by continued disaffiliations dating from the IRB split. Finally, Davitt personally guaranteed £450. The track and field athletes were selected from among the top finishers at the GAA national championships in Limerick on 5 August. Daniel Bulger of Lansdowne Football Club won four events, but was ineligible for the tour because his club was affiliated to the Irish Rugby Football Union rather than the GAA. John Cullinan, an official of the GAA and IRB, went ahead to America to prepare for the tour party, which set sail on 16 September from Queenstown (now Cobh) on the Guion Line's Wisconsin. The team comprised 18 track and field athletes, 25 hurlers, and 10 officials including a doctor and a Catholic chaplain. (Some of the party were in two categories, like Maurice Davin's brother Pat; the total number is variously given as 51 or 53.) Patrick Prendergast Sutton travelled both as captain of one of the two hurling teams and as correspondent of Sport.

== Progression ==
External image
- Photograph of the 'Invasion' team

Many of the hurlers were seasick throughout the voyage. The tour included New York City and Patterson in New York; Boston and Lowell in Massachusetts; Trenton and Newark in New Jersey; Providence, Rhode Island; and Philadelphia. Arriving in each city, the party were greeted by pipe and brass bands. The field athletes set records and the hurlers impressed the locals. A spectator was injured by a wayward hammer during the first practice session. Hurling matches were 13-a-side. All the hurleys the party had brought were soon broken and replacements were quickly made from local hickory rather than the traditional ash wood.

At the national championships of the National Association of Amateur Athletes of America (NAAA) in the Manhattan Athletic Club on 13 October, James Mitchel came first in the 56 pound weight and second in both the shot put and hammer throw; other GAA athletes came first in the 440-yard dash (Timothy Jerome O'Mahony, the "Rosscarbery Steam Engine") and high jump (Tim M. O'Connor); second in the mile run (William McCarthy, beaten by Thomas Conneff, who had emigrated the previous year); and third in the 120-yard hurdles (Denis Power), half-mile run (Billy Phibbs) and long jump (Daniel Shanahan). Among the other GAA athletes were John Mooney (sprints); Patrick Keohan, Pat Looney, and Jack Connery (jumps); and William Real and John C. Daly (throws).

Several factors reduced both the number of meetings (to 15 hurling and 9 athletics matches) and attendances at them: bad weather; the U.S. presidential election campaign, which preoccupied the GAA's Tammany Hall sympathisers; and a dispute between the older NAAA and the larger Amateur Athletic Union (AAU). The GAA tried to be neutral between the AAU and the NAAA, leading the AAU to boycott it. Heavy snow cancelled the two-week Canadian leg of the tour. Local journalist Patrick Ford was called upon to pay the party's hotel bill in New York City. Although the final meeting at Madison Square Garden attracted a crowd of several thousand, the local organisers charged the Irish party $75 to cover an alleged shortfall in expenses.

When S.S. City of Rome left New York on 31 October, many of the players opted not to sail back to Ireland. Mandle says 28 of the 45 athletes returned; Pat Davin said only 23 of the total party of 53 returned. Others returned only to settle their affairs before emigrating back to America. Michael Cusack privately accused Davitt of "traitorously" encouraging his "pets" to emigrate.

== Legacy ==
The tour was a financial disaster. As regards increasing awareness of Gaelic games in the United States, the tour had some success; which later benefited Gaelic football there despite its not having been part of the tour. The 1888 All-Ireland Hurling and All-Ireland Football Championships were abandoned because of the disruption of the tour. Maurice Davin resigned as GAA President at the 1889 Congress, as the IRB faction used the failure of the tour to take control of the GAA executive. In 1893 Davitt's bankruptcy declaration stated that he was still owed £450 by the GAA, which disowned the tour and its associated debt. Among those who stayed in America was James Mitchel, who won a bronze medal for the U.S. in the 1904 Olympic 56-lb weight throw. Pat Davin's diary of the tour was published as part of his 1938 memoir; the diary manuscript was sold for €5,500 at auction in 2016.

== Sources ==
- Mandle, W. F. (1987). The Gaelic Athletic Association & Irish Nationalist Politics, 1884–1924. London; Dublin: Christopher Helm; Gill & Macmillan. ISBN 978-0-7171-1509-9.
- Martin, Kevin (6 August 2020). "James "Jim" Mitchell and the Irish Invasion". The Irish Whales: Olympians of Old New York. Rowman & Littlefield. pp. 21–36. ISBN 978-1-5381-4231-8.
