= Athletics at the 1908 Summer Olympics – Men's hammer throw =

Men's hammer throw at the Games of the IV Olympiad
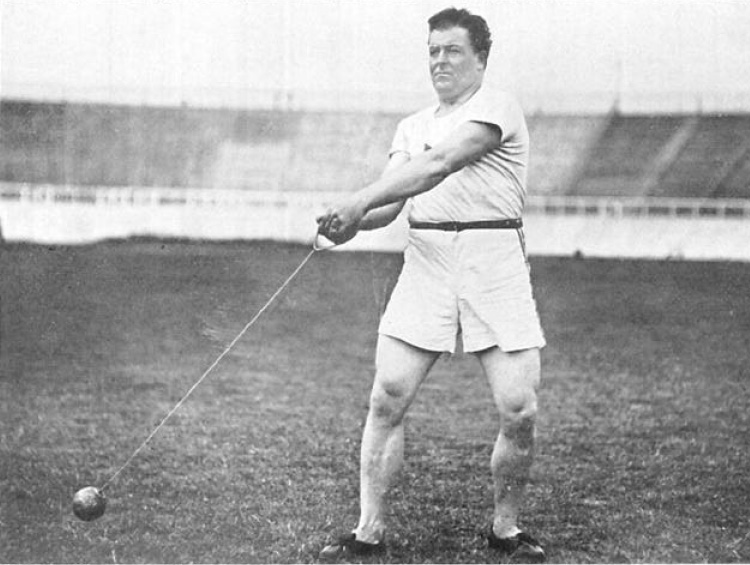
- The winner John Flanagan
- Venue: White City Stadium
- Date: July 14, 1908
- Competitors: 19 from 8 nations
- Winning distance: 51.92 OR

Medalists
| 1st place, gold medalist(s) | | John Flanagan; United States |
| 2nd place, silver medalist(s) | | Matt McGrath; United States |
| 3rd place, bronze medalist(s) | | Con Walsh; Canada |

The men's hammer throw was one of six throwing events on the Athletics at the 1908 Summer Olympics programme in London. The competition was held on July 14, 1908. 19 throwers from eight nations competed. NOCs could enter up to 12 athletes. The event was won by American John Flanagan, his third consecutive victory in the event. He was the first man to win three medals in the hammer throw and, as of the 2016 Games, the only one to win three gold medals in the event. The silver medal went to fellow American Matt McGrath. Con Walsh of Canada took bronze and became the first athlete not from the United States to win a medal in the event, as the Americans had swept the podium in both 1900 and 1904. The three medalists were all part of the Irish Whales.

== Background ==
This was the third appearance of the event, which has been held at every Summer Olympics except 1896. American John Flanagan was the two-time defending Olympic champion, was a seven-time AAU champion, and had also won national titles in Great Britain and Ireland; he was the favorite. Fellow American Matt McGrath was rising as a challenger, however, and had taken second place in the 1907 AAU championship. McGrath was struggling with a knee injury but still hoped to supplant the 40-year-old Flanagan as the premier hammer thrower of the day.

Canada, Denmark, Germany, Great Britain, Hungary, and Switzerland each made their debut in the event. The United States appeared for the third time, the only nation to have competed at each appearance of the event to that point.

== Competition format ==
The competition introduced a single, divided-final format. Each athlete received three throws, with the top three receiving an additional three throws. The hammer's total length could not be more than four feet. The weight of the hammer was 16 pounds. There were no other restrictions on the size or shape of the hammer. The throwing circle was seven feet in diameter. There were no restrictions on the throwing form.

== Records ==
These were the standing world and Olympic records (in metres) prior to this competition.

| World record | John Flanagan (USA) | 53.38^{*} | Torrington, United States | 20 June 1908 |
| Olympic record | John Flanagan (USA) | 51.23 | St. Louis, United States | 29 August 1904 |

^{*} unofficial

John Flanagan set a new Olympic record with 51.92 metres.

== Schedule ==
| Date | Time | Round |
|---|---|---|
| Tuesday, 14 July 1908 | 10:00 | Qualifying; Final |

== Results ==
| Rank | Athlete | Nation | Distance | Notes |
|---|---|---|---|---|
| 1st place, gold medalist(s) | John Flanagan | United States | 51.92 | OR |
| 2nd place, silver medalist(s) | Matt McGrath | United States | 51.18 | |
| 3rd place, bronze medalist(s) | Con Walsh | Canada | 48.51 | |
| 4 | Tom Nicolson | Great Britain | 48.09 | |
| 5 | Lee Talbott | United States | 47.86 | |
| 6 | Bill Horr | United States | 46.94 | |
| 7 | Simon Gillis | United States | 45.59 | |
| 8 | Eric Lemming | Sweden | 43.06 | |
| 9 | Alan Fyffe | Great Britain | 37.35 | |
| 10–19 | Harald Agger | Denmark | Unknown | |
| 10–19 | István Mudin | Hungary | Unknown | |
| 10–19 | Henry Leeke | Great Britain | Unknown | |
| 10–19 | Robert Lindsay-Watson | Great Britain | Unknown | |
| 10–19 | Ernest May | Great Britain | Unknown | |
| 10–19 | John Murray | Great Britain | Unknown | |
| 10–19 | Robert Olsson | Sweden | Unknown | |
| 10–19 | Benjamin Sherman | United States | Unknown | |
| 10–19 | Ludwig Uettwiller | Germany | Unknown | |
| 10–19 | Julius Wagner | Switzerland | Unknown | |

== Sources ==
- Official Report of the Games of the IV Olympiad (1908).
- De Wael, Herman. Herman's Full Olympians: "Athletics 1908". Accessed 7 April 2006. Available electronically at.
