= Ernest May =

Ernest May may refer to:

- Ernest May (athlete) (1878–1952), British track and field athlete who competed in the 1908 Summer Olympics
- Ernest R. May (1928–2009), American historian of international relations

== See also ==
- Ernst May (1886–1970), German architect and city planner
