= Nils Linde =

Swedish hammer thrower

Personal information
- Born: 18 July 1890 Gothenburg, Västra Götaland, Sweden
- Died: 17 August 1962 (aged 72) Gothenburg, Västra Götaland, Sweden

Sport
- Sport: Athletics
- Event: Hammer / Discus
- Club: Örgryte IS

Nils Harald Linde (18 July 1890 – August 17, 1962) was a Swedish track and field athlete who competed in the 1912 Summer Olympics and in the 1920 Summer Olympics.

== Career ==
Luinde was selected to represent Sweden in his home Olympics in 1912 in Stockholm. He finished seventh in the hammer throw competition and ninth in the two handed discus throw event.

The following year, he finished second behind fellow Swede Carl Johan Lind in the hammer throw event at the British 1913 AAA Championships.

Seven years later at the 1920 Olympic Games, Linde finished seventh again in the hammer throw competition and eleventh in the 56 pound weight throw event.
