= Alan Fyffe =

British athlete (1884–1939)

Personal information
- Nationality: British (English)
- Born: 30 April 1884 Kensington, Great Britain
- Died: 5 March 1939 (aged 54) Minchinhampton, Great Britain

Sport
- Sport: Athletics, cricket
- Event: Hammer throw
- Club: University of Oxford AC; Achilles Club

Alan Herbert Fyffe (30 April 1884 – 5 March 1939) was a British athlete who competed at the 1908 Summer Olympics.

== Biography ==
Fyffe was educated at University College in the University of Oxford and won his blue in 1904.

Fyffe represented Great Britain at the 1908 Summer Olympics in London, where he competed in the men's hammer throw competition, finishing in ninth place.

Fyffe finished third behind Tom Nicolson in the hammer throw event at the 1909 AAA Championships.

He also played thirteen first-class cricket matches for Oxford University Cricket Club between 1906 and 1925.

== See also ==
- List of Oxford University Cricket Club players
