= 1917 USA Outdoor Track and Field Championships =

American athletics championship event

- Dates: 31-September August (men)
- Host city: St Louis, Missouri (men)
- Venue: Francis Field (men)
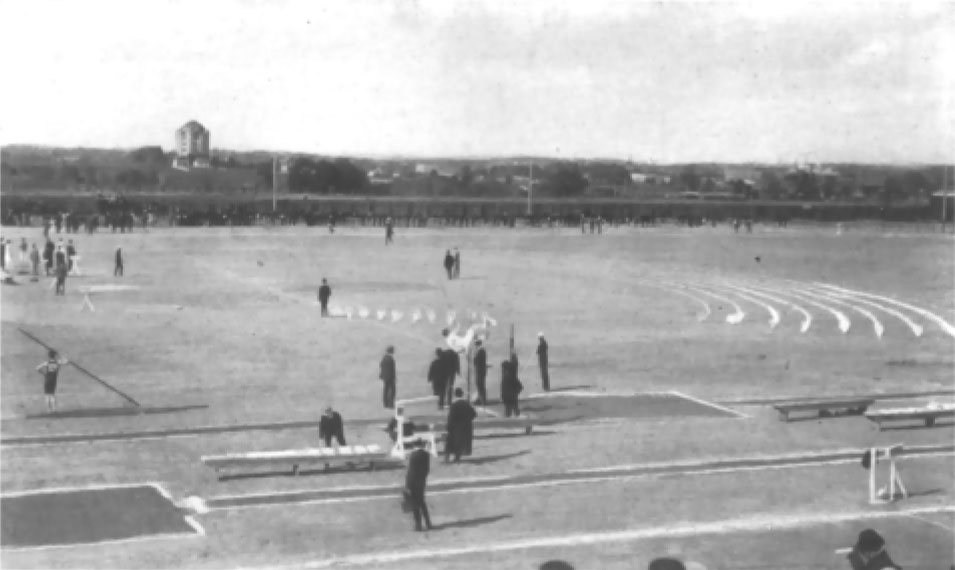

The 1917 USA Outdoor Track and Field Championships were organized by the Amateur Athletic Union (AAU) and served as the national championships in outdoor track and field for the United States.

The men's edition was held at Francis Field in St Louis, Missouri, and it took place 31-September August. The first women's championships were not held until 1923.

It was the first time the championships were held in St. Louis since the 1904 Summer Olympics at the same venue. The meet was described as underwhelming, with only two meeting records set in the mile and 440 yards hurdles.

== Results ==
Event	Gold		Silver		Bronze	
100 yards	Andrew Ward	10.2	Irving Mahl		William Hayes	
220 yards straight	Andrew Ward	22.2	Peter White	inches behind	G. W. Dernell	less than 1 yard behind 1st
440 yards	Frank Shea	49.6	G. W. Dernell		Earl Eby	
880 yards	Michael Devaney	1:57.0	John Overton	5 feet behind	Joseph Ray	
1 mile	Joseph Ray	4:18.4	Edward Fall		Clyde Stout	
5 miles	Charles Pores	26:26.4	Ville Kyrönen (FIN)		James Henigan	
120 yards hurdles	Harold Barron	15.0	Waldo Ames		Willard Savage	
440 yards hurdles	Floyd Smart	54.8	William Meanix		Walter Hummel	
High jump	Clinton Larsen	1.89 m	Charles Seibert		Walter Whalen	
Pole vault	Edward Knourek	3.88 m	Marc Wright	3.81 m	Carl Buck	3.66 m
Long jump	Joseph Irish	6.82 m	E. F. Jones		Sherman Landers	
Triple jump	Daniel Ahearn	14.53 m	Sherman Landers		Clarence Jaquith	
Shot put	Arlie Mucks	13.99 m	Lee Talbott	13.37 m	Gus Loud	13.10 m
Discus throw	Arlie Mucks	42.71 m	Avery Brundage		Lee Talbott	
Hammer throw	Patrick James Ryan	51.40 m	Lee Talbott	45.82 m	Benjamin Sherman	41.35 m
Javelin throw	George Bronder	56.12 m	James Lincoln		Milton Angier	
220 yards hurdles	Frank Loomis	24.8				
Weight throw for distance	Patrick Ryan	10.13 m				
All-around decathlon	Harry Goelitz	5702.166 pts				

== See also ==
- 1917 USA Indoor Track and Field Championships
- List of USA Outdoor Track and Field Championships winners (men)
- List of USA Outdoor Track and Field Championships winners (women)
