= Athletics at the 1920 Summer Olympics – Men's 56 pound weight throw =

Athletics at the Olympics

Men's 56 pound weight throw at the Games of the VII Olympiad
- Venue: Olympisch Stadion
- Dates: August 20–21, 1920
- Competitors: 12 from 4 nations

Medalists
1st place, gold medalist(s)		Pat McDonald	United States
2nd place, silver medalist(s)		Patrick Ryan	United States
3rd place, bronze medalist(s)		Carl Johan Lind	Sweden

The men's 56 pound weight throw event was part of the track and field athletics programme at the 1920 Summer Olympics. It was the second appearance of this event after the debut in 1904. The Intercalated Games in 1906 saw a stone throw event. The competition was held on Friday, August 20, 1920, and on Saturday, August 21, 1920.

Twelve throwers from four nations competed.

== Records ==
These were the standing world and Olympic records (in metres) prior to the 1920 Summer Olympics.

World record	M.J. McGrath (USA)	40 ft 6 1/4 in (12.35 m)	Montreal	23 September 1911
Olympic record	Étienne Desmarteau (CAN)	10.46	St. Louis (USA)	1 September 1904

Pat McDonald bettered the Olympic record in the qualification with 11.00 metres and in the final with 11.265 metres. As the competition has been discontinued, his Olympic record still stands.

== Results ==
The best six throwers qualified for the final.

Place	Athlete	Qual.		Final
Place	Athlete	Distance	Rank	Final
1	Pat McDonald (USA)	11.00	1	11.265 OR
2	Patrick Ryan (USA)	10.925	2	10.965
3	Carl Johan Lind (SWE)	10.255	3	10.255
4	Archie McDiarmid (CAN)	9.475	4	10.12
5	Malcolm Svensson (SWE)	9.45	5	9.455
6	Johan Pettersson (FIN)	9.375	6	9.375
7	Edward Roberts (USA)	9.36		
8	Elmer Niklander (FIN)	8.865		
9	Ville Pörhölä (FIN)	8.85		
10	James McEachern (USA)	8.84		
11	Nils Linde (SWE)	8.635		
12	Robert Olsson (SWE)	8.555		
