= Robert Lindsay-Watson =

Scottish sportsman (1886–1956)

Personal information
- Nationality: British (Scottish)
- Born: 4 October 1886 Hawick, Scotland
- Died: 26 January 1956 (aged 69) Hawick, Scotland

Sport
- Sport: Athletics
- Event: Hammer throw
- Club: University of Cambridge AC; Achilles Club

Rugby union career
- Position: Wing
Amateur team(s)
Years	Team	Apps	(Points)
- Hawick
Provincial / State sides
Years	Team	Apps	(Points)
1911	South of Scotland District		
International career
Years	Team	Apps	(Points)
1909	Scotland	1	(3)

Robert Lindsay-Watson (4 October 1886 – 26 January 1956) was a Scotland international rugby union player and an Olympic athlete.

== Athletics career ==
He was schooled at Glenalmond College Perth, Trinity College, Cambridge and St. Mary's School, Melrose. The Southern Reporter of 23 July 1908 said of Lindsay-Watson: "Robert Lindsay Watson might said to be St. Mary's representative in the Olympic Games in London, as he is one of the team of Scottish Athletes."

Lindsay-Watson represented Great Britain at the 1908 Summer Olympics in London, where he competed in the men's hammer throw event. Prior to the Games he finished third behind Simon Gillis in the hammer throw event at the 1908 AAA Championships.

== Rugby Union career ==
He played for South of Scotland District in their match against North of Scotland District on 9 December 1911.

He was capped by Scotland once, in 1909.

He became President of the Hawick club when his playing days ended.

== Military career ==
He joined the 10th Gordon Highlanders and fought in the First World War. The Edinburgh Evening News reported a number of Borders Rugby players either killed or injured on 30 September 1915:

LIEUT. R. H. LINDSAY WATSON.
Lieut. Robert H. Lindsay Watson, of the 10th Gordon Highlanders, son of T. Lindsay Watson, tweed manufacturer, Hawick, has been wounded action in Flanders. He is the well known Rugby footballer.
