= 2023 European Athletics U23 Championships – Men's hammer throw =

Men's hammer throw at the 2023 European Athletics U23 Championships
- Venue: Leppävaara Stadium
- Location: Espoo, Finland
- Dates: 13 July (qualification); 15 July (final)
- Competitors: 21 from 15 nations
- Winning distance: 77.21 m

Medalists
gold medal	Mykhaylo Kokhan	Ukraine
silver medal	Merlin Hummel	Germany
bronze medal	Sören Klose	Germany

The men's hammer throw event at the 2023 European Athletics U23 Championships was held in Espoo, Finland, at Leppävaara Stadium on 13 and 15 July.

== Records ==
Prior to the competition, the records were as follows:

European U23 record	Olli-Pekka Karjalainen (FIN)	81.70 m	Lahti, Finland	16 June 2002
Championship U23 record	Nicolas Figère (FRA)	80.88 m	Amsterdam, Netherlands	15 July 2001

== Results ==
=== Qualification ===
Qualification rules: All athletes over 71.00 m (Q) or at least 12 best (q) will advance to the final.

Rank	Group	Name	Nationality	#1	#2	#3	Mark	Notes
1	B	Mykhaylo Kokhan	Ukraine	72.25			72.25	Q
2	B	Dawid Piłat	Poland	72.24			72.24	Q
3	A	Halil Yılmazer	Turkey	67.97	68.76	71.33	71.33	Q
4	B	Orestis Ntousakis	Greece	70.08	x	68.72	70.08	q
5	A	Sören Klose	Germany	x	69.85	68.21	69.85	q
6	B	Jean-Baptiste Bruxelle	France	69.40	69.53	69.33	69.53	q
7	A	Jan Doležálek	Czech Republic	66.63	63.60	69.30	69.30	q
8	A	Tomasz Ratajczyk	Poland	68.74	67.31	x	68.74	q
9	B	Merlin Hummel	Germany	68.66	x	66.60	68.66	q
10	A	Nikolaos Polychroniou	Greece	68.36	68.35	x	68.36	q
11	B	Valentin Andreev	Bulgaria	67.64	67.07	x	67.64	q
12	B	Benedek Doma	Hungary	64.51	67.22	x	67.22	q
13	A	Davide Costa	Italy	65.14	66.43	x	66.43	
14	A	Ioannis Korakidis	Greece	64.04	x	66.09	66.09	
15	A	Oskari Lahtinen	Finland	62.32	65.92	x	65.92	PB
16	A	Kenneth Ikeji	Great Britain	x	65.78	x	65.78	
17	B	Jan Emberšič	Slovenia	63.40	64.09	65.30	65.30	
18	A	Dragos Ionut Nicorici	Romania	x	x	64.10	64.10	
19	B	Lars Wolfisberg	Switzerland	x	63.42	x	63.42	
20	A	Lukas Baroke	Switzerland	x	61.79	63.07	63.07	
	B	Adam Ziółkowski	Poland	x	x	x	NM	

=== Final ===
Rank	Name	Nationality	#1	#2	#3	#4	#5	#6	Result	Notes
1st place, gold medalist(s)	Mykhaylo Kokhan	Ukraine	73.68	76.16	76.08	75.35	70.73	77.21	77.21	SB
2nd place, silver medalist(s)	Merlin Hummel	Germany	62.60	x	73.39	x	x	75.71	75.71	
3rd place, bronze medalist(s)	Sören Klose	Germany	71.31	72.42	73.70	x	72.51	71.42	73.70	
4	Dawid Piłat	Poland	x	69.36	71.09	68.01	72.44	x	72.44	
5	Nikolaos Polychroniou	Greece	70.68	71.50	71.09	70.12	69.19	x	71.50	
6	Jan Doležálek	Czech Republic	70.86	70.46	x	70.70	x	x	70.86	
7	Halil Yilmazer	Turkey	69.77	70.67	x	x	67.23	68.79	70.67	
8	Valentin Andreev	Bulgaria	68.74	69.46	70.36	68.68	70.58	69.04	70.58	
9	Tomasz Ratajczyk	Poland	70.14	x	x				70.14	
10	Jean-Baptiste Bruxelle	France	67.26	x	68.56				68.56	
11	Benedek Doma	Hungary	x	67.05	68.40				68.40	
12	Orestis Dusakis	Greece	68.09	68.38	x				68.38	
