= Basil Bennett =

American hammer thrower

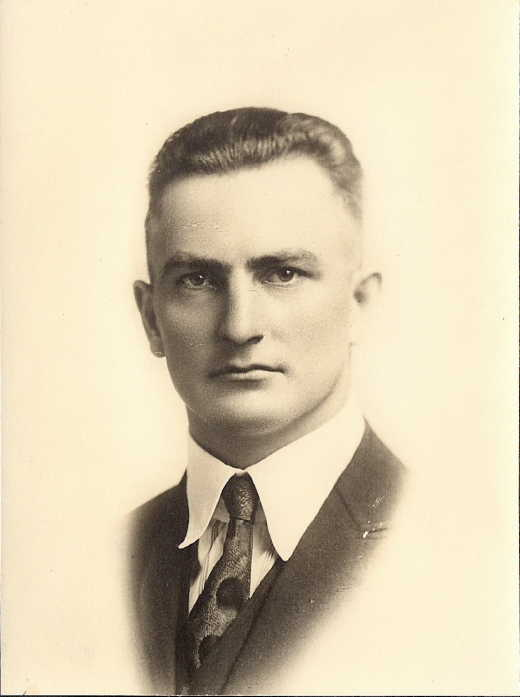
- Born: November 30, 1894; Dudley, Illinois, United States
- Died: August 19, 1938 (aged 43); Maywood, Illinois, Illinois, United States
- Education: University of Illinois, Illinois
- Occupations: Athlete, High School Teacher, Agricultural Agent, Soldier
- Known for: Olympic athlete
- Spouse: Ella G. Dystrup (married 1921)
- Children: 4

Olympic medal record

Men's athletics

Representing the United States
Bronze medal – third place	1920 Antwerp	Hammer throw

Basil B. Bennett (November 30, 1894 – August 19, 1938) was an American athlete who competed mainly in the hammer throw. He competed for the United States in the 1920 Summer Olympics held in Antwerp, Belgium in the hammer throw, where he won the Bronze medal.

He was born in Dudley, Illinois. He attended the University of Illinois, and after he graduated, he became a high school teacher in Illinois and then a county agricultural agent in North Dakota. During World War I, he served as a sergeant in the 309th Infantry Regiment of the 78th Infantry Division. After World War I, he returned to Illinois, where he served in multiple roles, including president of the DuPage County Farmers Institute, member of the executive committee of the DuPage County Farm Bureau, and director of a local school district. He died in Maywood, Illinois of a severe adrenal disorder and leukemia.
