= John Cameron (athlete) =

Canadian hammer thrower

Medal record

Men's Athletics

British Empire Games
Bronze medal – third place	1930 Hamilton	Hammer throw

John A. Cameron (March 28, 1886 – November 17, 1953) was a Canadian athlete who competed in the 1920 Summer Olympics. He was born in Scotland. In 1920, he participated in the Olympic hammer throw event but was unable to set a mark. At the 1930 Empire Games, he won the bronze medal in the hammer throw competition. He also competed in the shot put competition.
