= James McEachern =

American hammer thrower

James Marshall McEachern (June 2, 1881 – April 26, 1969) was an American track and field athlete who competed in the 1920 Summer Olympics and in the 1924 Summer Olympics. He was born in Georgetown, Prince Edward Island, Canada and died in San Francisco, California.

In 1920, he finished eighth in the hammer throw competition and tenth in the 56 pound weight throw event. Four years later, he finished sixth in the hammer throw competition.
