= Ernest May (athlete) =

British athlete (1878–1952)

Personal information
- Born: 14 September 1878 Bartlow, Cambridgeshire, England
- Died: 5 January 1952 (aged 73) Chathill, England

Sport
- Sport: Athletics
- Event: Discus/Hammer throw
- Club: London Athletic Club; University of Oxford AC; Achilles Club

Ernest Edmund Bedford May (14 September 1878 Bartlow, Cambridgeshire – 5 January 1952) was a British track and field athlete who competed in the 1908 Summer Olympics.

== Biography ==
May, born in Cambridgeshire, attended Haileybury School and Oriel College, Oxford.

He finished runner-up behind Tom Kiely at the 1901 AAA Championships and repeated the success twice more, starting the following year at the 1902 AAA Championships (behind Kiely again) and the 1903 AAA Championships (behind Tom Nicolson).

May represented Great Britain at the 1908 Summer Olympics in London, where he participated in the discus throw competition, in the Greek discus throw event, in the freestyle javelin throw competition, in the javelin throw event, and in the hammer throw competition but in all these competitions his final ranking is unknown.

He was an Anglican clergyman, Chaplain of Christ Church, Oxford and a Minor Canon of Durham Cathedral and died in Chathill, Ellingham.
