= Gunnar Johnson =

Swedish hammer thrower

Gunnar Johnson (July 3, 1889 – June 19, 1926) was a Swedish track and field athlete who competed in the 1912 Summer Olympics. In 1912, he finished eleventh in the hammer throw competition.
