= Edward Roberts (athlete) =

American weight thrower

Edward Reese Roberts (October 4, 1892 – August 14, 1956) was an American track and field athlete who competed in the 1920 Summer Olympics. He was born in Avon, Illinois and died in Opa-locka, Florida. In 1920, he finished seventh in the 56 pound weight throw competition.

He graduated from Harvard University and Harvard Law School.
