= Ludwig Uettwiller =

German track and field athlete

Octav Lucian ("Ludwig") Uettwiller (November 28, 1886 – June 25, 1949) was a German track and field athlete who competed in the 1908 Summer Olympics.

In 1908, he finished 17th in the standing high jump competition. He also participated in the long jump event, in the freestyle javelin throw competition, in the discus throw event, and in the hammer throw event but in all four competitions his final ranking is unknown.
