= Malcolm Svensson =

Swedish hammer thrower

Per Malcolm Svensson (25 October 1885 – 19 March 1961) was a Swedish track and field athlete who competed in the 1920 Summer Olympics. In 1920 he finished fourth in the hammer throw competition and fifth in the 56 pound weight throw event.
