= 1903 AAA Championships =

Outdoor track and field competition

- Dates: 4 July 1903
- Host city: Northampton, England
- Venue: County Cricket Ground, Northampton
- Level: Senior
- Type: Outdoor
- Events: 16

The 1903 AAA Championships was the 1903 edition of the annual outdoor track and field competition organised by the Amateur Athletic Association (AAA). It was held on Saturday 4 July 1903 at the County Cricket Ground, Northampton in Northampton, England, in front of 7,000 spectators.

== Summary ==
- The Championships consisted of 16 events.
- Arthur Duffey won a fourth consecutive 100 yards title.

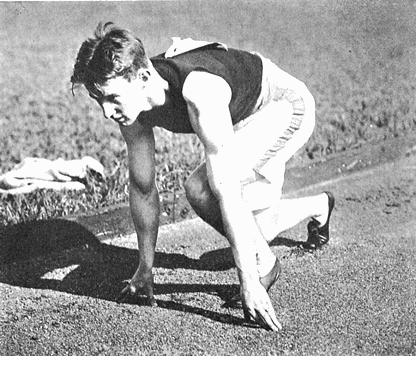
Duffey successfully defended his 100 yards title again

== Results ==
Event	Gold		Silver		Bronze	
100 yards	(United States) Arthur Duffey	10.0	F. Rivers	2 yd	Jimmy Tremeer	½ yd
220 yards	George Brewill	23.0	Jimmy Tremeer	1 yd	C. W. Fox	½ yd
440 yards	Charles McLachlan	52.2	George White	3 yd	Edwin Montague	2 yd
880 yards	(Scotland) Bernard Blunden	1:58.8	Albert Barker	2-5 yd	W. Baker	20 yd
1 mile	Alfred Shrubb	4:24.0	Joseph Binks	4:27.0	Edmund Gay-Roberts	4:42.0
4 miles	Alfred Shrubb	20:06.0	Thomas Edwards	21:11.0	only 2 competitors	
10 miles	Alfred Shrubb	51:55.8	Frank James	56:57.2	E. H. R. Redfearn	57:17.6
steeplechase	Sidney Robinson	10:58.0	Arthur Russell	8-10 yd	Arthur Nicholls	40-50 yd
120yd hurdles	George Garnier	15.8	Alfred Trafford	3 yd	(Wales) Wyatt Gould	1-2 yd
2 miles walk	Edward Negus	14:44.4	G. A. Bush	14:51.0	Thomas O'Gorman	15:04.0
7 miles walk	Jack Butler	56:17.2	W. H. Martindale	58:17.4	W. Endean	58:36.8
high jump	(Leinster) Peter O'Connor	1.727	not awarded		only 1 competitor	
pole jump	(Germany) S. Morriss	2.59	not awarded		only 1 competitor	
long jump	(Leinster) Peter O'Connor	6.95	(Leinster) Patrick Harding	6.31	only 2 competitors	
shot put	(Scotland) Tom Nicolson	12.38	Henry Alan Leeke	11.36	George Clark	11.27
hammer throw	(Scotland) Tom Nicolson	43.46	Ernest May	35.98	P. G. Masters	32.61
