= Con Walsh =

Canadian hammer thrower

Medal record

Men's athletics

Representing Canada

Olympic Games
Bronze medal – third place	1908 London	Hammer throw

Cornelius Edward "Con" Walsh (24 April 1885 – 7 December 1961) was an Irish Canadian athlete who represented Canada at the 1908 Summer Olympics. He was born in Carriganimma. He won a bronze medal in the hammer throw, finishing third behind fellow Irishmen John Flanagan and Matt McGrath, both of whom represented the United States. Another Irishman, Robert Kerr also represented Canada at the same games. Walsh had earlier played Gaelic football and represented Cork.

Walsh also competed for both the Irish American Athletic Club and the New York Athletic Club. He was part of a group of Irish weight throwers that were collectively known as the "Irish Whales."

In 1910 Walsh set the record for throwing the 56-pound (25.4-kg) weight for height, breaking Pat McDonald's record by throwing the weight 16 feet 7/8 inches high (5.07 metres) at the second annual athletic meet of the New York Press Club Athletic Association.
