= Johan Pettersson (athlete) =

Finnish hammer thrower

Johan Petter Pettersson (29 July 1884 in Jeppo – 26 September 1952) was a Finnish track and field athlete who competed in the 1920 Summer Olympics. He was born in Jeppo. In 1920, he finished sixth in the 56 pound weight throw competition and eleventh in the hammer throw event.
