= Athletics at the 1920 Summer Olympics – Men's hammer throw =

Men's hammer throw at the Games of the VII Olympiad
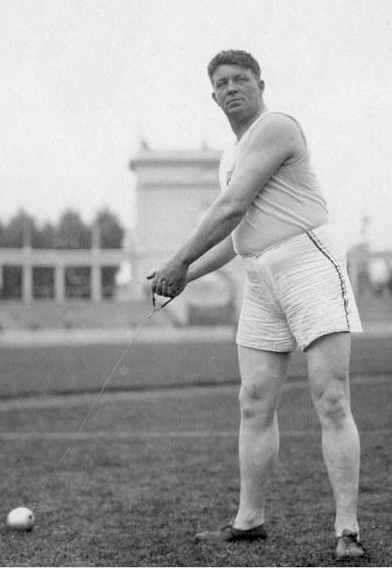
- Patrick Ryan
- Venue: Olympisch Stadion
- Date: August 18, 1920
- Competitors: 12 from 5 nations
- Winning distance: 52.875

Medalists
1st place, gold medalist(s)		Patrick Ryan; United States
2nd place, silver medalist(s)		Carl Johan Lind; Sweden
3rd place, bronze medalist(s)		Basil Bennett; United States

The men's hammer throw event was part of the track and field athletics programme at the 1920 Summer Olympics. The competition was held on Wednesday, August 18, 1920. 12 throwers from 5 nations competed; four from Sweden, four from the United States, two from Canada, one from Great Britain, and one from Finland. No nation had more than 4 athletes, suggesting the limit had been reduced from the 12 maximum in force in 1908 and 1912. The event was won by Patrick Ryan of the United States, the nation's fifth consecutive victory in the event. Carl Johan Lind took silver, earning Sweden's first medal in the hammer throw. Another American, Basil Bennett, earned bronze.

== Background ==
This was the fifth appearance of the event, which has been held at every Summer Olympics except 1896. Four of the 14 competitors from the pre-war 1912 Games returned: gold medalist Matt McGrath of the United States and three Swedes: fourth-place finisher Robert Olsson, fifth-place finisher Carl Johan Lind, and seventh-place finisher Nils Linde. McGrath, who would earn seven AAU championships from 1908 to 1926, and fellow American and world-record holder Patrick Ryan, who would win eight AAU championships in that time, were expected to dominate the event. McGrath, however, suffered an injury and could not challenge for the medals.

Finland made its debut in the event. The United States appeared for the fifth time, the only nation to have competed at each appearance of the event to that point.

== Competition format ==
The competition continued to use the divided-final format used since 1908, with results carrying over between "rounds". The number of finalists expanded from three in previous Games to six in 1920. Each athlete received three throws in the qualifying round. The top six men advanced to the final, where they received an additional three throws. The best result, qualifying or final, counted.

== Records ==
These were the standing world and Olympic records (in metres) prior to the 1920 Summer Olympics.

World record	Patrick Ryan (USA)	57.77	New York City, United States	17 August 1913
Olympic record	Matt McGrath (USA)	54.74	Stockholm, Sweden	14 July 1912

No new world or Olympic records were set during the competition.

== Schedule ==
Date	Time	Round
Wednesday, 18 August 1920	10:45; 15:30	Qualifying; Final

== Results ==
The best six hammer throwers qualified for the final. McGrath injured his knee during the second throw in qualifying and withdrew, though still had thrown far enough to take fifth place.

Rank	Athlete	Nation	Qualifying	Final	Distance
1st place, gold medalist(s)	Patrick Ryan	United States	52.830	52.875	52.875
2nd place, silver medalist(s)	Carl Johan Lind	Sweden	48.000	48.430	48.430
3rd place, bronze medalist(s)	Basil Bennett	United States	48.250	48.250	48.250
4	Malcolm Svensson	Sweden	47.290	Unknown	47.290
5	Matt McGrath	United States	46.670	—	46.670
6	Tom Nicolson	Great Britain	—	45.700	45.700
7	Nils Linde	Sweden	44.885	Unknown	44.885
8	James McEachern	United States	44.700	Did not advance	44.700
9	Archie McDiarmid	Canada	44.560	Did not advance	44.660
10	Robert Olsson	Sweden	44.190	Did not advance	44.190
11	Johan Pettersson	Finland	41.760	Did not advance	41.760
—	John Cameron	Canada	NM	Did not advance	NM

== Sources ==
- Belgium Olympic Committee (1957). Olympic Games Antwerp 1920: Official Report (in French).
- Wudarski, Pawel (1999). "Wyniki Igrzysk Olimpijskich" (in Polish).
