= Ronald Mencía =

Cuban hammer thrower (born 2002)

Personal information
- Full name: Ronald Anthony Mencía Zayas
- Born: 26 August 2002 (age 23)
- Height: 1.91 m (6 ft 3 in)
- Weight: 102 kg (225 lb)

Sport
- Sport: Athletics
- Event: Hammer throw

Ronald Anthony Mencía Zayas (born 26 August 2002) is a Cuban athlete specialising in the hammer throw. He represented his country at the 2023 World Championships without advancing to the final.

His personal best in the event is 76.66 metres set in Havana in 2023.

== International competitions ==
Year	Competition	Venue	Position	Event	Notes
Representing Cuba
2019	Pan American U20 Championships	San José, Costa Rica	2nd	Hammer throw (6 kg)	71.34 m
2021	World U20 Championships	Nairobi, Kenya	7th	Hammer throw (6 kg)	71.60 m
2021	Junior Pan American Games (U23)	Cali, Colombia	2nd	Hammer throw	67.23 m
2023	Central American and Caribbean Games	San Salvador, El Salvador	4th	Hammer throw	71.32 m
2023	World Championships	Budapest, Hungary	26th (q)	Hammer throw	71.72 m
2023	Pan American Games	Santiago, Chile	8th	Hammer throw	71.52 m
2024	Ibero-American Championships	Cuiabá, Brazil	3rd	Hammer throw	73.20 m
2025	NACAC Championships	Freeport, Bahamas	4th	Hammer throw	71.79 m
2025	World Championships	Tokyo, Japan	19th (q)	Hammer throw	74.14 m
2026	Pan American Championships	Medellín, Colombia	5th	Hammer throw	74.18 m
2026	Central American and Caribbean Games	Santo Domingo, Dominican Republic	1st	Hammer throw	74.55 m
