= 2021 World Athletics U20 Championships – Men's hammer throw =

Men's hammer throw at the 2021 World Athletics U20 Championships
- Venue: Kasarani Stadium
- Dates: 18 August (qualification); 20 August (final)
- Competitors: 24 from 20 nations
- Winning distance: 77.83 m

Medalists
gold medal	Jan Doležálek	Czech Republic
silver medal	Orestis Ntousakis	Greece
bronze medal	Jean-Baptiste Bruxelle	France

The men's hammer throw at the 2021 World Athletics U20 Championships was held at the Kasarani Stadium on 18 and 20 August.

== Records ==
Standing records prior to the 2021 World Athletics U20 Championships
World U20 Record	Ashraf Amgad El-Seify (QAT)	85.57	Barcelona, Spain	14 July 2012
Championship Record	Ashraf Amgad El-Seify (QAT)	85.57	Barcelona, Spain	14 July 2012
World U20 Leading	Merlin Hummel (GER)	81.21	Bamberg, Germany	26 June 2021

== Results ==
=== Qualification ===
The qualification took place on 18 August, in two groups, with Group A starting at 09:08 and Group B starting at 10:36. Athletes attaining a mark of at least 74.00 metres ( Q ) or at least the 12 best performers ( q ) qualified for the final.

Rank	Group	Name	Nationality	Round			Mark	Notes
Rank	Group	Name	Nationality	1	2	3	Mark	Notes
1	B	Jan Doležálek	Czech Republic	77.58			77.58	Q, NU20R
2	A	Orestis Ntousakis	Greece	76.25			76.25	Q
3	B	Ronald Mencía	Cuba	73.59	74.98		74.98	Q
4	A	Ethan Katzberg	Canada	74.39			74.39	Q
5	A	Jean-Baptiste Bruxelle	France	x	74.06		74.06	Q
6	B	Dawid Piłat	Poland	72.44	x	72.85	72.85	q
7	B	Theodoros Ziogas	Greece	x	72.61	x	72.61	q
8	A	Juan Jiménez	Spain	71.05	69.44	68.23	71.05	q
9	B	Arttu Härkönen	Finland	70.63	x	69.74	70.63	q, PB
10	B	Valentin Andreev	Bulgaria	x	x	70.54	70.54	q
11	B	Davide Costa	Italy	65.50	70.31	67.31	70.31	q
12	A	Oleg Yakushkin	Authorised Neutral Athletes	70.29	x	x	70.29	q
13	A	Tomasz Ratajczyk	Poland	x	69.43	x	69.43	
14	A	Jan Emberšič	Slovenia	x	67.78	x	67.78	
15	A	Emirhan Şipşak	Turkey	x	64.35	67.11	67.11	
16	A	Sebastian Tommasi	Argentina	x	65.73	63.53	65.73	
17	B	Aldo Zavala	Mexico	x	x	65.65	65.65	
18	A	Cristian Meheș	Romania	x	x	65.08	65.08	
19	B	Balázs Katavics	Hungary	x	64.06	x	64.06	
20	B	Vipin Kumar	India	x	62.24	63.17	63.17	
21	A	Makars Korotkovs	Latvia	62.36	x	62.47	62.47	
	B	Dragoș Nicorici	Romania	x	x	x	NM	
	A	Gregorio Giorgis	Italy	x	x	x	NM	
	B	Pieter-Juan Vorstman	South Africa	x	x	x	NM	

=== Final ===
The final was held on 20 August at 16:17.

Rank	Name	Nationality	Round						Mark	Notes
Rank	Name	Nationality	1	2	3	4	5	6	Mark	Notes
1st place, gold medalist(s)	Jan Doležálek	Czech Republic	x	77.35	x	73.87	77.83	x	77.83	NU20R
2nd place, silver medalist(s)	Orestis Ntousakis	Greece	x	75.69	77.78	x	x	73.54	77.78	
3rd place, bronze medalist(s)	Jean-Baptiste Bruxelle	France	75.86	77.70	x	x	73.88	74.07	77.70	
4	Dawid Piłat	Poland	72.14	75.95	x	72.14	77.09	72.00	77.09	
5	Oleg Yakushkin	Authorised Neutral Athletes	68.84	x	71.41	73.20	x	73.31	73.31	
6	Theodoros Ziogas	Greece	69.02	70.44	71.39	x	70.91	72.24	72.24	
7	Ronald Mencía	Cuba	x	x	69.84	68.83	71.60	x	71.60	
8	Davide Costa	Italy	67.56	68.67	70.62	x	x	–	70.62	
9	Valentin Andreev	Bulgaria	68.89	69.42	67.29				69.42	
10	Juan Jiménez	Spain	x	67.90	68.63				68.63	
11	Arttu Härkönen	Finland	x	67.23	68.34				68.34	
	Ethan Katzberg	Canada	x	x	x				NM	
