= Carriganimmy =

Village in County Cork, Ireland

Carriganima Carraig an Ime
- Village
- Location in Ireland
- Coordinates: 51°58′N 9°02′W
- Country: Ireland
- Province: Munster
- County: County Cork
- Time zone: UTC+0 (WET)
  - Summer (DST): UTC-1 (IST (WEST))

Carriganima or Carriganimmy (Irish: Carraig an Ime) is a village in the Barony of Muskerry, County Cork, Ireland, situated approximately 11 km northwest of Macroom and 10 km south of Millstreet. The village lies in a valley between the Boggeragh and Derrynasaggart mountain ranges.

Local townlands include Carriganima (Carraig an Ime), Knockraheen (Cnoc Raithín), Cusloura (Cois Labhra), Glendav (Gleann Daimh), Glantane East & West (Gleanntán) and Moanflugh (An Muine Fliuch). The townlands of Glendav (Gleann Daimh), Lisscarrigane (Lios Carragáin), and Labbadermody (Leaba Dhiarmada) are included in the Muskerry Gaeltacht (Gaeltacht Mhúscraí). Carriganimmy is within the Cork North-West Dáil constituency.

== Notable people ==
Carriganima is the homeplace of the famous Irish language writer and Catholic priest, an t-Athair Peadar Ua Laoghaire, who was born in the townland of Liscarrigane (Lios Carragáin) and attended Carriganima National School.

Art O'Leary met his poetic martyrdom in Carriganima on the 4th of May, 1773. He was waked in the flax mill in the village, where his wife, Eibhlín Dubh Ní Chonaill began composing Caoineadh Airt Uí Laoghaire. This lament is considered to be the most impressive piece of poetry to be ever written in any language.

Cornelius E. "Con" Walsh - bronze medal winner in the hammer throw while representing Canada at the 1908 Summer Olympics.

== See also ==
- List of towns and villages in Ireland
