= Archie McDiarmid =

Canadian hammer thrower

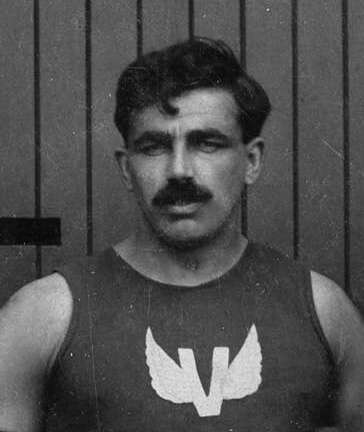

Personal information
- National team: Canadian
- Born: December 8, 1881 Balvicar, Scotland
- Died: August 11, 1957 (aged 75)

Sport
- Country: Canada
- Sport: Track and field
- Event: Hammer throw

Archibald McDiarmid (December 8, 1881 – August 11, 1957) was a Canadian track and field athlete born in Balvicar, Scotland who competed in the 1920 Summer Olympics.

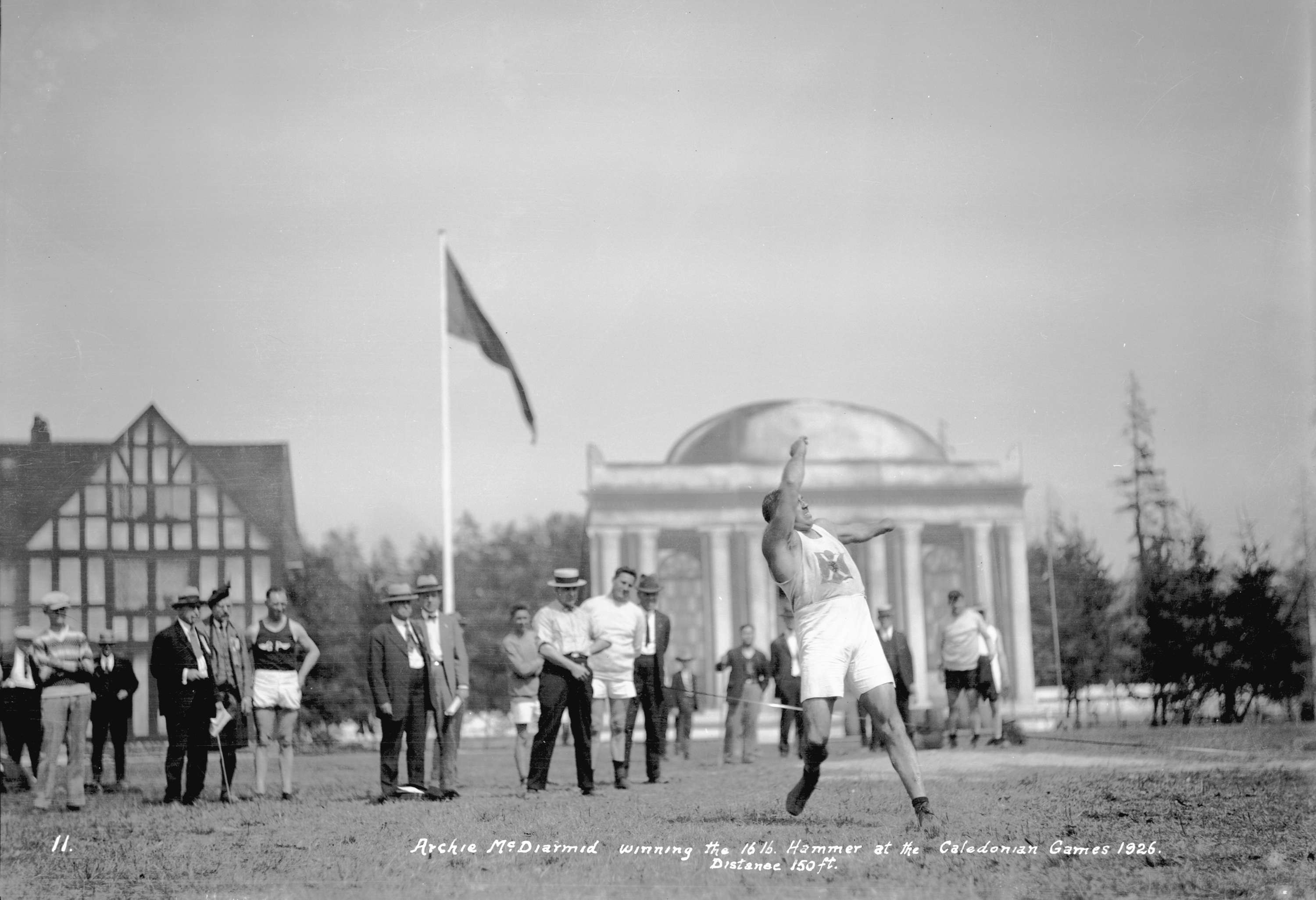
Archie McDiarmid winning the 16 lb. hammer at the Caledonian Games, distance 150 feet

In 1920, he finished fourth in the 56 pound weight throw competition and ninth in the hammer throw event. McDiarmid was the flag-bearer for Canada at the 1920 Olympics. He finished sixth in the 1930 British Empire Games hammer throw.
