= Jan Doležálek =

Czech hammer thrower (born 2002)

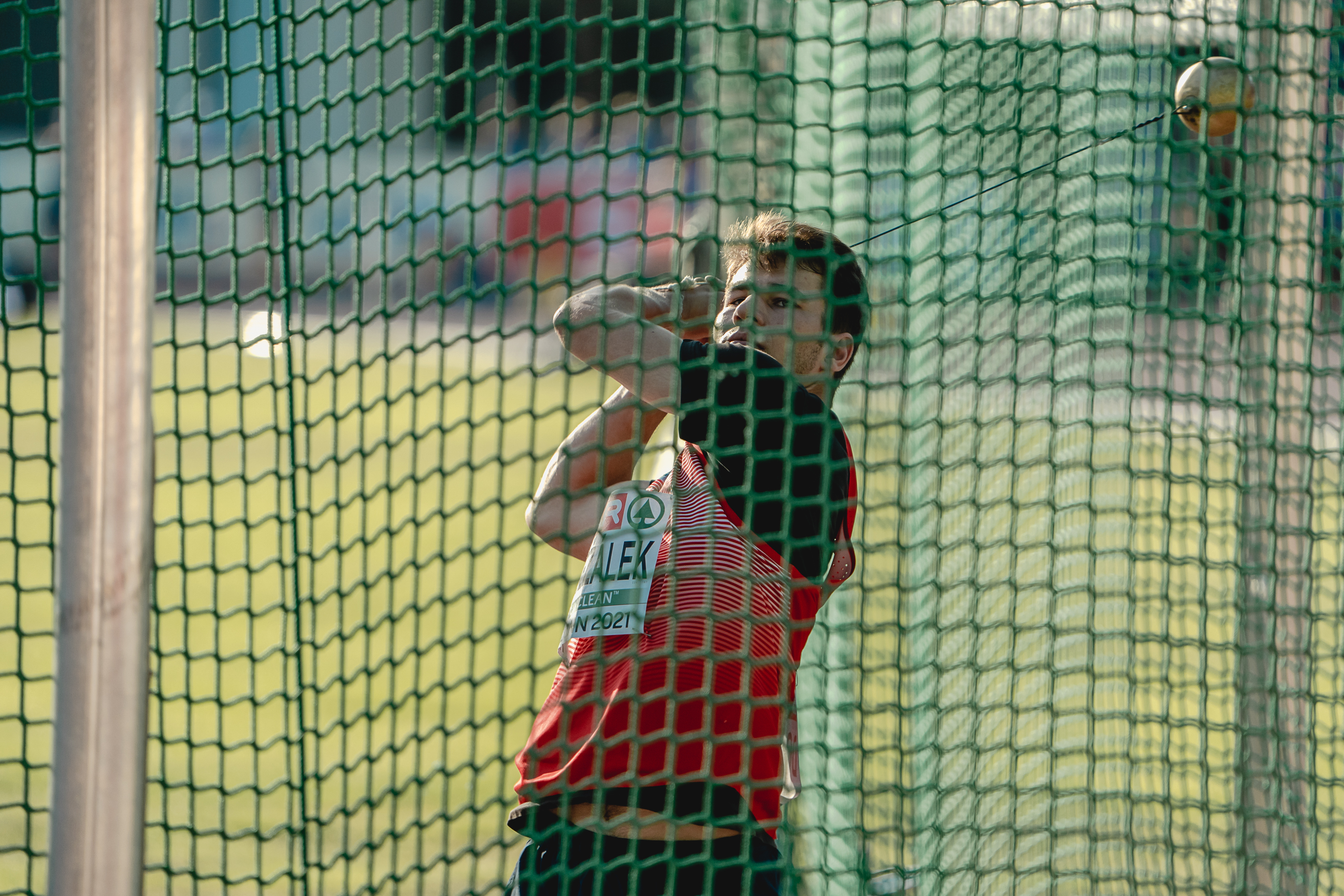

Personal information
- National team: Czech Republic
- Born: 23 May 2002 (age 24) Pardubice
- Height: 186
- Weight: 89

Sport
- Country: Czech Republic
- Sport: Athletics
- Event(s): Shot put, Hammer throw, Discus throw
- Club: Hvězda Pardubice

Achievements and titles
- Personal best: Hammer throw Outdoor 6kg: 77.83 m (2020) NU20R
Medal record
World U20 Championships
Gold medal – first place	2021 Nairobi	Hammer throw

Jan Doležálek (born 23 May 2002) is a Czech athlete who specializes in the hammer throw. He was the gold medallist at the World Athletics U20 Championships in 2021.
