= Benjamin Sherman (Michigan politician) =

American politician

Member of the Michigan House of Representatives from the St. Joseph County district
- In office November 2, 1835 – January 1, 1837

Personal details
- Born: 1792 Connecticut
- Died: 1872 (aged 79–80)
- Party: Democratic

Benjamin Sherman (1792 – 1872) was an American politician who served one term in the Michigan House of Representatives in its first session after adoption of the state constitution.

== Biography ==
Benjamin Sherman was born in Connecticut in 1792. He settled in Genesee County, New York, and was a contractor on the Erie Canal project. He moved to Nottawa, Michigan Territory in 1825.

He was elected as a Democrat to the Michigan House of Representatives in the first election under the state's constitution in 1835, and served through 1836. He was the St. Joseph County coroner from 1833 to 1837, a county supervisor in 1832, a justice of the peace from 1836 to 1846, and a lieutenant colonel in the state militia in 1835. He also served as the register of the United States land office at Ionia, Michigan, under Presidents Martin Van Buren and Franklin Pierce. Sherman Township was named after him in 1829, and he began running a tavern there in 1831.

Sherman died in 1872.
