= Simon Gillis =

American hammer and discus thrower

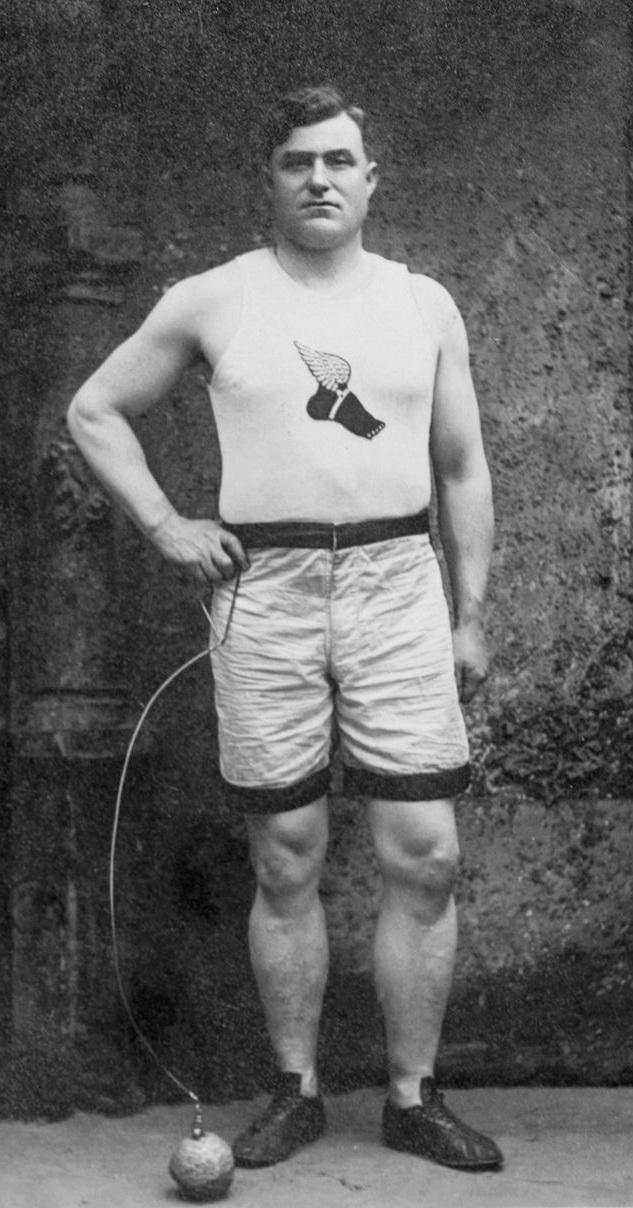
- Simon Gillis in 1912

Personal information
- Born: April 6, 1875 Cape Breton, Nova Scotia, Canada
- Died: January 14, 1964 (aged 88) Phoenix, Arizona, United States
- Height: 1.85 m (6 ft 1 in)
- Weight: 109 kg (240 lb)

Sport
- Sport: Athletics
- Event: Hammer throw
- Club: NYAC, New York

Achievements and titles
- Personal bests: 51.89 m (170'3", 1908)

Simon Peter Gillis (April 6, 1875 – January 14, 1964) was an American track and field athlete, a member of the New York Athletic Club, and the New York City Police Department. He was one of a group of athletes known as the Irish Whales and frequently kept company with members of the Irish American Athletic Club. He competed in weight throwing events in the 1904, 1908 and 1912 Summer Olympics.

== Biography ==
He was born on Cape Breton Island, Canada, but moved to New York as a teenager to join his brother.

In 1904, Gillis accidentally killed a boy when he was practicing his hammer throw in a vacant lot in Harlem. Gillis was practicing with a 16-pound (7 kg) hammer in a vacant lot on Park Avenue between 134th and 135th street on September 30, 1904, and "just as he had let the 16 pound hammer go for an extra long throw, Christian Koehler, a fourteen-year-old boy, climbed the fence in pursuit of a baseball. Gillis and several boys shouted a warning, but Koehler did not hear. The hammer struck him in the head, and he was instantly killed." Gillis, who was a big, good-natured fellow, was said to be "...heartbroken over the affair."

In 1906, Gillis was the National Amateur Athletic Union junior champion hammer thrower, with a throw of 161 feet and 8 inches (49.28 m). That same year, he won the Canadian championship as well.

In 1908, he finished seventh in the hammer throw event. He also participated in the discus throw event, but his result is unknown. Prior to the 1908 Summer Olympic Games, Gillis won the English amateur championship with the 16 lb. hammer with a throw of 164 feet 5 inches (50.11 m) at the 1908 AAA Championships.

Four years later, he competed in the 1912 Olympic hammer throw contest but was not able to set a mark. A carpenter by trade, after the 1908 Olympics, he joined the New York City police force. He later took a contracting job in Spain and spent a few years working in Europe. On his return to New York, he worked for Thomas Edison, creating screen titles for silent movies and even made a few film appearances. He then headed West, eventually settling in Phoenix, where he and his wife Bridget ran a rooming house during the Depression. Gillis ended his working life building smokestacks for smelting metal.
