= James Mitchel =

American athlete

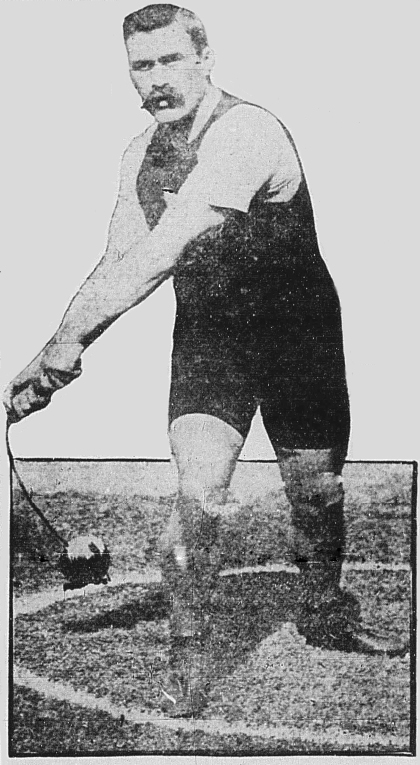
- Mitchel throwing 16 pound hammer, 1906

Medal record

Men's athletics

Representing the United States

Olympic Games
| Bronze medal – third place | 1904 St Louis | 56 pound weight throw |

James Sarsfield Mitchel (born Mitchell; January 30, 1864 – July 3, 1921) was an Irish-born American field athlete who competed in the 1904 Olympics. He was one of a group of Irish-American athletes known as the "Irish Whales."

== Biography ==
Mitchell was born in Emly, County Tipperary, Ireland,

Mitchell won the shot put and hammer throw titles at the 1887 AAA Championships. The following year he successfully defended his hammer tile at the 1888 AAA Championships.

He competed in events organized by the Gaelic Athletic Association (GAA) and was in the GAA's 1888 American Invasion Tour, where he won a gold and two silver medals at the national championships of the National Association of Amateur Athletes of America. Like many of the GAA team, Mitchell remained in New York City rather than returning to Ireland at the end of the tour.

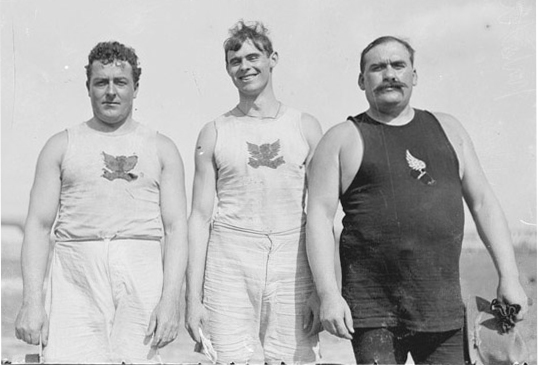
James Mitchel (on right) with other Irish Whales John Flanagan and Martin Sheridan at the 1904 Olympics

Mitchel represented New York Athletic Club at the 1904 Olympics in St Louis, Missouri. In the 56 lb weight throw he won the bronze medal. In the hammer throw competition he finished fifth and in the discus throw event he finished sixth.

Spalding Athletic Library issued several "how to" books, one being "How to become a weight thrower" by Olympian James Mitchel.
