= Benjamin Sherman (hammer thrower) =

American hammer thrower

Personal information
- Born: 5 April 1881 Ballston Spa, United States

Sport
- Sport: Athletics
- Event: Hammer throw

Benjamin Franklin Sherman (born April 5, 1881, date of death unknown) was an American hammer thrower. He competed in the men's hammer throw at the 1908 Summer Olympics and the 1912 Summer Olympics.

Sherman attended Harvard University where he competed as a weight thrower on the school's track and field team. He finished outside of the top 9 at the 1908 Olympic hammer throw. He was 5th at the 1910 USA Outdoor Track and Field Championships in the 56-lb weight throw for distance.

Later in his career, Sherman represented the Boston Athletic Association but was also known competing for the New York Athletic Club. He finished 12th in the 1912 Olympic hammer throw competition. He reached his first national podium at the 1917 USA Outdoor Track and Field Championships, finishing 3rd in the hammer throw.

After his athletics career, Sherman worked as a special agent with the United States Department of Labor in Washington, D.C. and then worked at the Harvard Club of New York City.
