= Duncan Gillis =

Canadian athlete (1883–1963)

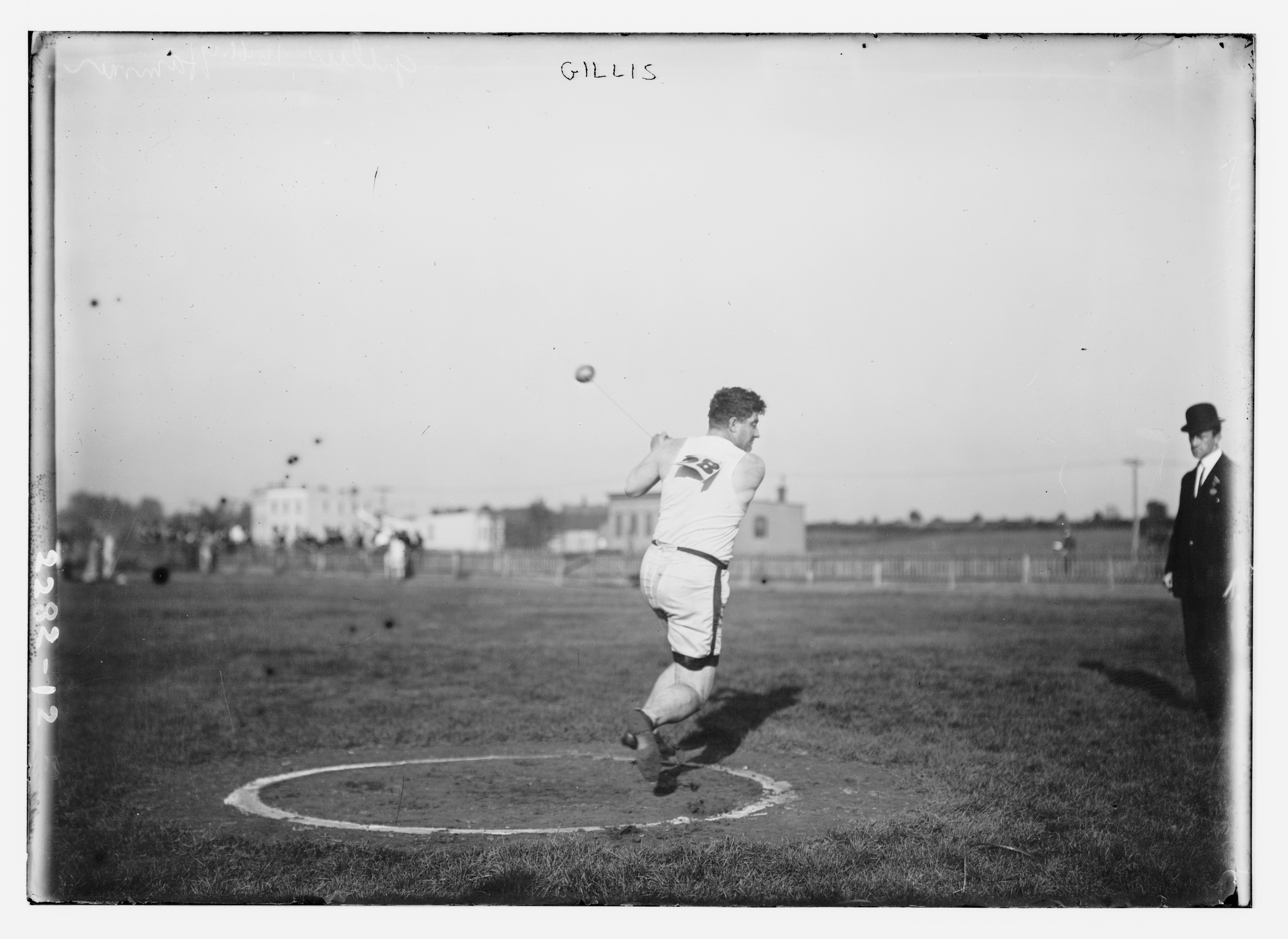

Medal record

Men's athletics
Silver medal – second place	1912 Stockholm	Hammer throw

Duncan Gillis (January 3, 1883 – May 2, 1963) was a Canadian athlete who competed in the 1912 Summer Olympics. Gillis was the first to serve as Canada's flag bearer during the Olympic opening ceremonies.

== Early life and career ==
Gillis was born in Cape Breton, Nova Scotia, and died in North Vancouver, British Columbia.

He competed for Canada in the 1912 Summer Olympics held in Stockholm, Sweden in the hammer throw where he won the silver medal with a best throw of 48.39 meters. He also participated in the discus throw event and finished 14th.
