= Athletics at the 1912 Summer Olympics – Men's hammer throw =

Men's hammer throw at the Games of the V Olympiad
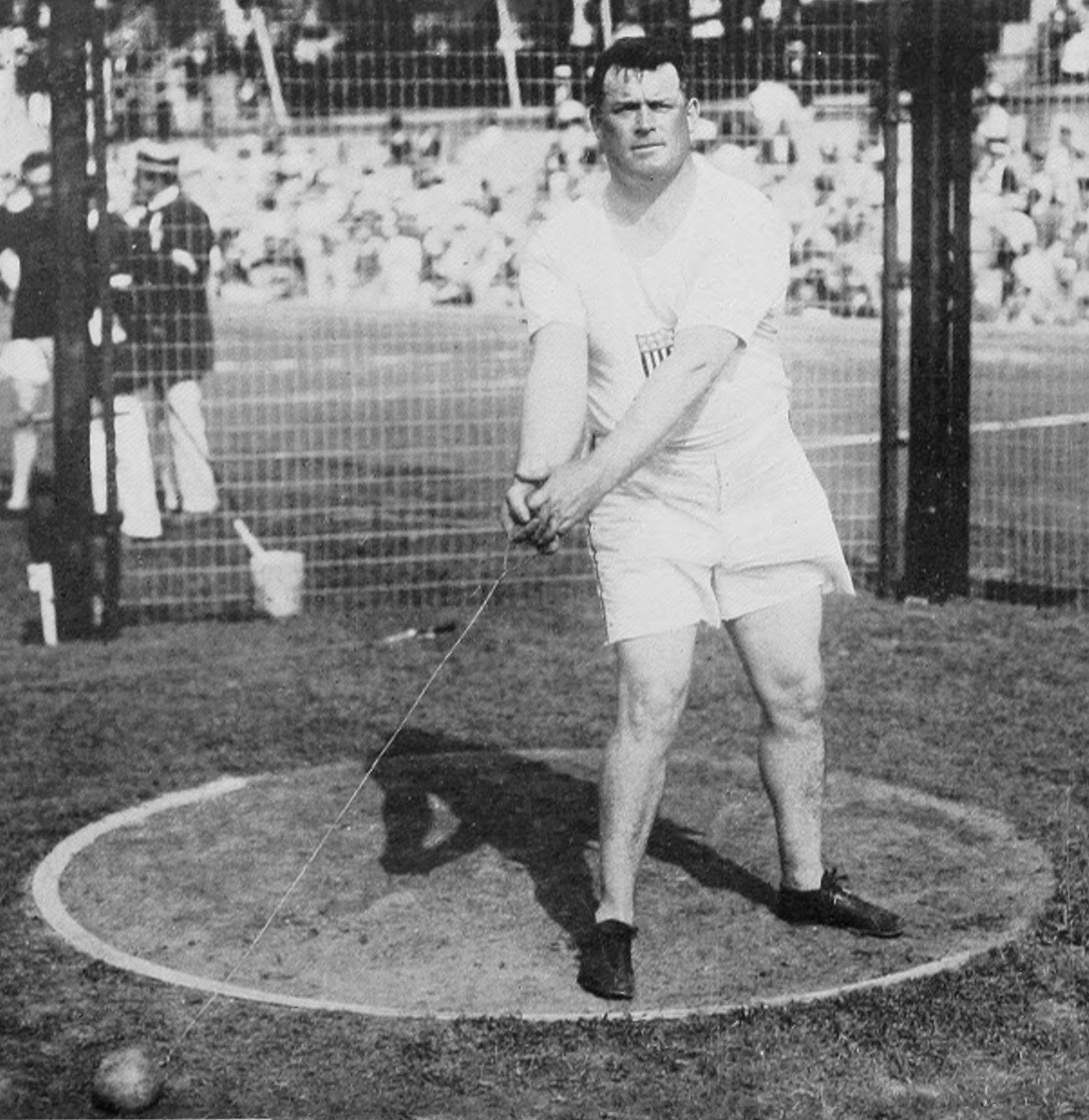
- McGrath on the way to win the gold medal.
- Venue: Stockholm Olympic Stadium
- Date: July 14, 1912
- Competitors: 14 from 4 nations
- Winning distance: 54.74 OR

Medalists
1st place, gold medalist(s)		Matt McGrath; United States
2nd place, silver medalist(s)		Duncan Gillis; Canada
3rd place, bronze medalist(s)		Clarence Childs; United States

The men's hammer throw was a track and field athletics event held as part of the athletics at the 1912 Summer Olympics programme. It was the fourth appearance of the event, which had been won all three previous times by John Flanagan. The competition was held on Sunday, July 14, 1912. Fourteen hammer throwers from four nations competed. NOCs could enter up to 12 athletes. The event was won by Matt McGrath of the United States, the nation's fourth consecutive victory in the event. McGrath was the second man (after Flanagan) to earn multiple medals in the hammer throw. Duncan Gillis of Canada took silver. Clarence Childs of the United States finished third for bronze.

The winning margin was an impressive 6.35 metres which as of 2023 remains the only time the men's hammer throw was won by more than five metres at the Olympics.

== Background ==
This was the fourth appearance of the event, which has been held at every Summer Olympics except 1896. In the absence of retired three-time champion American John Flanagan, the heavy favorite was another American: Matt McGrath, who had given Flanagan a strong challenge in 1908 and had replaced him as the top hammer thrower since the London Games.

Flanagan was the two-time defending Olympic champion, was a seven-time AAU champion, and had also won national titles in Great Britain and Ireland; he would have been the favorite, but he retired after the 1908 Games. Fellow American Matt McGrath was rising as a challenger, however, and had taken second place in the 1907 AAU championship. McGrath was struggling with a knee injury but still hoped to supplant the 40-year-old Flanagan as the premier hammer thrower of the day.

For the second time (after 1904), no nations made their debut in the event. The United States appeared for the fourth time, the only nation to have competed at each appearance of the event to that point.

== Competition format ==
The competition continued to use the divided-final format used in 1908, with results carrying over between the two "rounds". Each athlete received three throws in the qualifying round. The top three men advanced to the final, where they received an additional three throws. The best result, qualifying or final, counted.

== Records ==
These were the standing world and Olympic records (in metres) prior to the 1912 Summer Olympics.

World record	Matt McGrath (USA)	57.10^{*}	New York City, United States	29 October 1911
Olympic record	John Flanagan (USA)	51.92	London, United Kingdom of Great Britain and Ireland	14 July 1908

^{*} unofficial

Matt McGrath set a new Olympic record in the qualification with 54.13 metres and improved his record in the final with 54.74 metres.

== Schedule ==
Date	Time	Round
Sunday, 14 July 1912	13:30; 15:30	Qualifying; Final

== Results ==
Flanagan, who had won all three prior editions of the Olympic hammer throw and held the Olympic record of 51.92 metres, had retired since the 1908 Olympic Games. McGrath took the gold medal, besting Flanagan's Olympic record with all four of his legal marks. No other thrower beat Flanagan's Olympic mark. McGrath's worst legal throw was 4.44 metres longer than anyone else's best.

Rank	Athlete	Nation	1	2	3	4	5	6	Distance	Notes
1st place, gold medalist(s)	Matt McGrath	United States	54.13 OR	X	X	52.83	53.90	54.74 OR	54.74	OR
2nd place, silver medalist(s)	Duncan Gillis	Canada	46.17	X	48.39	X	47.24	X	48.39	
3rd place, bronze medalist(s)	Clarence Childs	United States	48.17	X	X	X	X	X	48.17	
4	Robert Olsson	Sweden	39.56	46.50	X	Did not advance			46.50	
5	Carl Johan Lind	Sweden	45.06	X	45.61	Did not advance			45.61	
6	Denis Carey	Great Britain	38.99	43.78	X	Did not advance			43.78	
7	Nils Linde	Sweden	43.32	X	X	Did not advance			43.32	
8	Carl Jahnzon	Sweden	39.18	42.58	X	Did not advance			42.58	
8	Ralph Rose	United States	X	40.80	42.58	Did not advance			42.58	
10	Arvid Åberg	Sweden	X	X	41.11	Did not advance			41.11	
11	Gunnar Johnson	Sweden	38.66	39.92	X	Did not advance			39.92	
12	Benjamin Sherman	United States	38.71	X	38.77	Did not advance			38.77	
13	Viktor Hackberg	Sweden	X	X	38.44	Did not advance			38.44	
—	Simon Gillis	United States	X	—	—	Did not advance			NM	

== Sources ==
- Bergvall, Erik, ed. (1913). The Official Report of the Olympic Games of Stockholm 1912. Translated by Adams-Ray, Edward. Stockholm: Wahlström & Widstrand.
- Wudarski, Pawel (1999). "Wyniki Igrzysk Olimpijskich" (in Polish).
