= Athletics at the 1904 Summer Olympics – Men's discus throw =

Men's discus throw at the Games of the III Olympiad
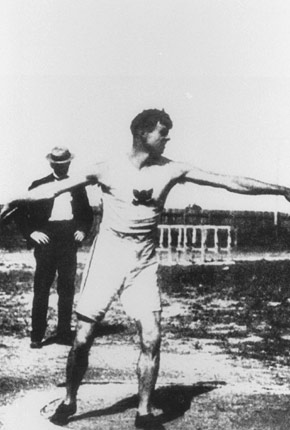
- Martin Sheridan throws the discus on the way to finishing with the gold
- Venue: Francis Field
- Date: September 3, 1904
- Competitors: 6 from 2 nations
- Winning distance: 39.28 OR

Medalists
1st place, gold medalist(s)		Martin Sheridan; United States
2nd place, silver medalist(s)		Ralph Rose; United States
3rd place, bronze medalist(s)		Nikolaos Georgantas; Greece

The men's discus throw was a track and field athletics event held as part of the Athletics at the 1904 Summer Olympics programme. It was the third time the event was held. The competition was held on Saturday, September 3, 1904. Six athletes from two nations competed.

Sheridan and Rose tied for the lead, both throwing 39.28 metres to jointly set a new Olympic record. A throw-off determined the eventual champion. Sheridan won, becoming the second American champion in the men's discus throw after Robert Garrett in 1896. Nikolaos Georgantas of Greece took bronze, the nation's first medal since 1896.

== Background ==
This was the third appearance of the event, which is one of 12 athletics events to have been held at every Summer Olympics. The only returning competitor from 1900 was seventh-place finisher John Flanagan of the United States. Martin Sheridan (1904 AAU champion) and Ralph Rose (the 1904 Olympic shot put champion) of the United States and Nikolaos Georgantas of Greece were considered favorites.

No nations made their debut in the men's discus throw. Both of the nations competing in 1904, Greece and the United States, had also previously competed in both 1896 and 1900.

== Competition format ==
The format of the competition is unclear; it appears that each there was a single round of throwing with each thrower receiving six attempts. There was no provision at the time for breaking ties based on the second-best throw, so the tie for first place was broken with a three-throw throw-off.

== Records ==
These were the standing world and Olympic records (in metres) prior to the 1904 Summer Olympics.

World record	Marius Eynard (FRA)	43.21^{*}	Paris, France	2 May 1903
Olympic record	Rudolf Bauer (HUN)	36.04	Paris, France	14 July 1900

^{*} unofficial

The top four men all beat the Olympic record. At first Ralph Rose set a new Olympic record with 39.28 metres, later Martin Sheridan equalized his record.

== Schedule ==
Date	Time	Round
Saturday, 3 September 1904		Final

== Results ==
Rank	Athlete	Nation	Distance	Throw-off	Notes
1st place, gold medalist(s)	Martin Sheridan	United States	39.28 =OR	38.97	=OR
2nd place, silver medalist(s)	Ralph Rose	United States	39.28 OR	36.74	OR
3rd place, bronze medalist(s)	Nikolaos Georgantas	Greece	37.68		
4	John Flanagan	United States	36.14		
5	John Biller	United States	Unknown		
6	James Mitchel	United States	Unknown		

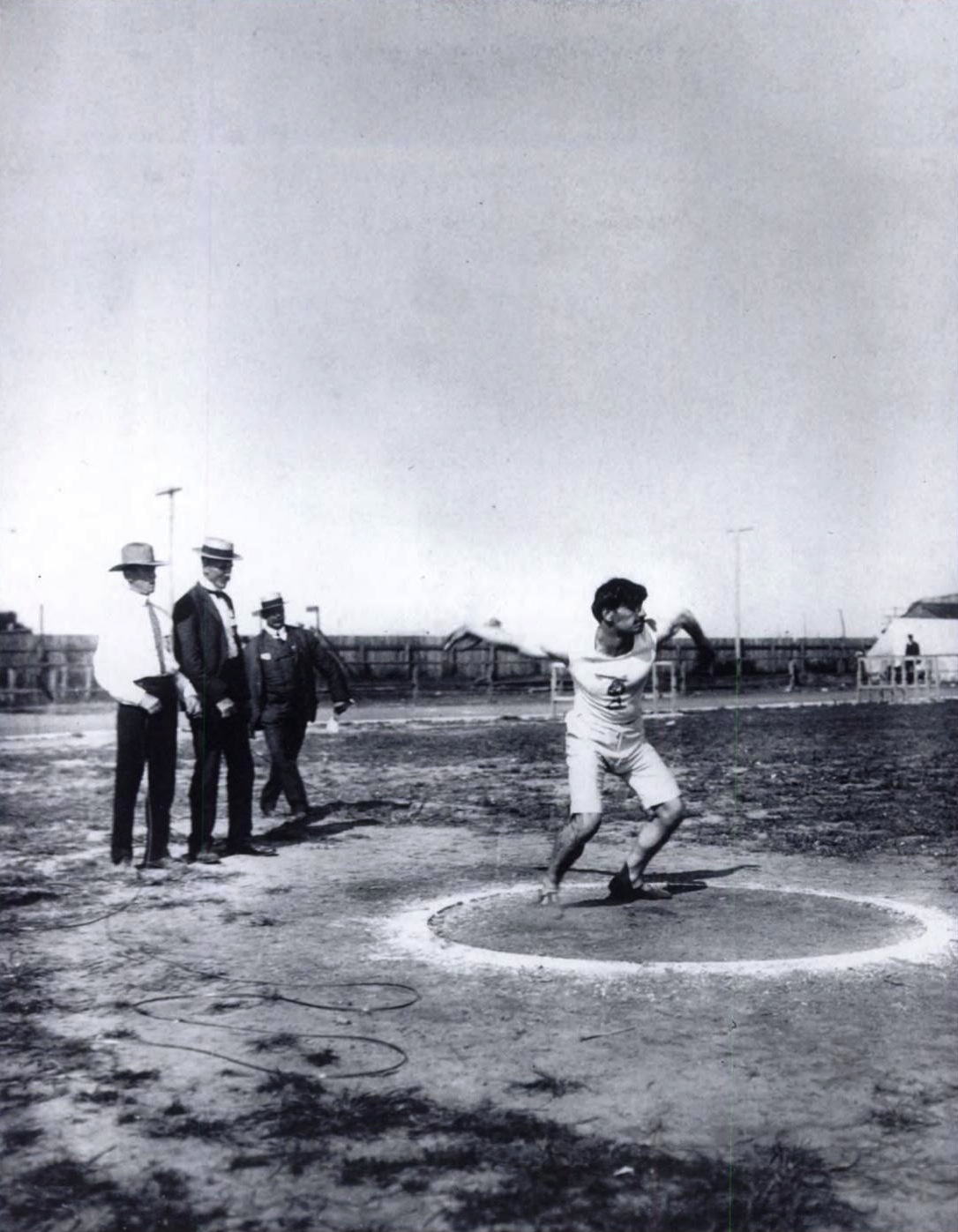
Nikolaos Georgantas throwing the discus on the way to finishing with the bronze.

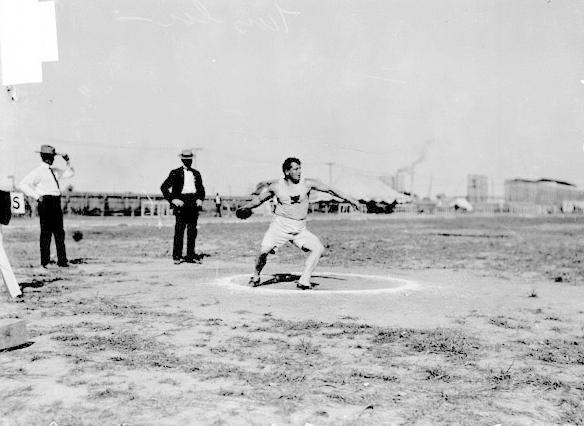
John Flanagan throwing the discus on the way to finishing in fourth place.

== Sources ==
- Wudarski, Pawel (1999). "Wyniki Igrzysk Olimpijskich" (in Polish).
