= Patrick Ryan (hammer thrower) =

American athlete

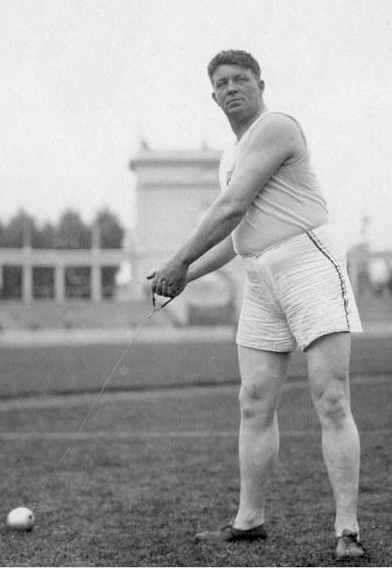
- Ryan at the 1920 Olympics

Personal information
- Born: Patrick Joseph Ryan; 20 January 1883 Bunavoy, Pallasgreen, County Limerick, Ireland
- Died: 13 February 1964 (aged 81) Limerick, Ireland
- Height: 1.88 m (6 ft 2 in)
- Weight: 113 kg (249 lb)

Sport
- Sport: Athletics
- Event: Hammer throw
- Club: Loughlin Lyceum

Achievements and titles
- Personal best: 57.77 m (1913)
Medal record
Representing the United States
Olympic Games
Gold medal – first place	1920 Antwerp	Hammer throw
Silver medal – second place	1920 Antwerp	56 lb weight throw

Patrick James Ryan (20 January 1883 – 13 February 1964) was an Irish American hammer thrower. He competed for the United States at the 1920 Summer Olympics and won a gold medal in the hammer throw and a silver in the 56-pound weight throw. In 1913 he established the first world record in the hammer throw, which stood as a world record for 25 years and as an American record for 40 years. Ryan was part of Irish weight throwers known as the Irish Whales.

== Biography ==
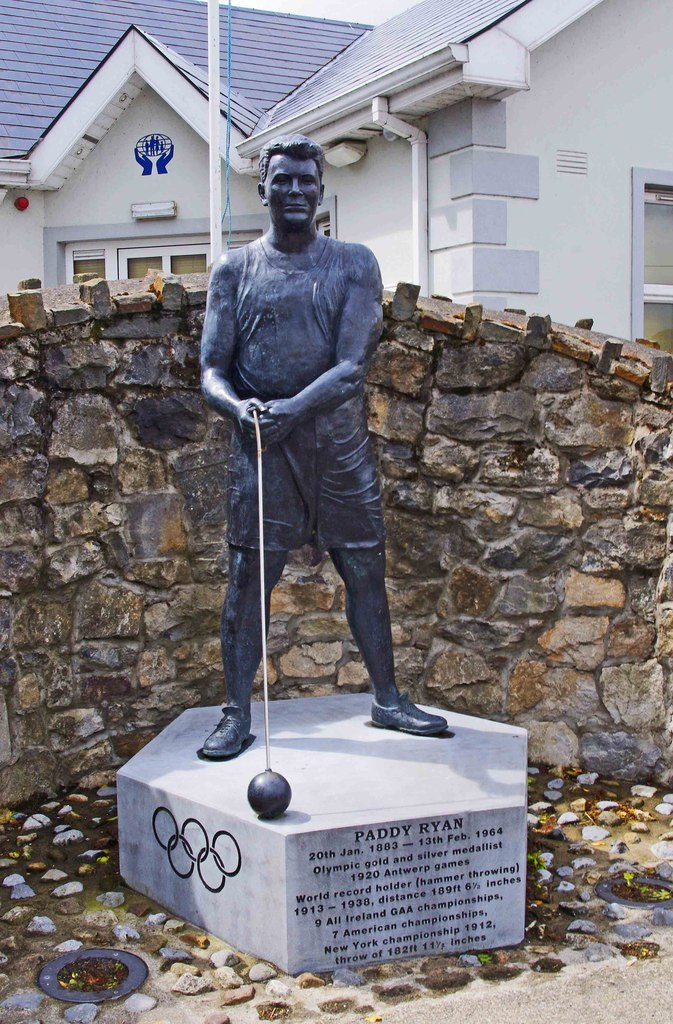
Statue of Paddy Ryan, Pallasgreen New, County Limerick. The inscription reads:- Paddy Ryan 20th Jan. 1883 - 13th Feb. 1964 Olympic Gold and Silver Medalist 1920 Antwerp games. World record holder (hammer throwing) 1913 - 1938, distance 189ft 6½ inches 9 All Ireland GAA championships, 7 American championships, New York championship 1912, throw of 182ft 11 1/2 inches

Born in County Limerick, Ireland, Ryan won his first Irish hammer title in 1902, beating the great Tom Kiely. In 1910 Ryan emigrated to the United States of America. After placing third in the 1911 AAU championship in his first year he improved to take second place in 1912, and won the title in 1913. With the exception of 1918 when he was in Europe with the American Armed Forces he won the AAU title every year from then up to and including 1921, when he retired.

While in New York City Ryan worked as a labour foreman with Consolidated Edison, Incorporated. He was a member of both the Irish American Athletic Club and the New York Athletic Club. He had not established citizenship in time for the 1912 Olympics in Stockholm, and so missed an opportunity. The following year, however, at the Eccentric Fireman’s Games, he established the first official IAAF world record for the event with a throw of 57.77 m (189 ft 6 in). This remained a world record for 25 years and an American record for forty years, being eventually beaten by Martin Engel in July 1953. He came close at the AAU on 26 June with a winning throw of 56.92 m (186 ft 9 in), but took the record with a throw of 59.54 m (195 ft 4 in) on 11 July 1953.

In 1920, Ryan got his chance at the Olympics and won the title, beating Carl Johan Lind of Sweden by over 4.4 m (14 ft). He also took a silver medal in the now-discontinued event of throwing a 56 lb. weight for distance, the only time this event was held at the Olympics. In 1924 he returned to Ireland to take over the family farm and remained there until his death in 1964.

Records
Preceded by —	Men's Hammer World Record Holder; 17 August 1913 – 4 September 1949	Succeeded by Erwin Blask
