= Carl Johan Lind =

Swedish hammer thrower

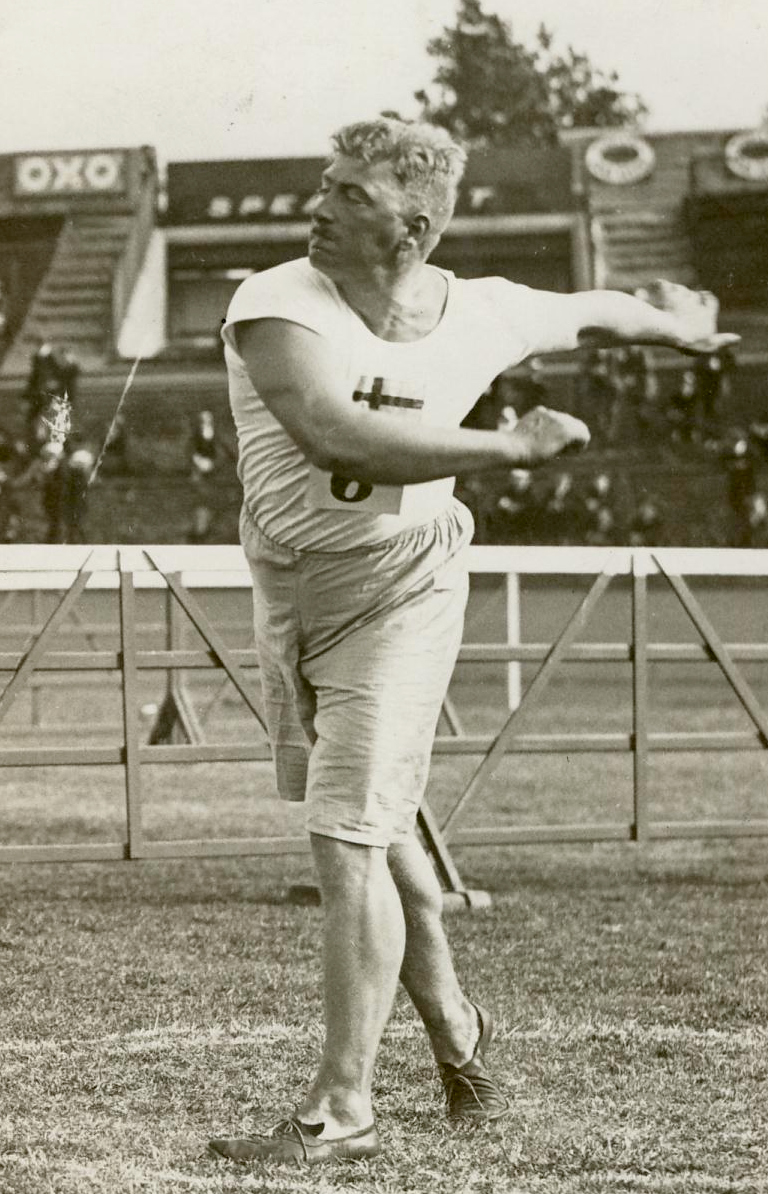

Personal information
- Born: 25 May 1883 Karlskoga, Sweden
- Died: 2 February 1965 (aged 85) Karlstad, Sweden
- Height: 1.76 m (5 ft 9 in)
- Weight: 102 kg (225 lb)

Sport
- Sport: Athletics
- Events: Discus throw, hammer throw, weight throw
- Club: IF Göta

Achievements and titles
- Personal bests: DT – 39.04 m (1912); HT – 52.51 m (1922); WT – 11.62 m (1925)
Medal record
Representing Sweden
Olympic Games
Silver medal – second place	1920 Antwerp	Hammer throw
Bronze medal – third place	1920 Antwerp	56 lb weight throw

Carl Johan "Massa" Lind (25 May 1883 – 2 February 1965) was a Swedish athlete who competed at the 1912, 1920, 1924 and 1928 Summer Olympics, missing the 1916 Games that were cancelled due to World War I.

== Career ==
Lind was selected to represent Sweden in his home Olympics in 1912 in Stockholm. He finished fifth in the hammer throw competition and eighth in the two handed discus throw event.

The following year, he won the British AAA Championships title in the hammer throw event at the 1913 AAA Championships. He successfully defended the title three more times in 1914, 1921 and 1922).

At the 1920 Summer Olympics, he has won a silver medal in the hammer throw and a bronze medal in the 56 lb weight throw, both times behind Patrick Ryan. At the 1924 and 1928 Games, he competed only in the hammer throw and finished 7th and 14th, respectively.

Lind won 17 Swedish titles in the hammer throw (1918–1924), weight throw (1918–19, 1921–1927) and discus throw (1910). In 1912, Lind set a national hammer throw record that stood for 15 years. Lind worked as a policeman in Karlstad and continued competing until the age of 50. he died in Sweden in 1965.
