= Tom Nicolson =

British hammer thrower and shot putter

Personal information
- Born: 3 October 1879 Tighnabruaich, Scotland
- Died: 18 April 1951 (aged 71) Glasgow, Scotland

Sport
- Sport: Athletics
- Event: Hammer / Shot put
- Club: West of Scotland Harriers, Kyles Athletic Shinty Club

Thomas Rae Nicolson (3 October 1879 – 18 April 1951) from Tighnabruaich was a British and Scottish track and field athlete who competed in the 1908 Summer Olympics and in the 1920 Summer Olympics.

== Biography ==
Nicolson became the National shot put champion and National hammer throw champion after winning the AAA Championships titles at the 1903 AAA Championships. He would go on to win the AAA Championships hammer title six times in total, with further successes coming in 1904, 1905, 1907, 1909, and 1912.

Nicolson represented Great Britain at the 1908 Summer Olympics in London, where he finished fourth in the hammer throw competition. He also participated in the shot put event, but his final ranking is unknown. Twelve years later, he finished sixth in the hammer throw competition.

Rae was a keen shinty player for Kyles Athletic, captaining the side alongside six of his brothers. He is believed to be the only shinty summer Olympian.
