= Athletics at the 1904 Summer Olympics – Men's 56 pound weight throw =

Men's 56 pound weight throw at the Games of the III Olympiad
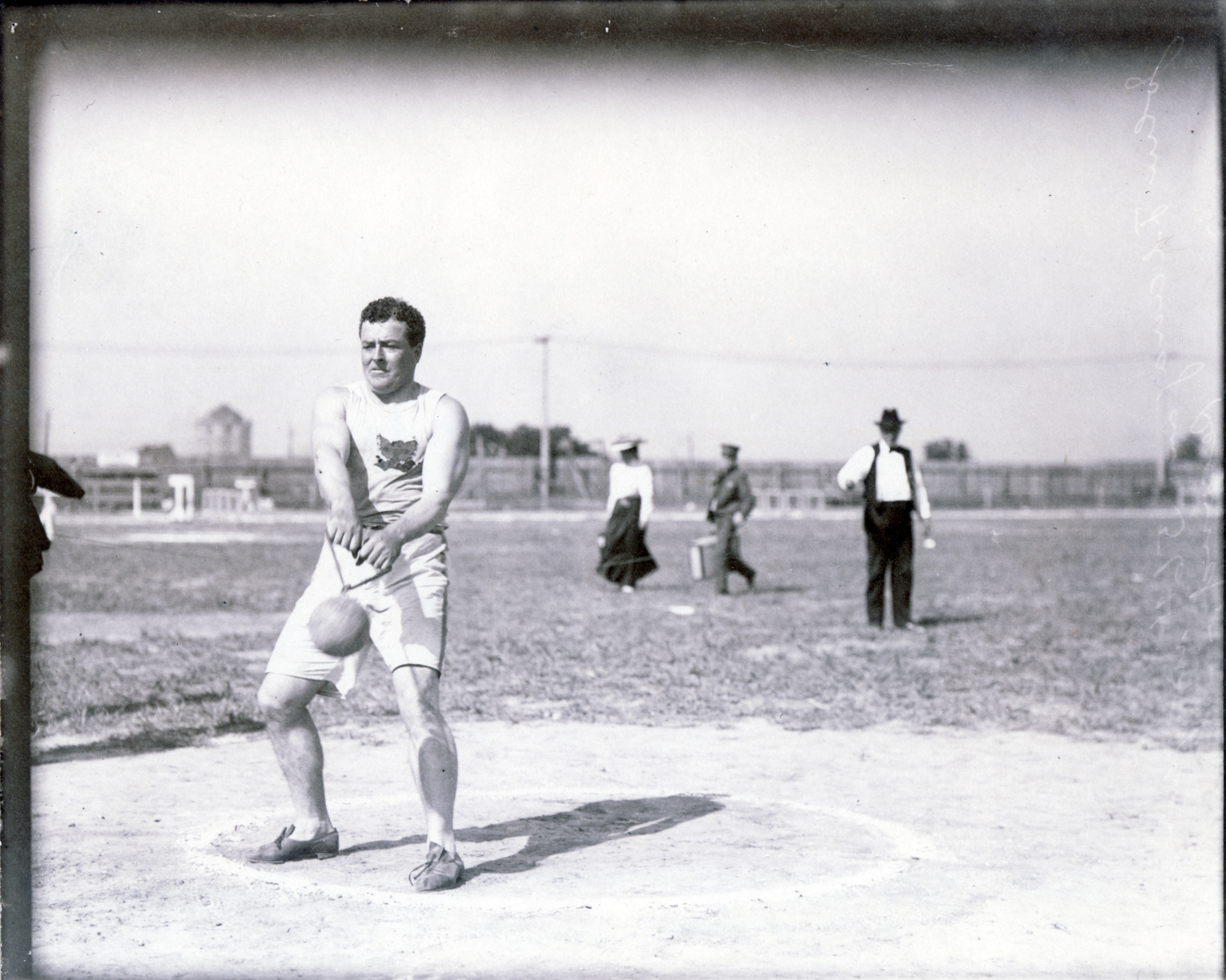
- Silver medalist John Flanagan
- Venue: Francis Field
- Date: 1 September 1904
- Competitors: 6 from 2 nations
- Winning distance: 10.46 OR

Medalists
1st place, gold medalist(s)		Étienne Desmarteau	Canada
2nd place, silver medalist(s)		John Flanagan	United States
3rd place, bronze medalist(s)		James Mitchel	United States

The men's 56 pound weight throw was a track and field athletics event held as part of the Athletics at the 1904 Summer Olympics programme. It was the first time the event was held. It would not appear on the Olympic program again until the 1920 Summer Olympics, which would be the last time the 56 pound (25.4 kg) weight was thrown in the Olympic Games. The competition was held on September 1, 1904. 6 athletes from 2 nations competed. The event was won by Étienne Desmarteau of Canada, one of only two gold medals (out of 25 events) in athletics won by an athlete not from the United States. Americans John Flanagan and James Mitchel took second and third, respectively.

== Background ==
This was the first of two appearances of the event, which was held again only in 1920. The favorites were John Flanagan of the United States and Étienne Desmarteau of Canada (making this one of the few athletics events with serious international competition). Flanagan was best known as a hammer thrower, having won the event at the 1900 Summer Olympics and, three days before this competition, repeated that victory in St. Louis. (He would win again at the 1908 Summer Olympics.) Desmarteau had won the only head-to-head competition between the two men, however, at the 1902 AAU championship.

== Competition format ==
The format of the competition is unclear. The throwing area was a seven-foot circle.

== Records ==
These were the standing world and Olympic records (in metres) prior to the 1904 Summer Olympics.

World record	John Flanagan (USA)	40 ft 2 in (12.24 m)^{*}		July 1904
Olympic record	New event	N/A	N/A	N/A

^{*} using unlimited run-and-follow

Étienne Desmarteau had the first legal mark of the competition (throwing second; Ralph Rose's first throw was a foul). That throw went 10.46 metres and was the winning mark and Olympic record at the end of the competition.

== Schedule ==
Date	Time	Round
Thursday, 1 September 1904		Final

== Results ==
Rank	Athlete	Nation	Distance	Notes
1st place, gold medalist(s)	Étienne Desmarteau	Canada	10.46	OR
2nd place, silver medalist(s)	John Flanagan	United States	10.16	
3rd place, bronze medalist(s)	James Mitchel	United States	10.13	
4	Charles Henneman	United States	9.18	
5	Charles Chadwick	United States	Unknown	
6	Ralph Rose	United States	8.53	(estimated)
—	Charles Dieges	United States	DNS	
—	Martin Sheridan	United States	DNS	

== Sources ==
- Wudarski, Pawel (1999). "Wyniki Igrzysk Olimpijskich" (in Polish).
