= Étienne Desmarteau =

Canadian athlete (1873–1905)

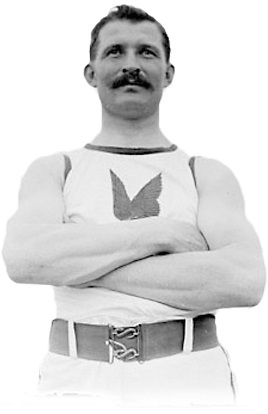

Personal information
- Full name: Joseph-Étienne Desmarteau
- Born: Joseph-Étienne Birtz; 4 February 1873 Boucherville, Quebec, Canada
- Died: 29 October 1905 (aged 32) Montreal, Quebec, Canada
- Height: 185 cm (6 ft 1 in)
- Weight: 94 kg (207 lb)
Medal record
Men's athletics
Representing Canada
Olympic Games
Gold medal – first place	1904 St. Louis	56 pound weight throw

Joseph-Étienne Desmarteau (4 February 1873 – 29 October 1905) was a Canadian athlete, winner of the weight throwing event at the 1904 Summer Olympics.

== Biography ==
Born in Boucherville, Quebec, Desmarteau was member of the Montréal Athletic Club was one of the top competitors in the 56 lb (25.4 kg) weight throwing event, which is no longer an Olympic event. In 1902 he had won the American AAU championships, beating John Flanagan. Flanagan broke the world record in the event prior to the 1904 Olympics, making him one of the favourites for the event along with Desmarteau.

To compete in the Olympics, Desmarteau, a fire officer in Montréal, had to ask for a leave of absence to go to St. Louis, but he was denied by his employer. He decided to go anyway, which cost him his job. In St. Louis, his first throw was 34 ft 4 in (10.46 m), enough for victory over Flanagan, who did not manage better than a 33 ft 4 in (10.16 m) throw. At the 1904 Olympics, Desmarteau was the only non-American to win in the field events.

Desmarteau received a hero's welcome back in Montréal and was rehired as a police officer. The following year, he died, possibly of typhoid fever.

A district, a park and a sports arena in Montréal have been named after him; the Étienne Desmarteau Centre was used as a venue for basketball during the 1976 Summer Olympics. The District d'Étienne Desmarteau is part of the borough of Rosemont–La Petite-Patrie.

It is contended that Desmarteau was the first Olympic Games champion from Canada, although 1900 Summer Olympics champion George Orton, who ran for an American university, was also Canadian.

== See also ==
- List of Canadian sports personalities
