= Robert Olsson =

Swedish hammer thrower

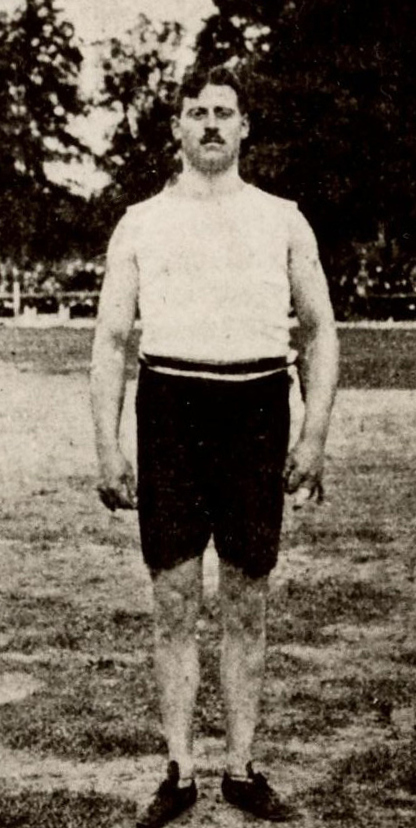

Personal information
- Born: 14 March 1883 Gothenburg, Sweden
- Died: 21 July 1954 (aged 71) Borås, Sweden

Sport
- Sport: Athletics
- Event: Hammer throw
- Club: Örgryte IS, Göteborg

Achievements and titles
- Personal best: 49.08 m (1915)

Carl Robert "Slägga" Olsson (14 March 1883 – 21 July 1954) was a Swedish hammer thrower. He competed at the 1908, 1912 and 1920 Summer Olympics with the best result of fourth place in 1908. He was the Swedish Olympic flag bearer at the 1912 Games.
