= France at the 1908 Summer Olympics =

- IOC code: FRA
- NOC: French Olympic Committee

in London
- Competitors: 363
- Medals Ranked 4th: Gold 5 Silver 5 Bronze 9 Total 19

Summer Olympics appearances (overview)
- 1896; 1900; ~~1904~~; 1908; 1912; 1920; 1924; 1928; 1932; 1936; 1948; 1952; 1956; 1960; 1964; 1968; 1972; 1976; 1980; 1984; 1988; 1992; 1996; 2000; 2004; 2008; 2012; 2016; 2020; 2024; 2028

Other related appearances
- 1906 Intercalated Games

France competed at the 1908 Summer Olympics in London, England.

== Medalists ==
France finished in fourth position in the final medal rankings, with five gold medals and 19 medals overall.

Medal	Name	Sport	Event	Date
Gold	Eugène Grisot	Archery	Men's Continental style	July 20
Gold	André Auffray, Maurice Schilles	Cycling	Men's tandem	July 15
Gold	Gaston Alibert	Fencing	Men's épée	July 24
Gold	Gaston Alibert, Herman Georges Berger, Charles Collignon, Eugène Olivier	Fencing	Men's team épée	July 24
Gold	Emile Thubron	Water motorsports	Class A	August 29
Silver	Louis Vernet	Archery	Men's Continental style	July 20
Silver	Géo André	Athletics	Men's high jump	July 21
Silver	Émile Demangel	Cycling	Men's 660 yd	July 15
Silver	Maurice Schilles	Cycling	Men's 5000 m	July 18
Silver	Alexandre Lippmann	Fencing	Men's épée	July 24
Bronze	Gustave Cabaret	Archery	Men's Continental style	July 20
Bronze	Joseph Dreher, Louis Bonniot de Fleurac, Paul Lizandier	Athletics	Men's 3 miles team race	July 15
Bronze	André Auffray	Cycling	Men's 5000 m	July 18
Bronze	Octave Lapize	Cycling	Men's 100 km	July 18
Bronze	Eugène Olivier	Fencing	Men's épée	July 24
Bronze	Louis Ségura	Gymnastics	Men's all-around	July 15
Bronze	Henri Arthus, Louis Potheau, Pierre Rabot	Sailing	6 m class	July 29
Bronze	Henri Bonnefoy, Paul Colas, Léon Lécuyer, André Regaud	Shooting	Men's team small-bore rifle	July 11
Bronze	Eugène Balme, Albert Courquin, Raoul de Boigne, Léon Johnson, Maurice Lecoq, André Parmentier	Shooting	Men's 300 m free rifle, team	July 10

== Results by event ==
=== Archery ===
The French team was one of three to take part in the archery competitions in 1908. They dominated the Continental style of archery, with the 15 French archers taking the top 11 places, as well as 13th, 14th, 16th, and 17th. The two non-French archers in the event, a Briton and an American, took 12th and 15th, respectively. The team did not do as well in the York rounds, with none of the 10 French archers who also competed in it placing better than 16th.

Event	Place	Archer	Score
Men's double York round	16th	Henri Berton	425
Men's double York round	17th	Eugène Richez	418
Men's double York round	19th	Eugène Grisot	410
Men's double York round	20th	Louis Vernet	385
Men's double York round	22nd	Louis Salingre	347
Men's double York round	23rd	Albert Dauchez	280
Men's double York round	24th	Charles Quervel	241
Men's double York round	25th	Edouard Beaudoin	215
Men's double York round	26th	Gustave Cabaret	191
Men's double York round	27th	Alfred Poupart	Did not finish
Men's Continental style	1st	Eugène Grisot	263
Men's Continental style	2nd	Louis Vernet	256
Men's Continental style	3rd	Gustave Cabaret	255
Men's Continental style	4th	Charles Aubras	231
Men's Continental style	5th	Charles Quervel	223
Men's Continental style	6th	Albert Dauchez	222
Men's Continental style	7th	Louis Salingre	215
Men's Continental style	8th	Henri Berton	212
Men's Continental style	9th	Eugène Richez	210
Men's Continental style	10th	Edouard Beaudoin	206
Men's Continental style	11th	Charles Vallée	193
Men's Continental style	13th	Émile Fisseux	185
Men's Continental style	14th	Jean Louis de la Croix	177
Men's Continental style	16th	Alfred Poupart	155
Men's Continental style	17th	Oscar Jay	134

=== Athletics ===
France's best athletics result was Géo André's silver medal in the high jump.

Event	Place	Athlete	Heats	Semifinals	Final
Men's 100 metres	Heats	Georges Malfait	11.2 seconds 2nd, heat 3	Did not advance	
Men's 100 metres	Heats	Louis Lesca	Unknown; 3rd, heat 6	Did not advance	
Men's 100 metres	Heats	Gaston Lamotte	Unknown; 3rd, heat 11	Did not advance	
Men's 100 metres	Heats	Henri Meslot	Unknown; 3rd, heat 13	Did not advance	
Men's 200 metres	Semi- finalist	Georges Malfait	22.6 seconds 1st, heat 5	Unknown; 3rd, semifinal 4	Did not advance
Men's 200 metres	Heats	Henri Meslot	Unknown; 2nd, heat 15	Did not advance	
Men's 400 metres	Semi- finalist	Georges Malfait	50.0 seconds 1st, heat 6	Unknown; 4th, semifinal 3	Did not advance
Men's 1500 metres	Semi- finalist	Jean Bouin	None held	Unknown; 2nd, semifinal 7	Did not advance
Men's 1500 metres	Semi- finalist	Joseph Dreher	None held	Unknown; 5th, semifinal 4	Did not advance
Men's 1500 metres	Semi- finalist	Louis Bonniot de Fleurac	None held	Unknown; 6th, semifinal 1	Did not advance
Men's 1500 metres	—	Gaston Ragueneau	None held	Did not finish —, semifinal 5	Did not advance
Men's 400 metre hurdles	Heats	Henri Meslot	Unknown; 2nd, heat 12	Did not advance	
Men's 400 metre hurdles	—	Georges Dubois	Did not finish —, heat 6	Did not advance	
Men's 3200 metre steeplechase	—	Gaston Ragueneau	None held	Did not finish —, semifinal 1	Did not advance
Men's 3200 metre steeplechase	—	Louis Bonniot de Fleurac	None held	Did not finish —, semifinal 2	Did not advance
Men's 3 mile team race	3rd	Louis Bonniot de Fleurac	None held	14:56.0; 4 points, team=15	15:08.4; 8 points, team=32
Men's 3 mile team race	3rd	Joseph Dreher	None held	15:37.2; 10 points, team=15	15:40.0; 11 points, team=32
Men's 3 mile team race	3rd	Paul Lizandier	None held	15:56.6; No score, team=15	16:03.0; 13 points, team=32
Men's 3 mile team race	No place	Jean Bouin	None held	14:53.0; 1 point, team=15	Did not start No score, team=32
Men's 3 mile team race	No place	Alexandre Fayollat	None held	15:52.2; No score, team=15	Did not start No score, team=32
Men's 5 miles	Semi- finalist	Paul Lizandier	None held	Unknown; 4th, semifinal 4	Did not advance
Men's 5 miles	—	Gaston Ragueneau	None held	Did not finish —, semifinal 1	Did not advance

Event	Place	Athlete	Height/ Distance
Men's high jump	2nd	Géo André	1.88 metres
Men's long jump	21-32	Henri Gutierrez	Unknown
Men's pole vault	10th	Robert Pascarel	3.20 metres
Men's pole vault	12th	G. Koeger	3.05 metres
Men's standing high jump	5th	Géo André	1.47 metres
Men's standing high jump	5th	Alfred Motté	1.47 metres
Men's standing high jump	19-23	Henri Jardin	Unknown
Men's standing long jump	8-25	Henri Jardin	Unknown
Men's standing long jump	8-25	Alfred Motté	Unknown
Men's shot put	9-25	Charles Lagarde	Unknown
Men's shot put	9-25	André Tison	Unknown
Men's discus throw	8th	André Tison	38.30 metres
Men's discus throw	12-42	Charles Lagarde	Unknown

=== Boxing ===
France competed in 4 of the 5 boxing events, not winning any bouts.

Weight class	Place	Boxer	Round of 16	Quarter- finals	Semi- finals	Final
Bantamweight; Up to 116 pounds	4th	Pierre Mazior	Not held	Lost to Condon; KO, 3rd round	Did not advance	
Featherweight; Up to 126 pounds	5th	Louis Constant	Not held	Lost to Ringer; 2-0 decision	Did not advance	
Featherweight; Up to 126 pounds	5th	Étienne Poillot	Not held	Lost to Gunn; KO, 2nd round	Did not advance	
Lightweight; Up to 140 pounds	7th	André Bouvier	Lost to Holmes; KO, 2nd round	Did not advance		
Middleweight; Up to 158 pounds	6th	Gaston Aspa	Lost to William Childs; KO, 2nd round	Did not advance		
Middleweight; Up to 158 pounds	6th	René Doudelle	Lost to Douglas; KO, 1st round	Did not advance		
Middleweight; Up to 158 pounds	6th	Charles Morard	Lost to Warnes; KO, 2nd round	Did not advance		

Opponent nation	Wins	Losses	Percent
Great Britain	0	7	.000
Total	0	7	.000

=== Cycling ===
France took one of the gold medals in cycling with a win in the men's tandem. Schilles also finished first in the men's sprint, but the final was voided due to the time limit having been exceeded.

Event	Place	Cyclist	Heats	Semifinals	Final
Men's 660 yards	2nd	Émile Demangel	59.8 seconds 1st, heat 6	51.6 seconds 1st, semifinal 2	Unknown
Men's 660 yards	Semi- finalist	André Auffray	58.4 seconds 1st, heat 16	Unknown; 2nd, semifinal 3	Did not advance
Men's 660 yards	Semi- finalist	Pierre Texier	1:01.6; 1st, heat 9	Unknown; 3rd, semifinal 1	Did not advance
Men's 660 yards	Heats	Georges Perrin	Unknown; 2nd, heat 10	Did not advance	
Men's 660 yards	Heats	André Poulain	Unknown; 2nd, heat 12	Did not advance	
Men's 660 yards	Heats	Gaston Dreyfus	Unknown; 2nd, heat 14	Did not advance	
Men's 660 yards	Heats	Pierre Seginaud	Unknown; 3rd, heat 2	Did not advance	
Men's 660 yards	Heats	Richard Villepontoux	Unknown; 3rd, heat 4	Did not advance	
Men's 660 yards	Heats	Gaston Delaplane	Unknown; 3rd, heat 8	Did not advance	
Men's 660 yards	Heats	Émile Marechal	Unknown; 3rd, heat 11	Did not advance	
Men's 660 yards	—	Maurice Schilles	Time limit exceeded —, heat 5	Did not advance	
Men's 5000 metres	2nd	Maurice Schilles	None held	7:55.4; 1st, semifinal 7	Unknown
Men's 5000 metres	3rd	André Auffray	None held	8:56.8; 1st, semifinal 3	Unknown
Men's 5000 metres	4th	Émile Marechal	None held	9:01.4; 1st, semifinal 2	Unknown
Men's 5000 metres	Semi- finalist	Pierre Texier	None held	Unknown; 3rd, semifinal 4	Did not advance
Men's 5000 metres	Semi- finalist	Pierre Seginaud	None held	Unknown; 4th, semifinal 1	Did not advance
Men's 5000 metres	Semi- finalist	Gaston Dreyfus	None held	Unknown; 4th, semifinal 6	Did not advance
Men's 5000 metres	Semi- finalist	Georges Perrin	None held	Unknown; 4–7, semifinal 7	Did not advance
Men's 5000 metres	Semi- finalist	Gaston Delaplane	None held	Unknown; 4–9, semifinal 5	Did not advance
Men's 5000 metres	Semi- finalist	Richard Villepontoux	None held	Unknown; 4–9, semifinal 5	Did not advance
Men's 5000 metres	—	André Poulain	None held	Did not finish —, semifinal 4	Did not advance
Men's 5000 metres	—	Émile Demangel	None held	Disqualified —, semifinal 2	Did not advance
Men's 20 kilometres	5-9	François Bonnet	None held	Unknown; 6th, semifinal 2	Unknown
Men's 20 kilometres	5-9	Octave Lapize	None held	Unknown; 4th, semifinal 4	Unknown
Men's 20 kilometres	Semi- finalist	C. Avrillon	None held	33:40.8; 2nd, semifinal 6	Did not advance
Men's 20 kilometres	Semi- finalist	André Lapize	None held	Unknown; 4th, semifinal 1	Did not advance
Men's 20 kilometres	Semi- finalist	G. C. Lutz	None held	Unknown; 4th, semifinal 2	Did not advance
Men's 20 kilometres	Semi- finalist	Henri Baumler	None held	Unknown; 5th, semifinal 4	Did not advance
Men's 20 kilometres	Semi- finalist	H. Cunault	None held	Unknown; 6–7, semifinal 3	Did not advance
Men's 20 kilometres	Semi- finalist	Pierre Hostein	None held	Unknown; 7–8, semifinal 1	Did not advance
Men's 20 kilometres	—	Pierre Texier	None held	Did not finish —, semifinal 5	Did not advance
Men's 100 kilometres	3rd	Octave Lapize	None held	Unknown; 4th, semifinal 2	Unknown
Men's 100 kilometres	5th	Pierre Texier	None held	Unknown; 4th, semifinal 1	Unknown
Men's 100 kilometres	9-17	François Bonnet	None held	Unknown; 7-14, semifinal 1	Did not finish
Men's 100 kilometres	9-17	G. C. Lutz	None held	Unknown; 2nd, semifinal 1	Did not finish
Men's 100 kilometres	Semi- finalist	André Lepere	None held	Unknown; 7–14, semifinal 1	Did not advance
Men's 100 kilometres	—	Charles Avrillon	None held	Did not finish —, semifinal 2	Did not advance
Men's 100 kilometres	—	H. Cunault	None held	Did not finish —, semifinal 2	Did not advance
Men's 100 kilometres	—	Pierre Hostein	None held	Did not finish —, semifinal 2	Did not advance
Men's 100 kilometres	—	Jean Madelaine	None held	Did not finish —, semifinal 2	Did not advance
Men's sprint	Finalist	Maurice Schilles	1:38.4; 1st, heat 3	1:38.8; 1st, semifinal 2	Time limit exceeded
Men's sprint	Semi- finalist	Émile Demangel	1:35.2; 1st, heat 9	Unknown; 2nd, semifinal 3	Did not advance
Men's sprint	Semi- finalist	André Auffray	1:23.6; 1st, heat 10	Unknown; 3rd, semifinal 4	Did not advance
Men's sprint	Semi- finalist	Pierre Texier	1:31.0; 1st, heat 13	Unknown; 4th, semifinal 1	Did not advance
Men's sprint	Heats	André Poulain	Unknown; 2nd, heat 2	Did not advance	
Men's sprint	Heats	Pierre Seginaud	Unknown; 2nd, heat 4	Did not advance	
Men's sprint	Heats	Richard Villepontoux	Unknown; 2nd, heat 7	Did not advance	
Men's sprint	Heats	Émile Marechal	Unknown; 2nd, heat 12	Did not advance	
Men's sprint	Heats	Gaston Delaplane	Unknown; 2nd, heat 15	Did not advance	
Men's sprint	Heats	Gaston Dreyfus	Unknown; 4th, heat 8	Did not advance	
Men's sprint	—	Georges Perrin	Time limit exceeded —, heat 16	Did not advance	
Men's tandem	1st	André Auffray; Maurice Schilles	3:11.4; 1st, heat 5	2:46.2; 1st, semifinal 2	3:07.6
Men's tandem	Semi- finalist	François Bonnet; Octave Lapize	3:06.8; 1st, heat 6	Unknown; 4th, semifinal 2	Did not advance
Men's tandem	Heats	Maurice Texier; Pierre Texier	Unknown; 2nd, heat 2	Did not advance	
Men's tandem	Heats	Charles Avrillon; Joseph Guyader	Unknown; 2nd, heat 3	Did not advance	
Men's tandem	Heats	Gaston Dreyfus; André Poulain	Unknown; 2nd, heat 7	Did not advance	
Men's team pursuit	Heats	André Auffray; Émile Demangel; Émile Marechal; Maurice Schilles	2:32.0; 2nd, heat 4	Did not advance	

=== Fencing ===
France swept the épée competitions, taking all three individual medals and the team gold.

Event	Place	Fencer	First round	Second round	Semi- final	Final
Men's épée	1st	Gaston Alibert	7-1 (1st in E)	4-0 (1st in 3)	7-2 (1st in 1)	7–2
Men's épée	2nd	Alexandre Lippmann	4-1 (1st in L)	4-1 (1st in 5)	5-4 (3rd in 2)	5–3
Men's épée	3rd	Eugène Olivier	3-2 (3rd in J)	2-1 (1st in 8)	5-4 (3rd in 2)	4–3
Men's épée	Semi- finalist	Henri-Georges Berger	7-0 (1st in D)	3-2 (2nd in 3)	4-5 (5th in 1)	Did not advance
Men's épée	Semi- finalist	Jean Stern	4-1 (1st in M)	4-2 (2nd in 1)	3-4 (5th in 2)	Did not advance
Men's épée	Second round	Jacques Rodocanachi	3-3 (3rd in H)	2-2 (3rd in 2)	Did not advance	
Men's épée	Second round	Bernard Gravier	4-2 (2nd in A)	2-2 (3rd in 4)	Did not advance	
Men's épée	Second round	Charles Collignon	5-2 (2nd in B)	1-3 (3rd in 6)	Did not advance	
Men's épée	Second round	Robert Quennessen	5-3 (2nd in I)	1-2 (3rd in 8)	Did not advance	
Men's épée	Second round	Jacques Marais	5-0 (1st in C)	1-3 (5th in 4)	Did not advance	
Men's épée	First round	Frédéric Dubourdieu	4-3 (4th in G)	Did not advance		
Men's sabre	7th	Georges de la Falaise	3-1 (1st in F)	2-1 (1st in 8)	4-3 (3rd in 1)	1–6
Men's sabre	Semi- finalist	Bertrand Marie de Lesseps	4-1 (1st in H)	3-0 (1st in 4)	1-6 (8th in 1)	Did not advance
Men's sabre	Second round	Georges Lateux	2-2 (2nd in D)	1-3 (5th in 1)	Did not advance	
Men's sabre	First round	Jean de Mas Latrie	2-3 (4th in A)	Did not advance		
Men's sabre	First round	Louis Renaud	3-2 (4th in C)	Did not advance		
Men's sabre	First round	Georges Langevin	0-3 (4th in E)	Did not advance		
Men's sabre	First round	Frédéric Chapuis	3-2 (4th in L)	Did not advance		
Men's sabre	First round	Marc Perrodon	3-2 (4th in M)	Did not advance		
Men's sabre	First round	Ismaël de Lesseps	1-4 (5th in G)	Did not advance		
Men's sabre	First round	Joseph, Marquis de Saint Brisson	0-5 (6th in I)	Did not advance		
Men's sabre	First round	Jean Mikorski	2-5 (8th in J)	Did not advance		

Event	Place	Fencers	Play-in match	First round	Semi- finals	Final	Repechage	Silver medal match
Men's team épée	1st	Gaston Alibert (1st, sf, f); Henri-Georges Berger (sf); Charles Collignon (sf); Eugène Olivier (sf, f) Bernard Gravier (1st, f); Alexandre Lippmann (1st, f); Jean Stern (1st)	Bye	Defeated Denmark; 10-6 Advanced to semifinals	Defeated Great Britain; 12-5 Advanced to final	Defeated Belgium; 9-7 Won gold medal	Not relegated	
Men's team sabre	4th	Georges de la Falaise; Bertrand Marie de Lesseps; Marc Perrodon; Louis Renaud	Not held	Defeated Belgium; 10-6 Advanced to semifinals	Lost to Bohemia; 9-7 Out; 4th place	Did not advance	Not relegated	

=== Football ===
France was represented by the two national squads of France national football team & France B national football team. Each faced Denmark in its first match, with France coming off the loser both times.

Event	Place	Players	First round	Semifinals	Final	Bronze match
Men's football	4th	Georges-Henri Albert, Georges Bayrou, Gaston Cypres, Jean Dubly, René Fenouillière, André François (captain), Charles Renaux, Émile Sartorius, Louis Schubart, Maurice Tillette, Ursule Wibaut, Oscar Desaulty, Julien du Rhéart, Jean Zimmermann, and Gabriel Hanot	Bye	Lost vs. Denmark; 17-1	Did not advance	Not relegated
Men's football	6th	Pierre Six, Raoul Gressier, Justin Vialaret, Charles Bilot, Sadi Dastarac, Victor Denis, François Desrousseaux, Robert Eucher, Adrien Filez, Henri Holgard, Albert Jenicot, Georges Prouvost, Paul Mathaux, Étienne Morillon, Jules Verlet (captain)	Lost vs. Denmark; 9-0	did not advance		Not relegated

=== Gymnastics ===
Gymnast	Event	Score	Rank
Louis Ségura	Men's all-around	297	3rd place, bronze medalist(s)
Marcel Lalu	Men's all-around	258.75	7
Raphaël Diaz	Men's all-around	258.5	8
Jules Rolland	Men's all-around	249.5	10
François Nidal	Men's all-around	249	11
Antoine Costa	Men's all-around	241.75	14
Georges Turnheer	Men's all-around	232	18
Jean Castigliano	Men's all-around	227	20
Justinien Lux	Men's all-around	226	22
Dominique Follacci	Men's all-around	222	26
Georges Charmoille	Men's all-around	222	26
Alfred Castille	Men's all-around	220	28
Ferdinand Castille	Men's all-around	218	30
Victor Dubois	Men's all-around	212.5	32
Paulin Lemaire	Men's all-around	207.25	35
G. Mounier	Men's all-around	204.5	38
E. Gauthier	Men's all-around	195	43
F. Lekim	Men's all-around	180.5	53
Georges Ratelot	Men's all-around	172.75	57
Edouard Boislevé	Men's all-around	120	89
Lucien Bogart; Albert Borizée; Henri de Breyne; Nicolas Constant; Charles Courtois; Louis Delattre; A. Delecluse; Louis Delecluse; Georges Demarle; Joseph Derou; Charles Desmarcheliers; Camille Desmarcheliers; Édmond Dharancy; Georges Donnet; Émile Duhamel; A. Duponcheel; Paul Durin; A. Eggremont; G. Guiot; L. Hennebicq; Henri Hubert; Désiré Hudelo; E. Labitte; L. Lestienne; R. Lis; Victor Magnier; G. Nys; Joseph Parent; Louis Pappe; V. Polidori; Gustave Pottier; Antoine Pinoy; Louis Sandray; Émile Schmoll; Émile Steffe; E. Vercruysse; Hugo Vergin; E. Vicogne; Jules Walmée; G. Warlouzer	Men's team	319	5

=== Hockey ===
Event	Place	Players	First round	Semifinals	Final	5th/6th
Men's hockey	6th	R. P. Aublin, D. Baidet, R. Benoit, André Bonnal, L. Gautier, D. M. Girard, C. Pattin, L. Poupon, F. Roux, René Salarnier, L. Saulnier, Fernand Versini	Lost vs. GBR England; 10-1	Did not advance		Lost vs. Germany; 1–0

Opponent nation	Wins	Losses	Percent
Germany	0	1	.000
Great Britain	0	1	.000
Total	0	2	.000

=== Sailing ===
Class	Place	Boat	Sailors
6 metre	3rd	Guyoni	Henri Arthus, Louis Potheau, Pierre Rabot

=== Shooting ===
Event	Place	Shooter	Score
Men's 1000 yard free rifle	19th	Raoul de Boigne	86
Men's 1000 yard free rifle	23rd	André Angelini	85
Men's 1000 yard free rifle	28th	Paul Colas	82
Men's 1000 yard free rifle	35th	Léon Hecht	75
Men's 1000 yard free rifle	38th	Daniel Merillon	69
Men's 1000 yard free rifle	39th	Léon Moreaux	67
Men's 1000 yard free rifle	48th	Léon Tétart	21
Men's 300 metre free rifle	8th	Léon Johnson	835
Men's 300 metre free rifle	25th	Paul Colas	759
Men's 300 metre free rifle	31st	Maurice Lecoq	730
Men's 300 metre free rifle	34th	André Angelini	706
Men's team free rifle	3rd	Léon Johnson; Eugène Balme; André Parmentier; Albert Courquin; Maurice Lecoq; Raoul de Boigne	4652
Men's team military rifle	4th	Raoul de Boigne; Albert Courquin; Eugène Balme; Daniel Mérillon; Léon Hecht; André Parmentier	2227
Men's stationary target small-bore rifle	13th	André Mercier	366
Men's stationary target small-bore rifle	17th	Léon Tétart	350
Men's stationary target small-bore rifle	19th	Henri Bonnefoy	304
Men's moving target small-bore rifle	10th	Léon Johnson	13
Men's moving target small-bore rifle	14th	André Mercier	10
Men's moving target small-bore rifle	15th	Léon Tétart	9
Men's disappearing target small-bore rifle	19th	André Mercier	30
Men's disappearing target small-bore rifle	21st	Léon Johnson	24
Men's disappearing target small-bore rifle	22nd	Léon Tétart	21
Men's team small-bore rifle	3rd	Paul Colas; André Regaud; Léon Lécuyer; Henri Bonnefoy	710
Men's single-shot running deer	13th	Léon Tétart	11
Men's single-shot running deer	14th	Maurice Robion du Pont	6
Men's single-shot running deer	15th	André Barbillat	3
Men's double-shot running deer	12th	Léon Tétart	21
Men's double-shot running deer	14th	Maurice Robion du Pont	18
Men's individual pistol	6th	André Barbillat	466
Men's individual pistol	10th	André Regaud	451
Men's individual pistol	17th	Léon Moreaux	438
Men's individual pistol	22nd	Jean Depassis	427
Men's individual pistol	30th	Léon Lécuyer	401
Men's individual pistol	34th	Maurice Robion du Pont	391
Men's team pistol	4th	André Barbillat; André Regaud; Léon Moreaux; Jean Depassis	1750
Men's individual trap shooting	23rd	Emile Béjot	28

=== Swimming ===
Event	Place	Swimmer	Heats	Semifinals	Final
Men's 100 metre freestyle	Heats	Gérard Meister	Unknown; 3–5, heat 2	Did not advance	
Men's 100 metre freestyle	Heats	René André	Unknown; 4–5, heat 5	Did not advance	
Men's 400 metre freestyle	—	Henri Decoin	Did not finish —, heat 1	Did not advance	
Men's 1500 metre freestyle	Heats	André Theuriet	32:37.0; 3rd, heat 4	Did not advance	

=== Tennis ===
Event	Place	Name	Round of 64	Round of 32	Round of 16	Quarter- finals	Semi- finals	Final
Men's singles	5th	Maurice Germot	Bye	Defeated Schomburgk	Bye	Lost to Ritchie	Did not advance	

Opponent nation	Wins	Losses	Percent
Germany	1	0	1.000
Great Britain	0	1	.000
Total	1	1	.500

=== Water motorsports ===
France had one boat enter competition in the motorboating events, winning a gold medal when that boat ended up being the only finisher in the open class.

Event	Place	Boat	Sailors	Result
Class A — Open class	1st	Camille	Emile Thubron; 3 other crew members	Did not start (first race); Finished (second race)
