= Fencing at the 1908 Summer Olympics – Men's sabre =

Fencing at the Olympics

Men's sabre at the Games of the IV Olympiad
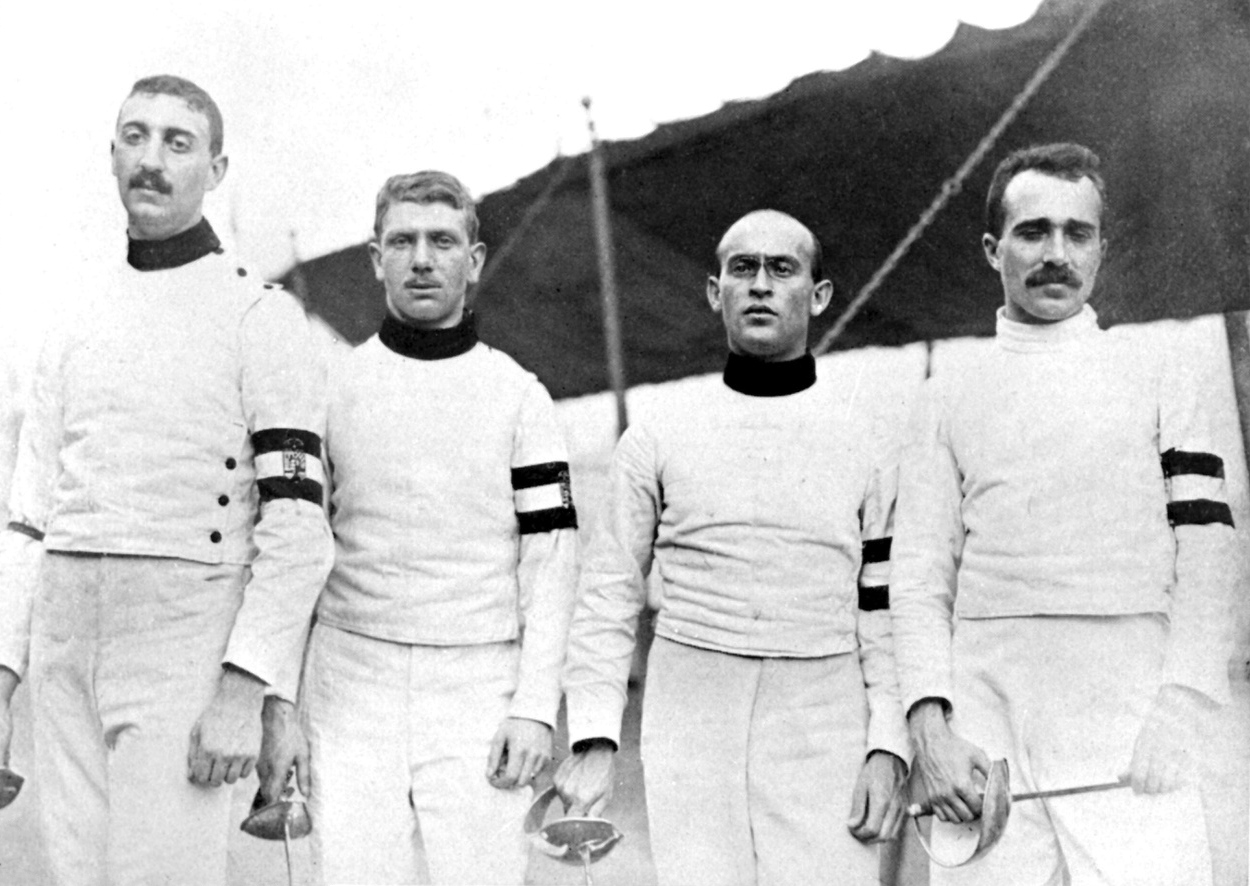
- Hungarian fencers Lajos Werkner, Oszkar Gerde, Jenö Fuchs, and Péter Tóth
- Venue: Franco-British Exhibition fencing grounds
- Dates: July 17–24, 1908
- Competitors: 76 from 11 nations

Medalists
| 1st place, gold medalist(s) | | Jenő Fuchs | Hungary |
| 2nd place, silver medalist(s) | | Béla Zulawszky | Hungary |
| 3rd place, bronze medalist(s) | | Vilém Goppold von Lobsdorf | Bohemia |

The men's sabre was one of four fencing events on the Fencing at the 1908 Summer Olympics programme. The top two places were won by Hungarian fencers, who also took the gold medal in the team sabre event. Jenő Fuchs took the gold medal and Béla Zulawszky the silver. Bronze went to Bohemian Vilém Goppold von Lobsdorf. There were 76 competitors from 11 nations. Each nation could enter up to 12 fencers.

== Background ==
This was the fourth appearance of the event, which is the only fencing event to have been held at every Summer Olympics. The 1900 gold medalist, Georges de la Falaise of France, returned after not competing in 1904.

Belgium, Bohemia, Great Britain, the Netherlands, and South Africa each made their debut in the men's sabre. Austria made its third appearance in the event, most of any nation, having missed only the 1904 Games in St. Louis.

== Competition format ==
The competition was held over four rounds. In each round, each pool held a round-robin, with bouts to 3 touches. European sabre rules at the time used a target area of the whole body, in contrast to above-the-waist target area provided for by the American rules of the time, used in the 1904 Games, and which became standard after World War I. Barrages were used as necessary to determine the advancing fencers.

- First round: 13 pools of between 4 and 8 fencers each. The 3 fencers in each pool with the fewest bouts lost advanced to the second round.
- Quarterfinals: 8 pools of 5 fencers each (except one had only 4 by design and one had only 4 due to a non-starter). The 2 fencers in each pool with the fewest bouts lost advanced to the semifinals.
- Semifinals: 2 pools of 8 fencers each. The 4 fencers in each pool with the fewest bouts lost advanced to the final.
- Final: 1 pool of 8 fencers.

== Schedule ==
| Date | Time | Round |
|---|---|---|
| Friday, 17 July 1908 | | Round 1 pools A–D |
| Saturday, 18 July 1908 | 14:30; 16:00; 17:30 | Round 1 pools E–G; Round 1 pools H–K; Round 1 pools L–M |
| Monday, 20 July 1908 | 11:30; 16:15 | Quarterfinals A–D; Quarterfinals E–H |
| Thursday, 23 July 1908 | 10:30; 16:00 | Semifinal A Semifinal B |
| Friday, 24 July 1908 | 14:45 | Final |

== Results ==
=== Round 1 ===
The first round was conducted in round-robin format, to three touches. Pool sizes ranged from 4 to 8 fencers. The three contestants who had lost the fewest bouts advanced.

==== Pool A ====
| Rank | Fencer | Nation | Wins | Losses | Notes |
|---|---|---|---|---|---|
| 1 | Siegfried Flesch | Austria | 5 | 0 | Q |
| 2 | Jetze Doorman | Netherlands | 3 | 2 | Q |
| 2 | Vlastimil Lada-Sázavský | Bohemia | 3 | 2 | Q |
| 4 | Jean de Mas Latrie | France | 2 | 3 | |
| 5 | Henri Six | Belgium | 1 | 4 | |
| 5 | Jaroslav Šourek-Tucek | Bohemia | 1 | 4 | |

==== Pool B ====
The three-way tie for the two remaining places resulted in the British fencer being eliminated.

| Rank | Fencer | Nation | Wins | Losses | Notes |
|---|---|---|---|---|---|
| 1 | Otakar Lada | Bohemia | 3 | 1 | Q |
| 2 | Archibald Murray | Great Britain | 2 | 2 | B |
| 2 | Péter Tóth | Hungary | 2 | 2 | B |
| 2 | Joseph van der Voodt | Belgium | 2 | 2 | B |
| 5 | Johannes Adam | Germany | 1 | 3 | |

Barrage B

| Rank | Fencer | Nation | Wins | Losses | Notes |
|---|---|---|---|---|---|
| 2 | Péter Tóth | Hungary | 1 | 0 | Q |
| 2 | Joseph van der Voodt | Belgium | 1 | 0 | Q |
| 4 | Archibald Murray | Great Britain | 0 | 2 | |

==== Pool C ====
Renaud lost both his playoff matches, eliminating him and allowing Grade and Jack to advance.

| Rank | Fencer | Nation | Wins | Losses | Notes |
|---|---|---|---|---|---|
| 1 | Alfred Labouchere | Netherlands | 4 | 1 | Q |
| 2 | Etienne Grade | Belgium | 3 | 2 | B |
| 2 | Fritz Jack | Germany | 3 | 2 | B |
| 2 | Louis Renaud | France | 3 | 2 | B |
| 5 | Dino Diana | Italy | 2 | 3 | |
| 6 | Douglas Godfree | Great Britain | 0 | 5 | |

Barrage C

| Rank | Fencer | Nation | Wins | Losses | Notes |
|---|---|---|---|---|---|
| 2 | Etienne Grade | Belgium | 1 | 0 | Q |
| 2 | Fritz Jack | Germany | 1 | 0 | Q |
| 4 | Louis Renaud | France | 0 | 2 | |

==== Pool D ====
The playoff resulted in two losses for Lichtenfels.

| Rank | Fencer | Nation | Wins | Losses | Notes |
|---|---|---|---|---|---|
| 1 | William Marsh | Great Britain | 3 | 1 | Q |
| 2 | Georges Lateux | France | 2 | 2 | B |
| 2 | Julius Lichtenfels | Germany | 2 | 2 | B |
| 2 | Richard Schoemaker | Netherlands | 2 | 2 | B |
| 5 | Harald Krenchel | Denmark | 1 | 3 | |

Barrage D

| Rank | Fencer | Nation | Wins | Losses | Notes |
|---|---|---|---|---|---|
| 2 | Georges Lateux | France | 1 | 0 | Q |
| 2 | Richard Schoemaker | Netherlands | 1 | 0 | Q |
| 4 | Julius Lichtenfels | Germany | 0 | 2 | |

==== Pool E ====
The fifth pool was small, with only 4 fencers. This meant only one, Langevin, was eliminated.

| Rank | Fencer | Nation | Wins | Losses | Notes |
|---|---|---|---|---|---|
| 1 | Adrianus de Jong | Netherlands | 2 | 1 | Q |
| 1 | Alessandro Pirzio Biroli | Italy | 2 | 1 | Q |
| 1 | Einar Schwartz-Nielsen | Denmark | 2 | 1 | Q |
| 4 | Georges Langevin | France | 0 | 3 | |

==== Pool F ====
Petri defeated van Tomme in the playoff for third place after having lost to the Belgian in the main pool.

| Rank | Fencer | Nation | Wins | Losses | Notes |
|---|---|---|---|---|---|
| 1 | Georges de la Falaise | France | 3 | 1 | Q |
| 1 | Jenő Szántay | Hungary | 3 | 1 | Q |
| 3 | August Petri | Germany | 2 | 2 | B |
| 3 | Antoine van Tomme | Belgium | 2 | 2 | B |
| 5 | Jacob van Löben Sels | Netherlands | 0 | 4 | |

Barrage F

| Rank | Fencer | Nation | Wins | Losses | Notes |
|---|---|---|---|---|---|
| 3 | August Petri | Germany | 1 | 0 | Q |
| 4 | Antoine van Tomme | Belgium | 0 | 1 | |

==== Pool G ====
Badman defeated van Minden again in the playoff for third place.

| Rank | Fencer | Nation | Wins | Losses | Notes |
|---|---|---|---|---|---|
| 1 | Dezső Földes | Hungary | 5 | 0 | Q |
| 2 | Sante Ceccherini | Italy | 4 | 1 | Q |
| 3 | Robert Badman | Great Britain | 2 | 3 | B |
| 3 | Lion van Minden | Netherlands | 2 | 3 | B |
| 5 | Jakob Erkrath de Bary | Germany | 1 | 4 | |
| 5 | Ismaël de Lesseps | France | 1 | 4 | |

Barrage G

| Rank | Fencer | Nation | Wins | Losses | Notes |
|---|---|---|---|---|---|
| 3 | Robert Badman | Great Britain | 1 | 0 | Q |
| 4 | Lion van Minden | Netherlands | 0 | 1 | |

==== Pool H ====
| Rank | Fencer | Nation | Wins | Losses | Notes |
|---|---|---|---|---|---|
| 1 | Marcello Bertinetti | Italy | 4 | 1 | Q |
| 1 | Bertrand Marie de Lesseps | France | 4 | 1 | Q |
| 3 | Béla Zulawszky | Hungary | 3 | 2 | Q |
| 4 | Robert Krünert | Germany | 2 | 3 | |
| 4 | Charles Wilson | Great Britain | 2 | 3 | |
| 6 | Walter Gates | South Africa | 0 | 5 | |

==== Pool I ====
| Rank | Fencer | Nation | Wins | Losses | Notes |
|---|---|---|---|---|---|
| 1 | Oszkár Gerde | Hungary | 4 | 1 | Q |
| 1 | Lauritz Østrup | Denmark | 4 | 1 | Q |
| 3 | Willem van Blijenburgh | Netherlands | 3 | 2 | Q |
| 4 | André du Bosch | Belgium | 2 | 3 | |
| 4 | Alfred Keene | Great Britain | 2 | 3 | |
| 6 | Joseph, Marquis de Saint Brisson | France | 0 | 5 | |

==== Pool J ====
The tenth pool was the largest, at fully twice the size of the fifth. Five of the eight fencers were eliminated. The Bohemian fencer, von Lobsdorf, defeated each of his seven opponents for a decisive first place in the pool. There was no match between Sarzano and Stohr.

| Rank | Fencer | Nation | Wins | Losses | Notes |
|---|---|---|---|---|---|
| 1 | Vilém Goppold von Lobsdorf | Bohemia | 7 | 0 | Q |
| 2 | Paul Anspach | Belgium | 5 | 2 | Q |
| 2 | Jenő Apáthy | Hungary | 5 | 2 | Q |
| 4 | Edward Brookfield | Great Britain | 3 | 4 | |
| 4 | Johan van Schreven | Netherlands | 3 | 4 | |
| 6 | Pietro Sarzano | Italy | 2 | 4 | |
| 6 | Georg Stöhr | Germany | 2 | 4 | |
| 8 | Jean Mikorski | France | 2 | 5 | |

==== Pool K ====
| Rank | Fencer | Nation | Wins | Losses | Notes |
|---|---|---|---|---|---|
| 1 | Jenő Fuchs | Hungary | 5 | 0 | Q |
| 2 | Gustaaf van Hulstijn | Netherlands | 4 | 1 | Q |
| 3 | Vilém Tvrzský | Bohemia | 3 | 2 | Q |
| 4 | Luigi Pinelli | Italy | 2 | 3 | |
| 5 | Ernst Moldenhauer | Germany | 1 | 4 | |
| 6 | Lockhart Leith | Great Britain | 0 | 5 | |

==== Pool L ====
Chapuis was eliminated in the three-way playoff for second and third.

| Rank | Fencer | Nation | Wins | Losses | Notes |
|---|---|---|---|---|---|
| 1 | George van Rossem | Netherlands | 4 | 1 | Q |
| 2 | Charles Notley | Great Britain | 3 | 2 | B |
| 2 | Bedrich Schejbal | Bohemia | 3 | 2 | B |
| 2 | Frédéric Chapuis | France | 3 | 2 | B |
| 5 | Alexandre Simonson | Belgium | 2 | 3 | |
| 6 | Albert Naumann | Germany | 0 | 5 | |

Barrage L

| Rank | Fencer | Nation | Notes |
|---|---|---|---|
| 2 | C. Barry Notley | Great Britain | Q |
| 2 | Bedrich Schejbal | Bohemia | Q |
| 4 | Louis Chapuis | France | |

==== Pool M ====
The final pool was one of the larger pools, with 7 fencers.

| Rank | Fencer | Nation | Wins | Losses | Notes |
|---|---|---|---|---|---|
| 1 | Lajos Werkner | Hungary | 5 | 1 | Q |
| 2 | Riccardo Nowak | Italy | 4 | 2 | Q |
| 2 | Emil Schön | Germany | 4 | 2 | Q |
| 4 | Marc Perrodon | France | 3 | 3 | |
| 5 | Jan de Beaufort | Netherlands | 2 | 4 | |
| 5 | František Dušek | Bohemia | 2 | 4 | |
| 7 | Alfred Chalke | Great Britain | 1 | 5 | |

=== Quarterfinals ===
There were eight second round pools, ranging in size from 4 to 5.

==== Quarterfinal 1 ====
Notley's pair of victories in the playoff gave him second in the pool, allowing him to advance.

| Rank | Fencer | Nation | Wins | Losses | Notes |
|---|---|---|---|---|---|
| 1 | Jenő Fuchs | Hungary | 3 | 1 | Q |
| 2 | Etienne Grade | Belgium | 2 | 2 | B |
| 2 | C. Barry Notley | Great Britain | 2 | 2 | B |
| 2 | Richard Schoemaker | Netherlands | 2 | 2 | B |
| 5 | Georges Lateux | France | 1 | 3 | |

Barrage 1

| Rank | Fencer | Nation | Wins | Losses | Notes |
|---|---|---|---|---|---|
| 2 | C. Barry Notley | Great Britain | 2 | 0 | Q |
| 3 | Etienne Grade | Belgium | 0 | 1 | |
| 3 | Richard Schoemaker | Netherlands | 0 | 1 | |

==== Quarterfinal 2 ====
| Rank | Fencer | Nation | Wins | Losses | Notes |
|---|---|---|---|---|---|
| 1 | Lajos Werkner | Hungary | 4 | 0 | Q |
| 2 | Dezső Földes | Hungary | 3 | 1 | Q |
| 3 | George van Rossem | Netherlands | 2 | 2 | |
| 4 | Robert Badman | Great Britain | 1 | 3 | |
| 5 | Fritz Jack | Germany | 1 | 3 | |

==== Quarterfinal 3 ====
| Rank | Fencer | Nation | Wins | Losses | Notes |
|---|---|---|---|---|---|
| 1 | Vilém Goppold von Lobsdorf | Bohemia | 3 | 1 | Q |
| 1 | Joseph van der Voodt | Belgium | 3 | 1 | Q |
| 3 | William Marsh | Great Britain | 2 | 2 | |
| 4 | Adrianus de Jong | Netherlands | 1 | 3 | |
| 4 | Riccardo Nowak | Italy | 1 | 3 | |

==== Quarterfinal 4 ====
| Rank | Fencer | Nation | Wins | Losses | Notes |
|---|---|---|---|---|---|
| 1 | Bertrand Marie de Lesseps | France | 3 | 0 | Q |
| 2 | Béla Zulawszky | Hungary | 2 | 1 | Q |
| 3 | Bedrich Schejbal | Bohemia | 1 | 2 | |
| 4 | Vilém Tvrzský | Bohemia | 0 | 3 | |
| — | Gustaaf van Hulstijn | Netherlands | DNS | | |

==== Quarterfinal 5 ====
| Rank | Fencer | Nation | Wins | Losses | Notes |
|---|---|---|---|---|---|
| 1 | Oszkar Gerde | Hungary | 4 | 0 | Q |
| 2 | Sante Ceccherini | Italy | 3 | 1 | Q |
| 3 | Otakar Lada | Bohemia | 2 | 2 | |
| 4 | Emil Schön | Germany | 1 | 3 | |
| 5 | Paul Anspach | Belgium | 0 | 4 | |

==== Quarterfinal 6 ====
| Rank | Fencer | Nation | Wins | Losses | Notes |
|---|---|---|---|---|---|
| 1 | Péter Tóth | Hungary | 4 | 0 | Q |
| 2 | Jenő Szántay | Hungary | 3 | 1 | Q |
| 3 | Willem van Blijenburgh | Netherlands | 1 | 3 | |
| 3 | Siegfried Flesch | Austria | 1 | 3 | |
| 3 | Alfred Labouchere | Netherlands | 1 | 3 | |

==== Quarterfinal 7 ====
Doorman, who had lost to Petri in the main pool, defeated the German in the playoff for second place.

| Rank | Fencer | Nation | Wins | Losses | Notes |
|---|---|---|---|---|---|
| 1 | Marcello Bertinetti | Italy | 4 | 0 | Q |
| 2 | Jetze Doorman | Netherlands | 2 | 2 | B |
| 2 | August Petri | Germany | 2 | 2 | B |
| 4 | Vlastimil Lada-Sázavský | Bohemia | 1 | 3 | |
| 4 | Alessandro Pirzio Biroli | Italy | 1 | 3 | |

Barrage 7

| Rank | Fencer | Nation | Wins | Losses | Notes |
|---|---|---|---|---|---|
| 2 | Jetze Doorman | Netherlands | 1 | 0 | Q |
| 3 | August Petri | Germany | 0 | 1 | |

==== Quarterfinal 8 ====
| Rank | Fencer | Nation | Wins | Losses | Notes |
|---|---|---|---|---|---|
| 1 | Jenő Apáthy | Hungary | 2 | 1 | B |
| 1 | Georges de la Falaise | France | 2 | 1 | B |
| 1 | Lauritz Østrup | Denmark | 2 | 1 | B |
| 4 | Einar Schwartz-Nielsen | Denmark | 0 | 3 | |

Barrage 8

| Rank | Fencer | Nation | Wins | Losses | Notes |
|---|---|---|---|---|---|
| 1 | Georges de la Falaise | France | 2 | 0 | Q |
| 2 | Lauritz Østrup | Denmark | 1 | 1 | Q |
| 3 | Jenő Apáthy | Hungary | 0 | 2 | |

=== Semifinals ===
There were two semifinals, each of 8 fencers. The top 4 in each advanced to the final.

==== Semifinal 1 ====
| Rank | Fencer | Nation | Wins | Losses | Notes |
|---|---|---|---|---|---|
| 1 | Jenő Fuchs | Hungary | 6 | 1 | Q |
| 2 | Lajos Werkner | Hungary | 5 | 2 | Q |
| 3 | Georges de la Falaise | France | 4 | 3 | Q |
| 3 | Jenő Szántay | Hungary | 4 | 3 | Q |
| 5 | Marcello Bertinetti | Italy | 3 | 4 | |
| 5 | Dezső Földes | Hungary | 3 | 4 | |
| 7 | C. Barry Notley | Great Britain | 2 | 5 | |
| 8 | Bertrand Marie de Lesseps | France | 1 | 6 | |

==== Semifinal 2 ====
Four fencers tied at 5-2 records, all advancing to the finals. Ceccherini gave up after his first four bouts, giving Tóth, van der Voodt, and Doorman wins by walkover.

| Rank | Fencer | Nation | Wins | Losses | Notes |
|---|---|---|---|---|---|
| 1 | Jetze Doorman | Netherlands | 5 | 2 | Q |
| 1 | Vilém Goppold von Lobsdorf | Bohemia | 5 | 2 | Q |
| 1 | Péter Tóth | Hungary | 5 | 2 | Q |
| 1 | Béla Zulawszky | Hungary | 5 | 2 | Q |
| 5 | Oszkár Gerde | Hungary | 4 | 3 | |
| 6 | Lauritz Østrup | Denmark | 3 | 4 | |
| 7 | Joseph van der Voodt | Belgium | 1 | 6 | |
| 8 | Sante Ceccherini | Italy | 0 | 7 | |

=== Final ===
Fuchs and de Lobsdorf did not finish within the time limit, resulting in a loss for both of them. The playoff match for the gold medal was won by Fuchs, with the one-touch bout decided by a parry and riposte to his fellow Hungarian's head.

| Rank | Fencer | Nation | Wins | Losses |
|---|---|---|---|---|
| 1 | Jenő Fuchs | Hungary | 6 | 1 |
| 1 | Béla Zulawszky | Hungary | 6 | 1 |
| 3rd place, bronze medalist(s) | Vilém Goppold von Lobsdorf | Bohemia | 4 | 3 |
| 4 | Jenő Szántay | Hungary | 3 | 4 |
| 5 | Péter Tóth | Hungary | 3 | 4 |
| 6 | Lajos Werkner | Hungary | 2 | 5 |
| 7 | Jetze Doorman | Netherlands | 1 | 6 |
| 7 | Georges de la Falaise | France | 1 | 6 |

Barrage

| Rank | Fencer | Nation | Wins | Losses |
|---|---|---|---|---|
| 1st place, gold medalist(s) | Jenő Fuchs | Hungary | 1 | 0 |
| 2nd place, silver medalist(s) | Béla Zulawszky | Hungary | 0 | 1 |

== Sources ==
- Cook, Theodore Andrea (1908). The Fourth Olympiad, Being the Official Report. London: British Olympic Association.
- De Wael, Herman. Herman's Full Olympians: "Fencing 1908". Accessed 1 May 2006. Available electronically at.
