= René Camard =

French footballer (1887–1915)

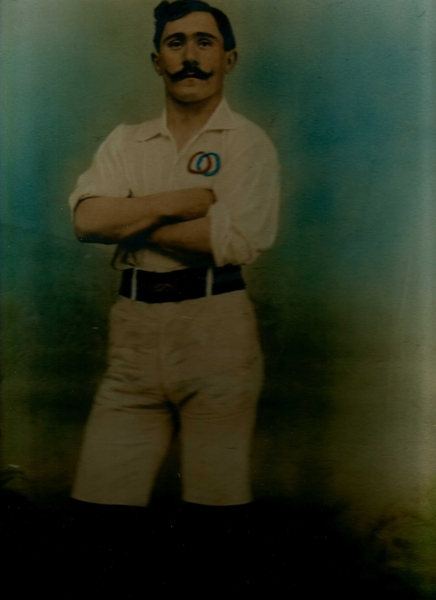

Personal information
- Full name: René Baptiste Camard
- Date of birth: 8 February 1887
- Place of birth: 7th arrondissement of Paris, France
- Date of death: 16 March 1915 (aged 28)
- Place of death: Carnoy, France
- Height: 1.57 m (5 ft 2 in)
- Position: Forward

Senior career*
Years	Team	Apps	(Gls)
1903–1906	Red Star AC		
1907–1914	AS Française		
- Le Havre

International career
1907	France	1	(0)
1907–1913	Paris	+5	(1)
1909	France (unofficial)	1	(0)
- * Club domestic league appearances and goals

René Baptiste Camard (8 February 1887 – 16 March 1915) was a French footballer who played as a forward for Red Star AC and AS Française in the early 20th century. He also played one match for the France national team in 1907.

== Early life and education ==
René Camard was born in the 7th arrondissement of Paris on 8 February 1887, as the son of Jean-Baptiste (1857–1912) and Elisabeth Marie Lasserre. He quickly devoted himself to sports, excelling in several of them, such as running, shooting, athletic competitions, swimming, cycling, Basque pelota, and especially football, becoming a member of Red Star FC in 1903, aged 16. However, he did not neglect his studies, obtaining his primary school certificate, a certificate of studies from the teachers' association, and a diploma from the Voltaire college in Paris.

== Club career ==
At the time, Red Star played in the second division of the USFSA Paris championship, but his growing fame had earned him requests from several first division clubs, which attempting to attract him in exchange for benefits (in kind or in cash), the beginnings of a professionalism already developed in England, but still rejected with horror in France, so when Camard's hesitation became public knowledge, he was briefly criticized of selling his services to the highest bidder by Ernest Weber, the star football journalist of L'Auto (the future L'Équipe). In the end, he joined the ranks of AS Française.

Camard helped AS Française win the 1908 Coupe Manier, which was awarded to the team composed of at least eight French players with the highest ranking in the USFSA Paris championship. On 18 April 1909, Camard started in the final of the Coupe Dewar in 1909 at Stade de Charentonneau, which ended in a 5–0 loss to Gallia Club. On 5 March 1911, he played an international match against English club Weybridge, in which he started a counter-attack that resulted in his side's opening goal in an eventual 4–1 win.

In the late 1900s, Camard was called up to do his military service in the 129th Infantry Regiment of Le Havre, and on 9 January 1910, the football team of the 129th Regiment faced the 39th Regiment of Rouen in the opening match of the 1910 USFSA Military Championship, and Camard, then a corporal, assisted two goals to Rémy in an eventual 4–0 win. During the final of the 3rd Army Corps Military Championship, Camard scored 5 goals to help the 129th Regiment team to a 12–0 win over the 28th Regiment. During his military service in Le Havre, he played a few matches for Le Havre.

His playing style as a winger was often praised by the French press, stating "his runs, always finished with very judiciously placed crosses, made him worthy of the attention of the center-forward at all times". In 1912, Camard was the captain of the AS Française team that won the USFSA Paris championship, and this victory qualified the club for the USFSA national championship, helping his side to a 3–1 win over US Saint-Malo in the quarterfinals on 31 March, in which he scored a header despite being only 1.57 meters tall, and in which "Camard was quite simply marvelous; although very marked by Cadoret, he made some nice runs. It was he who made the ASF triumph". In the final against Stade raphaëlois at Stade Colombes on 28 April, Camard scored a penalty kick to make it 1–1 and force extra-time in which his side lost 2–1. Three years later, on 22 February 1914, Camard helped AS Française claim its second USFSA Paris championship.

== International career ==
On 21 April 1907, shortly after his move to AS Française, the 20-year-old Camard earned his first and last international cap in a friendly match against Belgium at Uccle, playing the game as a left winger, and helping André François to score the winning goal by pushing, with the help of fellow one-time international Georges Bon, the Belgian goalkeeper Robert Hustin into his goal. From 1907 onwards, Camard was regularly selected for the Paris football team against the Nord (1911 and 1913), London XI (1910 and 1912), and the English Wanderers (1913), but for the four France matches in 1908, it was Gabriel Hanot who was preferred to him in a time when the French team was mainly made up of northerners, since the head coach André Billy was from the North. Either way, the USFSA selected him for the would-be France C squad that was originally listed to compete in the football tournament of the 1908 Olympic Games in London, but he ended up not traveling there because the USFSA decided to send only two instead of three teams.

On 18 March 1909, he played an unofficial match between USFSA's France and AFA's England, replacing Hanot, who forfeited, but neither he nor France's other winger Robert Eucher were able cross the line of the English backs as France lost 8–0. In the 1911 Paris-Nord meeting, an annual test match for the French national team, he scored a left-footed shot from 15 meters in a 3–1 loss.

== Later life and death ==
Outside of football, Camard was a sales representative, and on 29 March 1913, he married Inès Moreau at the town hall of the 9th arrondissement of Paris.

When the First World War broke out, Sergeant René Camard joined the 329th Regiment, and on 28 August 1914, during the Great Retreat of the 1st Army, he was wounded by a shrapnel bullet in the shoulder in Guise, before being fatally injured in combat on 16 March 1915, in the Carnoy sector. He died while encouraging his men during the fight for possession of a funnel dug by an enemy mine furnace.

A few days later, the Croix de Guerre was awarded to him posthumously.

== Honours ==
AS Française

- USFSA Paris Championship:
  - Champions (2): 1911–12 and 1913–14
- USFSA Football Championship:
  - Runner-up (1): 1912
- Coupe Manier:
  - Champions (1): 1908
- Coupe Dewar:
  - Runner-up (1): 1909
