= List of Olympic venues in rugby =

List of Olympic venues in rugby may refer to:

- List of Olympic venues in rugby sevens, disputed first time in 2016
- List of Olympic venues in rugby union, disputed in 1900, 1908, 1920 and 1924
