= Archery at the 1908 Summer Olympics – Men's double York round =

Archery at the Olympics

Men's double York round at the Games of the IV Olympiad
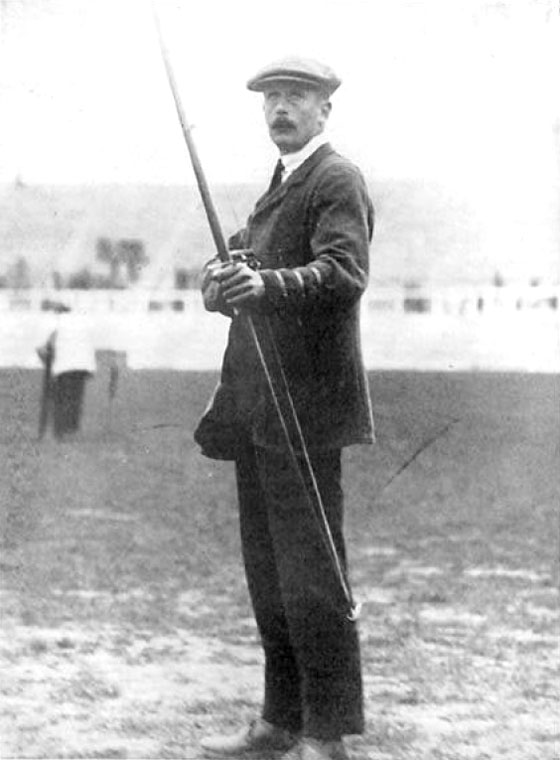
- Gold medalist William Dod in competition during the men's double York round.
- Venue: White City Stadium
- Dates: 17–18 July
- Competitors: 27 from 3 nations

Medalists
1st place, gold medalist(s)		William Dod	Great Britain
2nd place, silver medalist(s)		Reginald Brooks-King	Great Britain
3rd place, bronze medalist(s)		Henry B. Richardson	United States

The men's double York round was one of three archery events on the archery at the 1908 Summer Olympics programme. Arrows were shot in ends (or groups) of three. The archers shot a total of 288 arrows each, with 144 arrows in each of the two rounds. The competition was held on Friday, 17 July and Saturday, 18 July, with one round each day. The archers had to contend with significant rain and wind on the first day, and gusts of wind on the second.

William Dod won the competition to best his sister Lottie Dod's result; she won the silver medal in the women's competition. Dod's victory was "pretty clear" by the end of the 80-yard portion of the second round, with him having established a significant lead with only 24 arrows left at 60 yards. The United States' only archer won a bronze medal in this competition, preventing Great Britain from sweeping this event as they did the women's competition. France swept the Continental-style event. Henry B. Richardson had the best single-round score of the competition (417 in the second round) but had been well behind the leaders after the first round. Despite starting the second day 50 points behind Reginald Brooks-King, Richardson nearly caught the other man for second place with 3 arrows remaining. (down only 1 point, 749 to 748) However, Brooks-King pulled away again on the last end, 19–12, for a "close and exciting finish." Ten French archers competed in the York round, though none finished higher than 16th place.

Twenty-seven archers from three nations competed. Five additional archers (4 from France, 1 from the United States) entered but did not start. NOCs were limited to 30 competitors each, though none came close to this maximum.

== Background ==
This was the second and final appearance of the event, which was previously held in 1904.

Dod was not favoured. Reginald Brooks-King had won five British national titles since 1900 (1900, 1902, 1903, 1906, and 1908) with John Penrose, John Bridges, Eyre Hussey (not competing at the London Games), and Hugh Nesham each taking one of the remaining four.

== Competition format ==
Each round consisted of 72 arrows at 100 yards (91 m), 48 arrows at 80 yards (73 m), and 24 arrows at 60 yards (55 m). Three arrows were shot per end. Each hit was worth 9, 7, 5, 3, or 1 point(s) depending on which ring was hit; an arrow touching two rings would count as hitting the higher value. Ties were broken, in order, by number of hits, by score at the longest range (100 yards), then by hits at the longest range.

== Schedule ==
The double York round event was held on the first two days of the archery schedule, along with the women's double National round.

Legend

F	Final

Event	17 July	18 July	19 July	20 July
Men's double York round	F			
Men's Continental style				F
Women's double National round	F			

== Results ==
Rank	Archer	Nation	Score
1st place, gold medalist(s)	William Dod	Great Britain	815
2nd place, silver medalist(s)	Reginald Brooks-King	Great Britain	768
3rd place, bronze medalist(s)	Henry B. Richardson	United States	760
4	John Penrose	Great Britain	709
5	John Bridges	Great Britain	687
6	Harold James	Great Britain	652
7	Theodore Robinson	Great Britain	647
8	Hugh Nesham	Great Britain	643
9	John Keyworth	Great Britain	622
10	Charles Keene	Great Britain	543
11	Capel Pownall	Great Britain	532
12	John Stopford	Great Britain	530
13	Robert Backhouse	Great Britain	516
14	Robert Heathcote	Great Britain	476
15	Geoffrey Cornewall	Great Britain	430
16	Henri Berton	France	425
17	Eugène Richez	France	418
18	Charles Coates	Great Britain	413
19	Eugène Grisot	France	410
20	Louis Vernet	France	385
21	Richard Bagnall-Oakeley	Great Britain	374
22	Louis-Albert Salingré	France	347
23	Albert Dauchez	France	280
24	Charles Quervel	France	241
25	Édouard Beaudoin	France	215
26	Gustave Cabaret	France	191
27	Alfred Poupart	France	36 (DNF)

== Sources ==
- Official Report of the Games of the IV Olympiad (1908).
- De Wael, Herman. Herman's Full Olympians: "Archery 1908". Accessed 8 April 2006. Available electronically at.
