= Oscar Desaulty =

French footballer

Personal information
- Place of birth: France
- Position: Defender

Senior career*
Years	Team	Apps	(Gls)
1905–1914	AS Française		

International career
1908	France	0	(0)
- * Club domestic league appearances and goals

Oscar Desaulty was a French footballer who played as a defender for AS Française in the early 20th century. He was also a member of the French football squad that competed in the football tournament of the 1908 Olympic Games in London, but he did not play in any matches.

== Playing career ==
Very little is known about his life; Desaulty was playing football for AS Française as soon as October 1905. Three years later, on 5 April 1908, he started in the final of the 1908 Coupe Dewar, which ended in a 2–1 loss to CA Paris. Shortly after, he helped his team win its first-ever trophy, the Coupe Manier, which was awarded to the team composed of at least eight French players with the highest ranking in the USFSA Paris championship. Later that year, the USFSA selected him for the French national team, being a member of the French squad that competed in the football tournament of the 1908 Olympic Games in London, but he failed to feature in a single game as France was knocked out in the semifinals by Denmark following a resounding 17–1 loss.

On 18 April 1909, Desaulty started in the final of the Coupe Dewar in 1909 at Stade de Charentonneau, which ended in a 5–0 loss to Gallia Club. On 5 March 1911, Desaulty played an international match against English club Weybridge, helping his side to a 4–1 win. In 1912, he helped AS Française win the USFSA Paris championship, and this victory qualified the club for the USFSA national championship, helping his side reach the final at Stade Colombes on 28 April, which ended in a 2–1 loss to Stade raphaëlois. He started both of these finals as a defender alongside Fernand Massip, conceding a total of seven goals. Two years later, on 22 February 1914, Desaulty helped AS Française claim its second USFSA Paris championship.

== Honours ==
AS Française

- USFSA Paris Championship:
  - Champions (2): 1911–12 and 1913–14
- USFSA Football Championship:
  - Runner-up (1): 1912
- Coupe Manier:
  - Champions (1): 1908
- Coupe Dewar:
  - Runner-up (2): 1908 and 1909
