= Keyworth (surname) =

Keyworth is a surname. Notable people with the surname include:

- Andrew Stanley Keyworth (1923–1996), New Zealand mariner
- George A. Keyworth II (1939–2017), American physicist
- Gwyneth Keyworth (born 1990), Welsh actress
- Henry Keyworth Raine (1872–1934), British portraitist
- John Keyworth (1859–1954), British archer
- John Keyworth Boynton (11918–2007), British legal officer
- Jon Keyworth (born 1950), American football player
- Ken Keyworth (1934–2000), British football player
- Leonard James Keyworth (1893–1915), English recipient of the Victoria Cross
- Mark Keyworth (1948–2014), English rugby player
- Sarah Keyworth (born 1993), English stand-up comedian
