= Szántai =

Szántai or Szántay is a Hungarian surname. Notable people with the name include:

- János Szántay (1922–2007), Romanian-Hungarian fencer and physician
- Jenő Szántay (1881–1914), Hungarian fencer
- Levente Szántai (born 1982), Hungarian footballer
