= Jacolliot =

Jacolliot is a French surname. Notable people with the surname include:

- Louis Jacolliot (1837–1890), French barrister, colonial judge, author, and lecturer.
- René Jacolliot (1892–1968), French footballer
