= John Penrose (disambiguation) =

John Penrose (born 1964) is the British Conservative Member of Parliament (MP) for Weston-super-Mare.

John Penrose may also refer to:

- John Penrose (MP for Liskeard), in 1411, MP for Liskeard (parliamentary borough)
- John Penrose (Parliamentarian) (born 1611), English politician
- John Penrose (priest) (1778–1859), clergyman and theological writer
- John Penrose (archer) (1850–1932), British Olympic archer
- John Penrose (actor) (1914–1983), British actor
- John Penrose (journalist), British journalist, former husband of Anne Robinson
