= Archery at the 1908 Summer Olympics =

Coordinates: 51.5136°N 0.2274°E

Archery at the Games of the IV Olympiad
- Venue: White City Stadium
- Dates: 17–20 July 1908
- No. of events: 3 (2 men, 1 women)
- Competitors: 57 from 3 nations

At the 1908 Summer Olympics, three archery events were contested. Great Britain sent 41 archers, France sent 15, and the United States sent one. Great Britain was the only nation to enter athletes in the women's event, guaranteeing them a medals sweep.

== Medal summary ==
Official 1908 Highlight Film Archery @ 1:46

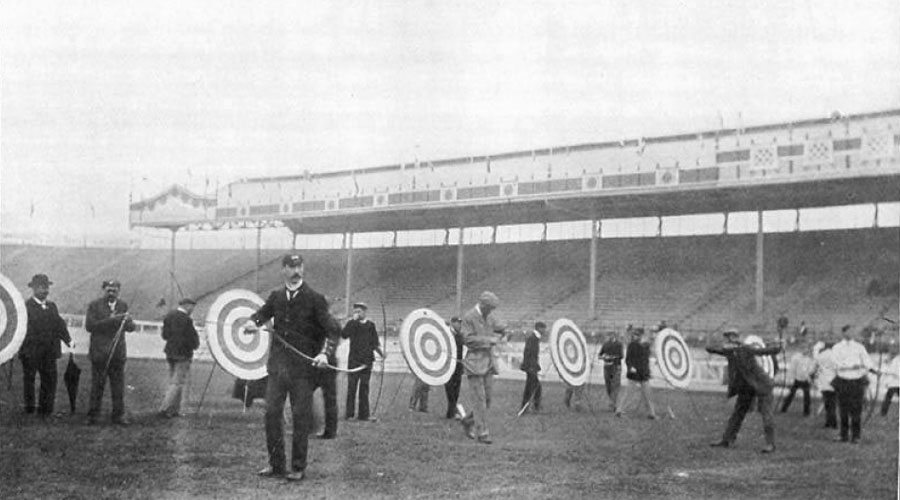
Archery competitions inside White City Stadium during the 1908 games.

Event	Gold	Silver	Bronze
Men's double York round	William Dod; Great Britain	Reginald Brooks-King; Great Britain	Henry B. Richardson; United States
Men's Continental style	Eugène Grisot; France	Louis Vernet; France	Gustave Cabaret; France
Women's double National round	Queenie Newall; Great Britain	Lottie Dod; Great Britain	Beatrice Hill-Lowe; Great Britain

== Participating nations ==
57 archers from 3 nations competed.

- France (15)
- Great Britain (41)
- United States (1)

== Medal table ==
Rank	Nation	Gold	Silver	Bronze	Total
1	Great Britain	2	2	1	5
2	France	1	1	1	3
3	United States	0	0	1	1
Totals (3 entries)		3	3	3	9

== Sources ==
- Official Report of the Games of the IV Olympiad (1908).
- De Wael, Herman. Herman's Full Olympians: "Archery 1908". Accessed 8 April 2006. Available electronically at.
