= List of Olympic venues in rugby union =

For the Summer Olympics, there are four venues that have been used for rugby union.

Games	Venue	Other sports hosted at venue for those games	Capacity	Ref.
1900 Paris	Vélodrome de Vincennes	Cricket, Cycling, Football, Gymnastics	Not listed.	
1908 London	White City Stadium	Archery, Athletics, Cycling (track), Diving, Field hockey, Football, Gymnastics, Lacrosse, Swimming, Tug of war, Water polo (final), Wrestling	97,000	
1920 Antwerp	Olympisch Stadion	Athletics, Equestrian, Field hockey, Football (final), Gymnastics, Modern pentathlon, Tug of war, Weightlifting	12,771	
1924 Paris	Stade de Colombes	Athletics, Cycling (road), Equestrian, Fencing, Football (final), Gymnastics, Modern pentathlon (fencing, running), Tennis	22,737	

== Gallery of venues ==
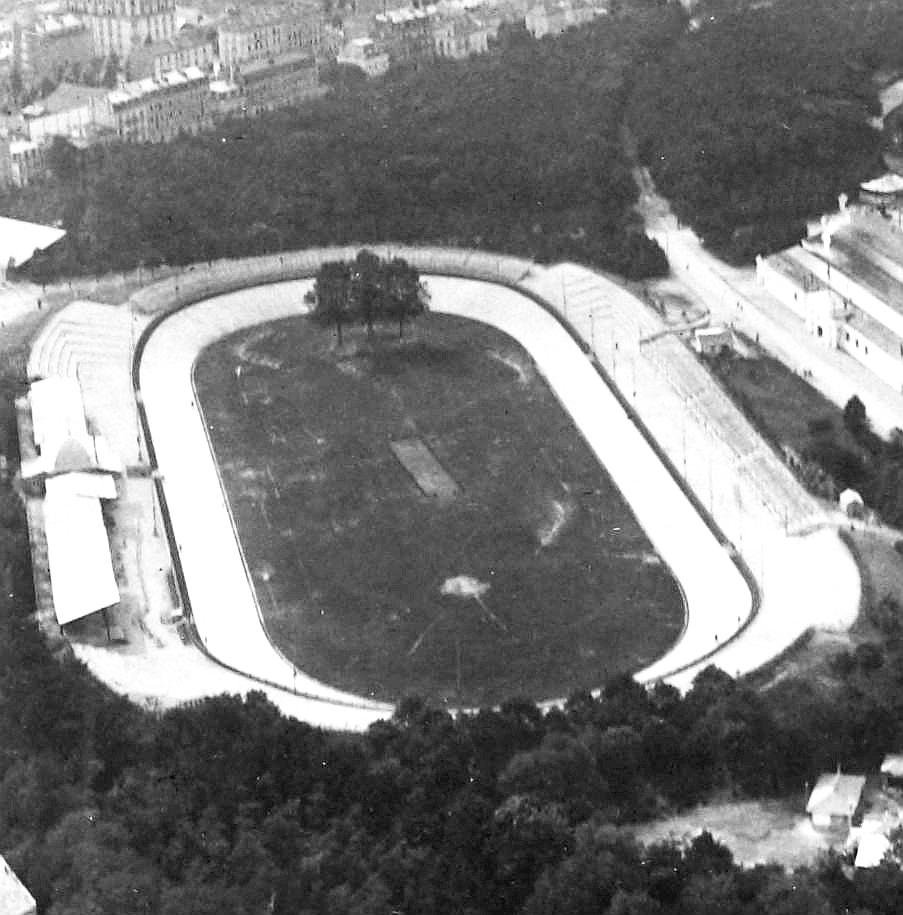
Vélodrome de Vincennes hosted Rugby union at the 1900 Summer Olympics in Paris.

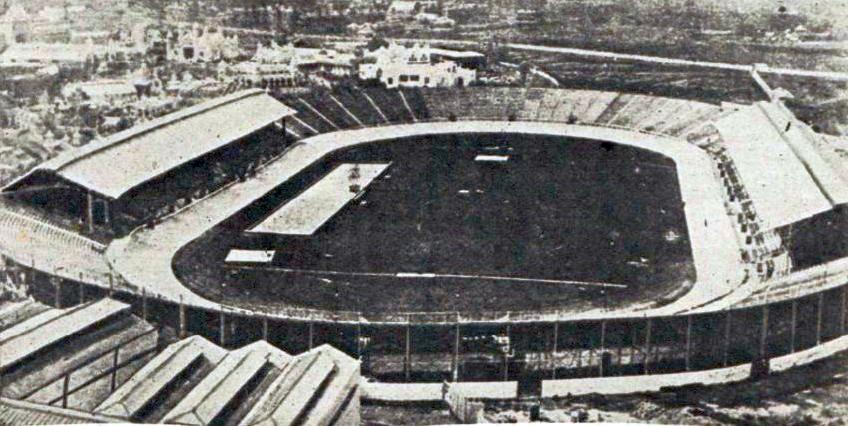
White City Stadium hosted rugby union at the 1908 Summer Olympics in London.

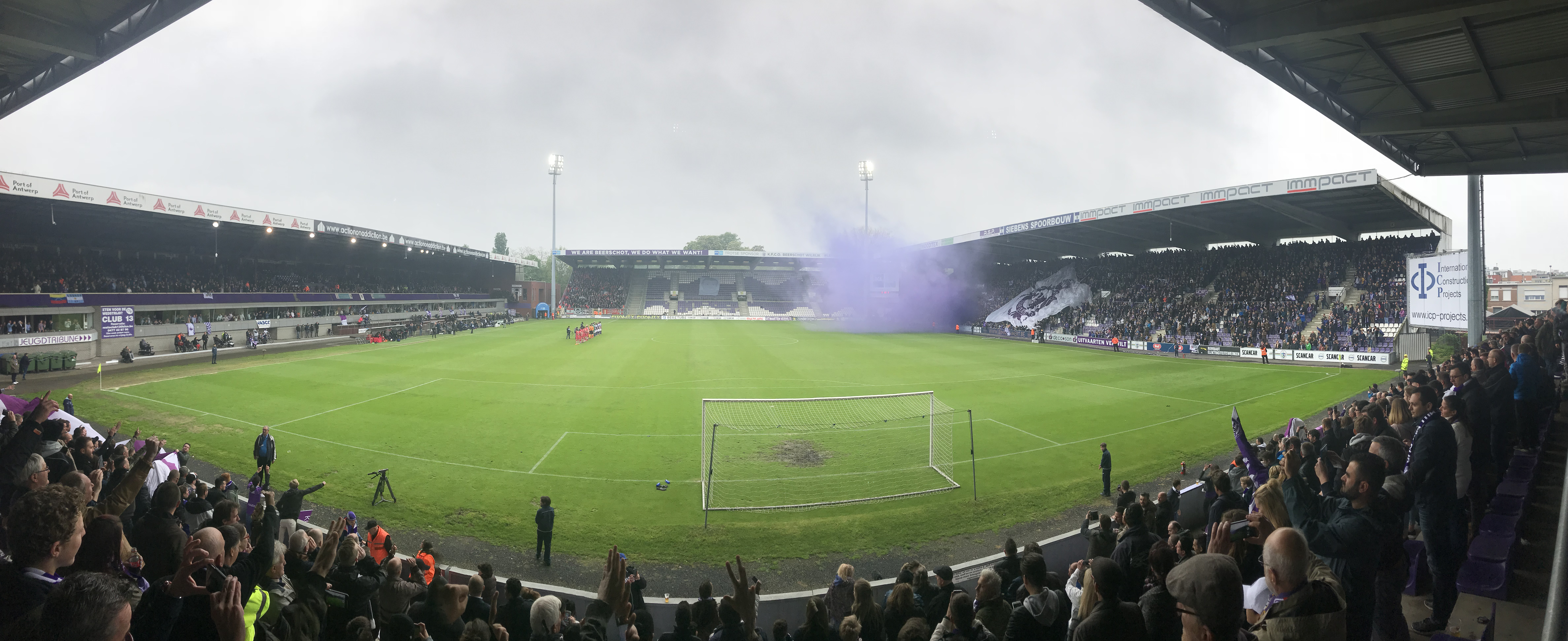
Olympisch Stadion hosted rugby union at the 1920 Summer Olympics in Antwerp.

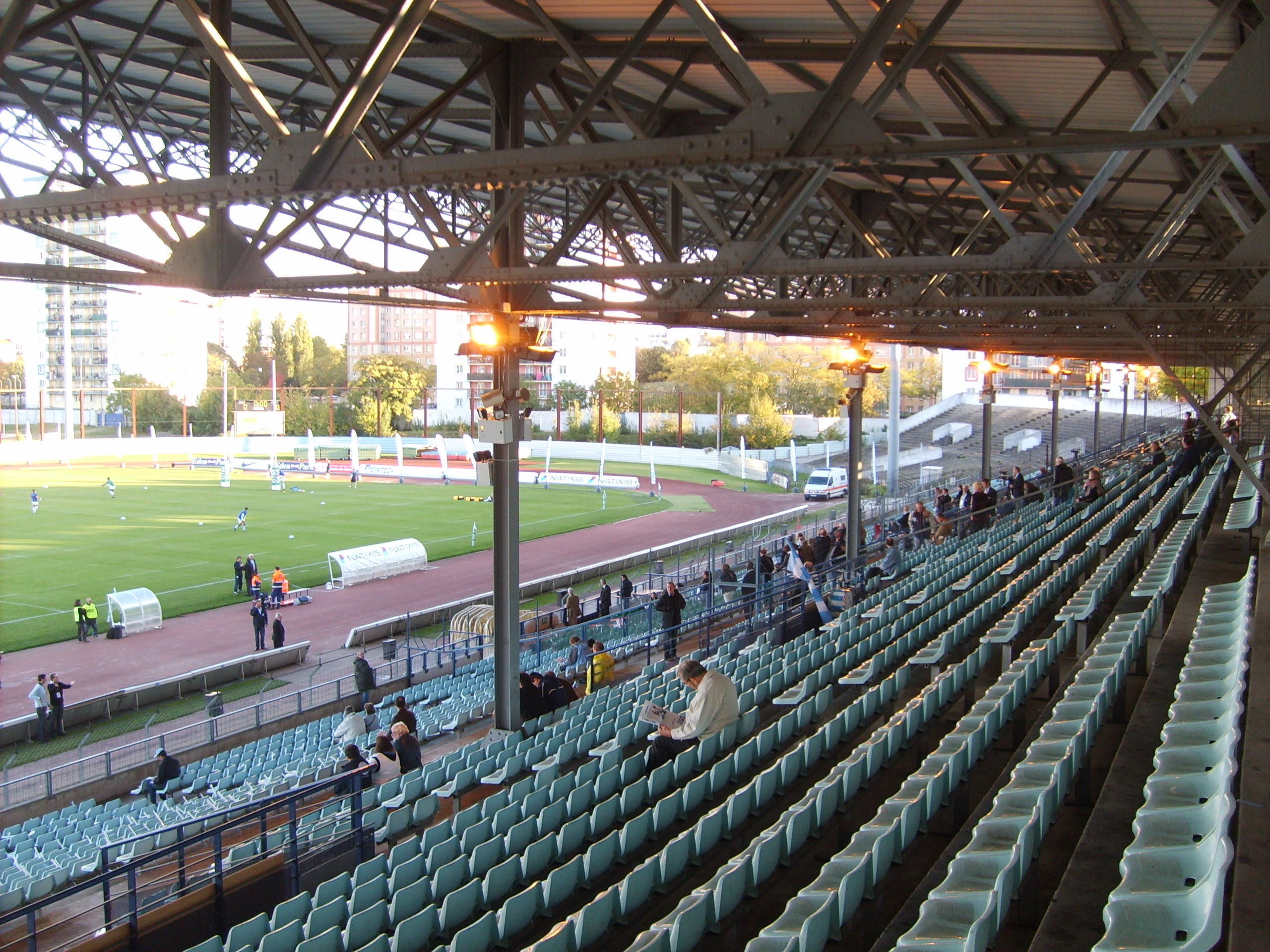
Stade Yves-du-Manoir hosted rugby union at the 1924 Summer Olympics in Paris.

== See also ==
- List of Olympic venues in rugby sevens
