= Robert Heathcote =

Robert Heathcote may refer to:

- Robert Heathcote (archer) (1847–1918), British archer
- Robert Boothby Heathcote (1805–1865), Church of England clergyman
