= ASF Le Perreux =

French football club

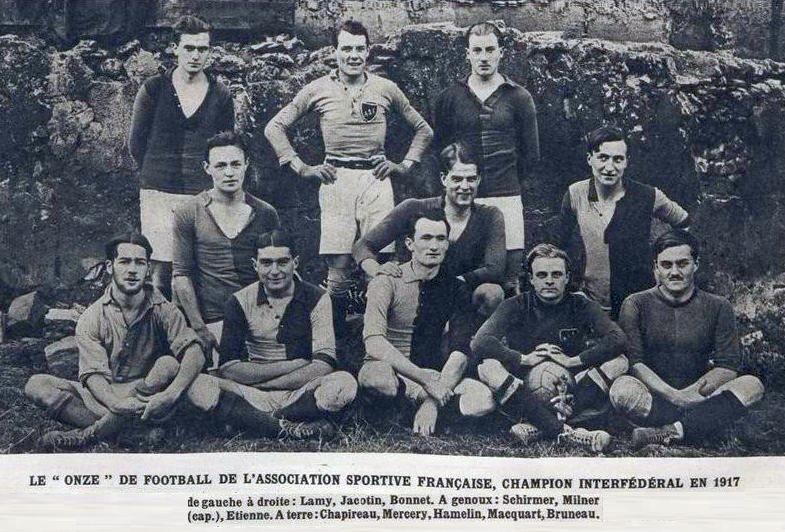
- AS Française team in 1917
- Full name: Association Sportive Francilienne 94 Le Perreux
- Founded: 1896 (Year of foundation)
- Ground: Adolphe-Chéron Stadium, Le Perreux-sur-Marne
- Capacity: 3500
- Website: https://fr-fr.facebook.com/asf.leperreux.3/
Home colours

Association Sportive Francilienne 94 Le Perreux is a French football club located in Le Perreux-sur-Marne, France. The club was formerly known as AS Française from 1896 to 1988.

== History ==
The club was founded in 1896 as Association Sportive Française. Their best ever result was in the amateur era, as they came in second for the 1912 USFSA Football Championship. In 1988, they changed their name to AS Francilienne. They are known as ASF Le Perreux.

In 1908, AS Française won the Coupe Manier, which was awarded to the team composed of at least eight French players with the highest ranking in the USFSA Paris championship.

On 18 April 1909, AS Française played the final of the Coupe Dewar at Stade de Charentonneau, which ended in a 0–5 loss to Gallia Club. On 12 February 1912, AS Française defeated Raincy Sports by the resounding score of 19–0 in Colombes, which set the record for the biggest win in the first series Championships of France. In 1912, the club won the USFSA Paris championship, and this victory qualified the club for the USFSA national championship, reaching the final at Stade Colombes on 28 April, but losing 1–2 to Stade raphaëlois. The club won its second Paris championship in 1914. Some of the members of this team were Oscar Desaulty, Fernand Massip, Jean Zimmermann, Robert Eucher, René Grandjean, René Jacolliot, and René Camard.

During the First World War, AS Française won the 1916–17 LFA Interfederal Cup, beating Stade Rennais 2–1 in the final on 13 May, thanks to goals from Soïka and Handjian. AS Française was one of the 48 clubs that participated in the inaugural Coupe de France in 1917–18, reaching the semifinals, which they lost 1–0 to FC Lyon.

== Colours and badge ==
Their traditional colours are blue and red.

== Honours ==
AS Française

- USFSA Paris Championship:
  - Champions (2): 1911–12 and 1913–14
- USFSA Football Championship:
  - Runner-up (1): 1912
- Coupe Manier:
  - Champions (1): 1908
- Coupe Dewar:
  - Runner-up (1): 1909
- Interfederal Cup:
  - Champions (1): 1916–17
