= John Bridges (archer) =

British archer (1852–1925)

John Henry Bridges (26 March 1852 – 12 February 1925) was a British archer who competed at the 1908 Summer Olympics in London. He also played first-class cricket in two matches for Surrey in 1876.

The Olympics listing indicates that he was born in Beddington, then in Surrey; the cricket website suggests Horsham in Sussex. Both agree that he died in Eastbourne, Sussex.

However, the Epsom & Ewell History Explorer website explains the confusion. He was the son of the Reverend A.H. Bridges, the Rector of Beddington, but was definitely born in Horsham and baptized there on 25 April 1852.

Bridges entered the double York round event in 1908, taking fifth place with 687 points. He also participated in the Continental style event but his result is unknown.

Bridges was educated at Winchester College and at the University of Oxford. He was picked for several cricket trial matches at Oxford but did not appear in any of the university first-class games. He then played in two matches for Surrey against Cambridge University in 1876; the first was rain-ruined, and in the second as a middle-order batsman, he scored 8 and 1.

== See also ==
- Cook, Theodore Andrea (1908). The Fourth Olympiad, Being the Official Report. London: British Olympic Association.
- De Wael, Herman (2001). "Archery 1908". Herman's Full Olympians. Archived from the original on 29 September 2006.
- John Bridges at Team GB
- John Henry Bridges at Olympics.com
