= Perry-Keene =

Perry-Keene is a surname. Notable people with the surname include:

- Allan Perry-Keene (1898–1987), British air marshal, first Commander-in-Chief of the Royal Pakistan Air Force
- Charles Perry-Keene (1846–1926), British archer
