= André Theuriet =

French poet and novelist (1833–1907)

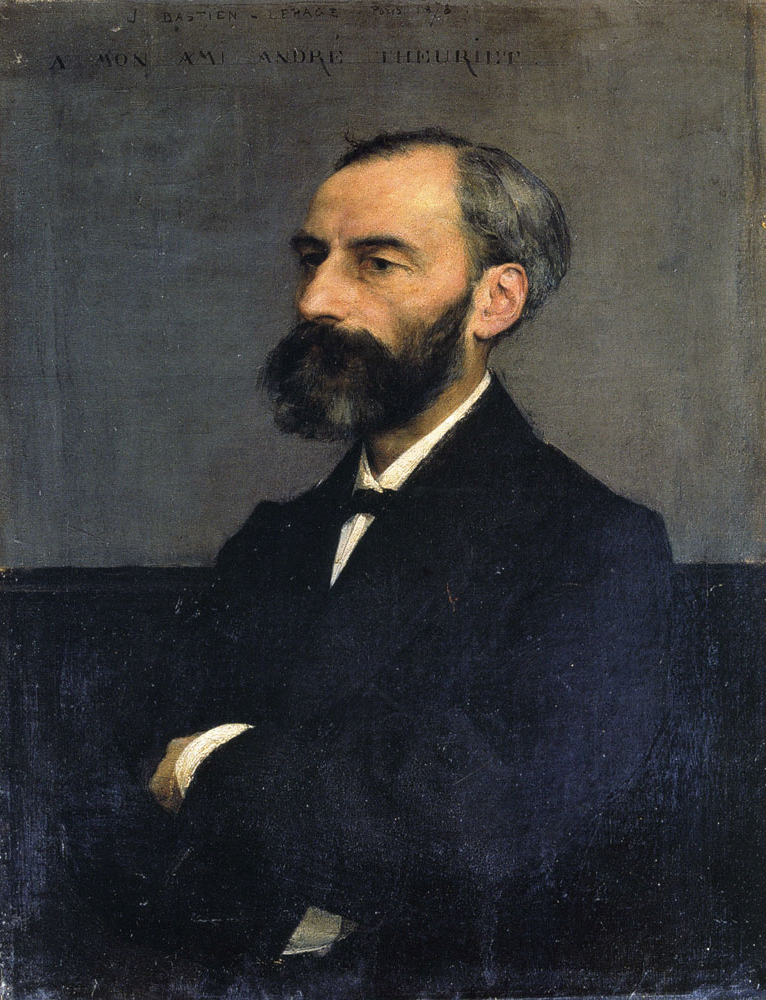
- Portrait by Jules Bastien-Lepage (1878)
- Born: 8 October 1833; Marly-le-Roi, France
- Died: 23 April 1907 (aged 73); Bourg-la-Reine, France
- Education: Bar-le-Duc
- Occupations: Poet; novelist
- Known for: Natural, simple description of rustic and especially of woodland life
- Notable work: see § Bibliography
- Relatives: André Theuriet (grandson)

Claude Adhémar André Theuriet (French: [ɑ̃dʁe tøʁjɛ]; 8 October 1833 – 23 April 1907 ) was a French poet and novelist.

== Life ==
Theuriet was born at Marly-le-Roi (Seine et Oise), to a father from Burgundy and a mother from Lorraine. In 1838, his father was named receveur des domaines at Bar-le-Duc, and the whole family moved to Lorraine. His childhood was for the most part happy. André spent much of his time with his grandmother, who taught him to read. One of his great pleasures as a child was to go visit an eccentric great-aunt, who encouraged his gift for poetry. He would later take a special pleasure in evoking her garden in writing.

As a schoolboy, he was passionate for Hugo, Vigny, Musset and Lamartine. In 1858, striving to win the Académie française's prize in poetry, which that year was on the subject of the Acropolis, he plunged into the Greek classics, above all enjoying the Bucolics of Theocritus; this completed his poetic formation, although he did not win the prize, which was not awarded that year due to the insufficient quality of submissions.

Theuriet studied law in Paris and joined the public service, attaining the rank of chef de bureau, before his retirement during 1886. He would spend his Sundays off hiking through the countryside, taking inspiration from natural scenery. His breakout poem, published in the Revue des Deux Mondes, was In Memoriam. His first collection was the Chemin des bois, many of whose poems had been published already in the Revue des Deux Mondes in 1867; Le bleu et le noir, poèmes de la vie réelle (1874), Nos oiseaux (1886), and other volumes followed.

Theuriet gives natural, simple description of rustic and especially of woodland life, and Théophile Gautier compared him to Shakespeare's Jaques of the forest of Arden. The best of his novels are those that deal with provincial and country life. Composer Jeanne Rivet used his text for her song “Ballade Bretonne.” A contemporary assessment of his writing describes him as a delicate writer of tranquility, a "happy disciple of the masters."

Theuriet received the prix Vitet from the Académie Française in 1890, of which he became a member during 1896. He died on 23 April 1907, and was succeeded at the academy by Jean Richepin. As a local politician, he served as mayor of Bourg-la-Reine. He was made a Chevalier de la Légion d'honneur during 1879, and was made an Officier de la Légion d'honneur during 1895.

In 1880, he married Hélène Narat, widow of the painter Gabriel Lefebvre, an artist renowned under the Second Empire. She died on 2 September 1901.

Theuriet edited the earliest version of Marie Bashkirtseff's diary.

His grandson André Theuriet became a versatile sportsman mostly known as an international rugby union player and swimmer.

== Bibliography ==
- Jean-Marie (1871), one-act play
- Le mariage de Gérard (1875)
- Raymonde (1877)
- Le fils Maugars (1879)
- La maison des Deux Barbeaux (1879)
- Sauvageonne (1880)
- Reine des bois (1890)
- Villa tranquille (1899)
- Le manuscrit du chanoine (1902)
