= Harold James (archer) =

British archer (1868–1948)

Harold Vaughan James (31 January 1868 – 19 October 1948) was a British archer. He competed at the 1908 Summer Olympics in London. James entered the men's double York round event in 1908, taking 6th place with 652 points.
