= Joseph Stopford =

British archer (1866–1951)

Joseph Thomas Sarsfield Stopford (26 August 1866 – 25 November 1951) was a British archer. He competed at the 1908 Summer Olympics in London. Stopford entered the men's double York round event in 1908, taking 12th place with 530 points.
