= Charles Coates (sportsman) =

British sportsman (1857–1922)

- Born: Charles Hutton Coates; 4 May 1857 Lambeth, England
- Died: 14 February 1922 (aged 64) Boscombe, England

Rugby union career
- Position: Forwards
Amateur team(s)
Years	Team	Apps	(Points)
- Cambridge University
–	Leeds		
–	Yorkshire Wanderers		
International career
Years	Team	Apps	(Points)
1880–1882	England	3	(0)

The Reverend Charles Hutton Coates (4 May 1857 – 15 February 1922) was a clergyman who also played international rugby union for England. An all round sportsman, he competed, in archery, at the 1908 Summer Olympics in London for Great Britain.

== Sporting career ==
Coates made his England international début in rugby union against Scotland on 28 February 1880. He would go on to earn three caps, with his final match, also against Scotland, on 4 March 1882.

At the Olympics, Coates entered the men's double York round event in 1908, taking 18th place with 418 points.
