= Jean Zimmermann =

French footballer

Personal information
- Date of birth: 1885
- Place of birth: France
- Date of death: 1960 (aged 74-75)
- Position: Midfielder

Senior career*
Years	Team	Apps	(Gls)
1905–1912	AS Française		

International career
1906–1908	France	0	(0)
- * Club domestic league appearances and goals

Jean Zimmermann (1885 – 1960) was a French footballer who played as a midfielder for AS Française in the early 20th century. He was also a member of the French football squad that competed in the football tournament of the 1908 Olympic Games in London, but he did not play in any matches.

== Playing career ==
Very little is known about his life; Zimmermann was playing football for AS Française as soon as October 1905, aged 20. Three years later, on 5 April 1908, he started in the final of the 1908 Coupe Dewar, which ended in a 2–1 loss to CA Paris. Shortly after, he helped his team win its first-ever piece of silverware, the Coupe Manier, which was awarded to the team composed of at least eight French players with the highest ranking in the USFSA Paris championship. He was most likely one of the best players of the team because later that year, the USFSA selected him for the French national team, being a member of the French squad that competed in the football tournament of the 1908 Olympic Games in London, but he failed to feature in a single game as France was knocked out in the semifinals by Denmark following a resounding 17–1 loss. Between 1906 and 1908, he was called-up by France five times, but stayed on the bench in all of those occasions, thus never becoming an international; however, he never protested, showing great sportsmanship.

On 18 April 1909, Zimmermann started in the final of the Coupe Dewar in 1909 at Stade de Charentonneau, which ended in a 5–0 loss to Gallia Club. In 1912, he helped AS Française win the USFSA Paris championship, and this victory qualified the club for the USFSA national championship, helping his side reach the final at Stade Colombes on 28 April, which ended in a 2–1 loss to Stade raphaëlois.

== Later life and death ==
After the First World War, Zimmermann became an employee in an insurance company. He died in 1960, at the age of either 74 or 75.

== Honours ==
AS Française

- USFSA Paris Championship:
  - Champions (1): 1911–12
- USFSA Football Championship:
  - Runner-up (1): 1912
- Coupe Manier:
  - Champions (1): 1908
- Coupe Dewar:
  - Runner-up (2): 1908 and 1909
