= Capel Pownall =

British archer (1868–1933)

Capel George Pett Pownall (28 November 1868 – 8 February 1933) was a British archer. He competed at the 1908 Summer Olympics in London. Pownall entered the men's double York round event in 1908, taking 11th place with 532 points. He was born in Pimlico.
