= René Jacolliot =

French footballer (1892–1968)

Personal information
- Full name: René Xavier Jacolliot
- Date of birth: 14 July 1892
- Place of birth: Montluçon, France
- Date of death: 24 May 1968 (aged 75)
- Place of death: Perpignan, France
- Position: Midfielder

Senior career*
Years	Team	Apps	(Gls)
1908–1910	US Boulogne		
1911–1914	AS Française		
1918–1919	AS Française		

International career
1913	France	1	(0)
- * Club domestic league appearances and goals

René Xavier Jacolliot (14 July 1892 – 24 May 1968) was a French footballer who played as a midfielder for AS Française and the French national team in the early 1910s.

== Early life and education ==
Born in Montluçon on 14 July 1892, Jacolliot learned about the sport of football from the young Englishmen of the Mariette college.

== Career ==
Jacolliot began his football career at US Boulogne, where he played alongside the likes of Maurice Tillette and Paul Mathaux, and joined AS Française in the early 1910s. In 1912, he helped ASF win the USFSA Paris championship, which qualified the club for the USFSA national championship. They reached the final at Stade Colombes on 28 April, which ended in a 2–1 loss to Stade raphaëlois. Earlier that year, Jacolliot was one of the probable players proposed by the USFSA to represent France in the football tournament of the 1912 Olympic Games in Stockholm.

The following year, on 16 February 1913, the 20-year-old Jacolliot earned his first (and only) international cap for France in a friendly match against Belgium at Uccle, which ended in a 3–0 loss. The following day, he was harshly criticized by the journalists of L'Auto (currently known as L'Équipe), who stated that he was worst forward of the match, describing him as "a huge hole, missing all the opportunities Bigué gave him, never holding on to his ball".

The following year, on 22 February 1914, Jacolliot helped AS Française claim its second USFSA Paris championship.

== Later life ==
In 1913, Jacolliot carried out his mandatory military service in Versailles, where he joined the 1st Army Corps. He was a sergeant in the 5th Engineer Regiment in Versailles when the First World War broke out in 1914.

After a few years in the east of France, he returned to Paris in 1924, where he took charge of training young people at the ASF. Later, he became a manufacturer of steel cutlery in Asnières.

He remains a loyal follower of the French team, notably attending matches at the Parc des Princes.

== Death ==
Jacolliot died in Perpignan on 24 May 1968, at the age of 75.

== Honours ==
AS Française

- USFSA Paris Championship:
  - Champions (2): 1911–12 and 1913–14
- USFSA Football Championship:
  - Runner-up (1): 1912

== Bibliography ==
- Perry, Raphaël (2021). Bleus éphémères [Ephemeral blues] (in French). Paris: Hugo Sport. p. 42. ISBN 978-2-7556-9244-0.
