= Hugh Nesham =

British archer (1878–1923)

Hugh Percy Nesham (January 17, 1878 in Kingston upon Thames - June 26, 1923) was a British archer. He competed at the 1908 Summer Olympics in London. Nesham entered the men's double York round event in 1908, taking 8th place with 643 points.
