= Henri Berton =

French archer

Henri Berton was a French archer. He competed at the 1908 Summer Olympics in London. Berton entered the men's double York round event in 1908, taking 16th place (the best finish of a French archer in the event) with 425 points. He then competed in the Continental style contest, placing 8th at 212 points.
