= Lockhart Leith =

British fencer (1876–1940)

Personal information
- Born: 2 June 1876 Paddington, London, England
- Died: 30 November 1940 (aged 64) Reading, Berkshire, England

Sport
- Sport: Fencing

Captain Lockhart Leith CMG DSO RN (2 June 1876 – 30 November 1940) was a British fencer and Royal Navy officer. He competed in the individual sabre event at the 1908 Summer Olympics.

Leith was the son of Walter Leith JP of Ashby-de-la-Zouch. He was educated at Burney's Royal Naval Academy, Gosport and joined HMS Britannia in 1890. He was promoted to lieutenant on 30 September 1898, and among his early postings was a temporary posting to HMS Duke of Wellington in 1902. The following year he took a course of gymnastic training at Aldershot. In 1904 he was appointed in command of the tbd HMS Dasher. He was promoted to commander on 31 December 1910 and to captain on 31 December 1916.

Leith served with distinction during the First World War. He was awarded the Distinguished Service Order in 1917 and appointed a Companion of the Order of St Michael and St George in the 1919 New Year Honours. Additionally, he was awarded the Navy Cross from the United States in 1920 and retired in 1922.

Leith died in 1940 after an operation and was survived by his wife Norah (née Barry).
