= John Keyworth =

British archer (1859–1954)

John Bunyan Keyworth (9 May 1859 – 24 April 1954) was a British archer who competed at the 1908 Summer Olympics in London. He was born in Lincoln, Lincolnshire. Keyworth entered the double York round event in 1908, taking ninth place with 622 points. He also competed in the Continental style event, placing twelfth at 190 points.
