= Léon Lécuyer =

French sports shooter

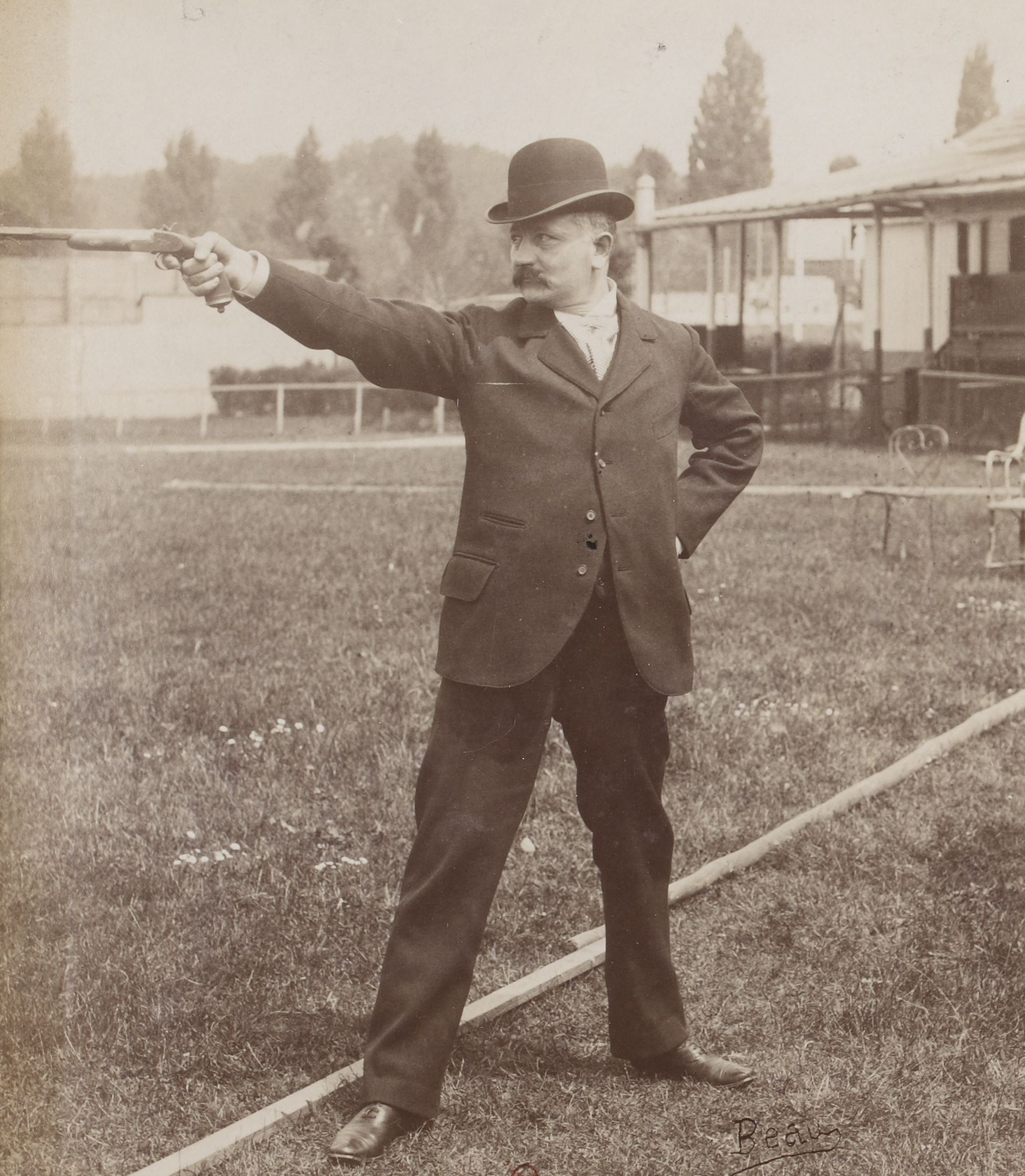
- Léon Lécuyer in 1898

Personal information
- Born: 8 April 1855 Paris, France
- Died: 25 October 1915 (aged 60)

Sport
- Sport: Sports shooting
Medal record
Men's shooting
Representing France
Olympic Games
Bronze medal – third place	1908 London	Team small-bore rifle

Léon Lécuyer (8 April 1855 – 25 October 1915) was a French sports shooter. He competed in fencing at the 1900 Summer Olympics. He also competed in three events at the 1908 Summer Olympics winning a bronze medal in the team small-bore rifle event.
