= Louis-Albert Salingré =

French archer

Louis-Albert Salingré was a French archer who competed at the 1908 Summer Olympics in London. Salingré entered the double York round event in 1908, taking 22nd place with 347 points. He then competed in the Continental style contest, placing seventh at 215 points. He was the first son and eldest child of Eugen d'Albert and Louise Salingré.
