= Oscar Jay =

French archer

Oscar Jay was a French archer. He competed at the 1908 Summer Olympics in London. Jay entered the Men's Continental Style event in 1908, taking 17th (and last) place with 134 points.

== Sources ==
- Cook, Theodore Andrea (1908). The Fourth Olympiad, Being the Official Report. London: British Olympic Association.
- De Wael, Herman (2001). "Archery 1908". Herman's Full Olympians.
