= Charles Vallée =

French archer

Charles Vallée (born 18 November 1861, date of death unknown) was a French archer. He competed at the 1908 Summer Olympics in London. Vallié entered the men's Continental style event in 1908, taking 11th place with 193 points.
