= Reginald Brooks-King =

Welsh archer (1861–1938)

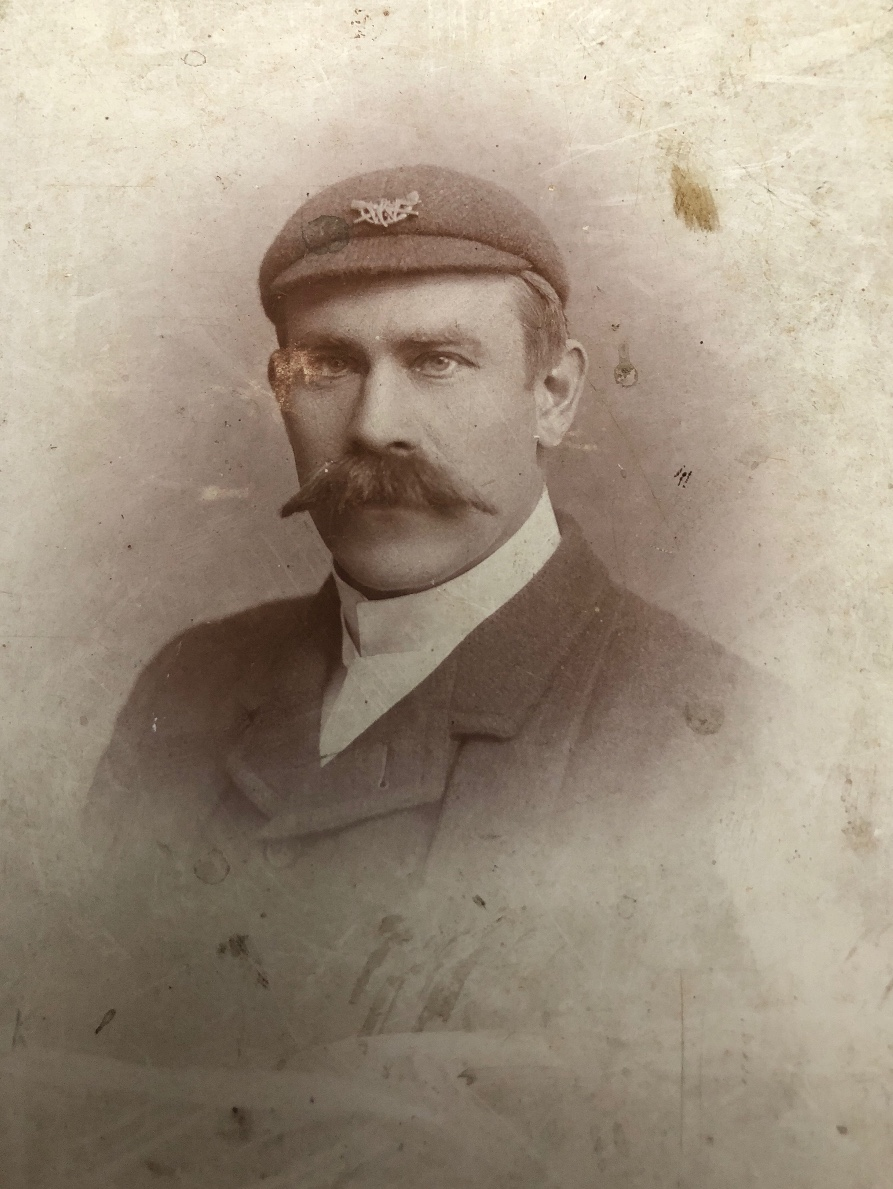

Personal information
- Nationality: Welsh
- Born: 27 August 1861 Monmouth, Wales
- Died: 19 September 1938 (aged 77) Ottery St Mary, England

Sport
- Sport: Archery
- Club: West Somerset Archery Society, Taunton
Medal record
Men's archery
Representing Great Britain
Olympic Games
Silver medal – second place	1908 London	Double York round

Reginald Brooks-King (27 August 1861 – 19 September 1938) was a Welsh archer. He was born in Dixton, Monmouth, Wales, to James Pearce King and Katherine Bagnall. He won the silver medal in the men's double York round at the 1908 Summer Olympics. Brooks-King shot a 393 in the first round of the competition, held in London. This put him in second place, 10 points behind leader William Dod halfway through the event. On the second day of shooting, Brooks-King hit a 375 to take fourth place on the day but second place overall with 768 points, well behind Dod but 8 points ahead of Henry B. Richardson in third.

== Biography ==
Reginald Brooks-King was one of seven children born to James Pearce King and Katherine Bagnall in Dixton, Monmouth. Reginald was a student at King's College, London, studying engineering and applied sciences from 1880 to 1882. From 1886 to 1887, he was the second draughtsman in the drawing office of W.G Bagnall. He married Jessie Bagnall in January 1893 and together they had two children, Morrice Brooks-King and Edith Marian Brooks-King. He played minor counties cricket for Wiltshire in the 1903 Minor Counties Championship, making two appearances. Reginald died in 1938 in Devon, United Kingdom.
