= Robert Heathcote (archer) =

British archer (1847–1918)

Robert Walker Heathcote (7 April 1847 – 8 April 1918) was a British archer. He competed at the 1908 Summer Olympics in London. Heathcote entered the men's double York round event in 1908, taking 14th place with 476 points.
