= Charles Keene (archer) =

British archer (1846–1926)

Personal information
- Birth name: Charles John Perry Keene
- National team: Great Britain
- Born: 11 April 1846; Minety, England
- Died: 29 November 1926 (aged 80); Dean Prior, England
- Occupation: Archer

Charles John Perry Keene (11 April 1846 – 29 November 1926) was a British archer who competed at the 1908 Summer Olympics in London. Keene entered the double York round event in 1908, taking tenth place with 543 points. His archery affiliations included the Devon and Cornwall Archery Society of Great Britain.
