= Gustave Cabaret =

French archer (1866–1918)

Olympic medal record

Men's Archery
Bronze medal – third place	1908 London	Continental style

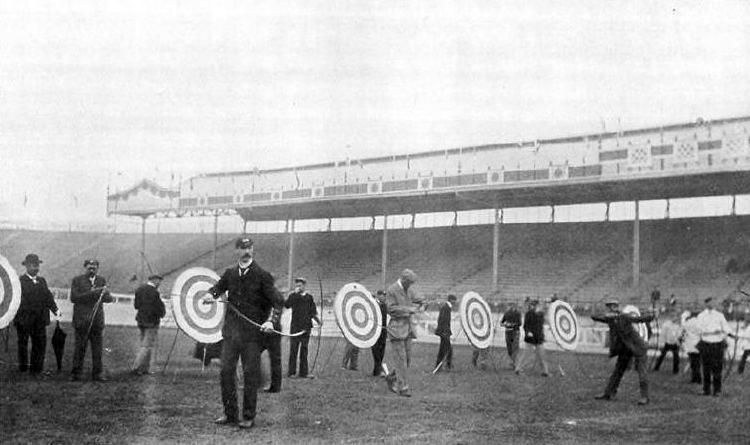

Gustave Cabaret (1 November 1866 – 4 April 1918) was a French archer. He competed at the 1908 Summer Olympics in London. Cabaret entered the men's double York round event in 1908, taking 26th place with 191 points. That last-place finish was not repeated in the second event of the men's archery competitions in 1908. Cabaret won the bronze medal in the Continental style, scoring 255 points to finish 8 behind Eugène Grisot and only 1 behind Louis Vernet.

== Sources ==
- Cook, Theodore Andrea (1908). The Fourth Olympiad, Being the Official Report. London: British Olympic Association.
- De Wael, Herman (2001). "Archery 1908". Herman's Full Olympians.
