= Jean Louis de la Croix =

French archer

Jean Louis S. de la Croix was a French archer. He competed at the 1908 Summer Olympics in London. De la Croix entered the men's Continental style event in 1908, taking 14th place with 177 points.
