= John Penrose (archer) =

British archer (1850–1932)

John Penrose (5 May 1850 – 21 April 1932) was a British archer who competed at the 1908 Summer Olympics in London. Penrose entered the double York round event in 1908, taking fourth place with 709 points.
