= André Theuriet (athlete) =

French sportsman

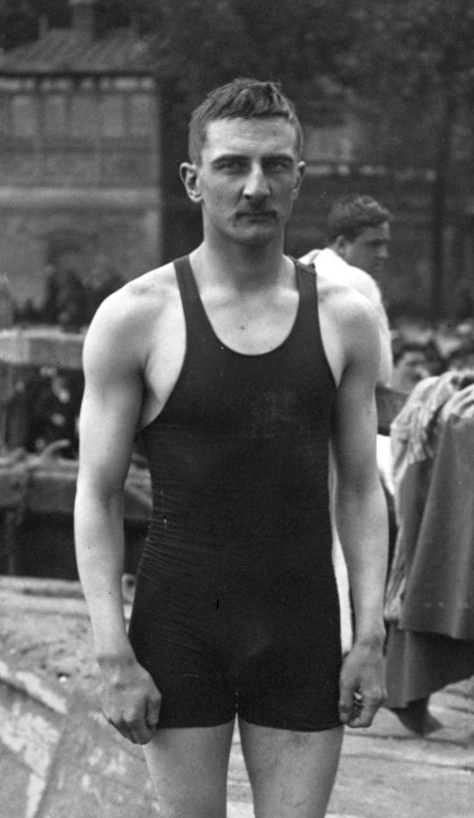
- André Theuriet in 1910

Personal information
- Born: 29 March 1887 Lyon, France
- Died: 21 March 1965 (aged 77) Paris, France
- Height: 5 ft 6 in (1.68 m)
- Weight: 148 lb (67 kg)

Sport
- Sport: Swimming, rugby, football, water polo
- Club: SCUF, Paris

André Armand Godefroy Theuriet (29 March 1887 – 21 March 1965) was a French athlete and grandson of the novelist André Theuriet. He competed nationally in a wide range of sports, and internationally in swimming and rugby. In swimming he failed to reach the final of the 1500 m freestyle event at the 1908 Summer Olympics. In rugby he played five international matches as a scrum-half between 1909 and 1913.

Nationally, Theuriet competed in motorcycling, shooting, walking, boxing, football, cycling, running, field hockey, and water polo. He won the national university titles in running, 5000 m and cross country. In football, he was the captain of his club SCUF in 1921, and in water polo, his team won the Paris Cup in 1909. Theuriet was one of the best French rugby scrum-halves of the early 1910s. From 1912, he was the team captain of SCUF.

Theuriet retired from competitions in 1914 and fought in World War I as a sergeant with the French 103rd infantry unit. He returned to rugby in the early 1920, but mostly as a coach and functionary rather than player.
