= Alfred Poupart =

French archer (1876–1963)

Alfred Poupart (5 June 1876- February 1963) was a French archer. He competed at the 1908 Summer Olympics in London. Poupart entered the men's double York round event in 1908. He was the only archer of the 27-man field to not finish, withdrawing partway through the first round with only 36 points. He then competed in the Continental style contest, placing 16th at 155 points.
