= Robert Eucher =

French footballer (1884–1940)

Personal information
- Full name: Robert Antoine Eucher
- Date of birth: 14 June 1884
- Place of birth: 13th arrondissement of Paris, France
- Date of death: 23 May 1940 (aged 55)
- Place of death: 13th arrondissement of Paris, France
- Position: Forward

Senior career*
Years	Team	Apps	(Gls)
1904–1911	AS Française		

International career
1905	Paris	1	(0)
1908	France	1	(0)
1908	France B	0	(0)
1909–1910	France (unofficial)	2	(0)
- * Club domestic league appearances and goals

Robert Antoine Eucher (14 June 1884 – 23 May 1940) was a French footballer who played as a forward for AS Française and in one match for the France national team in May 1908, and who was then selected as a member of the French B squad that competed in the football tournament at the 1908 Summer Olympics in October, but he did not play in any matches.

== Playing career ==
Eucher was born on 14 June 1884 in the 13th arrondissement of Paris, where he began his football career at AS Française in 1904, aged 20. On 2 April 1905, Eucher played for Paris in the very first Paris-Nord match, helping his side to a 4–1 win.

On 5 April 1908, Eucher started in the final of the 1908 Coupe Dewar, which ended in a 2–1 loss to CA Paris. In the following month, on 10 May, the 23-year-old Eucher earned his first and only cap for the French national team in a friendly match against the Netherlands, replacing Émile Sartorius, who had been retained in the North for his duties as an elector; France lost 4–1. A few months later, in October, the Union des Sociétés Françaises de Sports Athlétiques (USFSA) selected Eucher for the French B squad that competed in the football tournament at the 1908 Summer Olympics, but he failed to feature in a single game as they were knocked out in the quarter-finals by Denmark.

Eucher helped AS Française win the 1908 Coupe Manier, which was awarded to the team composed of at least eight French players with the highest ranking in the USFSA Paris championship. On 18 April 1909, he started in the final of the Coupe Dewar in 1909 at Stade de Charentonneau, which ended in a 0–5 loss to Gallia Club. In 1909 and 1910, Eucher played for France in two unofficial matches against England AFA, the first on 18 March 1909 in Colombes (0–8), and then on 12 March 1910 in Ipswich, the latter ending in a resounding 0–20 loss. On 5 March 1911, Eucher played an international match against English club Weybridge, helping his side to a 4–1 win.

== Later life and death ==
During the First World War, Eucher fought for the 101st Infantry Regiment, and after the War, he became a cashier at the Havas Agency in Paris.

Eucher died in the 13th arrondissement of Paris on 23 May 1940, at the age of 55.

== Honours ==
AS Française

- Coupe Manier:
  - Champions (1): 1908
- Coupe Dewar:
  - Runner-up (1): 1909
