= Charles Quervel =

French archer

Charles Quervel was a French archer. He competed at the 1908 Summer Olympics in London. Quervel entered the men's double York round event in 1908, taking 24th place with 241 points. He then competed in the Continental style contest, placing 5th at 223 points.
