= Charles Aubras =

French archer

Charles Aubras was a French archer. He competed at the 1908 Summer Olympics in London. Aubras entered the men's Continental style event in 1908, taking 4th place with 231 points. He was 24 points behind the bronze medalist and 32 behind the champion.
