= Archery at the 1908 Summer Olympics – Men's Continental style =

Archery at the Olympics

Men's Continental style at the Games of the IV Olympiad
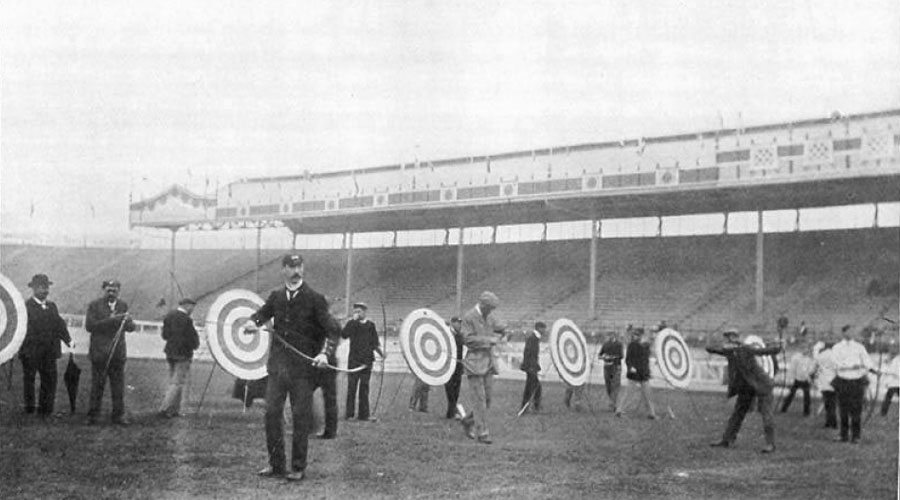
- Archery competitions inside White City Stadium during the 1908 games.
- Venue: White City Stadium
- Date: 20 July
- Competitors: 17 from 3 nations

Medalists
1st place, gold medalist(s)		Eugène Grisot	France
2nd place, silver medalist(s)		Louis Vernet	France
3rd place, bronze medalist(s)		Gustave Cabaret	France

The men's Continental style was one of three archery events on the Archery at the 1908 Summer Olympics programme. The event was held on 20 July. NOCs were limited to 30 competitors each, though none came close to this maximum.

Just as the British dominated the York round archery, the French dominated the Continental-style. The one Briton to formally enter placed 12th, while the American placed 15th. However, "several" of the British archers who had competed in the double York round event also joined in the shooting for this event without competing for medals. One, Robert Backhouse, shot a score of 260. He received a Diploma of Merit for the accomplishment, which would have earned a silver medal had he been shooting in competition.

Louis Vernet and Henri Berton each hit the target with all 40 arrows. Eugène Grisot, Gustave Cabaret, Charles Aubras, and Louis Salingre each missed only once.

== Competition format ==
Each archer shot 40 arrows, with the target 50 metres distant. Arrows were shot singly. Each hit was worth 9, 7, 5, 3, or 1 points depending on which ring was hit; an arrow touching two rings would count as hitting the higher value. Ties were broken first by number of hits, then by number of golds (hits in the 9-point ring).

== Results ==
Place	Name	Nation	Score
1st place, gold medalist(s)	Eugène Grisot	France	263
2nd place, silver medalist(s)	Louis Vernet	France	256
3rd place, bronze medalist(s)	Gustave Cabaret	France	255
4	Charles Aubras	France	231
5	Charles Quervel	France	223
6	Albert Dauchez	France	222
7	Louis Salingre	France	215
8	Henri Berton	France	212
9	Eugène Richez	France	210
10	Edouard Beaudoin	France	206
11	Charles Vallée	France	193
12	John Keyworth	Great Britain	190
13	Émile Fisseux	France	185
14	Jean Louis de la Croix	France	177
15	Henry B. Richardson	United States	171
16	Alfred Poupart	France	155
17	Oscar Jay	France	134

== Sources ==
- Official Report of the Games of the IV Olympiad (1908).
- De Wael, Herman. Herman's Full Olympians: "Archery 1908". Accessed 8 April 2006. Available electronically at.
