= William Dod =

British archer (1867–1954)

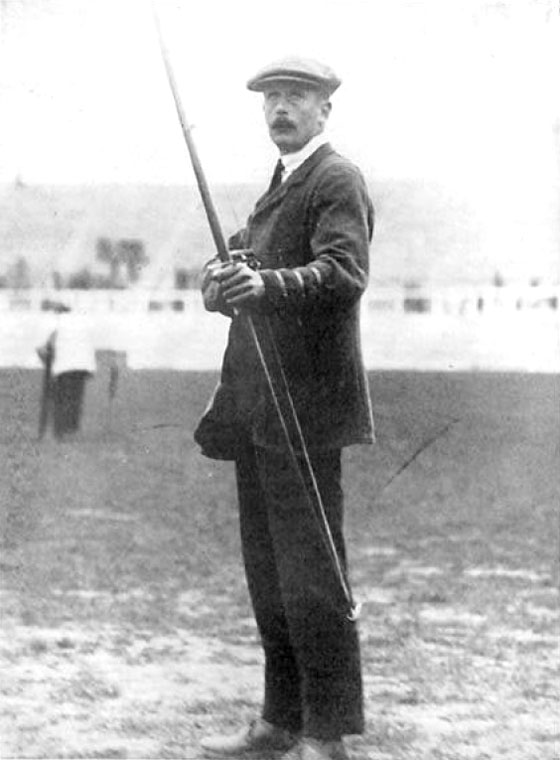
- William Dod

Medal record

Men's Archery

Representing Great Britain

Olympic Games
Gold medal – first place	1908 London	Double York round

William Dod (18 July 1867 – 8 October 1954) was a British archer. He won the gold medal in the men's double York round at the 1908 Summer Olympics on his 41st birthday.

William Dod was born in Bebington, Cheshire, a descendant of Sir Anthony Dod of Edge, who was knighted at the Battle of Agincourt by King Henry V. It has been claimed that Sir Anthony was in command of the English archers, although this must be an exaggeration as Sir Thomas Erpingham is universally credited with having overall command.

William was educated at home by private tutors and his family fortune, gathered from the cotton trade, meant that he never had to work for a living. He indulged his passion for the sporting life as both a scratch golfer and a big game hunter. He took up archery at the home of the Legh family, who had an estate close to the Dods in Cheshire and were one of the greatest names in the sport.

Neither Dod nor his sister Lottie took part in competitive archery until they moved from Cheshire south to Berkshire in 1906, where they joined the newly formed Welford Park archery club. Within two and a half years, Dod became Olympic Champion. William Dod mastered the torrential rain on the first day of the Olympic competition to hold a 10-point advantage. When the rain gave way to swirling wind conditions on the second day, Dod forged ahead and comfortably took gold with a margin of 47 points over Reginald Brooks-King.

He went on to win the Grand National Archery title, effectively the British national title, in 1909 and 1911. Dod retired from competition after the 1911 championship and rekindled his love of golf. In 1912 he reached the 4th round of the British Amateur Championship.

After the outbreak of World War I, Dod enlisted in the Royal Fusiliers and served as a private in the trenches for a brief time before successfully applying for a transfer to the Royal Navy. He was commissioned in the Royal Naval Volunteer Reserve in 1915 and spent a year as an administrative officer in France with the Royal Navy Air Service before being invalided back home to England.

William and Lottie Dod settled at Westward Ho! in Devon after World War II and settled into a life of golf in retirement. In his eighties, he moved back to London and died in Earl's Court in 1954.
