= Frédéric Chapuis =

French fencer

Personal information
- Born: 17 November 1874 Tencin, France
- Died: 25 September 1915 (aged 40) Vergigny, France

Sport
- Sport: Fencing

Frédéric Chapuis (17 November 1874 – 25 September 1915) was a French fencer. He competed in the individual sabre event at the 1908 Summer Olympics.
