= Georges Lateux =

French fencer

Personal information
- Born: 1 September 1868
- Died: Unknown

Sport
- Sport: Fencing

Georges Lateux (born 1 September 1868, date of death unknown) was a French fencer. He competed in the individual sabre event at the 1908 Summer Olympics.
