= Georges Langevin =

French fencer

Personal information
- Born: 1 October 1888
- Died: 22 August 1967 (aged 78)

Sport
- Sport: Fencing

Georges Langevin (1 October 1888 – 22 August 1967) was a French fencer. He competed in the individual sabre event at the 1908 Summer Olympics.
