= List of Olympic venues in rugby sevens =

There are five venues that have been or are planned to be used for rugby sevens in the Summer Olympics:

Games	Venue	Other sports hosted at this venue at these games	Capacity	Ref.
2016 Rio de Janeiro	Deodoro Stadium	Modern pentathlon (riding, combined run & shoot)	15,000	
2020 Tokyo	Tokyo Stadium	Football, Modern pentathlon (swimming, riding, combined run & shoot)	48,000	
2024 Paris	Stade de France	Ceremonies (closing), Athletics	77,083	
2028 Los Angeles	South Bay Stadium	Modern pentathlon (all except fencing)	27,000	
2032 Brisbane	Lang Park	Football (finals)	52,500	

== Gallery of venues ==
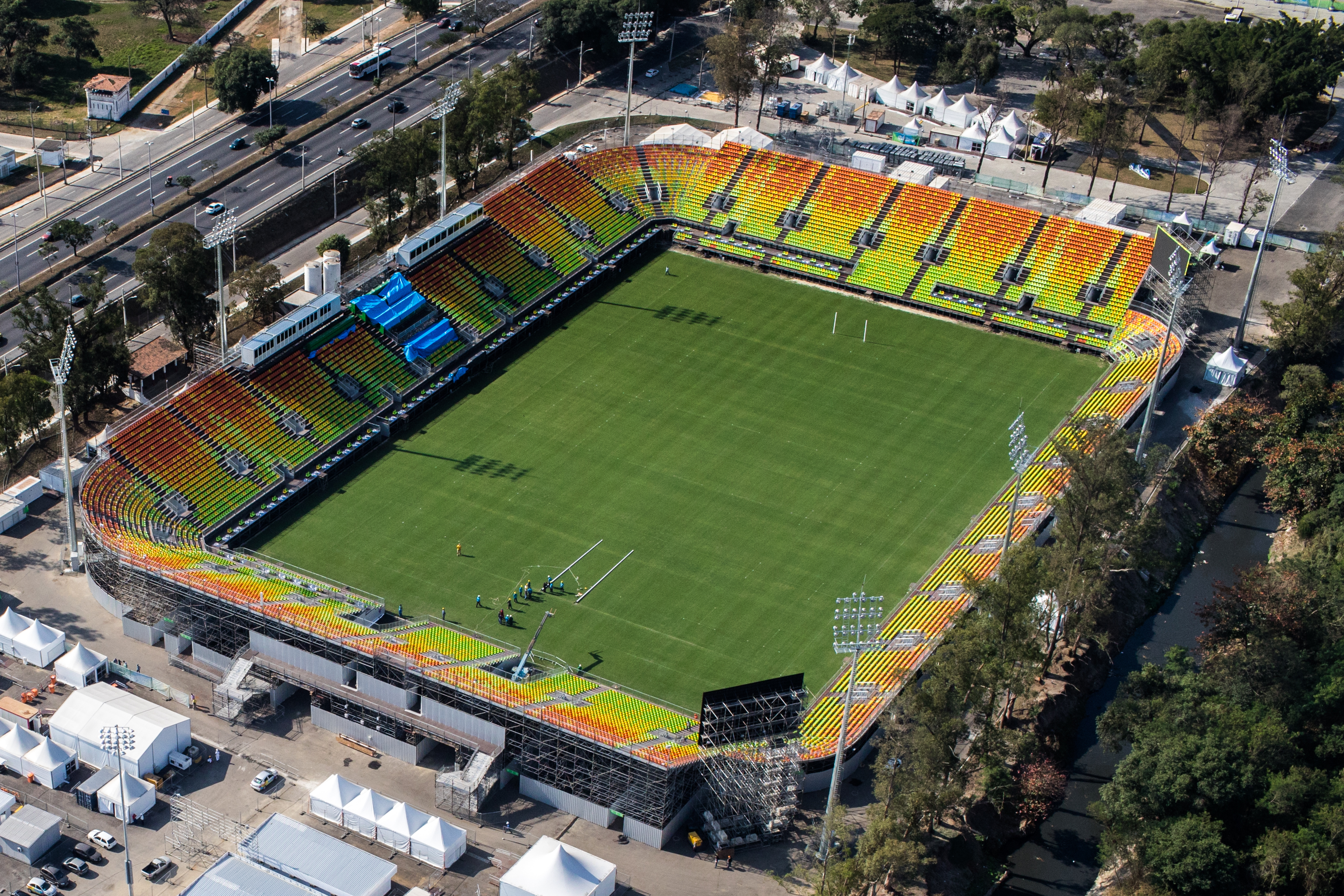
Deodoro Stadium hosted rugby sevens at the 2016 Summer Olympics in Rio de Janeiro.

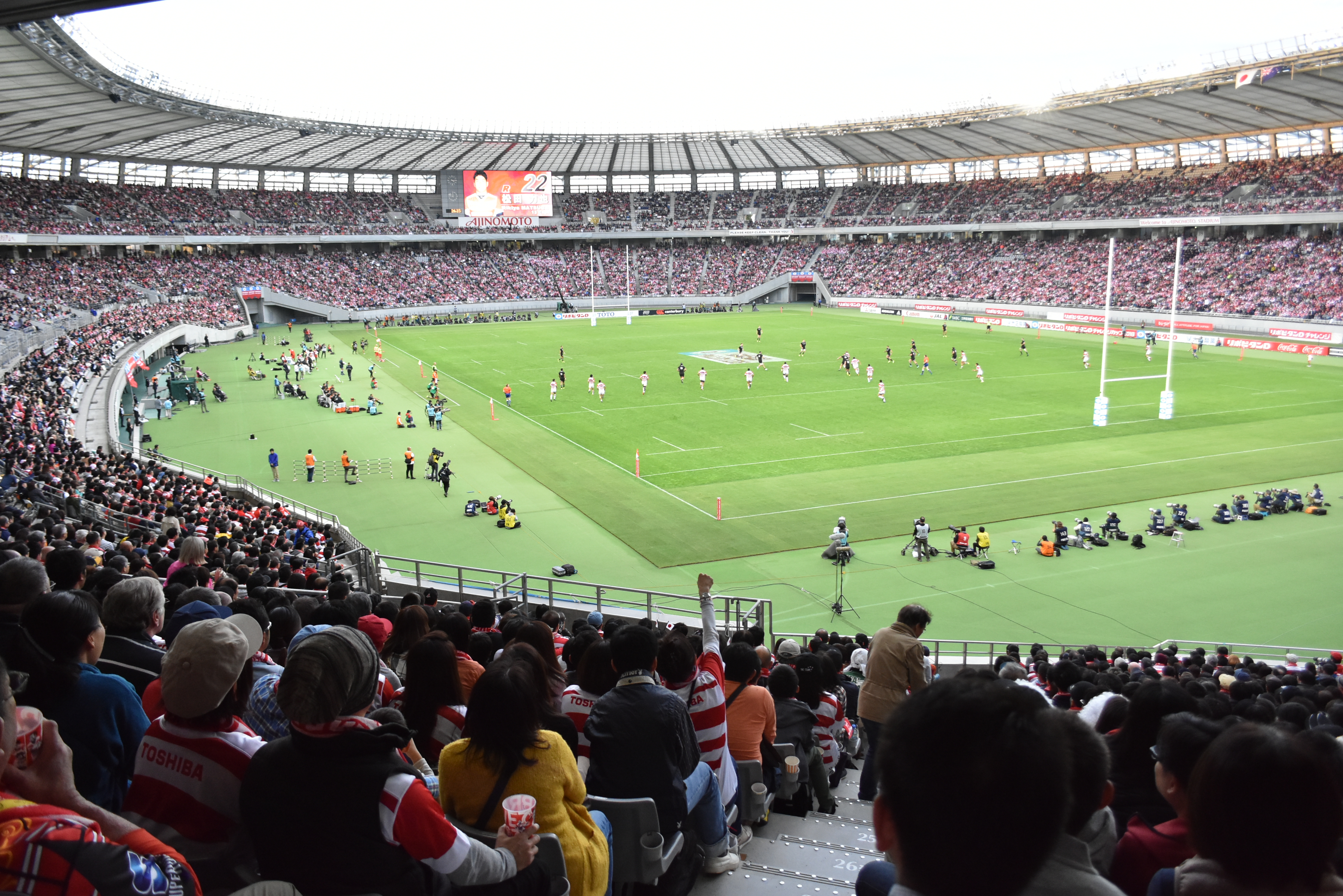
Ajinomoto Stadium hosted Rugby sevens at the 2020 Summer Olympics in Tokyo.

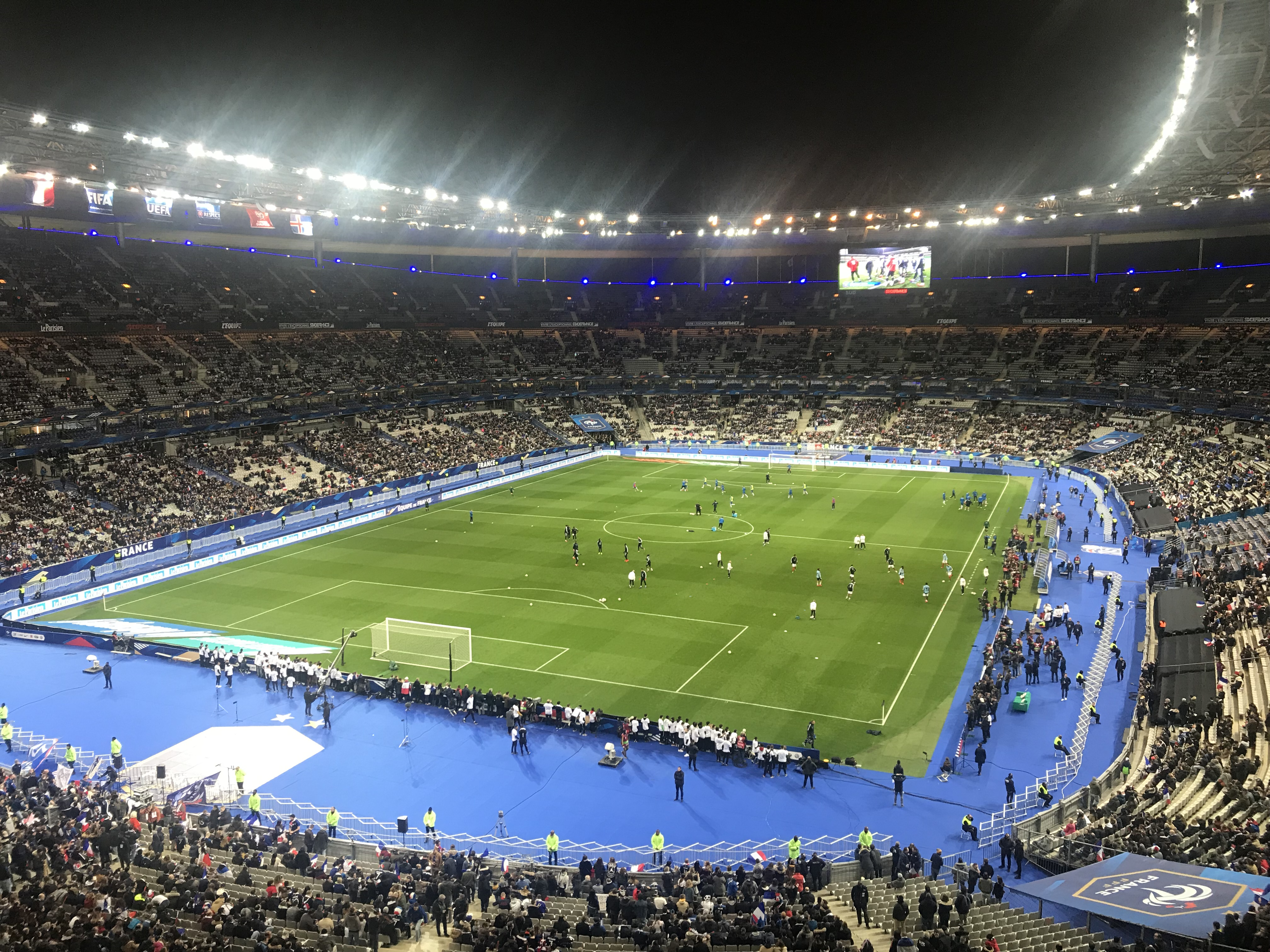
Stade de France hosted Rugby sevens at the 2024 Summer Olympics in Paris.

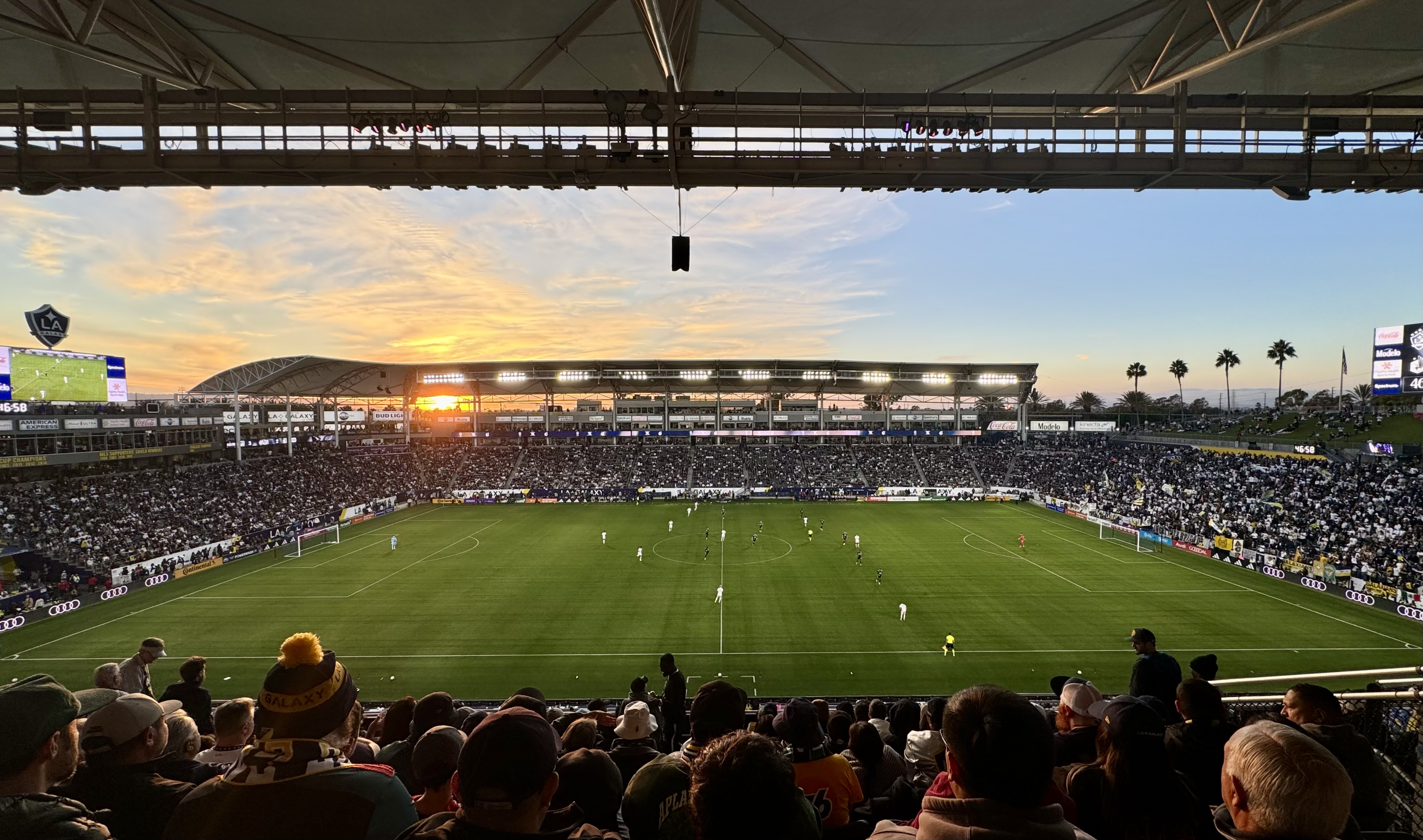
Dignity Health Sports Park will host Rugby sevens at the 2028 Summer Olympics in Los Angeles.

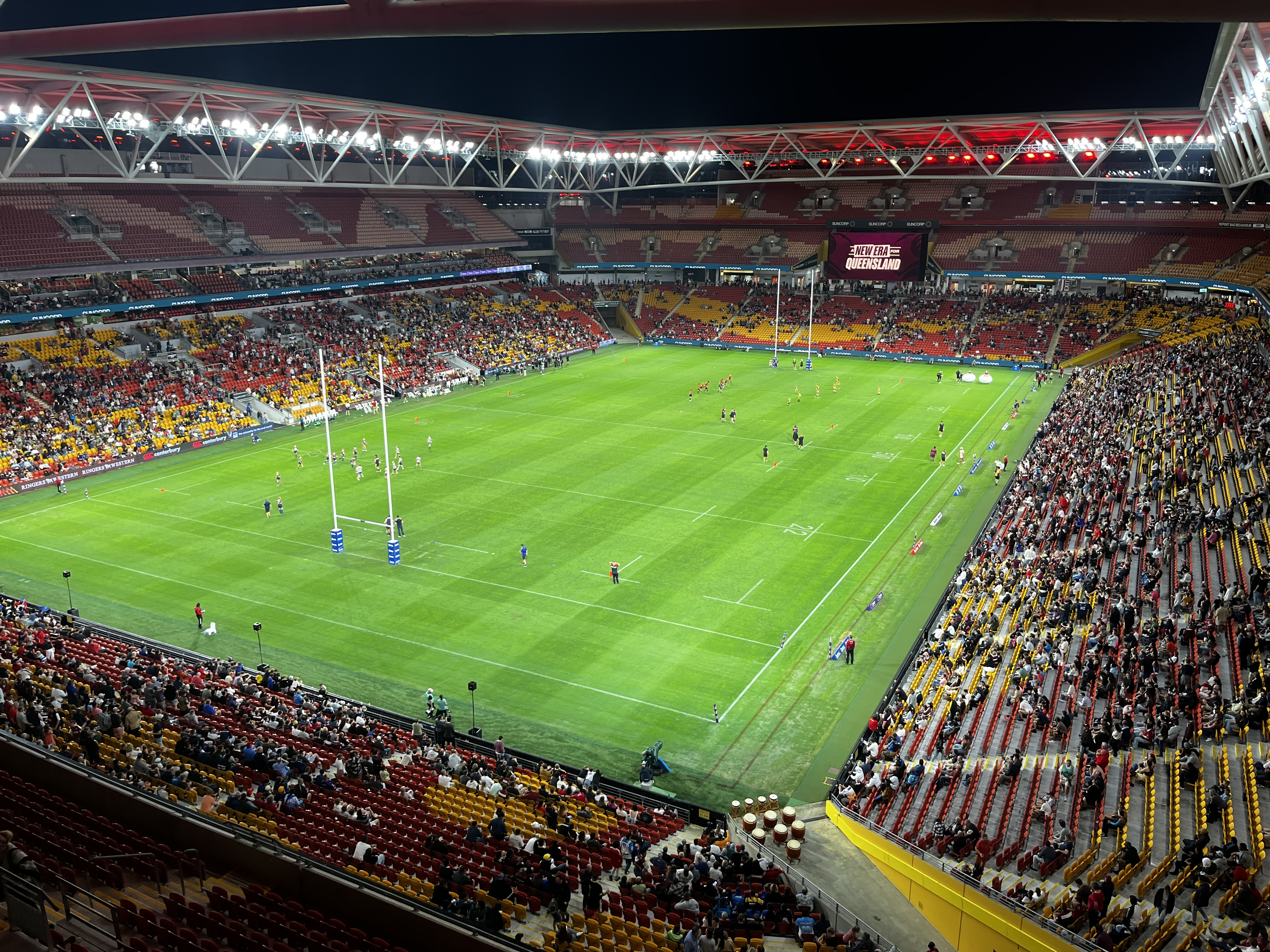
Lang Park will host Rugby sevens at the 2032 Summer Olympics in Brisbane.
