= Jenő Szántay =

Hungarian fencer (1881–1914)

Personal information
- Born: 10 March 1881
- Died: 11 December 1914 (aged 33) Limanowa, Poland

Sport
- Sport: Fencing

Jenő Szántay (10 March 1881 – 11 December 1914) was a Hungarian fencer. He competed in the individual sabre event at the 1908 Summer Olympics. He was killed in action during the Battle of Limanowa in World War I.

== See also ==
- List of Olympians killed in World War I
