= Louis Vernet (archer) =

French archer (1870–1946)

Olympic medal record

Men's Archery
Silver medal – second place	1908 London	Continental style

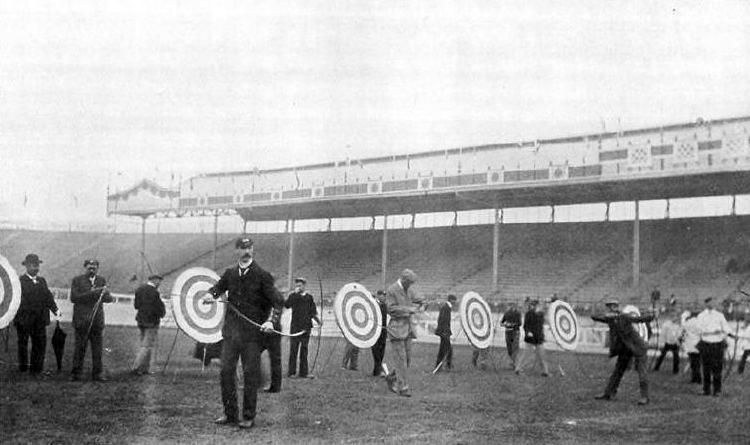

Louis Vernet (5 May 1870 – 19 March 1946) was a French archer. He won a silver medal at the 1908 Summer Olympics in London. Vernet entered the men's double York round event in 1908, taking 20th place with 385 points. His next competition, the Continental style, resulted in Vernet taking second place. His score of 256 points was only seven below that of the winner, Eugène Grisot.

== Sources ==
- Cook, Theodore Andrea (1908). The Fourth Olympiad, Being the Official Report. London: British Olympic Association.
- De Wael, Herman (2001). "Archery 1908". Herman's Full Olympians.
