= Weybridge F.C. =

Weybridge
- Full name: Weybridge Football Club
- Nickname(s): the Swallows
- Founded: 1876
- Dissolved: 1881
- Ground: Portmore Park
Home colours

Weybridge F.C., often referred to as Weybridge Swallows, was an English association football club, based at Portmore Park in Weybridge, Surrey.

== History ==
The club was founded in 1876 and used the Queen's Head public house for its facilities. The ground was known for its poor condition and spartan facilities.

The first known game for the club was at South Norwood in November 1878.

The club's only entry to the FA Cup was in 1880–81. The Swallows beat Henley at home in the first round and lost 3–0 at home to Upton Park in the second, conceding an own goal and a last-minute third.

== Esher Leopold ==
After the 1880–81 season, the club disbanded, its captain and players mostly forming the new Esher Leopold football club, which played at Sandown Park, close to the racecourse.

Esher's sole contribution to the national game was its one appearance in the FA Cup, a 5–0 home defeat to the holders, Old Carthusians, in 1881-82, although the club did reach the semi-finals of the first Surrey Senior Cup in 1882–83, losing to Reigate Priory. The club continued into the 1883–84 season.

== Successor club ==
A new Weybridge club was founded in 1892, playing its first match in October against the Walton club in the West Surrey League.

== Colours ==
The club wore black shirts, white shorts, and black stockings.
