= 1912 USFSA Football Championship =

Statistics of the USFSA Football Championship in the 1912 season.

== Tournament ==
=== First round ===
- CASG Orléans 4–1 Le Mans UC
- Union sportive Servannaise 5-0 Angers Université Club
- Sporting Club Dauphinois 1–3 FC Lyon
- US Tourcoing 5–0 Football club de Braux
- Société nautique de Bayonne 0–4 Stade Bordelais UC
- Cercle des Sports Stade Lorrain 4–3 Racing Club de Reims

=== Huitièmes de finale ===
- Stade Raphaëlois 2–2 SH Marseille (match replayed)
- Stade Raphaëlois 2–1 SH Marseille
- Olympique de Cette 3–2 Stade toulousain
- SM Caen 1–2 AS Française
- FC Rouen 2–1 Amiens SC
- US Tourcoing 5–1 Cercle des Sports Stade Lorrain
- Union sportive Servannaise 13–0 CASG Orléans
- Stade Bordelais UC 10–0 Sporting Club angérien
- FC Lyon 9–1 Racing Club Franc-Comtois de Besançon

=== Quarterfinals ===
- AS Française 3–1 Union sportive Servannaise
- US Tourcoing 3–2 FC Rouen
- Olympique de Cette 3–2 Stade Bordelais UC
- Stade Raphaëlois 4–1 FC Lyon

=== Semifinals ===
- Stade Raphaëlois 2–0 US Tourcoing
- AS Française 6–1 Olympique de Cette

=== Final ===
- Stade Raphaëlois 2–1 AS Française
