= Denmark at the 1908 Summer Olympics =

- IOC code: DEN
- NOC: Danish Sports Confederation
- Website: www.dif.dk (in Danish and English)

in London
- Competitors: 78 in 8 sports
- Flag bearer: Aage Holm
- Medals Ranked 16th: Gold 0 Silver 2 Bronze 3 Total 5

Summer Olympics appearances (overview)
- 1896; 1900; 1904; 1908; 1912; 1920; 1924; 1928; 1932; 1936; 1948; 1952; 1956; 1960; 1964; 1968; 1972; 1976; 1980; 1984; 1988; 1992; 1996; 2000; 2004; 2008; 2012; 2016; 2020; 2024; 2028

Other related appearances
- 1906 Intercalated Games

Denmark competed at the 1908 Summer Olympics in London, England. No Danish athletes had competed in the 1904 Summer Olympics.

== Medalists ==
Medal	Name	Sport	Event	Date
Silver	Denmark national football team: Peter Andersen; Magnus Beck; Ødbert E. Bjarnholt; Harald Bohr; Charles Buchwald; Ludvig Drescher; Johannes Gandil; Knud Hansen; August Lindgren; Einar Middelboe; Kristian Middelboe; Nils Middelboe; Sophus Nielsen; Oskar Nørland; Bjørn Rasmussen; Vilhelm Wolfhagen	Football		October 24
Silver	Ludvig Dam	Swimming	Men's 100 m backstroke	July 17
Bronze	Anders Andersen	Wrestling	Men's Greco-Roman middleweight	July 25
Bronze	Carl Jensen	Wrestling	Men's Greco-Roman light heavyweight	July 22
Bronze	Søren Marinus Jensen	Wrestling	Men's Greco-Roman super heavyweight	July 24

== Results by event ==
=== Athletics ===
Event	Place	Athlete	Heats	Semifinals	Final
Men's 100 metres	Heats	Axel Petersen	11.5 seconds 2nd, heat 9	Did not advance	
Men's 1500 metres	Semi- finalist	Kjeld Nielsen	None held	Unknown; 6th, semifinal 2	Did not advance
Men's 5 miles	Semi- finalist	Julius Jørgensen	None held	Unknown; 3rd, semifinal 3	Did not advance
Men's 5 miles	Semi- finalist	Kjeld Nielsen	None held	Unknown; 4th, semifinal 2	Did not advance
Men's marathon	23rd	Julius Jørgensen	None held		3:47:44.0
Men's marathon	26th	Rudy Hansen	None held		3:53:15.0
Men's 3500 metre walk	6th	Charles Vestergaard	None held	17:07.0; 2nd, semifinal 2	17:21.8
Men's 3500 metre walk	Semi- finalist	Arne Højme	None held	17:23.4; 6th, semifinal 1	Did not advance
Men's 10 mile walk	—	Arne Højme	None held	Did not finish —, semifinal 1	Did not advance
Men's 10 mile walk	—	Charles Vestergaard	None held	Did not finish —, semifinal 2	Did not advance

Event	Place	Athlete	Height/ Distance
Men's standing long jump	8-25	Svend Langkjær	Unknown
Men's standing high jump	8th	Svend Langkjær	1.42 metres
Men's hammer throw	10-19	Harald Agger	Unknown

=== Boxing ===
2 Danish boxers competed in the lightweight class, with each losing his first bout.

Weight class	Place	Boxer	Round of 16	Quarter- finals	Semi- finals	Final
Lightweight; Up to 140 pounds	7th	Hemming Hansen	Lost to Johnson; 2-0 decision	Did not advance		
Lightweight; Up to 140 pounds	7th	Waldemar Holberg	Lost to Wells; 4th-round decision	Did not advance		

Opponent nation	Wins	Losses	Percent
Great Britain	0	2	.000
Total	0	2	.000

=== Fencing ===
Event	Place	Fencer	First round	Second round	Semi- final	Final
Men's épée	Semi- finalist	Lauritz Christian Østrup	5-1 (1st in A)	3-1 (1st in 2)	5-5 (6th in 2)	Did not advance
Men's épée	Second round	Ivan Osiier	5-3 (2nd in E)	2-2 (3rd in 2)	Did not advance	
Men's épée	Second round	Ejnar Levison	3-2 (2nd in C)	1-4 (5th in 1)	Did not advance	
Men's épée	First round	Herbert Sander	2-4 (4th in B)	Did not advance		
Men's épée	First round	Otto Becker	4-4 (4th in D)	Did not advance		
Men's épée	First round	Frantz Jørgensen	3-4 (5th in I)	Did not advance		
Men's sabre	Semi- finalist	Lauritz Østrup	4-1 (1st in I)	2-1 (2nd in 8)	3-4 (6th in 2)	Did not advance
Men's sabre	Second round	Einar Schwartz-Nielsen	2-1 (1st in E)	0-3 (4th in 8)	Did not advance	
Men's sabre	First round	Harald Krenchel	1-3 (5th in D)	Did not advance		

Event	Place	Fencers	Play-in match	First round	Semi- finals	Final	Repechage	Silver medal match
Men's team épée	4th	Ejnar Levison (all); Ivan Osiier (all); Lauritz Østrup (1st); Herbert Sander (all); Otto Becker (rep)	Bye	Lost to France; 10-6 Relegated to repechage	Did not advance		Lost to Great Britain; 9-8 Out; 4th place	Did not advance

=== Football ===
Denmark was represented by the Denmark national football team.

Event	Place	Players	First round	Semifinals	Final	Bronze match
Men's football	2nd	P. Marius Andersen, Harald Bohr, Charles Buchwald, Ludvig Drescher, Johannes Gandil, Harald Hansen, August Lindgren, Kristian Middelboe (captain), Nils Middelboe, Sophus Nielsen, Oscar Nielsen-Nørland, Bjørn Rasmussen, Vilhelm Wolffhagen	Won vs. France B 9-0	Won vs. France A 17-1	Lost vs. Great Britain; 2-0	Not relegated

=== Gymnastics ===
Event	Place	Gymnast	Score
Men's team	4th	Carl Andersen, Hans Bredmose, Jens Chievitz, Arvor Hansen, Christian Hansen, Ingvardt Hansen, Einar Hermann, Knud Holm, Poul Holm, Oluf Husted-Nielsen, Charles Jensen, Gorm Jensen, Hendrik Johansen, Harald Klem, Robert Madsen, Viggo Meulengracht-Madsen, Lukas Nielsen, Oluf Olsson, Niels Petersen, Nicolai Philipsen, Hendrik Rasmussen, Viktor Rasmussen, Marius Thuesen, Niels Turin-Nielsen	378

=== Shooting ===
Event	Place	Shooter	Score
Men's 300 metre free rifle	14th	Lars Jørgen Madsen	813
Men's 300 metre free rifle	18th	Christian Pedersen	780
Men's 300 metre free rifle	21st	Hans Christian Schultz	769
Men's 300 metre free rifle	33rd	Niels Laursen	712
Men's 300 metre free rifle	42nd	Poul Liebst	645
Men's 300 metre free rifle	48th	Christian Christensen	501
Men's 300 metre free rifle	51st	Lorents Jensen	321
Men's team free rifle	4th	Niels Andersen; Lars Jørgen Madsen; Ole Olsen; Christian Christensen; Christian Pedersen; Hans Christian Schultz	4543
Men's team military rifle	8th	Niels Andersen; Christian Christensen; Lorents Jensen; Niels Laursen; Julius Hillemann-Jensen; Ole Olsen	1909

=== Swimming ===
Event	Place	Swimmer	Heats	Semifinals	Final
Men's 100 metre freestyle	Heats	Harald Klem	Unknown; 3-6, heat 1	Did not advance	
Men's 100 metre freestyle	Heats	Poul Holm	Unknown; 3-5, heat 3	Did not advance	
Men's 100 metre freestyle	Heats	Hjalmar Saxtorph	Unknown; 4-5, heat 5	Did not advance	
Men's 400 metre freestyle	Heats	Aage Holm	8:08.8; 2nd, heat 5	Did not advance	
Men's 400 metre freestyle	Heats	Hjalmar Saxtorph	Unknown; 4-5, heat 7	Did not advance	
Men's 100 metre backstroke	2nd	Ludvig Dam	1:26.4; 2nd, heat 4	Unknown; 2nd, semifinal 1	1:26.6
Men's 200 metre breaststroke	Heats	Harald Klem	Unknown; 3rd, heat 6	Did not advance	
Men's 4x200 metre freestyle relay	Semi- finalist	Poul Holm; Harald Klem; John Ludvig Dam; Hjalmar Saxtorph	None held	12:53.0; 2nd, semifinal 1	Did not advance

=== Wrestling ===
Event	Place	Wrestler	Round of 32	Round of 16	Quarter- finals	Semi- finals	Final
Greco-Roman lightweight	5th	Anders Møller	Defeated; Whittingstall	Defeated; Faulkner	Lost to Lindén	Did not advance	
Greco-Roman lightweight	9th	Carl Carlsen	Defeated; Steens	Lost to Lindén	Did not advance		
Greco-Roman lightweight	17th	Christian Carlsen	Lost to Hawkins	Did not advance			
Greco-Roman middleweight	3rd	Anders Andersen	Bye	Defeated; Lorenz	Defeated; Belmer	Lost to Mårtensson	Defeated (walkover); Jósepsson
Greco-Roman middleweight	5th	Johannes Eriksen	Bye	Defeated; E. Bacon	Lost to Andersson	Did not advance	
Greco-Roman middleweight	5th	Axel Larsson	Defeated; Duijm	Defeated; Lelie	Lost to Mårtensson	Did not advance	
Greco-Roman light heavyweight	3rd	Carl Jensen	Bye	Defeated; Oosten	Defeated; Banbrook	Lost to Saarela	Defeated; Payr
Greco-Roman light heavyweight	17th	Harald Christiansen	Lost to Larsson	Did not advance			
Greco-Roman light heavyweight	17th	Henri Nielsen	Lost to Saarela	Did not advance			
Greco-Roman super heavyweight	3rd	Søren Marinus Jensen	None held		Bye	Lost to Weisz	Defeated; Payr
Greco-Roman super heavyweight	5th	Carl Jensen	None held		Lost to Weisz	Did not advance	

Opponent nation	Wins	Losses	Percent
Belgium	1	0	1.000
Finland	0	4	.000
Great Britain	4	1	.800
Hungary	3	2	.600
Netherlands	5	0	1.000
Sweden	1	5	.167
Total international	14	12	.538
Denmark	1	1	.500
Total	15	13	.536

== Sources ==
- Cook, Theodore Andrea (1908). The Fourth Olympiad, Being the Official Report. London: British Olympic Association.
- De Wael, Herman (2001). "Top London 1908 Olympians". Herman's Full Olympians. Archived from the original on 12 July 2006.
- Reyes, Macario (2001). "IV. Olympiad London 1908 Football Tournament". Rec.Sport.Soccer Statistics Foundation.
