= Hungary at the 1908 Summer Olympics =

- IOC code: HUN
- NOC: Hungarian Olympic Committee

in London
- Competitors: 63 in 8 sports
- Flag bearer: István Mudin
- Medals Ranked 6th: Gold 3 Silver 4 Bronze 2 Total 9

Summer Olympics appearances (overview)
- 1896; 1900; 1904; 1908; 1912; 1920; 1924; 1928; 1932; 1936; 1948; 1952; 1956; 1960; 1964; 1968; 1972; 1976; 1980; 1984; 1988; 1992; 1996; 2000; 2004; 2008; 2012; 2016; 2020; 2024; 2028

Other related appearances
- 1906 Intercalated Games

Hungary competed at the 1908 Summer Olympics in London, England. Austria and Hungary had separate NOCs, therefore results at Olympic Games are kept separate despite the union of the two nations as Austria-Hungary at the time.

== Medalists ==
Medal	Name	Sport	Event	Date
Gold	Richárd Weisz	Wrestling	Men's Greco-Roman super heavyweight	24 July
Gold	Jenő Fuchs	Fencing	Men's sabre	24 July
Gold	Jenő Fuchs; Oszkár Gerde; Péter Tóth; Lajos Werkner; Dezső Földes	Fencing	Men's team sabre	24 July
Silver	Zoltán Halmay	Swimming	Men's 100 metre freestyle	20 July
Silver	István Somodi	Athletics	Men's high jump	21 July
Silver	Béla Zulawszky	Fencing	Men's sabre	24 July
Silver	József Munk; Imre Zachár; Béla Las-Torres; Zoltán Halmay	Swimming	Men's 4 × 200 metre freestyle relay	24 July
Bronze	Pál Simon; Frigyes Mezei; József Nagy; Ödön Bodor; Vilmos Rácz	Athletics	Men's medley relay	25 July
Bronze	Károly Levitzky	Rowing	Men's single sculls	31 July

Default sort order: Medal, Date, Name

Medals by sport
Sport	1st place, gold medalist(s)	2nd place, silver medalist(s)	3rd place, bronze medalist(s)	Total
Fencing	2	1	0	3
Wrestling	1	0	0	1
Swimming	0	2	0	2
Athletics	0	1	1	2
Rowing	0	0	1	1
Total	3	4	2	9

=== Multiple medalists ===
The following competitors won multiple medals at the 1908 Olympic Games.

Name	Medal	Sport	Event
Jenő Fuchs	Gold; Gold	Fencing	Men's sabre Men's team sabre
Zoltán Halmay	Silver; Silver	Swimming	Men's 100 m freestyle Men's 4×200 m freestyle relay

== Competitors ==
The following is the list of number of competitors participating in the Games:

Sport	Men	Women	Total
Athletics	18	0	18
Fencing	8	0	8
Gymnastics	5	0	5
Rowing	11	0	11
Shooting	2	0	2
Swimming	10	0	10
Tennis	3	0	3
Wrestling	7	0	7
Total	63	0	63

The following is the list of dates, when Hungary won medals:

Medals by date
Date	Gold medal	Silver medal	Bronze medal	Total
20 July	0	1	0	1
21 July	0	1	0	1
24 July	3	2	0	5
31 July	0	0	1	1
Total	3	4	2	9

== Results by event ==
=== Athletics ===
Hungary's best athletics result was István Somodi's silver medal in the high jump. The Hungarian medley relay team took the bronze medal.

Event	Place	Athlete	Heats	Semifinals	Final
Men's 100 metres	Heats	Vilmos Rácz	11.4 seconds 2nd, heat 15	Did not advance	
Men's 100 metres	Heats	Pál Simon	11.5 seconds 2nd, heat 11	Did not advance	
Men's 100 metres	Heats	Frigyes Mezei	Unknown; 4th, heat 14	Did not advance	
Men's 200 metres	Semi- finalist	Károly Radóczy	Walkover; 1st, heat 7	Unknown; 3rd, semifinal 1	Did not advance
Men's 200 metres	Heats	Vilmos Rácz	Unknown; 2nd, heat 4	Did not advance	
Men's 200 metres	Heats	Frigyes Mezei	Unknown; 2nd, heat 6	Did not advance	
Men's 200 metres	Heats	Pál Simon	Unknown; 4th, heat 10	Did not advance	
Men's 400 metres	Heats	József Nagy	Unknown; 2nd, heat 7	Did not advance	
Men's 800 metres	4th	Ödön Bodor	None held	1:58.6; 1st, semifinal 1	1:55.4
Men's 800 metres	Semi- finalist	József Nagy	None held	Unknown; 4th, semifinal 3	Did not advance
Men's 1500 metres	Semi- finalist	József Nagy	None held	Unknown; 2nd, semifinal 5	Did not advance
Men's 1500 metres	Semi- finalist	Ödön Bodor	None held	Unknown; 8th, semifinal 1	Did not advance
Men's 110 metre hurdles	Heats	Nándor Kovács	Unknown; 2nd, heat 10	Did not advance	
Men's 400 metre hurdles	Semi- finalist	Nándor Kovács	Walkover; 1st, heat 9	Did not finish —, semifinal 2	Did not advance
Men's 3200 metre steeplechase	—	Antal Lovas	None held	Did not finish —, semifinal 2	Did not advance
Men's medley relay	3rd	Pál Simon; Frigyes Mezei; József Nagy; Ödön Bodor	None held	3:32.6; 1st, semifinal 1	3:32.5
Men's 5 miles	—	Antal Lovas	None held	Did not finish —, semifinal 6	Did not advance
Men's marathon	—	L. Merenyi	None held		Did not start
Men's 3500 metre walk	19th	István Drubina	None held	18:44.6; 4th, semifinal 2	Did not advance

Event	Place	Athlete	Height/ Distance
Men's high jump	2nd	István Somodi	1.88 metres
Men's high jump	13th	József Haluszinsky	1.72 metres
Men's long jump	14th	Ödön Holits	6.54 metres
Men's long jump	21-32	Géza Kovesdi	Unknown
Men's pole vault	8th	Károly Szathmáry	3.35 metres
Men's shot put	9-25	István Mudin	Unknown
Men's shot put	9-25	Mór Kóczán	Unknown
Men's discus throw	7th	György Luntzer	38.34 metres
Men's discus throw	12-42	Ferenc Jesina	Unknown
Men's discus throw	12-42	Imre Mudin	Unknown
Men's discus throw	12-42	Mór Kóczán	Unknown
Men's hammer throw	10-19	István Mudin	Unknown
Men's Greek discus	7th	István Mudin	33.11 metres
Men's Greek discus	11-23	György Luntzer	Unknown
Men's Greek discus	11-23	Imre Mudin	Unknown
Men's Greek discus	11-23	Mór Kóczán	Unknown
Men's freestyle javelin	7th	Imre Mudin	45.97 metres
Men's freestyle javelin	10-33	Ferenc Jesina	Unknown
Men's freestyle javelin	10-33	György Luntzer	Unknown
Men's freestyle javelin	10-33	István Mudin	Unknown
Men's freestyle javelin	10-33	Mór Kóczán	Unknown

=== Fencing ===
Hungary dominated the sabre competitions, taking the top two individual medals and the team gold.

Event	Place	Fencer	First round	Second round	Semi- final	Final
Men's épée	First round	Béla Zulawszky	2-4 (4th in J)	Did not advance		
Men's épée	First round	Péter Tóth	1-3 (4th in M)	Did not advance		
Men's épée	First round	Dezső Földes	1-5 (6th in G)	Did not advance		
Men's sabre	1st	Jenő Fuchs	5-0 (1st in K)	3-1 (1st in 1)	6-1 (1st in 1)	6-1
Men's sabre	2nd	Béla Zulawszky	3-2 (3rd in H)	2-1 (2nd in 4)	5-2 (1st in 2)	6-1
Men's sabre	4th	Jenő Szántay	3-1 (1st in F)	3-1 (2nd in 6)	4-3 (3rd in 1)	3-4
Men's sabre	5th	Péter Tóth	2-2 (2nd in B)	4-0 (1st in 6)	5-2 (1st in 2)	3-4
Men's sabre	6th	Lajos Werkner	5-1 (1st in M)	4-0 (1st in 2)	5-2 (2nd in 1)	2-5
Men's sabre	Second round	Deszö Földes	5-0 (1st in G)	3-1 (2nd in 2)	3-4 (5th in 1)	Did not advance
Men's sabre	Second round	Oszkár Gerde	4-1 (1st in I)	4-0 (1st in 5)	4-3 (5th in 2)	Did not advance
Men's sabre	First round	Jenő Apáthy	5-2 (2nd in J)	2-1 (3rd in 8)	Did not advance	

Event	Place	Fencers	Play-in match	First round	Semi- finals	Final	Repechage	Silver medal match
Men's team sabre	1st	Jenő Fuchs (1st, sf, f); Oszkár Gerde (1st, sf, f); Péter Tóth (1st, sf, f); Lajos Werkner (1st, f) Deszö Földes (sf); Apáthy Jenő	Not held	Defeated Germany; 9-0 Advanced to semifinal	Defeated Italy; 11-5 Advanced to final	Defeated Bohemia; 9-7 Won gold medal	Not relegated	

=== Gymnastics ===
Gymnast	Event	Score	Rank
János Nyisztor	Men's all-around	236	15
Kálmán Szabó	Men's all-around	209	34
Imre Gellért	Men's all-around	202.5	39
Mihály Antos	Men's all-around	192.5	47
Frigyes Gráf	Men's all-around	141.5	77

=== Rowing ===
Event	Place	Rowers	First round	Quarter- finals	Semi- finals	Final
Men's single sculls	3rd	Károly Levitzky	Bye	10.8; 1st, quarterfinal 2	Unknown; 2nd, semifinal 1	Did not advance
Men's single sculls	9th	Ernö Killer	Did not finish —, heat 1	Did not advance		
Men's eight	5th	Klekner Sándor, Haraszthy Lajos, Szebeny Antal, Éder Róbert, Hautzinger Sándor, Várady Jenö, Wampetich Imre, Kirchknopf Ferenc, Vasko Kálmán	None held	Unknown; 2nd, quarterfinal 2	Did not advance	

=== Shooting ===
Event	Place	Shooter	Score
Men's 300 metre free rifle	43rd	Sándor Prokopp	627
Men's 300 metre free rifle	49th	Kálmán Móricz	490

=== Swimming ===
Event	Place	Swimmer	Heats	Semifinals	Final
Men's 100 metre freestyle	2nd	Zoltán Halmay	1:08.2; 1st, heat 1	1:09.4; 1st, semifinal 1	1:06.2
Men's 100 metre freestyle	Heats	József Ónody	1:13.2; 2nd, heat 5	Did not advance	
Men's 100 metre freestyle	Heats	József Munk	Unknown; 3-5, heat 2	Did not advance	
Men's 100 metre freestyle	Heats	Henrik Hajós	Unknown; 3-5, heat 3	Did not advance	
Men's 400 metre freestyle	Semi- finalist	Béla Las-Torres	5:52.2; 2nd, heat 1	Unknown; 4th, semifinal 1	Did not advance
Men's 400 metre freestyle	Semi- finalist	Henrik Hajós	6:19.8; 1st, heat 9	Unknown; 5th, semifinal 1	Did not advance
Men's 400 metre freestyle	Semi- finalist	Imre Zachár	6:09.8; 1st, heat 8	Did not finish —, semifinal 2	Did not advance
Men's 400 metre freestyle	Heats	József Ónody	Unknown; 3rd, heat 7	Did not advance	
Men's 100 metre backstroke	—	Sándor Kugler	Disqualified —, heat 1	Did not advance	
Men's 200 metre breaststroke	4th	Ödön Toldi	3:14.4; 1st, heat 4	3:16.4; 2nd, semifinal 1	3:15.2
Men's 200 metre breaststroke	Semi- finalist	József Fabinyi	3:23.4; 1st, heat 6	Unknown; 4th, semifinal 1	Did not advance
Men's 200 metre breaststroke	Heats	András Baronyi	3:18.0; 2nd, heat 2	Did not advance	
Men's 4x200 metre freestyle relay	2nd	József Munk; Imre Zachár; Béla las Torres; Zoltán Halmay	None held	Swam over 1st, semifinal 3	10:59.0

=== Tennis ===
Event	Place	Name	Round of 64	Round of 32	Round of 16	Quarter- finals	Semi- finals	Final
Men's singles	16th	Dezső Lauber	Bye	Lost to Dixon	Did not advance			
Men's singles	16th	Ede Tóth	Defeated Micovský	Lost to Parke	Did not advance			
Men's singles	16th	Jenő Zsigmondy	Bye	Lost to Hykš	Did not advance			
Men's doubles	7th	Jenő Zsigmondy; Ede Tóth	None held	Bye	Lost to Ritchie/Parke	Did not advance		

Opponent nation	Wins	Losses	Percent
Bohemia	1	1	.500
Great Britain	0	3	.000
Total	1	4	.200

=== Wrestling ===
Event	Place	Wrestler	Round of 32	Round of 16	Quarter- finals	Semi- finals	Final
Greco-Roman lightweight	5th	József Maróthy	Defeated; Rose	Defeated; Wood	Lost to Persson	Did not advance	
Greco-Roman lightweight	5th	Ödön Radvány	Defeated; Ruff	Defeated; Hawkins	Lost to Orlov	Did not advance	
Greco-Roman lightweight	9th	József Téger	Defeated; Moppes	Lost to Porro	Did not advance		
Greco-Roman middleweight	9th	Miklós Orosz	Bye	Lost to Jósepsson	Did not advance		
Greco-Roman light heavyweight	4th	Hugó Payr	Bye	Defeated; Zamotin	Defeated; Westrop	Lost to Weckman	Lost to Jensen
Greco-Roman light heavyweight	17th	György Luntzer	Lost to Wijbrands	Did not advance			
Greco-Roman super heavyweight	1st	Richárd Weisz	None held		Defeated; C. Jensen	Defeated; S. Jensen	Defeated; Petrov
Greco-Roman super heavyweight	4th	Hugó Payr	None held		Defeated; Barrett	Lost to Petrov	Lost to S. Jensen

Opponent nation	Wins	Losses	Percent
Denmark	2	3	.400
Finland	0	1	.000
Great Britain	5	0	1.000
Italy	0	1	.000
Netherlands	2	1	.667
Russia	2	2	.500
Sweden	0	1	.000
Total	11	9	.550

== Sources ==
- Cook, Theodore Andrea (1908). The Fourth Olympiad, Being the Official Report. London: British Olympic Association.
- De Wael, Herman (2001). "Top London 1908 Olympians". Herman's Full Olympians. Archived from the original on 12 July 2006.
