= List of amateur wrestlers =

Listed are wrestlers who wrestled in either freestyle, Greco-Roman, collegiate, or associated amateur wrestling styles. These wrestlers should not be confused with the sports entertainment form of professional wrestling.

== Armenia ==
- Ara Abrahamian – 2004 Olympic silver medalist (for Sweden)
- Artur Aleksanyan – 2016 Olympic gold medalist, 2012 Olympic bronze medalist, 2014 and 2015 World champion
- Roman Amoyan – 2008 Olympic bronze medalist, 2006 and 2011 European champion
- Mkkhitar Manukyan – 2004 Olympic bronze medalist (for Kazakhstan)
- Armen Mkrtchyan – 1996 Olympic silver medalist
- Armen Nazaryan – 1996 Olympic gold medalist, 2000 Olympic gold medalist (for Bulgaria), 2004 Olympic bronze medalist (for Bulgaria)
- Arsen Julfalakyan – 2012 Olympic silver medalist
- Levon Julfalakyan – 1988 Olympic gold medalist (for Soviet Union)
- Alfred Ter-Mkrtychyan – 1992 Olympic silver medalist (for Unified Team)
- Artem Teryan – 1952 Olympic bronze medalist (for Soviet Union)

== Azerbaijan ==
- Namig Abdullayev – 2000 Olympic gold medalist, 1996 Olympic silver medalist
- Emin Ahmadov – 2012 Olympics bronze medalist
- Haji Aliyev – 2020 Olympic silver medalist, 2016 Olympic bronze medalist, three-time World champion
- Toghrul Asgarov – 2012 Olympic gold medalist, 2016 Olympic silver medalist
- Rovshan Bayramov – 2008 Olympic silver medalist, 2012 Olympic silver medalist
- Rasul Chunayev – 2016 Olympic bronze medalist, 2015 World champion
- Khetag Gazyumov – 2008 Olympic bronze medalist, 2012 Olympic bronze medalist, 2016 Olympic silver medalist, 2010 World champion
- Jabrayil Hasanov – 2016 Olympic bronze medalist
- Rafig Huseynov – 2020 Olympic bronze medalist, two-time World champion
- Farid Mansurov – 2004 Olympic gold medalist, two-time World champion
- Vitaliy Rahimov – 2008 Olympic silver medalist
- Yuliya Ratkevich – 2012 Olympic bronze medalist
- Sabah Shariati – 2016 Olympic bronze medalist
- Sharif Sharifov – 2012 Olympic gold medalist and 2016 Olympic bronze medalist, 2011 World champion
- Mariya Stadnik – 2012 and 2016 Olympic silver medalist, 2008 and 2020 Olympic bronze medalist, two-time World champion
- Nataliya Synyshyn – 2016 Olympic bronze medalist

== Australia ==
- Richard Garrard – 1948 Olympic silver medalist, three-time Commonwealth Games gold medalist
- Eddie Scarf – 1932 Olympic bronze medalist

== Austria ==
- Nikolaus Hirschl – 1932 Olympic 2-time bronze medalist, European Heavyweight champion, 10-time Austrian Heavyweight champion

== Belarus ==
- Dmitry Debelka – 2000 Olympic bronze medalist
- Viachaslau Makaranka – 2004 Olympic bronze medalist
- Valeriy Tsilent – 1996 Olympic bronze medalist

== Belgium ==
- Joseph Mewis – 1956 Olympic silver medalist
- Pierre Ollivier – 1924 Olympic silver medalist
- Clement Spapen – 1928 Olympic silver medalist

== Bulgaria ==
- Ismail Abilov – 1980 Olympic gold medalist (74 – 82 kg)
- Lyutvi Akhmedov – 1964 Olympic silver medalist (+ 97 kg)
- Stefan Angelov – 1972 Olympic bronze medalist (- 48 kg), 1976 Olympic bronze medalist (- 48 kg)
- Stoyan Apostolov – 1972 Olympic silver medalist (62 – 68 kg)
- Stoyan Balov – 1988 Olympic silver medalist (52 – 57 kg)
- Serafim Barzakov – 2000 Olympic silver medalist (58 – 63 kg)
- Krali Bimbalov – 1960 Olympic silver medalist (79 – 87 kg)
- Slavcho Chervenkov – 1980 Olympic silver medalist (90 – 100 kg)
- Dimitar Dobrev – 1960 Olympic gold medalist (73 – 79 kg), 1956 Olympic silver medalist (73 – 79 kg)
- Miho Dukov – 1980 Olympic silver medalist (57 – 62 kg)
- Osman Duraliev – 1968 and 1972 Olympic silver medalist (+97 kg, +100 kg)
- Prodan Gardzhev – 1964 Olympic gold medalist (78 – 87 kg), 1968 Olympic bronze medalist (78 – 87 kg)
- Rangel Gerovski – 1988 Olympic silver medalist (+ 130 kg)
- Valentin Getsov – 1992 Olympic silver medalist (62 – 68 kg)
- Kamen Goranov – 1976 Olympic silver medalist (90 – 100 kg)
- Khasan Isaev – 1976 Olympic gold medalist (- 48 kg)
- Stancho Ivanov – 1960 Olympic silver medalist (57 – 62 kg)
- Stoyan Ivanov – 1976 Olympic silver medalist (82 – 90 kg)
- Angel Kerezov – 1964 Olympic silver medalist (- 52 kg)
- Petar Kirov – 1968 Olympic gold medalist (- 52 kg), 1972 Olympic gold medalist (48 – 52 kg)
- Ivan Kolev – 1976 Olympic bronze medalist (74 – 82 kg)
- Stancho Kolev – 1964 Olympic silver medalist (57 – 63 kg)
- Atanas Komchev – 1988 Olympic gold medalist (82 – 90 kg)
- Dimo Kostov – 1976 Olympic bronze medalist (90 – 100 kg)
- Ivan Krastev – 1972 Olympic bronze medalist (57 – 62 kg)
- Georgi Markov – 1972 Olympic gold medalist (57 – 62 kg)
- Hussein Mehmedov – 1956 Olympic silver medalist (+ 87 kg)
- Mladen Mladenov – 1980 Olympic bronze medalist (48 – 52 kg)
- Said Mustafov – 1964 Olympic bronze medalist (87 – 97 kg)
- Ognyan Nikolov – 1972 Olympic silver medalist (- 48 kg)
- Pavel Pavlov – 1980 Olympic bronze medalist (74 – 82 kg)
- Kiril Petkov – 1964 Olympic silver medalist (70 – 78 kg)
- Dinko Petrov – 1960 Olympic bronze medalist (52 – 57 kg)
- Boyan Radev – 1964 Olympic gold medalist (87 – 97 kg), 1968 Olympic gold medalist (87 – 97 kg)
- Ivan Radnev – 1994 World silver medalist
- Georgi Raikov – 1980 Olympic gold medalist (90 – 100 kg)
- Valentin Raychev – 1980 Olympic gold medalist (68 – 74 kg)
- Nermedin Selimov – 1980 Olympic bronze medalist (48 – 52 kg)
- Simeon Shterev – 1988 Olympic bronze medalist (57 – 62 kg)
- Petko Sirakov – 1956 Olympic silver medalist (79 – 87 kg)
- Nikola Stanchev – 1956 Olympic gold medalist (73 – 79 kg)
- Rahmat Sukra – 1988 Olympic bronze medalist (68 – 74 kg)
- Kiril Terziev – 2008 Olympic bronze medalist (66 – 74 kg)
- Enyu Todorov – 1968 Olympic silver medalist (57 – 63 kg)
- Bratan Tzenov – 1988 Olympic bronze medalist (- 48 kg)
- Ivan Tzonov – 1988 Olympic silver medalist (- 48 kg)
- Aleksandar Tomov – 1972 Olympic silver medalist (+ 100), 1976 Olympic silver medalist (+ 100), 1980 Olympic silver medalist (+ 100)
- Enyu Valchev – 1960 Olympic bronze medalist (62 – 67 kg), 1964 Olympic gold medalist (62 – 67 kg), 1968 Olympic silver medalist (63 – 70 kg), 1962 World gold medalist (62 – 67 kg)
- Zhivko Vangelov – 1988 Olympic silver medalist (57 – 62 kg)
- Radoslav Velikov – 2008 Olympic bronze medalist (- 54 kg)
- Yavor Yanakiev – 2008 Olympic bronze medalist (66 – 74 kg)
- Ivan Yankov – 1980 Olympic silver medalist (62 – 68 kg)
- Valentin Yordanov – 1996 Olympic gold medalist in up to 52 kg weight class, seven-time World Champion (1983, '85, '87, '89, '93, '94, and '95), seven-time European Champion (1982, '83, '85, '86, '87, '88, and '89), and the only wrestler to hold 10 World Championship medals (7 gold, 2 silver and 1 bronze)
- Nezhdet Zalev – 1960 Olympic silver medalist (52 – 57 kg)

== Canada ==
- Gary Bohay (born 1960) – 1989 World silver medalist
- Andy Borodow (born 1969) – Canadian Olympic wrestler, Maccabiah champion, Commonwealth champion
- Arjan Bhullar – two-time NAIA Champion, CIS Champion, Commonwealth Games Champion, Olympian, ONE Heavyweight Champion
- Justina Di Stasio – 2018 World gold medalist, 2017 World bronze medalist
- Martine Dugrenier – 2008, 2009, 2010 World gold medalist, 2005, 2006, 2007 World silver medalist
- Carol Huynh – 2008 Olympic Champion, 2012 Olympic Bronze
- Daniel Igali – 2000 Olympic gold medalist, World Champion
- Garry Kallos (born 1956) – wrestler and sambo competitor
- Jessica MacDonald – 2012 World gold medalist, 2011 & 2013 World bronze medalist
- Linda Morais – 2019 World gold medalist, 2016 World bronze medalist
- Christine Nordhagen – 6x World Champion, 3x World Silver, 1 World Bronze,
- Guivi Sissaouri – 1996 Olympic silver medalist, 1 World Champion, 1 World Silver, 2 time World Bronze
- Howard Stupp (born 1955) – Olympian, won five Canadian championships (1976, 1978, 1979, 1980, 1981), two Pan Am Games titles (1975, 1979), two Canadian Interuniversity Athletics Union championships, and four titles at the Maccabiah Games in Israel
- Erica Wiebe – 2016 Olympic Champion, 2019 & 2018 World bronze medalist
- Tonya Verbeek – 2004 & 2012 Olympic Silver, 2008 Olympic Bronze, 2011 World Silver, 2005 & 2009 World Bronze

== China ==
- Zhang Fengliu – 2016 Olympic bronze medalist
- Sheng Jiang – 2008 Olympic bronze medalist
- Wang Jiao – 2008 Olympic gold medalist
- Xu Li – 2008 Olympic silver medalist
- Zhou Qian – 2020 Olympic bronze medalist
- Pang Qianyu – 2020 Olympic silver medalist, 2024 Olympic bronze medalist
- Jing Ruixue – 2012 Olympic silver medalist
- Walihan Sailike – 2020 Olympic bronze medalist
- Wang Xu – 2004 Olympic gold medalist
- Sun Yanan – 2020 Olympic silver medalist, 2016 Olympic bronze medalist
- Chang Yongxiang – 2008 Olympic silver medalist
- Sheng Zetian – 1992, 1996 and 2000 Olympic bronze medalist

== Cuba ==
- Feliberto Ascuy – 1996 and 2000 Olympic gold medalist
- Michel Batista – 2008 Olympic bronze medalist
- Ismael Borrero – 2016 Olympic gold medalist, 2015 and 2019 World gold medalist
- Iván Fundora – 2004 Olympic bronze medalist, 2007 World bronze
- Yusneylys Guzmán – 2024 Olympic silver medalist
- Liván López – 2012 Olympic bronze medalist, 2013 World bronze, 2014 and 2011 World bronze
- Mijaín López – 2008, 2012, 2016, 2020 and 2024 Olympic gold medalist, 5-time World Champion, 3-time world second, only wrestler ever to win 5 Olympic gold medals
- Yasmany Lugo – 2016 Olympic silver medalist
- Juan Marén – 1992 Olympic bronze medalist, 1996, 2000 Olympic silver medalist
- Milaimys Marín – 2024 Olympic bronze medalist
- Yandro Miguel Quintana – 2004 Olympic gold medalist
- Héctor Milián – 1992 Olympic gold medalist, 1991 World Champion
- Roberto Monzon – 2004 Olympic silver medalist
- Luis Orta – 2020 Olympic gold medalist, 2024 Olympic bronze medalist
- Alejandro Puerto – 1992 Olympic gold medalist, two-time World Champion
- Lázaro Rivas – 2000 Olympic silver, 1999 World Champion, 2003 and 2001 World bronze
- Alexis Rodríguez – 2000 Olympic bronze medalist, 1998 World Champion, 2001 World silver
- Yoel Romero – 2000 Olympic silver medalist, 1999 World Champion, World second twice, World third twice
- Gabriel Rosillo – 2024 Olympic bronze medalist
- Alexis Vila – 1996 Olympic bronze medalist

== Czechoslovakia ==
- Mikuláš Athanasov – 1952 Olympic bronze medalist
- Petr Kment – 1968 Olympic bronze medalist
- Jozef Lohyňa – 1988 Olympic bronze medalist
- Vítězslav Mácha – 1972 Olympic gold medalist, 1976 Olympic silver medalist
- Josef Urban – 1932 Olympic silver medalist

== Denmark ==
- Anders Andersen – 1908 Olympic bronze medalist
- Turpal Bisultanov – 2024 Olympic bronze medalist
- Johannes Eriksen – 1920 Olympic bronze medalist
- Henrik Hansen – 1948 Olympic bronze medalist
- Poul Hansen – 1920 Olympic silver medalist
- Carl Jensen – 1908 Olympic bronze medalist
- Søren Marinus Jensen – 1908 and 1912 Olympic bronze medalist
- Abraham Kurland – 1932 Olympic silver medalist
- Mark Madsen – 2016 Olympic silver medalist

== Egypt ==
- Mohamed Abdelfatah – 2006 World Champion in Greco-Roman
- Mohamed Ibrahim El-Sayed – 2020 Olympic bronze medalist
- Osman El-Sayed – 1960 Olympic silver medalist
- Karam Gaber – 2004 Olympic gold medalist, 2012 Olympic silver medalist
- Ibrahim Moustafa – 1928 Olympic gold medalist, Egypt's first Olympic Medal

== Estonia ==
- Aleksander Aberg – legitimate professional wrestling champion, namesake of a ship
- August Englas – 1953 World Champion Greco-Roman wrestling, 1954 World Champion Freestyle wrestling
- George Hackenschmidt – legitimate World Heavyweight Wrestling Champion, European Greco-Roman Heavyweight Champion
- Osvald Käpp – 1928 Olympic gold medalist Greco-Roman wrestling
- August Kippasto – 1912 Olympian
- Martin Klein – 1912 Olympic silver medalist
- Johannes Kotkas – 1952 Olympic gold medalist Greco-Roman, 1953 World Championships silver medalist Greco-Roman
- Albert Kusnets – 1928 Olympic bronze medalist Greco-Roman wrestling
- Georg Lurich – legitimate professional wrestling champion, record-setting strongman, namesake of a a memorial competition held since 1956 (et), trainer of Georg Hackenschmidt and Aleksander Aberg
- Heiki Nabi – 1996 World Champion Greco-Roman wrestling, 2012 Olympic silver medalist, 2013 World Championships silver medalist Greco-Roman
- August Neo – 1936 Olympic silver medalist in Freestyle and Bronze in Greco-Roman
- Kristjan Palusalu – 1936 Olympic gold medalist Greco-Roman, 1936 Olympic gold medalist Freestyle
- Eduard Pütsep – 1924 Olympic gold medalist Greco-Roman wrestling
- Roman Steinberg – 1924 Olympic bronze medalist Greco-Roman wrestling
- Voldemar Väli – 1928 Olympic gold medalist, 1932 Olympic bronze medalist

== France ==
- Edmond Dame – 1928 Olympic bronze medalist
- Henri Deglane – 1924 Olympic gold medalist
- Louis François – 1932 Olympic bronze medalist
- Anna Gomis – 2004 Olympic bronze medalist
- Christophe Guénot – 2008 Olympic bronze medalist
- Steeve Guénot – 2008 Olympic gold medalist, 2012 Olympic bronze medalist
- Charles Kouyos – 1948 Olympic bronze medalist
- Henri Lefèbvre – 1928 Olympic bronze medalist
- Lise Legrand – 2004 Olympic bronze medalist
- Charles Pacôme – 1932 Olympic gold medalist, 1928 Olympic silver medalist
- Émile Poilvé – 1936 Olympic gold medalist
- Daniel Robin – 1968 Olympic silver medalist in freestyle and Greco-Roman
- René Schiermeyer – 1960 Olympic bronze medalist
- Yannick Szczepaniak – 2008 Olympic bronze medalist
- Ghani Yalouz – 1996 Olympic silver medalist

== Finland ==
- Kalle Anttila – 1924 Olympic gold medalist
- Marko Asell – 1996 Olympic silver medalist
- Risto Björlin – 1972 Olympic bronze medalist
- Kelpo Gröndahl – 1952 Olympic gold medalist, 1948 Olympic silver medalist
- Väinö Kokkinen – 1928 and 1932 Olympic gold medalist
- Harri Koskela – 1988 Olympic silver medalist
- Kaarlo Koskelo – 1912 Olympic gold medalist
- Eino Leino – 1920 Olympic gold medalist, 1924 Olympic silver medalist, 1928 and 1932 Olympic bronze medalist
- Kustaa Pihlajamäki – 1924 and 1936 Olympic gold medalist, 1928 Olympic silver medalist
- Hermanni Pihlajamäki – 1932 Olympic gold medalist, 1936 Olympic bronze medalist
- Pertti Ukkola – 1976 Olympic gold medalist
- Yrjö Saarela – 1912 Olympic gold medalist, 1908 Olympic silver medalist
- Jouko Salomäki – 1984 Olympic gold medalist
- Tapio Sipilä – 1984 Olympic silver medalist and 1988 Olympic bronze medalist
- Emil Väre – 1912 and 1920 Olympic gold medalist
- Verner Weckman – 1908 Olympic gold medalist
- Marko Yli-Hannuksela – 2004 Olympic silver medalist, 2000 Olympic bronze medalist

== Georgia (Georgia (country)) ==
- Shmagi Bolkvadze – 2016 Olympic bronze medalist
- Akaki Chachua – 2000 Olympic bronze medalist
- Giorgi Gogshelidze – 2008 Olympic silver medalist, 2012 Olympic bronze medalist
- Iakobi Kajaia – 2020 Olympic silver medalist
- Vladimer Khinchegashvili – 2016 Olympic gold medalist, 2012 Olympic silver medalist
- Eldar Kurtanidze – 1996 and 2000 Olympic bronze medalist
- Manuchar Kvirkvelia – 2008 Olympic gold medalist
- Revaz Lashkhi – 2012 Olympic silver medalist
- Dato Marsagishvili – 2012 Olympic bronze medalist
- Givi Matcharashvili – 2024 Olympic silver medalist
- Revaz Mindorashvili – 2008 Olympic gold medalist
- Ramaz Nozadze – 2004 Olympic silver medalist
- Geno Petriashvili – 2024 Olympic gold medalist, 2020 Olympic silver medalist, 2016 Olympic bronze medalist
- Manuchar Tskhadaia – 2012 Olympic bronze medalist
- Otar Tushishvili – 2008 Olympic bronze medalist
- Mukhran Vakhtangadze – 2000 Olympic bronze medalist

== Germany ==
- Heiko Balz – 1992 Olympic silver medalist
- Jakob Brendel – 1932 Olympic gold medalist, 1936 Olympic bronze medalist
- Maik Bullmann – 1992 Olympic gold medalist, 1996 Olympic bronze medalist
- Wilfried Dietrich – 1960 Olympic gold medalist in freestyle, 1956 and 1960 Olympic silver medalist in Greco-Roman, 1964 Olympic bronze medalist in Greco-Roman, 1968 Olympic bronze medalist in Greco-Roman
- Wolfgang Ehrl – 1932 and 1936 Olympic silver medalist
- Mirko Englich – 2008 Olympic silver medalist
- Georg Gehring – 1928 Olympic bronze medalist
- Georg Gerstäcker – 1912 Olympic silver medalist
- Heinz Kiehl – 1964 Olympic bronze medalist
- Denis Kudla – 2016 and 2020 Olympic bronze medalist
- Alexander Leipold – originally awarded gold at the 2000 Olympics, but was stripped after testing positive for nandrolone, multi-time World medalist, 1994 World Champion
- Kurt Leucht – 1928 Olympic gold medalist
- Günther Maritschnigg – 1960 Olympic silver medalist
- Lothar Metz – 1968 Olympic gold medalist, 1960 Olympic silver medalist, 1964 Olympic bronze medalist
- Adolf Rieger – 1928 Olympic silver medalist
- Klaus Rost – 1964 Olympic silver medalist
- Aline Rotter-Focken – 2020 Olympic gold medalist
- Arawat Sabejew – 1996 Olympic bronze medalist
- Fritz Schäfer – 1936 Olympic silver medalist
- Carl Schuhmann – 1896 Olympic gold medalist
- Eduard Sperling – 1928 Olympic silver medalist, 1932 Olympic bronze medalist
- Frank Stäbler – 2020 Olympic bronze medalist, three-time World Champion
- Rıfat Yıldız – 1992 Olympic silver medalist
- Thomas Zander – 1996 Olympic silver medalist

== Great Britain (United Kingdom) ==
- Stanley Bacon – 1908 Olympic gold medalist
- Edward Barrett – 1908 Olympic bronze medalist
- Frederick Beck – 1908 Olympic bronze medalist
- Bernard Bernard – 1920 Olympic bronze medalist
- Arthur Gingell – 1908 Olympic bronze medalist
- Noel Loban – 1984 Olympic bronze medalist
- Archie MacDonald – 1924 Olympic bronze medalist
- William McKie – 1908 Olympic bronze medalist
- Con O'Kelly – 1908 Olympic gold medalist
- William J. Press – 1908 Olympic silver medalist
- Samuel Rabin – 1928 Olympic bronze medalist
- George de Relwyskow – 1908 Olympic gold and silver medalist
- Kenneth Richmond – 1952 Olympic bronze medalist
- John Slim – 1908 Olympic silver medalist
- William Wood – 1908 Olympic silver medalist
- Herbert Wright – 1920 Olympic bronze medalist

== Greece ==
- Stephanos Christopoulos – 1896 Olympic bronze medalist
- Charalambos Cholidis – 1984 and 1988 Olympic bronze medalist
- Petros Galaktopoulos – 1972 Olympic silver medalist and 1968 Olympic bronze medalist
- Georgios Hatziioannidis – 1980 Olympic bronze medalist
- Amiran Kardanov – 2000 Olympic bronze medalist
- Artiom Kiouregkian – 2004 Olympic bronze medalist
- Alexios Kolitsopoulos – 2001 Mediterranean Games silver medalist
- Stelios Mygiakis – 1980 Olympic gold medalist
- Dimitrios Thanopoulos – 1984 Olympic silver medalist
- Georgios Tsitas – 1896 Olympic silver medalist

== Hungary ==
- Sándor Bárdosi – 2000 Olympic silver medalist
- József Csatári – 1968 and 1972 Olympic bronze medalist
- Imre Hódos – 1952 Olympic gold medalist
- Garry Kallos – Hungarian-born Canadian wrestler and sambo competitor
- Ferenc Kocsis – 1980 Olympic gold medalist
- István Kozma – 1964 and 1968 Olympic gold medalist
- László Papp – 1928 Olympic silver medalist
- Ferenc Seres – 1980 Olympic bronze medalist
- Richárd Weisz – 1908 Olympic gold medalist
- Ödön Zombori – 1936 Olympic gold medalist, 1932 Olympic silver medalist

== India ==
- Ravi Kumar Dahiya – 2020 Olympic silver medalist
- Yogeshwar Dutt – 2012 Olympic bronze medalist
- Khashaba Jadhav – 1952 Olympic bronze medalist
- Sushil Kumar – 2012 Olympic silver medalist, 2008 Olympic bronze medalist & 2010 World Champion
- Sakshi Malik – 2016 Olympic bronze medalist
- Bajrang Punia – 2020 Olympic bronze medalist
- Aman Sehrawat – 2024 Olympic bronze medalist

== Iran ==
- Saeid Abdevali – 2016 Olympic bronze medalist
- Rahim Aliabadi – 1972 Olympic silver medalist
- Amirreza Khadem Azghadi – 1992, 1996 Olympic bronze medalists
- Rasul Khadem Azghadi – 1996 Olympic gold medalist, 1992 Silver Olympic Medalist
- Mansour Barzegar – 1976 Olympic silver medalist
- Alireza Dabir – 2000 Olympic gold medalist
- Komeil Ghasemi – 2012 Olympic gold medalist, 2016 Silver Olympic Medalist
- Nasser Givehchi – 1952 Olympic silver medalist
- Abutaleb Gorgori – 1968 Olympic bronze medalist
- Sadegh Goudarzi – 2012 Olympic silver medalist
- Emamali Habibi Goudarzi – 1956 Olympic gold medalist
- Alireza Heidari – 2004 Olympic bronze medalist
- Said Ali Akbar Heidari – 1964 Olympic bronze medalist
- Abbas Jadidi – 1996 Olympic silver medalist
- Ebrahim Javadi – 1972 Olympic bronze medalist
- Masoud Jokar – 2004 Olympic silver medalist
- Mohammad Ali Khojastépour – 1956 Olympic silver medalist
- Ehsan Lashgari – 2012 Olympic bronze medalist
- Fardin Masoumi – 2006 World bronze medalist, 2009 World silver medalist, Pahlevan of Iran
- Mansour Mehdizadeh – 1961, 1962, and 1965 World Champion, three-time Olympian, two-time Pahlevan of Iran
- Morad Mohammadi – 2008 Olympic bronze medalist
- Askari Mohammadian – 1988 Olympic silver medalist, 1992 Olympic silver medalist
- Abdullah Mojtabavi – 1952 Olympic bronze medalist
- Mahmoud Mollaghasemi – 1952 Olympic bronze medalist
- Abdollah Movahed – 1968 Olympic gold medalist
- Omid Norouzi – 2012 Olympic gold medalist
- Mohammad Paziraye – 1960 Olympic bronze medalist
- Hassan Rahimi – 2016 Olympic bronze medalist
- Alireza Rezaei – 2004 Olympic silver medalist
- Ghasem Rezaei – 2012 Olympic gold medalist, 2016 Olympic bronze medalist
- Mohammad Ali Sanatkaran – 1964 Olympic bronze medalist
- Mohammad Ebrahim Seifpour – 1960 Olympic bronze medalist
- Shamseddin Seyed-Abbasi – 1968 Olympic bronze medalist
- Alireza Soleimani – 1989 World Champion, six-time Pahlevan of Iran
- Reza Soukhtehsaraei – 1978 and 1981 World silver medalist, Pahlevan of Iran
- Hamid Sourian – 2012 Olympic gold medalist
- Gholamreza Takhti – 1956 Olympic gold medalist, 1952, 1960 Olympic silver medalists, three-time Pahlevan of Iran
- Jahanbakht Tofigh – 1952 Olympic bronze medalist
- Mohammad Mehdi Yaghoubi – 1956 Olympic silver medalist
- Hassan Yazdani – 2016 Olympic gold medalist, 2020 and 2024 Olympic silver medalist, three-time World Champion
- Abbas Zandi – 1954 World Champion, four-time Pahlevan of Iran

== Italy ==
- Giuseppe Bognanni – 1972 Olympic bronze medalist
- Adelmo Bulgarelli – 1956 Olympic bronze medalist
- Frank Chamizo – 2016 Olympic bronze medalist
- Abraham Conyedo – 2020 Olympic bronze medalist
- Ignazio Fabra – 1952 and 1956 Olympic silver medalist, 1955 World champion
- Guido Fantoni – 1948 Olympic bronze medalist
- Ercole Gallegati – 1932 and 1948 Olympic bronze medalist
- Giovanni Gozzi – 1932 Olympic gold medalist, 1928 Olympic bronze medalist
- Mario Gruppioni – 1932 Olympic bronze medalist
- Pietro Lombardi – 1948 Olympic gold medalist
- Vincenzo Maenza – 1984, 1988 Olympic gold medalist, 1992 Olympic silver medalist
- Andrea Minguzzi – 2008 Olympic gold medalist
- Marcello Nizzola – 1932 Olympic silver medalist
- Claudio Pollio – 1980 Olympic gold medalist
- Enrico Porro – 1908 Olympic gold medalist
- Gerolamo Quaglia – 1928 Olympic bronze medalist
- Gian Matteo Ranzi – 1972 Olympic bronze medalist

== Japan ==
- Sanshiro Abe – NCAA Division I national champion and 4-time NCAA All-American at Penn State University
- Jiichiro Date – 1976 Olympic gold medalist
- Kenichiro Fumita – 2024 Olympic gold medalist, 2020 Olympic silver medalist in Greco-Roman
- Kyoko Hamaguchi – 2004 Olympic bronze medalist
- Rei Higuchi – 2024 Olympic gold medalist, 2016 Olympic silver medalist
- Chiharu Icho – 2004 and 2008 Olympic silver medalist
- Kaori Icho – 2004, 2008, 2012 and 2016 Olympic gold medalist
- Kenji Inoue – 2004 Olympic bronze medalist
- Shohachi Ishii – 1952 Olympic gold medalist
- Yuka Kagami – 2024 Olympic gold medalist
- Masaaki Kaneko – 1968 Olympic gold medalist
- Shigeru Kasahara – 1956 Olympic silver medalist
- Yukako Kawai – 2020 Olympic gold medalist
- Yushu Kitano – 1952 Olympic silver medalist
- Ryūtarō Matsumoto – 2012 Olympic bronze medalist in Greco-Roman
- Tomohiro Matsunaga – 2008 Olympic silver medalist
- Katsutoshi Naito – 1924 Olympic bronze medalist, wrestled collegiately at Penn State University
- Hitomi Obara – 2012 Olympic gold medalist
- Tsugumi Sakurai – 2024 Olympic gold medalist
- Shozo Sasahara – 1956 Olympic gold medalist
- Mitsuru Sato – 1988 Olympic gold medalist
- Yui Susaki – 2020 Olympic gold medalist, 2024 Olympic silver medalist
- Chikara Tanabe – 2004 Olympic bronze medalist
- Hideaki Tomiyama – 1984 Olympic gold medalist
- Yojiro Uetake – 1964 and 1968 olympic gold medalist and 3-time undefeated NCAA Champion at Oklahoma State University
- Osamu Watanabe – 1964 Olympic gold medalist and freestyle wrestling's only Olympic gold medalist to retire undefeated in competition
- Shohei Yabiku – 2020 Olympic bronze medalist in Greco-Roman
- Hideaki Yanagida – 1972 Olympic gold medalist
- Sun Yanan – 2020 Olympic silver medalist, 2016 Olympic bronze medalist
- Saori Yoshida – 2004, 2008 and 2012 Olympic gold medalist, 2016 Olympic silver medalist
- Kenichi Yumoto – 2008 Olympic silver medalist

== Kazakhstan ==
- Islam Bayramukov – 2000 Olympic silver medalist
- Daniyal Gadzhiyev – 2012 Olympic bronze medalist
- Gennadiy Laliyev – 2004 Olympic silver medalist
- Yekaterina Larionova – 2016 Olympic bronze medalist
- Maulen Mamyrov – 1996 Olympic bronze medalist
- Mkhitar Manukyan – 2004 Olympic bronze medalist, two-time World Champion
- Guzel Manyurova – 2016 Olympic silver medalist, 2012 Olympic bronze medalist
- Yuriy Melnichenko – 1996 Olympic gold medalist, two-time World Champion
- Marid Mutalimov – 2008 Olympic bronze medalist
- Nurislam Sanayev – 2020 Olympic bronze medalist
- Daulet Shabanbay – 2012 Olympic bronze medalist
- Yelena Shalygina – 2008 Olympic bronze medalist
- Elmira Syzdykova – 2016 Olympic bronze medalist
- Akzhurek Tanatarov – 2012 Olympic bronze medalist
- Nurbakyt Tengizbayev – 2008 Olympic silver medalist
- Georgiy Tsurtsumia – 2004 Olympic silver medalist

== Korea, North (North Korea) ==
- Kim Gwong-hyong – 1972 Olympic bronze medalist
- Ri Hak-son – 1992 Olympic gold medalist
- Li Ho-pyong – 1980 Olympic silver medalist
- Choe Hyo-gyong – 2024 Olympic bronze medalist
- Kim Il – 1992 and 1996 Olympic gold medalist
- Yang Kyong-il – 2012 Olympic bronze medalist, two-time World champion
- Jang Se-hong – 1980 Olympic silver medalist
- Ri Se-ung – 2024 Olympic bronze medalist
- Kang Yong-gyun – 2000 Olympic bronze medalist
- Kim Yong-sik – 1992 Olympic bronze medalist
- Ri Yong-Sam – 1996 Olympic bronze medalist

== Korea, South (South Korea) ==
- Chang Chang-sun – 1964 Olympic silver medalist
- Bang Dae-du – 1984 Olympic bronze medalist
- Park Eun-chul – 2008 Olympic bronze medalist
- Moon Eui-jae – 2000 and 2004 Olympic silver medalist
- Kim Eui-kon – 1984 Olympic bronze medalist
- Son Gab-do – 1984 Olympic bronze medalist
- Jeon Hae-sup – 1976 Olympic bronze medalist
- An Han-bong – 1992 Olympic gold medalist
- Kim Hyeon-woo – 2012 Olympic gold medalist, 2016 Olympic bronze medalist
- Kim In-sub – 2000 Olympic silver medalist, two-time World Champion
- You In-tak – 1984 Olympic gold medalist
- Jang Jae-sung – 1996 Olympic silver medalist, 2000 Olympic bronze medalist
- Lee Jae-suk – 1988 Olympic bronze medalist
- Park Jang-soon – 1992 Olympic gold medalist, 1988 and 1996 Olympic silver medalist
- Jung Ji-hyun – 2004 Olympic gold medalist
- Kim Jong-kyu – 1984 Olympic silver medalist
- Kim Jong-shin – 1992 Olympic silver medalist, 1989 World Champion
- Lee Jung-keun – 1984 Olympic bronze medalist
- Yang Jung-Mo – 1976 Olympic gold medalist
- Sim Kwon-ho – 1996 and 2000 Olympic gold medalist, two-time World Champion
- Min Kyung-gab – 1992 Olympic bronze medalist
- Noh Kyung-sun – 1988 Olympic bronze medalist
- Kim Weon-kee – 1984 Olympic gold medalist
- Kim Young-nam – 1988 Olympic gold medalist

== Lebanon ==
- Hassan Bchara – 1980 Olympic bronze medalist
- Zakaria Chibab – 1952 Olympic silver medalist
- Khalil Taha – 1952 Olympic bronze medalist

== Moldova ==
- Sergei Mureiko – 1996 Olympic bronze medalist
- Anastasia Nichita – 2024 Olympic silver medalist

== Mongolia ==
- Tömöriin Artag – 1968 Olympic bronze medalist
- Soronzonboldyn Battsetseg – 2012 Olympic bronze medalist, 2-time world Champion
- Khorloogiin Bayanmönkh – 1972 Olympic silver medalist, 1975 world Champion
- Bat-Ochiryn Bolortuyaa – 2020 Olympic bronze medalist
- Chimedbazaryn Damdinsharav – 1968 Olympic bronze medalist
- Jamtsyn Davaajav – 1980 Olympic silver medalist
- Jigjidiin Mönkhbat – 1968 Olympic silver medalist
- Zevegiin Oidov – 1976 Olympic silver medalist, 2-time World Champion
- Dugarsürengiin Oyuunbold – 1980 Olympic bronze medalist
- Danzandarjaagiin Sereeter – 1968 Olympic bronze medalist

== North Macedonia ==
- Mogamed Ibragimov – 2000 Olympic bronze medalist

== Norway ==
- Stig-André Berge – 2016 Olympic bronze medalist
- Grace Bullen – 2024 Olympic bronze medalist
- Aage Eriksen – 1948 Olympic silver medalist
- Charles Ericksen – 1904 Olympic gold medalist
- Bernhoff Hansen – 1904 Olympic gold medalist
- Jon Rønningen – 1988 and 1992 Olympic gold medalist

== Pakistan ==
- Muhammad Bashir – 1960 Olympic bronze medalist

== Poland ==
- Jacek Fafiński – 1996 Olympic silver medalist
- Damian Janikowski – 2012 Olympic bronze medalist
- Kazimierz Lipień – 1976 Olympic gold medalist and 1972 Olympic bronze medalist
- Jozef Tracz – 1992 Olympic silver medalist, 1988 and 1996 Olympic bronze medalist
- Agnieszka Wieszczek – 2008 Olympic bronze medalist
- Ryszard Wolny – 1996 Olympic gold medalist
- Andrzej Wroński – 1988 and 1996 Olympic gold medalist
- Włodzimierz Zawadzki – 1996 Olympic gold medalist

== Romania ==
- Vasile Andrei – 1984 Olympic gold medalist and 1980 Olympic bronze medalist
- Petre Dicu – 1980 Olympic bronze medalist
- Ioan Grigoras – 1992 Olympic bronze medalist
- Nicolae Martinescu – 1972 Olympic gold medalist and 1968 Olympic bronze medalist
- Ilie Matei – 1984 Olympic silver medalist
- Albert Saritov – 2016 Olympic bronze medalist
- Gheorghiță Ștefan – 2008 Olympic bronze medalist

== Russia ==
- Islambek Albiev – 2008 Olympic gold medalist
- Khasan Baroyev – 2004 Olympic gold medalist, 2008 Olympic silver medalist
- Mavlet Batirov – 2004, 2008 Olympic gold medalist
- Vadim Bogiyev – 1996 Olympic gold medalist
- Alan Dudaev – 2005 World Champion
- Khadjimourat Gatsalov – 2004 Olympic gold medalist
- Murat Kardanov – 2000 Olympic gold medalist
- Alexander Karelin – FILA Greatest Wrestler of 20th Century (Greco-Roman), 1988, 1992, 1996 Olympic gold medalist, 2000 Olympic silver medalist, 9-time World Champion. He lost one match in 13 years to Rulon Gardner.
- Aslanbek Khushtov – 2008 Olympic gold medalist
- Khadzhimurad Magomedov – 1996 Olympic gold medalist
- Gouzel Maniourova – 2004 Olympic silver medalist
- Nazir Mankiev – 2008 Olympic gold medalist
- Alexei Michine – 2004 Olympic gold medalist
- Makhach Murtazaliev – 2004 Olympic bronze medalist
- Sagid Murtazaliev – 2000 Olympic gold medalist
- Shirvani Muradov – 2008 Olympic gold medalist
- David Musulbes – 2000 Olympic gold medalist
- Mourad Oumakhanov – 2000 Olympic gold medalist
- Valery Rezantsev – two-time Olympic gold medalist, 5-time World Champion
- Varteres Samourgachev – 2000 Olympic gold medalist, 2004 Olympic bronze medalist
- Adam Saitiev – 2000 Olympic gold medalist
- Buvaysa Saytiev – 1996, 2004, 2008 Olympic gold medalist and 5-time World Champion
- Sazhid Sazhidov – 2004 Olympic bronze medalist
- See USSR for all pre-1988 wrestlers in the Russian/USSR region

== Sweden ==
- Ara Abrahamian – 2004 Olympic silver medalist, later became known for his antics during 2008 Olympics where he was stripped of his bronze, two-time World champion
- Olle Anderberg – 1952 Olympic gold medalist and 1948 Olympic silver medalist
- Frank Andersson – 1984 Olympic bronze medalist
- Gösta Andersson – 1948 Olympic gold medalist, 1952 Olympic silver medalist
- Mauritz Andersson – 1908 Olympic silver medalist
- Axel Cadier – 1936 Olympic gold medalist, 1932 Olympic bronze medalist, four-time World Champion
- Johan Eurén – 2012 Olympic bronze medalist, 2013 World bronze medalist
- Jenny Fransson – 2016 Olympic bronze medalist, multi-time World medalist
- Knut Fridell – 1936 Olympic gold medalist
- Claes Johanson – 1912 and 1920 Olympic gold medalist
- Ivar Johansson – 1932 and 1936 Olympic gold medalist
- Jan Karlsson – 1972 Olympic silver and bronze medalist
- Anders Larsson – 1920 Olympic gold medalist
- Martin Lidberg – 2003 World gold medalist
- Jimmy Lidberg – 2012 Olympic bronze medalist
- Erik Lindén – 1948 Olympic bronze medalist
- Mikael Ljungberg – 2000 Olympic gold medalist and 1996 Olympic bronze medalist
- Frithiof Mårtensson – 1908 Olympic gold medalist
- Edvin Mattiasson – 1912 Olympic bronze medalist
- Sofia Mattsson – 2016 Olympic bronze medalist, multi-time World medalist
- Ida-Theres Karlsson-Nerell – multi-time World medalist
- Ernst Nilsson – 1920 Olympic bronze medalist, two-time World champion
- Karl-Erik Nilsson – 1948 Olympic gold medalist, 1952 and 1956 Olympic bronze medalist
- Viking Palm – 1952 Olympic gold medalist
- Kurt Pettersén – 1948 Olympic gold medalist
- Johan Richthoff – 1928 and 1932 Olympic gold medalist
- Thure Sjöstedt – 1928 Olympic gold medalist and 1932 Olympic silver medalist
- Rudolf Svensson – 1928 and 1932 Olympic gold medalist, 1924 Olympic silver medalist
- Carl Westergren – 1920, 1924 and 1932 Olympic gold medalist

== Switzerland ==
- Charles Courant – 1920 Olympic silver medalist and 1924 Olympic bronze medalist
- Hugo Dietsche – 1984 Olympic bronze medalist
- Hermann Gehri – 1924 Olympic gold medalist
- Fritz Hagmann – 1924 Olympic gold medalist
- Ernst Kyburz – 1928 Olympic gold medalist
- Adolf Müller – 1948 Olympic bronze medalist
- Otto Müller – 1924 Olympic bronze medalist
- Robert Roth – 1920 Olympic gold medalist
- Fritz Stöckli – 1948 Olympic silver medalist
- Gustav Tiefenthaler – 1904 Olympic bronze medalist
- Henri Wernli – 1924 Olympic silver medalist

== Turkey ==
- Nasuh Akar – 1948 Olympic gold medalist
- Ismet Atli – 1960 Olympic gold medalist
- Mithat Bayrak – 1956, 1960 Olympic gold medalists
- Adem Bereket – 2000 Olympic bronze medalist
- Ahmet Bilek – 1960 Olympic gold medalist
- Gazanfer Bilge – 1948 Olympic gold medalist
- Mustafa Dagistanli – 1956, 1960 Olympic gold medalists
- Yasar Dogu – 1948 Olympic gold medalist
- Yaşar Erkan – 1936 Olympic gold medalist
- Şeref Eroğlu – 2004 Olympic silver medalist
- Hasan Güngör – 1960 Olympic gold medalist, 1964 Olympic silver medalist
- Hamit Kaplan – 1956 Olympic gold medalist, 1960 Olympic silver medalist, 1964 Olympic bronze medalist
- Ahmet Kireççi – 1948 Olympic gold medalist, 1936 Olympic bronze medalist
- Tevfik Kis – 1960 Olympic gold medalist
- Ismail Ogan – 1960 Olympic silver medalist
- Mehmet Özal – 2004 Olympic bronze medalist
- Aydin Polatci – 2004 Olympic bronze medalist
- Müzahir Sille – 1960 Olympic gold medalist
- Hamza Yerlikaya – 1996, 2000 Olympic gold medalists

== USSR (Soviet Union) ==
- Zagalav Abdulbekov − 1972 Olympic gold medalist
- Arsen Alakhverdiyev − 1972 Olympic silver medalist
- Soslan Andiev – 1976 Olympic gold medalist, 1980 Olympic gold medalist
- Magomed Arasilov – 1980 Olympic silver medalist
- Ruslan Ashuraliyev – 1972 Olympic bronze medalist
- Nikolay Balboshin – 1976 Olympic gold medalist
- Vladimir Bakulin − 1968 Olympic silver medalist
- Anatoly Beloglazov – 1980 Olympic gold medalist
- Sergei Beloglazov – 1980, 1988 Olympic gold medalist, 6-time World Champion
- Anatoly Bykov – 1976 Olympic gold medalist, 1980 Olympic silver medalist
- Vladimir Cheboksarov – 1976 Olympic silver medalist
- Nelson Davidyan – 1976 Olympic silver medalist
- Roman Dmitriyev – 1972 Olympic gold medalist, 1976 Olympic silver medalist
- Boris Gurowitsch – 1968 Olympic gold medalist
- Aleksandr Ivanov – 1976 Olympic silver medalist
- Roustan Kasakov – 1972 Olympic gold medalist
- Makharbek Khadartsev – 1988, 1992 Olympic gold medalist, 1996 Olympic silver medalist
- Shamil Khisamutdinov – 1972 Olympic gold medalist
- Ivan Kochergin – 1968 Olympic bronze medalist
- Alexander Koltchinski – 1976 and 1980 Olympic gold medalist
- Vitali Konstantinov – 1976 Olympic gold medalist
- Alexander Medved – 1964, 1968, 1972 Olympic gold medalist, 7-time World champion, FILA Greatest Wrestler of 20th Century (Freestyle)
- Shota Lomidze – 1968 Olympic silver medalist
- Farhat Mustafin – 1976 Olympic bronze medalist
- Suren Nalbandyan – 1976 Olympic gold medalist
- Anatoly Nazarenko – 1972 Olympic silver medalist
- Viktor Novishilov – 1976 Olympic silver medalist
- Valentin Olenik – 1968 Olympic silver medalist
- Pavel Pinigin – 1976 Olympic gold medalist
- Anatoli Roschtchin – 1968 Olympic silver medalist, Olympic 1972 gold medalist
- Valeri Resanzev – 1972 and 1976 Olympic gold medalist
- Shazam Safin – 1952 Olympic gold medalist
- Aleksey Shumakov – 1976 Olympic gold medalist
- Gennady Strakhov – 1972 Olympic silver medalist
- Levan Tediashvili – 1972 and 1976 Olympic gold medalist
- Nikolai Yakovenko – 1968 and 1972 Olympic silver medalist
- Ivan Yarygin – 1972 and 1976 Olympic gold medalist
- Vladimir Yumin – 1976 Olympic gold medalist

== Uzbekistan ==
- Gulomjon Abdullaev – 2024 Olympic bronze medalist
- Magomed Ibragimov – 2004 Olympic silver medalist
- Bekzod Abdurakhmonov – 2020 Olympic bronze medalist
- Alexandr Dokturishvili – 2004 Olympic gold medalist
- Magomed Ibragimov – 2016 Olympic bronze medalist
- Ikhtiyor Navruzov – 2016 Olympic bronze medalist
- Elmurat Tasmuradov – 2016 Olympic bronze medalist
- Artur Taymazov – 2004, 2008 and 2012 Olympic gold medalist, 2000 Olympic silver medalist
- Razambek Zhamalov – 2024 Olympic gold medalist

== Ukraine ==
- Valeriy Andriytsev – 2012 Olympic silver medalist
- Zhan Beleniuk – 2020 Olympic gold medalist, 2016 Olympic silver medalist, 2024 Olympic bronze medalist, two-time World Champion
- Andriy Kalashnikov – 1996 Olympic bronze medalist
- Iryna Koliadenko – 2024 Olympic silver medalist, 2020 Olympic bronze medalist
- Iryna Merleni – 2004 Olympic gold medalist, 2008 Olympic bronze medalist, three-time World Champion
- Parviz Nasibov – 2020 and 2024 Olympic silver medalist
- Vyacheslav Oliynyk – 1996 Olympic gold medalist
- Davyd Saldadze – 2000 Olympic silver medalist
- Elbrus Tedeyev – 2004 Olympic gold medalist, 1996 Olympic bronze medalist, three-time World Champion
- Zaza Zazirov – 1996 Olympic bronze medalist

== United Arab Republic ==
- Osman Sayed – 1960 Olympic silver medalist

== USA (United States) ==
- Stephen Abas – 2004 Olympic silver medalist
- Kurt Angle – 1996 Olympic gold medalist, professional wrestling WWE Champion
- Edward Banach – 1984 Olympic gold medalist
- Louis Banach – 1984 Olympic gold medalist
- Bruce Baumgartner – 1984, 1992 Olympic gold medalist, 1988 Olympic silver medalist, 1996 Olympic bronze medalist, most Olympic and World medals by an American wrestler
- Donald Behm – 1968 Olympic silver medalist
- Peter Blair – 1956 Olympic bronze medalist
- Jeff Blatnick – 1984 Olympic gold medalist
- Douglas Blubaugh – 1960 Olympic gold medalist
- Daniel Brand – 1964 Olympic bronze medalist
- Glen Brand – 1948 Olympic gold medalist
- Terry Brands – 2000 Olympic bronze medalist, 2-time World Champion
- Tom Brands – 1996 Olympic gold medalist, 1993 World Champion
- Jordan Burroughs – 2012 Olympic gold medalist, 6-time World Champion
- Dremiel Byers – 2002 World Champion, 3-time World medalist
- Nate Carr – 1988 Olympic bronze medalist
- Henry Cejudo – 2008 Olympic gold medalist, simultaneous UFC Flyweight and Bantamweight Champion
- Mark Coleman – 1991 World silver medalist, NCAA Division I Champion, UFC Heavyweight Champion
- Daniel Cormier – six-time National Freestyle Champion, World bronze medalist, six-time Olympian, UFC Light Heavyweight and Heavyweight Champion
- Randy Couture – three-time Olympic alternate, two-time NCAA Division I runner-up, three-time UFC Heavyweight Champion and two-time Light Heavyweight Champion
- Robert Curry – 1904 Olympic gold medalist
- Kyle Dake – 4-time NCAA Division I Champion, only wrestler to win four NCAA titles in four different weight classes
- Barry Davis – 1984 Olympic silver medalist
- Lindsey Durlacher – 2006 World bronze medalist
- Stanley Dziedzic – 1976 Olympic bronze medalist
- Steve Fraser – 1984 Olympic gold medalist in Greco-Roman
- Dan Gable – 1972 Olympic gold medalist, 1971 World Champion, first wrestler in history to not have one point scored on him in the Olympics
- Rulon Gardner – 2000 Olympic gold medalist, 2004 Olympic bronze medalist
- Matt Ghaffari – 1996 Olympic silver medalist
- Greg Gibson – 1984 Olympic silver medalist
- Dennis Hall – 1996 Olympic silver medalist
- Dan Henderson – two-time Olympian, Pan American Champion, PRIDE Middleweight and Welterweight Champion
- Josiah Henson – 1952 Olympic bronze medalist
- Samuel Henson – 2000 Olympic silver medalist
- Danny Hodge – 1956 Olympic silver medalist, Dan Hodge Trophy namesake, professional wrestling NWA World Junior Heavyweight Champion
- Kevin Jackson – 1992 Olympic gold medalist
- Jamill Kelly – 2004 Olympics silver medalist
- Mark Kerr – NCAA Division I Champion, three-time ADCC World Champion, UFC 14 and UFC 15 tournament champion
- Brock Lesnar – NCAA Division I Champion, professional wrestling WWE Champion, UFC Heavyweight Champion
- Frank Lewis – 1936 Olympic gold medalist
- Matt James Lindland – 2000 Olympic silver medalist
- Zeke Jones – 1996 Olympic silver medalist
- Dennis Koslowski – 1992 Olympic silver medalist
- Garrett Lowney – 2000 Olympic bronze medalist
- Helen Maroulis – 2016 Olympic gold medalist, 2020 and 2024 Olympic bronze medalist
- Terrence McCann – 1960 Olympic gold medalist, founder of now USA Wrestling
- Sara McMann – 2004 Olympic silver medalist
- Lincoln McIlravy – 2000 Olympic bronze medalist
- George Mehnert – 1904 and 1908 Olympic gold medalist
- Leland Merrill – 1948 Olympic bronze medalist
- Francis Millard – 1936 Olympic silver medalist
- Patricia Miranda – 2004 Olympic bronze medalist
- Kenny Monday – 1988 Olympic gold medalist, 1992 Olympic silver medalist
- Chester Newton – 1924 Olympic silver medalist
- Ike Okoli – 2014 World bronze medalist and 2015 Pan-Am gold medalist in beach wrestling
- Brandon Paulson – 1996 Olympic silver medalist
- Ben Peterson – 1972 Olympic gold medalist, 1976 Olympic silver medalist
- John Peterson – 1972 Olympic silver medalist, 1976 Olympic gold medalist
- Kevin Randleman – two-time NCAA Division I Champion, UFC Heavyweight Champion
- Robin Reed – 1924 Olympic gold medalist, undefeated, pinned every opponent in Olympic competition
- Andrew Rein – 1984 Olympic silver medalist
- Anthony Robles – NCAA Division I Champion in 2011 despite being born with only one leg
- Richard Sanders – 1968, 1972 Olympic silver medalist
- Townsend Saunders – 1996 Olympic silver medalist
- Cael Sanderson – 2004 Olympic gold medalist, 4-time undefeated NCAA Division I Champion
- Bill Scherr – 1988 Olympic bronze medalist
- Dave Schultz – 1984 Olympic gold medalist, 1983 World Champion
- Mark Schultz – 1984 Olympic gold medalist, two-time World Champion
- Dan Severn – 1986 World Cup champion, Olympic alternate, UFC 5 and Ultimate Ultimate 1995 tournament champion, UFC Superfight champion, professional wrestling NWA Worlds Heavyweight Championship
- Brandon Slay – 2000 Olympic gold medalist
- John Smith – 1988 and 1992 Olympic gold medalist, 4-time World Champion
- Pat Smith – younger brother of John Smith; first wrestler to win four NCAA Division I titles
- William Smith – 1952 Olympic gold medalist
- Kyle Snyder – 2016 Olympic gold medalist, 2020 Olympic silver medalist, three-time World Champion, three-time NCAA Division I Champion
- Logan Stieber – 4-time NCAA Division I Champion, 2016 World Champion
- Chris Taylor – 1972 Olympic bronze medalist
- Jake Varner – 2012 Olympic gold medalist
- Richard Voliva – 1936 Olympic silver medalist
- Joe Warren – 2006 World Champion
- Robert Weaver – 1984 Olympics gold medalist
- Shelby Wilson – 1960 Olympic gold medalist
- Henry Wittenberg – 1948 Olympic gold medalist, 1952 Olympic silver medalist

== Yugoslavia (Socialist Federal Republic of Yugoslavia) ==
- Josip Čorak – 1972 Olympic silver medalist
- Ivan Frgić – 1976 Olympic silver medalist
- Stevan Horvat – 1968 Olympic silver medalist
- Vlado Lisjak – 1984 Olympic gold medalist
- Branislav Martinović – 1960 Olympic silver and 1964 bronze medalist
- Refik Memišević – 1984 Olympic silver medalist
- Milan Nenadić – 1972 Olympic bronze medalist
- Momir Petković – 1976 Olympic gold medalist
- Šaban Sejdiu – 1980 and 1984 Olympic bronze medalist
- Branislav Simić – 1964 Olympic gold and 1968 bronze medalist
- Jožef Tertei – 1984 Olympic bronze medalist
- Šaban Trstena – 1984 Olympic gold and 1988 silver medalist
