= Wrestling at the 1908 Summer Olympics =

Coordinates: 51.5136°N 0.2274°E

Wrestling at the Games of the IV Olympiad
- Venue: White City Stadium
- Dates: 20–25 July 1908
- No. of events: 9 (9 men, 0 women)
- Competitors: 115 from 14 nations

At the 1908 Summer Olympics in London, nine wrestling events were contested, all for men. There were four weight classes in Greco-Roman wrestling and five weight classes in freestyle wrestling.

Greco-Roman reappeared for the first time since the 1896 Summer Olympics, with weight classes for the first time. The number of classes in freestyle was reduced from 7 to 5, with the light fly, fly, and welterweight classes dropped but the middleweight added. The addition of the 4 Greco-Roman classes brought the total number of events in wrestling up to 9.

== Medal summary ==
=== Freestyle ===
Games	Gold	Silver	Bronze
Bantamweight	George Mehnert; United States	William J. Press; Great Britain	Aubert Côté; Canada
Featherweight	George Dole; United States	James Slim; Great Britain	William McKie; Great Britain
Lightweight	George de Relwyskow; Great Britain	William Wood; Great Britain	Albert Gingell; Great Britain
Middleweight	Stanley Bacon; Great Britain	George de Relwyskow; Great Britain	Frederick Beck; Great Britain
Heavyweight	Con O'Kelly; Great Britain	Jacob Gundersen; Norway	Edward Barrett; Great Britain

=== Greco-Roman ===
Games	Gold	Silver	Bronze
Lightweight	Enrico Porro; Italy	Nikolay Orlov; Russian Empire	Arvo Lindén; Finland
Middleweight	Frithiof Mårtensson; Sweden	Mauritz Andersson; Sweden	Anders Andersen; Denmark
Light heavyweight	Verner Weckman; Finland	Yrjö Saarela; Finland	Carl Jensen; Denmark
Heavyweight	Richárd Weisz; Hungary	Aleksandr Petrov; Russian Empire	Søren Marinus Jensen; Denmark

== Participating nations ==
115 wrestlers from 14 nations competed.

- Belgium (4)
- Bohemia (4)
- Canada (1)
- Denmark (11)
- Finland (4)
- Germany (1)
- Great Britain (53)

- Hungary (7)
- Italy (1)
- Netherlands (9)
- Norway (1)
- Russian Empire (4)
- Sweden (9)
- United States (6)

== Medal table ==
Rank	Nation	Gold	Silver	Bronze	Total
1	Great Britain	3	4	4	11
2	United States	2	0	0	2
3	Finland	1	1	1	3
4	Sweden	1	1	0	2
5	Hungary	1	0	0	1
5	Italy	1	0	0	1
7	Russian Empire	0	2	0	2
8	Norway	0	1	0	1
9	Denmark	0	0	3	3
10	Canada	0	0	1	1
Totals (10 entries)		9	9	9	27

Belgium, Bohemia, Germany, and the Netherlands also sent wrestlers, but did not win any medals.

== See also ==
- List of World and Olympic Champions in men's freestyle wrestling
- List of World and Olympic Champions in Greco-Roman wrestling

== Sources ==
- Cook, Theodore Andrea (1908). The Fourth Olympiad, Being the Official Report. London: British Olympic Association.
- De Wael, Herman (2001). "Freestyle Wrestling 1908". Herman's Full Olympians.
