= Russian Empire at the 1908 Summer Olympics =

- Flag of the Russian Empire
- IOC code: RU1

in London
- Competitors: 6 in 3 sports
- Medals Ranked 12th: Gold 1 Silver 2 Bronze 0 Total 3

Summer Olympics appearances (overview)
- 1900; 1904; 1908; 1912

Other related appearances
- Soviet Union (1952–1988); Unified Team (1992); Russia (1994–2016); ROC (2020); Individual Neutral Athletes (2024)

The Russian Empire (Russia) competed at the 1908 Summer Olympics in London, England. It was the second appearance of the European nation, after having missed the 1904 Games.

== Late arrival of the shooting team ==
Some sources claim that the Russian shooting team was 13 days late to the Olympics due to the Russian Empire still using the Julian calendar as opposed to the rest of Europe, which used the Gregorian system. Other authors doubt this claim, and point out that Russia had been living next to Gregorian-calendar Europe for two centuries and was used to the difference. The official report does not mention Russia, despite mentioning Italy and Australia as "absent".

== Medalists ==
Medal	Name	Sport	Event	Date
Gold	Nikolai Panin	Figure skating	Men's special figures	October 29
Silver	Nikolay Orlov	Wrestling	Men's Greco-Roman lightweight	July 25
Silver	Aleksandr Petrov	Wrestling	Men's Greco-Roman super heavyweight	July 24

== Results by event ==
=== Athletics ===
Russia had one track & field athlete compete in 1908. Lind took 19th place of 27 finishers in the marathon.

Event	Place	Athlete	Heats	Semifinals	Final
Men's marathon	19th	Georg Lind	None held		3:26:38.8

=== Figure skating ===
Event	Place	Skater	Score
Men's individual	—	Nikolai Panin	Did not finish
Men's special figures	1st	Nikolai Panin	43.8

=== Wrestling ===
Event	Place	Wrestler	Round of 32	Round of 16	Quarter- finals	Semi- finals	Final
Greco-Roman lightweight	2nd	Nikolay Orlov	Bye	Defeated; Lund	Defeated; Radvány	Defeated; Lindén	Lost to Porro
Greco-Roman middleweight	9th	Georgy Demin	Bye	Lost to Frank	Did not advance		
Greco-Roman light heavyweight	9th	Yevgeny Zamotin	Bye	Lost to Payr	Did not advance		
Greco-Roman heavyweight	2nd	Aleksandr Petrov	None held		Defeated; Humphreys	Defeated; Payr	Lost to Weisz

Opponent nation	Wins	Losses	Percent
Finland	1	0	1.000
Great Britain	1	0	1.000
Hungary	2	2	.500
Italy	0	1	.000
Sweden	1	1	.500
Total	5	4	.556

== Sources ==
- Cook, Theodore Andrea (1908). The Fourth Olympiad, Being the Official Report. London: British Olympic Association.
- De Wael, Herman (2001). "Top London 1908 Olympians". Herman's Full Olympians. Archived from the original on 12 July 2006.
