= Hungarian Wrestling Federation =

Sports governing body in Hungary

- Abbreviation: MBSZ
- Formation: 16 March 1921
- Type: Sports federation
- Headquarters: Budapest, Hungary
- President: Szilárd Németh
- Affiliations: United World Wrestling (UWW)
- Website: www.birkozoszov.hu

Hungarian Wrestling Federation (Hungarian: Magyar Birkózó Szövetség, pronounced [ˈmɒɟɒr ˈbirkoːzoː ˈsøvɛt͡ʃːeːɡ], MBSZ) is the governing body for wrestling in Hungary. It aims to govern, encourage and develop the sport for all throughout the country.

TGF has been established on 16 March 1921, and is headquartered in Budapest. TGF is a member of United World Wrestling (UWW), formerly known as the International Federation of Associated Wrestling Styles (FILA).

The federation organizes the national wrestling events, and European and World championships hosted by Hungary.

== International competitions in Hungary ==
World Championships:

- 1958 World Wrestling Championships (Greco-Roman) – Budapest
- 1985 World Wrestling Championships (Freestyle) – Budapest
- 1986 World Wrestling Championships (Freestyle) – Budapest
- 1986 World Wrestling Championships (Greco-Roman) – Budapest
- 2005 World Wrestling Championships – Budapest
- 2013 World Wrestling Championships – Budapest
- 2016 World Wrestling Championships – Budapest
- 2018 World Wrestling Championships – Budapest

European Championships:

- 1911 European Wrestling Championships – Budapest
- 1927 European Wrestling Championships – Budapest
- 1931 European Wrestling Championships (Freestyle) – Budapest
- 1983 European Wrestling Championships – Budapest
- 1992 European Wrestling Championships (Freestyle) – Kaposvár
- 1996 European Wrestling Championships – Budapest
- 2000 European Wrestling Championships (Freestyle) – Budapest
- 2001 European Wrestling Championships (Freestyle) – Budapest

== International achievements ==
Event	Gold medal	Silver medal	Bronze medal	Pos.
Olympic Games	19	16	19	8th
World Championships	7	11	8	10th
European Championships	12			

=== Olympic Games ===
Accurate as of the conclusion of the 2020 Olympic Games.

Games	Athletes	Gold	Silver	Bronze	Total	Rank
1896 Athens	1	0	0	0	0	–
1900 Paris	no competitors					
1904 St. Louis	no competitors					
1908 London	7	1	0	0	1	5
1912 Stockholm	10	0	0	1	1	5
1920 Antwerp	did not participate					
1924 Paris	12	0	1	1	2	7
1928 Amsterdam	6	1	1	0	2	6
1932 Los Angeles	5	0	2	1	3	7
1936 Berlin	12	3	0	1	4	2
1948 London	12	1	1	2	4	4
1952 Helsinki	12	2	1	1	4	3
1956 Melbourne	8	0	1	1	2	8
1960 Rome	10	0	1	0	1	8
1964 Tokyo	10	2	0	0	2	5
1968 Mexico City	13	2	0	2	4	4
1972 Munich	18	1	0	4	5	6
1976 Montreal	18	0	1	1	2	10
1980 Moscow	19	2	3	2	7	3
1984 Los Angeles	did not participate					
1988 Seoul	18	1	1	0	2	7
1992 Barcelona	17	2	0	0	2	6
1996 Atlanta	11	0	0	0	0	–
2000 Sydney	8	0	1	0	1	12
2004 Athens	9	1	0	0	1	8
2008 Beijing	9	0	1	0	1	17
2012 London	7	0	1	2	3	9
2016 Rio de Janeiro	8	0	0	0	0	–
2020 Tokyo	6	1	1	0	2	?
Total		20	17	19	56	8

== Notable wrestlers ==
=== Greco-Roman ===
- Richárd Weisz (1879–1945), Olympic champion
- Márton Károly ( – ), European champion
- Mihály Grozescu ( – ), European champion
- Ödön Radvány (1888–1959), World champion
- Armand Magyar (1888–1961), European champion
- Jenő Németh (born 1902), European champion
- Lajos Keresztes (1900–1978), European and Olympic champion
- László Papp (1905–1989), European champion
- Rajmund Badó (1902–1986), European champion
- Márton Lőrincz (1911–1969), Olympic champion
- József Gál ( – ), World champion
- Imre Hódos (1928–1989), Olympic champion
- Miklós Szilvásy (1925–1969), Olympic champion
- Imre Polyák (1932–2010), 3x World and Olympic champion
- György Gurics (1929–2013), World champion
- István Kozma (1939–1970), 3x World, 2x Olympic and European champion
- János Varga (born 1939), 2x World, 2x European and Olympic champion
- Ferenc Kiss (1942–2015), 2x European champion
- László Sillai ( – ), World champion
- Dr. Csaba Hegedűs (born 1948), World, Olympic and 2x European champion
- János Rovnyai ( ), European champion
- László Réczi (born 1947), World champion
- Lajos Rácz (born 1952), 2x European and World champion
- Ferenc Kocsis (born 1953), 4x European, World and Olympic champion
- István Tóth (born 1951), 2x World champion
- István Kovács (born 1950), World champion
- Norbert Növényi (born 1957), Olympic champion
- Tamás Gáspár (born 1960), European and World champion
- Tibor Komáromi (born 1964), European and 3x World champion
- Árpád Sípos ( ), European champion
- Jenő Bódi ( ), European champion
- Attila Repka (born 1968), 4x European and Olympic champion
- András Sike (born 1965), Olympic champion
- József Faragó ( ), European champion
- Péter Farkas (born 1968), 2x World, European and Olympic champion
- István Majoros (born 1974), European and Olympic champion
- Mihály Deák-Bárdos (born 1975), European champion
- Tamás Lőrincz (born 1986), 3x European champion
- Péter Bácsi (born 1983), 2x European and World champion
- Balázs Kiss (born 1983), World champion

=== Freestyle ===
Men's

- József Tunyogi (1907–1980), European champion
- Ödön Zombori (1906–1989), European and Olympic champion
- Károly Kárpáti (1906–1996), Olympic champion
- Gyula Bóbis (1909–1972), Olympic champion

Women's

- Marianna Sastin (born 1983), World champion
