= Wrestling at the 1908 Summer Olympics – Men's Greco-Roman heavyweight =

Men's heavyweight Greco-Roman wrestling at the Games of the IV Olympiad
- Venue: White City Stadium
- Dates: July 21 (quarterfinals, semifinals); July 24 (final, bronze match)
- Competitors: 7 from 4 nations

Medalists
1st place, gold medalist(s)		Richárd Weisz	Hungary
2nd place, silver medalist(s)		Aleksandr Petrov	Russian Empire
3rd place, bronze medalist(s)		Søren Marinus Jensen	Denmark

The Greco-Roman heavyweight was one of four Greco-Roman wrestling weight classes contested on the Wrestling at the 1908 Summer Olympics programme. Like all other wrestling events, it was open only to men. The heavyweight was the heaviest weight class, allowing wrestlers over 93 kilograms (205 lb). Each nation could enter up to 12 wrestlers.

== Competition format ==
The event was a single-elimination tournament with a bronze medal match between the semifinal losers. The final and bronze medal match were best two-of-three, while all other rounds were a single bout. Bouts were 15 minutes, unless one wrestler lost by fall (two shoulders on the ground at the same time). Other than falls, decisions were made by the judges or, if they did not agree, the referee.

Wrestlers could "take hold only from the head and not lower than the waist." The "hair, flesh, ears, private parts, or clothes may not be seized"; striking, scratching, twisting fingers, tripping, and grabbing legs were prohibited. Holds "obtained that the fear of breakage or dislocation of a limb shall cause the wrestler to give the fall" were outlawed, and particularly the double-nelson, arm up back with bar on, hammerlock, strangle, half-strangle, hang, and flying mare with palm uppermost.

== Resulters ==
=== Places ===
Place	Wrestler	Nation
1	Richárd Weisz	Hungary
2	Aleksandr Petrov	Russia
3	Søren Marinus Jensen	Denmark
4	Hugó Payr	Hungary
5	Edward Barrett	Great Britain
5	Frederick Humphreys	Great Britain
5	Carl Jensen	Denmark

=== Bracket ===
First Round
Decision
Aleksandr Petrov (RU1)
Frederick Humphreys (GBR)
Fall (4:37)
Hugó Payr (HUN)
Edward Barrett (GBR)
Fall (13:08)
Richárd Weisz (HUN)
Carl Jensen (DEN)

Semi-finals
Fall (15:12)
Aleksandr Petrov (RU1)
Hugó Payr (HUN)
Decision
Richárd Weisz (HUN)
Søren Jensen (DEN)

Final
2–0 (Decision/decision)
Aleksandr Petrov (RU1) (silver)
Richárd Weisz (HUN) (gold)
Third place
1–0 (Fall (5:44/retired)
Søren Jensen (DEN) (bronze)
Hugó Payr (HUN)

== Sources ==
- Cook, Theodore Andrea (1908). The Fourth Olympiad, Being the Official Report. London: British Olympic Association.
- De Wael, Herman (2001). "Greco-Roman Wrestling 1908". Herman's Full Olympians. Archived from the original on 1 March 2005.
