= Wrestling at the 1908 Summer Olympics – Men's Greco-Roman light heavyweight =

Men's light heavyweight Greco-Roman wrestling at the Games of the IV Olympiad
- Venue: White City Stadium
- Date: July 22
- Competitors: 21 from 10 nations

Medalists
1st place, gold medalist(s)		Verner Weckman	Finland
2nd place, silver medalist(s)		Yrjö Saarela	Finland
3rd place, bronze medalist(s)		Carl Jensen	Denmark

The Greco-Roman light heavyweight was one of four Greco-Roman wrestling weight classes contested on the Wrestling at the 1908 Summer Olympics programme. Like all other wrestling events, it was open only to men. The light heavyweight was the second-heaviest weight class, allowing wrestlers up to 93 kilograms (205 lb). Each nation could enter up to 12 wrestlers.

== Competition format ==
The event was a single-elimination tournament with a bronze medal match between the semifinal losers. The final and bronze medal match were best two-of-three, while all other rounds were a single bout. Bouts were 15 minutes, unless one wrestler lost by fall (two shoulders on the ground at the same time). Other than falls, decisions were made by the judges or, if they did not agree, the referee.

Wrestlers could "take hold only from the head and not lower than the waist." The "hair, flesh, ears, private parts, or clothes may not be seized"; striking, scratching, twisting fingers, tripping, and grabbing legs were prohibited. Holds "obtained that the fear of breakage or dislocation of a limb shall cause the wrestler to give the fall" were outlawed, and particularly the double-nelson, arm up back with bar on, hammerlock, strangle, half-strangle, hang, and flying mare with palm uppermost.

== Results ==
=== Standings ===
Place	Wrestler	Nation
1	Verner Weckman	Finland
2	Yrjö Saarela	Finland
3	Carl Jensen	Denmark
4	Hugó Payr	Hungary
5	Alfred Banbrook	Great Britain
5	Marcel Dubois	Belgium
5	Fritz Larsson	Sweden
5	Jacob van Westrop	Netherlands
9	Cyril Brown	Great Britain
9	Jussi Kivimäki	Finland
9	August Meesen	Belgium
9	Ernest Nixson	Great Britain
9	Leendert van Oosten	Netherlands
9	William West	Great Britain
9	Douwe Wijbrands	Netherlands
9	Yevgeny Zamotin	Russia
17	Harald Christiansen	Denmark
17	Henry Foskett	Great Britain
17	György Luntzer	Hungary
17	Henri Nielsen	Denmark
17	Miroslav Šustera	Bohemia

=== Bracket ===
First Round
Decision
Fritz Larsson (SWE)
Harald Christiansen (DEN)
Fall (5:33)
Douwe Wijbrands (NED)
György Luntzer (HUN)
Fall (7:29)
Walter West (GBR)
Miroslav Šustera (BOH)
Fall (3:50)
Yrjö Saarela (FIN)
Henri Nielsen (DEN)
Fall (1:30)
Marcel Dubois (BEL)
Henry Foskett (GBR)

Second Round
Decision
Fritz Larsson (SWE)
Douwe Wijbrands (NED)
Fall (1:53)
Walter West (GBR)
Verner Weckman (FIN)
Fall (9:08)
Hugó Payr (HUN)
Yevgeny Zamotin (RU1)
Decision
Jacob van Westrop (NED)
Jussi Kivimäki (FIN)
Fall (2:31)
Yrjö Saarela (FIN)
Ernest Nixson (GBR)
Fall (1:35)
Marcel Dubois (BEL)
Cyril Brown (GBR)
Fall (8:41)
Carl Jensen (DEN)
Leendert van Oosten (NED)
Fall (7:11)
Alfred Banbrook (GBR)
August Meesen (BEL)

Quarter-finals
Fall (4:10)
Fritz Larsson (SWE)
Verner Weckman (FIN)
Decision
Hugó Payr (HUN)
Jacob van Westrop (NED)
Fall (12:24)
Yrjö Saarela (FIN)
Marcel Dubois (BEL)
Fall (2:28)
Carl Jensen (DEN)
Alfred Banbrook (GBR)

Semi-finals
Fall (11:36)
Verner Weckman (FIN)
Hugó Payr (HUN)
Fall (5:35)
Yrjö Saarela (FIN)
Carl Jensen (DEN)

Final
2–1 (fall by 4:22/fall (5:07)/fall (16:10))
Verner Weckman (FIN) (gold)
Yrjö Saarela (FIN) (silver)
Third place
2–0 (falls 2:04/1:40)
Carl Jensen (DEN) (bronze)
Hugó Payr (HUN)

== Sources ==
- Cook, Theodore Andrea (1908). The Fourth Olympiad, Being the Official Report. London: British Olympic Association.
- De Wael, Herman (2001). "Greco-Roman Wrestling 1908". Herman's Full Olympians. Archived from the original on 1 March 2005.
