= Verner Weckman =

Finnish wrestler (1882–1968)

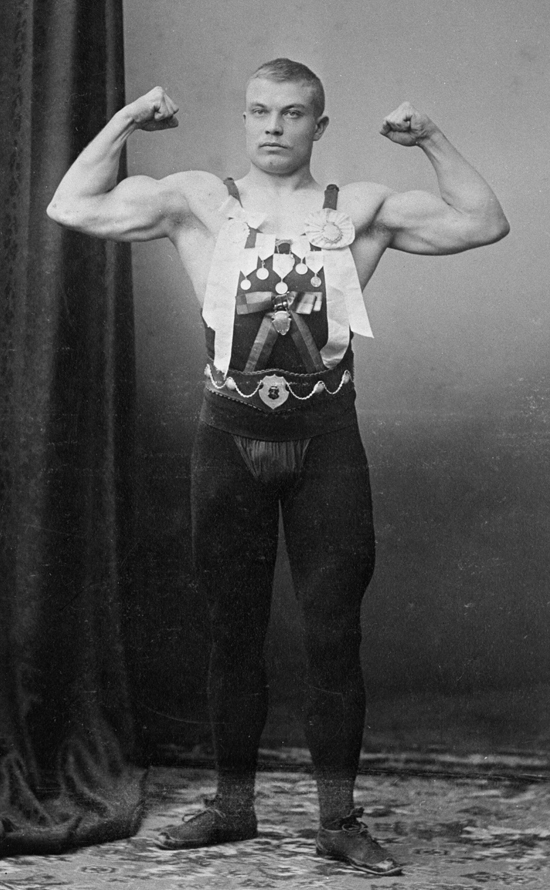
- Weckman, c. early 1900’s

Personal information
- Full name: Johan Verner Weckman
- National team: Finland
- Born: 26 July 1882 Loviisa, Grand Duchy of Finland, Russian Empire
- Died: 22 February 1968 (aged 85) Helsinki, Finland
- Resting place: Hietaniemi Cemetery, Helsinki
- Monuments: Memorial relief in Loviisa, by Matti Haupt, 1963
- Education: Master of Science in Engineering, Mechanical (1907) and electrical (1908) engineering, Karlsruhe Institute of Technology
- Occupations: Plant manager, chief executive officer, technical director
- Height: 178 cm (5 ft 10 in)
- Weight: 85–90 kg (187–198 lb)
- Spouses: Ingrid Suoma Regina Svedberg (1910–1947); Dagmar Maria Falin (Lund) (1948–)

Sport
- Sport: Greco-Roman wrestling
- Club: Helsingfors Gymnastikklubben (1902–1903); Helsingin Atleettiklubi (1903–1904); Germania Karlsruhe
Medal record
Men's Greco-Roman wrestling
Representing (Russia) Finland
Olympic Games
Gold medal – first place	1908 London	Light heavyweight
Intercalated Games
Gold medal – first place	1906 Athens	Middleweight
Silver medal – second place	1906 Athens	All-around
World Championships
Gold medal – first place	1905 Duisburg (unofficial)	Heavyweight

Johan Verner Weckman (26 July 1882 – 22 February 1968) was a wrestler who was the first Finnish Olympic gold medalist.

== Wrestling ==
He was inspired to take up wrestling at the age of 15. He joined the club Helsingfors Gymnastikklubben in 1902, then moved to Helsingin Atleettiklubi in 1903. He won the Finnish national Greco-Roman heavyweight championship in 1904. Then he moved to Germany, where he joined the club Germania Karlsruhe.

He won the unofficial Greco-Roman heavyweight world title in Duisburg in 1905.

Weckman was the initiating force behind Finland sending a team to the 1906 Intercalated Games. He was pressured by the German Imperial Committee for Olympic Games to change citizenship and join the German team, but Weckman insisted on representing Finland. He found a private financial supporter and four Finnish competitors travelled to Athens. He won gold in his class:

Verner Weckman in Greco-Roman wrestling at the 1906 Intercalated Games
Event	Round	Opponent	Result
Middleweight	First round	Paul Boghaert (FRA)	Win
Middleweight	Quarter-finals	Sauveur (BEL)	Win
Middleweight	Semi-finals	Rudolf Lindmayer (AUT)	Win
Middleweight	Final	Robert Behrens (DEN)	Win (gold)
All-around	First bout	Bye	
All-around	Second bout	Søren Marinus Jensen (DEN)	Loss (silver)

The all-around event was exclusively for class-winners, and no physical medals were awarded for the three participants.

He was nominated into the 1908 Finnish Olympic team without trials.

Verner Weckman at the 1908 Summer Olympics Greco-Roman light heavyweight
Round	Opponent	Result
First round	Bye	
Second round	William West (GBR)	Win by fall at 1:53
Quarter-finals	Fritz Larsson (SWE)	Win by fall at 4:10
Semi-finals	Hugó Payr (HUN)	Win by fall at 5:35
Final (best out of three)	Yrjö Saarela (FIN)	Loss by fall at 4:22
Final (best out of three)	Yrjö Saarela (FIN)	Win by fall at 5:07
Final (best out of three)	Yrjö Saarela (FIN)	Win by fall at 16:10 (gold)

According to rumours, Weckman bribed Saarela to throw the final. Modern sportswriters Arto Teronen and Jouko Vuolle consider there to be plenty of circumstantial evidence in favour.

He retired from wrestling after the 1908 games.

Weckman is the first Finn to win an Olympic gold, both including and excluding the Intercalated Games, and the first Finnish wrestler to win a world championship, although unofficially. Weckman also joked that he was the first Russian Olympic winner, when he met with Soviets during negotiations for the Finnish war reparations to the Soviet Union.

He donated his gold medals to the Sports Museum of Finland.

== Business career ==
He completed his matriculation exam at the Helsinki Swedish Real Lyceum in 1902. Then he studied at the Helsinki Polytechnical Institute. He moved abroad in 1904 to avoid conscription. He studied briefly in ETH Zurich and then moved to Karlsruhe Institute of Technology.

Weckman graduated as a Master of Science in mechanical engineering in 1907 and electrical engineering in 1908. He briefly served in Westinghouse Electric Corporation in France in 1909 and then worked as a technical director in asbestos mining in the Ural Mountains until 1921. Then he returned to Finland, where he worked at the Kaapelitehdas, first as a technical director in 1921–1937, then its chief executive officer in 1937–1955. He remained on the company board after retirement.

He was a deputy board member of The Finnish Employers' Confederation in 1942–1947 and board member in metal industry and engineering associations.

== Accolades ==
He is an honorary chairman of Helsingin Atleettiklubi.

He was awarded the honorary title vuorineuvos in 1953.

He received the following honorary awards:

- Order of the Cross of Liberty, 2nd and 3rd class
- Commander, First Class, of the Order of the Lion of Finland
- Commemorative Medal of the Winter War
- The medal for protesters against Russian military draft 1905–1906
- Cross of Merit, in gold, of the Finnish Sports

There is a memorial dedicated to him in his birth town, Loviisa. Made by Matti Haupt in 1963, Olympic rings were added to it in 2010.

Talouselämä magazine listed Weckman among the 100 most significant business executives of Finland's history in 2012.

== Family ==
His parents were farm owner Anders Weckman and Fredrika Johansson.

His first marriage was to Ingrid Suoma Regina Svedberg (1889–1947) in 1910. They had two children:

1. Gunnel Ingrid Emilia (1914–)
2. Per Verner Anders (1916–)

He became a widow in 1947 and married Dagmar Maria Falin (former Lund) (1894–) in 1948.
