= Jussi Kivimäki =

Finnish wrestler

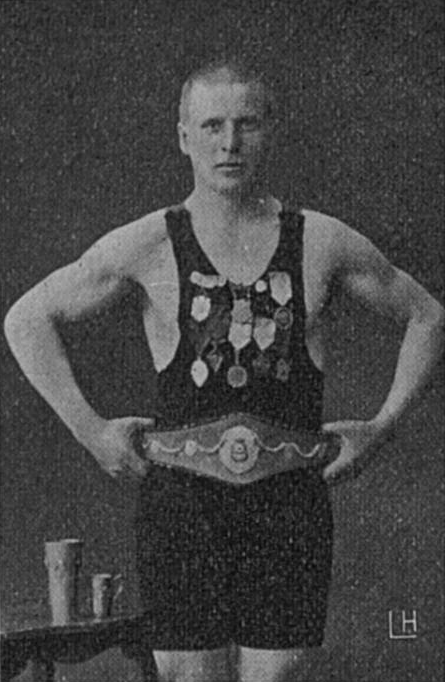
- Jussi Kivimäki wearing the Helsinki championship belt

Personal information
- Full name: Johan Richard Kivimäki
- Nicknames: Juho, Jussi
- National team: Finland
- Born: 5 February 1885 Längelmäki, Grand Duchy of Finland, Russian Empire

Sport
- Sport: Wrestling
- Club: Helsingin Jyry

Johan Richard "Jussi" Kivimäki (5 February 1885 – in absentia 1 January 1976) was a Finnish wrestler, who competed at the 1908 Summer Olympics.

== Sports ==
He won the Helsinki championship belt in 1907 and 1908.

He participated the men's Greco-Roman light heavyweight event at the 1908 Olympics, where he was eliminated in his first match by Dutch Jacob van Westrop, tying for the 9th place.

At the unofficial 1909 European Wrestling Championships he placed 6th in the 82.5+ kg Greco-Roman event.

Later he became a professional.

== Death ==
He was declared dead in absentia on 15 December 1976, with death date set to 1 January 1976.

== See also ==
- List of people who disappeared
