= 1908 Summer Olympics medal table =

1908 Summer Olympics medals
- Location: London, Great Britain

Highlights
- Most gold medals: Great Britain (56)
- Most total medals: Great Britain (146)
- Medalling NOCs: 19

World map showing the medal achievements of each country during the 1908 Summer Olympics Legend: represents countries that won at least one gold medal. represents countries that won at least one silver medal but no gold medals. represents countries that won at least one bronze medal (no gold or silver). represents participating countries that did not win medals. represents entities that did not participate at the 1908 Summer Olympics.

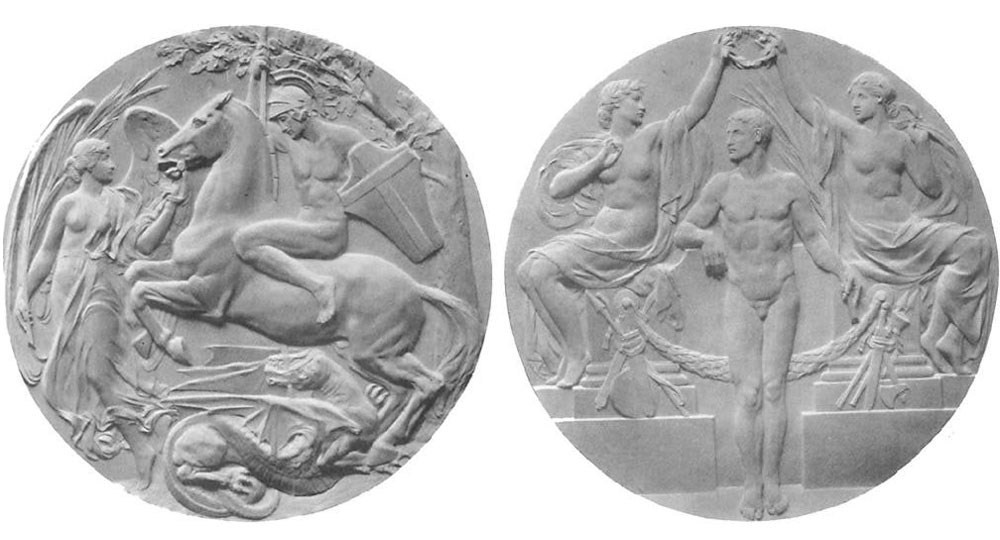
Olympic prize medal for the first three of each competition (front and obverse)

The 1908 Summer Olympics (also known as the Games of the IV Olympiad) was an international multi-sport event held from 27 April to 31 October 1908, in London, United Kingdom, coinciding with the Franco-British Exhibition.

A total of 2,008 athletes representing 22 nations participated in 110 events in 18 sports. Diving, field hockey, and figure skating were contested for the first time at these Games. Argentina, Switzerland and Turkey were the only nations that did not earn any medals.

The host nation, the United Kingdom, with by far the most competitors, dominated the medal table, collecting the most gold (56), silver (51), and bronze (39) medals. The 146 medals won at these Games—a major increase from the two medals won at the 1904 Summer Olympics in St. Louis—are still the highest number won by a British delegation at any modern Olympics. Particular success was achieved by the British team in the boxing events, where out of a possible fifteen medals across the five weight classes, they won all but the middleweight silver medal, which was taken by Reginald Baker competing for Australasia. The United States finished second in the medal standings, and Sweden third.

Australasia was the name given to the combined team of athletes from Australia (making its fourth Olympic appearance) and New Zealand (competing for the first time). The host team included a number of athletes from Ireland, at the time part of the United Kingdom. In contrast, Finland, which was integrated in the Russian Empire, competed in London as a separate country.

== Medal table ==
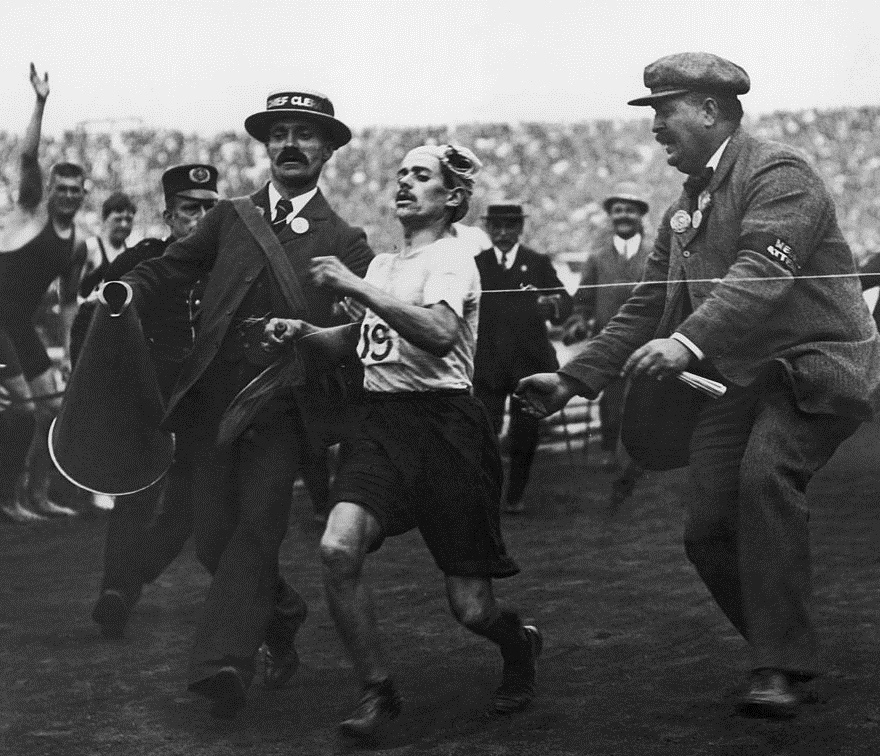
Dorando Pietri, who would have won a gold medal for Italy in the marathon but was disqualified after receiving assistance from umpires during the race, leaving the gold medal to American Johnny Hayes instead.

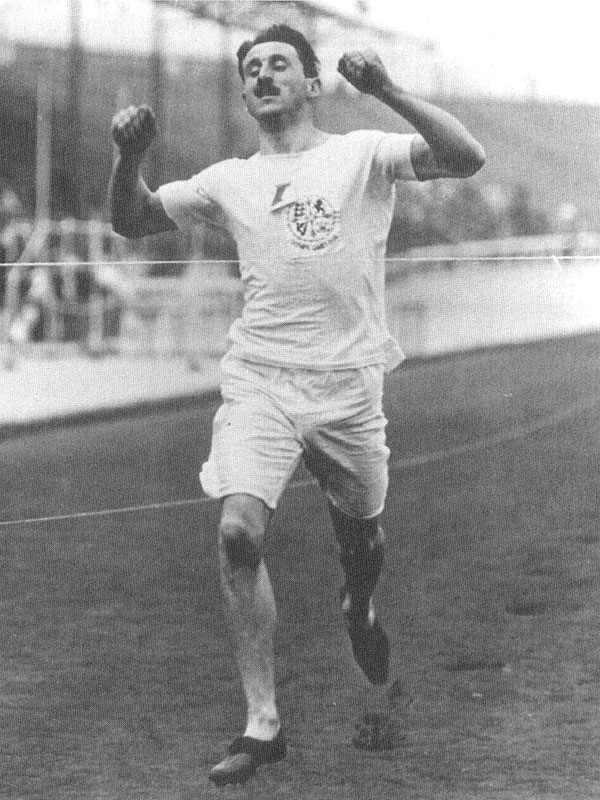
British athlete Wyndham Halswelle, who won the gold medal in the only walkover in Olympic history in the men's 400 metres race after his American competitors withdrew following a controversial judging call.

This is the full table of the medal count of the 1908 Summer Olympics, based on the medal count of the International Olympic Committee (IOC). These rankings sort by the number of gold medals earned by a country. The number of silver medals is taken into consideration next and then the number of bronze medals. If, after the above, countries are still tied, equal ranking is given and they are listed alphabetically. This information is provided by the IOC; however the IOC does not recognize or endorse any ranking system.

* Host nation (Great Britain)

1908 Summer Olympics medal table
Rank	NOC	Gold	Silver	Bronze	Total
1	Great Britain*	56	51	39	146
2	United States	23	12	12	47
3	Sweden	8	6	11	25
4	France	5	5	9	19
5	Germany	3	5	5	13
6	Hungary	3	4	2	9
7	Canada	3	3	10	16
8	Norway	2	3	3	8
9	Italy	2	2	0	4
10	Belgium	1	5	2	8
11	Australasia	1	2	2	5
12	Russian Empire	1	2	0	3
13	Finland	1	1	3	5
14	South Africa	1	1	0	2
15	Greece^{[a]}	0	3	1	4
16	Denmark	0	2	3	5
17	Bohemia	0	0	2	2
17	Netherlands	0	0	2	2
19	Austria	0	0	1	1
Totals (19 entries)		110	107	107	324

== Notes ==
^{a} Anastasios Metaxas (GRE) is generally credited with a bronze medal in men's individual trap shooting; no tie-breaker was held. The 1908 official report lists Metaxas as having tied with Alexander Maunder (GBR) and assigns bronze medals to each. However, Metaxas does not appear in the IOC medal database, which lists only Maunder as sole bronze medalist. The corrected totals are shown on this table.
