= Kálmán Vaskó =

Hungarian rower

Personal information
- Nationality: Hungarian
- Born: 23 November 1872; Szőny, Austria-Hungary
- Died: 8 August 1932 (aged 59)

Sport
- Sport: Rowing

Kálmán Vaskó (23 November 1872 – 8 August 1932) was a Hungarian rowing coxswain. He competed at the 1908 Summer Olympics and the 1912 Summer Olympics.
