= Einar Schwartz-Nielsen =

Danish fencer

Personal information
- Born: 3 October 1883 Randers, Denmark
- Died: 10 March 1939 (aged 55) Frederiksberg, Denmark

Sport
- Sport: Fencing

Einar Schwartz-Nielsen (3 October 1883 – 10 March 1939) was a Danish fencer. He competed in the individual sabre event at the 1908 Summer Olympics.
