= Douwe Wijbrands =

Dutch wrestler

Personal information
- Nationality: Dutch
- Born: 9 October 1884 Hindeloopen, Netherlands
- Died: 17 November 1970 (aged 86) Amsterdam, Netherlands

Sport
- Sport: Wrestling

Douwe Wijbrands (9 October 1884 – 17 November 1970) was a Dutch wrestler. He competed in the men's Greco-Roman light heavyweight at the 1908 Summer Olympics.
