= Ødbert E. Bjarnholt =

Danish footballer

Personal information
- Date of birth: 24 December 1885
- Place of birth: Copenhagen, Denmark
- Date of death: 3 January 1946 (aged 60)
- Place of death: Copenhagen, Denmark

International career
Years	Team	Apps	(Gls)
- Denmark

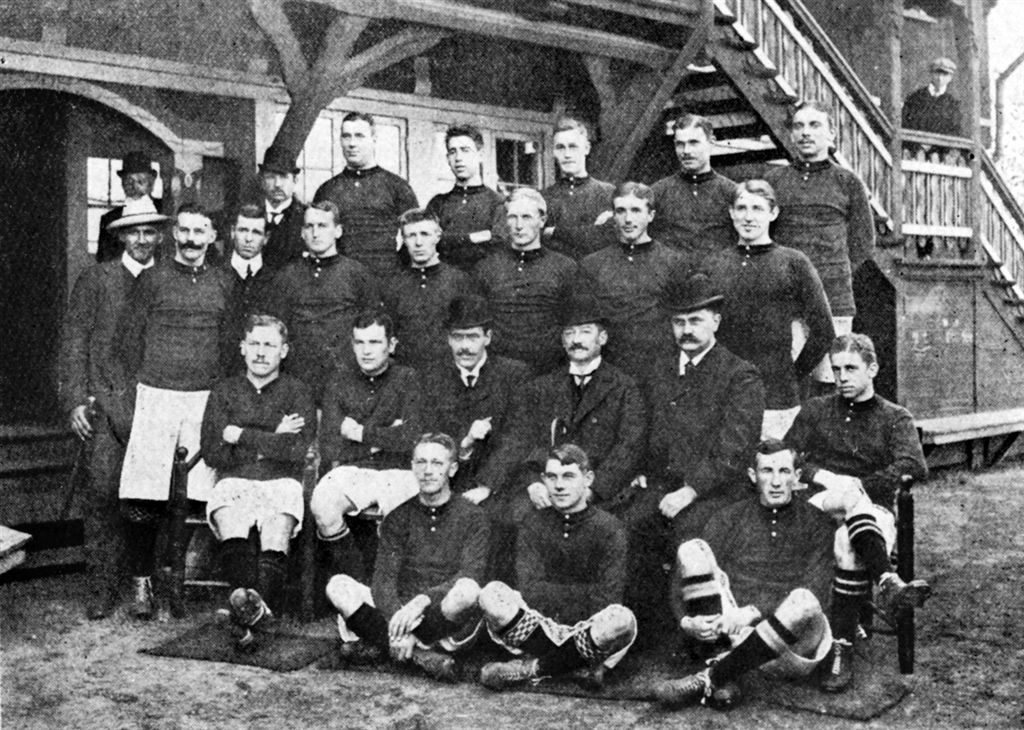
Ødbert Bjarnholt seated first in the front row

Ødbert E. Bjarnholt (24 December 1885 – 3 January 1946) was a Danish footballer. He played in one match for the Denmark national football team in 1914.
