= Yrjö Saarela =

Finnish wrestler (1884–1951)

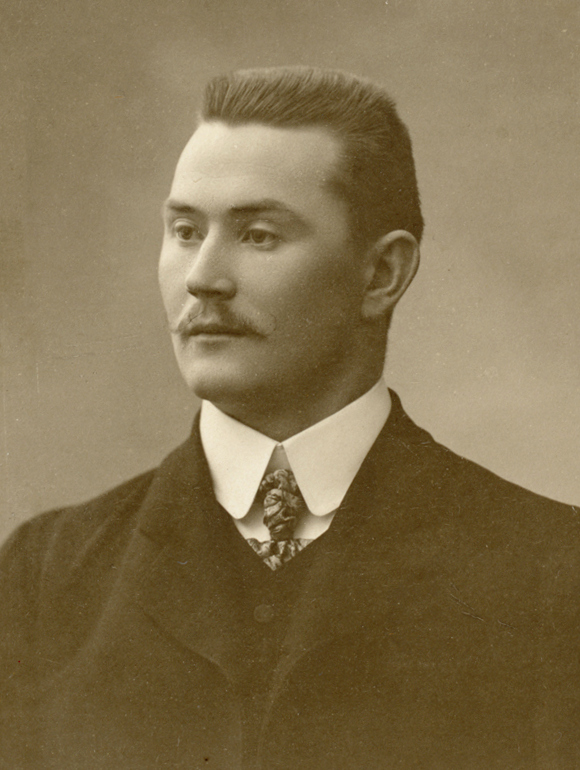
- Saarela, c. 1910

Personal information
- Full name: Yrjö Erik Mikael Saarela
- National team: Finland
- Born: Yrjö Erik Mikael Sarkkinen; 13 July 1884 Oulujoki, Grand Duchy of Finland, Russian Empire
- Died: 30 June 1951 (aged 66) Liminka, Finland
- Resting place: Oulujoki parish church cemetery
- Occupation: Farmer
- Height: 180 cm (5 ft 11 in)
- Weight: 82–86 kg (181–190 lb)
- Spouse: Ester Elisabeth Markuksela

Sport
- Sport: Greco-Roman wrestling
- Weight class: Heavyweight
- Club: Oulunsuun Pohja (1906–1912); Oulun Pyrintö (1924–)
- Turned pro: 1912
- Coached by: Carl Allén
Medal record
Men's Greco-Roman wrestling
Representing (Russia) Finland
Olympic Games
| Gold medal – first place | 1912 Stockholm | Heavyweight |
| Silver medal – second place | 1908 London | Light heavyweight |
World Championships
| Gold medal – first place | 1911 Helsinki | +83 kg |

Yrjö Erik Mikael Saarela (13 July 1884 – 30 June 1951) was a Finnish wrestler who won Olympic gold and a world championship.

== Wrestling ==
Saarela began wrestling in 1906, coached by Carl Allén.

By 1908, he was a well-established wrestler and was nominated into the Finnish Olympic team without trials.

He won silver at the 1908 Olympics, which was a single-elimination tournament:

Yrjö Saarela at the 1908 Summer Olympics Greco-Roman light heavyweight
| Round | Opponent | Result |
|---|---|---|
| First round | Henri Nielsen (DEN) | Win by fall at 3:50 |
| Second round | Edward Nixson (GBR) | Win by fall at 2:31 |
| Quarter-finals | Marcel Dubois (BEL) | Win by fall at 12:24 |
| Semi-finals | Carl Jensen (DEN) | Win by fall at 11:36 |
| Final (best out of three) | Verner Weckman (FIN) | Win by fall at 4:22 |
| Final (best out of three) | Verner Weckman (FIN) | Loss by fall at 5:07 |
| Final (best out of three) | Verner Weckman (FIN) | Loss by fall at 16:10 (silver) |

According to rumours, Weckman bribed Saarela to throw the final. Modern sportswriters Arto Teronen and Jouko Vuolle consider that there is plenty of circumstantial evidence in favour.

He won the Finnish national heavyweight championship in 1908 and 1909.

He won the over 83 kg class at the 1911 World Wrestling Championships.

Yrjö Saarela in the over 83 kg class at the 1911 World Wrestling Championships
| Opponent | Result |
|---|---|
| Emil Backenius (FIN) | Undecided |
| Alex Järvinen (FIN) | Win by fall at 2:34 |
| Adolf Lindfors (FIN) | Win by fall at 4:25 |
| Johan Olin (FIN) | Win by points |

He won the Olympic gold at the 1912 Games, which was a double-elimination tournament:

Yrjö Saarela at the 1912 Summer Olympics Greco-Roman heavyweight
| Round | Opponent | Result |
|---|---|---|
| First round | David Karlsson (SWE) | Win by fall at 32:37 |
| Second round | Jean Hauptmanns (GER) | Win by walkover |
| Third round | Gustaf Lindstrand (SWE) | Win by fall at 6:12 |
| Fourth round | Søren Marinus Jensen (DEN) | Win by fall at 3:36 |
| Fifth round | Johan Olin (FIN) | Loss by withdrawal at 6:00 |
| Sixth round | Jakob Neser (GER) | Win by fall at 6:00 |
| Final round | Søren Marinus Jensen (DEN) | Win by withdrawal at 3:16:00 |
| Final round | Johan Olin (FIN) | Win by fall at 9:00 (gold) |

The fifth round loss was a favour to Olin, who would've been eliminated otherwise. Saarela withdrew, faking a knee injury. Olin returned the favour by letting him win the gold medal match, even though Saarela was exhausted after a three-hour bout against Jensen.

He began a brief professional career after the 1912 games, wrestling mostly in international circuses touring in Finland.

His amateur status was reinstated in 1924. He returned to form at the age of 44 when he won the Finnish national heavyweight championship bronze in 1929. He was a regional coaching consultant in the Finnish Wrestling Federation in the 1930s.

He received the Cross of Merit, in gold, of the Finnish Sports from the Ministry of Education in 1948.

His Olympic medals are in the collection of the Sports Museum of Finland.

== Biography ==
His parents were Jaakko Sarkkinen and Maria Sunila, and he was born Yrjö Sarkkinen. They switched their last name after buying and moving to a farm named Saarela. He eventually inherited two thirds of the farm.

He married Ester Elisabeth Markuksela in 1910. They had children:

1. Aino Kyllikki (1910–1972)
2. Ahti Johannes (1912–1913)
3. Erkko Olavi (1913–1972)
4. Marja-Liisa (1915–1953)
5. Yrjö Eino Mikael (1920–1940)
6. Pentti Johannes (1922–1942)
7. Pirkko Kaarina (1927–). She married economist Kaarlo Larna.

His personal economy suffered when he acted as a surety to loans that defaulted during the Great Depression. His farm went bankrupt in 1931. However, thanks to an inheritance, he recovered quickly and returned to farming.

He suffered a stroke in 1944 and was paralyzed.

After he died, he was buried in his family plot. His name on the gravestone has an engraving of the Olympic rings. Saarela is the only Olympic winner from North Ostrobothnia.

== Sources ==
=== Literature ===
- Lintala, Esko (1984). Yrjö Saarela — painimattojen aristokraatti (in Finnish). Oulu: Lions Club Oulu-Oulujoki. ISBN 951-99570-3-0.
