= Peter Marius Andersen =

Danish footballer

Marius Andersen
- Andersen in 1908

Personal information
- Full name: Peter Marius Andersen
- Date of birth: 25 April 1885
- Place of birth: Copenhagen, Denmark
- Date of death: 20 March 1972 (aged 86)
- Place of death: Copenhagen, Denmark

International career
Years	Team	Apps	(Gls)
1908	Danmark	1	(0)

Medal record

Men's Football

Representing Denmark

Olympic Games
Silver medal – second place	1908 London	Team competition

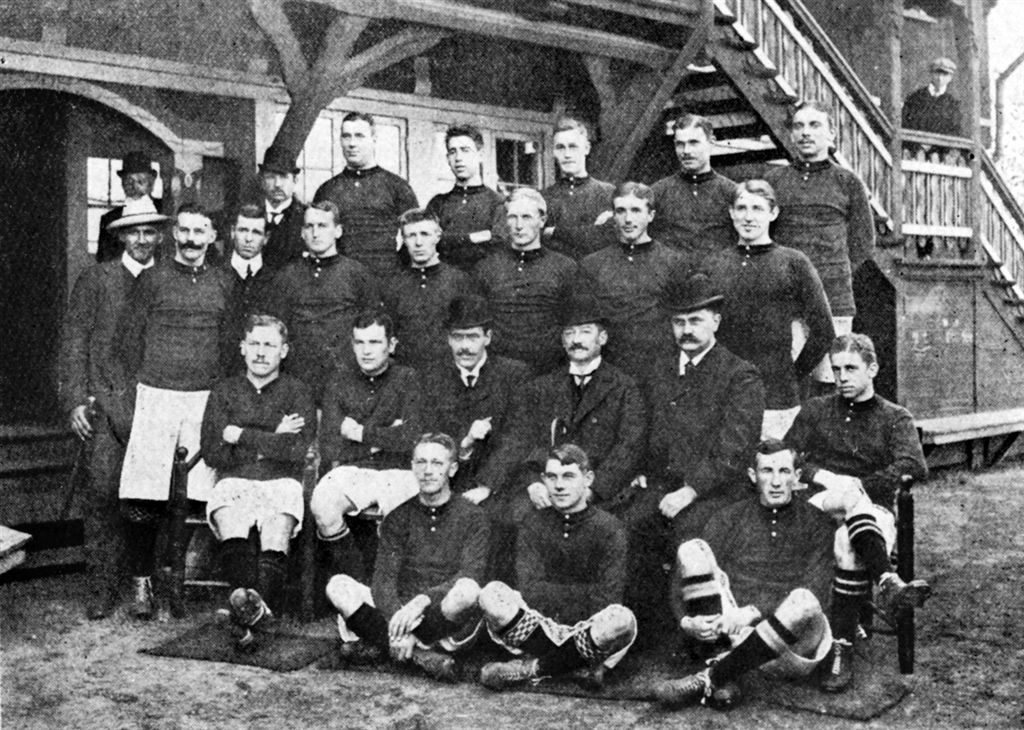
Danish football team in 1908 Olympic Games at London. Top row, f. l. t. r. two officials, Harald Hansen, Harald Bohr, Sophus Nielsen, Marius Andersen, Oskar Nielsen. Middle row, f. l. t. r. official, Johannes Gandil, Charles Williams (coach), Charles von Buchwald, Bjørn Rasmussen, Kristian Middelboe, Nils Middelboe, Ludvig Drescher. Front row, f. l. t. r. August Lindgren, Knud Hansen, H. P. Katberg (DBU), Ludvig Syslov (DBU), Dr. Jørgen Jensen (DBU), Vilhelm Wolfhagen. At the front, f. l. t. r. Ødbert Bjarnholt, Magnus Beck, Einar Middelboe.

Peter Marius Andersen (25 April 1885 – 20 March 1972) was a Danish amateur football (soccer) player in the striker position, who won a silver medal with the Danish national team in the 1908 Summer Olympics football tournament. He played one game at the tournament, his only game for the national team. He played his club football with BK Frem.
