= Aleksandr Petrov (wrestler) =

Russian Greco-Roman wrestler

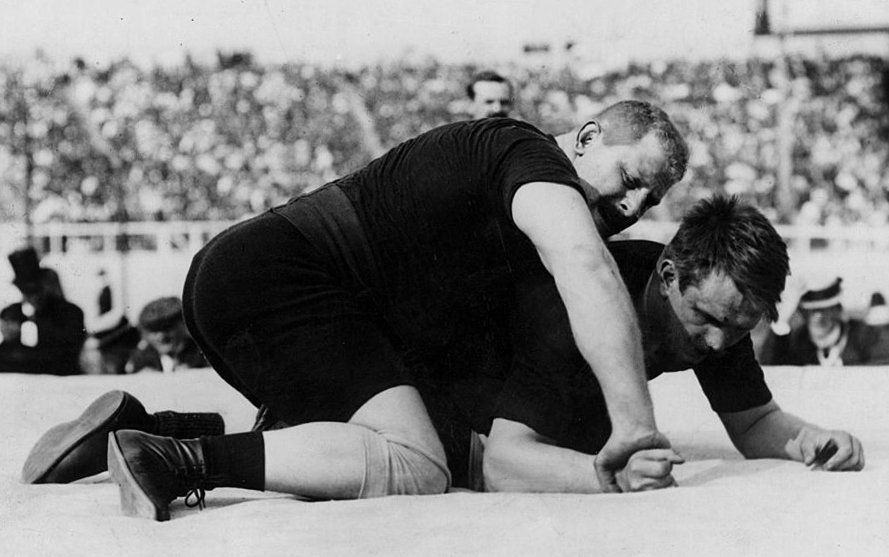
- Petrov (right) vs. Weisz at the 1908 Olympics

Personal information
- Born: 23 September 1876 Yelets, Russian Empire
- Died: February 1941 (aged 64) Leningrad, Russian SFSR, Soviet Union

Sport
- Sport: Greco-Roman wrestling
Medal record
Representing the Russian Empire
Olympic Games
Silver medal – second place	1908 London	+93 kg

Aleksandr Petrovich Petrov (Russian: Александр Петрович Петров; 23 September 1876 – February 1941) was a Greco-Roman wrestler from Russia. He won a silver medal at the 1908 Olympics after losing in the final to Richárd Weisz.

Petrov's father was an honored citizen of Yelets. He paid much attention to education of his son, and sent him to Moscow to study at a university and then at a military medical academy, where Petrov took up wrestling as part of his physical training. He also competed in gymnastics, swimming, cross-country skiing, speedskating, athletics, fencing, boxing and cycling, and later became a military sports coach and doctor. He still competed around 1930 in speedskating in the masters category, but his health rapidly deteriorated in 1938, after his right leg was amputated due to a congenital disease. He died less than three years later and was survived by his wife Serafima.
