= Frithiof Mårtensson =

Swedish wrestler (1884–1956)

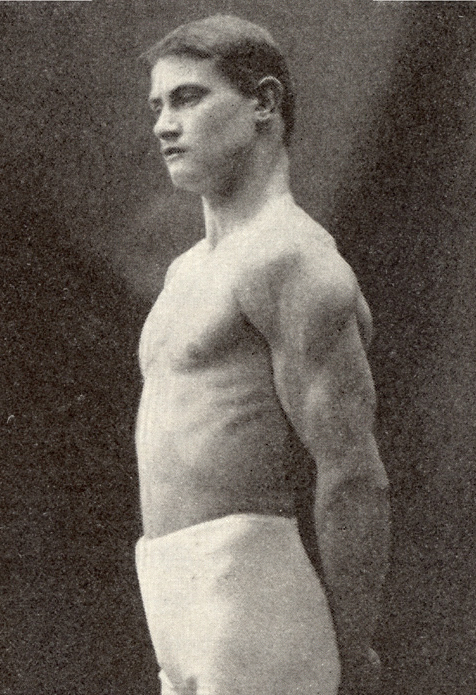

Personal information
- Born: 19 May 1884 Eslöv, Sweden
- Died: 20 June 1956 (aged 72) Stockholm, Sweden

Sport
- Sport: Wrestling
- Weight class: 73 kg
- Event: Greco-Roman wrestling
- Club: IK Sparta, Malmö
Medal record
Men's Greco-Roman wrestling
Representing Sweden
Olympic Games
Gold medal – first place	1908 London	73 kg

Folke Frithiof Martens Mårtensson (19 May 1884 – 20 June 1956) was a Greco-Roman wrestler from Sweden. He won the middleweight contests at the 1908 Summer Olympics in London and at the unofficial 1909 European Championships in Malmö.

After 1909 Mårtensson moved to Copenhagen for training as a dental technician and in 1913 to the United States. Two years later he returned to Stockholm, where he died in 1956.
