= Enrico Porro =

Italian wrestler (1885–1967)

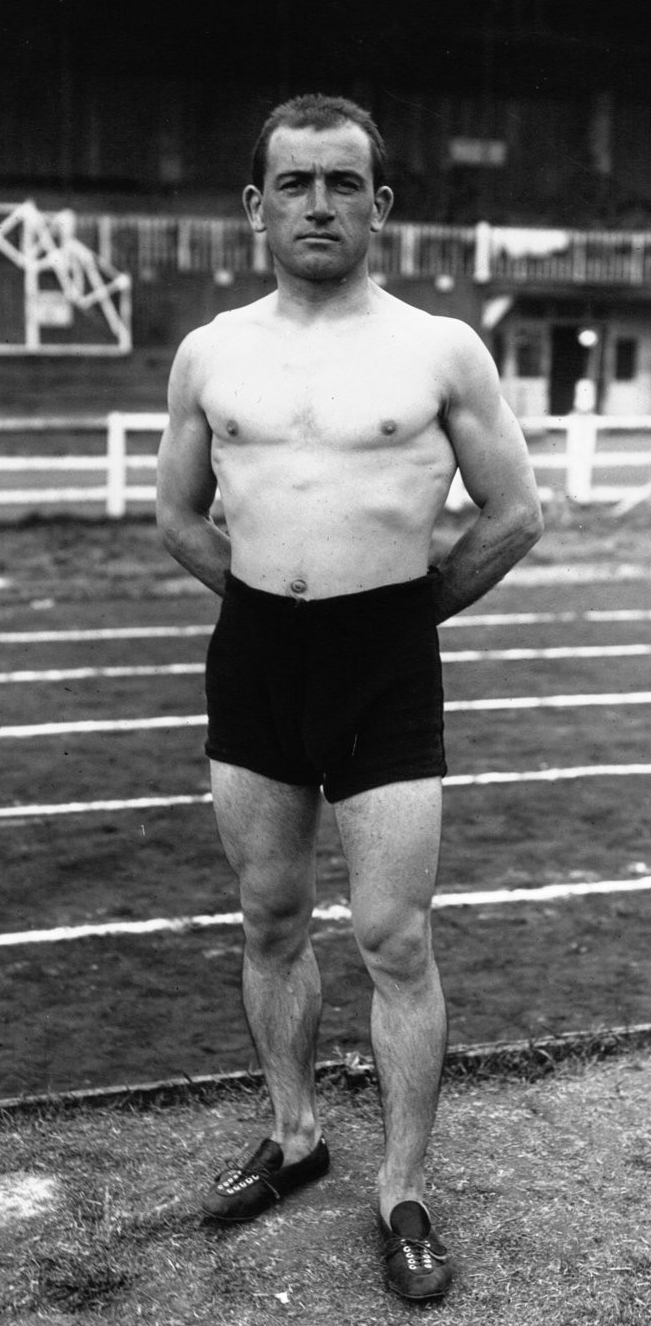

Personal information
- Nationality: Italy
- Born: 16 January 1885 Lodi Vecchio, Italy
- Died: 14 March 1967 (aged 82) Milan, Italy
- Height: 1.65 m (5 ft 5 in)
- Weight: 65 kg (143 lb)

Sport
- Country: Italy
- Sport: Wrestling
- Event: Greco-Roman
- Club: G.S. Marina Militare
- Retired: 1949
Medal record
Representing Italy
Men's Greco-Roman wrestling
Olympic Games
Gold medal – first place	1908 London	Lightweight

Enrico Porro (Enrico Aldanian, 16 January 1885 – 14 March 1967) was an Italian Greco-Roman wrestler and Olympic champion. He was the first gold medal at the Olympic Games of the Italian military sports body Gruppo Sportivo della Marina Militare (the sport section of the Italian armed force Italian Navy).

== Biography ==
Porro competed at the 1908 Summer Olympics in London where he won the gold medal in Greco-Roman wrestling, the lightweight class. He also competed at the 1920 and 1924 Summer Olympics.

== See also ==
- Italy at the 1908 Summer Olympics
