= Søren Marinus Jensen =

Danish wrestler (1879–1965)

- Weight: Heavyweight/Super Heavyweight
- Born: 5 May 1879; Skødstrup, Aarhus, Denmark
- Died: 6 January 1965 (aged 85)
- Olympic team: Denmark
Medal record
Men's Greco-Roman wrestling
Representing Denmark
Olympic Games
Bronze medal – third place	1908 London	Super heavyweight
Bronze medal – third place	1912 Stockholm	Heavyweight
Intercalated Games
Gold medal – first place	1906 Athens	Heavyweight
Gold medal – first place	1906 Athens	Overall

Søren Marinus Jensen (5 May 1879 – 6 January 1965) was a Danish sport wrestler who competed in the 1906 Intercalated Games and the 1908 and 1912 Summer Olympics. He won medals at each Game; however, the gold medals he won at the 1906 Games are no longer considered to be Olympic medals. He remains Denmark's most successful wrestler at the Olympics. In addition, he was World Champion in 1905 and won multiple European championship silver medals.

== Sporting career ==
Jensen first competed at the 1904 World Wrestling Championships, failing to finish in the top three of his weight category. Returning the following year, he was victorious in the heavyweight competition, taking the gold medal. It was the only occasion he won the world championship, although he did place third in 1910. He also placed second in the European championships on three occasions.

=== Olympics ===
He competed for Denmark at the 1906 Intercalated Games in the Greco-Roman heavyweight class and an open weight class for all Greco-Roman competitors. In the first round of the heavyweight class, he faced the Austrian wrestler Arnold, who he considered his greatest threat in the competition. After an hour of wrestling, Jensen emerged victorious.

In the second round, he faced Ronti of the German team, who weighed in excess of 120 kilograms (264 lbs). Following a victory against the German, he faced and defeated the Belgian Debouis and then Bauer from Austria to win the gold medal in the heavyweight class, at which point King George I of Greece called out to him in congratulation. Following that gold medal, he competed once more in the open competition, winning that competition as well and a second gold medal.

He competed at the following two Olympic Games, winning the bronze medal in the Greco-Roman super heavyweight event at the 1908 Summer Olympics and another bronze medal this time in the Greco-Roman heavyweight competition at the 1912 Summer Olympics. At the 1912 Games he made it to the deciding match to find out who would win the gold medal, against Finland's Yrjö Saarela. After three hours of wrestling in the open air, Jensen retired from exhaustion on a particularly hot day.

== Legacy ==
Although he won Denmark's only wrestling gold medal at an Olympic Games, those Games are no longer considered to be a true Olympic Games and instead are referred to as the 1906 Intercalated Games. Including those medals at the 1906 Games, Jensen remains Denmark's most successful wrestler at the Olympics with his four medals.
