= Carl Jensen (wrestler) =

Danish wrestler (1882–1942)

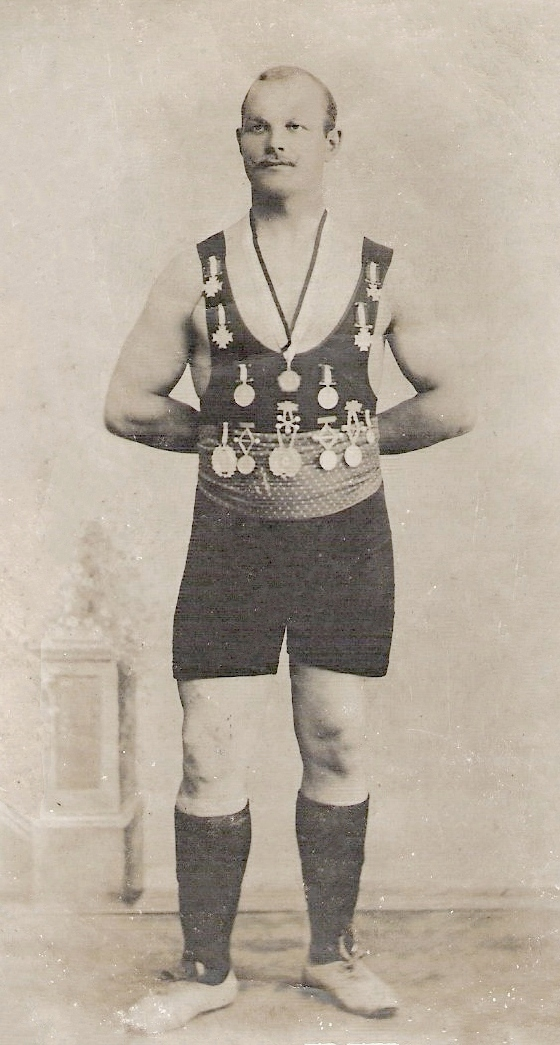

Personal information
- Full name: Carl Marinus Jensen
- Born: 13 September 1882 Dronninglund, Denmark
- Died: 4 April 1942 (aged 59) Frederiksberg, Denmark

Sport
- Sport: Greco-Roman wrestling
- Club: AK Thor, Copenhagen
Medal record
Representing Denmark
Olympic Games
Bronze medal – third place	1908 London	93 kg

Carl Marinus Jensen (13 September 1882 – 4 April 1942) was a Danish sport wrestler who competed in the 1908 Summer Olympics. He won a bronze medal in the Greco-Roman light heavyweight class. He also participated in the Greco-Roman super heavyweight competition but was eliminated in the first round.
