= Hugó Payr =

Hungarian wrestler

Personal information
- Nationality: Hungarian
- Born: 24 August 1888 Budapest, Austria-Hungary
- Died: 18 May 1976 (aged 87) Budapest, Hungary

Sport
- Sport: Wrestling

Hugó Payr (24 August 1888 – 18 May 1976) was a Hungarian wrestler. He competed in the men's Greco-Roman light heavyweight at the 1908 Summer Olympics.
