= Richárd Weisz =

Hungarian Greco-Roman wrestler (1879–1945)

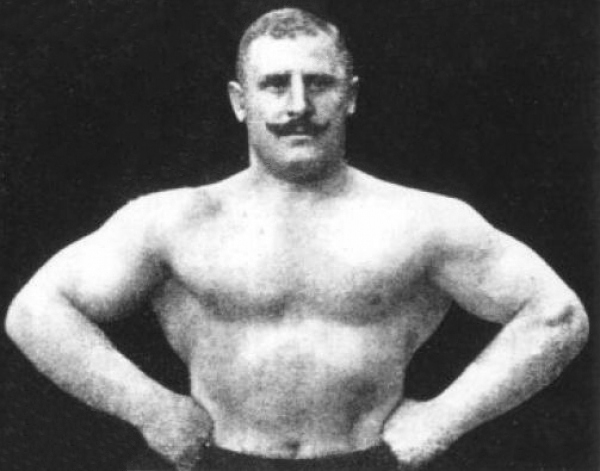
- Weisz in 1908

Personal information
- Born: 30 April 1879 Budapest, Kingdom of Hungary
- Died: 4 December 1945 (aged 66) Budapest, Hungary

Sport
- Sport: Greco-Roman wrestling
- Club: MTK Budapest
- Coached by: János Weigand
Medal record
Men's Greco-Roman wrestling
Representing Hungary
Olympic Games
Gold medal – first place	1908 London	+93 kg

Richárd Weisz (also known as Richárd Vértesi; 30 April 1879 – 4 December 1945) was a Hungarian heavyweight Greco-Roman wrestler. He competed at the 1906 Intercalated Games and at the 1908 Summer Olympics and won a gold medal in 1908.

Weisz was born in Budapest, Hungary, and was Jewish. He trained in athletics and rowing before changing to wrestling. He won an unofficial national wrestling title in 1899 and seven consecutive official titles in 1903–1909. He also competed in weightlifting and won the national heavyweight championships in 1905–1908. He was banned by the Hungarian amateur wrestling federation for participating in a professional wrestling bout against Stanislaus Zbyszko and then performed in a circus. His amateur status was restored before the 1912 Olympics, but he declined to compete due to waning motivation.

== See also ==
- List of select Jewish wrestlers
