= Fencing at the 1908 Summer Olympics – Men's épée =

Olympic fencing event

Men's épée at the Games of the IV Olympiad
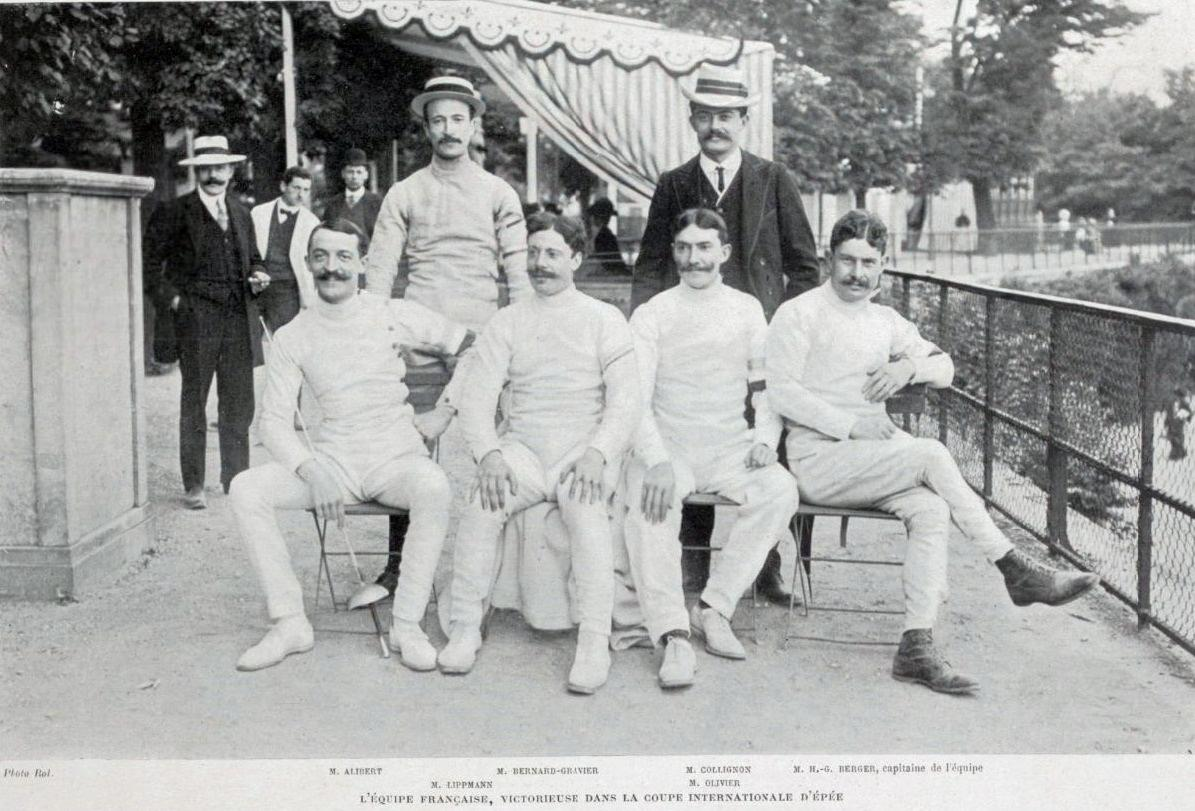
- French épéeists at the 1908 Games, including individual medalists Alibert, Lippman, and Olivier (seated, from left)
- Venue: Franco-British Exhibition fencing grounds
- Dates: July 17–24, 1908
- Competitors: 85 from 13 nations

Medalists
1st place, gold medalist(s)		Gaston Alibert; France
2nd place, silver medalist(s)		Alexandre Lippmann; France
3rd place, bronze medalist(s)		Eugene Olivier; France

The men's épée was one of four fencing events on the Fencing at the 1908 Summer Olympics programme. The competition was held from 17 to 24 July 1908 at the Franco-British Exhibition fencing grounds. There were 85 competitors from 13 nations. Each nation could enter up to 12 fencers. The medals were swept by the French fencers, who also took the gold medal in the team épée event. Gaston Alibert was the gold medalist, with Alexandre Lippmann taking silver and Eugene Olivier bronze. Officially, it was the second consecutive medal sweep in the event, though two of the three "Cuban" fencers who medaled in 1904 were actually American.

== Background ==
This was the third appearance of the event, which was not held at the first Games in 1896 (with only foil and sabre events held) but has been held at every Summer Olympics since 1900.

None of the five fencers from 1904 returned.

Bohemia, Canada, Denmark, Hungary, the Netherlands, Norway, South Africa, and Sweden each made their debut in the event. Belgium, France, Germany, Great Britain, and Italy each appeared for the second time, matching Cuba and the United States (both absent for the first time) for most among nations.

== Competition format ==
The competition was held over four rounds. In each round, each pool held a round-robin, with bouts to 1 touch. Double-touches counted as touches against both fencers. Barrages were used as necessary to determine the advancing fencers.

- First round: 13 pools of between 5 and 8 fencers each. The 3 fencers in each pool with the fewest touches against advanced to the second round.
- Second round: 8 pools of 5 fencers each (except one had only 4). The 2 fencers in each pool with the fewest touches against advanced to the semifinals.
- Semifinals: 2 pools of 8 fencers each. The 4 fencers in each pool with the fewest touches against advanced to the final.
- Final: 1 pool of 8 fencers.

== Schedule ==
Date	Time	Round
Friday, 17 July 1908		Round 1 pools A–H
Saturday, 18 July 1908	10:30; 14:30	Round 1 pools I–L; Round 1 pool M
Monday, 20 July 1908	10:30; 17:15	Quarterfinals 1–4; Quarterfinals 5–8
Thursday, 23 July 1908	10:30; 16:00	Semifinal 1 Semifinal 2
Friday, 24 July 1908	14:45	Final

== Results ==
=== First round ===
The first round was conducted in round-robin format, to one touch. Pool sizes ranged from 5 to 8 fencers. Double-touches counted against both fencers. The three contestants who had been struck the fewest times advanced.

==== Pool A ====
Fildes and von Rosen had a double-touch, as did Stöhr and Fildes.

Rank	Fencer	Nation	W	L	Notes
1	Lauritz Østrup	Denmark	5	1	Q
2	Bernard Gravier	France	4	2	Q
2	Jaroslav Šourek-Tucek	Bohemia	4	2	Q
4	Eric Carlberg	Sweden	3	3	
5	Pontus von Rosen	Sweden	2	4	
6	Georg Stöhr	Germany	1	5	
7	Luke Fildes	Great Britain	0	6	

==== Pool B ====
Double-touches were between Gates and van Schreven, Jack and Gates, and Collignon and van Schreven.

Rank	Fencer	Nation	W	L	Notes
1	Vlastimil Lada-Sázavský	Bohemia	5	1	Q
2	Charles Collignon	France	4	2	Q
3	Pietro Speciale	Italy	3	3	Q
4	Herbert Sander	Denmark	2	4	
4	Johan van Schreven	Netherlands	2	4	
6	Walter Gates	South Africa	1	5	
6	Fritz Jack	Germany	1	5	

==== Pool C ====
Blake and Dwinger had the only double-touch in this six-man pool.

Rank	Fencer	Nation	W	L	Notes
1	Jacques Marais	France	5	0	Q
2	Ejnar Levison	Denmark	3	2	Q
2	Gaston Renard	Belgium	3	2	Q
4	Johannes Adam	Germany	1	4	
4	John Blake	Great Britain	1	4	
4	Max Dwinger	Netherlands	1	4	

==== Pool D ====
The fourth pool had 8 fencers. Berger was clearly the best of the crowd, going untouched in his seven bouts. When five different fencers tied for second place at 4 touches against apiece, a playoff round-robin was held. The first playoff eliminated only one fencer, with the remaining four again tying and forcing a second playoff. That round resulted in Holt and Tvrzský tying at 1 touch apiece, eliminating the other two fencers.

Rank	Fencer	Nation	W	L	Notes
1	Henri-Georges Berger	France	7	0	Q
2	Otto Becker	Denmark	3	4	B
2	Hans Bergsland	Norway	3	4	B
2	Dino Diana	Italy	3	4	B
2	Martin Holt	Great Britain	3	4	B
2	Vilém Tvrzský	Bohemia	3	4	B
7	Albert Sarens	Belgium	1	6	
7	George van Rossem	Netherlands	1	6	

Barrage

Bergsland was hit three times, finishing sixth overall in the pool while the other four fencers in the playoff each received two hits to advance to a second playoff.

Rank	Fencer	Nation	W	L	Notes
2	Otto Becker	Denmark	2	2	B
2	Dino Diana	Italy	2	2	B
2	Martin Holt	Great Britain	2	2	B
2	Vilém Tvrzský	Bohemia	2	2	B
6	Hans Bergsland	Norway	1	3	

Second barrage

Holt and Tvrzský tied for an overall second-place finish in the pool with one touch against apiece (Tvrzský won the bout between the two, but was himself hit by Diana). Becker and Diana placed fourth.

Rank	Fencer	Nation	W	L	Notes
2	Martin Holt	Great Britain	2	1	Q
2	Vilém Tvrzský	Bohemia	2	1	Q
4	Otto Becker	Denmark	1	2	
4	Dino Diana	Italy	1	2	

==== Pool E ====
The fifth pool also included 8 fencers, but did not require a playoff. The only touch against Alibert came in a double-touch with van Löben Sels.

Rank	Fencer	Nation	W	L	Notes
1	Gaston Alibert	France	6	1	Q
2	Fernand de Montigny	Belgium	4	3	Q
2	Ivan Osiier	Denmark	4	3	Q
4	Percival Davson	Great Britain	3	4	
4	Sante Ceccherini	Italy	3	4	
6	Otakar Lada	Bohemia	2	5	
7	Robert Krünert	Germany	1	6	
7	Maurits Jacob van Löben Sels	Netherlands	1	6	

==== Pool F ====
The sixth competition pool was smaller, with only 6 fencers.

Rank	Fencer	Nation	W	L	Notes
1	François Rom	Belgium	4	1	Q
2	Giulio Cagiati	Italy	3	2	Q
2	Sydney Martineau	Great Britain	3	2	Q
4	Henry Peyron	Sweden	2	3	
5	Albert Naumann	Germany	1	4	
5	Bedřich Schejbal	Bohemia	1	4	

==== Pool G ====
Rank	Fencer	Nation	W	L	Notes
1	Leaf Daniell	Great Britain	5	1	Q
2	Vilém Goppold von Lobsdorf	Bohemia	4	2	Q
3	Fernand Bosmans	Belgium	3	3	B
3	Frédéric Dubourdieu	France	3	3	B
3	Emil Schön	Germany	3	3	B
6	Dezső Földes	Hungary	1	5	
7	Willem Hubert van Blijenburgh	Netherlands	0	6	

Barrage

The Official Report says only that Bosmans defeated Dubourdieu and Schön in the playoff, without giving further detail.

Rank	Fencer	Nation	W	L	Notes
3	Fernand Bosmans	Belgium	2	0	Q
4	Frédéric Dubourdieu	France	0	1	
4	Emil Schön	Germany	0	1	

==== Pool H ====
Rank	Fencer	Nation	W	L	Notes
1	Alfred Labouchere	Netherlands	5	1	Q
2	Paul Anspach	Belgium	4	2	Q
3	Ralph Chalmers	Great Britain	3	3	B
3	Jacques Rodocanachi	France	3	3	B
5	Jacob Erkrath de Bary	Germany	2	4	
5	Alessandro Pirzio Biroli	Italy	2	4	
7	František Dušek	Bohemia	0	6	

Barrage

The single bout between Rodocanachi and Chalmers to break the tie for third resulted in a win for the Frenchman.

Rank	Fencer	Nation	W	L	Notes
3	Jacques Rodocanachi	France	1	0	Q
4	Ralph Chalmers	Great Britain	0	1	

==== Pool I ====
The ninth pool was the first of the second day of competition, 18 July.

Rank	Fencer	Nation	W	L	Notes
1	Robert Montgomerie	Great Britain	5	1	Q
2	Gustaf Lindblom	Sweden	3	3	B
2	Giuseppe Mangiarotti	Italy	3	3	B
2	Robert Quennessen	France	3	3	B
5	Frantz Jørgensen	Denmark	2	4	
6	Percy Nobbs	Canada	0	6	
6	August Petri	Germany	0	6	

Barrage

Mangiarotti was defeated in the three-way playoff for the two remaining advancement spots.

Rank	Fencer	Nation	W	L	Notes
2	Gustaf Lindblom	Sweden	1	0	Q
2	Robert Quennessen	France	1	0	Q
4	Giuseppe Mangiarotti	Italy	0	2	

==== Pool J ====
Rank	Fencer	Nation	W	L	Notes
1	Edgar Amphlett	Great Britain	4	1	Q
1	Jetze Doorman	Netherlands	4	1	Q
3	Eugène Olivier	France	3	2	Q
4	Zulavszky Béla	Hungary	1	4	
4	Ernst Moldenhauer	Germany	1	4	
4	Pietro Sarzano	Italy	1	4	

==== Pool K ====
The eleventh pool was the smallest, with only 5 fencers.

Rank	Fencer	Nation	W	L	Notes
1	Marcelo Bertinetti	Italy	3	1	Q
2	Cecil Haig	Great Britain	2	2	B
2	Pierre le Blon	Belgium	2	2	B
2	Simon Okker	Netherlands	2	2	B
5	Georg Branting	Sweden	0	4	

Barrage

In the playoff for the second and third spots, le Blon and Haig advanced. Okker was eliminated.

Rank	Fencer	Nation	W	L	Notes
2	Pierre le Blon	Belgium	1	0	Q
2	Cecil Haig	Great Britain	1	0	Q
4	Simon Okker	Netherlands	0	2	

==== Pool L ====
Rank	Fencer	Nation	W	L	Notes
1	Alexandre Lippmann	France	4	1	Q
1	François Stuyck	Belgium	4	1	Q
3	Riccardo Nowak	Italy	3	2	Q
4	Birger Cnattingius	Sweden	1	4	
4	Edgar Seligman	Great Britain	1	4	
6	Gösta Olson	Sweden	0	5	

==== Pool M ====
The final pool also had only 5 fencers.

Rank	Fencer	Nation	W	L	Notes
1	Jean Stern	France	3	1	Q
2	Henri Davids	Great Britain	2	2	Q
2	Marcel van Langenhove	Belgium	2	2	Q
4	Julius Lichtenfels	Germany	1	3	
4	Tóth Péter	Hungary	1	3	

=== Quarterfinals ===
Seven of the eight second round pools had 5 fencers, with the eighth having only 4. 2 advanced to the semifinals from each pool.

==== Quarterfinal 1 ====
Rank	Fencer	Nation	W	L	Notes
1	Pierre le Blon	Belgium	3	1	Q
2	Jetze Doorman	Netherlands	2	2	B
2	Jean Stern	France	2	2	B
4	François Stuyck	Belgium	1	3	
5	Ejnar Levison	Denmark	0	4	

Barrage

Doorman again lost to Stern in the playoff bout.

Rank	Fencer	Nation	W	L	Notes
2	Jean Stern	France	1	0	Q
3	Jetze Doorman	Netherlands	0	1	

==== Quarterfinal 2 ====
Rank	Fencer	Nation	W	L	Notes
1	Lauritz Østrup	Denmark	3	1	Q
2	Ivan Osiier	Denmark	2	2	B
2	Gaston Renard	Belgium	2	2	B
2	Jacques Rodocanachi	France	2	2	B
5	Edgar Amphlett	Great Britain	1	3	

Barrage

Renard won the playoff pool, with no further details given in the Official Report.

Rank	Fencer	Nation	W	L	Notes
2	Gaston Renard	Belgium	2	0	Q
3	Ivan Osiier	Denmark	0	1	
3	Jacques Rodocanachi	France	0	1	

==== Quarterfinal 3 ====
Alibert continued on his perfect streak, winning four more bouts untouched.

Rank	Fencer	Nation	W	L	Notes
1	Gaston Alibert	France	4	0	Q
2	Henri-Georges Berger	France	2	2	B
2	Vilém Goppold von Lobsdorf	Bohemia	2	2	B
4	Pietro Speciale	Italy	1	3	
5	Henri Davids	Great Britain	0	4	

Barrage

Berger won the playoff, defeating von Lobsdorf again.

Rank	Fencer	Nation	W	L	Notes
2	Henri-Georges Berger	France	1	0	Q
3	Vilém Goppold von Lobsdorf	Bohemia	0	1	

==== Quarterfinal 4 ====
Rank	Fencer	Nation	W	L	Notes
1	Martin Holt	Great Britain	3	1	Q
2	Bernard Gravier	France	2	2	B
2	Robert Montgomerie	Great Britain	2	2	B
2	Vilém Tvrzský	Bohemia	2	2	B
5	Jacques Marais	France	1	3	

Barrage

Montgomerie won against Gravier and Tvrzský in the three-way playoff for the second semifinal spot.

Rank	Fencer	Nation	W	L	Notes
2	Robert Montgomerie	Great Britain	2	0	Q
3	Bernard Gravier	France	0	1	
3	Vilém Tvrzský	Bohemia	0	1	

==== Quarterfinal 5 ====
Rank	Fencer	Nation	W	L	Notes
1	Gustaf Lindblom	Sweden	3	1	Q
1	Alexandre Lippmann	France	3	1	Q
3	Leaf Daniell	Great Britain	2	2	
4	Marcelo Bertinetti	Italy	1	3	
5	Vlastimil Lada-Sázavský	Bohemia	0	4	

==== Quarterfinal 6 ====
Rank	Fencer	Nation	W	L	Notes
1	François Rom	Belgium	3	1	Q
2	Fernand Bosmans	Belgium	2	2	Q
3	Charles Colignon	France	1	3	
3	Marcel van Langenhove	Belgium	1	3	
3	Riccardo Nowak	Italy	1	3	

==== Quarterfinal 7 ====
Rank	Fencer	Nation	W	L	Notes
1	Paul Anspach	Belgium	3	1	Q
2	Alfred Labouchere	Netherlands	2	2	B
2	Sydney Martineau	Great Britain	2	2	B
2	Fernand de Montigny	Belgium	2	2	B
5	Jaroslav Šourek-Tucek	Bohemia	1	3	

Barrage

Labouchere won the three-way playoff for second place and a semifinal spot.

Rank	Fencer	Nation	W	L	Notes
2	Alfred Labouchere	Netherlands	2	0	Q
3	Sydney Martineau	Great Britain	0	1	
3	Fernand de Montigny	Belgium	0	1	

==== Quarterfinal 8 ====
Rank	Fencer	Nation	W	L	Notes
1	Cecil Haig	Great Britain	2	1	Q
1	Eugène Olivier	France	2	1	Q
3	Giulio Cagiati	Italy	1	2	
3	Robert Quennessen	France	1	2	

=== Semifinals ===
There were two semifinals, each of 8 fencers. The top 4 in each advanced to the final.

==== Semifinal 1 ====
Alibert was hit twice, both in double-touches.

Rank	Fencer	Nation	W	L	Notes
1	Gaston Alibert	France	5	2	Q
2	Cecil Haig	Great Britain	4	3	Q
2	Alfred Labouchere	Netherlands	4	3	Q
4	Robert Montgomerie	Great Britain	3	4	Q
5	Henri-Georges Berger	France	2	5	
5	Gaston Renard	Belgium	2	5	
5	François Rom	Belgium	2	5	
8	Fernand Bosmans	Belgium	0	7	

==== Semifinal 2 ====
Rank	Fencer	Nation	W	L	Notes
1	Paul Anspach	Belgium	5	2	Q
2	Martin Holt	Great Britain	4	3	Q
3	Alexandre Lippmann	France	3	4	B
3	Eugène Olivier	France	3	4	B
3	Jean Stern	France	3	4	B
6	Gustaf Lindblom	Sweden	2	5	
6	Lauritz Østrup	Denmark	2	5	
8	Pierre le Blon	Belgium	1	6	

Barrage

Rank	Fencer	Nation	W	L	Notes
3	Alexandre Lippmann	France	2	0	Q
4	Eugène Olivier	France	1	1	Q
5	Jean Stern	France	0	2	

=== Final ===
The final resulted in Alibert taking the championship after again hitting all opponents, though he suffered another pair of double-touches. There was a three-way tie for second place between two Frenchman and Montgomerie of the British team.

Rank	Fencer	Nation	W	L	Notes
1st place, gold medalist(s)	Gaston Alibert	France	5	2	
2	Alexandre Lippmann	France	4	3	B
2	Robert Montgomerie	Great Britain	4	3	B
2	Eugène Olivier	France	4	3	B
5	Paul Anspach	Belgium	2	5	
5	Cecil Haig	Great Britain	2	5	
5	Alfred Labouchere	Netherlands	2	5	
8	Martin Holt	Great Britain	1	6	

Barrage

The playoff pool for second and third resulted in wins for the two French fencers, completing France's medal sweep in the event.

Rank	Fencer	Nation	W	L
2nd place, silver medalist(s)	Alexandre Lippmann	France	2	0
3rd place, bronze medalist(s)	Eugène Olivier	France	1	1
4	Robert Montgomerie	Great Britain	0	2

== Results summary ==
Rank	Fencer	Nation	Round 1			Quarterfinals			Semifinals			Final		Total	
Rank	Fencer	Nation	W	L	Rank	W	L	Rank	W	L	Rank	W	L	W	L
1st place, gold medalist(s)	Gaston Alibert	France	6	1	1st	4	0	1st	5	2	1st	5	2	20	5
2nd place, silver medalist(s)	Alexandre Lippmann	France	4	1	1st	3	1	1st	3+2	4+0	3rd	4+2	3+0	18	9
3rd place, bronze medalist(s)	Eugène Olivier	France	3	2	3rd	2	1	1st	3+1	4+1	4th	4+1	3+1	14	12
4	Robert Montgomerie	Great Britain	5	1	1st	2+2	2+0	2nd	3	4	4th	4+0	3+2	16	11
5	Paul Anspach	Belgium	4	2	2nd	3	1	1st	5	2	1st	2	5	14	10
5	Cecil Haig	Great Britain	2+1	2+0	2nd	2	1	1st	4	3	2nd	2	5	11	11
5	Alfred Labouchere	Netherlands	5	1	1st	2+2	2+0	2nd	4	3	2nd	2	5	15	11
8	Martin Holt	Great Britain	3+2+2	4+2+1	2nd	3	1	1st	4	3	2nd	1	6	15	17
9	Henri-Georges Berger	France	7	0	1st	2+1	2+0	2nd	2	5	5th	Did not advance		12	7
9	Gaston Renard	Belgium	3	2	2nd	2+2	2+0	2nd	2	5	5th	Did not advance		9	9
9	François Rom	Belgium	4	1	1st	3	1	1st	2	5	5th	Did not advance		9	7
9	Jean Stern	France	3	1	1st	2+1	2+0	2nd	3+0	4+2	5th	Did not advance		9	9
13	Gustaf Lindblom	Sweden	3+1	3+0	2nd	3	1	1st	2	5	6th	Did not advance		9	9
13	Lauritz Østrup	Denmark	5	1	1st	3	1	1st	2	5	6th	Did not advance		10	7
15	Pierre le Blon	Belgium	2+1	2+0	2nd	3	1	1st	1	6	8th	Did not advance		7	9
15	Fernand Bosmans	Belgium	3+2	3+0	3rd	2	2	2nd	0	7	8th	Did not advance		7	12
17	Giulio Cagiati	Italy	3	2	2nd	1	2	3rd	Did not advance					4	4
17	Charles Colignon	France	4	2	2nd	1	3	3rd	Did not advance					5	5
17	Leaf Daniell	Great Britain	5	1	1st	2	2	3rd	Did not advance					7	3
17	Jetze Doorman	Netherlands	4	1	1st	2+0	2+1	3rd	Did not advance					6	4
17	Bernard Gravier	France	4	2	2nd	2+0	2+1	3rd	Did not advance					6	5
17	Marcel van Langenhove	Belgium	2	2	2nd	1	3	3rd	Did not advance					3	5
17	Vilém Goppold von Lobsdorf	Bohemia	4	2	2nd	2+0	2+1	3rd	Did not advance					6	5
17	Sydney Martineau	Great Britain	3	2	2nd	2+0	2+1	3rd	Did not advance					5	5
17	Fernand de Montigny	Belgium	4	3	2nd	2+0	2+1	3rd	Did not advance					6	6
17	Riccardo Nowak	Italy	3	2	3rd	1	3	3rd	Did not advance					4	5
17	Ivan Osiier	Denmark	4	3	2nd	2+0	2+1	3rd	Did not advance					6	6
17	Robert Quennessen	France	3+1	3+0	2nd	1	2	3rd	Did not advance					5	5
17	Jacques Rodocanachi	France	3+1	3+0	3rd	2+0	2+1	3rd	Did not advance					6	6
17	Vilém Tvrzský	Bohemia	3+2+2	4+2+1	2nd	2+0	2+1	3rd	Did not advance					9	10
31	Marcelo Bertinetti	Italy	3	1	1st	1	3	4th	Did not advance					4	4
31	Pietro Speciale	Italy	3	3	3rd	1	3	4th	Did not advance					4	6
31	François Stuyck	Belgium	4	1	1st	1	3	4th	Did not advance					5	4
34	Edgar Amphlett	Great Britain	4	1	1st	1	3	5th	Did not advance					5	4
34	Henri Davids	Great Britain	2	2	2nd	0	4	5th	Did not advance					2	6
34	Vlastimil Lada-Sázavský	Bohemia	5	1	1st	0	4	5th	Did not advance					5	5
34	Ejnar Levison	Denmark	3	2	2nd	0	4	5th	Did not advance					3	6
34	Jacques Marais	France	5	0	1st	1	3	5th	Did not advance					6	3
34	Jaroslav Šourek-Tucek	Bohemia	4	2	2nd	1	3	5th	Did not advance					5	5
40	Johannes Adam	Germany	1	4	4th	Did not advance								1	4
40	Otto Becker	Denmark	3+2+1	4+2+2	4th	Did not advance								6	8
40	Zulavszky Béla	Hungary	1	4	4th	Did not advance								1	4
40	John Blake	Great Britain	1	4	4th	Did not advance								1	4
40	Eric Carlberg	Sweden	3	3	4th	Did not advance								3	3
40	Sante Ceccherini	Italy	3	4	4th	Did not advance								3	4
40	Ralph Chalmers	Great Britain	3+0	3+1	4th	Did not advance								3	4
40	Birger Cnattingius	Sweden	1	4	4th	Did not advance								1	4
40	Percival Davson	Great Britain	3	4	4th	Did not advance								3	4
40	Dino Diana	Italy	3+2+1	4+2+2	4th	Did not advance								6	8
40	Frédéric Dubourdieu	France	3+0	3+1	4th	Did not advance								3	4
40	Max Dwinger	Netherlands	1	4	4th	Did not advance								1	4
40	Julius Lichtenfels	Germany	1	3	4th	Did not advance								1	3
40	Giuseppe Mangiarotti	Italy	3+0	3+2	4th	Did not advance								3	5
40	Ernst Moldenhauer	Germany	1	4	4th	Did not advance								1	4
40	Simon Okker	Netherlands	2+0	2+2	4th	Did not advance								2	4
40	Henry Peyron	Sweden	2	3	4th	Did not advance								2	3
40	Herbert Sander	Denmark	2	4	4th	Did not advance								2	4
40	Pietro Sarzano	Italy	1	4	4th	Did not advance								1	4
40	Emil Schön	Germany	3+0	3+1	4th	Did not advance								3	4
40	Johan van Schreven	Netherlands	2	4	4th	Did not advance								2	4
40	Edgar Seligman	Great Britain	1	4	4th	Did not advance								1	4
40	Tóth Péter	Hungary	1	3	4th	Did not advance								1	3
63	Jacob Erkrath de Bary	Germany	2	4	5th	Did not advance								2	4
63	Georg Branting	Sweden	0	4	5th	Did not advance								0	4
63	Frantz Jørgensen	Denmark	2	4	5th	Did not advance								2	4
63	Albert Naumann	Germany	1	4	5th	Did not advance								1	4
63	Alessandro Pirzio Biroli	Italy	2	4	5th	Did not advance								2	4
63	Pontus von Rosen	Sweden	2	4	5th	Did not advance								2	4
63	Bedrich Schejbal	Bohemia	1	4	5th	Did not advance								1	4
70	Hans Bergsland	Norway	3+1	4+3	6th	Did not advance								4	7
70	Dezső Földes	Hungary	1	5	6th	Did not advance								1	5
70	Walter Gates	South Africa	1	5	6th	Did not advance								1	5
70	Fritz Jack	Germany	1	5	6th	Did not advance								1	5
70	Otakar Lada	Bohemia	2	5	6th	Did not advance								2	5
70	Percy Nobbs	Canada	0	6	6th	Did not advance								0	6
70	Gösta Olson	Sweden	0	5	6th	Did not advance								0	5
70	August Petri	Germany	0	6	6th	Did not advance								0	6
70	Georg Stöhr	Germany	1	5	6th	Did not advance								1	5
79	Luke Fildes	Great Britain	0	6	7th	Did not advance								0	6
79	Willem Hubert van Blijenburgh	Netherlands	0	6	7th	Did not advance								0	6
79	Robert Krünert	Germany	1	6	7th	Did not advance								1	6
79	Maurits Jacob van Löben Sels	Netherlands	1	6	7th	Did not advance								1	6
79	George van Rossem	Netherlands	1	6	7th	Did not advance								1	6
79	Albert Sarens	Belgium	1	6	7th	Did not advance								1	6
79	František Dušek	Bohemia	0	6	7th	Did not advance								0	6

== Sources ==
- Cook, Theodore Andrea (1908). The Fourth Olympiad, Being the Official Report. London: British Olympic Association.
- De Wael, Herman. Herman's Full Olympians: "Fencing 1908". Accessed 29 April 2006. Available electronically at.
