= Fencing at the 1908 Summer Olympics – Men's team épée =

Men's team épée at the Games of the IV Olympiad
- Venue: Franco-British Exhibition fencing grounds
- Dates: July 24, 1908 (final)
- Competitors: 45 from 9 nations

Medalists
| 1st place, gold medalist(s) | | France: Gaston Alibert; Henri-Georges Berger; Charles Collignon; Eugène Olivier; Bernard Gravier; Alexandre Lippmann; Jean Stern |
| 2nd place, silver medalist(s) | | Great Britain: Leaf Daniell; Cecil Haig; Martin Holt; Robert Montgomerie; Edgar Amphlett; Edgar Seligman |
| 3rd place, bronze medalist(s) | | Belgium: Paul Anspach; Désiré Beaurain; Ferdinand Feyerick; François Rom; Fernand Bosmans; Fernand de Montigny; Victor Willems |

The men's team épée was one of four fencing events on the Fencing at the 1908 Summer Olympics programme in London. The event was won by the French team, who also swept the medals in the individual épée event. Each nation could enter a team of up to 8 fencers, with 4 fencers chosen for each match.

== Competition format ==
The tournament used a variant of the Bergvall system, holding a single elimination bracket for the gold medal with a repechage ending in a match for silver and bronze. Each match featured 4 fencers from one team facing 4 fencers from the other team, for a total of 16 individual bouts. Bouts were to 1 touch, with double-touches counting against both fencers.

With 9 teams, the main bracket consisted of a single "play-in" match in what would typically be considered the round of 16, followed by quarterfinals, semifinals, and a final. Teams defeated by the gold medalist in the main bracket moved to the repechage. With 3 teams in the repechage, a repechage "semifinal" and "final" (which awarded the silver medal to the winner and bronze medal to the loser) were held.

== Results ==
=== Main bracket ===
==== Play-in match ====
The first bout was a play-in match between the United Kingdom and the Netherlands.

| Winners | | | Losers | | |
| Nation | Fencers | Hits against | Hits against | Fencers | Nation |
|---|---|---|---|---|---|
| Great Britain | Leaf Daniell; Martin Holt; Robert Montgomerie; Edgar Seligman | 7 | 9 | Jetze Doorman; Adrianus de Jong; Alfred Labouchere; George van Rossem | Netherlands |

==== First round ====
Winners advanced, losers out. The team that was defeated by the eventual champions moved to the repechage.

| Winners | | | Losers | | |
| Nation | Fencers | Hits against | Hits against | Fencers | Nation |
|---|---|---|---|---|---|
| Italy | Marcelo Bertinetti; Giuseppe Mangiarotti; Riccardo Nowak; Abelardo Olivier | 7 | 12 | Otakar Lada; Vlastimil Lada-Sázavský; Vilém Goppold von Lobsdorf; Vilém Tvrzský | Bohemia |
| France | Gaston Alibert; Bernard Gravier; Alexandre Lippmann; Jean Stern | 6 | 10 | Ejnar Levison; Ivan Osiier; Lauritz Østrup; Herbert Sander | Denmark |
| Belgium | Paul Anspach; Désiré Beaurain; Fernand de Montigny; Victor Willems | 6 | 11 | Eric Carlberg; Gustaf Lindblom; Henry Peyron; Pontus von Rosen | Sweden |
| Great Britain | Leaf Daniell; Cecil Haig; Martin Holt; Robert Montgomerie | 5 | 13 | Jakob Erkrath de Bary; Julius Lichtenfels; August Petri; Georg Stöhr | Germany |

==== Semifinals ====
Winners advanced to play for the gold medal, loser to eventual champion was sent to repechage.

| Winners | | | Losers | | |
| Nation | Fencers | Hits against | Hits against | Fencers | Nation |
|---|---|---|---|---|---|
| France | Gaston Alibert; Henri-Georges Berger; Charles Collignon; Eugène Olivier | 5 | 12 | Leaf Daniell; Cecil Haig; Martin Holt; Robert Montgomerie | Great Britain |
| Belgium | Paul Anspach; Désiré Beaurain; Ferdinand Feyerick; François Rom | 8 | 9 | Marcelo Bertinetti; Giuseppe Mangiarotti; Riccardo Nowak; Abelardo Olivier | Italy |

==== Final ====
The winner received the gold medal, while the loser had to play the winner of the repechage in the silver medal match.

| Winners | | | Losers | | |
| Nation | Fencers | Hits against | Hits against | Fencers | Nation |
|---|---|---|---|---|---|
| France | Gaston Alibert; Bernard Gravier; Alexandre Lippmann; Eugène Olivier | 7 | 9 | Paul Anspach; Désiré Beaurain; Ferdinand Feyerick; François Rom | Belgium |

=== Repechage ===
==== Round 1 ====
Denmark and Great Britain had been defeated by France, the winner of the final, in the first two rounds. The two teams faced each other for the right to advance to the silver medal match against the loser of the final.

| Winners | | | Losers | | |
| Nation | Fencers | Hits against | Hits against | Fencers | Nation |
|---|---|---|---|---|---|
| Great Britain | Leaf Daniell; Cecil Haig; Martin Holt; Robert Montgomerie | 8 | 9 | Otto Becker; Ejnar Levison; Ivan Osiier; Herbert Sander | Denmark |

==== Silver medal match ====
The winner took the silver medal, with loser receiving bronze. The final three individual bouts of the match were not played, as Belgium was then down by 4 and unable to tie up the contest. Under Rule 50 of the competition, the decision whether to continue or not was given to the Belgian team captain, who elected not to finish the contest.

| Winners | | | Losers | | |
| Nation | Fencers | Hits against | Hits against | Fencers | Nation |
|---|---|---|---|---|---|
| Great Britain | Edgar Amphlett; Leaf Daniell; Cecil Haig; Robert Montgomerie | 5 | 9 | Paul Anspach; Fernand Bosmans; Fernand de Montigny; François Rom | Belgium |

== Sources ==
- Cook, Theodore Andrea (1908). The Fourth Olympiad, Being the Official Report. London: British Olympic Association.
- De Wael, Herman. Herman's Full Olympians: "Fencing 1908". Accessed 1 May 2006. Available electronically at.
