= Fencing at the 1908 Summer Olympics – Men's team sabre =

Men's team sabre at the Games of the IV Olympiad
- Venue: Franco-British Exhibition fencing grounds
- Dates: July 24, 1908 (final)
- Competitors: 35 from 8 nations

Medalists
1st place, gold medalist(s)		Hungary; Jenö Fuchs, Oszkar Gerde, Péter Tóth, Lajos Werkner
2nd place, silver medalist(s)		Italy; Marcello Bertinetti, Riccardo Nowak, Abelardo Olivier, Alessandro Pirzio-Biroli, Sante Ceccherini
3rd place, bronze medalist(s)		Bohemia; Vlastimil Lada-Sázavský, Vilém Goppold von Lobsdorf, Bedrich Schejbal, Jaroslav Šourek-Tucek

The men's team sabre was one of four fencing events on the Fencing at the 1908 Summer Olympics programme. The event was won by the Hungarian team, who also took the top two medals in the individual sabre event. Each nation could enter a team of up to 8 fencers, with 4 fencers chosen for each match.

== Competition format ==
The tournament used a variant of the Bergvall system, holding a single elimination bracket for the gold medal with a repechage ending in a match for silver and bronze. Each match featured 4 fencers from one team facing 4 fencers from the other team, for a total of 16 individual bouts. Bouts were to 3 touches.

With 8 teams, the main bracket consisted of quarterfinals, semifinals, and a final. Teams defeated by the gold medalist in the main bracket moved to the repechage. With 3 teams in the repechage, a repechage "semifinal" and "final" (which awarded the silver medal to the winner and bronze medal to the loser) were scheduled (Bohemia did not contest the repechage final).

== Results ==
=== Main bracket ===
==== First round ====
Winners advanced, losers out. The team that was defeated by the eventual champions moved to the repechage.

Winners			Losers		
Nation	Fencers	Bouts lost	Bouts lost	Fencers	Nation
Italy	Marcello Bertinetti; Sante Ceccherini; Abelardo Olivier; Alessandro Pirzio-Biroli	5	11	H. Evan James; William Marsh; Archibald Murray; Charles Wilson	Great Britain
France	Georges de la Falaise; Bertrand Marie de Lesseps; Marc Perrodon; Louis Renaud	6	10	André du Bosch; Etienne Grade; Antoine van Tomme; Joseph van der Voodt	Belgium
Bohemia	Otakar Lada; Vlastimil Lada-Sázavský; Vilém Goppold von Lobsdorf; Bedřich Schejbal	8	9	Jetze Doorman; Adrianus de Jong; Jacob van Löben Sels; George van Rossem	Netherlands
Hungary	Jenő Fuchs; Oszkár Gerde; Péter Tóth; Lajos Werkner	0	9	Jakob Erkrath de Bary; Fritz Jack; Robert Krünert; August Petri	Germany

==== Semifinals ====
Winners advanced to play for the gold medal, loser to eventual champion was sent to repechage.

Winners			Losers		
Nation	Fencers	Bouts lost	Bouts lost	Fencers	Nation
Bohemia	Otakar Lada; Vlastimil Lada-Sázavský; Vilém Goppold von Lobsdorf; Bedřich Schejbal	7	9	Georges de la Falaise; Bertrand Marie de Lesseps; Marc Perrodon; Louis Renaud	France
Hungary	Dezső Földes; Jenő Fuchs; Oszkár Gerde; Péter Tóth	5	11	Marcelo Bertinetti; Sante Ceccherini; Abelardo Olivier; Alessandro Pirzio-Biroli	Italy

==== Final ====
The winner received the gold medal, while the loser had to play the winner of the repechage in the silver medal match.

Winners			Losers		
Nation	Fencers	Bouts lost	Bouts lost	Fencers	Nation
Hungary	Jenő Fuchs; Oszkár Gerde; Péter Tóth; Lajos Werkner	7	9	Vlastimil Lada-Sázavský; Vilém Goppold von Lobsdorf; Bedřich Schejbal; Jaroslav Šourek-Tucek	Bohemia

=== Repechage ===
Germany and Italy had been defeated by Hungary, the winner of the final, in the first two rounds. The two teams faced each other for the right to advance to the silver medal match against the loser of the final.

==== Round 1 ====
Winners			Losers		
Nation	Fencers	Bouts lost	Bouts lost	Fencers	Nation
Italy	Marcelo Bertinetti; Riccardo Nowak; Abelardo Olivier; Alessandro Pirzio-Biroli	4	10	Jakob Erkrath de Bary; Fritz Jack; Robert Krünert; August Petri	Germany

==== Silver medal match ====
The winner took the silver medal, with loser receiving bronze. The Bohemian team refused to play the match, arguing that as finalists they had already secured second place. The organizing committee awarded silver medals to Italy, relegating the Bohemian team to bronze medals.

Winners			Losers		
Nation	Fencers	Hits against	Hits against	Fencers	Nation
Italy	No match; Bohemia did not start				Bohemia

== Sources ==
- Cook, Theodore Andrea (1908). The Fourth Olympiad, Being the Official Report. London: British Olympic Association.
- De Wael, Herman. Herman's Full Olympians: "Fencing 1908". Accessed 1 May 2006. Available electronically at.
