= Belgium at the 1908 Summer Olympics =

- IOC code: BEL
- NOC: Belgian Olympic Committee

in London
- Competitors: 88
- Medals Ranked 10th: Gold 1 Silver 5 Bronze 2 Total 8

Summer Olympics appearances (overview)
- 1900; 1904; 1908; 1912; 1920; 1924; 1928; 1932; 1936; 1948; 1952; 1956; 1960; 1964; 1968; 1972; 1976; 1980; 1984; 1988; 1992; 1996; 2000; 2004; 2008; 2012; 2016; 2020; 2024; 2028

Other related appearances
- 1906 Intercalated Games

Belgium competed at the 1908 Summer Olympics in London, England. It was the second appearance of the European nation, which had previously competed at the 1900 Summer Olympics.

== Medalists ==
Medal	Name	Sport	Event	Date
Gold	Paul Van Asbroeck	Shooting	Men's 50 yd free pistol	10 July
Silver	Oscar de Somville, Marcel Morimont, Georges Mys, Rémy Orban, Rodolphe Poma, Oscar Taelman, Alfred Van Landeghem, Polydore Veirman, François Vergucht	Rowing	Men's eight	31 July
Silver	Léon Huybrechts, Louis Huybrechts, Henri Weewauters	Sailing	6 m class	29 July
Silver	Réginald Storms	Shooting	Men's 50 yd free pistol	10 July
Silver	René Englebert, Charles Paumier du Verger, Réginald Storms, Paul Van Asbroeck	Shooting	Men's 50 yd free pistol, team	11 July
Silver	Belgium men's national water polo team: Victor Boin; Herman Donners; Fernand Feyaerts; Oscar Grégoire; Herman Meyboom; Albert Michant; Joseph Pletinckx	Water polo		22 July
Bronze	Joseph Werbrouck	Cycling	Men's 20 km	14 July
Bronze	Paul Anspach, Désiré Beaurain, Ferdinand Feyerick, François Rom	Fencing	Men's team épée	24 July

== Results by event ==
=== Athletics ===
Event	Place	Athlete	Heats	Semifinals	Final
Men's 100 metres	Heats	Victor Jacquemin	11.5 seconds 2nd, heat 6	Did not advance	
Men's 100 metres	Heats	Jean Konings	11.6 seconds 2nd, heat 4	Did not advance	
Men's 200 metres	Heats	Fernand Halbart	Unknown; 5th, heat 10	Did not advance	
Men's 400 metres	—	Victor Jacquemin	Did not finish —, heat 10		
Men's 1500 metres	Semi- finalist	François Delloye	None held	Unknown; 5th, semifinal 8	Did not advance
Men's 110 metre hurdles	Semi- finalist	Fernand Halbart	Walkover; 1st, heat 8	Did not start —, semifinal 4	Did not advance
Men's marathon	—	François Celis	None held		Did not finish

Event	Place	Athlete	Height/ Distance
Men's high jump	16th	Léon Dupont	1.67 metres
Men's standing long jump	8-25	Léon Dupont	Unknown
Men's standing high jump	8th	Léon Dupont	1.42 metres

=== Cycling ===
Belgium's best cycling result was a bronze medal won in the 20 kilometres

Event	Place	Cyclist	Heats	Semifinals	Final
Men's 660 yards	Semi- finalist	Lucien Renard	55.2 seconds 1st, heat 14	Unknown; 2nd, semifinal 4	Did not advance
Men's 660 yards	Heats	Jules Patou	Unknown; 2nd, heat 4	Did not advance	
Men's 660 yards	Heats	Joseph Werbrouck	Unknown; 2nd, heat 8	Did not advance	
Men's 660 yards	Heats	Léon Couckelberg	Unknown; 2nd, heat 15	Did not advance	
Men's 660 yards	Heats	Jean van Benthem	Unknown; 3rd, heat 12	Did not advance	
Men's 5000 metres	Semi- finalist	Guillaume Coeckelberg	None held	Unknown; 4-7, semifinal 7	Did not advance
Men's 20 kilometres	3rd	Joseph Werbrouck	None held	33:21.4; 3rd, semifinal 1	Unknown
Men's 20 kilometres	Semi- finalist	Jean van Benthem	None held	Unknown; 7-9, semifinal 2	Did not advance
Men's 20 kilometres	—	Léon Couckelberg	None held	Disqualified —, semifinal 6	Did not advance
Men's 100 kilometres	9-17	Guillaume Coeckelberg	None held	Unknown; 7-9, semifinal 2	Did not finish
Men's tandem	Semi- finalist	Léon Coeckelberg; Jules Patou	2:25.0; 1st, heat 4	Unknown; 4th, semifinal 1	Did not advance
Men's team pursuit	—	Unknown	Did not start —, heat 1	Did not advance	

=== Diving ===
Event	Place	Diver	Preliminary groups	Semi- finals	Final
Men's 10 metre platform	—	Jérome Hicketick	Did not finish —, group 2	Did not advance	

=== Fencing ===
Event	Place	Fencer	First round	Second round	Semi- final	Final
Men's épée	5th	Paul Anspach	5-2 (2nd in H)	3-1 (1st in 7)	5-2 (1st in 2)	2-5
Men's épée	Semi- finalist	Gaston Renard	3-2 (2nd in C)	2-2 (2nd in 2)	3-5 (5th in 1)	Did not advance
Men's épée	Semi- finalist	François Rom	4-1 (1st in F)	3-1 (1st in 6)	3-5 (5th in 1)	Did not advance
Men's épée	Semi- finalist	Fernand Bosmans	4-3 (3rd in G)	4-2 (2nd in 6)	4-7 (8th in 1)	Did not advance
Men's épée	Semi- finalist	Pierre le Blon	3-2 (2nd in K)	4-1 (1st in 1)	2-6 (8th in 2)	Did not advance
Men's épée	Second round	Marcel Van Langenhove	2-2 (2nd in M)	2-3 (3rd in 6)	Did not advance	
Men's épée	Second round	Fernand de Montigny	5-3 (2nd in E)	2-2 (3rd in 7)	Did not advance	
Men's épée	Second round	François Stuyck	5-1 (1st in L)	1-3 (4th in 1)	Did not advance	
Men's épée	First round	Albert Sarens	3-6 (7th in D)	Did not advance		
Men's sabre	Semi- finalist	Joseph Van der Voodt	2-2 (2nd in B)	3-1 (1st in 3)	1-6 (7th in 2)	Did not advance
Men's sabre	Second round	Étienne Grade	3-2 (2nd in C)	2-2 (3rd in 1)	Did not advance	
Men's sabre	Second round	Paul Anspach	5-2 (2nd in J)	0-4 (5th in 5)	Did not advance	
Men's sabre	First round	Antoine Van Tomme	2-2 (4th in F)	Did not advance		
Men's sabre	First round	André du Bosch	2-3 (4th in I)	Did not advance		
Men's sabre	First round	Henri Six	1-4 (5th in A)	Did not advance		
Men's sabre	First round	Alexandre Simonson	2-3 (5th in L)	Did not advance		

Event	Place	Fencers	Play-in match	First round	Semi- finals	Final	Repechage	Silver medal match
Men's team épée	3rd	Paul Anspach (all); Désiré Beaurain (1st, sf, f); Ferdinand Feyerick (sf, f, sm); François Rom (sf, f, sm) Fernand de Montigny (1st); Victor Willems (1st); Fernand Bosmans (sm)	Bye	Defeated Sweden; 11-6 Advanced to semifinals	Defeated Italy; 9-8 Advanced to final	Lost to France; 9-7 Relegated to silver medal match	Bye	Lost to Great Britain; 9-5 Won bronze medal
Men's team sabre	6th	André du Bosch; Etienne Grade; Antoine van Tomme; Joseph van der Voodt	Not held	Lost to France; 10-6 Out; 6th place	Did not advance		Not relegated	

=== Gymnastics ===
Gymnast	Event	Score	Rank
Antoine de Buck	Men's all-around	180.5	53
Jean van Guysse	Men's all-around	194	44

=== Rowing ===
Event	Place	Rowers	First round	Quarter- finals	Semi- finals	Final
Men's single sculls	5th	Joseph Hermans	Bye	Unknown; 2nd, quarterfinal 4	Did not advance	
Men's eight	2nd	Oscar Taelman, Marcel Morimont, Rémy Orban, Georges Mys, François Vergucht, Polydore Veirman, Oscar de Somville, Rodolphe Poma, Alfred Van Landeghem	None held	Bye	8.22; 1st, semifinal 2	Unknown

=== Sailing ===
Class	Place	Boat	Sailors
6 metre	2nd	Zut	Léon Huybrechts, Louis Huybrechts, Henri Weewauters

=== Shooting ===
Event	Place	Shooter	Score
Men's 300 metre free rifle	35th	Ernest Ista	701
Men's 300 metre free rifle	36th	Fernand Rey	698
Men's team free rifle	5th	Paul van Asbroeck; Joseph Geens; Ernest Ista; Edouard Poty; Henri Sauveur; Charles Paumier du Verger	4509
Men's individual pistol	1st	Paul van Asbroeck	490
Men's individual pistol	2nd	Réginald Storms	487
Men's individual pistol	15th	René Englebert	441
Men's individual pistol	37th	Jacques Pinchart	372
Men's team pistol	2nd	Paul van Asbroeck; René Englebert; Réginald Storms; Charles Paumier du Verger	1863

=== Swimming ===
Event	Place	Swimmer	Heats	Semifinals	Final
Men's 100 metre freestyle	Heats	André Duprez	1:18.0; 2nd, heat 9	Did not advance	
Men's 100 metre freestyle	Heats	Herman Meyboom	Unknown; 3-6, heat 1	Did not advance	
Men's 100 metre freestyle	Heats	Victor Boin	Unknown; 3-4, heat 4	Did not advance	
Men's 100 metre freestyle	Heats	Fernand Feyaerts	Unknown; 3-4, heat 6	Did not advance	
Men's 100 metre backstroke	—	Oscar Grégoire	Did not finish —, heat 6	Did not advance	
Men's 200 metre breaststroke	Semi- finalist	Félicien Courbet	3:16.4; 1st, heat 7	Unknown; 4th, heat 2	Did not advance
Men's 200 metre breaststroke	Heats	Pierre Strauwen	Unknown; 4th, heat 3	Did not advance	

=== Water polo ===
Event	Place	Water poloists	Quarterfinals	Semifinals	Final
Men's water polo	2nd	Victor Boin, Herman Donners, Fernand Feyaerts, Oscar Grégoire, Herman Meyboom, Albert Michant, Joseph Pletinckx	Defeated Netherlands; 8-1	Defeated Sweden; 8-4	Lost to Great Britain; 9-2

=== Wrestling ===
Event	Place	Wrestler	Round of 32	Round of 16	Quarter- finals	Semi- finals	Final
Greco-Roman lightweight	17th	Lucien Hansen	Lost to Lindén	Did not advance			
Greco-Roman lightweight	17th	Fernand Steens	Lost to Carlsen	Did not advance			
Greco-Roman light heavyweight	5th	Marcel Dubois	Defeated; Foskett	Defeated; Brown	Lost to Saarela	Did not advance	
Greco-Roman light heavyweight	9th	August Meesen	Bye	Lost to Banbrook	Did not advance		

Opponent nation	Wins	Losses	Percent
Denmark	0	1	.000
Finland	0	2	.000
Great Britain	2	1	.667
Total	2	4	.333

== Sources ==
- Cook, Theodore Andrea (1908). The Fourth Olympiad, Being the Official Report. London: British Olympic Association.
- De Wael, Herman (2001). "Top London 1908 Olympians". Herman's Full Olympians. Archived from the original on 12 July 2006.
