= Bohemia at the 1908 Summer Olympics =

- IOC code: BOH
- NOC: Bohemian Committee for the Olympic Games

in London
- Competitors: 19 in 5 sports
- Medals Ranked 17th: Gold 0 Silver 0 Bronze 2 Total 2

Summer Olympics appearances (overview)
- 1900; 1904; 1908; 1912

Other related appearances
- 1906 Intercalated Games –––– Czechoslovakia (1920–1992); Czech Republic (1994–pres.)

Bohemia competed at the 1908 Summer Olympics in London, England as an independent team, though it was part of Austria-Hungary at the time.

== Medalists ==
Medal	Name	Sport	Event	Date
Bronze	Vilém Goppold von Lobsdorf	Fencing	Men's sabre	July 24
Bronze	Otakar Lada, Vlastimil Lada-Sázavský, Bedřich Schejbal, Jaroslav Tuček, Vilém Goppold von Lobsdorf	Fencing	Men's team sabre	July 24

== Results by event ==
=== Athletics ===
Event	Place	Athlete	Heats	Semifinals	Final
Men's 5 miles	Semi- finalist	Arnošt Nejedlý	None held	Unknown; 3rd, semifinal 6	Did not advance
Men's marathon	18th	Arnošt Nejedlý	None held		3:26:26.2

Event	Place	Athlete	Height/ Distance
Men's discus throw	12-42	František Souček	Unknown
Men's discus throw	12-42	Miroslav Šustera	Unknown
Men's Greek discus	11-23	Miroslav Šustera	Unknown
Men's freestyle javelin	10-33	František Souček	Unknown

=== Fencing ===
Bohemia refused to fence Italy in the silver medal match of the men's team sabre, contending that the repechage system was unfair.

Event	Place	Fencer	First round	Second round	Semi- final	Final
Men's épée	Second round	Vilém Tvrzský	4-4 (2nd in D)	2-2 (3rd in 4)	Did not advance	
Men's épée	Second round	Vilém Goppold von Lobsdorf	4-2 (2nd in G)	2-2 (3rd in 3)	Did not advance	
Men's épée	Second round	Vlastimil Lada-Sázavský	5-1 (1st in B)	0-4 (5th in 5)	Did not advance	
Men's épée	Second round	Jaroslav Tuček	4-2 (2nd in A)	1-3 (5th in 7)	Did not advance	
Men's épée	First round	Bedřich Schejbal	1-4 (5th in F)	Did not advance		
Men's épée	First round	Otakar Lada	3-5 (6th in E)	Did not advance		
Men's épée	First round	František Dušek	0-6 (7th in H)	Did not advance		
Men's sabre	3rd	Vilém Goppold von Lobsdorf	7-0 (1st in J)	3-1 (1st in 3)	5-2 (1st in 2)	4-3
Men's sabre	Second round	Bedřich Schejbal	3-2 (2nd in L)	1-2 (3rd in 4)	Did not advance	
Men's sabre	Second round	Otakar Lada	3-1 (1st in B)	2-2 (3rd in 5)	Did not advance	
Men's sabre	Second round	Vilém Tvrzský	3-2 (3rd in K)	0-3 (4th in 4)	Did not advance	
Men's sabre	Second round	Vlastimil Lada-Sázavský	3-2 (2nd in A)	1-3 (4th in 7)	Did not advance	
Men's sabre	First round	Jaroslav Šourek-Tuček	1-4 (5th in A)	Did not advance		
Men's sabre	First round	František Dušek	2-4 (5th in M)	Did not advance		

Event	Place	Fencers	Play-in match	First round	Semi- finals	Final	Repechage	Silver medal match
Men's team épée	6th	Otakar Lada; Vlastimil Lada-Sázavský; Vilém Goppold von Lobsdorf; Vilém Tvrzský	Bye	Lost to Italy; 12-5 Out; 6th place	Did not advance		Not relegated	
Men's team sabre	3rd	Vlastimil Lada-Sázavský (all); Vilém Goppold von Lobsdorf (all); Bedřich Schejbal (all); Jaroslav Šourek-Tuček (f) Otakar Lada (1st, sf)	Not held	Defeated Netherlands; 9-8 Advanced to semifinals	Defeated France; 9-7 Advanced to final	Lost to Hungary; 9-7 Relegated to silver medal match	Bye	Lost to Italy; Walkover Won bronze medal

=== Gymnastics ===
Gymnast	Event	Score	Rank
Josef Čada	Men's all-around	222.5	25
Bohumil Honzátko	Men's all-around	205.5	36

=== Tennis ===
Event	Place	Name	Round of 64	Round of 32	Round of 16	Quarter- finals	Semi- finals	Final
Men's singles	9th	Bohuslav Hykš	Bye	Defeated Zsigmondy	Lost to Dixon	Did not advance		
Men's singles	9th	David Slíva	Bye	Bye	Lost to Brown	Did not advance		
Men's singles	16th	Ladislav Žemla	Bye	Lost to R. Powell	Did not advance			
Men's singles	26th	Jozef Micovský	Lost to Tóth	Did not advance				
Men's doubles	11th	Bohuslav Hykš; David Slíva	None held	Lost to Gauntlett/Kitson	Did not advance			

Opponent nation	Wins	Losses	Percent
Canada	0	2	.000
Great Britain	0	1	.000
Hungary	1	1	.500
South Africa	0	1	.000
Total	1	5	.167

=== Wrestling ===
All 4 Bohemian wrestlers lost their first match.

Event	Place	Wrestler	Round of 32	Round of 16	Quarter- finals	Semi- finals	Final
Greco-Roman lightweight	17th	Karel Halík	Lost to Wood	Did not advance			
Greco-Roman middleweight	9th	Jaroslav Týfa	Bye	Lost to Belmer	Did not advance		
Greco-Roman middleweight	17th	Josef Bechyně	Lost to Mårtensson	Did not advance			
Greco-Roman light heavyweight	17th	Miroslav Šustera	Lost to West	Did not advance			

Opponent nation	Wins	Losses	Percent
Great Britain	0	2	.000
Netherlands	0	1	.000
Sweden	0	1	.000
Total	0	4	.000

== Sources ==
- Cook, Theodore Andrea (1908). The Fourth Olympiad, Being the Official Report. London: British Olympic Association.
- De Wael, Herman (2001). "Top London 1908 Olympians". Herman's Full Olympians. Archived from the original on 12 July 2006.
