= Fencing at the 1908 Summer Olympics =

Coordinates: 51.5075°N 0.2211°W

Fencing at the Games of the IV Olympiad
- Venue: Franco-British Exhibition fencing grounds
- Dates: July 17–24
- No. of events: 4
- Competitors: 131 from 14 nations

The 1908 Summer Olympics in London featured four fencing events, where it was the first to lack a foil competition. Foil fencing, "not being in the opinion of the organisers a form of sport which is improved by competition," was held only as a display. The 1908 Olympics did introduce team sabre and épée competitions. As in the 1904 edition, the London Games held no events for masters; all fencing was done by amateurs.

== Medal summary ==
Event	Gold	Silver	Bronze
Épée, Individual	Gaston Alibert; France	Alexandre Lippmann; France	Eugène Olivier; France
Épée, Team	France; Gaston Alibert; Herman Georges Berger; Charles Collignon; Eugène Olivier	Great Britain; Charles Leaf Daniell; Cecil Haig; Martin Holt; Robert Montgomerie	Belgium; Paul Anspach; Desire Beaurain; Ferdinand Feyerick; François Rom
Sabre, Individual	Jenő Fuchs; Hungary	Béla Zulawszky; Hungary	Vilém Goppold von Lobsdorf; Bohemia
Sabre, Team	Hungary; Jenő Fuchs; Oszkár Gerde; Péter Tóth; Lajos Werkner; Dezső Földes	Italy; Marcello Bertinetti; Riccardo Nowak; Abelardo Olivier; Alessandro Pirzio-Biroli; Sante Ceccherini	Bohemia; Vlastimil Lada-Sázavský; Vilém Goppold von Lobsdorf; Bedřich Schejbal; Jaroslav Šourek-Tuček; Otakar Lada

== Participating nations ==
131 fencers from 14 nations competed.

- Austria (1)
- Belgium (18)
- Bohemia (7)
- Canada (1)
- Denmark (8)
- France (22)
- Germany (10)
- Great Britain (23)
- Hungary (8)
- Italy (11)
- Netherlands (13)
- Norway (1)
- South Africa (1)
- Sweden (7)

== Medal table ==
Rank	Nation	Gold	Silver	Bronze	Total
1	France	2	1	1	4
2	Hungary	2	1	0	3
3	Great Britain	0	1	0	1
3	Italy	0	1	0	1
5	Bohemia	0	0	2	2
6	Belgium	0	0	1	1
Totals (6 entries)		4	4	4	12
