= Johann Adam =

Johann Adam may refer to:

- Johannes Adam (1871–?), German fencer
- Johann Adam (composer) (c. 1705–1779), German violist and composer
- Johann Friedrich Adam (1780–1838), botanist from St. Petersburg, Russia
