= Riccardo Nowak =

Italian fencer (1879–1950)

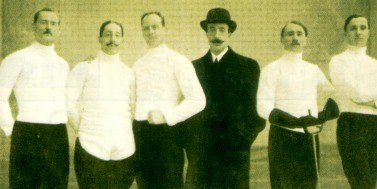
- Riccardo Nowak (first from right)

Personal information
- Born: 25 December 1879 Bergamo, Italy
- Died: 18 February 1950 (aged 70) Bergamo, Italy

Sport
- Sport: Fencing
Medal record
Men's fencing
Representing Italy
Olympic Games
Silver medal – second place	1908 London	Sabre, Team

Riccardo Nowak (25 December 1879 – 18 February 1950) was an Italian épée, foil and sabre fencer who took part in the 1908 Olympic Games in London.

== Biography ==
Nowak won an Olympic silver medal in fencing at the 1908 Summer Olympics in London. He was part of the Italian team that finished second in the sabre behind Hungary. The others in the team were Marcello Bertinetti, Sante Ceccherini, Alessandro Pirzio Biroli and Abelardo Olivier.
