= Van Tomme =

Van Tomme or Vantomme is a surname. Notable people with the surname include:

- André Vantomme (born 1948), French politician
- Antoine Van Tomme, Belgian fencer
- Maxime Vantomme (born 1986), Belgian cyclist
