= Hans Bergsland =

Norwegian fencer

Personal information
- Born: 15 November 1878 Kristiania, Norway
- Died: 9 June 1956 (aged 77) Oslo, Norway

Sport
- Sport: Fencing
- Club: Kristiania FK

Achievements and titles
- Olympic finals: 1908, 1912

Hans Bergsland (15 November 1878 – 9 June 1956) was a Norwegian fencer, sports official and businessperson.

He was born in Kristiania, was an older brother of Jacob Bergsland and represented the fencing club Kristiania FK. He competed at the 1908 (épée) and 1912 Summer Olympics (épée and team épée).

He finished his secondary education in 1897, took commercial education in Germany, France and England and the cand.philol. degree in 1901. From 1916 to 1922 he ran the company Peter Petersen & Co. He was the chief executive of Helsingborg Galoger and co-owner of Sandnes Kamgarn Spinneri. He was a supervisory council member of Livsforsikringsselskapet Fram and deputy member of Christiania Bank og Kreditkasse.

He was a member of Bærum municipal council, and was a board member of the municipal cinematographer. He chaired his own fencing club and the Norwegian Fencing Federation, and was a board member of the Norwegian Trekking Association. Among others, he worked with the 50 kilometre ski slope in Holmenkollen.

He received the King's Medal of Merit in gold and the Swedish Olympia Medal, and was decorated as a Chevalier of the Legion of Honour. He died in 1956.
