= Otto Becker =

Otto Becker may refer to:

- Otto Becker (equestrian) (born 1958), German Olympic show jumper
- Otto Becker (fencer) (1887–1970), Danish Olympic fencer
- Otto Heinrich Enoch Becker (1828–1890), German ophthalmologist
