= Marcel Van Langenhove =

Marcel Van Langenhove may refer to:

- Marcel Van Langenhove (fencer), Belgian Olympic fencer
- Marcel Van Langenhove (referee) (born 1944), Belgian football referee
