= Quennessen =

Quennessen is a surname. Notable people with the surname include:

- Robert Quennessen (1888–1940), French fencer
- Valérie Quennessen (1957–1989), French actress
