= J. P. Blake =

British fencer

Personal information
- Full name: John Percy Blake
- Nickname: Jack
- Born: 13 November 1874 Richmond, London, England
- Died: 19 December 1950 (aged 76) London, England

Sport
- Sport: Fencing
Medal record
Men's fencing
Representing United Kingdom
Olympic Games
Silver medal – second place	1912 Stockholm	Épée, team

John Percy Blake (13 November 1874 – 19 December 1950) was a British local politician and sportsman. He competed for the United Kingdom at fencing at the 1908, 1912 and 1920 Summer Olympics. He was also a keen player of water polo and an amateur boxer. In 1911, he won the épée title at the British Fencing Championships.

During the First World War, Blake was in charge of the priority section of the High Explosives Section of the Ministry of Munitions. In 1919 he was elected to the London County Council as Progressive Party councillor representing Islington. He was re-elected for a second three-year term in 1922 and joined the Labour Party in 1924. From 1925 to 1931, he was a councillor representing Camberwell, Peckham. He lost his seat at the 1931 county council election but returned to the LCC as an alderman in 1934, holding his seat until 1946. He was Chairman of the London County Council for 1942–43. He was a member of the LCC Entertainments and Fire Brigade Committees, and of the Port of London Authority.

== Olympic events ==
- 1908 Summer Olympics in London
  - Fencing – Épée, individual
- 1912 Summer Olympics in Stockholm
  - Fencing – Épée, individual
  - Fencing – Épée, team – Silver medal
- 1920 Summer Olympics in Antwerp
  - Fencing – Épée, individual
  - Fencing – Épée, team

Civic offices
Preceded by Charles Ammon	Chairman of the London County Council; 1942–1943	Succeeded by Alfred Baker
