= Johann Adam (composer) =

German violist and composer (1705–1779)

Johann Adam (c. 1705 – 13 November 1779) was a German violist and composer of the Baroque era.

== Life ==
Little is known about Johann Adam's early years and his birth year is an estimate. In 1733, he was listed as a Jagdpfeiffer at the Royal court in Dresden. In 1737 he was transferred to the Hofkapelle as a violist with a yearly salary of 400 thaler. From around 1740, he was also well known as a composer of ballet music which was played during operas, particularly those of Hasse, and from 1763 to 1769, he was employed as the director and composer of the Elector's French Theater. In 1775, Charles Burney said of him: "Mr. Adam, a veteran musicien, one of the few remaining performers in the celebrated opera-band, under the direction of Signor Hasse, has established himself a great reputation by his composition of the music to the dances performed at this opera in its most flourishing state".

== Works ==
Many of Adam's compositions have been lost. Below is a list of his known works which are listed in RISM. As well as these, there are several movements of ballet music inserted into operas which also survive.

- Oboe Concerto in B♭ major
- Oboe Concerto in G major (also attributed to Bernasconi as a Flute Concerto)
- Flute Concerto in D major
- Flute Concerto in G major (previously attributed to Quantz as QV5: Anh.22)
- Harpsichord Concerto in F major
- Concerto for 2 flutes in G major
- Concerto for 2 flutes in C major
- Sinfonia in G major for strings (without violas) and continuo
- Sinfonia in D major for strings and continuo
- Sinfonia in F major for strings and continuo (also attributed to Giovanni Battista Sammartini as JenS D36]]; also in a version for strings, 2 flutes, 2 horns, 2 bassoons and continuo
- Jagd Sinfonia in D major for strings,2 horns and continuo
- Sinfonia in D major for strings, 2 horns, bassoon and continuo
- Partita in B♭ major for strings (without violas), 2 oboes and continuo
- Partita in E♭ major for strings, 2 oboes and continuo
- Sonata for 2 flutes in G major
- Ballet Music La Tempête (only flute parts surviving)
- Sacred Cantata Wie lieblich sind deine Wohnungen (composed 1735 or before)
- Polonaise Fackel-Tanz for 2 oboes, 2 horns, 2 violins and continuo
- Recueil d'airs à danser execute's sur le Théâtre du Roi à Dresde accommode's pour le clavecin (Published Leipzig: Johann Gottlob Immanuel Breitkopf, 1756)

Among his missing works are a Flute Concerto in C major, 3 Oboe Concertos, a Minuet from 1769, a Sinfonia in F major, a Bassoon Concerto, and a Trio for violin or flute and harp.
