= Norwegian Fencing Federation =

Norwegian fencing organization

The Norwegian Fencing Federation (Norges Fekteforbund, NF) is the national organisation for fencing in Norway. The headquarters are in Oslo. It was established in 1911. In 2018, it had around 1800 members.

== Notable presidents ==
- Severin Finne, president of the Norwegian Fencing Federation (1921-1923) and (1924-1925)
