= Bernard Gravier =

French fencer (1881–1923)

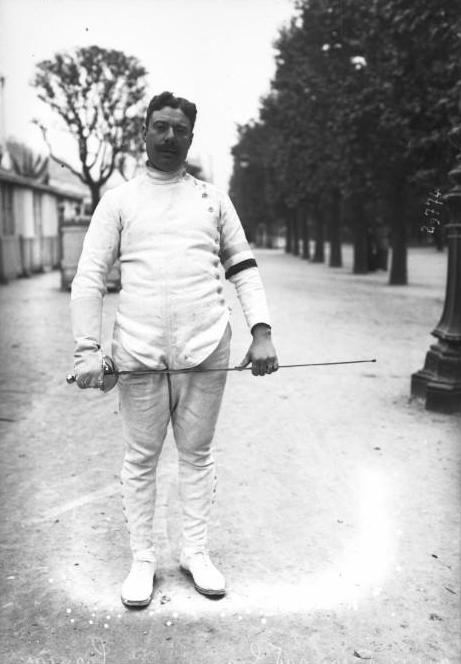

Personal information
- Born: 20 February 1881
- Died: 13 August 1923 (aged 42)

Sport
- Sport: Fencing
Medal record
Men's fencing
Representing France
Olympic Games
Gold medal – first place	1908 London	Team épée

Bernard Gravier (20 February 1881 – 13 August 1923) was a French fencer. He won a gold medal in the team épée event at the 1908 Summer Olympics.
