= Albert Naumann =

German fencer

Personal information
- Born: 19 May 1875 Plauen, German Empire
- Died: 14 July 1952 (aged 77) Lübben, East Germany

Sport
- Sport: Fencing

Albert Naumann (19 May 1875 – 14 July 1952) was a German fencer. He competed at the 1908 and 1912 Summer Olympics.
