= François Rom =

Belgian fencer

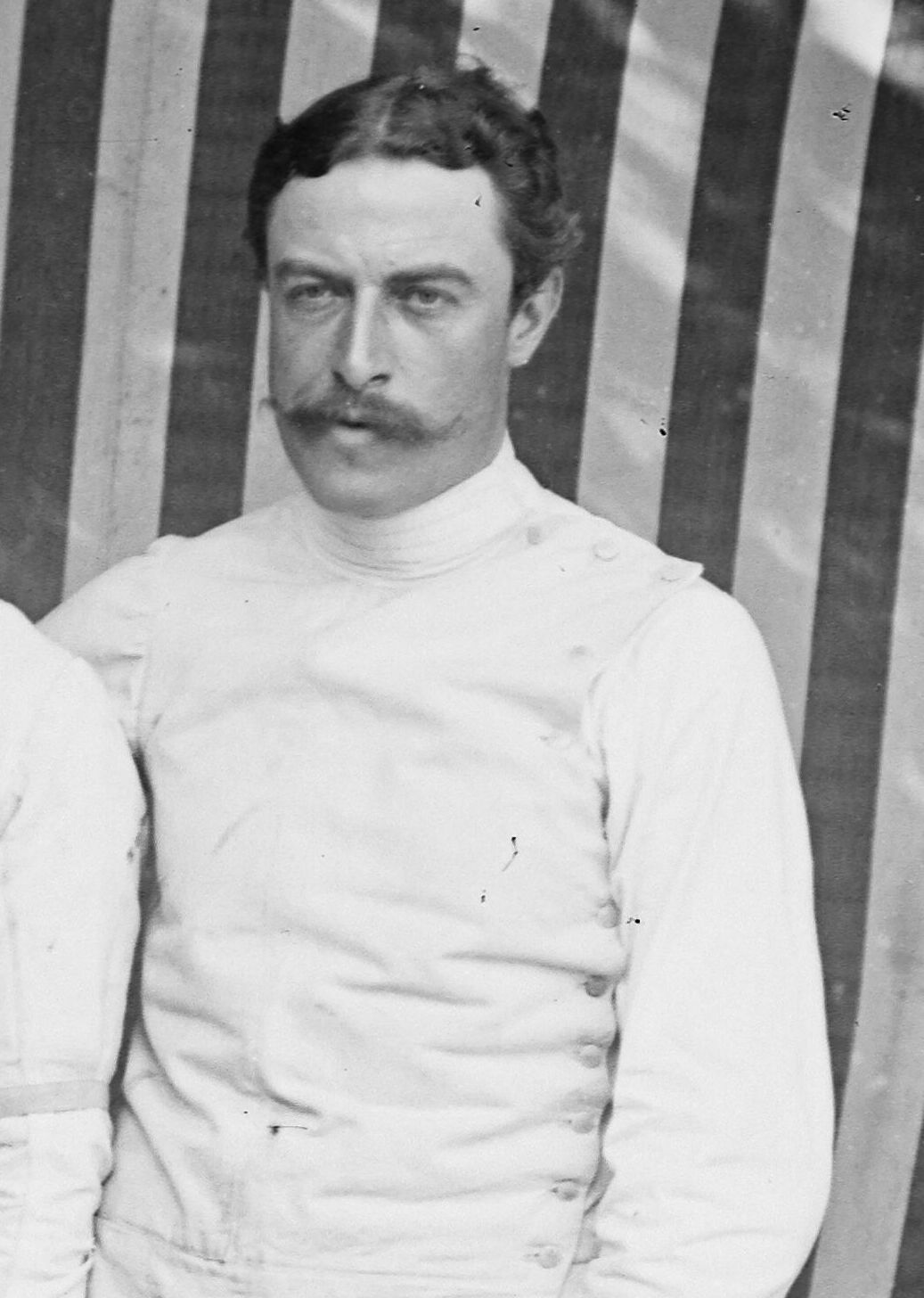
- François Rom in 1905

Personal information
- Born: 8 April 1882 Antwerp, Belgium
- Died: 2 February 1942 (aged 59)

Sport
- Sport: Fencing
Medal record
Men's fencing
Representing Belgium
Olympic Games
Bronze medal – third place	1908 London	Épée, team
Gold medal – first place	1912 Stockholm	Épée, team

François Rom (8 April 1882 – 2 February 1942) was a Belgian fencer. He won a bronze medal in the team épée event at the 1908 Summer Olympics.

== Olympic events ==
- 1908 Summer Olympics in London
  - Fencing – Épée, individual
  - Fencing – Épée, team – Bronze medal
- 1912 Summer Olympics in Stockholm
  - Fencing – Épée, team – Gold medal
