= Frantz Jørgensen =

Danish fencer

Personal information
- Born: 3 August 1881 Copenhagen, Denmark
- Died: 17 January 1973 (aged 91) Frederiksberg, Denmark

Sport
- Sport: Fencing

Frantz Jørgensen (3 August 1881 – 17 January 1973) was a Danish fencer. He competed in the individual épée event at the 1908 Summer Olympics.
