= Birger Cnattingius =

Swedish fencer

Personal information
- Born: 29 November 1875 Stockholm, Sweden
- Died: 19 February 1950 (aged 74) Stockholm, Sweden

Sport
- Sport: Fencing

Birger Cnattingius (29 November 1875 – 19 February 1950) was a Swedish fencer. He competed in the individual épée event at the 1908 Summer Olympics.
