= Ernst Moldenhauer =

German fencer

Sport
- Sport: Fencing

Ernst Moldenhauer was a German fencer. He competed in the individual épée and sabre events at the 1908 Summer Olympics.
