= Jacques Rodocanachi =

French fencer

Personal information
- Full name: Jacques Auguste Gérard Rodocanachi
- Nationality: French
- Born: 14 April 1882
- Died: 7 November 1925 (aged 43)

Sport
- Sport: Fencing; Shooting

Jacques Rodocanachi (14 April 1882 – 7 November 1925) was a French fencer. He competed in the individual épée event at the 1908 Summer Olympics. A French Army officer, he was also a pistol shooter. He was injured during World War I and left the Army after the war, to become a steel engraver.
