= Eugène Olivier =

French fencer

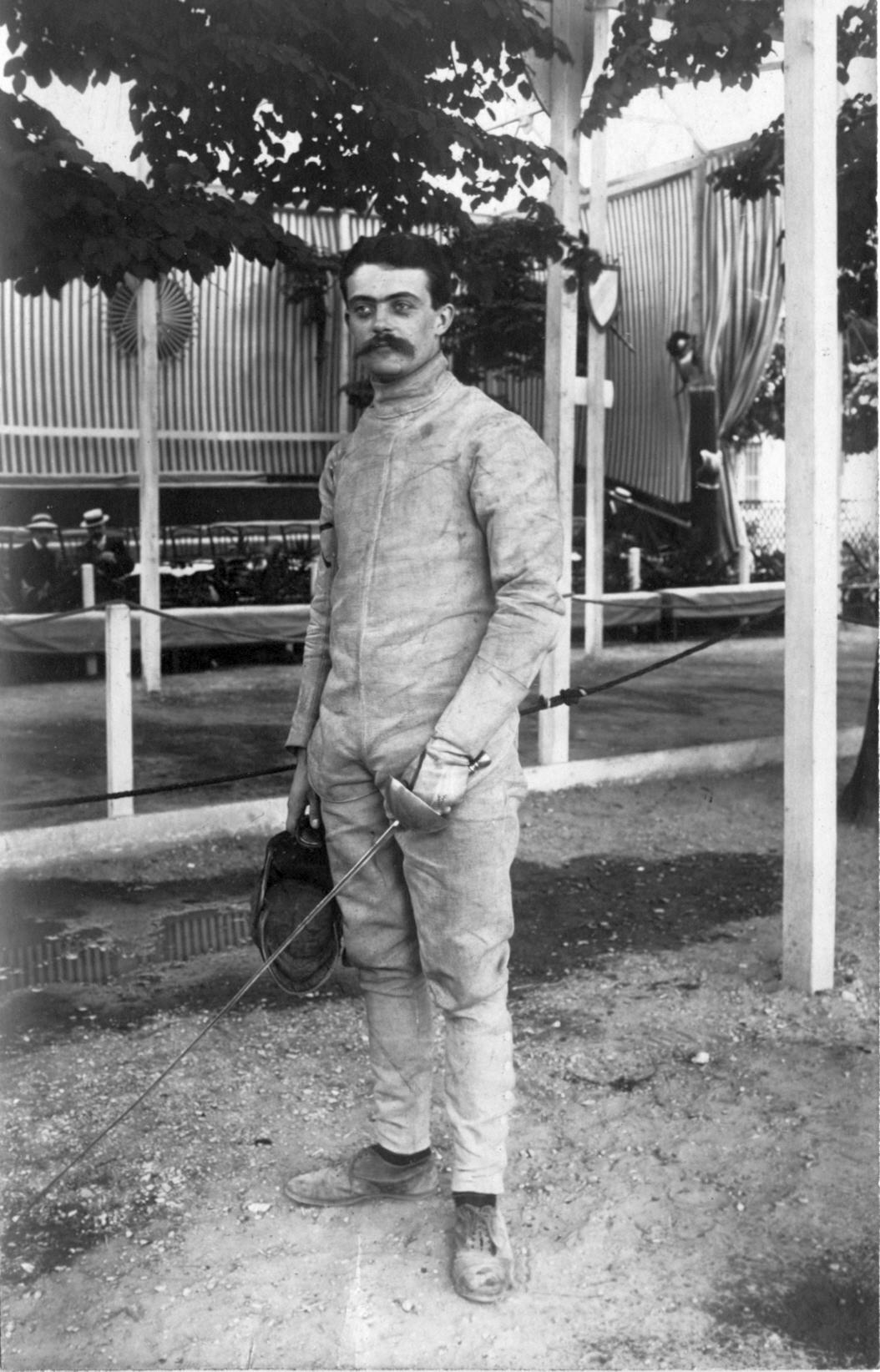

Medal record

Men's fencing

Representing France

Olympic Games
Gold medal – first place	1908 London	Team épée
Bronze medal – third place	London 1908	Individual épée

Eugène Olivier (17 September 1881 in Paris – 5 May 1964) was a French fencer, physician and university professor. He was a member of the French épée team and became an Olympic épée champion at the 1908 Summer Olympics in London.

== Career ==
Eugène Olivier was a Doctor of Science and Associate Professor of Anatomy. His father was also a physician. It was in his first year of non-resident medical studentship at the Hôpital Saint-Louis (1901) that Eugène Olivier started to acquire a grounding in surgery and anesthesia, under the supervision of professor Louis Ombrédanne. He later on became deputy director of the Paris Faculty of Medicine surgical clinic (in 1912). In 1913, his thesis on the Topographical anatomy and surgery of the thymus was rewarded with the Godart Prize by the Paris Faculty of Medicine and the National Academy of Medicine.

During World War I, he worked in a rehabilitation center and was appointed Chevalier de la Légion d'Honneur (Knight of the Legion of Honour) for military merits in 1919.

He became a Doctor of Science and Associate Professor at the Faculty of Medicine (in anatomy) in 1923, after defending a thesis on The relationships between the thymus' morphology and its arterial vascularization. Head of the Paris Faculty anatomical works in 1939, he taught as a Professor of Anatomy from 1946 to 1952, thus taking over the post from Professor Henri Rouvière. He was promoted Officier de la Légion d'Honneur (Officier of the Legion of Honour) by the Ministry of National Education (France) in 1939. He served as a medical expert for legal purposes and was a member of the Paris Society of Legal Medicine.

He published significant works in the medical branch, such as his Treatise on human osteology, Anatomy of the head and neck, Anatomy of the abdomen and Anatomy of the thorax. These influential anatomical works granted him a free membership to the National Surgery Academy in 1953.

He was the father of Gilbert Olivier, third president of the Fédération Sportive de France and director of the ESSEC Business School.
