= Victor Willems =

Belgian fencer

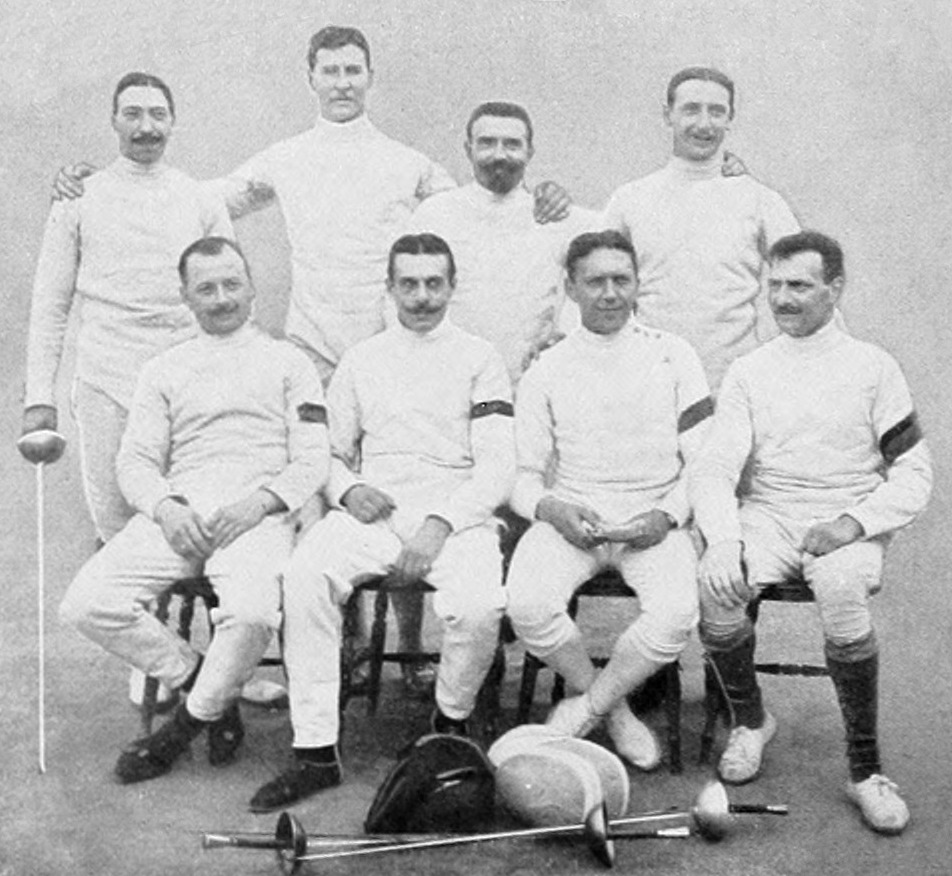

Personal information
- Born: 19 February 1877
- Died: 1920 (aged 42–43)

Sport
- Sport: Fencing
Medal record
Men's fencing
Representing Belgium
Olympic Games
Bronze medal – third place	1908 London	Épée, Team
Gold medal – first place	1912 Stockholm	Épée, Team

Victor Willems (19 February 1877 – 1920) was a Belgian fencer. He won a bronze medal in the team épée event at the 1908 Summer Olympics and a gold in the same event at the 1912 Summer Olympics.
