= Jean Stern (fencer) =

French fencer (1875–1962)

Personal information
- Full name: Léon Antoine Jean•Stern
- Nationality: French
- Born: 19 February 1875 Paris, France
- Died: 15 December 1962 (aged 87) Paris, France
- Spouse: Claude Lambert

Sport
- Sport: Fencing
- Event: épée
Medal record
Men's fencing
Representing France
Olympic Games
Gold medal – first place	1908 London	Team épée

Jean Stern (19 February 1875 – 15 December 1962) was a French Olympic champion épée fencer.

== Personal life ==
Stern was Jewish. He was born in Paris, the son of French banker Louis Stern (1840-1900). His father was the son of Antoine Jacob Stern, also well known in banking circles, and a scion of the wealthy Stern family of the AJ Stern & Co. banking house.

Jean Stern was also the cousin of composer Fernand Halphen, and nephew of actress Sophie Croizette. In 1904 Stern married Claude Lambert, daughter of Baron Léon Lambert and Baroness Zoe Lucie de Rothschild.

== Olympic fencing career ==
Stern competed with the French épée team at the 1908 Summer Olympics in London at 33 years of age. During the Games, the French team defeated Denmark (10-6), Great Britain (12-5), and Belgium (9-7), and won the gold medal. Stern also competed in the individual épée event, finishing in 12th place.

== See also ==
- List of Jewish fencers
- List of Jewish Olympic medalists
