= Gösta Olson =

Swedish gymnast and fencer

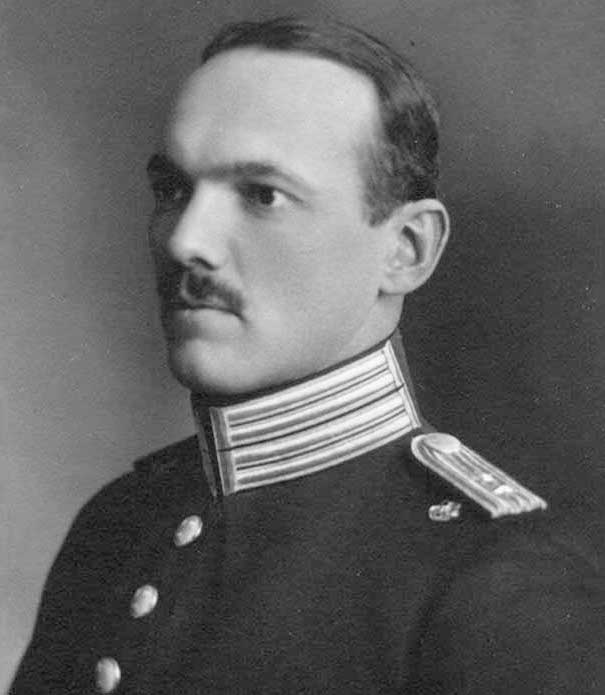
- Olson c. 1908

Personal information
- Full name: Gustaf Adolf Olson
- Born: 10 May 1883 Linköping, United Kingdoms of Sweden and Norway
- Died: 23 January 1966 (aged 82) Stockholm, Sweden

Gymnastics career
- Discipline: Men's artistic gymnastics
- Country represented: Sweden
- Club: Stockholms Gymnastikförening
Medal record
Men's artistic gymnastics
Representing Sweden
Olympic Games
Gold medal – first place	1908 London	Team

Gustaf Adolf "Gösta" Olson (10 May 1883 – 23 January 1966) was a Swedish gymnast and fencer who competed in the 1908 Summer Olympics. He was part of the Swedish gymnastics team that won the all-around gold medal, and was eliminated in the first round of the individual épée event. He was a member of the fencing club Föreningen för Fäktkonstens Främjande.

== See also ==
- Dual sport and multi-sport Olympians
