= Gaston Alibert =

French fencer (1878–1917)

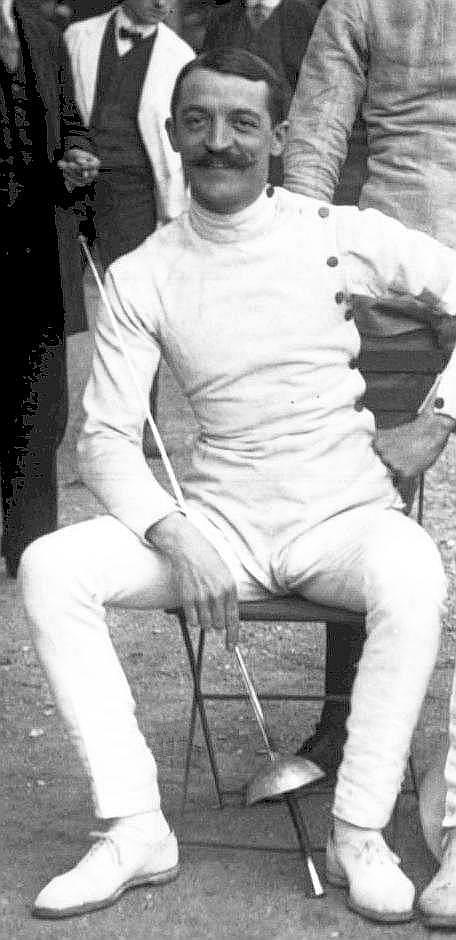
- Gaston Alibert (1908)

Medal record

Men's fencing

Representing France

Olympic Games
Gold medal – first place	1908 London	Épée individual
Gold medal – first place	1908 London	Épée team

Gaston Jules Louis Antoine Alibert (22 February 1878 in Paris – 26 December 1917 in Paris) was a French fencer and olympic champion in épée competition.

He received a gold medal in épée individual and a gold medal in épée team at the 1908 Summer Olympics in London. Eight years before, Alibert already participated in the 1900 Summer Olympics in Paris placing seventh in the épée individual event. He contracted tuberculosis while at the front in World War I and later died in 1917 aged 39.
