= Simon Okker =

Dutch fencer (1881–1944)

Personal information
- Born: 1 June 1881 Amsterdam, Netherlands
- Died: 6 March 1944 (aged 62) Auschwitz-Birkenau, German-occupied Poland

Sport
- Sport: Fencing
- Event(s): epee and foil

Simon Okker (1 June 1881 – 6 March 1944) was a Dutch Olympic epee and foil fencer, who was killed in the Auschwitz concentration camp.

== Biography ==
Okker was Jewish, and was born in Amsterdam, Netherlands. He participated in the 1906 Intercalated Games in Athens, Greece, coming in 5th, and in the 1908 Summer Olympics in London, England.

Okker was killed by the Nazis in the Auschwitz concentration camp in 1944.

His grandson Tom Okker became a successful tennis player.
