= Guillaume Coeckelberg =

Belgian cyclist

Personal information
- Born: 7 September 1885 Brussels, Belgium
- Died: 24 April 1953 (aged 67)

Cycling career
- Sport: Cycling

Guillaume Coeckelberg (7 September 1885 – 24 April 1953) was a Belgian cyclist. He competed in two events at the 1908 Summer Olympics.
