= Senohraby =

- Municipality
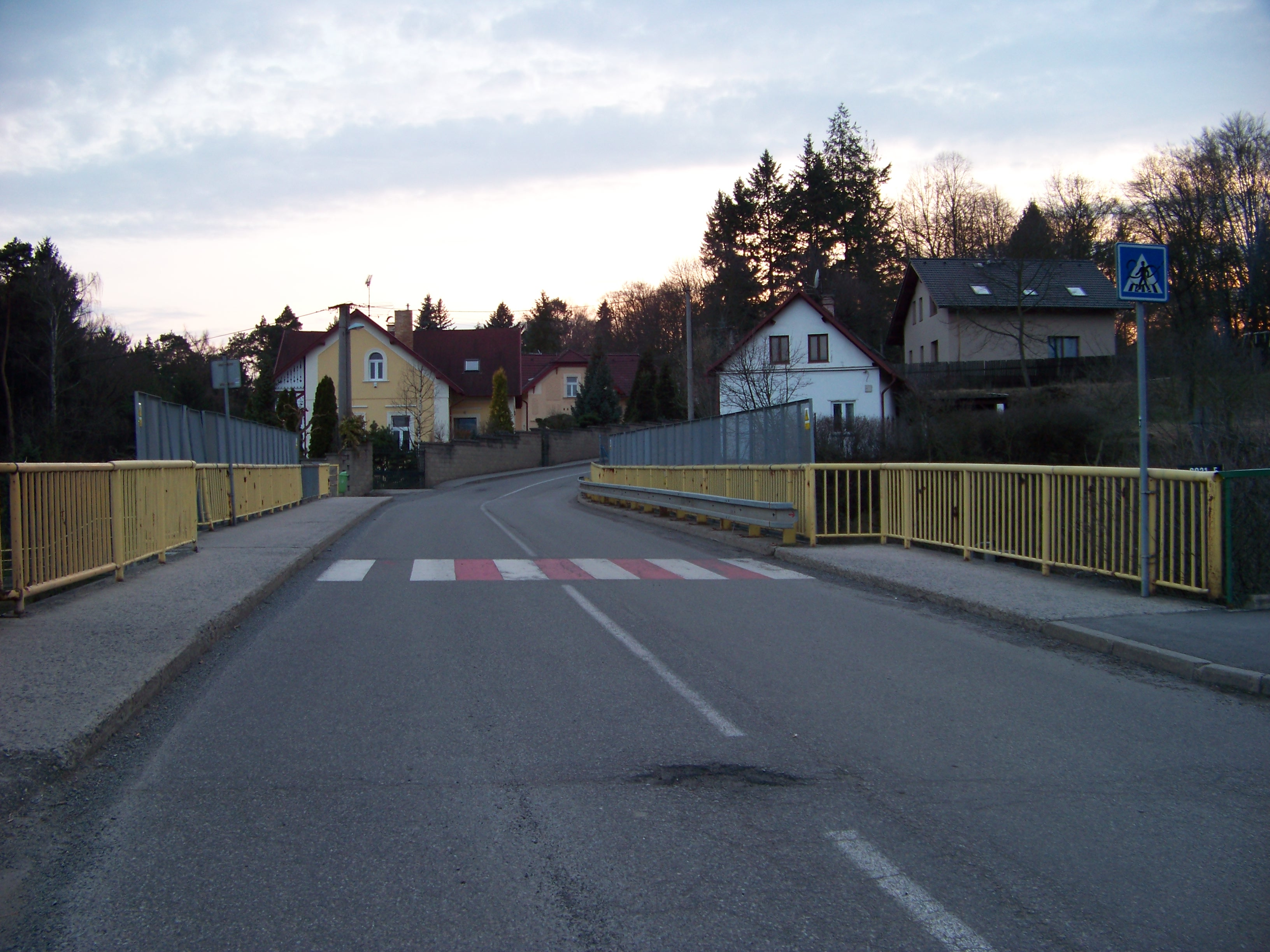
- Bridge in Senohraby

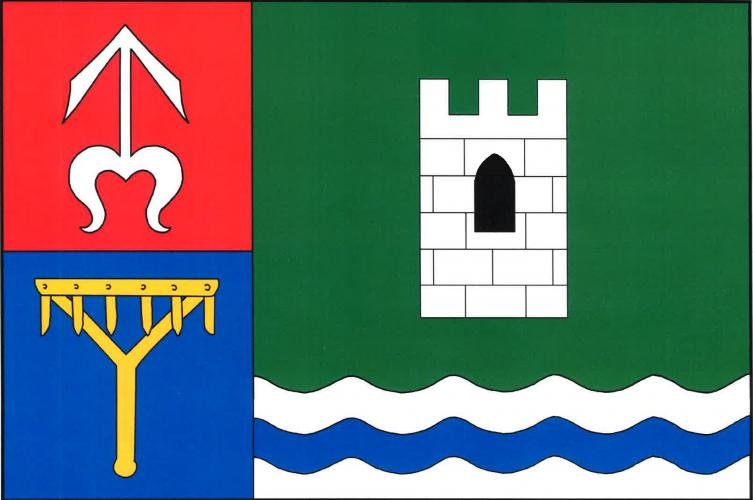
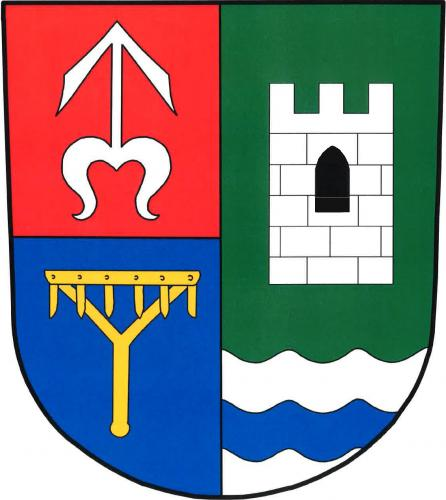
- Flag Coat of arms

- Location in the Czech Republic
- Coordinates: 49°53′44″N 14°43′5″E
- Country: Czech Republic
- Region: Central Bohemian
- District: Prague-East
- First mentioned: 1444

Area
  - Total: 3.44 km^{2} (1.33 sq mi)
- Elevation: 363 m (1,191 ft)

Population (2026-01-01)
  - Total: 1,404
  - Density: 408/km^{2} (1,060/sq mi)
- Time zone: UTC+1 (CET)
  - Summer (DST): UTC+2 (CEST)
- Postal code: 251 66
- Website: www.senohraby.cz

Senohraby is a municipality and village in Prague-East District in the Central Bohemian Region of the Czech Republic. It has about 1,400 inhabitants.

== Demographics ==
Historical population
| Year | Pop. | ±% |
|---|---|---|
| 1869 | 333 | — |
| 1880 | 272 | −18.3% |
| 1890 | 272 | +0.0% |
| 1900 | 266 | −2.2% |
| 1910 | 284 | +6.8% |
| 1921 | 448 | +57.7% |
| 1930 | 539 | +20.3% |
| 1950 | 794 | +47.3% |
| 1961 | 1,008 | +27.0% |
| 1970 | 926 | −8.1% |
| 1980 | 934 | +0.9% |
| 1991 | 948 | +1.5% |
| 2001 | 914 | −3.6% |
| 2011 | 1,158 | +26.7% |
| 2021 | 1,309 | +13.0% |
Source: Censuses
