= Alexandre Simonson =

Belgian fencer

Personal information
- Born: 20 April 1872 Brussels, Belgium
- Died: 29 June 1932 (aged 60) Ixelles, Belgium

Sport
- Sport: Fencing

Alexandre Simonson (20 April 1872 – 29 June 1932) was a Belgian fencer. He competed at the 1908 and 1920 Summer Olympics.
