= Lauritz Christian Østrup =

Danish fencer

Personal information
- Born: 6 June 1881 Copenhagen, Denmark
- Died: 21 May 1940 (aged 58) Copenhagen, Denmark

Sport
- Sport: Fencing

Lauritz Christian Østrup (6 June 1881 – 21 May 1940) was a Danish fencer. He competed at the 1908 and 1912 Summer Olympics.
