= Herbert Sander =

Danish fencer (1879–1947)

Personal information
- Born: 21 August 1879 Frederiksberg, Denmark
- Died: 18 November 1947 (aged 68) Copenhagen, Denmark

Sport
- Sport: Fencing

Herbert Sander (21 August 1879 – 18 November 1947) was a Danish fencer. He competed at the 1906 and 1908 Summer Olympics.
