= Étienne Grade =

Belgian fencer

Personal information
- Born: 12 March 1875
- Died: Unknown

Sport
- Sport: Fencing

Étienne Grade (born 12 March 1875, date of death unknown) was a Belgian fencer. He competed in the individual and team sabre events at the 1908 Summer Olympics.
