= Albert Sarens =

Belgian fencer (1878–1922)

Personal information
- Full name: Albert Henri Louis Auguste Florent Emmanuel Sarens
- Born: 25 December 1878 Brussels, Belgium
- Died: 26 November 1922 (aged 43) Brussels, Belgium

Sport
- Sport: Fencing

Albert Sarens (25 December 1878 – 26 November 1922) was a Belgian fencer. He competed in the individual épée event at the 1908 Summer Olympics.
