= Johannes Adam =

German fencer

Personal information
- Born: 1871

Sport
- Sport: Fencing

Johannes Adam (born 1871, date of death unknown) was a German fencer. He competed at the 1908 and 1912 Summer Olympics.
