= François Stuyck =

Belgian fencer

Personal information
- Born: September 5, 1887 Antwerp, Belgium
- Died: March 5, 1960 (aged 72) Antwerp, Belgium

Sport
- Country: Belgium
- Sport: Fencing

François Stuyck, also known as Fernand Stuyck, was a Belgian fencer. He competed in the individual épée event at the 1908 Summer Olympics. During this event, François lost five matches and won one match, advancing to the quarterfinals. François was also a businessman.
