= Charles Collignon (fencer) =

French fencer (1877–1925)

Medal record

Men's fencing

Representing France

Olympic Games
| Gold medal – first place | 1908 London | Team épée |

Charles Collignon (7 September 1877 in Paris - 19 July 1925) was a French fencer and Olympic champion in épée competition.

He received a gold medal in épée team at the 1908 Summer Olympics in London.
