= Leaf Daniell =

British fencer (1877–1913)

Personal information
- Born: 1877 Tooting, London, England
- Died: 28 February 1913 (aged 35–36) Eddleston, Scottish Borders, Scotland

Sport
- Sport: Fencing
Medal record
Men's fencing
Representing United Kingdom
Olympic Games
| Silver medal – second place | 1908 London | Épée, team |

Cyrus Leaf Daniell (1877 – 28 February 1913) was a British fencer. He won a silver medal in the team épée event at the 1908 Summer Olympics. In 1908, he won the épée title at the British Fencing Championships.
