= Fernand Bosmans =

Belgian fencer (1883–1960)

Personal information
- Born: 29 June 1883 Antwerp, Belgium
- Died: 30 July 1960 (aged 77)

Sport
- Sport: Fencing
Medal record
Men's fencing
Representing Belgium
Olympic Games
Bronze medal – third place	1908 London	Épée, Team

Fernand Bosmans (29 June 1883 – 30 July 1960) was a Belgian fencer. He won a bronze medal in the team épée event at the 1908 Summer Olympics.
