= Robert Krünert =

German fencer

Personal information
- Born: 14 April 1866 Berlin, Kingdom of Prussia
- Died: 16 June 1945 (aged 79) Berlin, Allied-occupied Germany

Sport
- Sport: Fencing

Robert Krünert (14 April 1866 – 16 June 1945) was a German fencer. He competed at the 1906 and 1908 Summer Olympics.
