= Pierre le Blon =

Belgian fencer (1886–1958)

Paul le Blon
Personal information
- Full name: Paul Auguste Hubert le Blon
- Born: 9 February 1886 Lessines, Belgium
- Died: 24 October 1958 (aged 72) Antwerp, Belgium

Sport
- Sport: Fencing

Paul le Blon (9 February 1886 – 24 October 1958) was a Belgian fencer. He competed in the individual épée event at the 1908 Summer Olympics.
