= Joseph Van der Voodt =

Belgian fencer

Sport
- Sport: Fencing

Joseph Van der Voodt was a Belgian fencer. He competed in the individual and team sabre events at the 1908 Summer Olympics.
