= Désiré Beaurain =

Belgian fencer (1881–1963)

Personal information
- Born: 2 September 1881 Berchem, Belgium
- Died: 24 October 1963 (aged 82) Schoten, Belgium

Sport
- Sport: Fencing
Medal record
Men's fencing
Representing Belgium
Olympic Games
Bronze medal – third place	1908 London	Épée, team
Silver medal – second place	1924 Paris	Foil, team

Désiré Beaurain (2 September 1881 – 24 October 1963) was a Belgian fencer. He won a bronze medal at the 1908 Summer Olympics and a silver medal at the 1924 Summer Olympics.
