= Robert Quennessen =

French fencer

Personal information
- Born: 17 February 1888
- Died: 18 June 1940 (aged 52)

Sport
- Sport: Fencing

Robert Quennessen (17 February 1888 – 18 June 1940) was a French fencer. He competed in the individual épée event at the 1908 Summer Olympics.
