= Cecil Haig =

British fencer (1862–1947)

Personal information
- Born: 16 March 1862 Kensington, London, England
- Died: 3 March 1947 (aged 84) Monnington on Wye, Herefordshire, England

Sport
- Sport: Fencing
Medal record
Men's fencing
Representing Great Britain
Olympic Games
Silver medal – second place	1908 London	Épée, team

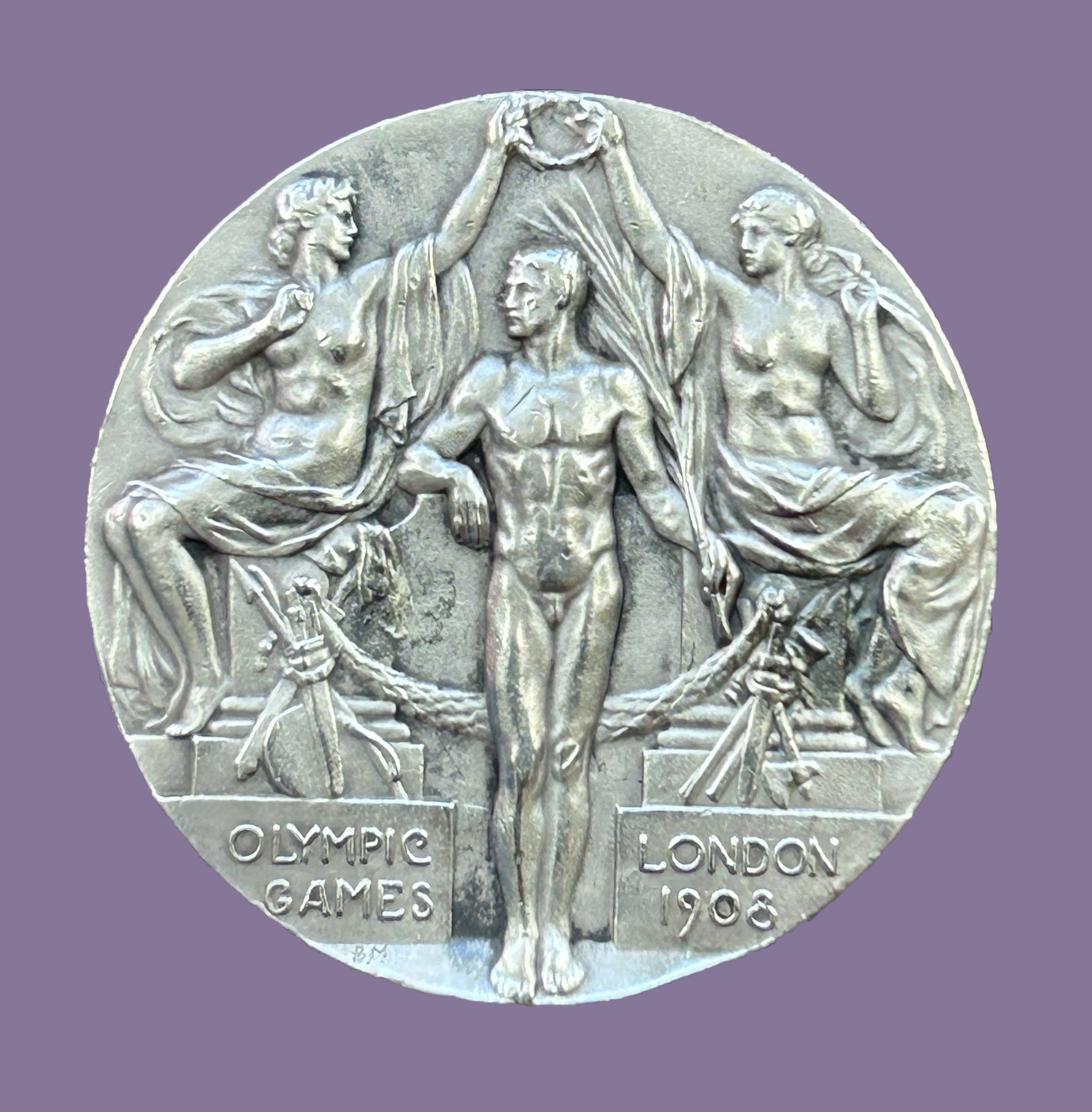
Olympic Silver Medal 1908 - The edge reads " United Kingdom. Second Prize -Epée Teams Cecil H. Haig"

Cecil Haig (16 March 1862 – 3 March 1947) was a British fencer. He won a silver medal in the team épée event at the 1908 Summer Olympics. He was educated at Clifton College and Gonville and Caius College, Cambridge.
