= Martin Holt =

British fencer (1881–1956)

Personal information
- Born: 13 January 1881 London, England
- Died: 2 November 1956 (aged 75) Bognor Regis, West Sussex, England

Sport
- Sport: Fencing
Medal record
Men's fencing
Representing United Kingdom
Olympic Games
Silver medal – second place	1908 London	Épée, team
Silver medal – second place	1912 Stockholm	Épée, team

Martin Drummond Vesey Holt (13 January 1881 – 2 November 1956) was a British fencer. He won two silver medals in the team épée competitions at the 1908 and 1912 Summer Olympics. In 1920 and 1923, he won the épée title at the British Fencing Championships.

== See also ==
- List of athletes with the most appearances at Olympic Games
