= Pontus von Rosen =

Swedish fencer

Personal information
- Full name: Pontus Robert Conrad von Rosen
- Born: 21 November 1881 Stockholm, Sweden
- Died: 11 January 1951 (aged 69) Stockholm, Sweden

Sport
- Sport: Fencing

Pontus Robert Conrad von Rosen (21 November 1881 – 11 January 1951) was a Swedish fencer. He competed at the 1908 and 1912 Summer Olympics.
