= Georg Stöhr =

German fencer

Personal information
- Born: 21 May 1885 Offenbach am Main, German Empire
- Died: 29 March 1977 (aged 91) Offenbach am Main, West Germany

Sport
- Sport: Fencing

Georg Stöhr (21 May 1885 – 29 March 1977) was a German fencer. He competed at the 1908 and 1912 Summer Olympics.
