= Alfred Labouchere =

Dutch fencer (1867–1953)

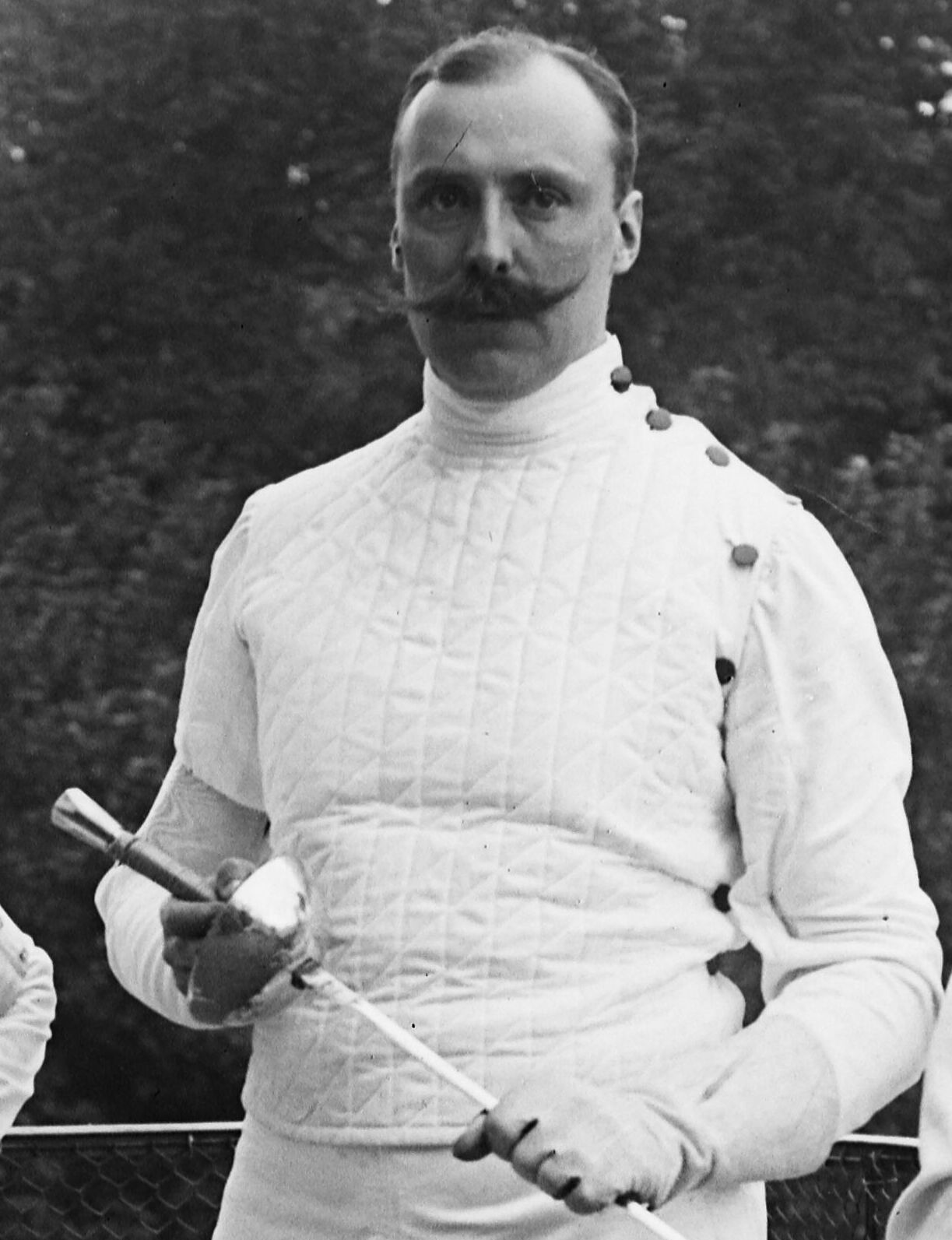

Personal information
- Born: 19 January 1867 Amsterdam, Netherlands
- Died: 24 January 1953 (aged 86) Zeist, Netherlands

Sport
- Sport: Fencing

Alfred Labouchere (19 January 1867 – 24 January 1953) was a Dutch épée and sabre fencer. He competed at the 1908 and 1928 Summer Olympics.
