= Robert Montgomerie (fencer) =

British fencer (1880–1939)

Personal information
- Born: 15 February 1880 South Kensington, London, England
- Died: 28 April 1939 (aged 59) Westminster, London, England
- Education: Worcester College, Oxford

Sport
- Sport: Fencing
Medal record
Men's fencing
Representing United Kingdom
Olympic Games
Silver medal – second place	1908 London	Épée, team
Silver medal – second place	1912 Stockholm	Épée, team

Robert Cecil Lindsay Montgomerie (15 February 1880 – 28 April 1939) was a British fencer. He won two silver medals in the team épée competitions at the 1908 and 1912 Summer Olympics. Montgomerie also competed in the Olympic Games of 1920, 1924 and 1928. He was a nine-time British fencing champion, winning four foil titles and five épée titles at the British Fencing Championships from 1905 to 1914. He was the first British fencer to win an overseas open épée competition, taking first place at Le Touquet in 1913. From 1907 to 1927, he served as the honorary secretary of the Amateur Fencing Association.

Montgomerie attended Worcester College, Oxford. As an amateur fencer, he followed in his father's footsteps to become a barrister.
