= Herman Georges Berger =

French fencer (1875–1924)

Medal record

Men's fencing

Representing France

Olympic Games
Gold medal – first place	1908 London	Épée team

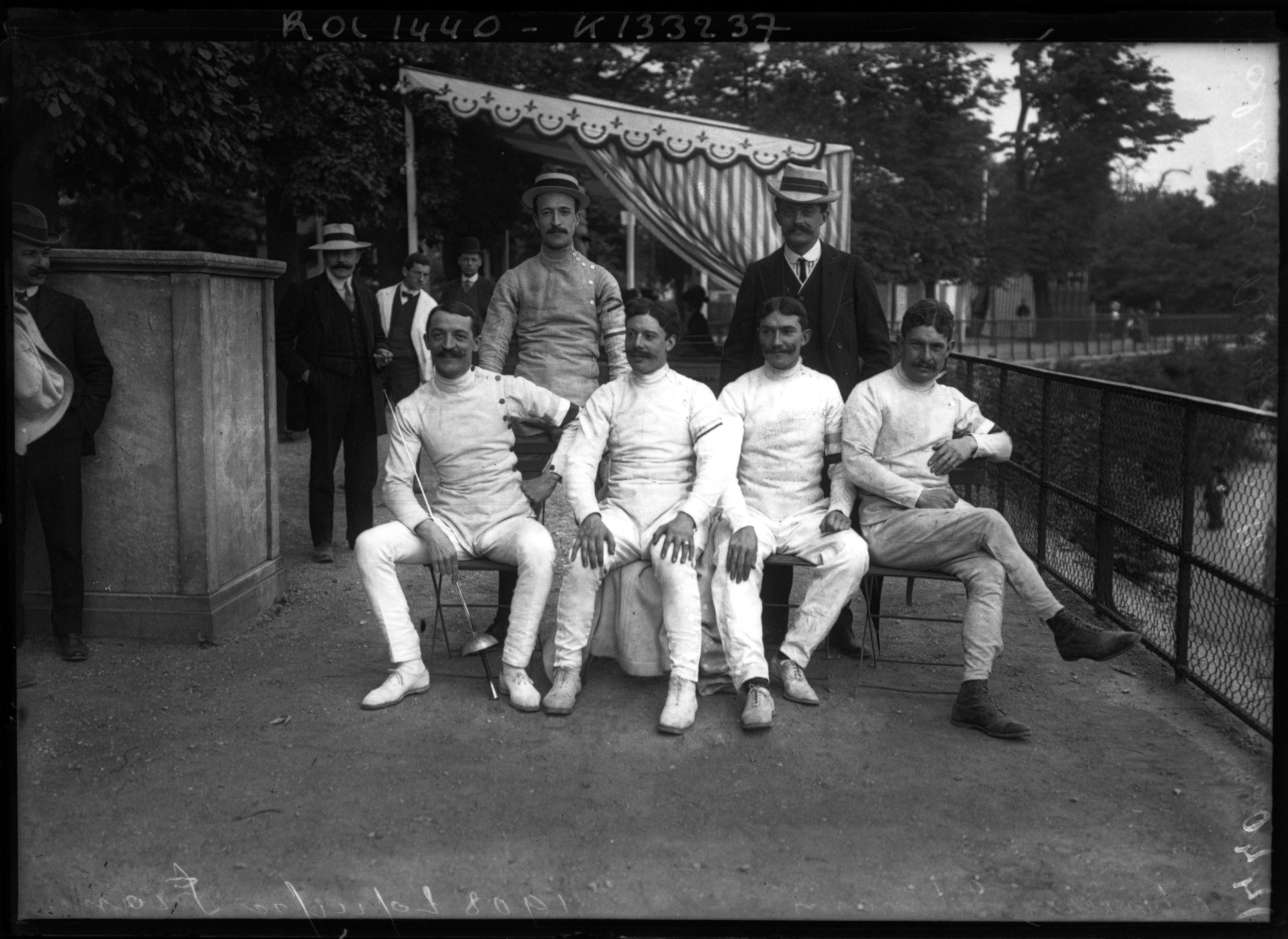

Herman Georges Berger (1 August 1875 in Bassens – 13 January 1924 in Nice) was a French épée and foil fencer and Olympic champion in épée competition.

He received a gold medal in épée team at the 1908 Summer Olympics in London.
