= André du Bosch =

Belgian fencer

Alexis du Bosch
Personal information
- Full name: Alexandre Grégoire Georges Philippe du Bosch
- Born: 12 August 1871 Ixelles, Belgium
- Died: Unknown

Sport
- Sport: Fencing

Alexis du Bosch (born 12 August 1871) was a Belgian fencer. He competed in the individual and team sabre events at the 1908 Summer Olympics.
