= Péter Tóth (fencer) =

Hungarian fencer (1882–1967)

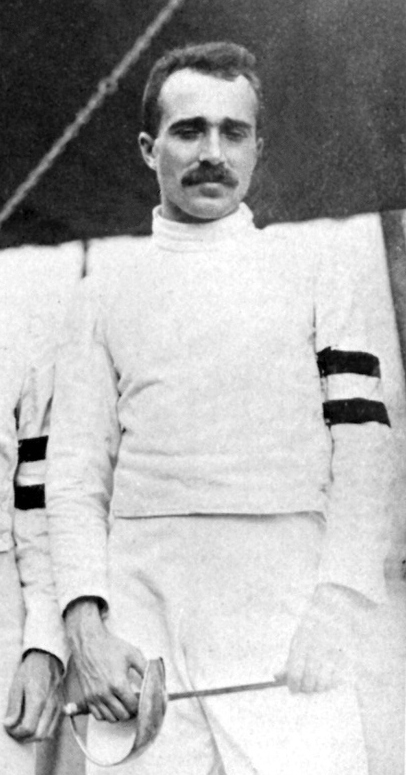
- Tóth at the 1908 Olympics

Personal information
- Born: 12 July 1882 Budapest, Kingdom of Hungary
- Died: 28 February 1967 (aged 84) Budapest, Hungary

Sport
- Sport: Fencing
- Event(s): Sabre; Foil
- Club: Magyar AC
Medal record
Representing Hungary
Olympic Games
| Gold medal – first place | 1908 London | Team sabre |
| Gold medal – first place | 1912 Stockholm | Team sabre |
Intercalated Games
| Bronze medal – third place | 1906 Athens | Three hits |

Dr. Péter Tóth (12 July 1882 – 28 February 1967) was a Hungarian fencer who competed at the 1906 Intercalated Games and the 1908, 1912 and 1928 Olympics. He won team gold medals in sabre in 1908 and 1912, finishing fifth-sixth individually; he won an individual bronze medal in the sabre three hits event in 1906. In 1928, he placed fifth in the team foil. Domestically, Tóth won 17 Hungarian foil and sabre titles between 1907 and 1934 and competed until 1937.

Tóth was a founding member of Fédération Internationale d'Escrime in 1913. He died in Budapest, aged 84, after being hit by a truck.
