= Ferdinand Feyerick =

Belgian fencer

Personal information
- Born: 27 January 1865 Ghent, Belgium
- Died: 12 September 1920 (aged 55) Ghent, Belgium

Sport
- Sport: Fencing
Medal record
Men's fencing
Representing Belgium
Olympic Games
Bronze medal – third place	1908 London	Épée, Team

Ferdinand Feyerick (27 January 1865 – 12 September 1920) was a Belgian fencer. He won a bronze medal in the team épée event at the 1908 Summer Olympics.
