= Vilém Tvrzský =

Czech fencer

Personal information
- Born: 20 March 1880 Geneva, Switzerland
- Died: 1 February 1943 (aged 62) Prague

Sport
- Sport: Fencing

Vilém Tvrzský (1880 – 1943) was a fencer. He competed for Bohemia at the 1908 and 1912 Summer Olympics and for Czechoslovakia at the 1920 Summer Olympics.
