= Vilém Goppold von Lobsdorf =

Czech fencer (1869–1943)

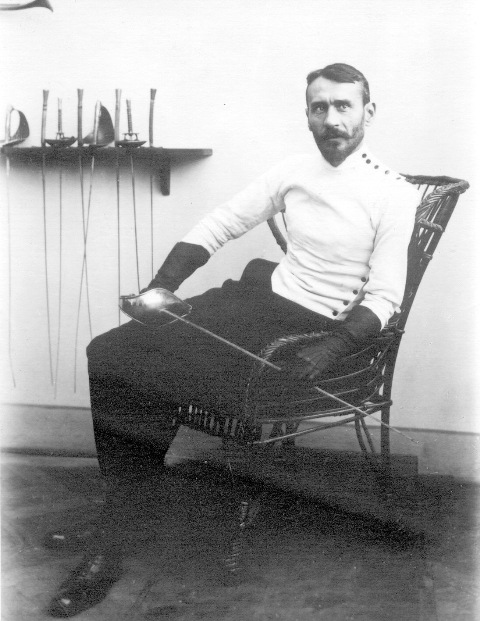

Personal information
- Born: 27 May 1869 Prague, Bohemia, Austria-Hungary
- Died: 12 June 1943 (aged 74) Prague, Protectorate of Bohemia and Moravia

Sport
- Sport: Fencing
Medal record
Representing Bohemia
Bronze medal – third place	1908 London	Sabre Individual
Bronze medal – third place	1908 London	Sabre Team

Vilém Goppold von Lobsdorf (25 May 1869 – 15 June 1943) was a Czech fencer and Olympic medalist in sabre competition. Representing Bohemia, he won bronze medals in sabre individual and in sabre team at the 1908 Summer Olympics in London.

Vilém Goppold von Lobsdorf died on 15 June 1943 in Prague. He is buried at the Olšany Cemetery in Prague.
