= Marcel Van Langenhove (fencer) =

Belgian fencer

Sport
- Sport: Fencing

Marcel Van Langenhove (17 February 1888 – 4 July 1939) was a Belgian fencer. He competed in the individual épée event at the 1908 Summer Olympics.
