= Jakob Erckrath de Bary =

German fencer

Personal information
- Born: 10 March 1864 Offenbach am Main, Grand Duchy of Hesse
- Died: 14 August 1938 (aged 74) Seligenstadt, Germany

Sport
- Sport: Fencing
Medal record
Men's fencing
Representing Germany
Intercalated Games
Gold medal – first place	1906 Athens	Sabre, Team

Jakob Erckrath de Bary (10 March 1864 – 14 August 1938) was a German fencer. He won a gold medal in the team sabre event at the 1906 Intercalated Games.
