= Abelardo Olivier =

Italian fencer (1877–1951)

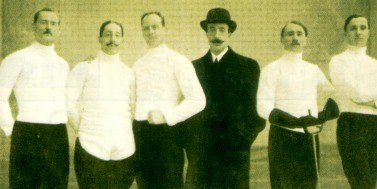
- Abelardo Olivier (first from left)

Personal information
- Born: 9 November 1877 Portogruaro, Italy
- Died: 24 January 1954 (aged 76) Milan, Italy

Sport
- Sport: Fencing
Medal record
Men's fencing
Representing Italy
Olympic Games
Silver medal – second place	1908 London	Sabre, Team
Gold medal – first place	1920 Antwerp	Foil, Team
Gold medal – first place	1920 Antwerp	Épée, Team

Abelardo Olivier (9 November 1877 – 24 January 1951) was an Italian fencer. He won a silver medal at the 1908 Summer Olympics and two golds at the 1920 Summer Olympics.
