= Otakar Lada =

Czech fencer

Personal information
- Born: 22 May 1883 Prague, Bohemia, Austria-Hungary
- Died: 12 July 1956 (aged 73) Senohraby, Czechoslovakia

Sport
- Sport: Fencing
Medal record
Men's fencing
Representing Bohemia
Olympic Games
Bronze medal – third place	1908 London	Sabre, Team

Otakar Lada (22 May 1883 – 12 July 1956) was a Czech fencer. He represented Bohemia at the 1908 Summer Olympics and won a bronze medal in the team sabre event.
