= Alessandro Pirzio Biroli =

Italian army general

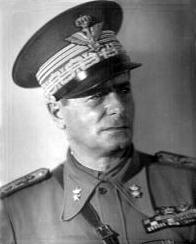

Personal information
- Born: 23 July 1877 Campobasso, Kingdom of Italy
- Died: 20 May 1962 (aged 84) Rome, Italy

Sport
- Sport: Fencing
Medal record
Men's fencing
Representing Italy
Olympic Games
Silver medal – second place	1908 London	Sabre, Team

Alessandro Pirzio Biroli (23 July 1877 – 20 May 1962) was an Italian fencer and army General.

== Biography ==
Biroli won a silver medal competing in the team sabre event at the 1908 Summer Olympics.

During the First World War Biroli fought in the Macedonian Front as commander of one battalion of Italian Army who was decorated by the Government of the Kingdom of Serbia with the Order of the White Eagle with swords. In 1918 Pirzio Biroli became the commanding officer for the 8th Bersaglieri Regiment. Between 1921 and 1927, he headed a military mission to Ecuador. He was commanding general of the Monte Nero Division from 1932 to 1933, and of the Italian V Trieste Corps from 1933 to 1935. He commanded the Eritrean Corps in the Second Italo-Abyssinian War, and subsequently was Governor of Amhara province in Italian East Africa from 1936 to 1937. Biroli was not fascist (but did partake in fascist war crimes). Pirzio Biroli was made General of the Italian 9th Army in 1941 and served as Governor of Montenegro from 1941 to 1943.

After the outbreak of the Uprising in Montenegro, Pirzio was appointed by Mussolini with complete civil and military powers in Montenegro on 25 July 1941 and as governor of Montenegro in October 1941. Even before his formally given his powers, Biroli was in charge of suppressing the uprising, and on 15 July he told his troops to suppress the uprising 'with maximum severity, but without unnecessary reprisals'. The uprising was suppressed after significant usage of violence against both guerrilla fighters and civilian population. As recipient of the Serbian order he was considered a suitable person for cooperation with Chetniks to whom he might be presented as their former ally from a previous war. In his speech held on 7 November 1942 in Kolašin, the Chetnik commander Pavle Đurišić greeted Biroli as a great friend of the Serbs and emphasized that the people of Montenegro were very lucky that Biroli came to them at a time when they were in a very difficult position. As early as 1941, Pirzio Biroli considered creating of an collaborationist committee, which would gather all notable collaborators in Montenegro against Communist Partisans. Because of opposition from Italian Ministry of Foreign Affairs, creation was delayed until July 24, 1942, when former Ban of Zeta Banovina Blažo Đukanović signed a deal with Pirzio Biroli to head Central Nationalist Committee. Pirzio Biroli's brother married the daughter of Ulrich von Hassell, a member of the German Resistance against German dictator Adolf Hitler.

According to Yugoslav historian Pajović, Pirzio Biroli was personally responsible for numerous executions and mass terror of the population of Montenegro. Despite being very high on the list of war criminals of the United Nations War Crimes Commission, Pirzio Biroli was never tried and spent his old age in Rome.

== Sources ==
- Pajović, Radoje (1987). Pavle Đurišić (in Serbo-Croatian). Zagreb, Yugoslavia: Centar za informacije i publicitet. ISBN 978-86-7125-006-1.
- Živković, Milutin (2017). Санџак 1941-1943 [Sanžak 1941-1943] (in Serbo-Croatian). Belgrade: University of Belgrade.
