= Sante Ceccherini =

Italian fencer (1863–1932)

Personal information
- Born: 15 November 1863 Incisa in Val d'Arno, Italy
- Died: 9 August 1932 (aged 68)

Sport
- Sport: Fencing
Medal record
Men's fencing
Representing Italy
Olympic Games
Silver medal – second place	1908 London	Sabre, Team

Sante Ceccherini (15 November 1863 – 9 August 1932) was an Italian fencer and military officer. He won a silver medal in the team sabre event at the 1908 Summer Olympics.

Commissioned as a second lieutenant in 1884, Ceccherini served in the infantry, and took part in the Italo-Ethiopian War of 1887–1889, the Italo-Turkish War and the First World War. He led the 3rd Bersaglieri Brigade in the great defeat at the Battle of Caporetto, and the final Italian victory in the Battle of Vittorio Veneto. After leaving command at the end of the war, he took part in Gabriele d'Annunzio's occupation of Fiume, and after returning to Italy, he joined the National Fascist Party. He was promoted to divisional general in 1923.
