= Jaroslav Tuček =

Czech fencer

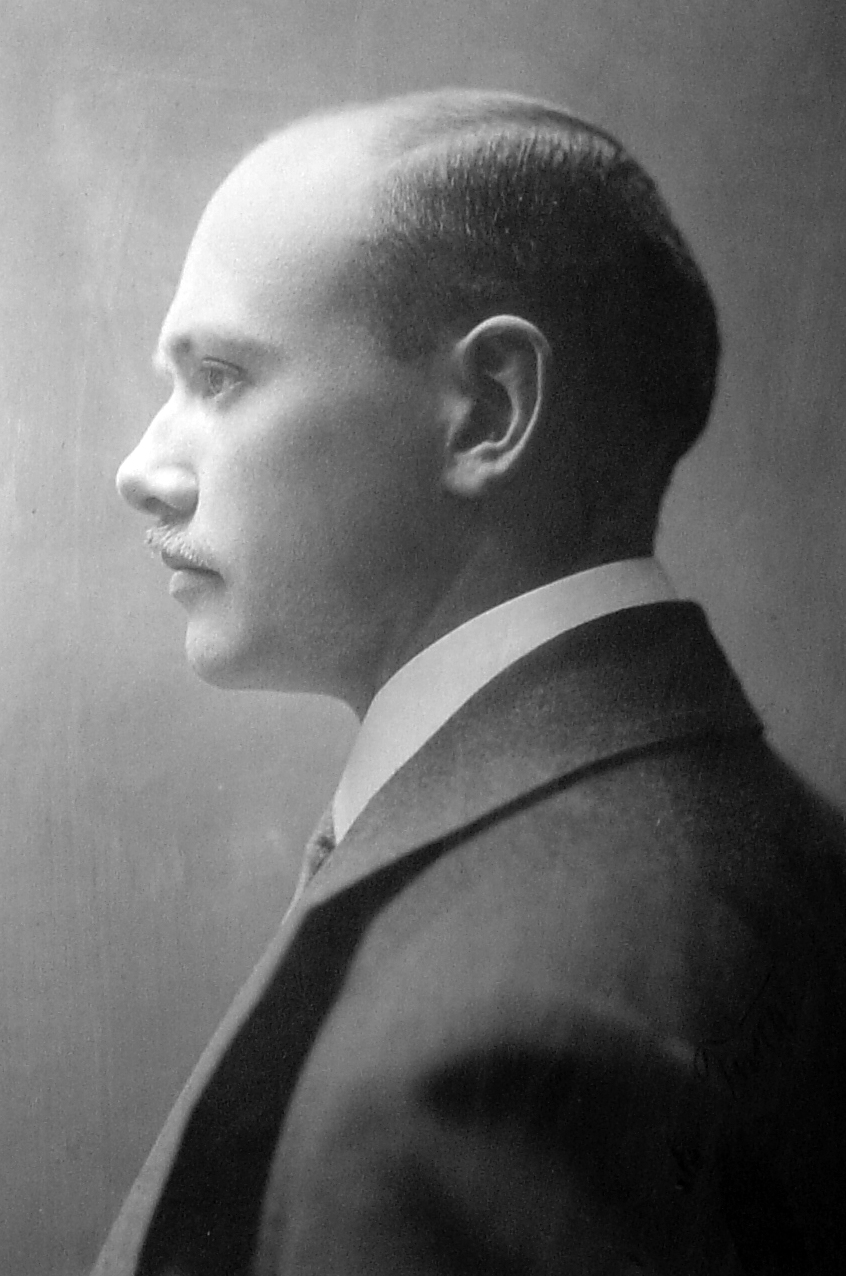
- Jaroslav Tuček

Personal information
- Born: 24 August 1882 Prague

Sport
- Sport: Fencing
Medal record
Men's fencing
Representing Bohemia
Olympic Games
Bronze medal – third place	1908 London	Sabre, Team

Jaroslav Tuček (born 24 August 1882, date of death unknown) was a Bohemian fencer. He won a bronze medal in the team sabre event at the 1908 Summer Olympics.

He authored the book about the history of fencing Pražští šermíři a mistři šermu (Prague 1927).
