= Jetze Doorman =

Dutch fencer (1881–1931)

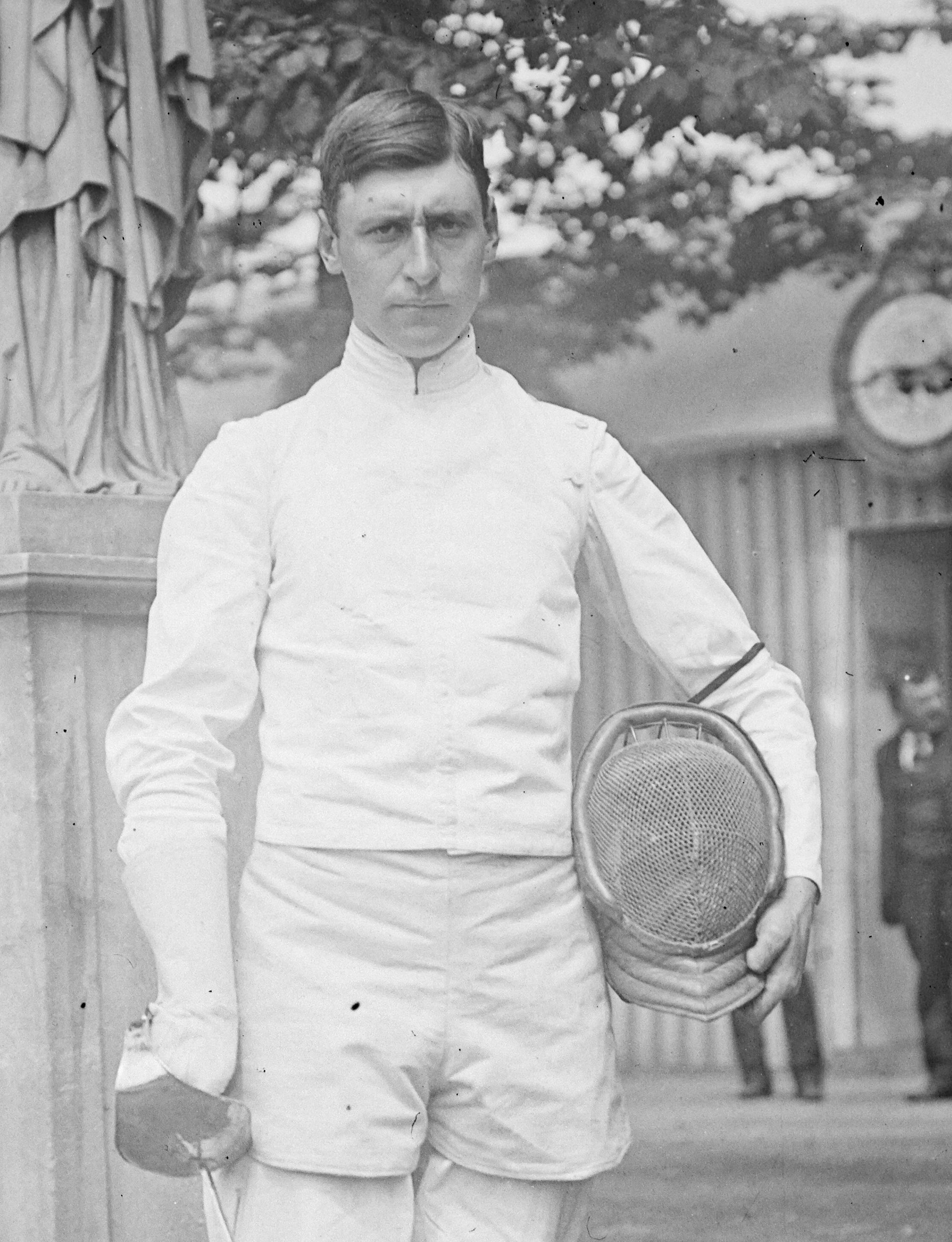
- Jetze Doorman in 1907

Personal information
- Born: 2 July 1881 Balk, Netherlands
- Died: 28 February 1931 (aged 49) Breda, Netherlands

Sport
- Sport: Fencing, modern pentathlon
Medal record
Men's fencing
Representing Netherlands
Olympic Games
| Bronze medal – third place | 1912 Stockholm | Épée, team |
| Bronze medal – third place | 1912 Stockholm | Sabre, team |
| Bronze medal – third place | 1920 Antwerp | Sabre, team |
| Bronze medal – third place | 1924 Paris | Sabre, team |

Jetze Doorman (2 July 1881 – 28 February 1931) was a Dutch fencer. He won four Olympic bronze medals. He also competed in the modern pentathlon at the 1912 Summer Olympics.

Doorman won the European Champion in Paris in 1907. This victory caused that the Netherlands had to organize the championships the next year and due to that the Dutch national fencing association, now called "Koninklijke Nederlandse Algemene Schermbond" (KNAS) was established.
