= Antoine Van Tomme =

Belgian fencer

Sport
- Sport: Fencing

Antoine Van Tomme was a Belgian Olympic fencer. He competed in the individual and team sabre events at the 1908 Summer Olympics.
