= Vlastimil Lada-Sázavský =

Czech fencer (1886–1956)

Personal information
- Born: 31 March 1886 Prague, Bohemia Austria-Hungary
- Died: 22 April 1956 (aged 70) Prague, Czechoslovakia

Sport
- Sport: Fencing
Medal record
Men's fencing
Representing Bohemia
Olympic Games
Bronze medal – third place	1908 London	Sabre, Team

Vlastimil Lada-Sázavský (31 March 1886 – 22 April 1956) was a Czech fencer. He won a bronze medal in the team sabre event at the 1908 Summer Olympics, representing Bohemia.
