= Otto Becker (fencer) =

Danish fencer (1887–1970)

Personal information
- Born: 31 December 1887 Copenhagen, Denmark
- Died: 30 March 1970 (aged 82) Frederiksberg, Denmark

Sport
- Sport: Fencing

Otto Becker (31 December 1887 – 30 March 1970) was a Danish fencer. He competed in the individual and team épée events at the 1908 Summer Olympics.
