= Bedřich Schejbal =

Czech fencer

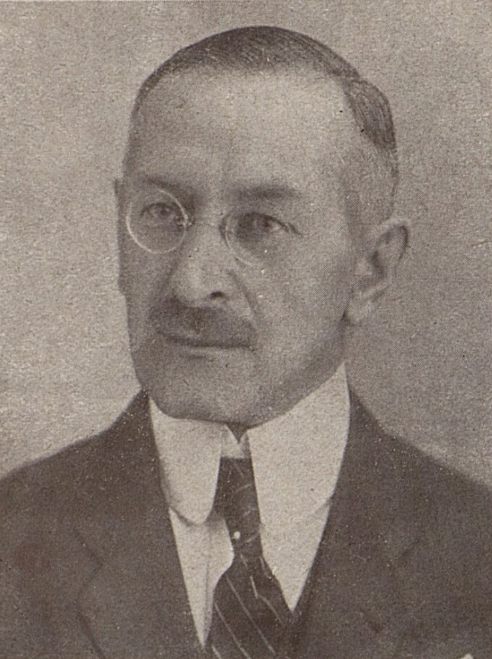

Personal information
- Born: 12 August 1874
- Died: Unknown

Sport
- Country: Bohemia
- Sport: Fencing
Medal record
Men's fencing
Representing Bohemia
Olympic Games
Bronze medal – third place	1908 London	Sabre, Team

Bedřich Schejbal (born 12 August 1874, date of death unknown) was a Bohemian fencer. He won a bronze medal in the team sabre event at the 1908 Summer Olympics.
