= August Petri =

German fencer

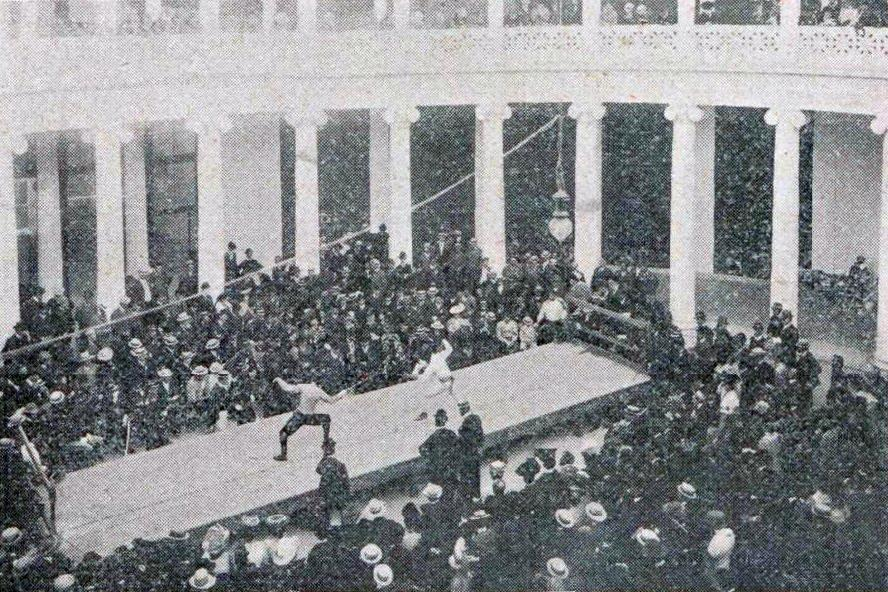

Personal information
- Born: 1878
- Died: Unknown

Sport
- Sport: Fencing
Medal record
Men's fencing
Representing Germany
Intercalated Games
Gold medal – first place	1906 Athens	Sabre, Team

August Petri (born 1878, date of death unknown) was a German fencer. He won a gold medal in the team sabre event at the 1906 Intercalated Games.
