= Marcello Bertinetti =

Italian fencer (1885–1967)

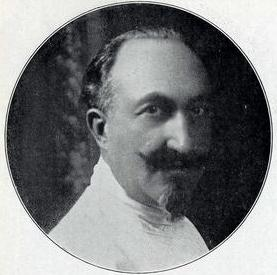

Personal information
- Born: 27 April 1885 Vercelli, Italy
- Died: 2 January 1967 (aged 81) Vercelli, Italy

Sport
- Sport: Fencing
Medal record
Representing Italy
Olympic Games
| Silver medal – second place | 1908 London | Sabre, team |
| Gold medal – first place | 1924 Paris | Sabre, team |
| Bronze medal – third place | 1924 Paris | Épée, team |
| Gold medal – first place | 1928 Amsterdam | Épée, team |
World Fencing Championships
| Silver medal – second place | 1929 Naples | Épée, individual |

Marcello Bertinetti (27 April 1885 – 2 January 1967) was an Italian fencer. He competed in sabre and épée events at the 1908, 1924 and 1928 Summer Olympics and won four team medals. Individually he won a silver medal in the épée at the 1929 World Championships.

Bertinetti did not compete between 1911 and 1922 when he served as a medical doctor in Libya. Earlier, he played football and won the national title in 1908. His son Franco and grandson Marcello also became Olympic fencers.
