= De Lesseps =

De Lesseps, Lesseps, or variation, may refer to:

== People ==
=== Surnamed ===
- Alexandre de Lesseps (born 1949), French entrepreneur
- Barthélemy de Lesseps, (1766–1834), French diplomat and writer
- Bertrand Marie de Lesseps (1875–1918), French fencer
- Ferdinand de Lesseps (1805–1894), French diplomat and developer of the Suez Canal
- Ismaël de Lesseps (1871–1915), French fencer
- Jacques de Lesseps (1883–1927), French aviator
- Luann de Lesseps (née Nadeau, formerly D'Agostino; born 1965), American television personality, model, author, and singer
- Count Mathieu de Lesseps (1771—1832), French diplomat
- Mathieu Marie de Lesseps (1870–1953), French equestrian
- Victoria de Lesseps (born 1994), French-American painter

=== Given named ===
- deLesseps Story Morrison, Jr. (1944–1996; nicknamed "Toni"), American lawyer, business consultant, and politician
- deLesseps Story Morrison, Sr. (1912–1964; nicknamed "Chep"), American attorney, politician, and mayor of New Orleans, Louisiana

=== Nicknamed ===
- William Tolly (1715-1784), nicknamed "Ferdinand de Lesseps of Calcutta"

=== Fictional characters ===
- Frank DeLesseps, a fictional character from the 2009 Stephen King novel Under the Dome (novel)
- Hugo Lesseps (Japanese: ユーゴー・レセップス, romanized: Yūgō Reseppusu), a character from Japanese light novel series Infinite Dendrogram
- Viola de Lesseps, the lead character in Shakespeare in Love

== Places ==
- 13641 de Lesseps, a minor planet named after French diplomat Jean-Baptiste Barthélemy de Lesseps
- De Lesseps Lake, a lake in Thunder Bay District, Northwestern Ontario, Canada
- De Lesseps River, a river in Thunder Bay District, Northwestern Ontario, Canada

=== Facilities and structures ===
- De Lesseps Lake Airport, Thunder Bay District, Ontario, Canada
- De Lesseps Field, a former airfield in Toronto, Ontario, Canada
- Fort De Lesseps, a former U.S. Army Coast Artillery Corps fort at Colón, Panama
- Plaça de Lesseps, Barcelona, Spain
  - Lesseps station, Barcelona Metro, Barcelona, Spain

== Other uses ==
- USS De Lesseps (1918), a World War I tug in the United States Navy
- Count of Lesseps (French: comte de Lesseps), a French nobility title held by Mathieu de Lesseps
- Viscount of Lesseps (French: viscomte de Lesseps), a French nobility title held by Ferdinand de Lesseps
- Lesseps affair (1888) bribery scandal involving Ferdinand de Lesseps

== See also ==
- Lessepsian migration
