= Guilly =

Guilly is the name of 2 communes in France:

- Guilly, in the Indre department
- Guilly, in the Loiret department
