= Suez (film) =

1938 American film directed by Allan Dwan

- Advertisement for the 1957 TV airing of Suez on the NTA Film Network
- Directed by: Allan Dwan
- Screenplay by: Philip Dunne; Julien Josephson
- Based on: a story by Sam Duncan
- Produced by: Darryl F. Zanuck
- Starring: Tyrone Power; Loretta Young; Annabella
- Cinematography: Peverell Marley, A.S.C.
- Edited by: Barbara McLean
- Music by: Louis Silvers (musical direction)
- Distributed by: 20th Century Fox
- Release date: October 28, 1938
- Running time: 104 minutes
- Country: United States
- Language: English
- Budget: over $1 million

Suez is an American romantic drama film released on October 28, 1938, by 20th Century Fox, with Darryl F. Zanuck in charge of production, directed by Allan Dwan and starring Tyrone Power, Loretta Young, and Annabella. It is very loosely based on events surrounding the construction, between 1859 and 1869, of the Suez Canal, planned and supervised by French diplomat Ferdinand de Lesseps. The screenplay is so highly fictionalized that, upon the film's release in France, de Lesseps' descendants sued (unsuccessfully) for libel.

Peverell Marley was nominated for the Academy Award for Best Cinematography, an uncredited Louis Silvers for Best Original Music Score and an uncredited Edmund H. Hansen for Best Sound Recording.

== Plot ==
"Paris in 1850 Louis Napoleon, nephew of the great Bonaparte, is president of the French Republic." During a tennis match in Paris between Ferdinand de Lesseps and his friend Vicomte Rene de Latour, the enthusiastic admiration of Countess Eugenie de Montijo for de Lesseps attracts the attention of Louis-Napoléon Bonaparte. Bonaparte sees to it that both she and de Lesseps are invited to his reception. At the party, a fortuneteller predicts that Eugenie will have a troubled life, but also wear a crown, and that de Lesseps will dig a ditch. Entranced by Eugenie's beauty, Bonaparte arranges for his romantic rival to be assigned to a diplomatic post in Egypt, joining his father, Count Mathieu de Lesseps, the Consul-General. De Lesseps impulsively asks Eugenie to marry him immediately, but she turns him down.

In Egypt, de Lesseps befriends two people who will have a great influence on his life: Toni Pellerin, a tomboy being raised by her grandfather, French Sergeant Pellerin; and Prince Said, the indolent heir of his father, Mohammed Ali, the Viceroy (ruler) of Egypt. Toni makes it clear that she has fallen in love with him, but de Lesseps still pines for Eugenie. Count de Lesseps leaves for France, leaving his son to take his place.

One day, after a brief rainstorm in the desert, de Lesseps sees the water draining into the sea and comes up with the idea for the Suez Canal. He departs for Paris to raise the necessary funding; Toni goes along as well. He presents his proposal to Bonaparte, but is rejected. He is also disheartened to learn that Eugenie is now very close to Bonaparte.

France is on the verge of civil war between Bonaparte and the French Assembly, led by Count de Lesseps and others. Eugenie persuades Ferdinand de Lesseps to pass along Bonaparte's proposal asking the Assembly to disband, giving Bonaparte's promise to reconvene it once the civil unrest has been defused. Despite their misgivings, the members of the Assembly agree, only to be betrayed and arrested. Bonaparte assumes the throne of the revived French Empire, just as Count de Lesseps had feared. The news causes the count to suffer a fatal stroke. Ferdinand de Lesseps is outraged, but Toni persuades him to do nothing. In return for de Lesseps' help, Bonaparte (now Emperor Napoleon III), withdraws his objections to the canal, and construction commences under de Lesseps' direction.

The building of the canal progresses, despite Turkish sabotage. However, Napoleon unexpectedly withdraws his support out of political necessity; he needs to appease Great Britain, and the British prime minister is firmly opposed to the project. Prince Said bankrupts himself to keep the venture going, but it is not enough. De Lesseps goes to England to plead his case. The prime minister is unmoved, but the leader of the opposition, Benjamin Disraeli, is enthusiastic about the project. Disraeli tells him to return to Egypt and pray that Disraeli wins the upcoming general election. He does, and funding is assured.

As the canal nears completion, an enormous sandstorm threatens everything. When de Lesseps is knocked unconscious by flying debris, Toni rescues him by tying him to a wooden post, but is herself swept away and killed. De Lesseps finishes the canal and is honored by Eugenie, now Empress of France after her marriage to Napoleon III.

== Cast ==
- Tyrone Power as Ferdinand de Lesseps
- Loretta Young as Countess Eugenie De Montijo
- Annabella as Toni Pellerin
- J. Edward Bromberg as Prince Said
- Joseph Schildkraut as Vicomte Rene De Latour
- Henry Stephenson as Count Mathieu de Lesseps
- Sidney Blackmer as Marquis Du Brey
- Maurice Moscovitch as Mohammed Ali
- Sig Rumann as Sergeant Pellerin
- Nigel Bruce as Sir Malcolm Cameron
- Miles Mander as Benjamin Disraeli
- George Zucco as Prime Minister
- Leon Ames as Louis Napoleon
- Rafaela Ottiano as Maria De Teba
- Victor Varconi as Victor Hugo
- Georges Renavent as Bank President
- Frank Reicher as General Changarnier
- Carlos De Valdez as Count Hatzfeldt
- Jacques Lory as Millet
- Albert Conti as M. Fevrier
- Brandon Hurst as Franz Liszt
- Marcelle Corday as Mme. Paquineau
- Odette Myrtle as Duchess
- Egon Brecher as Doctor
- Alphonse Martell as General St. Arnaud
- Montague Shaw as Elderly Man
- Leonard Mudie as Campaign Manager
- Michael Visaroff as Jewel Merchant (uncredited)

== Production ==
A September 1937 news article reported that Tyrone Power was set to star in this film opposite Simone Simon. Darryl F. Zanuck reported earlier in June that Simon was assigned to the female lead. In March 1938, Zanuck revealed that he had set up a $2,000,000 budget, with recently retired from acting George Arliss, winner of the Academy Award for Best Actor for playing the title role in 1929's Disraeli, possibly returning to repeat, in Suez, his famed portrayal. Loretta Young and Annabella were cast in the same month, thereby ruling out a role for Simon. On April 23, 1939, six months after Suez's premiere, Tyrone Power, age 24, and Annabella, age 31, were married (his first marriage, her third), with the union lasting until 1948.

Philip Dunne later called the film "pretty bad".

"Tyrone Power played Ferdinand de Lesseps, the Lee Iaccoca of his day," said Dunne. "So he dug the Suez Canal, so what? My partner Julien Josephson and I invented a love story with the Empress of France (Loretta Young) to keep audiences going. We had to. The man was the world's biggest bore."

400 Arabian horses, 300 camels, and almost as many donkeys, were needed for this film.

== Contemporary reviews ==
The New York Times found the film "a handsomely sepia-tinted and ponderously implausible description of how the Suez Canal came to be built....Mr. Zanuck, in short, has endowed his historical excursion with everything but credibility....It is not precisely the role for Mr. Power, who has the screen manner one associates with the young men from Ted Peck's Escort Bureau."

The Washington Evening Star was more accepting of the inaccuracies, noting that "In preparing the script for the lavish, spectacular and expensive picture, Twentieth Century-Fox found the historical arrangement of character and situation somewhat lacking in adequate dramatic values. Accordingly, it changed them to suit their requirements. The result is a much better bit of entertainment than it is a lesson in history, which quite possibly is what Mr. Darryl Zanuck was after, so accuracy will have to take care of itself."

The New York Post acknowledged the plot's Hollywood touches while complimenting special effects: "The building of the Canal itself is celebrated with some genuinely spectacular photography, sets, and swarms of people. In the midst of the labor a magnificent tornado supplies the catastrophic Zanuck touch to the proceedings. It is comparable to the Chicago fire, the San Francisco earthquake, the Chinese locust plague or the South Seas hurricane....This is something that connoisseurs of movie catastrophes will have to add to their collections."

== Evaluation in film guides ==
Leonard Maltin's Movie Guide gives Suez 3 stars (out of 4) and, in its early editions, states, "elaborate Darryl Zanuck production surrounds good cast with 1850s France and Egypt". Since 1993, however, the write-up's final lines have been revised to read, "entertaining and elaborate hokum which apparently bears no resemblance to history. Power and Annabella later wed in real life". Steven H. Scheuer's Movies on TV also gives it 3 stars (out of 4), commenting, "well-photographed and lavish film which is supposed to tell the true story of how the Suez Canal was built. If it had done that, it might have been a great film instead of another colorful epic."

TimeOut Film Guide observes that "this highlights both Dwan's virtues and his flaws. The action/catastrophe are marvellously assured without ever going over the top, as is the handling of the human drama." It concludes that "Dwan—who is concerned with the modest virtues of honesty and fairness—is unable, indeed unwilling, to so combine both strands of his story. Accordingly, Suez is a series of incidents unconnected by dramatic urgency; Dwan, quite simply, is unconcerned with the building of the canal."

Assigning 3½ stars (out of 5), The Motion Picture Guide described it as "typically lavish Hollywood biography that bears even less relation to the truth than usual for the genre" and later went on to state that "inane dialog is the biggest culprit in this ridiculous view of 19th-Century French politics". The write-up also mentions that in his 1971 biography by Peter Bogdanovich, The Last Pioneer, Allan Dwan expresses admiration for Annabella's professionalism, in particular while filming the epic sandstorm. It goes on to state that "when the film was shown in France, the descendants of de Lesseps sued Fox, claiming that the engineer had been 54 when he first went to Egypt, and never had an affair with the Empress Eugenie. A French court threw out the case, determining that the film brought more honor to France than dishonor on the family. The film follows the usual formula of the other Zanuck biographical bowdlerizations: smart sets, great costumes, romance, fine special effects, and complete disregard of fact. Original release prints were sepia tinted."

== Reviews ==
- Nugent, Frank S. "THE SCREEN IN REVIEW; Suez Opens at the Roxy, with Tyrone Power as the Great Canal Builder-----The Sisters Features Errol Flynn and Bette Davis at the Strand" (The New York Times, October 15, 1938, p. 21) (subscription required)
- "Suez is at Santa Clara; Tyrone Power seen as Man Who Built the Suez Canal" (The San Jose News, January 3, 1939, p. 19)
- "Films in Glasgow: "Suez" and "The Ware Case"; Tyrone Power as de Lesseps: Donald Takes Up Golf" (The Glasgow Herald, April 18, 1939, p. 6)
- "THRILLING ROMANCE; Tyrone Power as Canal Builder" (The Age, June 5, 1939, p. 13)
