= USS De Lesseps =

Tugboat of the United States Navy

History

United States
- Name: USS De Lesseps
- Namesake: Ferdinand de Lesseps
- Acquired: 1918
- Fate: Probably returned to owner

USS De Lesseps was a tug in the United States Navy during World War I. She was named for Ferdinand de Lesseps.

De Lesseps was owned by the Panama Canal Company who loaned her in 1918 to the Navy for temporary use by the Commandant, 15th Naval District.
