= Mathieu de Lesseps =

French diplomat

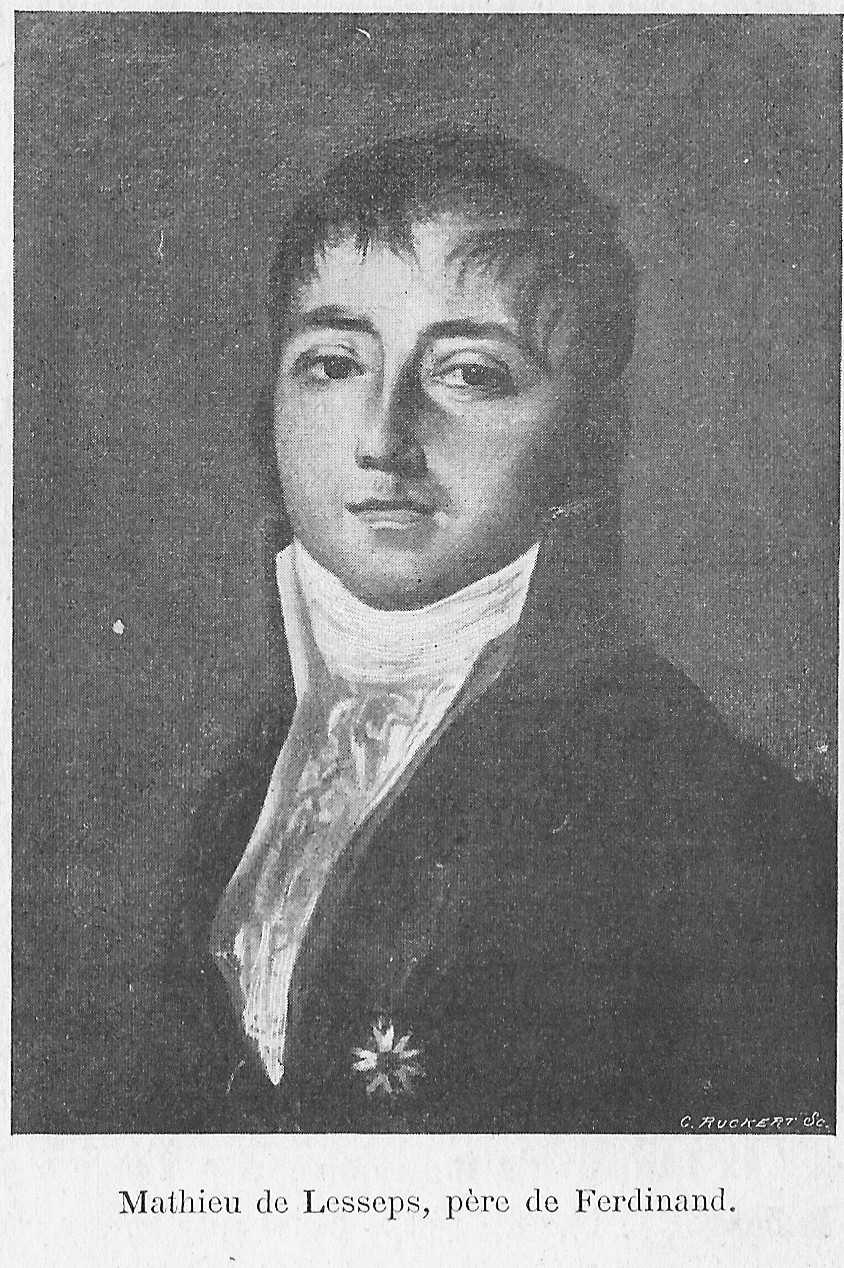
Portrait, dated to late 1790s, as reproduced in De Lesseps intime, an 1899 family biographical study. Caption: "Mathieu de Lesseps, father of Ferdinand."

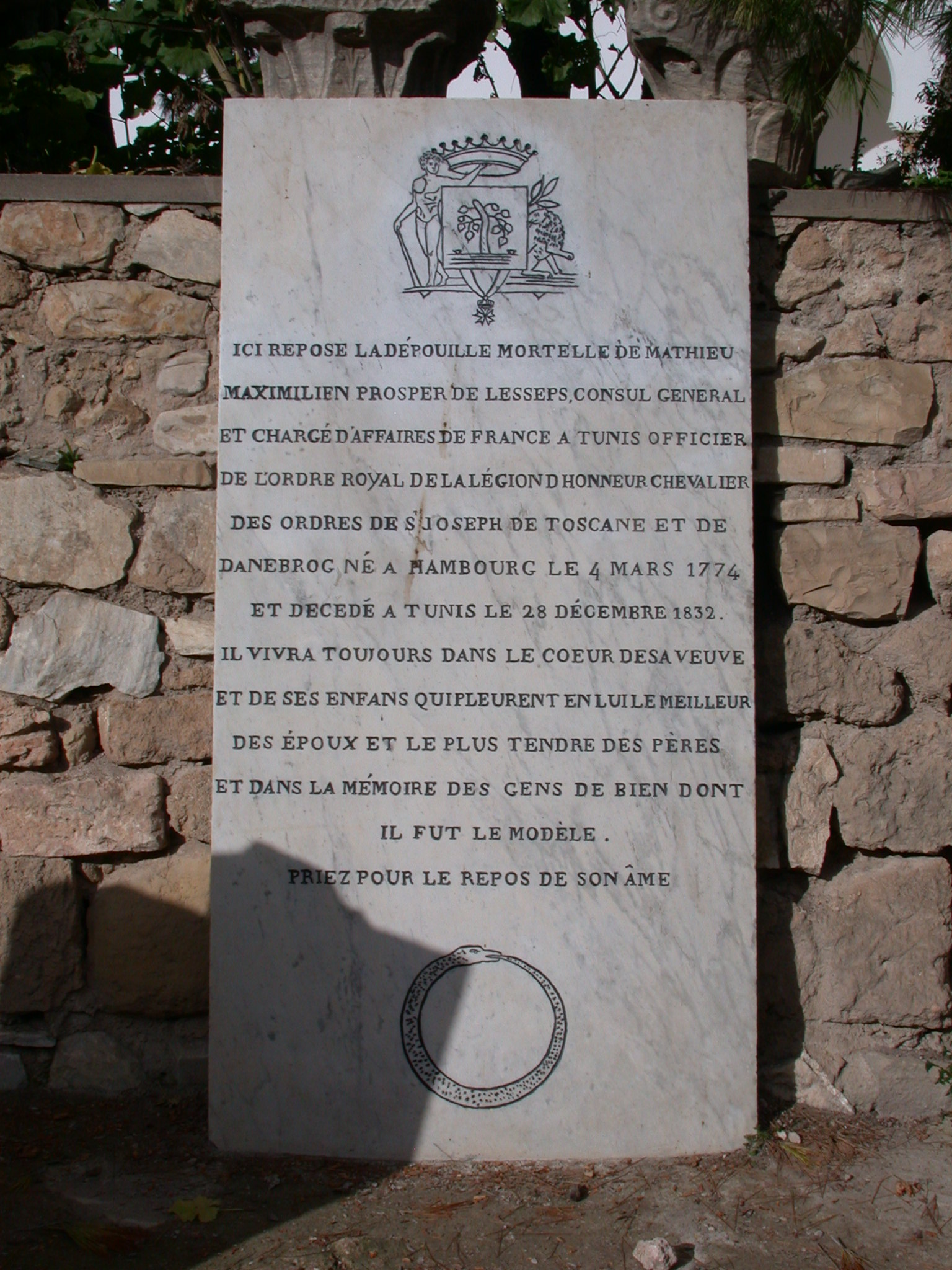
Tomb of Mathieu Maximilien Prosper de Lesseps in the Tunisian city of Carthage

Mathieu Maximilien Prosper de Lesseps (4 March 1771—28 December 1832) was a French diplomat and high ranking public official who served, from 1797 until his death, in numerous foreign and domestic posts. One of his sons, Ferdinand de Lesseps, was the developer and guiding spirit in charge of the construction of the Suez Canal.

Born in the German city of Hamburg, then part of the Holy Roman Empire, young Mathieu, the son of diplomat Martin de Lesseps (1730–1807) and his wife Anna Caysergues (1730–1823), spent his childhood there, and then in the capital of the Russian Empire, St. Petersburg, where his father was the French Consul General. The third of three children, Mathieu had a brother, Barthélemy de Lesseps (1766–1834), who became a renowned diplomat, writer and participant in the famous, though ultimately ill-fated, 1785–88 scientific expedition of Jean-François de Galaup, comte de Lapérouse. Their sister, Lise (1769–1840), was married in 1788 to Louis Maurice Taupin de Magnitot (1757–1823).

Mathieu de Lesseps entered government service in late 1797 at the start of the Second Directory, following the Coup of 18 Fructidor. On 21 May 1801, during the early period of his career, two years after Napoleon's ascent as First Consul, he married, in the Spanish port city of Málaga, Catherine de Grevigné y Gallegos (1730–1823), grandaunt of Eugénie de Montijo who, in 1853, would become Empress, as the wife of French Emperor Napoleon III.

They had the following children:

- a son, Théodore, born in Cádiz on 25 September 1802, married in 1828 to Antonia Denois (27 September 1802 – 29 December 1878), who died in Saint-Germain-en-Laye on 20 May 1874
- a daughter, Adélaïde (1803–1879), who married Jules Tallien de Cabarrus (1801–1870).
- their third child, Ferdinand de Lesseps (1805–1894), was born in Versailles,
- A fourth child, Jules, who, like his father, became a diplomat, was born in Pisa, on 16 February 1809, married Hyacinthe Delarue on 11 March 1874, and died in Paris on 10 October 1887.

Following his first major assignment, as French consul to Morocco, de Lesseps was posted, in 1800, as liaison to the Egyptian Army and as superintendent of trade relations. He served as inspector general in Livorno and as imperial commissioner, under General François-Xavier Donzelot, in Corfu from May 1810 until June 1814, during the Napoleonic Wars, as the British blockaded Corfu in the midst of the Adriatic campaign of 1807–1814.

In 1815, during the Hundred Days of Napoleon, he was Prefect of Cantal from 6 to 15 April and on 16 May was appointed special temporary inspector of the 19th Military Division, until relieved of duty on 14 July, following the second restoration of King Louis XVIII.

In subsequent years, he was sent as consul general to the United States, with stationing in Philadelphia on 16 September 1819, then to Syria, serving in Aleppo as of 1 May 1821 and, finally, on 3 August 1827, to the Tunisian capital, Tunis, where he performed diplomatic duties during his final five and a half years and where he died, at age 61. In the nearby historic city of Carthage, which in modern times has become a suburb of Tunis, Mathieu de Lesseps' tomb bears a lengthy graven inscription detailing the accomplishments of his public service.
