= Ismaël de Lesseps =

French fencer

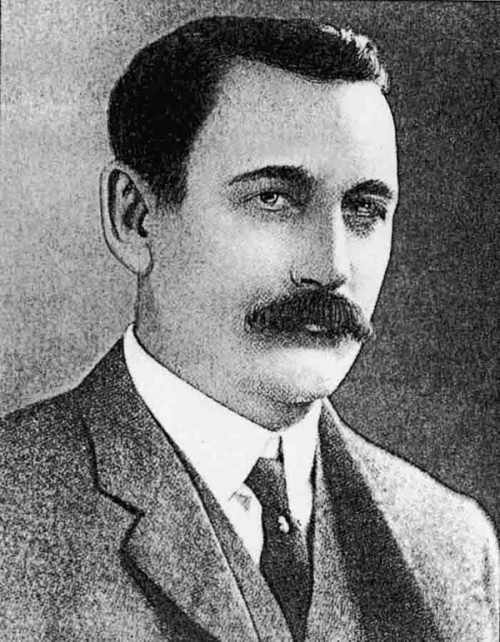

Personal information
- Born: 27 November 1871 Paris, France
- Died: 30 September 1915 (aged 43) Vigny, Val-d'Oise, France

Sport
- Sport: Fencing

Ferdinand Marie Ismaël de Lesseps (27 November 1871 – 30 September 1915), known as Ismaël de Lesseps, was a French fencer. He competed in the individual and team sabre events at the 1908 Summer Olympics. He was killed in action during World War I. He was the brother of Bertrand Marie de Lesseps and son of Ferdinand de Lesseps.

== See also ==
- List of Olympians killed in World War I
