= Bertrand Marie de Lesseps =

French fencer

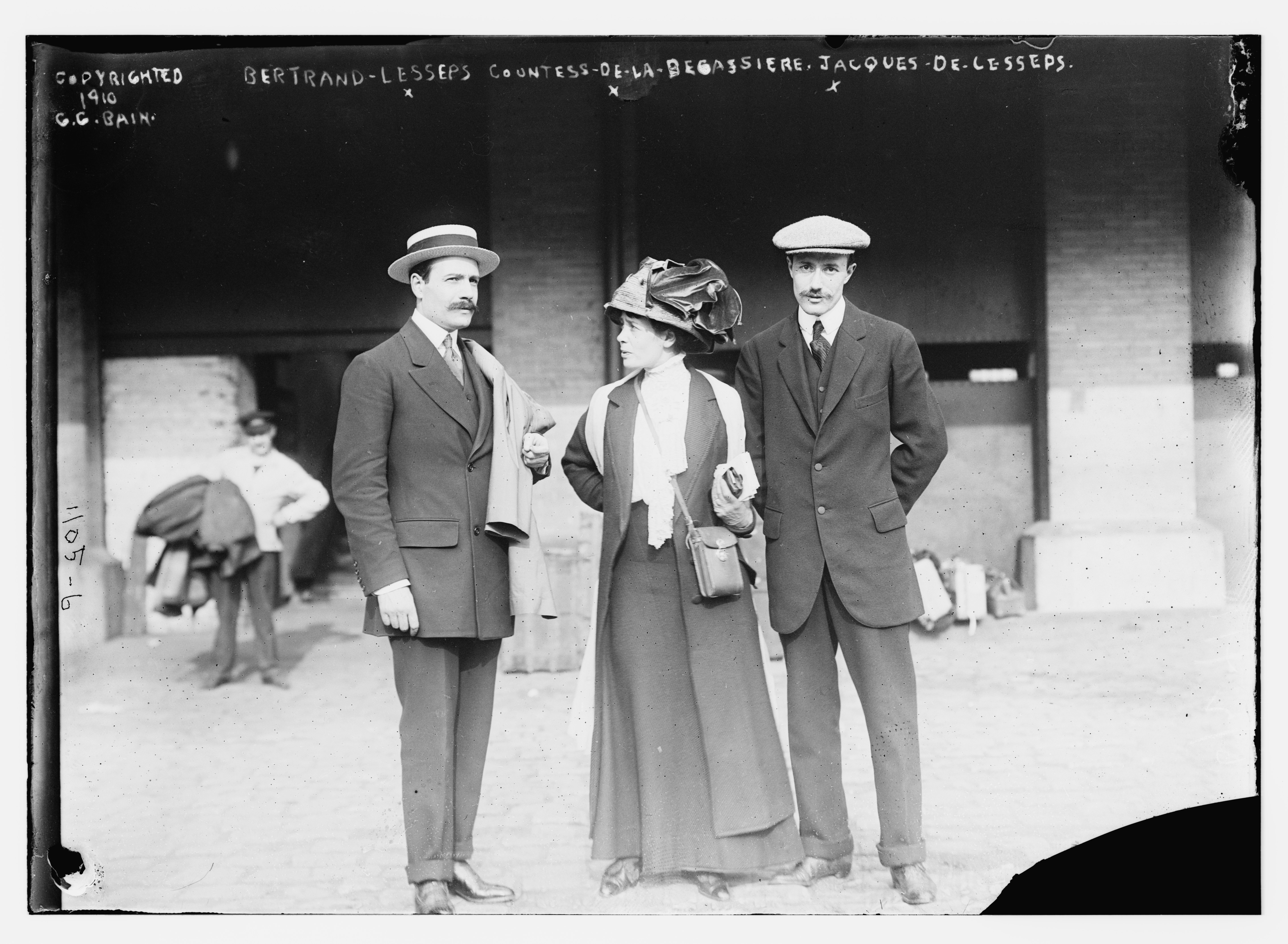

Personal information
- Born: 3 February 1875 Paris, France
- Died: 28 August 1918 (aged 43) Cauvigny, France

Sport
- Sport: Fencing

Bertrand Marie de Lesseps (3 February 1875 – 28 August 1918) was a French fencer. He competed in the individual and team sabre events at the 1908 Summer Olympics. He was killed in action during World War I. He was the brother of Ismaël de Lesseps, and son of Ferdinand de Lesseps.

== See also ==
- List of Olympians killed in World War I
