= Fort De Lesseps =

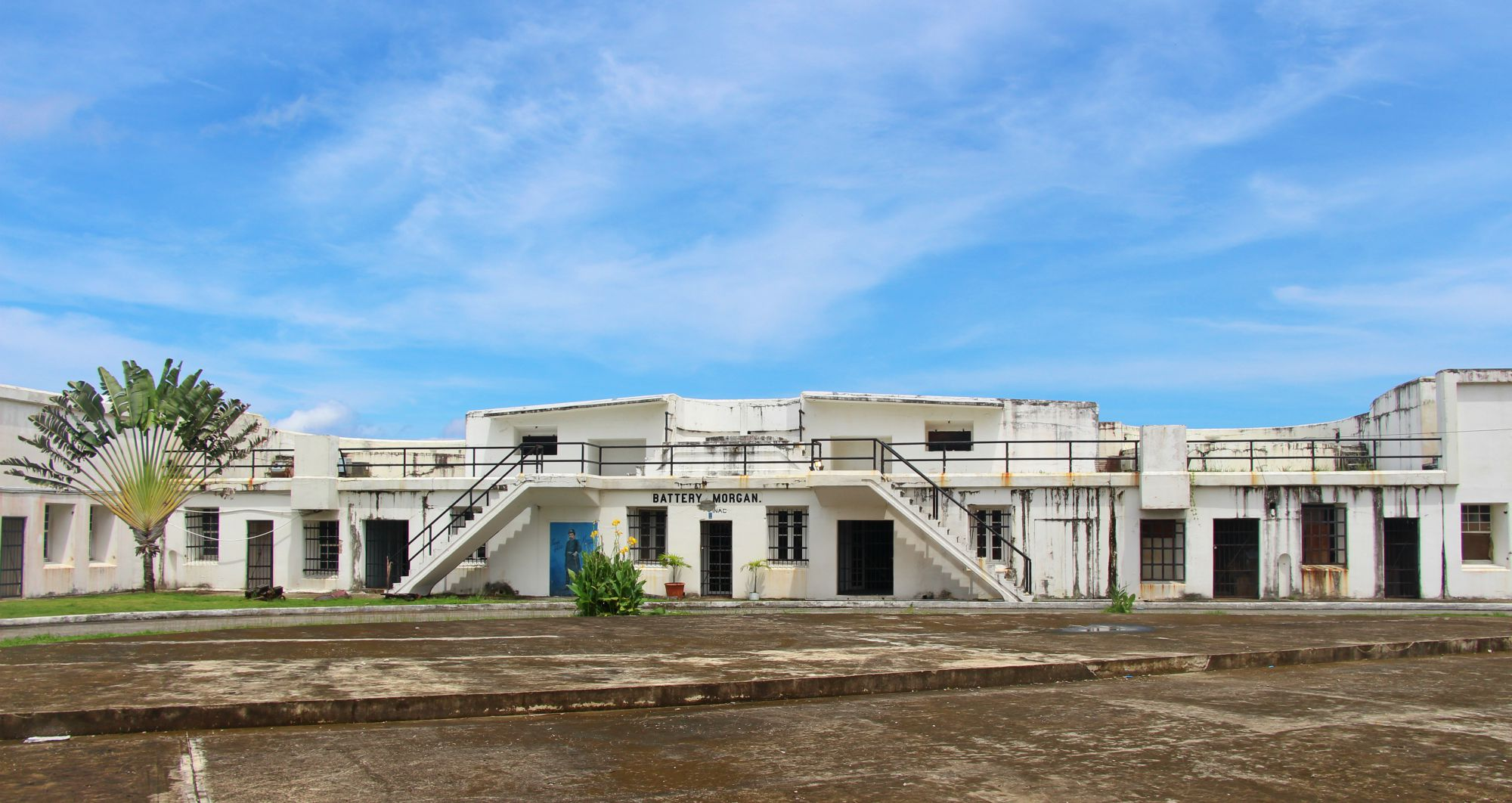
Battery Morgan at Fort De Lesseps

Fort De Lesseps was a small U.S. Army Coast Artillery Corps fort located at the northern tip of Colón, Panama. It was named after Ferdinand de Lesseps. It consisted of only one battery of two six-inch guns called battery Morgan, which were located across from the Hotel Washington. It had a spur from the railyards to its dock, where there was an administration building and barracks. Around the corner from the dock were five officers' houses and a theater. Between the gun batteries and hotel there was a sea-level swimming pool. The fort was occupied from 1913 until 1955.
