= Ferdinand de Lesseps =

French diplomat (1805–1894)

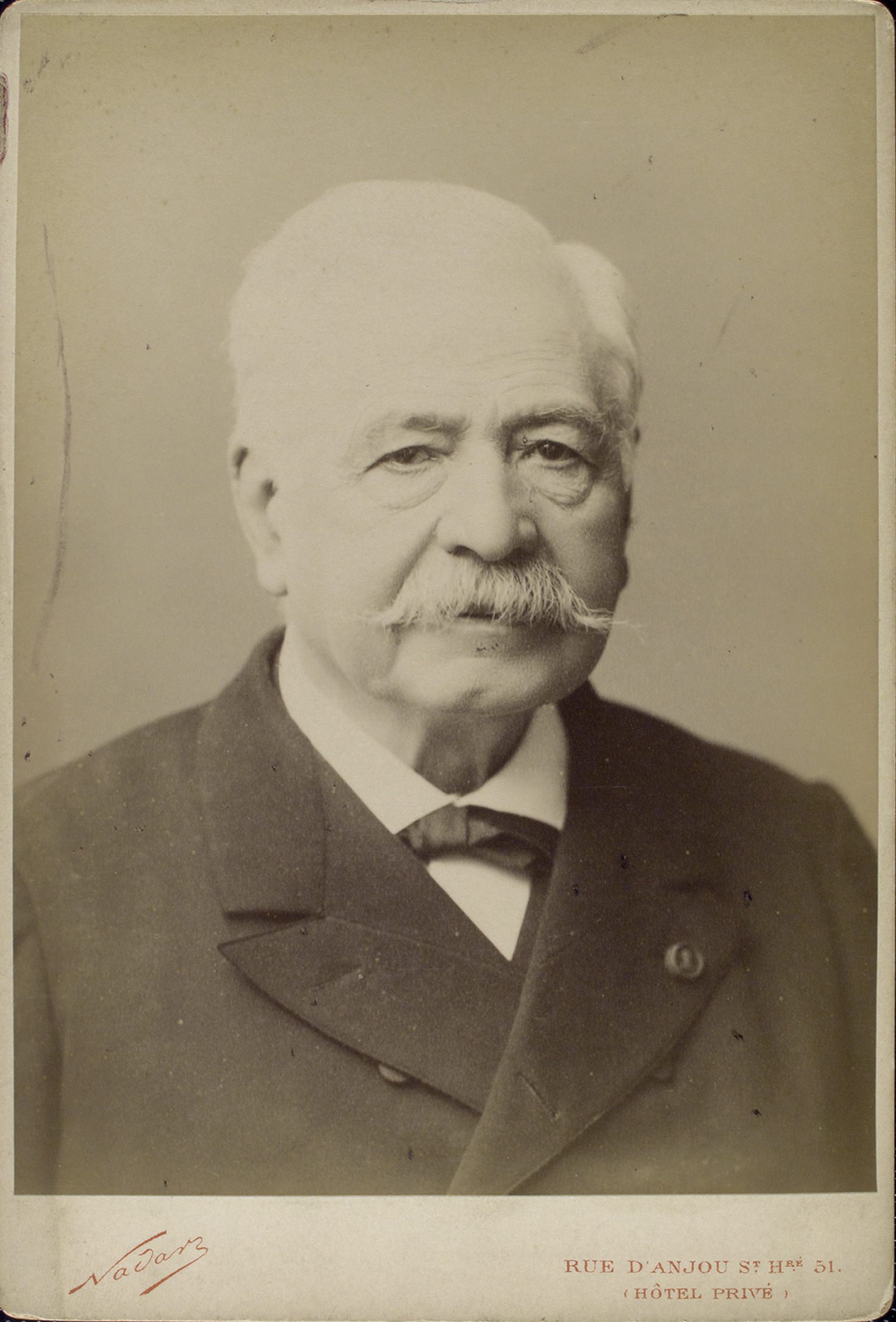
- Lesseps photographed by Nadar
- Born: 19 November 1805; Versailles, France
- Died: 7 December 1894 (aged 89); Guilly, France
- Education: Lycée Henri-IV, Paris
- Occupations: Diplomat, entrepreneur
- Known for: Suez Canal, Panama Canal
- Works: Recollections of forty years (1887)
- Awards: Albert Medal (1870)

Ferdinand Marie de Lesseps (French: [lesɛps]; 19 November 1805 – 7 December 1894) was a French Orientalist diplomat and later developer of the Suez Canal, which in 1869, joined the Mediterranean and Red Seas, substantially reducing sailing distances and times between Europe and East Asia.

He attempted to repeat this success with an effort to build a Panama Canal at sea level during the 1880s, but the project was devastated by epidemics of malaria and yellow fever in the area, as well as by financial problems, and the planned Lesseps Panama Canal was never completed. Eventually, the project was bought out by the United States, which solved the medical problems and changed the design to a canal above sea-level with locks. It was completed in 1914.

== Ancestry ==
The origins of Lesseps's family are traceable back as far as the end of the 14th century. His ancestors, it is believed, came from Spain, and settled at Bayonne during the period of the Angevin Empire. One of his great-grandfathers, Pierre de Lesseps (1690–1759), son of Bertrand Lesseps (1649–1708) and wife (m.1675) Louise Fisson (1654–1690), was town clerk and at the same time secretary to Queen Maria Anna of Neuburg, widow of Charles II of Spain.

From the middle of the 18th century, the ancestors of Lesseps followed diplomatic careers, and he himself occupied several diplomatic posts from 1825 to 1849. His uncle was ennobled by King Louis XVI, and his father was made a count by Emperor Napoleon. His father, Mathieu de Lesseps (Hamburg, 4 May 1774 – Tunis, 28 December 1832), was in the consular service; his mother, Catherine de Grévigné (Málaga, 11 June 1774 – Paris, 27 January 1853), was Spanish on her mother's side and aunt of the countess of Montijo, mother of the Empress Eugénie. She was a daughter of Henri de Grevigné (baptised at Notre-Dame-aux-Fonts, Liège, 2 June 1744) and wife (m.1766) Francisca Antonia Gallegos (1751–1853).

== Early years ==
Ferdinand de Lesseps was born November 19, 1805, in Versailles. He had a sister, Adélaïde de Lesseps (1803–1879), married to Jules Tallien de Cabarrus (19 April 1801 – 1870); and two brothers, Théodore de Lesseps (Cádiz, 25 September 1802 – Saint-Germain-en-Laye, 20 May 1874), married in 1828 to Antonia Denois (Paris, 27 September 1802 – Paris, 29 December 1878); and Jules de Lesseps (Pisa, 16 February 1809 – Paris, 10 October 1887), married on 11 March 1874 to Hyacinthe Delarue.

His first years were spent in Italy, where his father was occupied with his consular duties. His father then was appointed the first consul of France in Morocco and in 1800 joined the Egyptian army as commissioner of commercial relations. There the Lesseps struck friendship with the local ruler, Muhammad Ali of Egypt. Ali Pasha wanted his fourth son Sa'id to have an athletic body, and to get rid of his obesity, so he ordered his young son to exercise daily for two hours and follow a very simple diet. To safeguard the child's morals, he could visit no other house than that of de Lesseps. The young prince became friend of Ferdinand and "both of them revelled in devouring immense quantities of spaghetti. This intimacy and his longing for pasta caused Muhammad Said to hurry to the French consulate whenever the frugal diet of the viceregal table left a void in his stomach".

After Ferdinand returned to France he was educated at the Lycée Henri-IV in Paris. Sa'id was educated in Paris as well, and kept the friendship. From the age of 18 years to 20 he was employed in the commissary department of the army. From 1825 to 1827 he acted as assistant vice-consul at Lisbon, where his uncle, Barthélemy de Lesseps, was the French chargé d'affaires. This uncle was an old companion of Jean-François de La Pérouse and the only survivor of the expedition in which La Pérouse perished. Barthélemy de Lesseps had left the expedition in Kamchatka to travel to St Petersburg overland.

== Career ==
=== Diplomatic ===
In 1828, Lesseps was sent as an assistant vice-consul to Tunis, where his father was consul-general. He aided the escape of Youssouff, pursued by the soldiers of the Bey, of whom he was one of the officers, for violation of the seraglio law. Youssouff acknowledged this protection given by a Frenchman by distinguishing himself in the ranks of the French army at the time of the French conquest of Algeria. Lesseps was also entrusted by his father with missions to Marshal Count Bertrand Clausel, general-in-chief of the army of occupation in Algeria. The marshal wrote to Mathieu de Lesseps on 18 December 1830: "I have had the pleasure of meeting your son, who gives promise of sustaining with great credit the name he bears."

In 1832, Lesseps was appointed vice-consul at Alexandria. While the vessel, in which Lesseps sailed to Egypt, was in quarantine at the Alexandrian lazaretto, M. Mimaut, consul-general of France at Alexandria, sent him several books, among which was the memoir written upon the previously filled and abandoned Ancient Suez Canal, according to Napoleon Bonaparte's instructions, by the civil engineer Jacques-Marie Le Père, one of the scientific members of the French expedition.

This work struck Lesseps's imagination, and was one of the influences that gave him the idea of constructing a canal across the African isthmus. Fortunately for Lesseps, Muhammad Ali, the viceroy of Egypt, owed his position in part to the recommendations made on his behalf to the French government by Lesseps himself, who was consul-general in Egypt when Ali was a colonel. Because of this, Lesseps received a warm welcome from the viceroy and became good friends with his son, Said Pasha. Politically, the British were allied with the Ottoman government in Istanbul (doing so in order to prevent the Russians from gaining access to the Mediterranean) and had also assisted in repelling Ali's attempt to capture Istanbul in 1833. The French were able to manoeuvre in Egypt under Ali's graces by playing off the British intervention against Ali in Istanbul.

In 1833, Lesseps was sent as consul to Cairo, and soon afterwards given the management of the consulate general at Alexandria, a post that he held until 1837. While in Egypt he encountered and was influenced by Barthélemy Prosper Enfantin, who was working on a dam north of Cairo for Ali while preaching for a union of the Mediterranean and Red Seas. While he was there an epidemic of plague broke out and lasted for two years, resulting in the deaths of more than a third of the inhabitants of Cairo and Alexandria. During this time Lesseps went from one city to the other with zeal and energy. Towards the close of the year 1837 he returned to France, and on 21 December married Agathe Delamalle (1819–1853), daughter of the government prosecuting attorney at the court of Angers. By this marriage de Lesseps became the father of five sons: Charles Théodore de Lesseps (1838–1838), Charles Aimé de Lesseps (1840–1923), Ferdinand Marie de Lesseps (1842–1846), Ferdinand Victor de Lesseps (1847–1853) and Aimé Victor de Lesseps (1848–1896).

In 1839, Lesseps was appointed consul at Rotterdam, and in the following year transferred to Málaga, the ancestral home of his mother's family. In 1842 he was sent to Barcelona, and soon afterwards promoted to the grade of consul general. In the course of a bloody insurrection in Catalonia, which ended in the bombardment of Barcelona, de Lesseps offered protection to a number of men threatened by the fighting regardless of their factional sympathies or nationalities. From 1848 to 1849 he was minister of France at Madrid.

In 1849, the government of the French Republic sent Lesseps to Rome to negotiate the return of Pope Pius IX to the Vatican. He tried to negotiate an agreement whereby Pope Pius could return peacefully to the Vatican but also ensuring the continued independence of Rome. But, during negotiations, the elections in France caused a change in the foreign policy of the government – Alexis de Tocqueville replaced the previous foreign minister. Lesseps course was disapproved; he was recalled and brought before the Council of State. Louis-Napoleon needed a scapegoat and Lesseps was an easy target. Lesseps was accused of causing dishonor to the French army and was censured although he was not told to leave the Foreign Ministry.

Lesseps was created on 30 August 1851 the 334th Commander and then the 200th Grand Cross of the Order of the Tower and Sword.

Lesseps then retired from the diplomatic service, and never again occupied any public office. In 1853, he lost his wife and his son Ferdinand Victor at a few days' interval. In 1854, the accession to the viceroyalty of Egypt of Said Pasha gave Lesseps a new impulse to act upon the creation of a Suez Canal.

=== Suez Canal ===
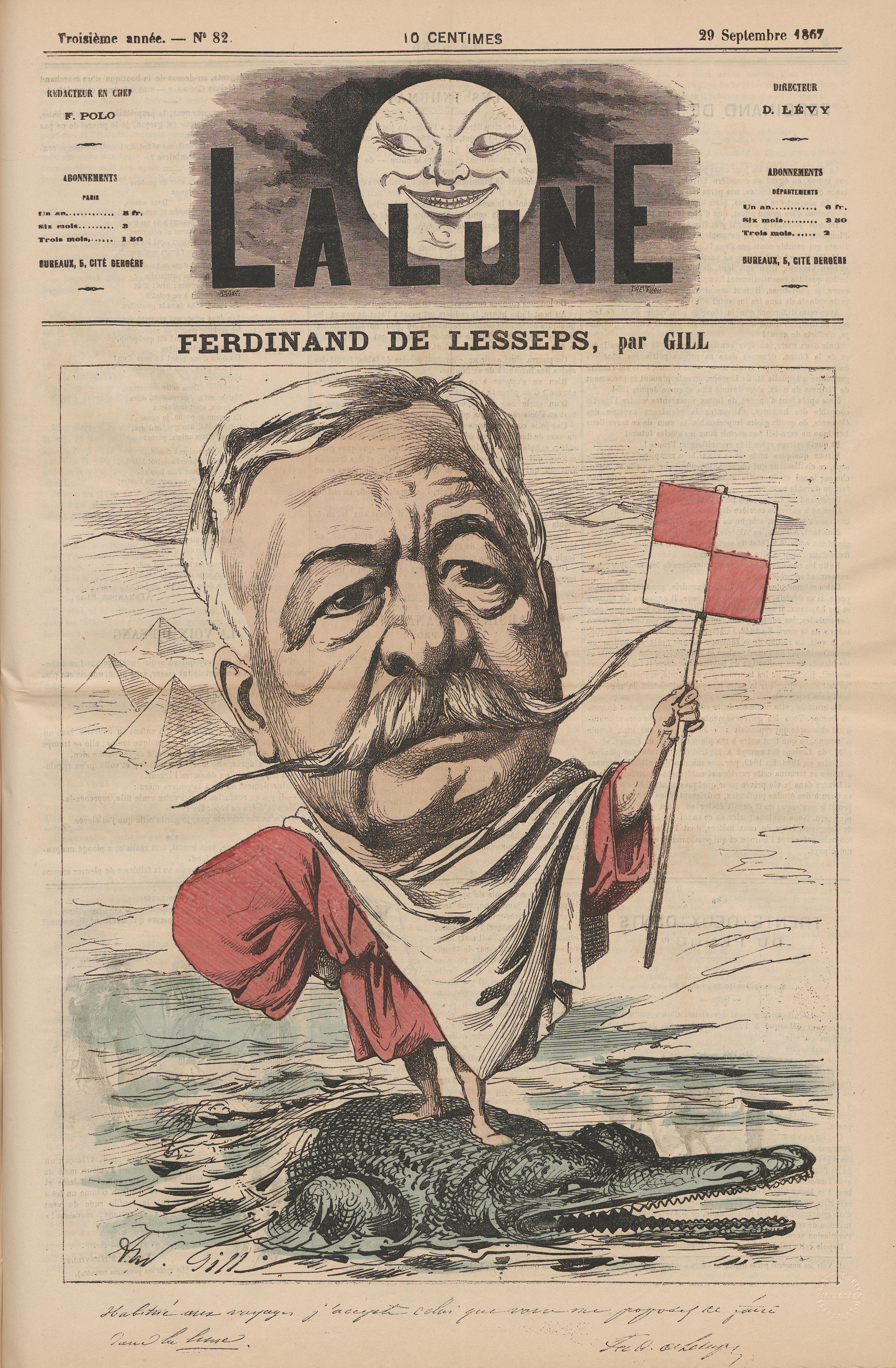
Caricature of de Lesseps by André Gill, 1867

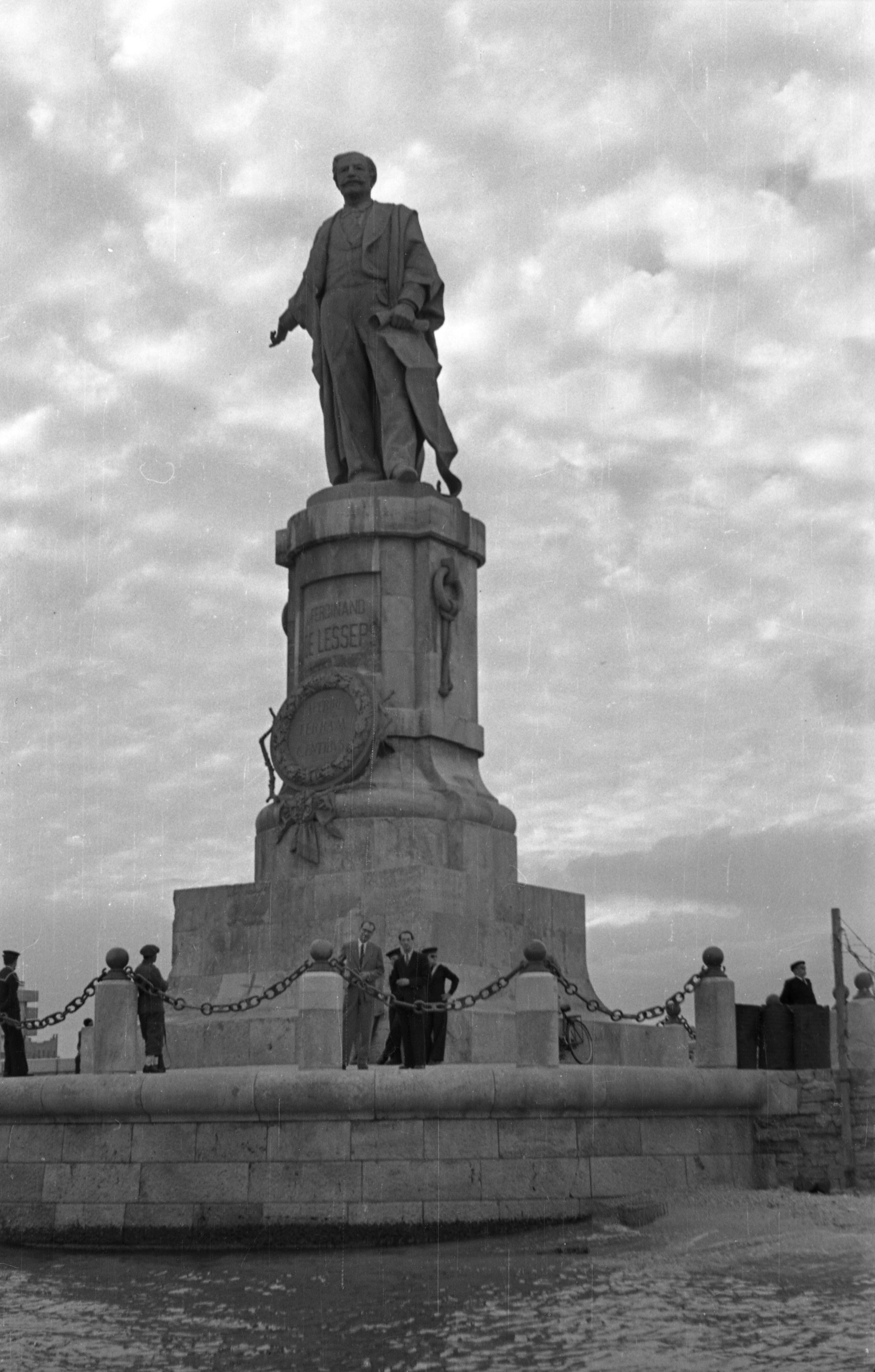
Lesseps's statue at the entrance of the Suez Canal, 1955. The outstretched hand indicated that the way was now open to the East.

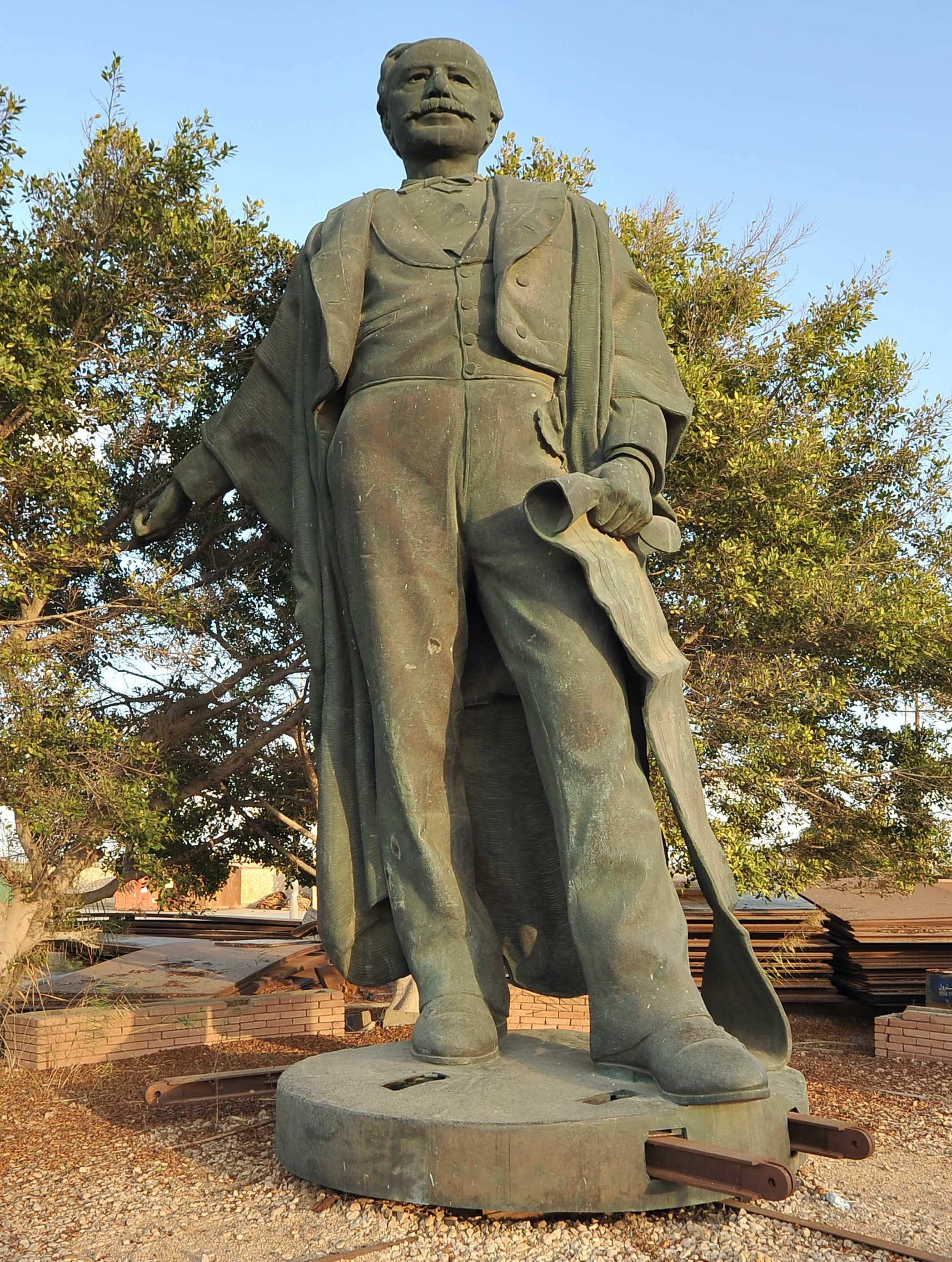
Lesseps's statue displayed today in front of the Suez Canal International Museum in Ismailia

Lesseps had corresponded at least once with the Société d'Études du Canal de Suez during the reign of Abbas I in Egypt, but Abbas had closed off most of Egypt to foreign influence. Upon Abbas's assassination in 1854, Lesseps made inquiries with a former, if short-term, acquaintance and successor in Egypt, Said Pasha. On 7 November 1854 he landed at Alexandria; on the 30th of the same month Said Pasha signed the concession authorizing him to oversee the French portion of the Suez Canal's construction.

A first scheme, initiated by Lesseps, was immediately drawn out by two French engineers who were in the Egyptian service, Louis Maurice Adolphe Linant de Bellefonds called "Linant Bey" and Mougel Bey. This project, differing from others that were previously presented or that were in opposition to it, provided for a direct link between the Mediterranean and the Red Sea. After being slightly modified, the plan was adopted in 1856 by the civil engineers constituting the International Commission for the piercing of the isthmus of Suez. Encouraged by the engineers' approval, Lesseps no longer allowed anything to stop him. He listened to no adverse criticism and receded before no obstacle. Neither the opposition of Lord Palmerston, who considered the projected disturbance as too radical and a threat to the commercial position of the British Empire. Lesseps was similarly not deterred by the opinions entertained, in France as well as in Britain, that the sea in front of Port Said was full of mud which would obstruct the entrance to the canal, and that the sands from the desert would fill the trenches.

Lesseps succeeded in rousing the patriotism of the French and obtaining by their subscriptions more than half of the capital of two hundred million francs which he needed in order to form a company, but could not attract any substantial capital contribution from the general public in British or other foreign countries. The Egyptian government thus subscribed for eighty million francs worth of shares.

The Compagnie universelle du canal maritime de Suez was organized at the end of 1858. On 25 April 1859, the first blow of the pickaxe was given by Lesseps at Port Said. During the following ten years, Lesseps had to overcome the continuing resistance of the British government, which kept the Sultan from approving the construction of the canal; at one stage even seeking the support of his cousin, Empress Eugenie, to persuade the Emperor Napoleon III to act as arbitrator in the disputes. Finally, on 17 November 1869, the canal was officially opened by the Khedive, Ismail Pasha.

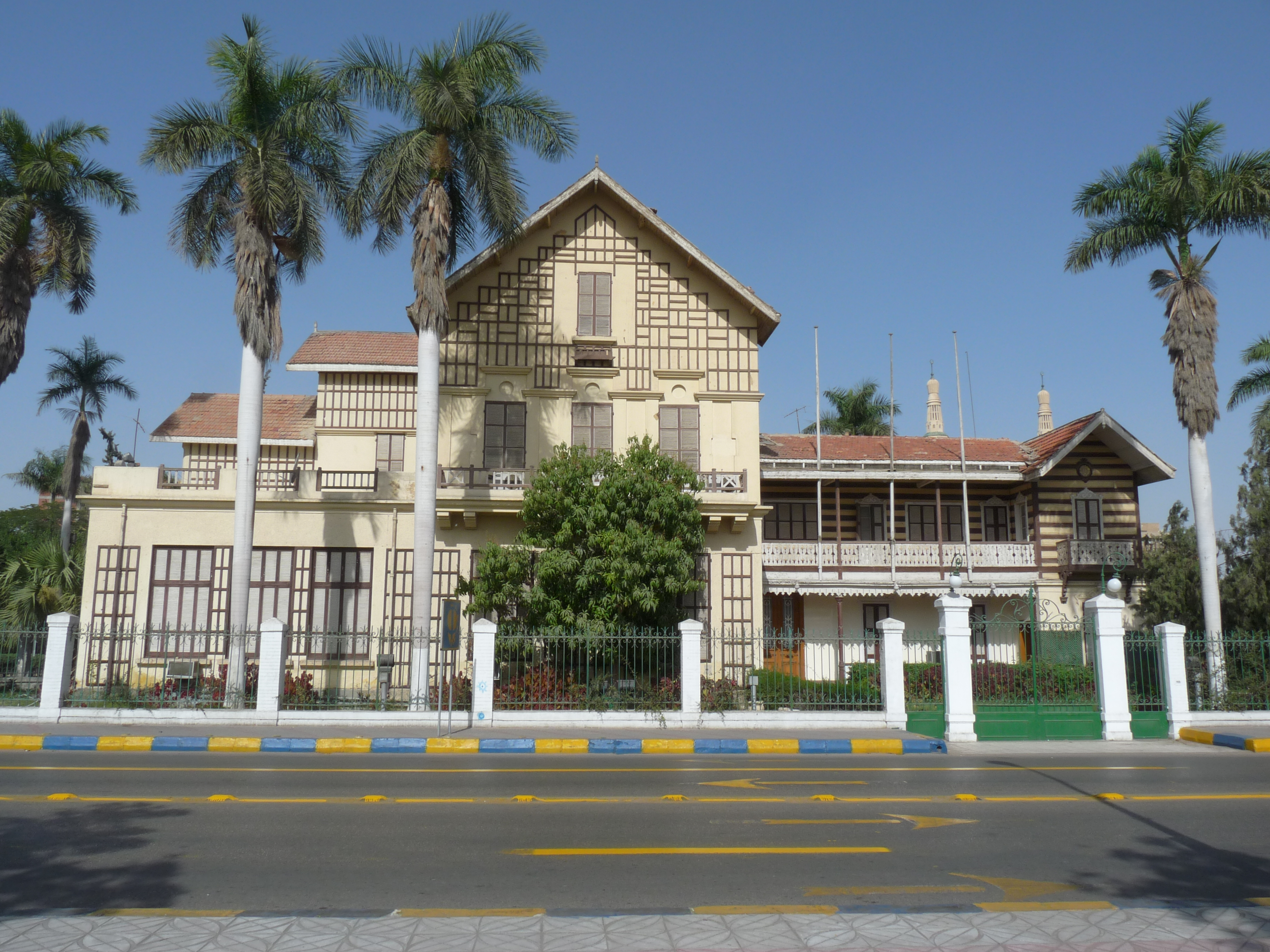
Ferdinand de Lesseps's house and office in Ismailia, near the Suez Canal

While in the interests of his canal, Lesseps resisted British government opposition to an enterprise which threatened to give France control of the shortest route to India, he acted favourably towards Britain's interests after Benjamin Disraeli acquired the Suez shares belonging to the Khedive, by admitting to the board of directors of the company three representatives from the government of Britain. The consolidation of interests which resulted, and which was strengthened by the addition in 1884 of seven more British directors, chosen from among shipping merchants and business men, increased, for the benefit of all concerned, the commercial character of the enterprise.

Lesseps steadily endeavored to keep out of politics. If, in 1869, he appeared to deviate from this principle by being a candidate at Marseille for the Corps Législatif, it was because he yielded to the entreaties of the Imperial government in order to strengthen its goodwill for the Suez Canal. Once this goodwill had been shown, he bore no malice towards those who rendered him his liberty by preferring Léon Gambetta. Afterward, Lesseps declined the other candidatures that were offered to him: for the Senate in 1876, and for the Chamber in 1877. In 1873, he became interested in a project for uniting Europe and Asia by a railway to Mumbai, with a branch to Beijing. The same year, he became a member of the French Academy of Sciences. He subsequently encouraged Major Roudaire, who wished to transform a stretch of the Sahara into an inland sea to increase rainfall in Algeria.

Lesseps accepted the presidency of the French committee of Leopold II of Belgium's International African Society. From this position he facilitated Pierre Savorgnan de Brazza's explorations, and acquired stations that Brazza subsequently abandoned to the French government. These stations were the starting-point of French Congo. Lesseps was elected a Foreign Honorary Member of the American Academy of Arts and Sciences in 1879.

From 17 November 1899 to 23 December 1956, a monumental statue of Ferdinand de Lesseps by Emmanuel Frémiet stood at the entrance of the Suez Canal.

=== Panama Canal attempt ===
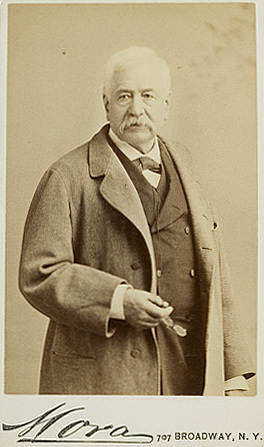

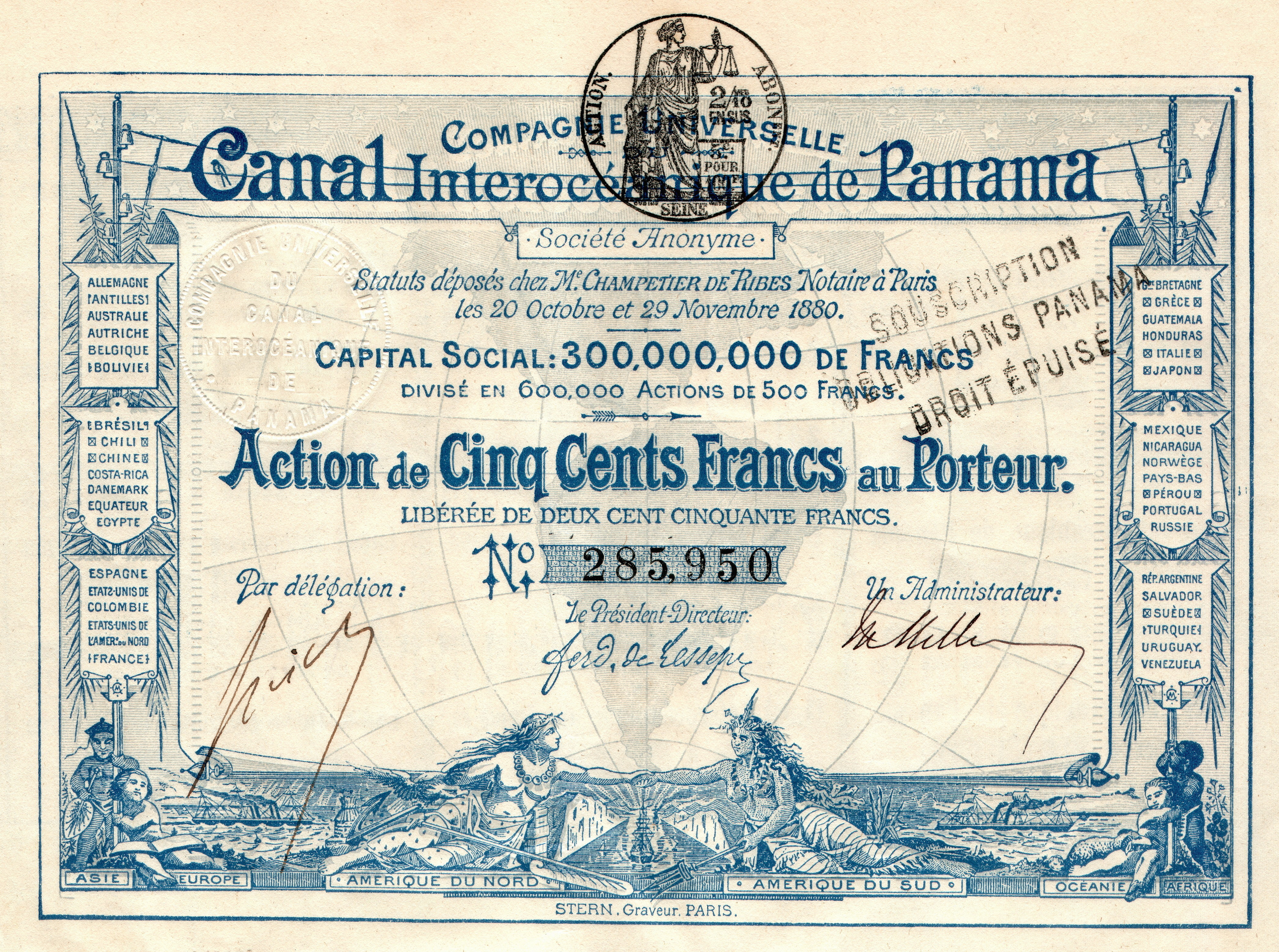
Share of the Compagnie Universelle du Canal Interocéanique de Panama, issued 29. November 1880 – signed by Ferdinand de Lesseps

In May 1879, a congress of 136 delegates (including Lesseps) assembled in the rooms of the Société de géographie in Paris, under the presidency of Admiral de la Roncire le Noury, and voted in favor of the creation of a Panama Canal, which was to be without locks, like the Suez Canal. Lesseps was appointed President of the Panama Canal Company, despite the fact that he had reached the age of 74. It was on this occasion that Gambetta bestowed upon him the title of "Le Grand Français". However, the decision to dig a Panama Canal at sea level to avoid the use of locks, and the inability of contemporaneous medical science to deal with epidemics of malaria and yellow fever, doomed the project.

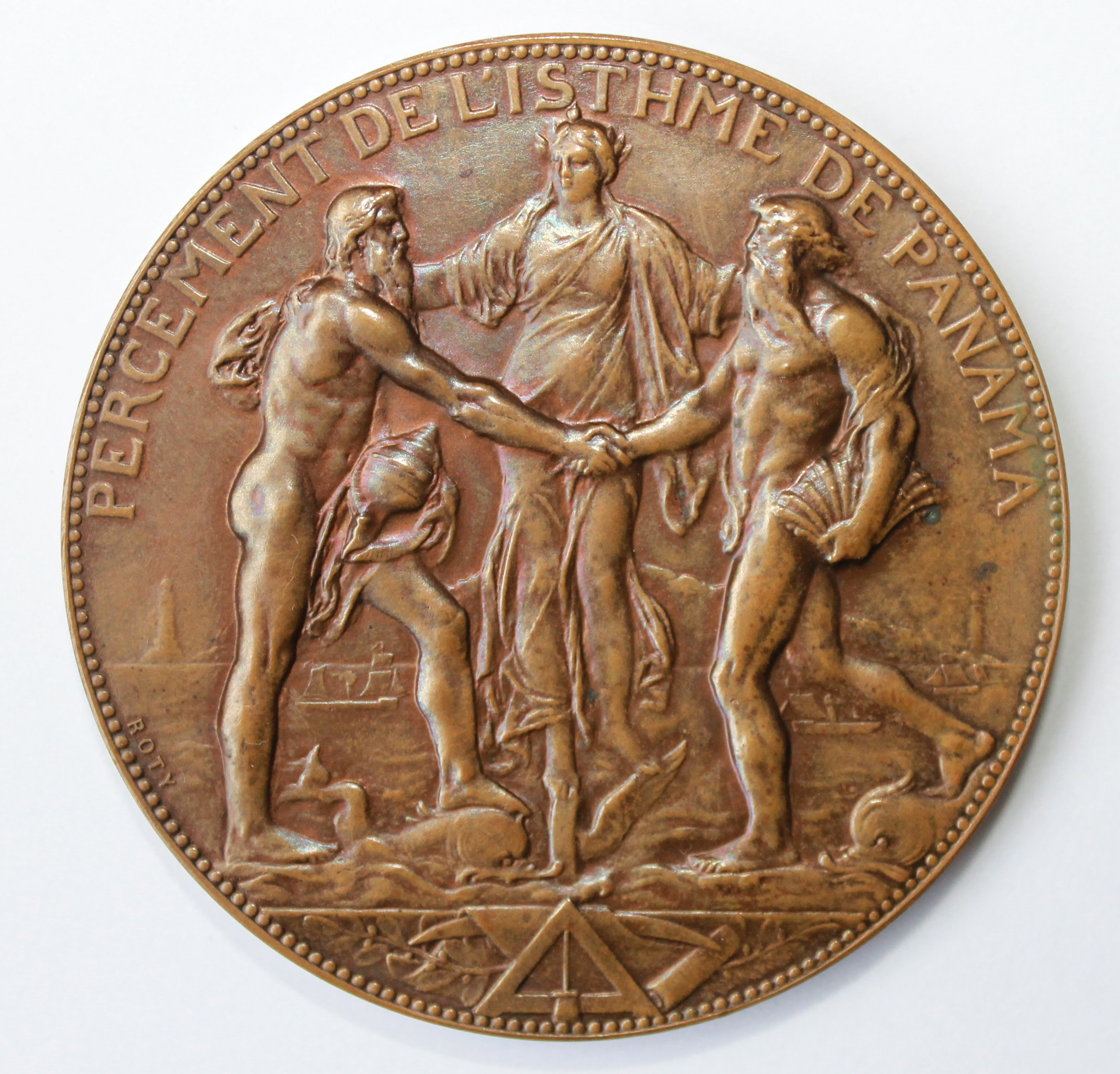
Piercing of the Isthmus of Panama, medal by Louis-Oscar Roty

In February 1880, Lesseps arrived in New York City to raise money for the project. When he stayed at the Windsor Hotel, its staff flew the French flag in his honor. He met the American Society of Civil Engineers and the Geographic Society while touring the area. Lesseps then went to Washington D.C., met with President Rutherford B. Hayes, and testified to the House Interoceanic Canal Committee. He later went to Boston, Chicago, and several other American cities to raise interest and capital for the project.

In June 1880, Lesseps gave a speech in Liverpool where he was able to find support from a Captain Peacock, who felt the canal project was worth supporting as it would provide routes to save time.

Lesseps went with his youngest child to Panama to see the planned pathway. He estimated in 1880 that the project would take 658 million francs and eight years to complete. After two years of surveys, work on the canal began in 1882. However, the technical difficulties of operating in the wet tropics dogged the project. Particularly disastrous were recurrent landslides into the excavations from the bordering water-saturated hills, and the death toll from malaria and yellow fever. In the end, insufficient financial capital and financial corruption ended the project. The Panama Canal Company declared itself bankrupt in December 1888 and entered liquidation in February 1889.

The failure of the project is sometimes referred to as the Panama Canal Scandal, after rumors circulated that French politicians and journalists had received bribes. By 1892 it emerged that 150 French deputies had been bribed into voting for the allocation of financial aid to the Panama Canal Company, and in February 1893 Lesseps, his son Charles (born 1849), and a number of others faced trial and were found guilty. Lesseps was ordered to pay a fine and serve a prison sentence, but the latter was overturned by the Court of Cassation on the grounds that it had been more than three years since the crime was committed. Ultimately, in 1904 the United States bought out the assets of the Company and resumed work under a revised plan.

== Second marriage and issue ==
In Paris on November 25, 1869—a week after the opening of the Suez Canal—Lesseps married his second wife, who was a third his age. Louise-Hélène Autard de Bragard was born on the island of Mauritius in 1848 at Plaines Wilhems and died on 29 January 1909 at Château de La Chesnay in Guilly, Vatan, Indre. She was the daughter of Gustave Adolphe Autard de Bragard, a former Magistrate of Mauritius, and wife Marie-Louise Carcenac (1817–1857), daughter of Pierre Carcenac (1771–1819) and wife Marie Françoise Dessachis. Eleven of her twelve children (six boys and six girls) with Lesseps survived their father:

- Mathieu Marie de Lesseps (1870–1953)
- Ferdinand-Ismaël de Lesseps (1871–1915)
- Ferdinande de Lesseps (1872–1948), married firstly in Paris on 10 May 1890 to Ferdinand de Gontaut-Biron (1868–1898), of the Marquesses of Saint-Blancard, by whom she had a son Ferdinand de Gontaut-Biron (1892–1892), and married secondly François-Joseph de Cassagne de Beaufort, Marquis de Miramon (1867–1932)
- Eugénie Marie de Lesseps (1873–1874)
- Bertrand de Lesseps (1875–1918)
- Marie Consuelo de Lesseps (1875–1944)
- Marie-Eugénie de Lesseps (1876–1958), married in Paris on 11 December 1900 to François du Bouays de La Bégassière (1875–1914), and had issue:
  - Jacques du Bouays de La Bégassière, married to Joyce Blaffer, with issue.
  - Jeanne Marie Jacqueline du Bouays de La Bégassière (1907–1998), married to Jean de Contades (1902–1977; son of Jean de Contades and Rosa Augusta de los Dolores Guzmán y Zayas-Bazán), with issue:
    - Yvonne de Contades (b. 1928), married on 27 January 1951 to Bernard, Count of Harcourt (1925–1958; son of Bruno, Count of Harcourt and Princess Isabelle of Orléans), with issue
    - Antoine de Contades (b 1932), married on 15 November 1963 to Daphne Jean Jefferson, with issue. A son Yves de Contades
- Marie Solange de Lesseps (1877–?), married in Paris on 12 January 1910 to Don Fernando Mexía y Fitz-James-Stuart (1881–?), 6th Duke of Tamames, 3rd Duke of Galisteo and 12th Count of Mora, and had issue
- Paul Marie de Lesseps (1880–1955)
- Robert de Lesseps (1882–1916), married February 27, 1902 to Marthe Josepha Sophie Allard (1884–1970), and had issue:
  - Nicole de Lesseps
  - Robert Martin de Lesseps (1915–1981), married in London on 11 August 1945 to Beatrice Duggan (b. 1922), and had issue:
    - Claire de Lesseps (b. 1956), married to Johann, Graf von Gudenus (b. 1952), and has issue, one son and two daughters
- Count Jacques Benjamin de Lesseps (1883–1927), aviator, married Grace McKenzie 1911
- Gisele de Lesseps (1885–1973)

== Statue of Liberty ==
On 11 June 1884, Levi P. Morton, the Minister of the United States to France, gave a banquet in honor of the Franco-American Union and in celebration of the completion of the Statue of Liberty. Ferdinand de Lesseps, as head of the Franco-American Union, formally presented the statue to the United States, saying:

This is the result of the devoted enthusiasm, the intelligence and the noblest sentiments which can inspire man. It is great in its conception, great in its execution, great in its proportions; let us hope that it will add, by its moral value, to the memories and sympathies that it is intended to perpetuate. We now transfer to you, Mr. Minister, this great statue and trust that it may forever stand the pledge of friendship between France and the Great Republic of the United States.

In October 1886, Lesseps traveled to the United States to speak at the dedication ceremony of the Statue of Liberty on 28 October, and attended by President Grover Cleveland.

== Death ==
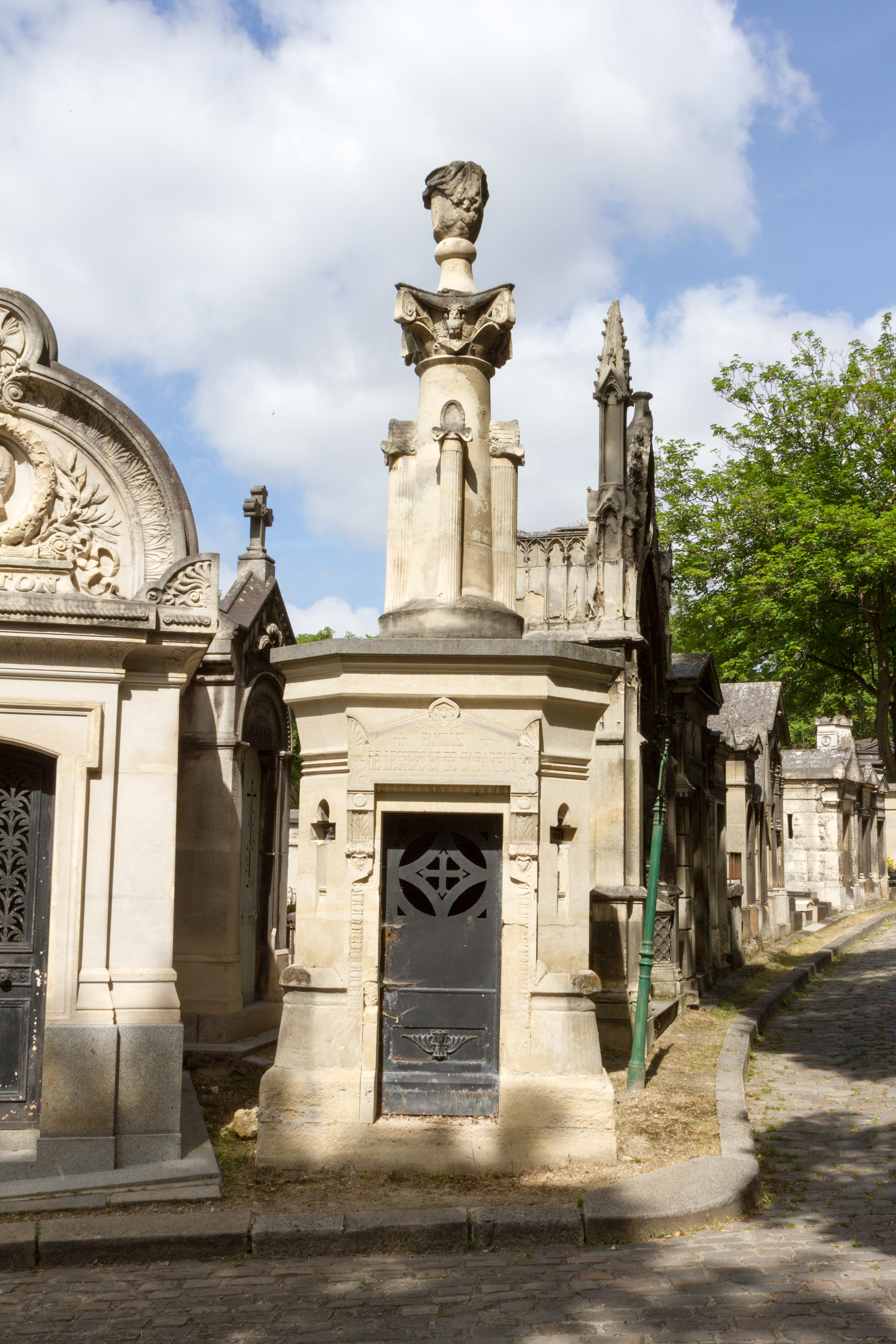
The grave of Ferdinand de Lesseps, Père Lachaise Cemetery, Paris

Lesseps died at Château de La Chesnaye in Guilly, Vatan, Indre, on 7 December 1894. He was buried in Père Lachaise Cemetery in Paris. The grave stands at one of the junctions amongst other large family tombs.

== Legacy ==
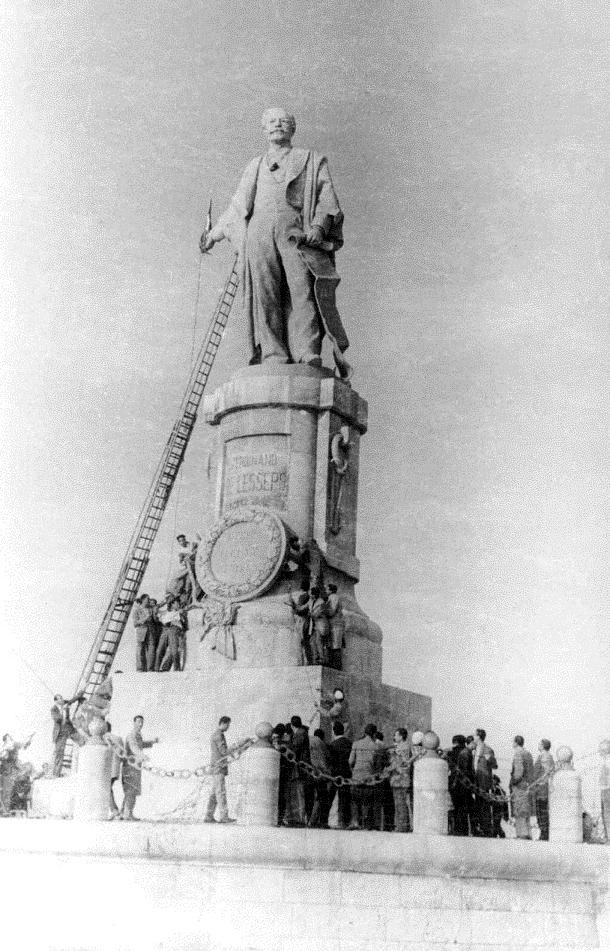
Removal of Lesseps's statue during the Suez Crisis in 1956

On 26 July 1956, Egyptian President Gamal Abdel Nasser used the word Lesseps as the codeword to trigger the seizure of the offices of the Suez Canal Company by Egyptian forces. Nasser used the codeword repeatedly in a public address in Alexandria that was broadcast to the nation via radio. Minutes later, he announced that he had issued a presidential decree nationalising the Suez Canal Company. The statue of Lesseps at the entrance of the Suez Canal was soon removed from its pedestal, as a protest by the outraged people in Port Said against the Anglo-French aggression on the city during the Suez Crisis to symbolize the end of European control of the waterway. The statue later stood in a small garden of the Port Fuad shipyard, before being restored and moved to the Suez Canal Museum in Ismailia. The empty base remains at its original site in Port Said.

== In popular culture ==
Lesseps was portrayed by Tyrone Power in the 1938 film Suez, with Loretta Young, a film which provoked complaints and legal action from Lesseps's family and the Egyptian government.

In addition, Manuel Soto played the part in a 1944 Spanish feature film, Eugenia de Montijo. On television, Guy Marchand played Lesseps in the 1983 French/German mini-series L'homme de Suez, and John Walters portrayed him in "The Panama Canal", an episode of the 2003 BBC docu-drama series Seven Wonders of the Industrial World.

Lesseps appears as a great engineer in the game Civilization V.

Lesseps is also discussed extensively in the David McCullough book The Path Between the Seas.

Lesseps's descendant Alexandre de Lesseps was married to LuAnn Nadeau (better known as Luann de Lesseps), a main cast member of the Bravo reality TV show The Real Housewives of New York.

== See also ==
- Lesseps metro station in the Barcelona Metro
- Fort De Lesseps, a U.S. military base in Panama was named in his honor
