= Guilly, Indre =

Guilly
- Commune
- Location of Guilly
- Location within France Location within Centre-Val de Loire
- Coordinates: 47°04′56″N 1°43′32″E
- Country: France
- Region: Centre-Val de Loire
- Department: Indre
- Arrondissement: Issoudun
- Canton: Levroux

Government
  - Mayor (2020–2026): Nadine Delage
- Area^{1}: 20.64 km^{2} (7.97 sq mi)
- Elevation: 130 m (430 ft)
- Highest elevation: 169 m (554 ft)
- Lowest elevation: 106 m (348 ft)
- Population (2023): 234
  - Density: 11.3/km^{2} (29.4/sq mi)
- Time zone: UTC+01:00 (CET)
  - Summer (DST): UTC+02:00 (CEST)
- INSEE/Postal code: 36085 /36150
- ^{1} French Land Register data, which excludes lakes, ponds, glaciers > 1 km^{2} (0.386 sq mi or 247 acres) and river estuaries.

Guilly is a commune in the Indre department in central France.

== Population ==
Historical population
| Year | Pop. | ±% p.a. |
|---|---|---|
| 1968 | 329 | — |
| 1975 | 279 | −2.33% |
| 1982 | 259 | −1.06% |
| 1990 | 252 | −0.34% |
| 1999 | 223 | −1.35% |
| 2007 | 244 | +1.13% |
| 2012 | 247 | +0.24% |
| 2017 | 244 | −0.24% |
| 2023 | 234 | −0.70% |
Source: INSEE

== See also ==
- Communes of the Indre department
