= Barthélemy de Lesseps =

Diplomat on the La Pérouse expedition

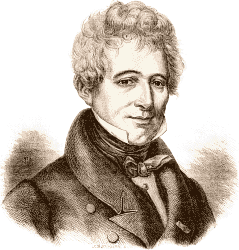
Portrait of Barthélemy de Lesseps. Engraving by Edouard Garnier

Jean-Baptiste Barthélemy de Lesseps (27 January 1766 in Sète – 6 April/26 April 1834 in Lisbon) was a French diplomat and writer, member of the scientific expedition of Jean-François de Galaup, comte de La Pérouse (1 August 1785 – January 1788) and uncle of Ferdinand de Lesseps.

== Family and early career ==
His childhood was spent in Hamburg and then St. Petersburg, where his father Martin de Lesseps (1730–1807) was the French Consul General. His mother was Anna Caysergues (1730–1823). He had a sister Lise de Lesseps (1769–1840), married in 1788 to Louis Maurice Taupin de Magnitot (1757–1823), and a brother Mathieu de Lesseps (Hamburg, 4 May 1774 – Tunis, 28 December 1832), married to Catherine de Grevigné (Málaga, 11 June 1774 – Paris, 27 January 1853), the parents of Ferdinand de Lesseps.

By age 12 he spoke fluent Russian, German, Spanish and, of course, French. After studying at the Jesuit college of Versailles for five years, he returned to St. Petersburg in 1783.

He was appointed Vice-Consul of France in Kronstadt and once had to intervene with the crew of the French ship Uranie of Dunkirk who had largely deserted. Noticed by France's Ambassador to Russia, Mr de Ségur, he was entrusted to carry important news to Versailles. There he met with Paul Antoine Fleuriot de Langle, second in command of the La Pérouse expedition, who had the respect of Louis XVI. La Pérouse asked the Minister of Marine and the Colonies, Charles Eugène Gabriel de La Croix, marquis de Castries to add Lesseps to the expedition as a Russian interpreter as the intended route took them into Russian territory in the north-west Pacific Ocean. His father should have been consulted but there was no time for that, so Castries appointed him to be vice-consul to succeed his father. Instead of returning directly to St. Petersburg, Lesseps would take the much longer route with La Pérouse to the north-west Pacific and then travel overland.

The frigates Boussole and Astrolabe left Brest on 1 August 1785. De Lesseps set out on the latter ship commanded by Paul Antoine Fleuriot de Langle.

The journey took the ships south across the Atlantic Ocean, around Cape Horn to the Pacific, stopping at Easter Island, Hawaii, modern-day Alaska, Macao, Manila, the Sea of Japan, the Sea of Okhotsk and then to the port of Saints Peter and Saint Paul, now Petropavlovsk-Kamchatsky on the eastern side of the Kamchatka Peninsula.

== Transcontinental journey ==
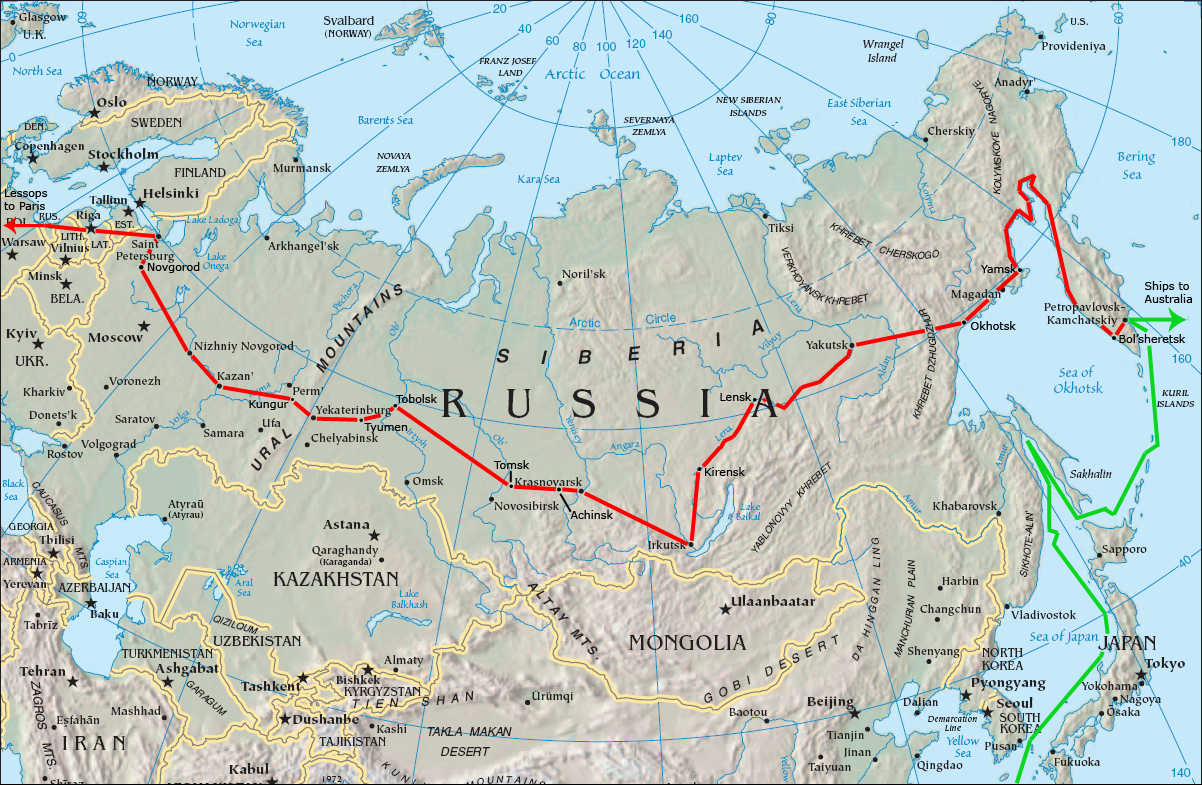
Path of Barthélemy de Lesseps of the La Pérouse expedition

While in port, La Pérouse received orders to proceed as quickly as possible to Australia to investigate a rumored British settlement at Botany Bay. Before leaving, however, he needed to get reports of the voyage back to Paris. Since ice would soon close the port for months, the only option that would keep the material under French control was to send it overland with de Lesseps.

The ships left on 7 October 1787, and de Lesseps left a week later with Kassloff Ougrenin, the governor of Okhotsk, traveling 160 km across the peninsula to Bolsheretsk, a journey that took two weeks, including the building of a raft to cross the Bolchaiareka River. From there they hoped to sail to Okhotsk; when that was not possible, they decided to follow the coast around the top of the Sea of Okhotsk, a distance of 1600 km. The party stayed in Bolsheretsk until the end of January while a convoy of 35 sleighs was assembled, but both the weather and Kassloff's official duties slowed progress. De Lesseps chose to separate from the main group, reaching Yamsk at the end of April. Speeded by a road, he reached Okhotsk on 8 May.

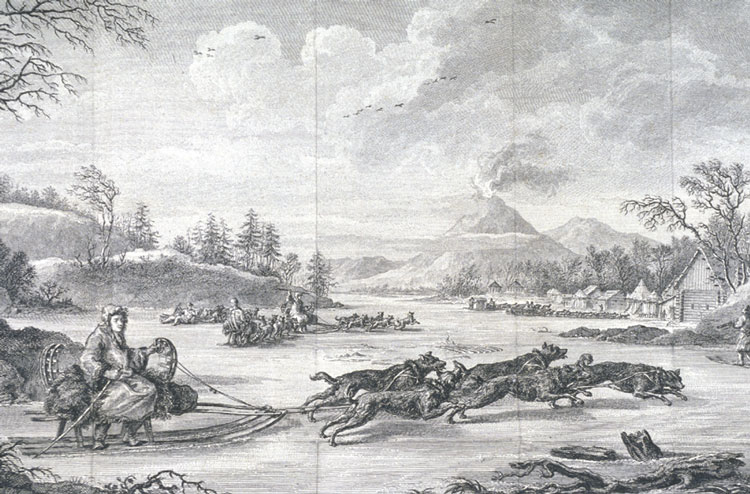
Lesseps crossing the Kamchatka Peninsula by dog sled

De Lesseps set off promptly for Yakutsk, 1200 km inland, but as the weather warmed and the tracks through the snow turned to mud, the sleighs were bogged down, so he dragged them back to Okhotsk.

On his return he was able to buy a few horses which he described as "frightful, half-starved beasts" before setting off again on 6 June. On 5 July he sailed up the Lena River to Lensk and then Kirensk; at the time both towns consisted of little more than a few log cabins. As it was now mid-summer, the water was no longer freezing, but clouds of midges swarmed near the shore. The boats broke up on the rapids, but de Lesseps was able to continue on horseback to Irkutsk, near the south-western end of Lake Baikal.

De Lesseps then used a carriage to travel through Krasnoyarsk, Achinsk, Tomsk, Tobolsk, Tyumen, Yekaterinburg, and Kungur in the Ural Mountains to Kazan, where he was injured in an accident. To avoid being caught for another winter, he pressed on to Nizhniy Novgorod, then (Veliky) Novgorod, reaching St Petersburg, his intended destination, on 22 September 1788, nearly a year after he started.

However, this was not the end of his journey. After delivering La Pérouse's reports to the French Ambassador, he learned that he was wanted in Paris, so he continued on through Riga, Königsberg and Berlin, reaching Paris on 17 October. The new Secretary of State for the Navy, César Henri, comte de La Luzerne, met him at Versailles, where he met Louis XVI, was greeted as a hero, and was appointed Consul at Kronstadt.

Given the subsequent loss of both ships, by leaving at Petropavlovsk, de Lesseps became one of three members of the original cast to survive the La Pérouse expedition, along with mathematician Louis Monge and naturalist Jean-Nicolas Dufresne.

== Career during and after the Revolution ==
His appointment to Kronstadt kept him clear of the violence of the French Revolution. In 1794, he was appointed assistant to Pierre Ruffin, secretary of the French legation in Constantinople, who was former French consul in Crimea. Following Napoleon Bonaparte's expedition to Egypt in 1798, there was great discontent against the French, who were subjected to violence. He was imprisoned with his wife and children at the Yedikule Fortress in Constantinople for three years. In August 1801, following the French evacuation of Egypt, they were released.

On his return to France, Bonaparte, First Consul, sent him to Saint Petersburg to organize the Consulate General there. At the beginning of 1802, he was responsible for supplying the French navy with timber. But after the battle of Austerlitz, the situation deteriorated. He went to join Talleyrand in Warsaw and from there left for Dresden where he met the emperor. After the Peace of Tilsit, he returned to the consulate of St. Petersburg, but in 1812 relations with Russia were broken again; the whole family had to leave.

In early September 1812, he was appointed consul-général in French-occupied Moscow by Napoleon, until the French retreat some weeks later. He was posted to Lisbon, where he spent the next 20 years until his death in 1834.

== Marriage and issue ==
He married Rose Catherine Cécile Lucie Ruffin on 16 september 1793 in Versailles and had twelve children:

- Aimée de Lesseps (Versailles 1794 – ?), married in Lisbon, Santa Catarina, on 15 April 1822 to Pierre Geoffroi Blanchet
- Virginie de Lesseps (1796 – Constantinople 1800)
- Marie Fortunée de Lesseps (Constantinople 1798 – Paris 1845), married in Lisbon, Santa Catarina, on 10 January 1820 to Charles Joseph Lagau
- Désiré de Lesseps (Constantinople 1800–1800)
- Lucie Virginie de Lesseps (Marseille 1801–1876), married first in Lisbon, Santa Catarina, on 5 November 1823 to Charles Joseph Gautier, and married a second time in Lisbon on 7 October 1834 to Julien François Lecesne
- Charles de Lesseps (1807 – ?)
- Hortense de Lesseps (Saint Petersbourg 1809 – ?), married in Paris in 1829 to Antoine Aimé Blachette
- Celeste de Lesseps (Saint Petersbourg 1810 – ?)
- Julie de Lesseps (Saint Petersbourg 1812 – ?), married to ...
- Edmond-Prosper de Lesseps (1815–1868), married to ...

== Publications ==
- Journal historique du voyage de M. de Lesseps, consul de France, employé dans l'expédition de M. le comte de la Pérouse en qualité d'interprète du roi; depuis l'instant où il a quitté les frégates Françaises au port Saint-Pierre et Saint-Paul du Kamtschatka jusqu'à son arrivée en France le 17 octobre 1788, Paris, Impr. royale 1790, 2 vol. Royal 1790, 2 vol. in 8. in 8. Also translated into English with the title, Travels in Kamchatka during the years 1787 and 1788, London 1790.
- Le messager de Lapérouse, du Kamtchatka à Versailles, J.B.B. de Lesseps, texte retranscrit et mis en forme par Catherine Marion, assistée de Grégoire Foussé, dans la collection Récits introuvables des éditions Pôles d’images, 2004.
- La Boussole, Des confins de la Sibérie à Versailles avec le messager de Lapérouse (1787–1788) (rough translation: The compass, From the confines of Siberia to Versailles with the messenger of La Pérouse (1787–1788)), Guy Vassal, Paris, 2006

== See also ==
- European and American voyages of scientific exploration
