= Australasia at the 1912 Summer Olympics =

- Australasian Olympic Flag
- IOC code: ANZ

in Stockholm
- Competitors: 26 in 4 sports
- Flag bearer: Malcolm Champion
- Medals Ranked 12th: Gold 2 Silver 2 Bronze 3 Total 7

Summer Olympics appearances (overview)
- 1908; 1912

Other related appearances
- Australia (1896–1904, 1920–); New Zealand (1920–)

Australasia was the name of a combined team at the 1912 Summer Olympics in Stockholm, Sweden, consisting of 26 athletes from Australia and New Zealand. The combined team had also competed at the 1908 Games, but Australia and New Zealand would send separate teams to the next Games in 1920.

There were three New Zealanders in the 1912 team; Malcolm Champion, Anthony Wilding and George Hill. Wilding won a bronze medal in the men's indoor tennis singles, and Champion won a gold medal as part of the swimming relay team.

== Medallists ==
Medal	Name	Sport	Event	Date
Gold	Fanny Durack (AUS)	Swimming	Women's 100 m freestyle	July 12
Gold	Leslie Boardman (AUS); Malcolm Champion (NZL); Cecil Healy (AUS); Harold Hardwick (AUS)	Swimming	Men's 4 × 200 m freestyle relay	July 15
Silver	Cecil Healy (AUS)	Swimming	Men's 100 m freestyle	July 10
Silver	Mina Wylie (AUS)	Swimming	Women's 100 m freestyle	July 12
Bronze	Harold Hardwick (AUS)	Swimming	Men's 400 m freestyle	July 14
Bronze	Harold Hardwick (AUS)	Swimming	Men's 1500 m freestyle	July 10
Bronze	Anthony Wilding (NZL)	Tennis	Men's indoor singles	May 12

== Results by sport ==
=== Athletics ===
Five athletes competed for Australasia at the 1912 Games.

Athlete	Events	Heat		Semifinal		Final	
Athlete	Events	Result	Rank	Result	Rank	Result	Rank
George Hill	5000 m			15:56.8	?	Did not advance	
George Hill	10000 m			Did not finish		Did not advance	
William Murray	10 km walk			Disqualified		Did not advance	
Stuart Poulter	Marathon					Did not finish	
Claude Ross	400 m	DNF	—	Did not advance			
William Stewart	100 m	11.0	?	?	?	Did not advance	
William Stewart	200 m	26.0	?	Did not finish		Did not advance	

=== Rowing ===
Ten athletes competed for Australasia at the 1912 Games. It was a match racing format.

Rower	Cox	Events	Heat		Quarterfinal		Semifinal		Final	
Rower	Cox	Events	Result	Rank	Result	Rank	Result	Rank	Result	Rank
Cecil McVilly		Single sculls	Disqualified		Did not advance					
John Ryrie; Simon Fraser; Hugh Ward; Thomas Parker; Henry Hauenstein; Sydney Middleton; Harry Ross-Soden; Roger Fitzhardinge	Robert Waley	Eight	6:57.0	Won	Lost		Did not advance			

=== Swimming ===
Nine athletes competed for Australasia at the 1912 Games. The team finished with six medals, two of each color, as well as one world record and an additional Olympic record at the end of the Games.

Fanny Durack and Mina Wylie, the two women who swam for Australasia, finished first and second in the only women's individual event, the 100 metres freestyle. Durack set a new Olympic record in the quarterfinals, which held throughout the rest of the competition.

The men's freestyle relay team earned the gold medal, breaking the world record of 10:26.4 (itself being newly set after the Americans broke the 10:53.4 set by the British team at the 1908 Summer Olympics) swam by the United States team in the first semifinal by swimming 12.4 seconds faster in the second final. The Australasia team dropped the world record in that event a further 2.8 seconds in the final.

Harold Hardwick and Cecil Healy each briefly took the Olympic record in the men's 400 meters freestyle heats, with the pair finishing third and fourth, respectively, in the final. Hardwick took another bronze medal in the 1500 free, while Healy took silver in the 100 free.

Swimmer	Events	Heat		Quarterfinal		Semifinal		Final	
Swimmer	Events	Result	Rank	Result	Rank	Result	Rank	Result	Rank
Leslie Boardman	100 m freestyle	1:06:0	6	1:05.4	7	Did not advance			
Malcolm Champion	400 m freestyle			5:37.0	5	5:38.0	6	Did not advance	
Malcolm Champion	1500 m freestyle			23:34.0	7	23:24.2	6	Did not finish	
Fanny Durack	100 m freestyle			1:19.8 OR	1	1:20.2	1	1:22.2	1
Harold Hardwick	100 m freestyle	1:05.8	5	1:06.0	8	Did not advance			
Harold Hardwick	400 m freestyle			5:36.0 OR	3	5:31.0	3	5:31.2	3
Harold Hardwick	1500 m freestyle			23:23.2	6	23:14.0	4	23:15.4	3
Cecil Healy	100 m freestyle	1:05:2	3	1:04.8	5	1:05.6	3	1:04.6	2
Cecil Healy	400 m freestyle			5:34.0 OR	1	5:37.8	5	5:37.8	4
William Longworth	100 m freestyle	1:05.2	3	1:05.2	6	1:06.2	5	Did not start	
William Longworth	1500 m freestyle			23:03.6	3	Did not start		Did not advance	
Frank Schryver	200 m breaststroke			3:24.0	17	Did not advance			
Frank Schryver	400 m breaststroke			7:07.8	10	Did not advance			
Theodore Tartakover	100 m freestyle	1:12.2	?	Did not advance					
Theodore Tartakover	400 m freestyle			Did not finish		Did not advance			
Mina Wylie	100 m freestyle			1:26.8	6	1:27.0	3	1:25.4	2
Leslie Boardman; Malcolm Champion; Harold Hardwick; Cecil Healy	4 × 200 m freestyle relay					10:14.0 WR	1	10:11.2 WR	1

=== Tennis ===
One athlete competed for Australasia at the 1912 Games. Anthony Wilding competed only in the indoor men's singles, finishing with the bronze medal.

Athlete	Event	Round of 64	Round of 32	Round of 16	Quarterfinals	Semifinals	Finals	Rank
Athlete	Event	Opposition Score	Opposition Score	Opposition Score	Opposition Score	Opposition Score	Opposition Score	Rank
Anthony Wilding	Men's indoor singles		Silfverstolpe (SWE); W – 6–0, 6–1, 6–1	Grönfors (SWE); W – 6–3, 6–3, 6–3	Caridia (GBR); W – 6–1, 6–2, 6–2	Dixon (GBR); L – 6–0, 4–6, 6–4, 6–4	Lowe (GBR); W – 4–6, 6–2, 7–5, 6–0	3
