= Ken Huszagh =

American swimmer (1891–1950)

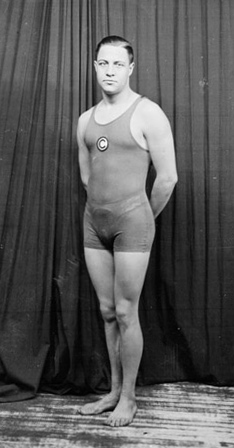
- Huszagh, circa 1912, in CAA swim jersey

Personal information
- Full name: Kenneth Arthur Huszagh
- National team: United States
- Born: September 3, 1891 Chicago, Illinois, U.S.
- Died: January 11, 1950 (aged 58) Delray Beach, Florida, U.S.
- Spouse: Frances Kleinsteuber

Sport
- Sport: Swimming
- Strokes: Freestyle
- Club: Chicago Athletic Association (CAA)
- College team: Northwestern University
- Coach: Alex Meffert (CAA); Tom Robinson (Northwestern)
Medal record
Men's swimming
Representing the United States
Olympic Games
Silver medal – second place	1912 Stockholm	4×200 m freestyle
Bronze medal – third place	1912 Stockholm	100 m freestyle

Kenneth Arthur Huszagh (September 3, 1891 – January 11, 1950) was an American competition swimmer who represented the United States at the 1912 Summer Olympics in Stockholm, Sweden in the 100-meter freestyle and the 4x200 freestyle relay. He later worked in the oil and chemical field in New England for the Hygrade Oil Company and the American Mineral Spirits Company while living in Stamford, Connecticut

== Early life and swimming ==
Huszagh was born in Chicago to Rudolph Daniel Huszagh and Henrietta Robinson on September 3, 1891 and grew up in a home on Chicago's Washington Boulevard. He was the second son of a family that would include three older and one younger brother, several of whom were also skilled swimmers. His brother Victor was a Chicago area competitor, who would swim for Amherst College beginning in 1909. His paternal immigrant ancestor came from the Austria-Hungary Empire (now Slovakia).

Excelling early as a sprinter, Huszagh represented Chicago's Lewis Institute in High School, where he set an early Illinois Interscholastic State record for the 100-yard swim of 1:06.2, and a record for the 40-yard swim of 21.2 seconds. At 18, he represented Lewis Institute at the Chicago Interscholastic meet at the Illinois Athletic Club on February 12, 1910, where he lowered the 40-yard swim mark to 19.4 seconds, considered at the time a world mark by the Chicago Tribune. Lewis Institute, which opened as a four year High School in Chicago in 1896 focused on technical subjects, and also offered a two year study in mechanical engineering. Prior to 1908, Huszagh's older brothers Rudolph, Victor, and Harold attended Lewis Institute as well.

Huszagh trained and competed for the Chicago Athletic Association by 1909 and through most of his swimming career would have Alex Meffert, swimming director for the Chicago Athletic Association, as his primary mentor and coach. Meffert coached both competitive swimming and hockey and would mentor swimmers that would become both Olympic swimming and hockey participants. He had formerly coached the Missouri Athletic Club. His focus with Huszagh was to further develop his use of the Australian crawl, known as the front crawl, which had become fully accepted since its adoption in American competition around 1905.

== Northwestern University ==
He attended Northwestern University, where he competed as a swimmer on their Wildcats team. At Northwestern, Huszagh was coached by the University's Hall of Fame Coach Tom Robinson, who began coaching at Northwestern when the swim team began in 1909. Robinson's Northwestern teams won five consecutive Big Ten Championships beginning in 1914. Huszagh became the first Northwestern swimmer to qualify for the Olympic team.

He held a record in the 50-yard freestyle of 23.6 seconds which he set at the Illinois Athletic Club pool on March 12, 1912.

== 1912 Stockholm Olympics ==
Representing the Illinois Athletic Club, Huszagh made the 1912 US Olympics team competition in Stockholm and competed in the 100-meter freestyle, in which he won a bronze medal with a time of 1:05.6. In a typically close finish, Duke Kohanamoku of the United States took the gold with a 1:03.4, and Cecil Healey of Australasia took the silver with a 1:04.6. The swimming events were held from July 6-July 12 in a course constructed in Stockholm harbor.

Competing in the 4x200 freestyle relay, Huszagh's American relay team briefly held a world record with their preliminary time of 10:26.4, soundly beating the old record established in the 1908 Olympics by nearly 30 seconds. In the final of Hszazgh's 4×200-meter freestyle relay, though they outperformed their briefly held world record, Huszagh's team finished second, taking the silver medal, with a combined time of 10:20.2. Huszagh swam lead-off and was followed by U.S. teammates Perry McGillivray, Harry Hebner, and Duke Kahanamoku. The Australian team placed first with a time of 10:11.2, clearly outperforming the Americans for the gold. The British team took the bronze finishing 8.4 seconds behind the American team.

=== Competing in Germany ===
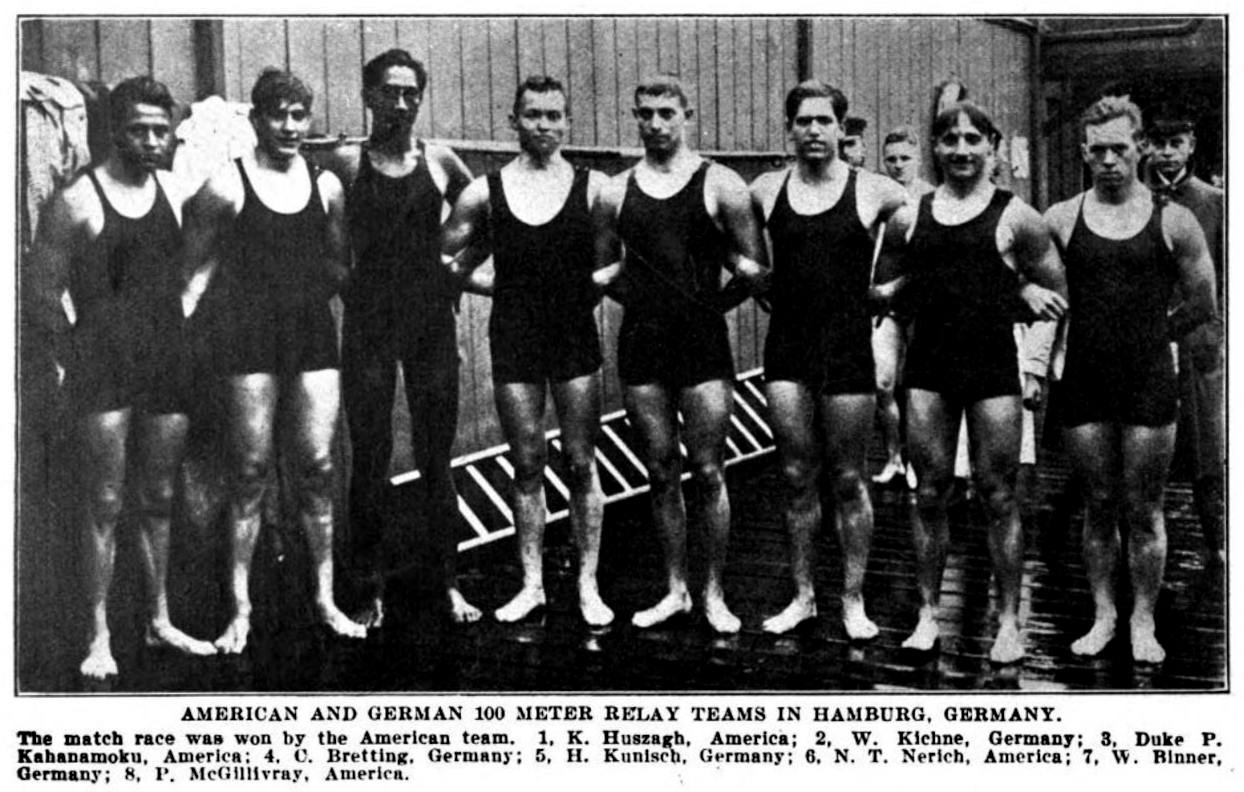
Huszagh posing with the winning 4x100 U.S. free relay team and German team in Hamburg

A few weeks after the Olympics, in August, 1912, Huszagh swam with the winning U.S. National team in the 100-meter relay against the team from Germany at the International Meet in Hamburg sponsored by the Association of Swimming Clubs of Hamburg in August 1912. Huszagh swam with American team members Duke Kahanamoku, Nicholas T. Nerich, and Perry McGillivrey. The American team won with a combined time of 4:29 with the German team finishing the relay five seconds later with a time of 4:34 seconds. Huszagh swam a time of 1:09.6 for his 100 meter leg. In the 4x100 Medley relay, the American team also won, but by a far closer margin of 2 seconds.

=== Later life ===
Huszagh married Frances Kleinsteuber at her home in St. Joseph Township, Michigan, on April 29, 1916. The couple met at a Northern Wisconsin Lake, where Huszagh was impressed that Frances could not swim, and did not discuss his background as a championship swimmer. Frances was the daughter of the head of the combined police and fire alarm system of her city. The couple would have one child. One week earlier, Huszagh, while representing the Chicago Athletic Association, had swum in a meet against the Yale University swim team in Chicago where the Chicago Club won soundly.

Huszagh was later involved in the founding of the town of Kildeer, Illinois, along with the help of his family. He worked as a Director for the Hygrade Oil Company while living in Stamford, Connecticut, and later as an executive with New York's American Mineral Spirits Company, serving as president before retiring. Stamford is 34 miles outside of New York City, and Huszagh may have commuted to New York City area positions from his home in Stamford.

He died on January 11, 1950 at his winter home in Delray Beach, Florida of an apparent heart attack, after arriving there in December.

== See also ==
- List of Northwestern University alumni
- List of Olympic medalists in swimming (men)
- World record progression 4 × 200 metres freestyle relay
