= Binner (surname) =

Binner is a surname. Notable people with the surname include:

- Hermes Binner (1943–2020), Argentine politician
- Walther Binner (1891–1971), German freestyle swimmer

== See also ==
- Binner, nickname of Josh Binstock (born 1981), Canadian volleyball player
