= Neville Hill =

Neville Hill may refer to

- Neville Hill, area of Leeds, UK
  - Neville Hill depot, a train depot in Leeds, UK, also Neville Hill sidings, junction etc.
- George Neville Hill, New Zealand long distance runner
