= Australasia at the Olympics =

- Australasian Olympic Flag
- IOC code: ANZ
- Medals Ranked 85th: Gold 3 Silver 4 Bronze 5 Total 12

Summer appearances
- 1908; 1912

Other related appearances
- Australia (1896–1904, 1920–pres.); New Zealand (1920–pres.)

Australasia was a combined team of athletes from Australia and the Dominion of New Zealand that competed together at the 1908 and 1912 Summer Olympics. When the Olympic Games resumed in 1920 after World War I, the two nations sent separate teams to the Games, and have done so ever since.

== Timeline of participation ==
Olympic Year/s	Teams	
1896–1900	Australia	
1904	Australia	
1908–1912	Australasia	
1920–present	Australia	New Zealand

== Medal tables ==
=== Medals by Summer Games ===
Games	Athletes	Gold	Silver	Bronze	Total	Rank
(United Kingdom) 1908 London	32	1	2	2	5	11
(Sweden) 1912 Stockholm	26	2	2	3	7	12
Total (2/30)	58	3	4	5	12	85

=== Medals by sport ===
Sport	Gold	Silver	Bronze	Total
Swimming	2	3	3	8
Rugby union	1	0	0	1
Boxing	0	1	0	1
Athletics	0	0	1	1
Tennis	0	0	1	1
Totals (5 entries)	3	4	5	12

== List of medalists ==
The Australasia team won a total of twelve medals in the two Olympiads in which they competed, mostly in swimming. One New Zealander won a medal in 1908 (Harry Kerr a bronze in athletics), and two New Zealanders (Malcolm Champion a gold in swimming, Anthony Wilding a bronze in tennis) won medals in 1912; all other medalists for Australasia were Australians.

Medal	Name	Games	Sport	Event
Gold	Australia national team^{1}	1908 London	Rugby union	Men's competition
Silver	Snowy Baker	1908 London	Boxing	Men's middleweight
Silver	Frank Beaurepaire	1908 London	Swimming	Men's 400 m freestyle
Bronze	Harry Kerr	1908 London	Athletics	Men's 3500 m walk
Bronze	Frank Beaurepaire	1908 London	Swimming	Men's 1500 m freestyle
Gold	Fanny Durack	1912 Stockholm	Swimming	Women's 100 m freestyle
Gold	Cecil Healy; Malcolm Champion; Leslie Boardman; Harold Hardwick	1912 Stockholm	Swimming	Men's 4 × 200 m freestyle relay
Silver	Cecil Healy	1912 Stockholm	Swimming	Men's 100 m freestyle
Silver	Mina Wylie	1912 Stockholm	Swimming	Women's 100 m freestyle
Bronze	Harold Hardwick	1912 Stockholm	Swimming	Men's 1500 m freestyle
Bronze	Harold Hardwick	1912 Stockholm	Swimming	Men's 400 m freestyle
Bronze	Anthony Wilding	1912 Stockholm	Tennis	Men's indoor singles

^{1} Rugby players who competed at the 1908 Games: Phil Carmichael, Charles Russell, Daniel Carroll, Jack Hickey, Frank Smith, Chris McKivat, Arthur McCabe, Thomas Griffen, Jumbo Barnett, Patrick McCue, Sydney Middleton, Tom Richards, Malcolm McArthur, Charles McMurtrie, Robert Craig

== See also ==
- Australia at the Olympics
- New Zealand at the Olympics
