= Swimming at the 1912 Summer Olympics – Men's 100 metre freestyle =

Men's 100 metre freestyle at the Games of the V Olympiad
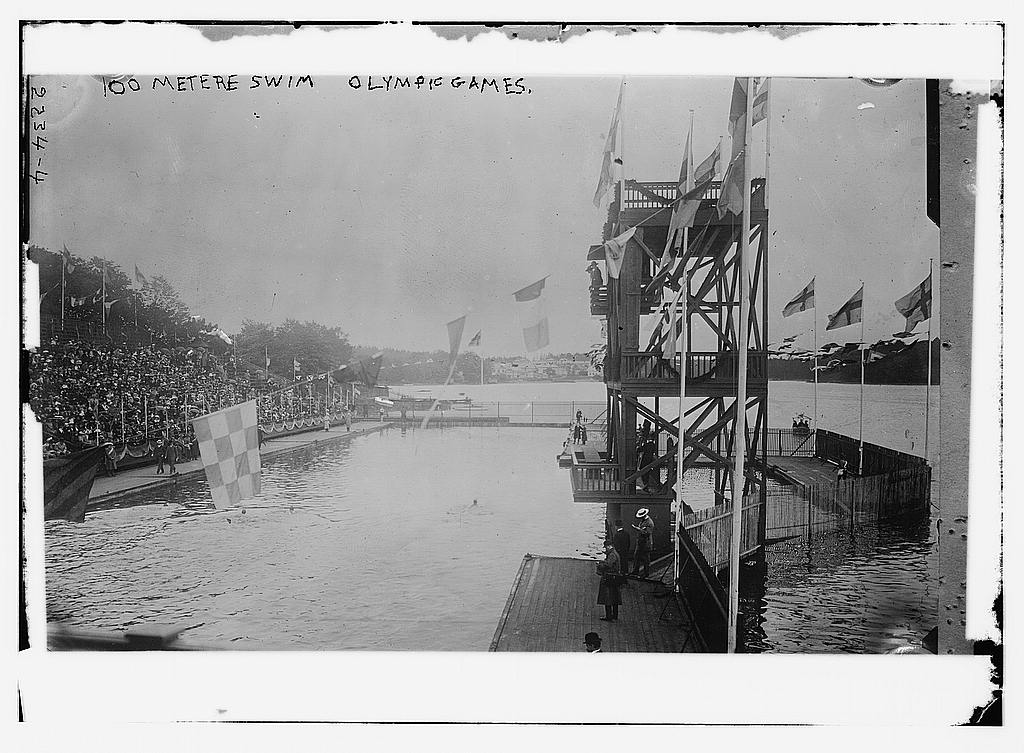
- 100 metre freestyle at the 1912 Games
- Venue: Djurgårdsbrunnsviken
- Dates: 6 July 1912 (heats); 7 July 1912 (quarterfinals & semifinals 1 and 2); 9 July 1912 (semifinal 3); 10 July 1912 (final)
- Competitors: 34 from 12 nations
- Winning time: 1:03.4

Medalists
1st place, gold medalist(s)		Duke Kahanamoku; United States
2nd place, silver medalist(s)		Cecil Healy; Australasia
3rd place, bronze medalist(s)		Ken Huszagh; United States

The men's 100 metre freestyle was a swimming event held as part of the swimming at the 1912 Summer Olympics programme. It was the fourth appearance of the event, which had not been featured at the 1900 Games. The competition was held from Saturday July 6, 1912, to Wednesday July 10, 1912. Thirty-four swimmers from twelve nations competed. The event was won by Duke Kahanamoku of the United States, the nation's second consecutive victory in the event (tying Hungary for most all-time). Cecil Healy took silver, the only medal in the event for Australasia, the short-lived joint team of Australia and New Zealand. Another American, Ken Huszagh, took bronze.

== Background ==
This was the fourth appearance of the men's 100 metre freestyle (including the 100 yard event in 1904 but excluding the Intercalated Games in 1906). The event has been held at every Summer Olympics except 1900 (when the shortest freestyle was the 200 metres), though the 1904 version was measured in yards rather than metres.

One of the four finalists from 1908 returned: bronze medalist Harald Julin of Sweden. Charles Daniels, the defending gold medalist who had also won at the 1906 Intercalated Games and taken silver at the 1904 Olympics, had retired. The favorite was Kurt Bretting of Germany, who had broken Daniels' world record earlier in 1912. An intriguing entrant was the Hawaiian Duke Kahanamoku, rumored to have posted phenomenal times which were unverified because of the distance from the American mainland.

Germany, Norway, and Russia each made their debut in the event. Hungary and the United States each made their fourth appearance, having competed at each edition of the event to date.

== Competition format ==
The rules for the swimming events provided that each event would consist of heats, a final, and "a sufficient number of intermediate heats in proportion to the number of competitors." This led to confusion, as the organizers declared that there should be two intermediate rounds (for a total of four rounds) while the American team believed that there would only be one before the final and consequently did not appear for the semifinals. After some negotiation, a four-round competition was held, with a special heat in the third round for competitors who had missed races due to the confusion.

For each round, the top two swimmers in each heat advanced to the next round, along with the fastest third-place swimmer. In the case of a tie, all tied swimmers would advance (swim-offs would only be used in the final). Each race consisted of a single length of the 100-meter course, and any stroke could be used.

== Records ==
These were the standing world and Olympic records (in minutes) prior to the 1912 Summer Olympics.

World record	1:02.4	(Germany) Kurt Bretting	Brussels (BEL)	April 6, 1912
Olympic Record	1:05.6	(United States) Charles Daniels	London (GBR)	July 20, 1908
Olympic Record	1:02.8(*)	(Hungary) Zoltán Halmay	St. Louis (USA)	September 5, 1904

(*) 100 yards (= 91.44 m)

In the fourth heat Perry McGillivray set a new Olympic record with 1:04.8 minutes. In the fifth heat Duke Kahanamoku bettered the Olympic record of 1:02.6 minutes. Finally Duke Kahanamoku improved the Olympic record with a time of 1:02.4 minutes in the third semifinal heat.

== Schedule ==
Date	Time	Round
Saturday, 6 July 1912	19:00	Heats
Sunday, 7 July 1912	13:30; 20:00	Quarterfinals; Semifinals 1 and 2
Tuesday, 9 July 1912		Semifinal 3
Wednesday, 10 July 1912		Final

== Results ==
=== Heats ===
The fastest two in each heat advanced. A tie for second in the seventh heat resulted in both swimmers advancing. In addition, the fastest third-place swimmer from across the heats also qualified for the quarterfinals.

==== Heat 1 ====
Rank	Swimmer	Nation	Time	Notes
1	László Beleznai	Hungary	1:08.0	Q
2	Robert Andersson	Sweden	1:09.4	Q
3	Andreas Asimakopoulos	Greece	1:15.4	
4	Herbert von Kuhlberg	Russia	Unknown	

==== Heat 2 ====
Rank	Swimmer	Nation	Time	Notes
1	Kurt Bretting	Germany	1:07.0	Q
2	Paul Radmilovic	Great Britain	1:10.4	Q
3	Theodore Tartakover	Australasia	1:12.2	
4	Jules Wuyts	Belgium	1:13.6	

==== Heat 3 ====
Rank	Swimmer	Nation	Time	Notes
1	Leslie Boardman	Australasia	1:06.0	Q
2	Nicholas Nerich	United States	1:07.6	Q
3	John Derbyshire	Great Britain	1:09.2	
4–6	Davide Baiardo	Italy	Unknown	
4–6	Walther Binner	Germany	Unknown	
4–6	Alajos Kenyery	Hungary	Unknown	

==== Heat 4 ====
Rank	Swimmer	Nation	Time	Notes
1	Perry McGillivray	United States	1:04.8	Q, OR
2	Cecil Healy	Australasia	1:05.2	Q
3	Ken Huszagh	United States	1:06.2	q
4	Erik Andersson	Sweden	1:13.0	
5	Georg Kunisch	Germany	Unknown	

==== Heat 5 ====
Rank	Swimmer	Nation	Time	Notes
1	Duke Kahanamoku	United States	1:02.6	Q, OR
2	William Longworth	Australasia	1:05.2	Q
3	Harry Hebner	United States	1:10.4	
4	Gérard Meister	France	1:16.6	

==== Heat 6 ====
Rank	Swimmer	Nation	Time	Notes
1	Harold Hardwick	Australasia	1:05.8	Q
2	Max Ritter	Germany	1:08.0	Q
3	Herman Meyboom	Belgium	1:15.4	
4	James Reilly	United States	Unknown	

==== Heat 7 ====
Rank	Swimmer	Nation	Time	Notes
1	Walter Ramme	Germany	1:10.2	Q
2	Harald Julin	Sweden	1:11.8	Q
2	Mario Massa	Italy	1:11.8	Q
4	John Johnsen	Norway	1:19.2	

==== Heat 8 ====
Rank	Swimmer	Nation	Time	Notes
1	Erik Bergqvist	Sweden	1:13.4	Q
2	Georges Rigal	France	1:17.8	Q
3	László Szentgróthy	Hungary	Unknown	

=== Quarterfinals ===
Again, the top two in each heat advanced along with the fastest loser overall. Four of the qualified swimmers did not take part in their quarterfinal heats, and a fifth (Massa) did not appear due to a misunderstanding. Massa was later allowed to take part in the semifinals.

==== Quarterfinal 1 ====
Rank	Swimmer	Nation	Time	Notes
1	Kurt Bretting	Germany	1:04.2	Q
2	William Longworth	Australasia	1:05.2	Q
3	Harold Hardwick	Australasia	1:06.0	
4	Robert Andersson	Sweden	1:10.0	
—	László Beleznai	Hungary	DNS	
—	Georges Rigal	France	DNS	

==== Quarterfinal 2 ====
Rank	Swimmer	Nation	Time	Notes
1	Duke Kahanamoku	United States	1:03.8	Q
2	Walter Ramme	Germany	1:07.8	Q
3	Nicholas Nerich	United States	1:08.8	
3	Max Ritter	Germany	1:08.8	
—	Erik Bergqvist	Sweden	DNS	
—	Harald Julin	Sweden	DNS	

==== Quarterfinal 3 ====
Rank	Swimmer	Nation	Time	Notes
1	Ken Huszagh	United States	1:04.2	Q
2	Perry McGillivray	United States	1:04.4	Q
3	Cecil Healy	Australasia	1:04.8	q
4	Leslie Boardman	Australasia	1:05.4	
5	Paul Radmilovic	Great Britain	1:19.0	
—	Mario Massa	Italy	DNS	q*

=== Semifinals ===
Further confusion struck the semifinals. Under the belief that the second round of the competition had been the semifinals, the American swimmers did not appear for the third round. This led to both semifinals being essentially walkovers, as the first had three swimmers and the second only one. Since the top two swimmers of each and the fastest third-place swimmer would advance, all four competitors had secured a place in the final before entering the water. Longworth swam in the first heat, despite suffering from what the official report referred to as "suppuration in the head", after swimming in a local bay and receiving a severe ear infection.

Healy met with the organisers and argued for the Americans to be allowed to swim in their own heat, due to a belief that any win without Kahanamoku competing, would be a hollow victory. The jury for the event then met and determined that a third heat should be held under special rules. If the winner of the extra heat were to beat the time set by the third-place swimmer of the first heat (1:06.2, a stiff pace but one which all three Americans had beat during the quarterfinals), he and the second-place finisher would advance. If the mark were not bettered, none of the swimmers from the third heat would advance. Massa, who had missed the quarterfinals due to a misunderstanding, was also allowed to start in the extra semifinal.

In the third heat, Kahanamoku not only beat Longworth's time, thus qualifying himself and Huszagh for the final, but bettered his own Olympic record which he had set in the first round. Huszagh out-touched McGillivray by a "hand's breadth" to take second place and the final qualification spot, though both finished well behind Kahanamoku and their own previous times. Massa did not finish the race.

==== Semifinal 1 ====
Rank	Swimmer	Nation	Time	Notes
1	Cecil Healy	Australasia	1:05.6	Q
2	Walter Ramme	Germany	1:05.8	Q
3	William Longworth	Australasia	1:06.2	q

==== Semifinal 2 ====
Rank	Swimmer	Nation	Time	Notes
1	Kurt Bretting	Germany	1:04.6	Q

==== Semifinal 3 ====
Rank	Swimmer	Nation	Time	Notes
1	Duke Kahanamoku	United States	1:02.4	Q, =WR
2	Ken Huszagh	United States	1:06.2	Q
3	Perry McGillivray	United States	1:06.2	
—	Mario Massa	Italy	DNF	

=== Final ===
Longworth was unable to continue competing due to illness and did not start in the final.

Kahanamoku was clearly in control by the halfway point, with a tight race between Huszagh, Ramme, and Bretting for the next three spots with Healy close behind them. Healy overtook the other three near the finish to win the silver medal. Ramme fell back to fifth while Huszagh and Bretting finished separated by "[o]nly a decimetre".

Rank	Swimmer	Nation	Time	Notes
1st place, gold medalist(s)	Duke Kahanamoku	United States	1:03.4	
2nd place, silver medalist(s)	Cecil Healy	Australasia	1:04.6	
3rd place, bronze medalist(s)	Ken Huszagh	United States	1:05.6	
4	Kurt Bretting	Germany	1:05.8	
5	Walter Ramme	Germany	1:06.4	
6	William Longworth	Australasia	DNS	

== Results summary ==
Rank	Swimmer	Nation	Heats	Quarterfinals	Semifinals	Final	Notes
1st place, gold medalist(s)	Duke Kahanamoku	United States	1:02.6	1:03.8	1:02.4	1:03.4	
2nd place, silver medalist(s)	Cecil Healy	Australasia	1:05.2	1:04.8	1:05.6	1:04.6	
3rd place, bronze medalist(s)	Ken Huszagh	United States	1:06.2	1:04.2	1:06.2	1:05.6	
4	Kurt Bretting	Germany	1:07.0	1:04.2	1:04.6	1:05.8	
5	Walter Ramme	Germany	1:10.2	1:07.8	1:05.8	1:06.4	
6	William Longworth	Australasia	1:05.2	1:05.2	1:06.2	DNS	
7	Perry McGillivray	United States	1:04.8	1:04.4	1:06.2	Did not advance	
8	Mario Massa	Italy	1:11.8	DNS	DNF	Did not advance	To semifinals by dispensation
9	Leslie Boardman	Australasia	1:06.0	1:05.4	did not advance		
10	Harold Hardwick	Australasia	1:05.8	1:06.0	did not advance		
11	Nicholas Nerich	United States	1:07.6	1:08.8	did not advance		
11	Max Ritter	Germany	1:08.0	1:08.8	did not advance		
13	Robert Andersson	Sweden	1:09.4	1:10.0	did not advance		
14	Paul Radmilovic	Great Britain	1:10.4	1:19.0	did not advance		
15	László Beleznai	Hungary	1:08.0	DNS	did not advance		
15	Erik Bergqvist	Sweden	1:13.4	DNS	did not advance		
15	Harald Julin	Sweden	1:11.8	DNS	did not advance		
15	Georges Rigal	France	1:17.8	DNS	did not advance		
19	John Derbyshire	Great Britain	1:09.2	did not advance			
20	Harry Hebner	United States	1:10.4	did not advance			
21	Theodore Tartakover	Australasia	1:12.2	did not advance			
22	Erik Andersson	Sweden	1:13.0	did not advance			
23	Jules Wuyts	Belgium	1:13.6	did not advance			
24	Andreas Asimakopoulos	Greece	1:15.4	did not advance			
24	Herman Meyboom	Belgium	1:15.4	did not advance			
26	Gérard Meister	France	1:16.6	did not advance			
27	John Johnsen	Norway	1:19.2	did not advance			
28	László Szentgróthy	Hungary	Unknown	did not advance			3rd in heat
29	James Reilly	United States	Unknown	did not advance			4th in heat
29	Herbert von Kuhlberg	Russia	Unknown	did not advance			4th in heat
31	Davide Baiardo	Italy	Unknown	did not advance			4th to 6th in heat
31	Walther Binner	Germany	Unknown	did not advance			4th to 6th in heat
31	Alajos Kenyery	Hungary	Unknown	did not advance			4th to 6th in heat
34	Georg Kunisch	Germany	Unknown	did not advance			5th in heat

== Notes ==
- Bergvall, Erik, ed. (1913). The Official Report of the Olympic Games of Stockholm 1912. Translated by Adams-Ray, Edward. Stockholm: Wahlström & Widstrand.
- Wudarski, Pawel (1999). "Wyniki Igrzysk Olimpijskich" (in Polish).
