= Cecil Healy =

Australian swimmer (1881–1918)

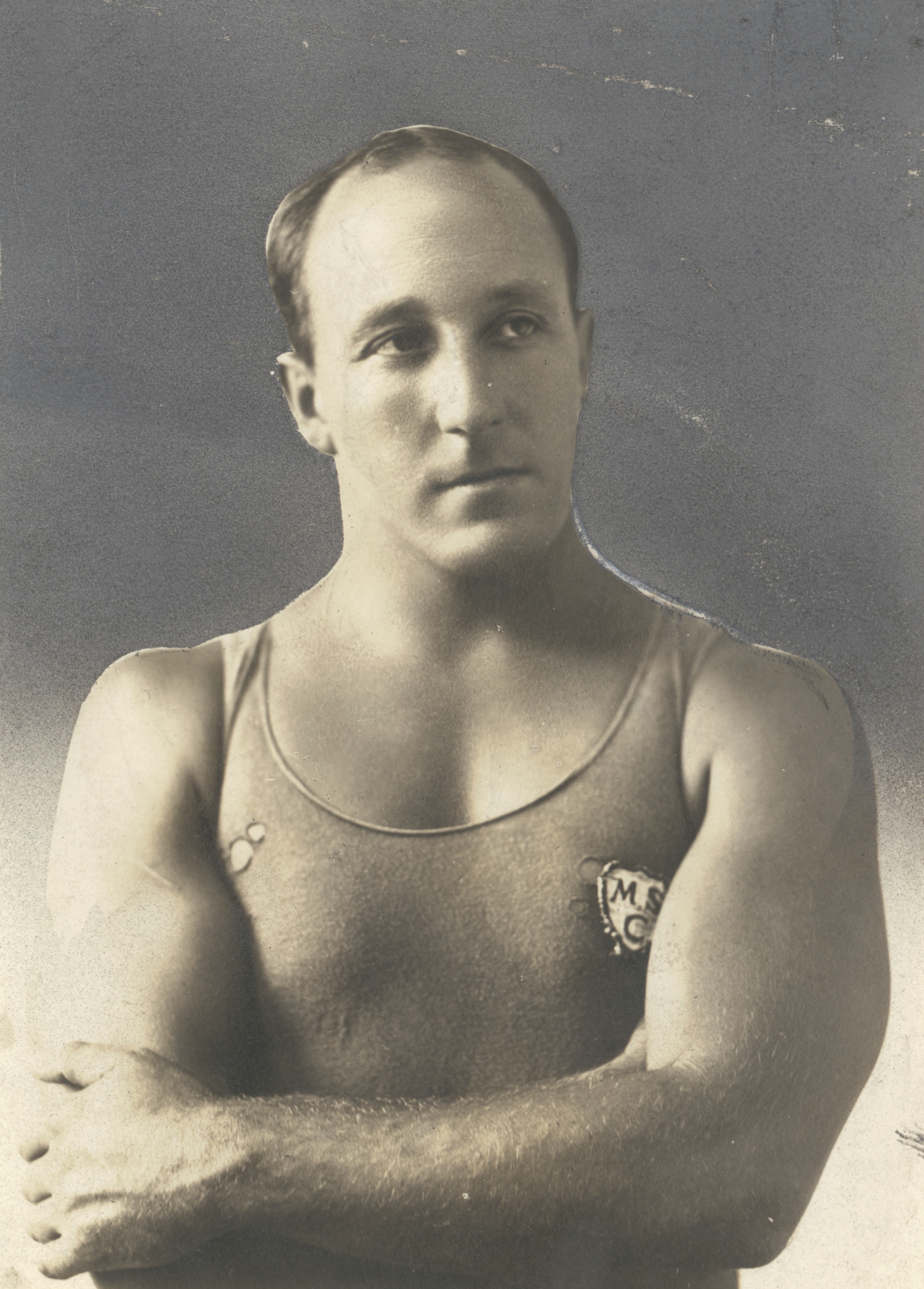

Personal information
- Full name: Cecil Patrick Healy
- Nationality: Australian
- Born: 28 November 1881 Darlinghurst, New South Wales
- Died: 29 August 1918 (aged 36) Somme, France

Sport
- Sport: Swimming
- Strokes: Freestyle
- Club: East Sydney ASC
Medal record
Men's swimming
Representing Australasia
Olympic Games
| Gold medal – first place | 1912 Stockholm | 4×200 m freestyle |
| Silver medal – second place | 1912 Stockholm | 100 m freestyle |
Representing Australia
Intercalated Games
| Bronze medal – third place | 1906 Athens | 100 m freestyle |

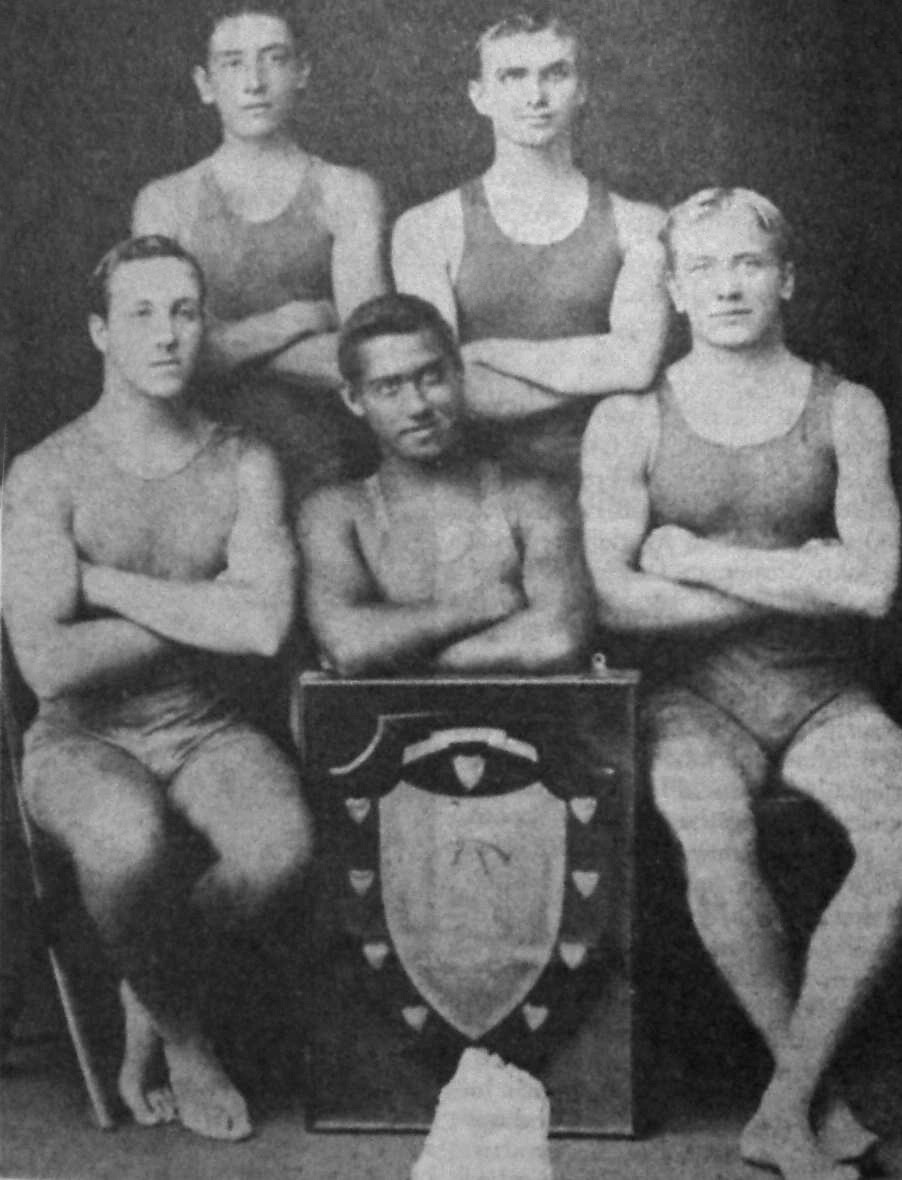
Healy, seated at left, with Manly Swimming Club teammates

Cecil Patrick Healy (28 November 1881 – 29 August 1918) was an Australian freestyle swimmer of the 1900s and 1910s, who won silver in the 100 m freestyle at the 1912 Summer Olympics in Stockholm. He also won gold in the 4 × 200 m freestyle relay. He was killed in the First World War at the Somme during an attack on a German trench. Healy was the second swimmer behind Frederick Lane to represent Australia in Swimming and has been allocated the number "2" by Swimming Australia on a list of all Australians who have represented Australia at an Open International Level.

== Early years ==
The son of a barrister, Healy was born in Darlinghurst, an inner-city suburb of Sydney, but moved with his family to the rural town of Bowral where he received his primary schooling. He moved to Sydney in 1896, joining the East Sydney Swimming Club, of which Frederick Lane was also a member. Healy was also a member of the North Steyne Surf Lifesaving Club. Cecil Healy attended St Aloysius' College in Sydney in 1896 and is remembered there in the Roll of Honour and via the Cecil Healy plate which is given out to the winner of the inter-house swimming competition.

== Swimming career ==
In 1904, Healy posted the fastest-ever time in the 100 yd freestyle, 58s, but there were no official world records at the time. In 1905, his time of 58s in the 110 yd freestyle at the Australasian Championships equalled the world record to earn him his first Australasian title. He was a proponent of the new crawl stroke, raising eyebrows among classicists who perceived it to be inelegant.

In 1906, Healy was sent to the 1906 Intercalated Olympics, one of only five athletes for whom the necessary funding was allocated. At the Games in Athens, Healy came third in the 100 m freestyle behind the United States' Charles Daniels and Hungary's Zoltan Halmay. Halmay and Daniels were the gold and silver medallists, respectively, at the 1904 Summer Olympics.

After the Games, Healy toured Europe, giving many Europeans the first chance to see the crawl stroke; he competed in Hamburg, winning the Kaiser's Cup, and also competed in Belgium, Netherlands and Britain. He won the 220 yd British Championships but was thwarted by Daniels in the 100 yd event.

Returning to Australia, Healy missed the Australian season. In 1908, he won the 110 yd freestyle but was unable to attend the 1908 Summer Olympics due to a lack of funds. In 1909 and 1910, he again successfully defended his Australian championships. In 1911, Healy inflicted the first defeat on Frank Beaurepaire in any race after beating him in a 440 yd race. However, that year, Harold Hardwick claimed Healy's 110 yd titles.

In 1912, Healy came third in the 110 yd, 220 yd, and 880 yd events at the Australasian titles to qualify for the Australasian team at the 1912 Summer Olympics. (At the time, Australia sent a combined team with New Zealand.)

In Stockholm, Healy entered the 100 m event with fellow Australian Bill Longworth and American Duke Kahanamoku. All three qualified for the semi-final, with Kahanamoku clearly the quickest. Healy and Longworth then qualified from the first semifinal, but the three Americans, who were scheduled to qualify in the second semi-final, did not due to an error by their team management. However, Healy intervened and assisted in an appeal to allow the Americans to swim another special race in order to qualify for the final. Despite protestations from other delegations, the Americans were allowed a separate race, with Kahanamoku qualifying for the final. In the final, Kahanamoku won easily, by 1.2s, over a bodylength, with Healy in second place. Healy's sportsmanship effectively cost him the gold medal.

In the 400 m freestyle, Healy set a world record in his heat, but this was improved in the semifinals by George Hodgson of Canada and Hardwick by over ten seconds. Healy finished fourth in the final. In the 4 × 200 m freestyle, he combined with Hardwick, Leslie Boardman and Malcolm Champion to hold off the Kahanamoku-led Americans. After the Games, Healy toured Europe, where he lowered Beaurepaire's 220 yd world record by more than three seconds in Scotland, before retiring and returning to Australia.

Healy encouraged the practice of swimming daily for exercise and was active in lifesaving at Manly beach, winning the Royal Humane Society silver medal for saving numerous surfers.

== The Crawl Stroke ==
In March 1913, following an article he had written earlier that year on the history of "the crawl" for the Sunday Times, he published an important article in The Referee on the "crawl" stroke. In a slightly amended form, 20,000 copies of the article were later released, free of charge, in the United Kingdom, under the title The Crawl Stroke.

== Honor swimmer ==
Healy was inducted into the International Swimming Hall of Fame as an "Honor Swimmer" in 1981.

== Military career ==
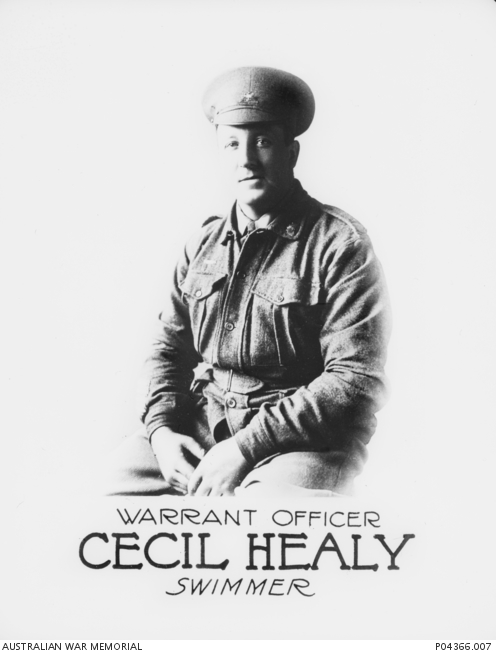
A military photograph of Healy.

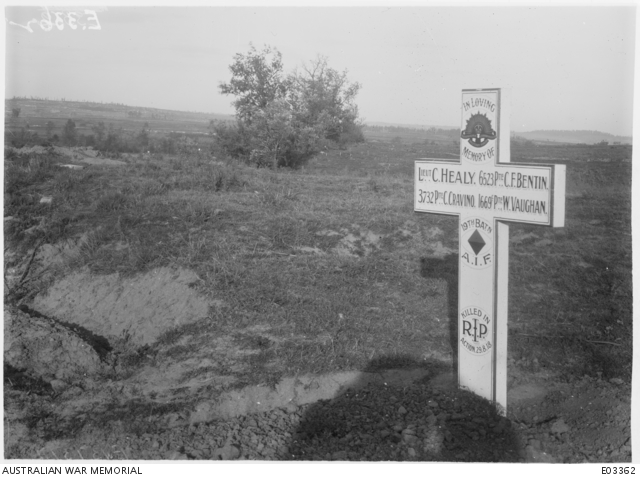
Healy's joint grave with three other soldiers. Mont St. Quentin is seen in the background on the far left.

In September 1915, Healy decided to enlist in the Australian Defence Force and served as a quartermaster sergeant in Egypt and France. After attending officer training in Cambridge, he became a second lieutenant in June 1918 in the 19th Sportsman's Battalion. He was killed in action on the Somme battlefront. Healy remains the only Australian Olympic Gold medallist to die on the battlefield. He was buried at Assevillers New British Cemetery (France).

== Centenary ==
In 2017, fellow Australian Olympic gold medallist John Devitt and author Larry Writer travelled to France to research Healy's story. In 2018, the centenary of Healy's death, their book Cecil Healy: A Biography was launched by the Australian Olympic Committee's John Coates and Governor of New South Wales, General David Hurley at St Aloysius' College in Sydney. Another biography Hell and Highwater: Cecil Healy, Olympic Champion whose life was cut short by war by Rochelle Nichols, was launched at the Queenscliff Surf Life Saving Club by the Hon. Tony Abbott MP on 18 April 2018.

To mark the 100th anniversary of Healy's death, the Australian Olympic Committee announced a discretionary award, named in his honour, to be presented after the Olympic Games to an athlete who has shown exceptional sportsmanship. Decathlete Cedric Dubler was the inaugural recipient in 2022 for assisting compatriot and eventual Bronze Medalist Ashley Moloney at the 2020 Summer Olympics.

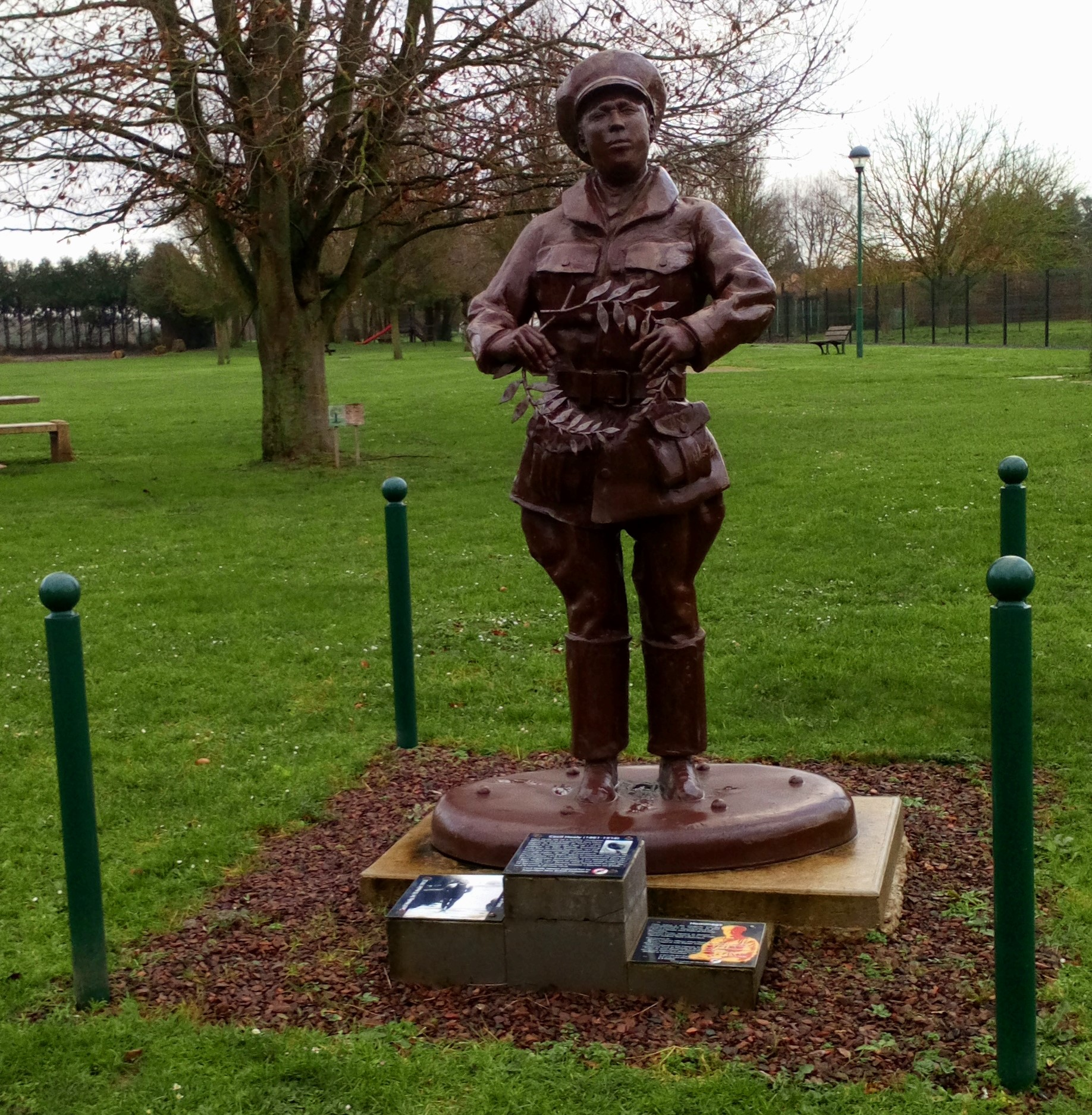
Monument to Cecil Healy

Also, in 2018, the French municipality of Assevillers honoured Healy and other Australian soldiers with a special ceremony and a statue of Healy.

== See also ==
- List of members of the International Swimming Hall of Fame
- List of Olympians killed in World War I
- List of Olympic medalists in swimming (men)
- World record progression 4 × 200 metres freestyle relay
