= Malcolm Champion =

New Zealand swimmer

Personal information
- Born: Malcolm Eadie Champion; 10 November 1883 Norfolk Island
- Died: 26 July 1939 (aged 56) Auckland, New Zealand

Sport
- Sport: Swimming
Medal record
Representing Australasia
Men's swimming
Gold medal – first place	1912 Stockholm	4x200 m freestyle relay

Malcolm Eadie Champion (10 November 1883 – 26 July 1939) was New Zealand's first Olympic gold medallist, and the first swimmer to represent New Zealand at an Olympic Games. He won a gold medal in the 4 × 200 m freestyle relay at the 1912 Summer Olympics in Stockholm, Sweden as part of a combined team with Australia, competing as Australasia.

== Background ==
Champion was born in 1882 in Norfolk Island (now an Australian territory but then a British colony). He moved to New Zealand as a teenager. His mother, Sarah Clara Quintal, descended from the Bounty mutineer Matthew Quintal. His father Captain William Nihill Champion was a sea captain who traded around the Pacific. Malcolm later worked on his father's ships and by the end of the 19th century was living in Auckland. He died on 26 July 1939 in Auckland, New Zealand.

== Titles ==
Between 1901 and 1914, Champion won thirty-two New Zealand national titles, at one point holding the titles for every distance between 220 yards (200 m) and one mile (1.6 km). Champion was suspended at the end of 1902 by the national swimming association for failing to pay registration fees and was allowed to re-enter the sport in the southern summer of 1907–08. His suspension has often wrongly been called a life ban for professionalism. In 1911 he was the long-distance champion of England on the Thames. He had also represented Australasia at the 1911 Festival of Empire at The Crystal Palace, an early forerunner to the Commonwealth Games, where he pulled out of the mile race.

== Olympics ==
Due to the financial difficulties faced by the New Zealand Olympic Committee, his swimming club had to fundraise for him and organize loans so he could travel to the 1912 Stockholm Olympics. At the Olympics, Champion carried the flag for the Australasian team. Champion was originally slated to compete in the 400 m and 1500 m freestyle events. He finished second in his 400 m heat behind Harold Hardwick and before finishing fourth in his semi-final to be eliminated. In the 1500 m event, he placed second in both his heat and semifinal, before abandoning in the final after 600 m.

An ear infection to Bill Longworth resulted in Champion being promoted to the 4 × 200 m freestyle relay team. In the final on 15 July, Champion swam the second leg, and started equal with the American swimmer after Cecil Healy's first leg before building up a 10 m lead in his leg. Les Boardman extended the lead to 15 m before Harold Hardwick held off Duke Kahanamoku to claim the gold medal in the world record time of 10:11.6. The final was the third time that a world record had been set in that event at the Stockholm games, the first two times occurring on 12 July with the United States team swimming 10:26.4, only to be bettered later that day by the Australasian team who swam 10:14.0 (the United States team won the silver medal in the final).

== Honours ==
Champion was New Zealand's only Olympic gold medalist in swimming until 1996, when Danyon Loader won in the 200 m and 400 m freestyle events at the Atlanta Olympics. In 1990 Champion became an inaugural inductee into the New Zealand Sports Hall of Fame. In 2005 the winning relay team was inducted into the Sport Australia Hall of Fame, making Champion the only non-Australian inductee.

Like Billy Savidan after him, he was for some years Custodian at Auckland's Tepid Baths, and the walls of his office were adorned with sketches of ships by him.

== See also ==
- List of Olympic medalists in swimming (men)
- World record progression 4 × 200 metres freestyle relay

== Sources ==
- Ron Palenski, Champion - New Zealand's first Olympic winner, published by the New Zealand Sports Hall of Fame, 1912.
- Palenski, Ron (2012). Champion - New Zealand's first Olympic winner. New Zealand Sports Hall of Fame. ISBN 978-0-473-21866-9.
- Andrews, Malcolm (2000). Australia at the Olympic Games. Sydney, New South Wales: ABC Books. pp. 81–82. ISBN 0-7333-0884-8.
- Howell, Max (1986). Aussie Gold. Albion, Queensland: Brooks Waterloo. pp. 31–32. ISBN 0-86440-680-0.
- McMillan, Neville (1993). New Zealand Sporting Legends: 27 Pre-War Sporting Heroes. Auckland: Moa Beckett. pp. 21–26. ISBN 1-869580-14-1.
