= Kurt Bretting =

German swimmer

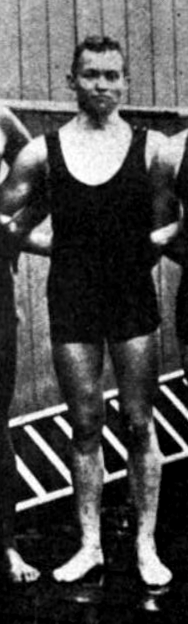
- In Hamburg, c. 1912

Personal information
- Born: 6 June 1892 Magdeburg, German Empire
- Died: 30 May 1918 (aged 25) Merville, France

Sport
- Country: Germany
- Sport: Swimming

Kurt Bretting (6 June 1892 – 30 May 1918) was a German freestyle swimmer who competed in the 1912 Summer Olympics.

He was born in Magdeburg and was killed in action in Merville, Nord, France during World War I.

In 1912 he finished fourth in the 100 metre freestyle event. He was also a member of the German relay team, which finished fourth in the 4x200 metre freestyle relay competition.

== See also ==
- List of Olympians killed in World War I
- World record progression 100 metres freestyle

Records
| Preceded by Charles Daniels | Men's 100 m freestyle World Record Holder; April 6, 1912 – July 20, 1912 | Succeeded by Duke Kahanamoku |
