= Georg Kunisch =

German swimmer

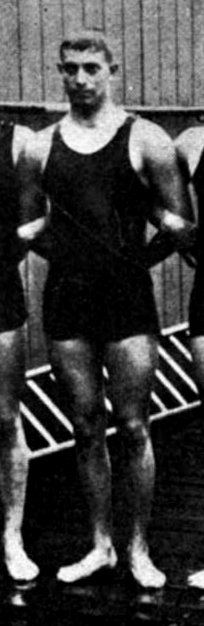
- In Hamburg, c. 1912
- Born: 21 April 1893; Breslau, German Empire
- Died: 1936 (aged 42–43); Breslau, Germany
- Occupation: Swimmer

Georg Kunisch (21 April 1893 – 1936) was a German freestyle swimmer who competed in the 1912 Summer Olympics. He was born and died in Breslau. In 1912, he was eliminated in the first round of the 100 metre freestyle event. He was also a member of the German relay team, which finished fourth in the 4x200 metre freestyle relay competition.
