= Mario Massa =

Italian swimmer (1892–1956)

Personal information
- Born: May 29, 1892 Nervi, Italy
- Died: February 16, 1956 (aged 63)

Sport
- Sport: Swimming

Luigi Paolo Mario Massa (29 May 1892 – 16 February 1956) was an Italian freestyle swimmer who competed in the 1908 Summer Olympics, in the 1912 Summer Olympics, and in the 1920 Summer Olympics. He was born in Nervi. In 1908, he was eliminated in the first round of the 400 metre freestyle event. Four years later, he was eliminated in the semi-finals of the 100 metre freestyle competition. He also participated in the 400 metre freestyle event and in the 1500 metre freestyle competition, but in both, he was eliminated in the first round. At the 1920 Games, he was a member of the Italian relay team, which finished fifth in the 4 x 200 metre freestyle relay competition. In the 100 metre freestyle event he was eliminated in the first round.
