= Walter Ramme =

German swimmer

Personal information
- Born: January 28, 1895 Braunschweig, German Empire

Sport
- Sport: Swimming

Walter Ramme (born January 28, 1895, date of death unknown) was a German freestyle swimmer who competed in the 1912 Summer Olympics. He competed for the sports club MTV Braunschweig and later won fifth place in the 100 metre freestyle event. In 1913 he emigrated to the United States of America.
