= Harry Hebner =

American swimmer (1891–1968)

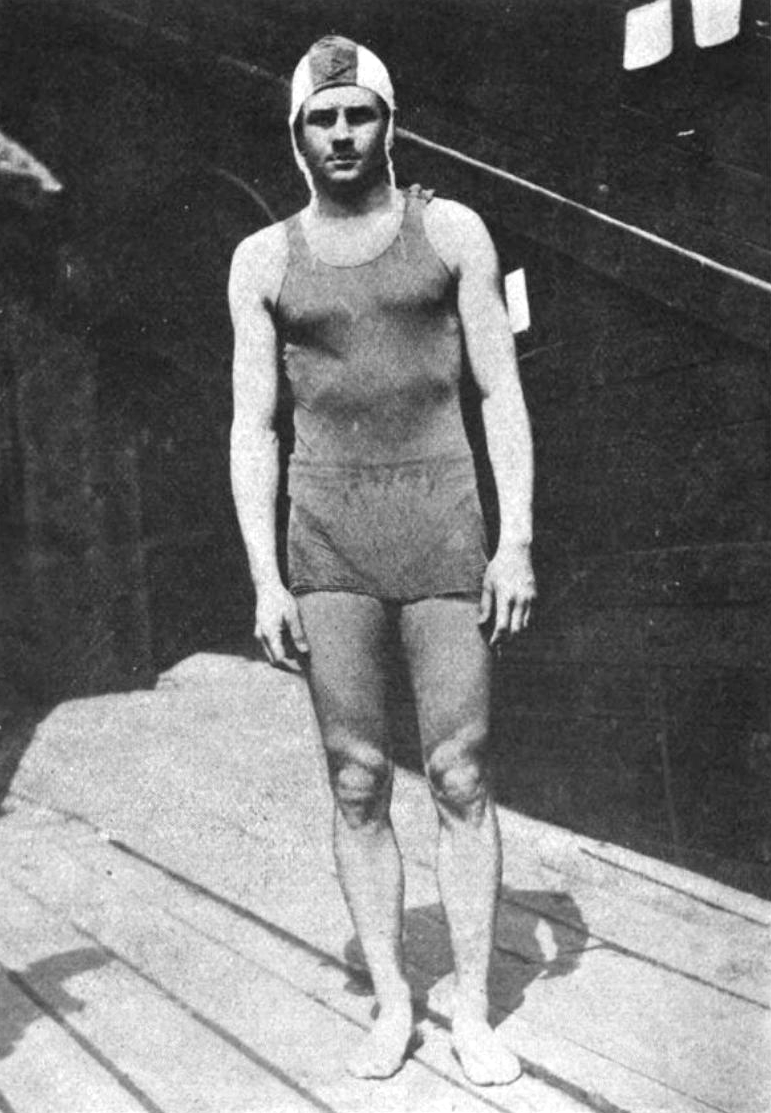
- Hebner at the 1912 Summer Olympics

Personal information
- Full name: Harry Joseph Hebner
- National team: United States
- Born: June 15, 1891 Chicago, Illinois, U.S.
- Died: October 12, 1968 (aged 77) Michigan City, Indiana, U.S.
- Height: 5 ft 11 in (1.80 m)

Sport
- Sport: Swimming
- Strokes: Backstroke, freestyle
- Club: Illinois Athletic Club (IAC)
- Coach: Bill Bachrach (IAC)
Medal record
Men's swimming
Representing the United States
Olympics
Gold medal – first place	1912 Stockholm	100 m backstroke
Silver medal – second place	1912 Stockholm	4×200 m freestyle
Bronze medal – third place	1908 London	4×200 m freestyle

Harry Joseph Hebner (June 15, 1891 – October 12, 1968) was an American competition swimmer and water polo player who competed at the 1908, 1912 and 1920 Summer Olympics.

Hebner swam for the Illinois Athletic Club under Hall of Fame Coach William Bachrach who also coached water polo for IAC. Other outstanding swimmers coached by Bachrach included 1924 gold medalist Sybil Bauer, the exceptional Olympian and film star Johnny Weissmuller, 1920 Olympic triple gold medalist Norman Ross, 1912 and 1920 Olympic medalist Perry McGillivray, and 1912 and 1920 Olympic participant Mike McDermott.

== Olympics ==
As part of the American men's 4×200-meter relay teams, he won a bronze medal in 1908 and a silver medal in 1912; in 1912 he also took the gold, winning the 100-meter backstroke event. In the 100-meter freestyle, he was eliminated in the semi-finals in 1908, and in the first round in 1912. In 1920 he was a member of the fourth-place American water polo team.

Between 1910 and 1917, Hebner held all world backstroke records and won seven consecutive U.S. National backstroke titles. In total, he won 35 national titles that spanned from the 50 to the 500 yard freestyle, and all of the existing backstroke distances. He was the captain of the Illinois Athletic club in both swimming and water polo. A leader and noted performer in water polo as well, between 1914 and 1924, his IAC Water Polo team won the U.S. Nationals five times.

== Honors ==
In 1968 he was inducted to the International Swimming Hall of Fame. In 1980, he was inducted into the USA Water Polo Hall of Fame.

He died in Michigan City, Indiana on October 12, 1968, and was buried at St. Boniface Catholic Cemetery in Chicago.

== See also ==
- List of members of the International Swimming Hall of Fame
- List of Olympic medalists in swimming (men)
- World record progression 4 × 200 metres freestyle relay
