= Georges Rigal =

French swimmer (1890–1974)

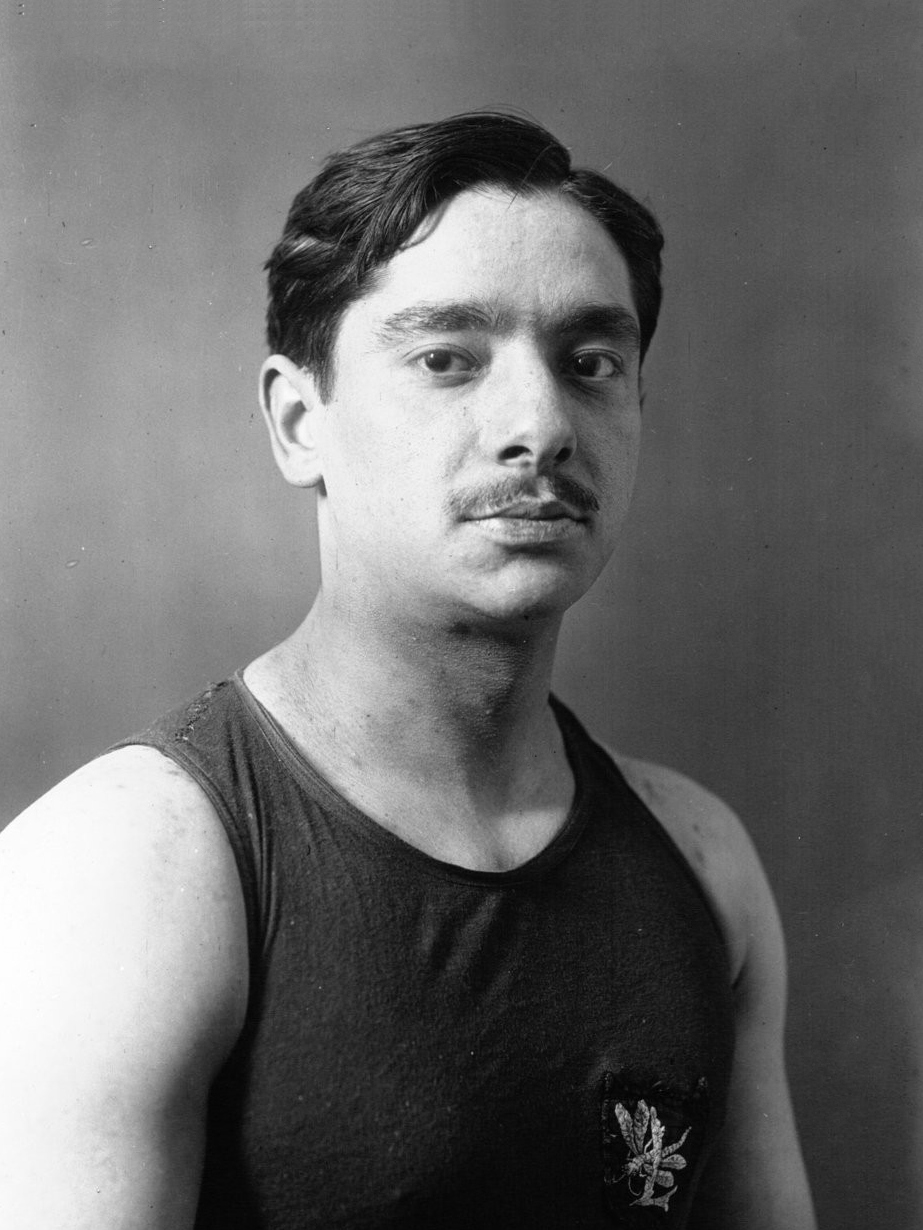
- Georges Rigal in 1914

Personal information
- Born: 6 January 1890 Paris, France
- Died: 25 March 1974 (aged 84) Saint-Maur-des-Fossés, France

Sport
- Sport: Water polo
- Club: Libellule de Paris
Medal record
Representing France
Olympic Games
Gold medal – first place	1924 Paris	Team competition

Georges Rigal (6 January 1890 – 25 March 1974) was a French water polo player and freestyle swimmer who competed at the 1912 and 1924 Summer Olympics.

In 1912 he was a member of the French water polo team which finished fifth in the Olympic water polo competition. He played one match. He also participated in the 100 metre freestyle event, but was eliminated in the first round. Twelve years later he won a gold medal with the French water polo team. He played all four matches and scored one goal.

== See also ==
- France men's Olympic water polo team records and statistics
- List of Olympic champions in men's water polo
- List of Olympic medalists in water polo (men)
