= Herbert von Kuhlberg =

Latvian swimmer (1893–1915)

Personal information
- Nationality: Latvian
- Born: 22 November 1893 Riga, Russian Empire
- Died: 12 September 1915 (aged 21)

Sport
- Sport: Swimming

Herbert von Kuhlberg (22 November 1893 – 12 September 1915) was a Latvian swimmer. He competed in the men's 100 metre freestyle event at the 1912 Summer Olympics for Russia. He was killed in action during World War I.
