= Max Ritter =

German swimmer

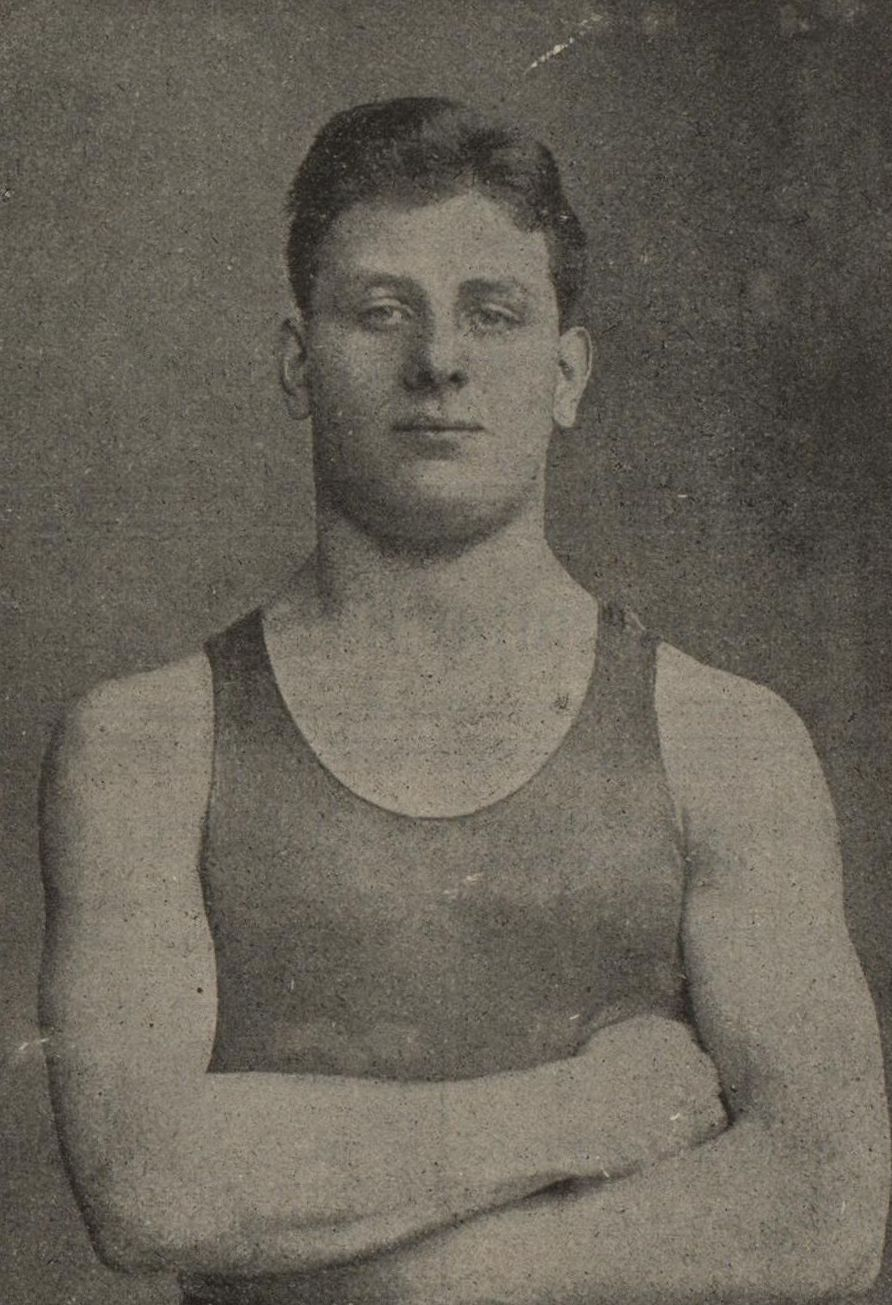
- Ritter in 1909

Personal information
- Born: November 7, 1886 Magdeburg, German Empire
- Died: May 24, 1974 (aged 87) Montgomery, Pennsylvania, United States

Sport
- Sport: Swimming

Richard Max Ritter (November 7, 1886 – May 24, 1974) was a German freestyle and backstroke swimmer who competed in the 1908 Summer Olympics and in the 1912 Summer Olympics.

== Biography ==
He was born in Magdeburg and died in Montgomery, Pennsylvania.

In 1908, he was eliminated in the semi-finals of the 100 metre backstroke competition.

Four years later, at the 1912 Olympics, he was eliminated in the quarter-finals of the 100 metre freestyle event. In the 400 metre freestyle competition, he won his heat in the first round and advanced to the next round but did not start in his semi-final heat. He was also a member of the German relay team, which finished fourth in the 4x200 metre freestyle relay event.

== See also ==
- List of members of the International Swimming Hall of Fame
