= László Beleznai =

Hungarian swimmer and water polo player

Personal information
- Full name: Beleznai László
- Nationality: Hungarian
- Born: November 16, 1892 Budapest
- Died: March 23, 1953 (aged 60) Budapest

Sport
- Sport: Swimming
- Strokes: Freestyle
- Club: Muegyetemi Atlétikai és Futball Club

László Beleznai (November 16, 1891 in Budapest – March 23, 1953 in Budapest) was a Hungarian water polo player and freestyle swimmer who competed in the 1912 Summer Olympics. He was a member of the Hungarian water polo team, which competed in the 1912 tournament.

Also, he was a member of the Hungarian 4x200 metre freestyle relay team, which qualified for the final, but did not compete. In the 100 metre freestyle event, he qualified for the quarterfinals but did not compete.
