= Nicholas Nerich =

American swimmer

- Nerich around 22, circa 1912

Personal information
- Full name: Nicholas Thomas Nerich
- Nickname: "Nick"
- National team: United States
- Born: November 13, 1893 New York, New York, U.S.
- Died: February 7, 1957 (aged 63) New York, New York, U.S.
- Spouse: Catherine F. Egan (1914)

Sport
- Sport: Swimming
- Events: 100, 220, 500 yard freestyle 100, 400-meter freestyle
- Strokes: Freestyle
- Club: New York Athletic Club

Nicholas "Nick" Thomas Nerich Sr. (November 13, 1893 – February 7, 1957) was an American competition swimmer who competed for the New York Athletic Club and represented the United States at the 1912 Summer Olympics.

== Early life ==
Nerich was born into a large family in New York City on November 13, 1893 to John J. Nerich and Hannah Delaney Nerich and swam for the New York Athletic Club in Amateur Athletic Union (AAU) competition.

== 1912 Stockholm Olympics ==
At the 1912 Olympics in Stockholm, Sweden, he competed in the semifinals of the men's 400-meter freestyle finishing seventh with a time of 5:51.0, the first American to complete the event. He also competed in the quarter-finals of the men's 100-meter freestyle tying for tenth with a time of 1:08.8.

=== Swimming achievements ===
At the height of his competitive career in 1913, he captured New York Metropolitan American Athletic Union titles in the 100, 220, and 500 yard freestyle events. His 100-yard time on January 4, 1913 at the New York City Metropolitan Championship at the NYAC pool was :59.4 seconds. He was also reputed to hold the half mile swimming championship by 1915. On February 7, 1914, he successfully defended his Metropolitan title in the 220-yard freestyle, swimming a 2:33.8 to take first place, finishing ahead of Joseph Wheatly by around six yards.

Nerich married Catherine F. Egan Nerich in 1914. She predeceased him in 1943.

He died in Astoria, Queens on February 7, 1957, and was buried at Mount Saint Mary Cemetery in Flushing, Queens. He was survived by around five children and twenty grandchildren. A Mass was held at St. Dominics Catholic Church on the morning of Monday, February 11.
