= Festival of Empire =

1911 event at The Crystal Palace in England

Coordinates: 51.421°N 0.072°W

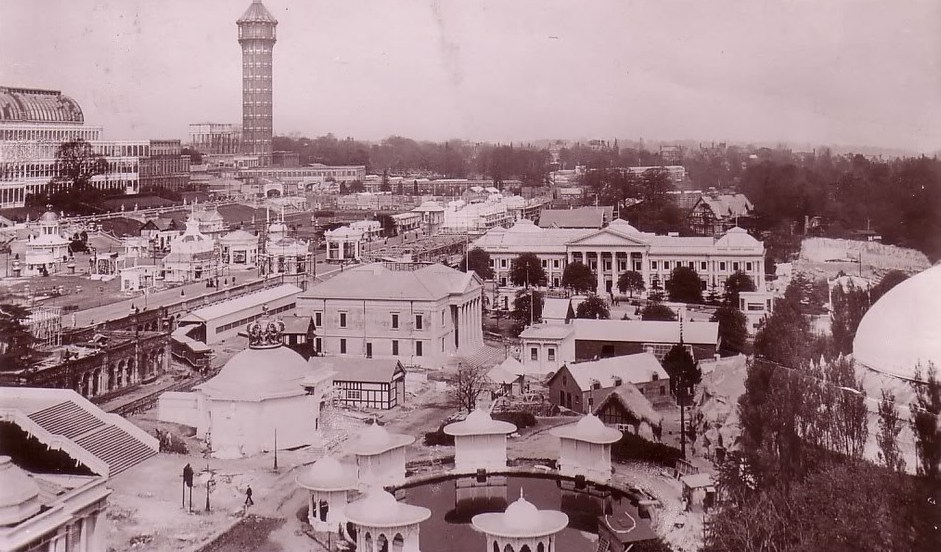
View from the Canadian replica Parliament Building of the Festival at the Crystal Palace

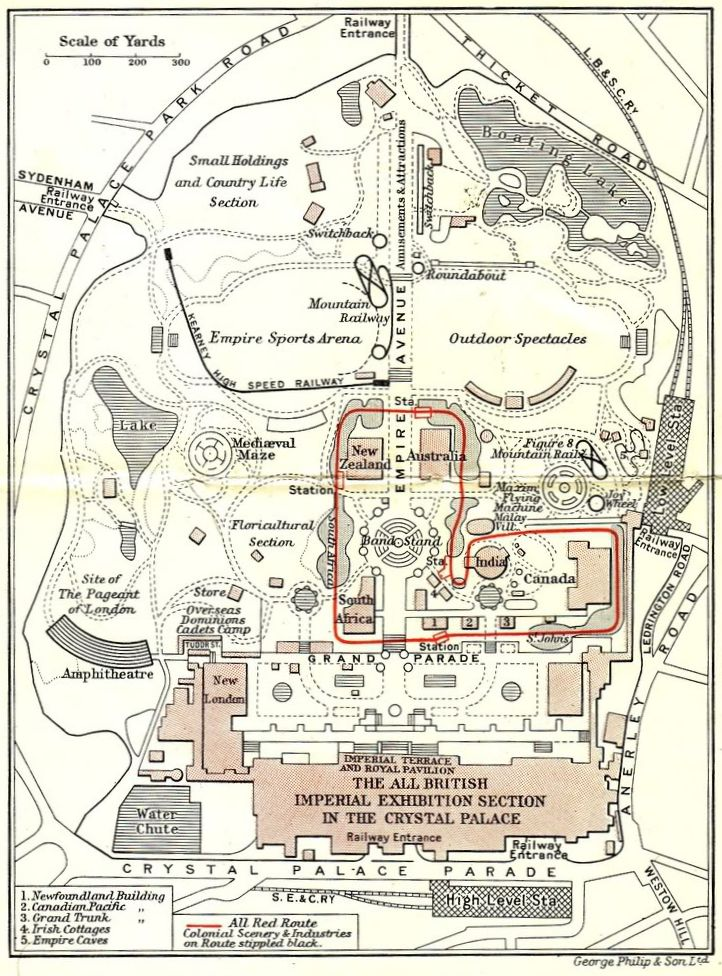
Map of the event

Festival of Empire was a major imperial exhibition held at London's Crystal Palace from 12 May to 1 October 1911, organized to celebrate the coronation of King George V and to showcase the cultural, industrial, and military accomplishments of the British Empire. It was the largest single event held at the Crystal Palace in London since its opening. The original intention had been that Edward VII would open it in 1910, however, this was postponed after his death shortly before the planned opening day. The Festival contained a display of landscapes and exhibits from the British Empire, mainly the dominion countries, to encourage emigration to those nations; and it contained a large scale pageant dramatising British history. It was described at the time as 'a social gathering of the British family' encouraging the 'firmer welding of those invisible bonds which hold together the greatest empire the world has ever known'.

== Context ==
Robert George Windsor-Clive, first Earl of Plymouth, Conservative government minister managed and promoted the Festival as a sub contracted event; it was nothing to do with the Crystal Palace company which was in receivership at the time. The 1911 Festival of Empire was one of many imperial events staged in the early twentieth century in Britain and around the Empire, following the 1909 Imperial International Exhibition at London's White City and running parallel to the 1911 Delhi Durbar in India and following the 1895 African Exhibition and 1905 Colonial and Indian Exhibition which also took place in Crystal Palace Park. The 1911 Festival of Empire was staged at the Crystal Palace at Sydenham Hill and had similar characteristics to the Great Exhibition, for which the palace was initially built, in that it displayed an array of products and exhibits from countries around the world and promoted a western industrial culture and pro-Empire view of the world.

== Festival Design ==
The 1911 Festival of Empire was a considerable logistical exercise and it exploited much of the latest technology of the time to create a simulation of the landscapes around the British Empire for the British public to experience on home ground. This involved masses of painted canvas and re-landscaped parts of the park.

=== Buildings ===
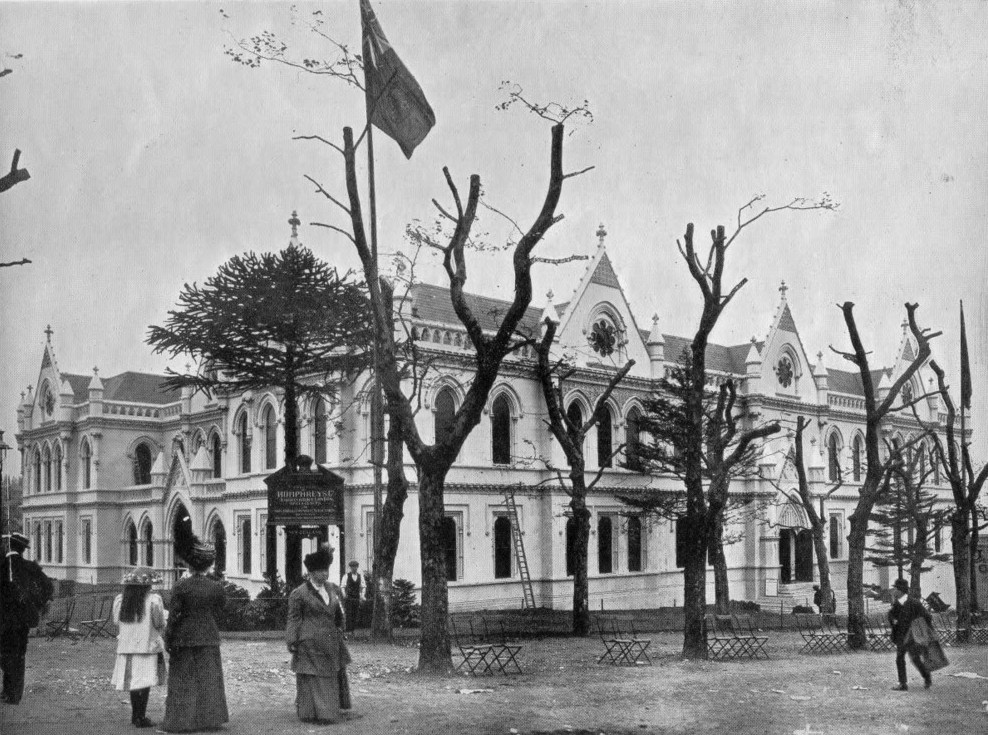
New Zealand replica Parliament Building (based on old New Zealand Parliament Buildings)

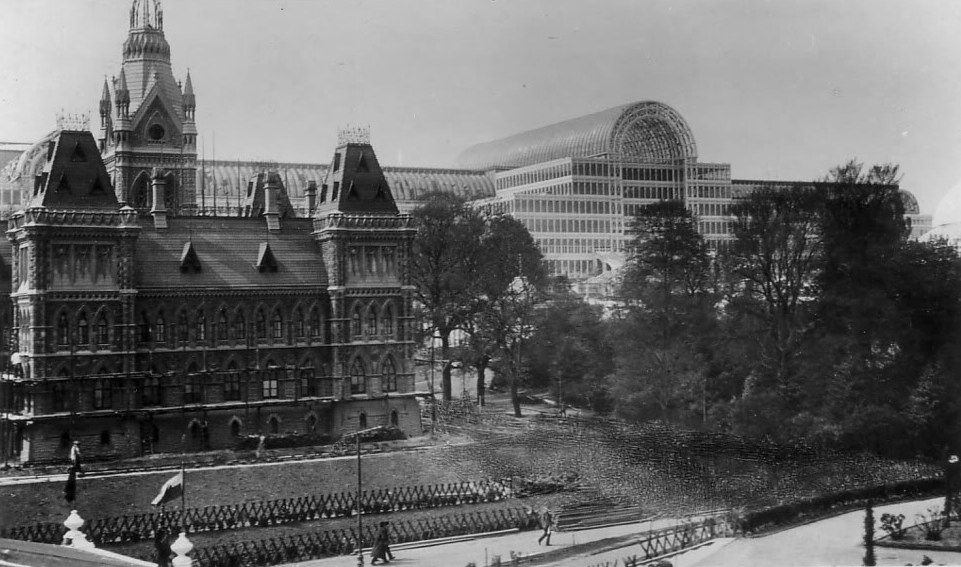
Canadian Building (replica of the original Centre Block in Ottawa)

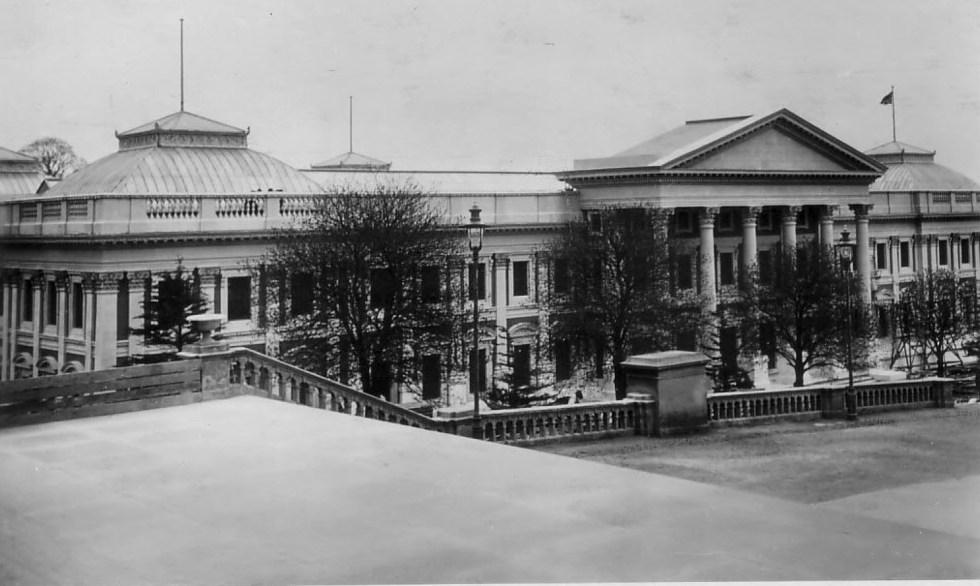
South African Building (based on Houses of Parliament, Cape Town)

At the 1911 Festival of Empire, exhibitions of products from the countries of the Empire were displayed in three-quarter size models of their Parliamentary buildings erected in the grounds, which were:

- Australia – based on Parliament House, Melbourne c. 1855
- Canada – based on Centre Block with Victoria Tower, 1866
- Newfoundland – based on Colonial Building, c. 1850
- New Zealand – based on New Zealand Parliament Buildings, pre-1907
- South Africa – based on Houses of Parliament, Cape Town c.1884

The buildings were constructed of timber and plaster as they were meant to be temporary. They were linked by an electric tramway called the 'All-Red Route' on which open-sided cars took the visitor on a circular tour of the dominions with typical scenery of each country around the buildings listed above. There were also many other exhibits within the Palace itself.

In all, there were 300 ornate buildings constructed by 7,000 workers, one and half miles of track line laid, a mix of stuffed wild animals and real ones (1,000 real wild Australian rabbits and many Newfoundland fish). Leolyn G Hart, theatre designer, oversaw the whole construction, engaging over 100 painters. The panorama building was adapted into an Indian pavilion, which included displays about Indian history and daily life and an exhibition of new Bengal art works curated by the India Society. It also included an Irish cottage village and an attraction named 'Empire Caves'.

=== Exhibits on the All-Red Route train ride ===
The buildings of the 1911 Festival of Empire were linked by an electric tramway called the 'All-Red Route' on which open-sided cars took visitors on a circular tour of the 'dominions' with typical scenery of each country. There were displays of so-called "natives at work", including African tribesmen, Malay people constructing houses and Maori villagers. These were people invited to London to act out scenes from their life and work in mocked up environments. Most Festival visitors would know little or nothing of such people and would not have seen such demonstrations. Some scenes included mannequins to represent some of the people of those colonies, seen by critics today as reinforcing notions of primitivism.

The route is shown in red on the map; the colour red and pink were used to denote the British Empire and its dominions on maps at that time. Bridges over small lakes represented sea voyages between the countries. Some of the cars may be seen in pictures included on this page. Scenes along the route included a South African Diamond Mine and an Indian Tea Plantation, photos of which are included below. There was also "a Jamaican sugar plantation, an Australian sheep farm" and "a jungle 'well stocked with wild beasts'".

== Pageant of London ==
A pageant, organised by 'Master of the Pageants' Frank Lascelles, dramatising the history of London, England and the Empire was held. The first performance of the pageant was on 8 June 1911; in four parts, performed on separate days, it celebrated the 'magnificence, glory and honour of the Empire and the Mother Country'. Music was provided for The Pageant of London by 20 composers including Ralph Vaughan Williams, Gustav Holst, Frank Bridge, Cecil Forsyth, Henry Balfour Gardiner, Edward German and Haydn Wood. This was performed by a military band of 50 players and a chorus of 500 voices, directed by W.H. Bell.

The best architects and designers of the day were also engaged in the orchestration of the Pageant, such as Edward Poynter and Aston Webb. The Pageant was so successful that performances were extended from July, when they were due to end, to 2 September, and a number of days were lost or spoilt due to bad weather.

== The King's Day with the Children ==
"The King's Day with the Children" was arranged as part of the Festival for 100,000 children to come to enjoy the Palace and Festival events on one day and meet the King and other members of the royal family. It was also considered a great organisational challenge. The children were chosen by ballot from London schools of all backgrounds.

== Inter-Empire Championships ==
As part of the festival, an Inter-Empire sports championship was held in which teams from Australasia (a combined team from Australia and New Zealand), Canada, South Africa, and the United Kingdom competed in five athletics events (100 yards, 220 yards, 880 yards, 1 mile and 120 yards hurdles), two swimming events (100 yards and 1 mile), heavyweight boxing and middleweight wrestling. This is regarded as a forerunner of the British Empire Games (now Commonwealth Games), held from 1930. Famous competitors included Stanley Vivian Bacon (from Great Britain), Harold Hardwick (from Australia), Malcolm Champion (from New Zealand), George Hodgson and John Lindsay Tait (both from Canada).

The limited event schedule and four-nation format came in for criticism by the correspondent in the Auckland Star, who described it as not worthy of the title of Empire.

| Event | Gold | | Silver | | Bronze | |
|---|---|---|---|---|---|---|
| Heavyweight boxing | Harold Hardwick (AUS) | Undefeated | William Hazell (GBR) | (lost to Hardwick in 2 1/2 minutes) | Julius Thompson (CAN) | (lost to Hardwick in first round after 2 minutes, 35 seconds) |
| 100-yard swim | Harold Hardwick (AUS) | 60.6 | John Derbyshire (GBR) | | Johnson (CAN) | |
| One-mile swim | George Hodgson (CAN) | 25:27.6 | Sydney Battersby (GBR) | (30 yards behind) | Malcolm Champion (NZL) | (retired due to fatigue) |
| Middleweight Wrestling | Stanley Vivian Bacon (GBR) | Undefeated | George Walker (CAN) | (defeated Smythe, lost to Bacon) | William Smythe (AUS) | (retired after first round defeat to Bacon) |

=== Athletics ===
Results source.

The team championship in athletics was decided on a points basis, with the countries' finishing position in each race totalling up a combined score. Canada won with the lowest score with eight points, having topped the podium in three of the five events, and was awarded the Inter-Empire trophy by Lord Lonsdale. The United Kingdom ended with nine points and Australasia were third with 13 points. The Australasia team combined New Zealand and Victoria athletes. Three scratch competitions were held alongside the championships proper: a 3/4-mile race, a 300-yard race and a two-mile team race.

Ron Opie ran in both sprints as his teammate, William A. Woodger, took ill before the event and could not compete.

| Event | Gold | | Silver | | Bronze | |
|---|---|---|---|---|---|---|
| 100-yard dash | Frank Halbhaus (CAN) | 10.4 | Duncan Macmillan (GBR) | (one foot behind winner) | Ron Opie (NZL) | (one yard behind runner-up) |
| 220-yard dash | Frank Halbhaus (CAN) | 23.0 | Ron Opie (NZL) | (inches behind winner) | Ernest Haley (GBR) | |
| 880-yard dash | Jim Hill (GBR) | 1:58.6 | Dad Wheatley (VIC) | (two yards behind winner) | Mel Brock (CAN) | (two yards behind winner) |
| Mile run | John Tait (CAN) | 4:46.2 | Eddie Owen (GBR) | (one yard behind winner) | Guy Haskins (NZL) | (six yards behind winner) |
| 120-yard hurdles | Kenneth Powell (GBR) | 16.0 | Frank Lukeman (CAN) | (half a yard behind winner) | Frank Brown (VIC) | (six yards behind runner-up) |
| 1320 yards (scratch) | Richard Yorke; London Athletic Club | 3:21.2 minutes | Arnold Knox; Canada | (eight yards behind winner) | Albert Hare; Herne Hill Harriers | |
| 300 yards (scratch) | Algernon Wells; Herne Hill Harriers | 23.4 | W. T. Wettenhall; Cambridge Athletic Club | (two yards behind winner) | F. J. Hoskin; Herne Hill Harriers | (one yard behind runner-up) |
| Two-mile team race (scratch) | Herne Hill Harriers | 7 pts | South London Harriers | 19 pts | Essex Beagles | 20 pts |

== The End of the Festival ==
By the time it closed in October 1911, four to five million people had visited the Festival of Empire, including one million to see the Pageant. However, it clocked up a massive loss of £250,000 – a debt borne by the Festival's private backers not the Crystal Palace Company. Meanwhile, that Company had been in receivership and a date for the auction of the site had been set for 28 November. The Festival might well have been the last dramatic event at the site, before the land was parcelled up and sold off for housing. Fortunately, Lord Plymouth arranged a share offer, including £240,000 from him, to save the site.

== Reception ==
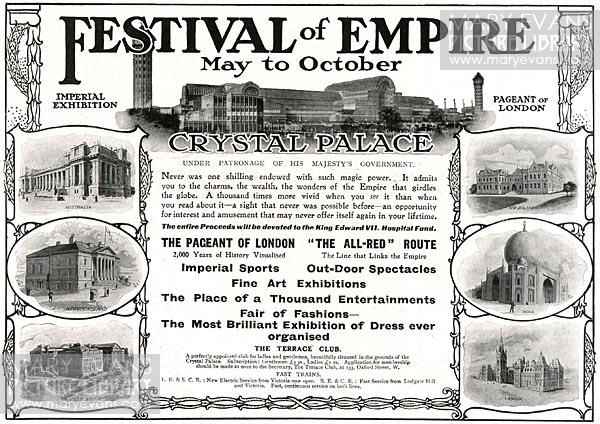
An advertising promotion for the Festival of Empire at the Crystal Palace, running from May to October 1911. The Festival features the Imperial exhibition, the Pageant of London, and many more spectacles, displays and entertainments.

The event was greatly praised by the newspapers of the day, impressed by its sheer scale and ambition. The Globe newspaper reported in May, 1911, "Nothing like this Festival has been attempted by any nation". The Pall Mall Gazette opined that the grounds were transformed, "Aladin-like into a glittering group of white pavilions, like a cluster of snowy peaks recast in molds of beauty and geographical significance". The Daily Telegraph reported, "never before... has the home-keeping Londoner been afforded the opportunity of realising... the varied aspect of different parts of the Empire".

Present day critics question the 1911 Festival of Empire, and other such colonial events, regarding their depiction of the colonies and colonised people. This has been critically examined in relation to the 1851 Great Exhibition and the way in which it 'othered' colonised ethnic groups to strengthen British national identity.

Although the 1911 Festival of Empire claimed to be an opportunity to admire and seek amusement in "the charms, the wealth and the wonders of the Empire that girdles the globe" – as written in the official flyer – in recent years questions around the mode of ethics in which it showcased the "dominions" have been questioned. It was an event promoting "Firmer welding of invisible bonds which hold together the greatest empire in the world", yet other accounts recognise that there were underlying tensions and antipathies and that the festival did little to bridge the gap between the classes.

The 1911 Festival of Empire, and other such events at the Crystal Palace, served to both integrate and segregate as it reflected and reinforced hierarchies not only within British society, but also served as a facilitator to the upholding of primitivism and the inaccurate representation of people from the "Orient", the continent of Africa and Oceania.

The use of exhibitions where "human models were arranged into visual narratives that Latham deemed representative of their ethnic traits", promoted and reinforced ideas of what it looked like to be from Africa or India, and these people were commonly described as primitives and cannibals being "saved" by the act of colonisation. As written in 'Exhibiting the Empire: Cultures of Display', the visitors "were encouraged to compare themselves with the peoples on display and note their progress from the relatively lowly states of the human race".
