= Bill Bachrach =

American swimming and water polo coach

Biographical details
- Born: May 15, 1879; Elgin, Illinois, U.S.
- Died: July 16, 1959 (aged 80); Chicago, Illinois, U.S.

Coaching career (HC unless noted)
- 1912-1954: Illinois Athletic Club
- 1924, 1928: Olympic Swim. Coach

Accomplishments and honors

Championships
- 4 U.S. national championships ('14-'17, Water Polo); 120 National AAU Championships

Awards
- '94 Jewish Sports Hall of Fame '96 International Swim. Hall of Fame; 2002 ASCA Hall of Fame

William Bachrach (May 15, 1879 in Chicago, Illinois – July 1959) was an American swimming and water polo coach.

== Early life ==
Bachrach was Jewish, and one of 16 children born to Charles and Leonora Bachrach in Elgin, Illinois, 40 miles west of Chicago. In the 1890s, he was a competitive swimmer. He served in the Spanish–American War.

== Coaching career ==
Imposing and somewhat demanding as a coach, the 6 foot tall Bachrach weighed 300 pounds in later life, though his students enjoyed and welcomed his guidance, referring to him as “the beloved tyrant.” He began as a swimming instructor at the Chicago Central YMCA.

He later moved to the Illinois Athletic Club (IAC). There, Bachrach coached swimming and water polo from 1912–54. His 1914–17 IAC water polo teams won the U.S. national championship for four straight years. Impressively, his 1914 team won every Men's National AAU Championship event. At the IAC, he coached Jam Handy, Harry Hebner, Mike McDermott, Perry McGillivray, Norman Ross, Bob Skelton, Johnny Weissmuller (later famous in Hollywood as "Tarzan"), Arne Borg, Sybil Bauer, Ethel Lackie, and others. His swimmers won 120 National AAU Championships.

=== '24, '28 Olympics and Olympians ===
Bachrach was also head coach of the 1924 Olympics and 1928 Olympics U.S. men's and women's swim teams. His swimmers won 13 gold medals in Paris in 1924, and 10 gold medals in Amsterdam in 1928. He developed four swimmers who won gold medals at the 1924 Olympics: Weissmuller (100m and 400m freestyles, and 800m relay), Skelton (200m breaststroke), Lackie (100m freestyle and 400m relay), and Sybil Bauer (100m backstroke). Weissmuller also won two gold medals at the 1928 Olympics (100m freestyle and 800m relay. He also developed Norman Ross, who won gold medals in the 400m and 1,500m freestyles and 800m relay at the 1920 Olympics in Antwerp. Legend has it that Bachrach was the first to tryout Weissmuller at the Illinois Athletic Club, where Weissmuller broke a world record, and shortly after set a record for the 100 yard freestyle of 49.8 seconds, one of Weissmuller's best known athletic feats.

== Honors ==
In 1994, Bachrach was inducted into the International Jewish Sports Hall of Fame. He was inducted into the International Swimming Hall of Fame in 1996, and in 2002 he was inducted into the American Swimming Coach's Hall of Fame.

He died July 16, 1959 at Veteran's Research Hospital in Chicago.

== See also ==
- List of members of the International Swimming Hall of Fame
