= Stuart Poulter =

Australian long-distance runner

Personal information
- Nationality: Australian
- Born: 20 January 1889 Sydney, Australia
- Died: 30 September 1956 (aged 67) Rockdale, New South Wales, Australia

Sport
- Sport: Long-distance running
- Event: Marathon

Stuart Poulter (20 January 1889 – 30 September 1956) was an Australian long-distance runner. He competed in the marathon at the 1912 Summer Olympics.
