= Swimming at the 1912 Summer Olympics – Men's 4 × 200 metre freestyle relay =

Men's 4 × 200 metre freestyle relay at the Games of the V Olympiad
- Venue: Djurgårdsbrunnsviken
- Dates: 12 July 1912 (semifinals); 15 July 1912 (final)
- Competitors: 20 from 5 nations
- Teams: 5
- Winning time: 10:11.2 WR

Medalists
1st place, gold medalist(s)		Cecil Healy, Malcolm Champion, Leslie Boardman, Harold Hardwick; Australasia
2nd place, silver medalist(s)		Ken Huszagh, Perry McGillivray, Harry Hebner, Duke Kahanamoku, United States
3rd place, bronze medalist(s)		William Foster, Thomas Battersby, Jack Hatfield, Henry Taylor; Great Britain

The men's 4 × 200 metre freestyle relay was a swimming event held as part of the swimming at the 1912 Summer Olympics programme. It was the second appearance of the event, which had been introduced in 1908. The competition was held on Friday July 12, 1912 and Monday July 15, 1912. Twenty swimmers from five nations competed.

== Records ==
These were the standing world and Olympic records (in minutes) prior to the 1912 Summer Olympics.

World record	10:53.4	(United Kingdom) William Foster (United Kingdom) Paul Radmilovic (United Kingdom) John Derbyshire (United Kingdom) Henry Taylor	London (GBR)	July 24, 1908
Olympic record	10:53.4	(United Kingdom) William Foster (United Kingdom) Paul Radmilovic (United Kingdom) John Derbyshire (United Kingdom) Henry Taylor	London (GBR)	July 24, 1908

All five teams swam in times under the standing world record in the semifinals. The Americans, by virtue of winning the first semifinal, held the new record only until the Australasian team won the second in a better time. The Australasians bettered their own record in the final, making the 4x200 free relay an event in which the Olympic record (and world record) was broken each heat.

== Results ==
=== Semifinals ===
The top two from each heat and the fastest of third place teams advanced. Since there were only five teams that started, this resulted in all five advancing to the finals with no team eliminated by the semifinals.

Semifinal 1

Place	Swimmers	Time	Qual.
1	Ken Huszagh, Duke Kahanamoku, Perry McGillivray, Harry Hebner (USA)	10:26.4	QF WR
2	László Beleznai, Imre Zachár, Alajos Kenyery, Béla Las-Torres (HUN)	10:34.6	QF
3	William Foster, Thomas Battersby, Jack Hatfield, Henry Taylor (GBR)	10:39.4	qf

Semifinal 2

Place	Swimmers	Time	Qual.
1	Harold Hardwick, Malcolm Champion, Leslie Boardman, Cecil Healy (ANZ)	10:14.0	QF WR
2	Oscar Schiele, Georg Kunisch, Kurt Bretting, Max Ritter (GER)	10:42.2	QF

=== Final ===
Place	Swimmers	Time
1	Cecil Healy, Malcolm Champion, Leslie Boardman, Harold Hardwick (ANZ)	10:11.2 WR
2	Ken Huszagh, Perry McGillivray, Harry Hebner, Duke Kahanamoku (USA)	10:20.2
3	William Foster, Thomas Battersby, Jack Hatfield, Henry Taylor (GBR)	10:28.6
4	Oscar Schiele, Georg Kunisch, Kurt Bretting, Max Ritter (GER)	10:37.0
5	? (HUN)	DNS
