= George Hill (runner) =

New Zealand long-distance runner

George Neville Hill (26 February 1891 – 29 November 1944) was a New Zealand track and field athlete who competed as a member of the Australasian team in the 1912 Summer Olympics at Stockholm. Hill finished fourth in his heat of the 5000 metres and did not advance to the final. He did not finish in his heat of the 10000 metres.
