= Walther Binner =

German swimmer

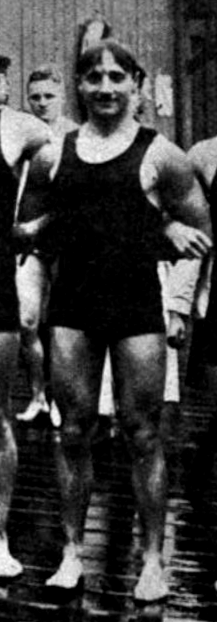
- In Hamburg, c. 1912

Personal information
- Nationality: German
- Born: 28 January 1891 Breslau, German Empire
- Died: 18 September 1971 (aged 80) Frankfurt am Main, West Germany

Sport
- Sport: Swimming
- Strokes: freestyle

Walther Binner (28 January 1891 – 18 September 1971) was a German freestyle swimmer who competed in the 1912 Summer Olympics. He was born in Breslau and died in Frankfurt am Main.

At the 1912 Olymptic Games, he was eliminated in the first round of the 100 metre freestyle event. He later served as the president of FINA, swimming's international govering body. from 1932 to 1936, and was a member of theInternational Olympic Committee.
