= Harold Hardwick =

Australian sportsman (1888–1959)

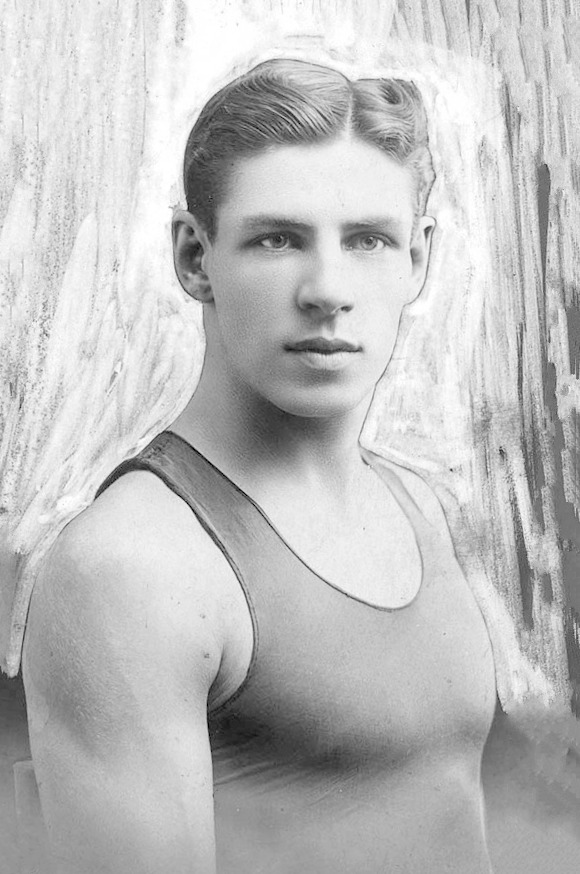

Personal information
- Full name: Harold Hampton Hardwick
- National team: Australia
- Born: 14 December 1888 Balmain, New South Wales, Australia
- Died: 22 February 1959 (aged 70) Rushcutters Bay, New South Wales, Australia

Sport
- Sport: Swimming
- Strokes: Freestyle
- Club: Enterprise Swimming Club
Medal record
Men's swimming
Representing Australasia
Olympic Games
Gold medal – first place	1912 Stockholm	4 × 200 m freestyle
Bronze medal – third place	1912 Stockholm	400 m freestyle
Bronze medal – third place	1912 Stockholm	1500 m freestyle

Harold Hampton Hardwick (14 December 1888 – 22 February 1959) was a versatile Australian sports star of the early 20th century – an Olympic gold medal swimmer, national heavyweight boxing champion, and a state representative rugby union player. He later became a colonel in the Australian Imperial Force. Hardwick was on the winning team of the 4 × 200 m freestyle relay at the 1912 Summer Olympics and won bronze medals in the 400 and 1500 m freestyle events.

== Early life ==
Born in Balmain, Sydney, to George Henry Hardwick and his wife Priscilla, Harold began swimming at an early age and, at 11, was winning races. At the age of 16, while attending Fort Street High School, he became the Public Schools' swimming champion of Sydney. He played rugby in the school's first XV and captained its lifesaving team.

== Swimming career ==
In 1907, embracing the newly popular Australian crawl stroke, Hardwick won the New South Wales 100-yard championships in 61.6 seconds. In 1909, he came second at the Australasian Championships in the 100-yard and 880-yard events, behind Cecil Healy and Frank Beaurepaire respectively. In 1911, Hardwick won the 220-yard, 440-yard, and 880-yard freestyle at the Australasian Championships. At the 1911 Festival of Empire Games in London, a precursor of the Commonwealth Games to commemorate the coronation of George V, Hardwick won both the 110yd freestyle and heavyweight boxing title. He remained in England for the English Swimming Championships, winning the 100-yard, 220-yard and 440-yard freestyle titles. In 1912, he was selected to represent the Australasia combined team of Australians and New Zealanders at the 1912 Summer Olympics, but could not compete in boxing, as it was omitted for the only time in Olympic history.

Hardwick was eliminated in the 100-metre freestyle semifinals. In the 400-metre freestyle, he won his heat and semifinal and held the lead in the final for a period before being defeated by Canada's George Hodgson and the United Kingdom's Jack Hatfield, earning a bronze medal. In the 1500-metre, Hardwick won his heat and semifinal and again contested the lead in the final before being worn down by Hodgson and Hatfield. He then combined with Healy, Leslie Boardman, and Malcolm Champion to win the 4 × 200 m freestyle relay, splitting 2:31.2 for the fastest leg of the quartet.

== Rugby & boxing ==
After returning to Australia, Hardwick stopped swimming at the international level and diversified his interests, joining the Manly Surf Club, in which he participated in winning State Championships. He played first grade rugby union for Sydney's Eastern Suburbs RUFC, winning a premiership with the club in 1913. In 1910, he had been selected for New South Wales to represent against a visiting American universities team.

In 1914, he won the New South Wales' State amateur heavyweight boxing championship, and in 1915, he turned professional in boxing, signing to appear for the promoter Snowy Baker. That year, he promptly claimed the national championship. In his final professional bout in 1916, he was knocked out by Les Darcy. Earlier in that bout, Hardwick broke both of Darcy's front teeth, and the hurried dental correction done after the fight (re-pinning the teeth on gold posts) ultimately resulted in complications and an infection that caused Darcy's death in 1917.

== Military service and later life ==
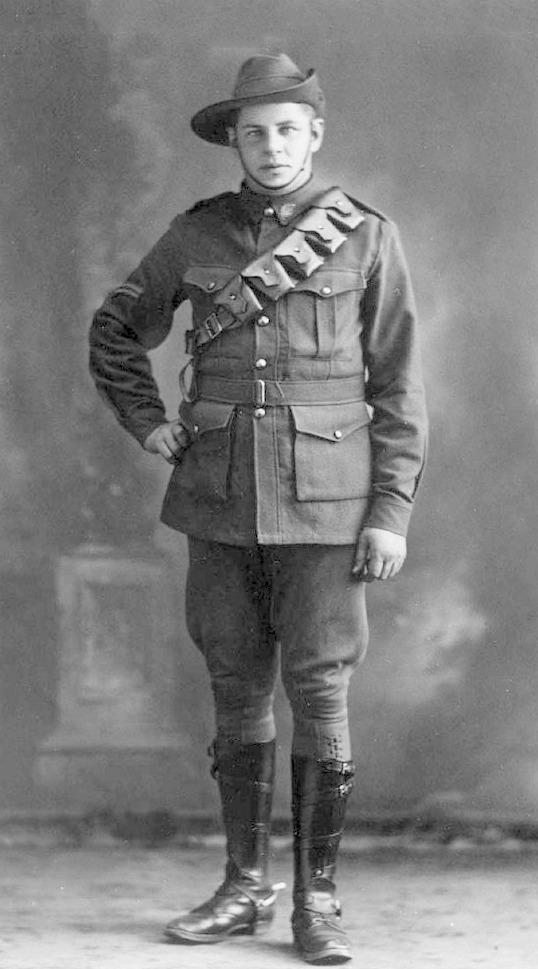
Corporal Harold Hardwick, ca. Aug 1919

He joined the Australian Imperial Force in August 1917 and served in World War I with the No.2 Signal Squadron as a sapper in the Middle East. He was discharged in October 1918 at the war's end. He maintained a commission in the militia from 1921, and during World War II as lieutenant-colonel, he commanded the 1st Cavalry Divisional Signals from 1940 to 1942, rising to the rank of colonel.

After the war, he worked for the New South Wales Education Department, helping to establish the structure of physical education and swimming programs in schools. He died of a coronary occlusion on 22 February 1959.

== See also ==
- List of Olympic medalists in swimming (men)
- World record progression 4 × 200 metres freestyle relay

Awards and achievements
Preceded by Dave Smith	Australian heavyweight Championship	Succeeded by Les Darcy
