= William Longworth =

Australian swimmer

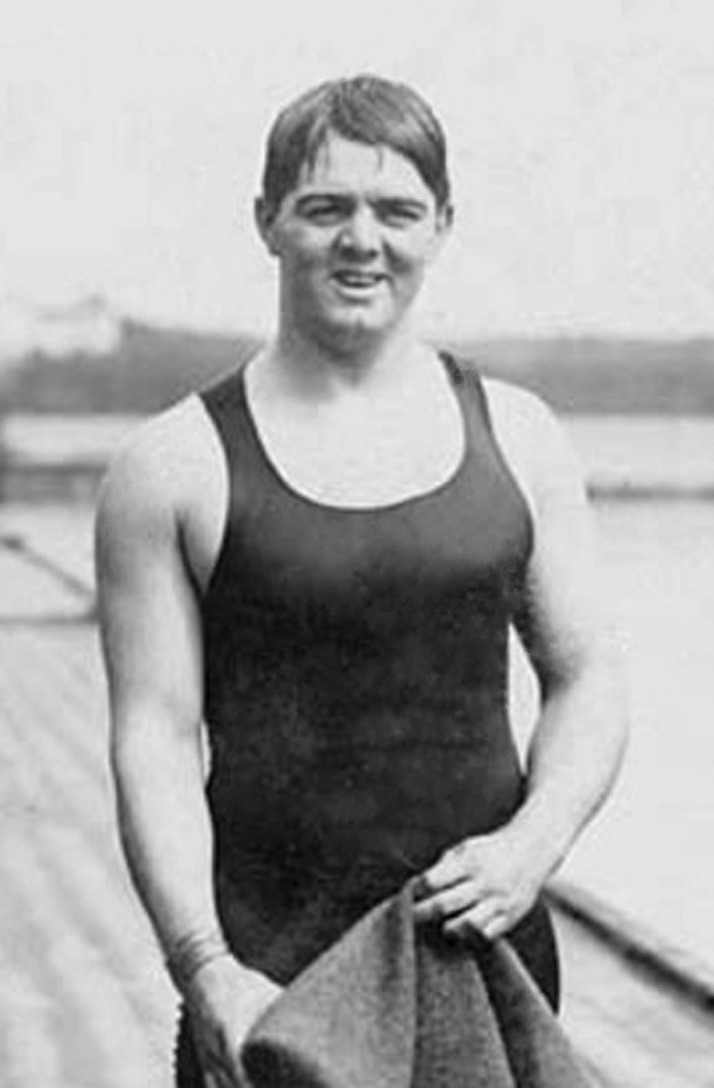
- Longworth at 1912 Olympics

Personal information
- Full name: William Longworth
- National team: Australia
- Born: 26 September 1892 Singleton, New South Wales
- Died: 19 October 1969 (aged 77) Wahroonga, New South Wales

Sport
- Sport: Swimming
- Strokes: Freestyle

William Longworth (26 September 1892 – 19 October 1969) was an Australian freestyle swimmer who competed for Australasia in the 1912 Summer Olympics.

== Personal ==
He was born in Rix's Creek, Singleton, New South Wales, and died in Wahroonga, New South Wales.

== Swimming ==
Longworth attended Sydney Grammar School, where he excelled in athletics, swimming, and rugby. In January 1911, he won the 1320-yard freestyle in world record time at the Australian Championship by 30 yards. He defeated Cecil Healy and Frank Beaurepaire. In 1912, he won all the New South Wales and Australian freestyle championships from 100 yards to one mile. In 1912, he qualified for the final of the 100-metre freestyle, as well as for the semifinals of the 1500-metre freestyle, but due to illness he was unable to continue competing.

== Military ==
Longworth enlisted in the First Australian Imperial Force on 13 September 1915. He served in France from November as a sergeant with the Anzac Entrenchment Battalion. He represented the A.I.F. in swimming.
