= Perry McGillivray =

American swimmer (1893–1944)

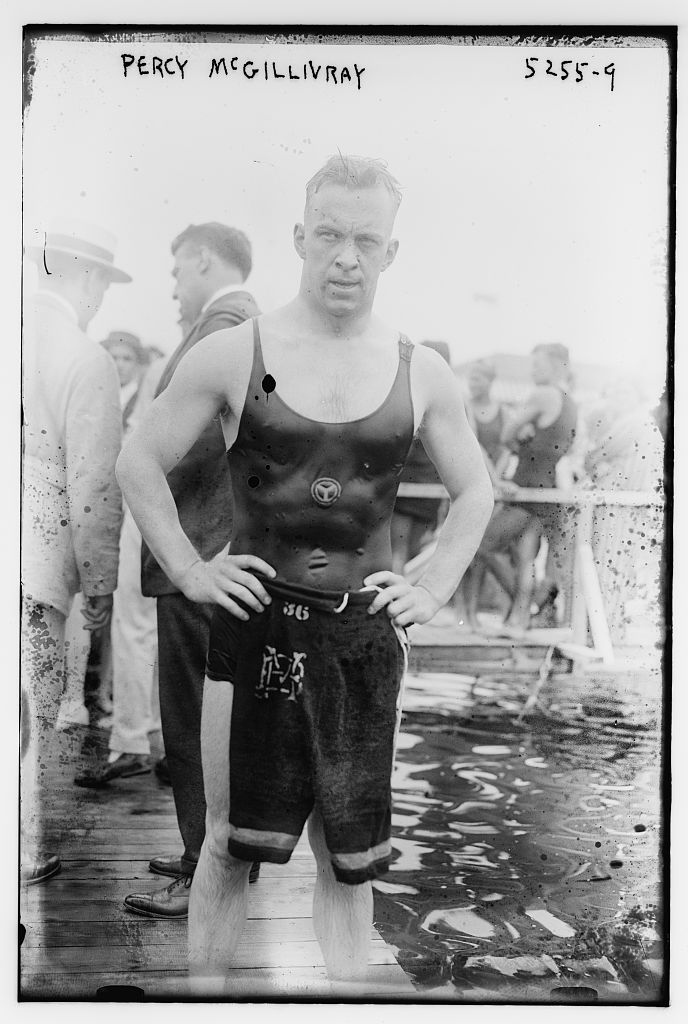
- McGillivray in 1920

Personal information
- Full name: Perry McGillivray
- National team: United States
- Born: August 5, 1893 Chicago, Illinois, U.S.
- Died: July 27, 1944 (aged 50) Maywood, Illinois, U.S.
- Height: 5 ft 7 in (1.70 m)
- Spouse: Margaret Holland (m. 1921)

Sport
- Sport: Swimming
- Strokes: Backstroke, freestyle, water polo
- Club: Illinois Athletic Club (IAC)
- College team: University of Illinois
- Coach: William Bachrach (IAC); Otto Wahle (Olympics)
Medal record
Men's swimming
Representing the United States
Olympic Games
| Gold medal – first place | 1920 Antwerp | 4×200 m freestyle |
| Silver medal – second place | 1912 Stockholm | 4×200 m freestyle |

Perry McGillivray (August 5, 1893 – July 27, 1944) was an American competition swimmer and water polo player who represented the United States at the 1912 Summer Olympics and 1920 Summer Olympics.

McGillivray was born August 5, 1893, in Chicago, to father Edward Wallace McGillivray, and Lucy Mann McGillivray. Perry was a graduate of Oak Park High School, which had a long tradition of excelling in both academics and athletics. He later attended, and competed for the University of Illinois. McGillivray had three brothers that included Wallace, who coached swimming at the University of Chicago, Howard and Lowell.

== 1912 Stockholm Olympics ==
In the 1912 Olympics in Stockholm, Sweden he competed in the 100-meter freestyle and reached the semifinal. He also was a member of the United States' 4 × 200 m freestyle relay team which won a silver medal. The US swimming team at the 1912 Olympics was coached by Austrian- born American Otto Wahle, a former two-time Olympic medalist. The US did not compete in water polo at the 1912 Olympics.

In 1913, McGillivray held the US freestyle titles in the 50, 220, and 500 yard events. He set short lived US records in the 440 and 500 yard freestyle distance events.

== 1920 Antwerp Olympics ==
In the 1920 Olympics, in Antwerp, Belgium, McGillivray placed fourth in the 100-metre backstroke. With the US team a clear pre-Game favorite, McGillivray won a gold medal as a member of the United States' 4 × 200 m freestyle relay team. McGillivay swam the lead-off leg, helping the team to a world record time of 10:04.4, a full twenty seconds ahead of second place Australia who took the silver. The team from Great Britain took the bronze. McGillivrary also played three matches for the United States water polo team, which finished fourth under the coaching of former Olympic medalist Otto Wahle.

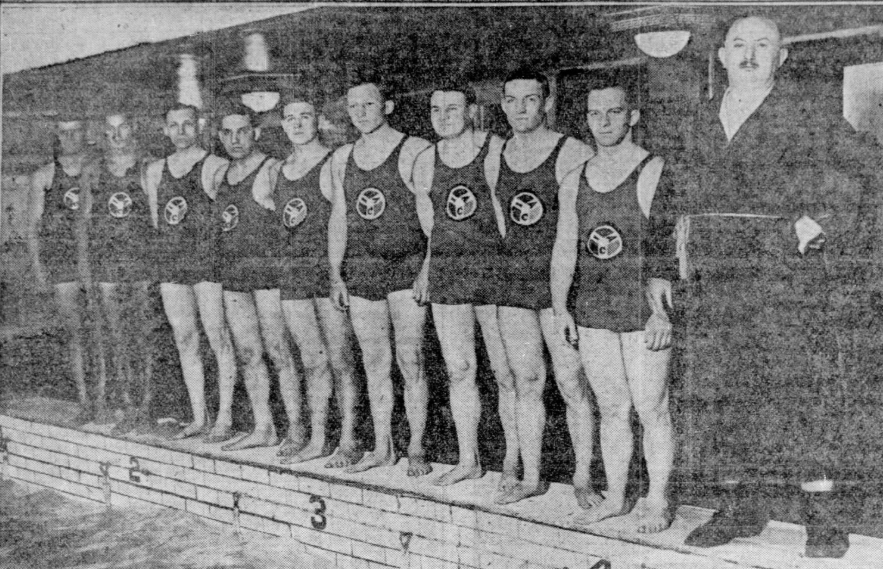
1924 IAC Water Polo Team, McGillivray far right

McGillivray and his IAC team members helped revolutionize and modernize the game of water polo in a number of ways. McGillivray is credited with inventing the slow lob into the goal, which insured accuracy. He helped advance and develop a faster aerial passing game that increased the speed of play and set-up fast breaks and scoring assists.

McGillivray's participation with the Illinois Athletic Club coached by William Bachrach led to exceptional achievement. In the photo at left, McGillivrary is shown at far right in IAC jersey with the 1924 IAC Water Polo Team next to the taller, heavier Coach William Bachrach wearing a dark bathrobe. McGillivray served as a forward, and the Water Polo team captain that year. From 1908 to 1927, he captured national American Athletic Union titles thirty-six times. The IAC team won the AAU water polo championship seven times.

=== Marriage ===
He married Margaret Holland in mid-October, 1921. The marriage lasted the remainder of his life.

=== Coaching ===
In addition to competing in water polo in the 1920 Olympics, McGillivrary coached the 1928 Men's Olympic water polo team in Amsterdam to a seventh-place finish overall. He is one of only four Americans to both play on the US Olympic water polo team and coach it, along with Austin Clapp, Terry Schroeder, and the more recent John Vargas.

=== Honors ===
In 1976, he was inducted into the USA Water Polo Hall of Fame, and is also a member of the International Swimming Hall of Fame.

He died July 27, 1944, at age 50 at Billings Hospital in Maywood, Illinois, with funeral services held at 2:00 PM on July 31 at the Funeral Home on Suburban Maywood's Lake Street and 2nd Avenue. He was buried at Oakridge Abbey, part of the Oakridge-Glen Oak Cemetery in Hillside, Illinois, and was survived by his wife, the former Margaret Holland.

== See also ==
- List of members of the International Swimming Hall of Fame
- List of Olympic medalists in swimming (men)
- World record progression 4 × 200 metres freestyle relay
