= Duke Kahanamoku =

Hawaiian surfer (1890–1968)

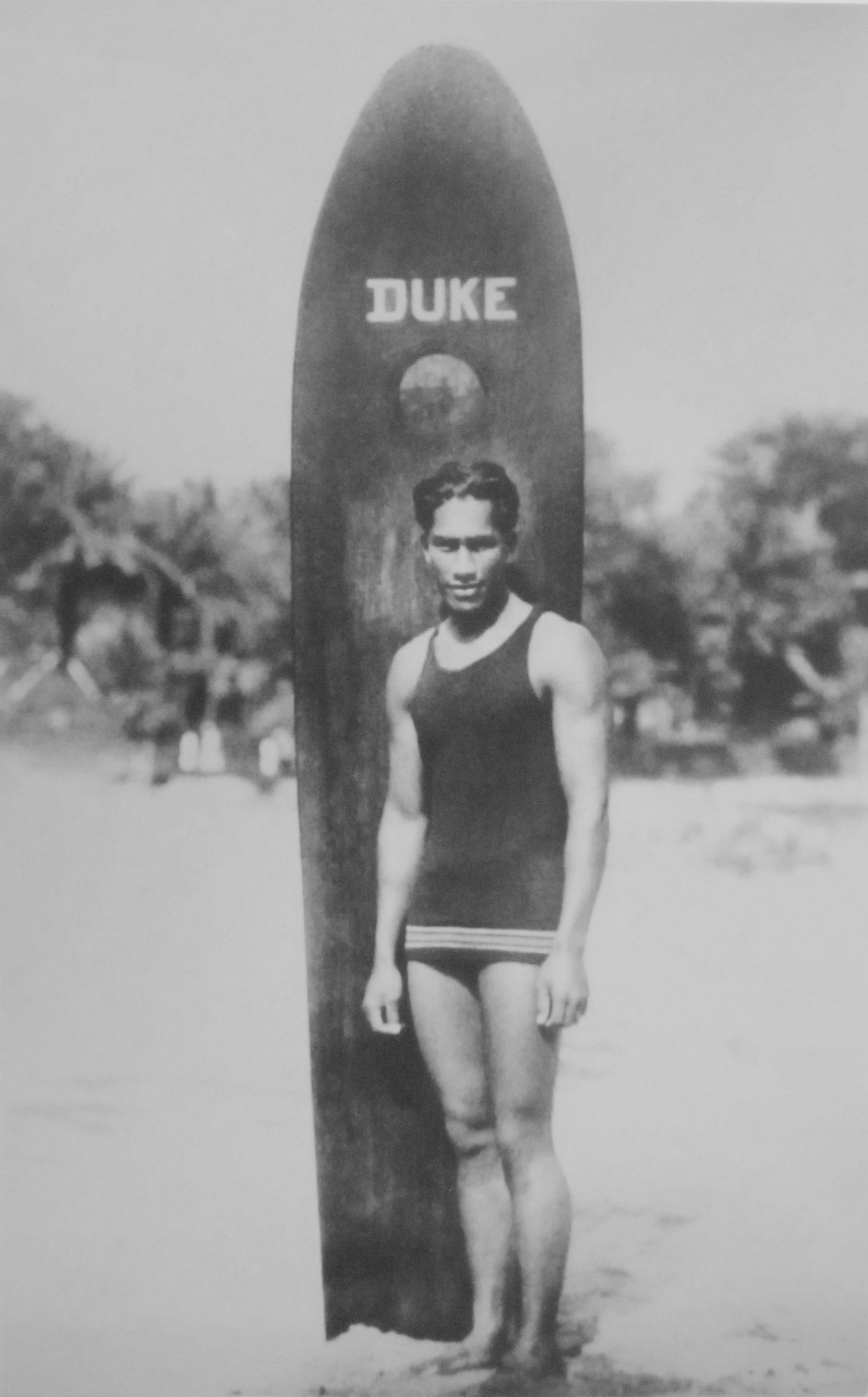
- Kahanamoku c. 1912

Personal information
- Full name: Duke Paoa Kahinu Mokoe Hulikohola Kahanamoku
- Born: August 24, 1890 Haleʻākala, Honolulu, Kingdom of Hawaii
- Died: January 22, 1968 (aged 77) Honolulu, Hawaii, U.S.
- Height: 6 ft 1 in (185 cm)
- Weight: 190 lb (86 kg)

Surfing career
- Sport: Surfing
Medal record
Representing the United States
Olympic Games
Gold medal – first place	1912 Stockholm	100 m freestyle
Gold medal – first place	1920 Antwerp	100 m freestyle
Gold medal – first place	1920 Antwerp	4×200 m freestyle
Silver medal – second place	1912 Stockholm	4×200 m freestyle
Silver medal – second place	1924 Paris	100 m freestyle

Signature

Duke Paoa Kahinu Mokoe Hulikohola Kahanamoku (August 24, 1890 – January 22, 1968) was a Hawaiian competition swimmer, lifeguard, and popularizer of the sport of surfing. A Native Hawaiian, he was born three years before the overthrow of the Hawaiian Kingdom. He lived to see the territory's admission as a state and became a United States citizen. He was the world record holder of the 100-meters free style in swimming, and was a five-time Olympic medalist in swimming, winning medals in 1912, 1920 and 1924.

Kahanamoku joined fraternal organizations: he was a Scottish Rite Freemason in the Honolulu lodge, and a Shriner. He worked as a law enforcement officer, an actor, a beach volleyball player, and a businessman.

== Family background ==
According to Kahanamoku, he was born in Honolulu at Haleʻākala, the home of Bernice Pauahi Bishop, which was later converted into the Arlington Hotel.

He was born into a family of Native Hawaiians headed by Duke Halapu Kahanamoku and Julia Paʻakonia Lonokahikina Paoa. He had five brothers, and three sisters. His brothers were Sargent, Samuel, David, William and Louis, all of whom participated in competitive aquatic sports. His sisters were Bernice, Kapiolani and Maria.

"Duke" was not a title or a nickname, but a given name. He was named after his father, Duke Halapu Kahanamoku, who was christened by Bernice Pauahi Bishop in honor of Prince Alfred, Duke of Edinburgh, who was visiting Hawaii at the time. His father was a policeman. His mother Julia Paʻakonia Lonokahikina Paoa was a deeply religious woman with a strong sense of family ancestry.

His parents were from prominent Hawaiian ohana (families). The Kahanamoku and the Paoa ohana were considered to be lower-ranking nobles, who were in service to the aliʻi nui, or royalty. His paternal grandfather was Kahanamoku and his grandmother, Kapiolani Kaoeha (sometimes spelled Kahoea), a descendant of Alapainui. They were kahu, retainers and trusted advisors of the Kamehamehas, to whom they were related. His maternal grandparents Paoa, son of Paoa Hoolae and Hiikaalani, and Mele Uliama, were also of aliʻi descent.

In 1893, his family moved to Kālia, Waikiki (near the present site of Hilton Hawaiian Village), to be closer to his mother's parents and family. Kahanamoku grew up with his siblings and 31 Paoa cousins. He attended the Waikiki Grammar School, Kaahumanu School, and the Kamehameha Schools, although he never graduated because he had to quit to help support the family.

== Early years ==
Growing up on the outskirts of Waikiki, Kahanamoku spent much of his youth at the beach, where he developed his surfing and swimming skills. In his youth, Kahanamoku preferred a traditional surf board, which he called his "papa nui", constructed after the fashion of ancient Hawaiian olo boards. Made from the wood of a koa tree, it was 16 feet (4.9 m) long and weighed 114 pounds (52 kg). The board was without a skeg, which had yet to be invented. In his later surfing career, he would often use smaller boards but always preferred those made of wood.

Kahanamoku was a powerful swimmer. On August 11, 1911, he was timed at 55.4 seconds in the 100 yards (91 m) freestyle, beating the existing world record by 4.6 seconds, in the salt water of Honolulu Harbor. He broke the record in the 220 yd (200 m) and equaled it in the 50 yd (46 m). But the Amateur Athletic Union (AAU), in disbelief, would not recognize these feats until many years later. The AAU initially claimed that the judges must have been using alarm clocks rather than stopwatches and later claimed that ocean currents aided Kahanamoku.

== Career ==
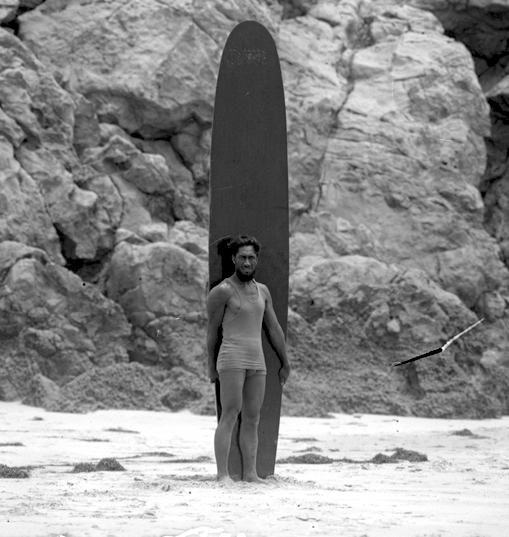
Duke Kahanamoku with his solid redwood surfboard, in Corona Del Mar, California in 1921

Kahanamoku easily qualified for the U.S. Olympic swimming team in 1912. At the 1912 Summer Olympics in Stockholm, he won a gold medal in the 100-meter freestyle, and a silver medal with the second-place U.S. team in the men's 4×200-meter freestyle relay.

During the 1920 Olympics in Antwerp, Kahanamoku won gold medals in both the 100 meters (bettering fellow Hawaiian Pua Kealoha) and in the relay. He finished the 100 meters with a silver medal during the 1924 Olympics in Paris, with the gold going to Johnny Weissmuller and the bronze to Kahanamoku's brother, Samuel. By then age 34, Kahanamoku won no more Olympic medals. But he served as an alternate for the U.S. water polo team at the 1932 Summer Olympics.

=== Post-Olympic career ===
Between Olympic competitions, and after retiring from the Olympics, Kahanamoku traveled internationally to give swimming exhibitions. It was during this period that he popularized the sport of surfing, previously known only in Hawaii, by incorporating surfing exhibitions into his touring exhibitions as well. He attracted people to surfing in mainland America first in 1912 while in Southern California. He trained and loaned equipment to new surfers, such as Dorothy Becker.

His surfing exhibition at Sydney, Australia's Freshwater Beach on December 24, 1914, is widely regarded as a seminal event in the development of surfing in Australia. The board that Kahanamoku built from a piece of pine from a local hardware store is retained by the Freshwater Surf Life Saving Club. A statue of Kahanamoku was erected in his honor on the Northern headland of Freshwater Lake, New South Wales.

During his time living in Southern California, Kahanamoku performed in Hollywood as a background actor and a character actor in several films. He made connections in this way with people who could further publicize the sport of surfing. Kahanamoku was involved with the Los Angeles Athletic Club, acting as a lifeguard and competing in both swimming and water polo teams.

While living in Newport Beach, California, on June 14, 1925, Kahanamoku rescued eight men from a fishing vessel that capsized in heavy surf while it was attempting to enter the city's harbor. Using his surfboard, Kahanamoku made repeated trips from shore to the capsized ship, and helped rescue several people. Two other surfers saved four more fishermen, while five succumbed to the seas before they could be rescued. At the time the Newport Beach police chief called Kahanamoku's efforts "The most superhuman surfboard rescue act the world has ever seen." The widespread publicity surrounding the rescue influenced lifeguards across the US to begin the use of surfboards as standard equipment for water rescues.

Kahanamoku was the first person to be inducted into both the Swimming Hall of Fame and the International Surfing Museum's Walk of Fame. The Duke Kahanamoku Invitational Surfing Championships in Hawaii, the first major professional surfing contest event ever held in the huge surf on the North Shore of Oahu, was named in his honor, and first held in 1965. He is a member of the U.S. Olympic Hall of Fame.

Later Kahanamoku was elected to serve as the Sheriff of Honolulu, Hawaii from 1935 to 1961, completing 13 consecutive terms. During World War II, he served as a military police officer for the United States; Hawai'i was not yet a state and was administered.

In the postwar period, Kahanamoku appeared in a number of television programs and films, including Mister Roberts (1955). He was well-liked throughout the Hollywood community.

Kahanamoku became a friend and surfing companion of heiress Doris Duke. She built a home (now a museum) on Oahu named Shangri-la. Kahanamoku gave private surfing lessons to Franklin D. Roosevelt Jr. and John Aspinwall Roosevelt, the children of Franklin D. Roosevelt.

== Duncan v. Kahanamoku ==
In 1946, Kahanamoku was the pro forma defendant in the landmark Supreme Court case Duncan v. Kahanamoku. While Kahanamoku was a military police officer during World War II, he arrested Duncan, a civilian shipfitter, for public intoxication.

At the time, Hawaii, not yet a state, was being administered by the United States under the Hawaiian Organic Act. This effectively instituted martial law on the island. After Duncan was tried by a military tribunal, he appealed to the Supreme Court. In a post hoc ruling, the court ruled that trial by military tribunal for the civilian was, in this case, unconstitutional.

== Personal life ==
On August 2, 1940, Kahanamoku married dance instructor Nadine Alexander, who had relocated to Hawaii from Cleveland, Ohio, after she had been hired to teach at the Royal Hawaiian Hotel. Duke was 50 years old, Nadine was 35.

He was initiated, passed and raised to the degree of Master Mason in Hawaiian Lodge Masonic Lodge No 21 and was also a Noble (member) of the Shriners fraternal organization. He was a Republican.

== Death and legacy ==
Kahanamoku died of a heart attack on January 22, 1968, at age 77. For his burial at sea, a long motorcade of mourners, accompanied by a 30-man police escort, traveled in procession across town to Waikiki Beach. Reverend Abraham Akaka, the pastor of Kawaiahao Church, performed the service. A group of beach boys sang Hawaiian songs, including "Aloha Oe", and Kahanamoku's ashes were scattered into the ocean.

=== Statues and monuments ===
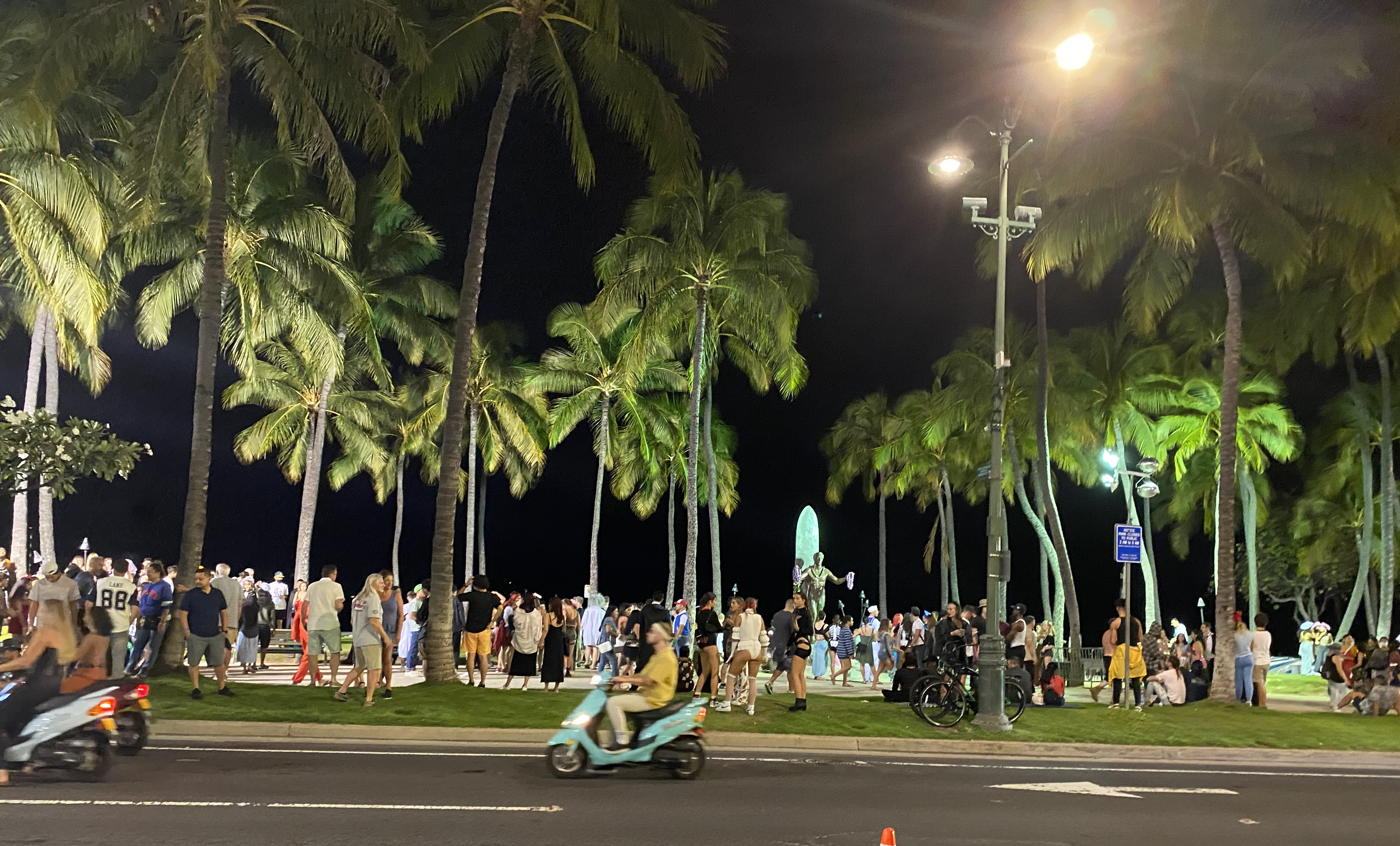
The Duke Statue in Waikiki with people celebrating Halloween, 2021

In 1990, a 9-foot bronze statue of Kahanamoku, by Jan Gordon Fisher, was unveiled in Waikiki, in Honolulu, Hawaii. The statue is not facing the nearby ocean shore, but is facing the street, to welcome tourists and locals, in the spirit of Aloha. The statue was inspired by a photograph of Kahanamoku, with his arms wide open, standing on a surfboard, with his wife Nadine on his shoulders.

In 1994, a statue of Kahanamoku by Barry Donohoo was inaugurated in Freshwater, NSW, Australia. It is the showpiece of the Australian Surfers Walk of Fame.

On February 28, 2015, a monument featuring a replica of Kahanamoku's surfboard was unveiled at New Brighton beach, Christchurch, New Zealand in honor of the 100th anniversary of Kahanamoku's visit to New Brighton.

A statue of Kahanamoku was installed in Huntington Beach, California. A nearby restaurant is named for him and is close to Huntington Beach pier. The City of Huntington Beach identifies with the legacy of surfing, and a museum dedicated to that sport is located here.

In April 2022, NSW Heritage announced that Kahanamoku would be included in the first batch of Blue Plaques to be issued, to recognize his contribution to recreation and surfing.

A sculpture of Kahanamoku flanked by a male knee paddler and a female prone paddler commemorating the Catalina Classic Paddleboard Race was installed on the Manhattan Beach Pier in 2023.

=== Additional tributes ===
Hawaii music promoter Kimo Wilder McVay capitalized on Kahanamoku's popularity by naming his Waikiki showroom "Duke Kahanamoku's" at the International Market Place and giving Kahanamoku a financial interest in the showroom in exchange for the use of his name. It was a major Waikiki showroom in the 1960s and is remembered as the home of Don Ho & The Aliis from 1964 through 1969. The showroom continued to be known as Duke Kahanamoku's until Hawaii showman Jack Cione bought it in the mid-1970s and renamed it Le Boom Boom.

The Duke Kahanamoku Aquatic Complex (DKAC) serves as the home for the University of Hawai‘i's swimming and diving and women's water polo teams. The facility, located on the university's lower campus, includes a 50-meter training pool and a separate 25-yard competition and diving pool. The long course pool is four feet at both ends, seven feet in the middle, and an average depth of six feet.

Kahanamoku's name is also used by Duke's Canoe Club & Barefoot Bar, as of 2016 known as Duke's Waikiki, a beachfront bar and restaurant in the Outrigger Waikiki on the Beach Hotel. There is a chain of restaurants named after him in California, Florida and Hawaii called Duke's.

On August 24, 2002, the 112th anniversary of Kahanamoku's birth, the U.S. Postal Service issued a first-class commemorative stamp with Duke's picture on it. The First Day Ceremony was held at the Hilton Hawaiian Village in Waikiki and was attended by thousands. At this ceremony, attendees could attach the Duke stamp to an envelope and get it canceled with a First Day of Issue postmark. These first day covers are very collectible.

On August 24, 2015, a Google Doodle honored the 125th anniversary of Duke Kahanamoku's birthday.

In 2021, an 88-minute feature documentary film entitled Waterman was made about Kahanamoku's life. It was later broadcast by PBS as part of their American Masters series.

== Filmography ==
Year	Title	Role	Notes
1925	Adventure	Noah Noa	
1925	The Pony Express	Indian Chief	Uncredited
1925	No Father to Guide Him	The Lifeguard	Short
1925	Lord Jim	Tamb Itam	
1926	Old Ironsides	Pirate Captain	Uncredited
1927	Hula	Hawaiian Boy	Uncredited
1927	Isle of Sunken Gold	Lono	
1928	Woman Wise	Guard	
1929	The Rescue	Jaffir	
1929	Where East Is East	Wild Animal Trapper	Uncredited
1930	Girl of the Port	Kalita	
1930	Isle of Escape	Manua	
1931	Around the World with Douglas Fairbanks	Himself	Documentary
1931	The Black Camel	bit part as surf instructor	at 0:01:36
1948	Wake of the Red Witch	Ua Nuke	
1955	Mister Roberts	Native Chief	(as Duke Kahanamoko)
1959	This Is Your Life	Himself	Episode: "Duke Kahanamoku"
1967	Free and Easy	Himself	Documentary
1967	Surfari	Himself	Documentary

== See also ==
- Duke Paoa Kahanamoku Lagoon
- List of multiple Olympic gold medalists
- List of Olympic medalists in swimming (men)
- World record progression 100 metres freestyle
- World record progression 4 × 200 metres freestyle relay
