= Swimming at the 1908 Summer Olympics =

Coordinates: 51.5136°N 0.2274°E

Swimming at the Games of the IV Olympiad
- Venue: White City Stadium
- Dates: 13–25 July 1908
- No. of events: 6
- Competitors: 100 from 14 nations

At the 1908 Summer Olympics in London, six swimming events were contested. These were the first Olympic Games in which a 100-metre pool had been especially constructed (inside the main stadium's track and field oval). Previous Olympic events were swum in open water (1896: The Mediterranean Sea, 1900: The Seine River, 1904: an artificial lake). Only men participated in the swimming events. The competitions were held from Monday, July 13, 1908, to Saturday, July 25, 1908.

All six of the 1908 events became staples of the Olympic swimming programme, and have been contested at every edition of the Games since. The 50 m, 200 m, and 800 m freestyle events were dropped from the previous edition (though these would later return), the relay was lengthened from 4 × 50 yards to 4 × 200 m, and the 400 m breaststroke was shortened to 200 metres.

Canada and Finland made their first appearances in swimming, while Austria, Hungary, and the United States continued their streaks of appearing each time. Fourteen nations competed in all, with 100 swimmers entering the events.

== Medal table ==
* Host nation (Great Britain)

Rank	Nation	Gold	Silver	Bronze	Total
1	Great Britain	4	2	1	7
2	United States	1	0	1	2
3	Germany	1	0	0	1
4	Hungary	0	2	0	2
5	Australasia	0	1	1	2
6	Denmark	0	1	0	1
7	Sweden	0	0	2	2
8	Austria	0	0	1	1
Totals (8 entries)		6	6	6	18

== Medal summary ==
Games	Gold	Silver	Bronze
100 m freestyle	Charles Daniels (USA)	Zoltán Halmay (HUN)	Harald Julin (SWE)
400 m freestyle	Henry Taylor (GBR)	Frank Beaurepaire (ANZ)	Otto Scheff (AUT)
1500 m freestyle	Henry Taylor (GBR)	Thomas Battersby (GBR)	Frank Beaurepaire (ANZ)
100 m backstroke	Arno Bieberstein (GER)	Ludvig Dam (DEN)	Herbert Haresnape (GBR)
200 m breaststroke	Frederick Holman (GBR)	William Robinson (GBR)	Pontus Hanson (SWE)
4 × 200 m freestyle relay	Great Britain; John Derbyshire; Paul Radmilovic; William Foster; Henry Taylor	Hungary; József Munk; Imre Zachár; Béla Las-Torres; Zoltán Halmay	United States; Harry Hebner; Leo Goodwin; Charles Daniels; Leslie Rich

== Participating nations ==
A total of 100 swimmers from 14 nations competed at the London Games:

- Australasia (5)
- Austria (1)
- Belgium (7)
- Canada (1)
- Denmark (5)
- Finland (3)
- France (4)

- Germany (5)
- Great Britain (28)
- Hungary (10)
- Italy (4)
- Netherlands (7)
- Sweden (12)
- United States (8)
