= Swimming at the 1912 Summer Olympics – Men's 100 metre backstroke =

Men's 100 metre backstroke at the Games of the V Olympiad
- Venue: Djurgårdsbrunnsviken
- Dates: July 9–13
- Competitors: 18 from 7 nations

Medalists
1st place, gold medalist(s)		Harry Hebner	United States
2nd place, silver medalist(s)		Otto Fahr	Germany
3rd place, bronze medalist(s)		Paul Kellner	Germany

The men's 100 metre backstroke was a swimming event held as part of the swimming at the 1912 Summer Olympics programme. It was the second appearance of the event, which had been introduced in 1908. In 1904 a 100-yard event was held. The competition was held from Tuesday July 9, 1912 to Saturday July 13, 1912.

Eighteen swimmers from seven nations competed.

== Records ==
These were the standing world and Olympic records (in minutes) prior to the 1912 Summer Olympics.

World record	1:15.6	(Germany) Otto Fahr	Magdeburg (GER)	April 29, 1912
Olympic record	1:24.6	(Germany) Arno Bieberstein	London (GBR)	July 17, 1908

The Olympic record fell during the very first heat. Harry Hebner's 1:21.0 in the first heat stood until Hebner raced again. In the first semifinal, he bettered his own new record with a 1:20.8. He was unable to match that pace in the final, but still took the win with a finish that was over 1 second faster than the second-place swimmer.

== Results ==
=== Quarterfinals ===
The top two in each heat advanced along with the fastest loser overall.

==== Quarterfinal 1 ====
Place	Swimmer	Time	Qual.
1	Harry Hebner (USA)	1:21.0	QS OR
2	Otto Groß (GER)	1:24.0	QS
3	Åke Bergman (SWE)	1:33.8	
—	Oscar Schiele (GER)	DQ	

==== Quarterfinal 2 ====
Place	Swimmer	Time	Qual.
1	Otto Fahr (GER)	1:22.0	QS
2	George Webster (GBR)	1:29.4	QS
3	Hugo Lundevall (SWE)	1:46.8	
—	János Wenk (HUN)	DQ	

==== Quarterfinal 3 ====
Place	Swimmer	Time	Qual.
1	András Baronyi (HUN)	1:22.0	QS
2	Paul Kellner (GER)	1:26.0	QS
3	Harry Svendsen (NOR)	1:47.2	
—	Oscar Grégoire (BEL)	DQ	

==== Quarterfinal 4 ====
Place	Swimmer	Time	Qual.
1	Herbert Haresnape (GBR)	1:27.0	QS
2	Erich Schultze (GER)	1:27.2	QS
3	Gunnar Sundman (SWE)	1:31.2	qs
4	John Johnsen (NOR)	1:34.2	

==== Quarterfinal 5 ====
Place	Swimmer	Time	Qual.
1	László Szentgróthy (HUN)	1:26.6	QS
2	Frank Sandon (GBR)	1:31.8	QS

=== Semifinals ===
The top two from each heat and the faster of the two third place swimmers advanced.

Semifinal 1

Place	Swimmer	Time	Qual.
1	Harry Hebner (USA)	1:20.8	QF OR
2	Otto Fahr (GER)	1:21.8	QF
3	András Baronyi (HUN)	1:26.2	qf
4	László Szentgróthy (HUN)	1:26.4	
5	Erich Schultze (GER)		
6	George Webster (GBR)		

Semifinal 1

Place	Swimmer	Time	Qual.
1	Otto Groß (GER)	1:26.0	QF
2	Paul Kellner (GER)	1:26.2	QF
3	Herbert Haresnape (GBR)	1:26.8	
4	Frank Sandon (GBR)	1:32.2	
—	Gunnar Sundman (SWE)	1:35.0	

=== Final ===
Place	Swimmer	Time
1	Harry Hebner (USA)	1:21.2
2	Otto Fahr (GER)	1:22.4
3	Paul Kellner (GER)	1:24.0
4	András Baronyi (HUN)	1:25.2
5	Otto Groß (GER)	1:25.8

== Notes ==
- Bergvall, Erik, ed. (1913). The Official Report of the Olympic Games of Stockholm 1912. Translated by Adams-Ray, Edward. Stockholm: Wahlström & Widstrand.
- Wudarski, Pawel (1999). "Wyniki Igrzysk Olimpijskich" (in Polish).
