= Swimming at the 1908 Summer Olympics – Men's 100 metre backstroke =

Men's 100 metre backstroke at the Games of the IV Olympiad
- Venue: White City Stadium
- Dates: July 16; July 17
- Competitors: 21 from 11 nations

Medalists
1st place, gold medalist(s)		Arno Bieberstein	Germany
2nd place, silver medalist(s)		Ludvig Dam	Denmark
3rd place, bronze medalist(s)		Herbert Haresnape	Great Britain

The men's 100 metre backstroke was one of six swimming events on the swimming at the 1908 Summer Olympics programme. It was the only backstroke event on the schedule. It was the first appearance of the event, after a 100-yard event was held in 1904. The competition was held on Thursday July 16, 1908 and on Friday July 17, 1908.

Each nation could enter up to 12 swimmers. Twenty-one swimmers from eleven nations competed.

== Records ==
These were the standing world and Olympic records (in minutes) prior to the 1908 Summer Olympics.

World record	?	?		
Olympic record	1:16.8(*)	(Germany) Walter Brack	St. Louis (USA)	September 6, 1904

(*) 100 yards (= 91.44 m)

In the first heat Arno Bieberstein set the first Olympic record with 1:25.6 minutes. In the first semi-final he equalized his time and in the final he bettered his own record with 1:24.6 minutes. The time set in the final was the first official world record for this distance.

== Competition format ==
With a much larger field than in 1904, the 1908 competition expanded to three rounds: heats, semifinals, and a final. The 1908 Games also restored the wild-card system from 1900, allowing the fastest swimmers who did not win their heat to advance. The nine heats consisted of between 1 and 6 swimmers, with the winner of the heat advancing along with the fastest loser from across the heats (all tied swimmers advanced in the case of equal times). There were two semifinals, intended to be of 5 swimmers each but one of which actually had 6 due to a tie in the heats; the top 2 finishers in each semifinal (regardless of overall time) advanced to the 4-person final.

Each race involved a single length of the 100 metre pool, with no turns. There was little regulation of the stroke, other than that the swimmer had to remain on his back and turns had to be made with both hands touching the wall.

== Results ==
=== First round ===
Thursday July 16, 1908: The fastest swimmer in each heat and the fastest loser advanced, qualifying 8 swimmers for the semifinals.

==== Heat 1 ====
Place	Swimmer	Time	Qual.
1	Arno Bieberstein (GER)	1:25.6	QQ OR
2	Frederick Unwin (GBR)	1:30.0	
3	Hugo Jonsson (FIN)	Unknown	

==== Heat 2 ====
Place	Swimmer	Time	Qual.
1	Max Ritter (GER)	1:33.4	QQ
2	Sidney Willis (GBR)	1:34.4	
3	John Henriksson (FIN)	Unknown	

==== Heat 3 ====
Place	Swimmer	Time	Qual.
1	Colin Lewis (GBR)	1:30.2	QQ
2	Bartholomeus Roodenburch (NED)	1:36.2	
3	Robert Zimmerman (CAN)	Unknown	

==== Heat 4 ====
Place	Swimmer	Time	Qual.
1	Herbert Haresnape (GBR)	1:26.2	QQ
2	Ludvig Dam (DEN)	1:26.4	qq
3	Amilcare Beretta (ITA)	Unknown	

==== Heat 5 ====
Parvin had no competition in the fifth heat.

Place	Swimmer	Time	Qual.
1	Sidney Parvin (GBR)	1:35.2	QQ

==== Heat 6 ====
Place	Swimmer	Time	Qual.
1	Jack Taylor (GBR)	1:25.8	QQ
2	Augustus Goessling (USA)	1:29.0	
3	Gustaf Wretman (SWE)	Unknown	
—	Oscar Grégoire (BEL)	Did not finish	

==== Heat 7 ====
Kugler started before the signal, causing him to be disqualified and his first-place finish nullified.

Place	Swimmer	Time	Qual.
1	Gustav Aurisch (GER)	1:27.4	QQ
2	George Cortlever (NED)	Unknown	
3	Eric Seward (GBR)	Unknown	
—	Sándor Kugler (HUN)	(1:27.0)	DSQ

=== Semifinals ===
Thursday July 16, 1908: The fastest two swimmers from each semifinal advanced to the final.

==== Semifinal 1 ====
Place	Swimmer	Time	Qual.
1	Arno Bieberstein (GER)	1:25.6	QF =OR
2	Ludvig Dam (DEN)	Unknown	QF
3	Max Ritter (GER)	Unknown	
4	Sidney Parvin (GBR)	Unknown	

==== Semifinal 2 ====
Place	Swimmer	Time	Qual.
1	Gustav Aurisch (GER)	1:28.2	QF
2	Herbert Haresnape (GBR)	1:28.8	QF
3	Jack Taylor (GBR)	Unknown	
4	Colin Lewis (GBR)	Unknown	

=== Final ===
Friday July 17, 1908.

Place	Swimmer	Time
1	Arno Bieberstein (GER)	1:24.6 WR
2	Ludvig Dam (DEN)	1:26.6
3	Herbert Haresnape (GBR)	1:27.0
4	Gustav Aurisch (GER)	Unknown

== Sources ==
- Cook, Theodore Andrea (1908). The Fourth Olympiad, Being the Official Report. London: British Olympic Association.
- De Wael, Herman (2001). "Swimming 1908". Herman's Full Olympians.
