= 400 metres freestyle =

The 400 metres freestyle is an event in competitive swimming. World records are ratified by World Aquatics (formerly FINA). The current long course world record holders are Germany's Lukas Märtens and Canada's Summer McIntosh, while the current short course world record holders are France's Yannick Agnel, and McIntosh.

The men's event was first contested at the Olympic Games in 1908, while the women's event was introduced in 1924; the current Olympic champions are Märtens, and Australia's Ariarne Titmus. The men's and women's events have been contested at the World Aquatics Championships since the inaugural edition in 1973; the current world champions (long course) are Märtens and McIntosh. The men's and women's events have been contested at the World Aquatics Swimming Championships (25m) since the inaugural edition in 1993; the current world champions (short course) are Australia's Elijah Winnington, and McIntosh.

== World record progression ==
=== Men long course ===
#	Time		Name	Nationality	Date	Meet	Location	Ref
1	5:36.8		Henry Taylor	Great Britain	16 July 1908	Olympic Games	London, United Kingdom	
2	5:35.8		Sydney Battersby	Great Britain	11 September 1911	Local Meet (Kentish Town)	London, United Kingdom	
3	5:29.0		Alajos Kenyery	Hungary	21 April 1912	-	Magdeburg, Germany	
4	5:28.4		Alajos Kenyery	Hungary	5 June 1912	-	Budapest, Hungary	
5	5:24.4		George Hodgson	Canada	14 July 1912	Olympic Games	Stockholm, Sweden	
6	5:21.6		Jack Hatfield	Great Britain	26 September 1912	Local Meet (Shoreditch)	London, United Kingdom	
7	5:14.6		Norman Ross	United States	9 October 1919	-	Los Angeles, United States	
8	5:14.4		Norman Ross	United States	25 September 1921	-	Brighton Beach, United States	
9	5:11.8		Arne Borg	Sweden	9 April 1922	Local Meet	Stockholm, Sweden	
10	5:06.6		Johnny Weissmuller	United States	22 June 1922	-	Honolulu, United States	
11	4:57.0		Johnny Weissmuller	United States	6 March 1923	-	New Haven, United States	
12	4:54.7		Arne Borg	Sweden	9 December 1924	Local Meet	Stockholm, Sweden	
13	4:50.3		Arne Borg	Sweden	11 September 1925	Local Meet	Stockholm, Sweden	
14	4:47.0		Jean Taris	France	16 April 1931	Local Meet	Paris, France	
15	4:46.4		Shozo Makino	Japan	14 August 1933	-	Tokyo, Japan	
16	4:38.7		Jack Medica	United States	30 August 1934	-	Honolulu, United States	
17	4:38.5		Bill Smith	United States	13 May 1941	-	Honolulu, United States	
18	4:35.2		Alex Jany	France	12 September 1947	European Championships	Monte Carlo, Monaco	
19	4:34.6		Hironoshin Furuhashi	Japan	24 July 1949	Local Meet	Tokyo, Japan	
20	4:33.3		Hironoshin Furuhashi	Japan	18 August 1949	US National Championships	Los Angeles, United States	
21	4:33.1		John Marshall	Australia	11 March 1950	Intercollegiate Event	New Haven, United States	
22	4:29.5		John Marshall	Australia	1 April 1950	US National Indoor Championships	New Haven, United States	
-	4:26.9	^{[A]}	John Marshall	Australia	24 March 1951	Sanctioned Time Trial	New Haven, United States	
-	4:26.7	^{[A]}	Ford Konno	United States	3 April 1954	Intercollegiate Event	New Haven, United States	
-	4:25.9	^{[A]}	Murray Rose	Australia	12 January 1957	NSW Championships	Sydney, Australia	
23	4:27.0	^{[A]}	Murray Rose	Australia	27 October 1956	Australian Championships	Melbourne, Australia	
24	4:25.9		John Konrads	Australia	15 January 1958	NSW Championships	Sydney, Australia	
25	4:21.8		John Konrads	Australia	12 January 1959	Australian Championships	Melbourne, Australia	
26	4:19.0		John Konrads	Australia	7 February 1959	International Swim Meet	Sydney, Australia	
27	4:16.6		Tsuyoshi Yamanaka	Japan	26 July 1959	Japan-USA Water Competition	Osaka, Japan	
28	4:15.9		John Konrads	Australia	23 February 1960	Australian Championships	Sydney, Australia	
29	4:13.4		Murray Rose	Australia	17 August 1962	International Invitational	Chicago, United States	
30	4:12.7		Don Schollander	United States	31 July 1964	US National Championships	Los Altos, United States	
31	4:12.2		Don Schollander	United States	15 October 1964	Olympic Games	Tokyo, Japan	
32	4:11.8		John Nelson	United States	18 August 1966	US National Championships	Lincoln, United States	
33	4:11.6		Don Schollander	United States	18 August 1966	US National Championships	Lincoln, United States	
34	4:11.1		Frank Wiegand	East Germany	25 August 1966	European Championships	Utrecht, Netherlands	
35	4:10.6		Mark Spitz	United States	25 June 1967	Local Event	Haywood, United States	
35	4:10.6	=	Alain Mosconi	France	2 July 1967	Local Event	Monte Carlo, Monaco	
37	4:09.2		Alain Mosconi	France	4 July 1967	Local Event	Monte Carlo, Monaco	
38	4:08.8		Mark Spitz	United States	7 July 1967	Santa Clara International	Santa Clara, United States	
39	4:08.2		Greg Charlton	United States	28 August 1967	Summer Universiade	Tokyo, Japan	
40	4:07.7		Mark Spitz	United States	23 June 1968	Annual Swimming Relays	Haywood, United States	
41	4:06.5		Ralph Hutton	Canada	1 August 1968	US National Championships	Lincoln, United States	
42	4:04.0		Hans-Joachim Fassnacht	West Germany	14 August 1969	US National Championships	Louisville, United States	
43	4:02.8		John Kinsella	United States	20 August 1970	US National Championships	Los Angeles, United States	
44	4:02.6		Gunnar Larsson	United States	7 September 1970	European Championships	Barcelona, Spain	
45	4:02.1		Tom McBreen	United States	25 August 1971	US National Championships	Houston, United States	
46	4:01.7		Brad Cooper	Australia	12 February 1972	Australian Championships	Brisbane, Australia	
47	4:00.11		Kurt Krumpholz	United States	4 August 1972	US Olympic Trials	Chicago, United States	
48	3:58.18		Rick DeMont	United States	9 September 1973	World Championships	Belgrade, Yugoslavia	
49	3:56.96	h	Tim Shaw	United States	22 August 1974	US National Championships	Concord, United States	
50	3:54.69		Tim Shaw	United States	22 August 1974	US National Championships	Concord, United States	
51	3:53.95		Tim Shaw	United States	19 June 1975	US World Championship Trials	Long Beach, United States	
52	3:53.31		Tim Shaw	United States	20 August 1975	US National Championships	Kansas City, United States	
53	3:53.08		Brian Goodell	United States	18 June 1976	US Olympic Trials	Long Beach, United States	
54	3:51.93		Brian Goodell	United States	22 July 1976	Olympic Games	Montreal, Canada	
55	3:51.56		Brian Goodell	United States	27 August 1977	USA vs East Germany Dual Meet	West Berlin, West Germany	
56	3:51.41		Vladimir Salnikov	Soviet Union	6 April 1979	Soviet Union vs East Germany Junior Meet	Potsdam, East Germany	
57	3:51.40		Vladimir Salnikov	Soviet Union	19 August 1979	Soviet Union vs Canada Dual Meet	Moscow, Soviet Union	
58	3:51.20		Vladimir Salnikov	Soviet Union	29 February 1980	Soviet Union Winter Championships	Potsdam, East Germany	
59	3:50.49		Peter Szmidt	Canada	16 July 1980	Canadian Championships	Etobicoke, Canada	
60	3:49.57		Vladimir Salnikov	Soviet Union	12 March 1982	Soviet Union vs East Germany Dual Meet	Moscow, Soviet Union	
60	3:49.57	=	Vladimir Salnikov	Soviet Union	14 July 1982	Soviet Union Championships	Kiev, Soviet Union	
62	3:48.32		Vladimir Salnikov	Soviet Union	19 February 1983	Soviet Union Winter Championships	Moscow, Soviet Union	
63	3:47.80		Michael Gross	West Germany	27 June 1985	West German Championships	Wuppertal, West Germany	
64	3:47.38		Artur Wojdat	Poland	25 March 1988	US National Championships	Orlando, United States	
65	3:46.95		Uwe Dassler	East Germany	23 September 1988	Olympic Games	Seoul, South Korea	
66	3:46.47		Kieren Perkins	Australia	3 April 1992	Australian Championships	Canberra, Australia	
67	3:45.00		Yevgeny Sadovyi	Unified Team at the Olympics	29 July 1992	Olympic Games	Barcelona, Spain	
68	3:43.80		Kieren Perkins	Australia	5 September 1994	World Championships	Rome, Italy	
69	3:41.83		Ian Thorpe	Australia	22 August 1999	Pan Pacific Championships	Sydney, Australia	
70	3:41.33		Ian Thorpe	Australia	13 May 2000	Australian Championships	Sydney, Australia	
71	3:40.59		Ian Thorpe	Australia	16 September 2000	Olympic Games	Sydney, Australia	
72	3:40.17		Ian Thorpe	Australia	22 July 2001	World Championships	Fukuoka, Japan	
73	3:40.08		Ian Thorpe	Australia	30 July 2002	Commonwealth Games	Manchester, United Kingdom	
74	3:40.07		Paul Biedermann	Germany	26 July 2009	World Championships	Rome, Italy	
75	3:39.96		Lukas Märtens	Germany	12 April 2025	Stockholm Open	Stockholm, Sweden	

Legend: # – Record awaiting ratification by World Aquatics; e – equalled existing record;
Records not set in finals: h – heat; sf – semifinal; r – relay 1st leg; rh – relay heat 1st leg; b – B final; † – en route to final mark; so – swim-off; tt – time trial
1. As of 1 May 1957, World Aquatics required records to be set in a 50-metre pool. This resulted in the annulment of Murray Rose's world record of 4:25.9. As John Marshall's 4:26.9 and Ford Konno's 4:26.7 were also set in 25-metre pools, the world record was reverted to Rose's 4:27.0 from 1956.

=== Men short course ===
#	Time	Name	Nationality	Date	Meet	Location	Ref
1	3:41.74	Giorgio Lamberti	Italy	13 February 1988	German Invitational	Bonn, West Germany	
2	3:40.81	Anders Holmertz	Sweden	4 February 1990	World Cup	Paris, France	
3	3:40.46	Danyon Loader	New Zealand	11 February 1995	World Cup	Sheffield, United Kingdom	
4	3:39.82	Ian Thorpe	Australia	25 September 1998	Australian Championships	Perth, Australia	
5	3:35.01	Grant Hackett	Australia	2 April 1999	World Championships	Hong Kong	
6	3:34.58	Grant Hackett	Australia	18 July 2002	Swimming Australia Grand Prix	Sydney, Australia	
7	3:32.77	Paul Biedermann	Germany	14 November 2009	World Cup	Berlin, Germany	
8	3:32.25	Yannick Agnel	France	15 November 2012	French Championships	Angers, France	

Legend: # – Record awaiting ratification by World Aquatics; e – equalled existing record;
Records not set in finals: h – heat; sf – semifinal; r – relay 1st leg; rh – relay heat 1st leg; b – B final; † – en route to final mark; so – swim-off; tt – time trial

=== Women long course ===
#	Time	Name	Nationality	Date	Meet	Location	Ref
1	6:30.2	Ethelda Bleibtrey	United States	16 August 1919	-	New York City, United States	
2	6:16.6	Hilda James	Great Britain	29 July 1921	-	Leeds, United Kingdom	
3	5:53.2	Gertrude Ederle	United States	4 August 1922	-	Indianapolis, United States	
4	5:51.4	Martha Norelius	United States	23 January 1927	-	Coral Gables, United States	
5	5:49.6	Martha Norelius	United States	30 June 1928	-	New York City, United States	
6	5:42.8	Martha Norelius	United States	6 August 1928	Olympic Games	Amsterdam, Netherlands	
7	5:39.2	Martha Norelius	United States	27 August 1928	-	Vienna, Austria	
8	5:31.0	Helene Madison	United States	3 February 1931	-	Seattle, United States	
9	5:28.5	Helene Madison	United States	13 August 1932	-	Los Angeles, United States	
10	5:16.0	Willy den Ouden	Netherlands	12 July 1934	-	Rotterdam, Netherlands	
11	5:14.2	Ragnhild Hveger	Denmark	10 February 1937	-	Copenhagen, Denmark	
12	5:14.0	Ragnhild Hveger	Denmark	3 October 1937	-	Ghent, Belgium	
13	5:12.4	Ragnhild Hveger	Denmark	14 November 1937	-	Magdeburg, Germany	
14	5:11.0	Ragnhild Hveger	Denmark	12 December 1937	-	Copenhagen, Denmark	
15	5:08.2	Ragnhild Hveger	Denmark	16 January 1938	-	Copenhagen, Denmark	
16	5:06.1	Ragnhild Hveger	Denmark	1 August 1938	-	Copenhagen, Denmark	
17	5:05.4	Ragnhild Hveger	Denmark	8 September 1940	-	Svendborg, Denmark	
18	5:00.1	Ragnhild Hveger	Denmark	15 September 1940	-	Copenhagen, Denmark	
19	4:50.8	Lorraine Crapp	Australia	25 August 1956	-	Townsville, Australia	
20	4:47.2	Lorraine Crapp	Australia	20 October 1956	-	Sydney, Australia	
21	4:45.4	Ilsa Konrads	Australia	9 January 1960	-	Sydney, Australia	
22	4:44.5	Chris von Saltza	United States	5 August 1960	US Olympic Trials	Detroit, United States	
23	4:42.0	Marilyn Ramenofsky	United States	11 July 1964	-	Los Altos, United States	
24	4:41.7	Marilyn Ramenofsky	United States	1 August 1964	US National Championships	Los Altos, United States	
25	4:39.5	Marilyn Ramenofsky	United States	31 August 1964	-	New York City, United States	
26	4:39.2	Martha Randall	United States	14 August 1965	-	Maumee, United States	
27	4:38.0	Martha Randall	United States	26 August 1965	-	Monaco	
28	4:36.8	Pam Kruse	United States	30 June 1967	-	Fort Lauderdale, United States	
29	4:36.4	Pam Kruse	United States	7 July 1967	Santa Clara International	Santa Clara, United States	
30	4:32.6	Debbie Meyer	United States	27 July 1967	Pan American Games	Winnipeg, Canada	
31	4:29.0	Debbie Meyer	United States	18 August 1967	US National Championships	Philadelphia, United States	
32	4:26.7	Debbie Meyer	United States	1 August 1967	US National Championships	Lincoln, United States	
33	4:24.6	Debbie Meyer	United States	25 August 1968	US Olympic Trials	Los Angeles, United States	
34	4:24.3	Debbie Meyer	United States	20 August 1970	US National Championships	Los Angeles, United States	
35	4:22.6	Karen Moras	Australia	30 April 1971	Coca-Cola International	London, United Kingdom	
36	4:21.2	Shane Gould	Australia	9 July 1971	Santa Clara International	Santa Clara, United States	
37	4:19.04	Shane Gould	Australia	30 August 1972	Olympic Games	Munich, West Germany	
38	4:18.07	Keena Rothhammer	United States	22 August 1973	US National Championships	Louisville, United States	
39	4:17.33	Heather Greenwood	United States	28 June 1974	Santa Clara International	Santa Clara, United States	
40	4:15.77	Shirley Babashoff	United States	22 August 1974	US National Championships	Concord, United States	
41	4:14.76	Shirley Babashoff	United States	20 June 1975	US World Championships Trials	Long Beach, United States	
42	4:11.69	Barbara Krause	East Germany	3 June 1976	East German Championships	East Berlin, East Germany	
43	4:09.89	Petra Thümer	East Germany	20 July 1976	Olympic Games	Montreal, Canada	
44	4:08.91	Petra Thümer	East Germany	17 August 1977	European Championships	Jönköping, Sweden	
45	4:07.66	Kim Linehan	United States	2 August 1978	US National Championships	The Woodlands, United States	
46	4:06.28	Tracey Wickham	Australia	24 August 1978	World Championships	West Berlin, West Germany	
47	4:05.45	Janet Evans	United States	20 December 1987	US Open	Orlando, United States	
48	4:03.85	Janet Evans	United States	22 September 1988	Olympic Games	Seoul, South Korea	
49	4:03.03	Laure Manaudou	France	12 May 2006	French Championships	Tours, France	
50	4:02.13	Laure Manaudou	France	6 August 2006	European Championships	Budapest, Hungary	
51	4:01.53	Federica Pellegrini	Italy	24 March 2008	European Championships	Eindhoven, Netherlands	
52	4:00.66	Joanne Jackson	Great Britain	16 March 2009	British Championships	Sheffield, Great Britain	
53	4:00.41	Federica Pellegrini	Italy	27 June 2009	Mediterranean Games	Pescara, Italy	
54	3:59.15	Federica Pellegrini	Italy	26 July 2009	World Championships	Rome, Italy	
55	3:58.86	Katie Ledecky	United States	9 August 2014	US National Championships	Irvine, United States	
56	3:58.37	Katie Ledecky	United States	23 August 2014	Pan Pacific Championships	Gold Coast, Australia	
57	3:56.46	Katie Ledecky	United States	7 August 2016	Olympic Games	Rio de Janeiro, Brazil	
58	3:56.40	Ariarne Titmus	Australia	22 May 2022	Australian Championships	Adelaide, Australia	
59	3:56.08	Summer McIntosh	Canada	28 March 2023	Canadian Trials	Toronto, Canada	
60	3:55.38	Ariarne Titmus	Australia	23 July 2023	World Championships	Fukuoka, Japan	
61	3:54.18	Summer McIntosh	Canada	7 June 2025	Canadian Trials	Victoria, Canada	

Legend: # – Record awaiting ratification by World Aquatics; e – equalled existing record;
Records not set in finals: h – heat; sf – semifinal; r – relay 1st leg; rh – relay heat 1st leg; b – B final; † – en route to final mark; so – swim-off; tt – time trial

=== Women short course ===
#	Time	Name	Nationality	Date	Meet	Location	Ref
1	4:02.59	Cynthia Woodhead	United States	1 April 1979	-	Austin, United States	
2	4:02.05	Astrid Strauss	East Germany	8 February 1987	Bonn Arena Festival	Bonn, West Germany	
3	4:00.03	Claudia Poll	Costa Rica	18 April 1997	World Championships	Gothenburg, Sweden	
4	3:59.53	Lindsay Benko	United States	26 January 2003	World Cup	Berlin, Germany	
5	3:56.79	Laure Manaudou	France	10 December 2005	European Championships	Trieste, Italy	
6	3:56.09	Laure Manaudou	France	9 December 2006	European Championships	Helsinki, Finland	
7	3:54.92	Joanne Jackson	Great Britain	8 August 2009	British Grand Prix	Leeds, Great Britain	
8	3:54.85	Camille Muffat	France	24 November 2012	European Championships	Chartres, France	
9	3:54.52	Mireia Belmonte	Spain	11 August 2013	World Cup	Berlin, Germany	
10	3:53.97	Wang Jianjiahe	China	4 October 2018	World Cup	Budapest, Hungary	
11	3:53.92	Ariarne Titmus	Australia	14 December 2018	World Championships	Hangzhou, China	
12	3:51.30	Li Bingjie	China	27 October 2022	Chinese National Championships	Beijing, China	
13	3:50.25	Summer McIntosh	Canada	10 December 2024	World Championships	Budapest, Hungary	

== All-time top 25 ==
Tables show data for two definitions of "Top 25" - the top 25 400 m freestyle times and the top 25 athletes:
- denotes top performance for athletes in the top 25 400 m freestyle times
- denotes lesser performances, still in the top 25 400 m freestyle times, by repeat athletes
- denotes top performance (only) for other top 25 athletes who fall outside the top 25 400 m freestyle times

=== Men long course ===
- Correct as of September 2026

Ath.#	Perf.#	Time	Athlete	Nation	Date	Place	Ref.
1	1	3:39.96	Lukas Märtens	Germany	12 April 2025	Stockholm	
2	2	3:40.07	Paul Biedermann	Germany	26 July 2009	Rome	
3	3	3:40.08	Ian Thorpe	Australia	30 July 2002	Manchester	
4	4	3:40.14	Sun Yang	China	28 July 2012	London	
	5	3:40.17	Thorpe #2		22 July 2001	Fukuoka	
	6	3:40.29	Sun #2		23 September 2011	Rizhao	
	7	3:40.33	Märtens #2		25 April 2024	Berlin	
5	8	3:40.52	Samuel Short	Australia	14 August 2026	Irvine	
	9	3:40.54	Thorpe #3		18 March 2002	Brisbane	
	10	3:40.59	Thorpe #4		16 September 2000	Sydney	
	11	3:40.61	Märtens #3		1 May 2025	Berlin	
	12	3:40.67	Short #2		8 June 2026	Sydney	
	13	3:40.68	Short #3		23 July 2023	Fukuoka	
6	14	3:40.70	Ahmed Hafnaoui	Tunisia	23 July 2023	Fukuoka	
	15	3:40.76	Thorpe #5		24 March 2001	Hobart	
	16	3:41.03	Short #4		9 June 2025	Adelaide	
7	17	3:41.11	Oussama Mellouli	Tunisia	26 July 2009	Rome	
8	18	3:41.22	Elijah Winnington	Australia	18 June 2022	Budapest	
	19	3:41.25	Short #5		25 July 2026	Glasgow	
9	20	3:41.28	Zhang Zhanshuo	China	25 September 2026	Tokyo	
	21	3:41.33	Thorpe #6		13 May 2000	Sydney	
10	22	3:41.35	Zhang Lin	China	26 July 2009	Rome	
	23	3:41.38	Sun #3		23 July 2017	Budapest	
	24	3:41.41	Winnington #2		17 April 2024	Gold Coast	
	25	3:41.48	Sun #4		5 April 2011	Wuhan	
11		3:41.53	Park Tae-hwan	South Korea	16 November 2010	Guangzhou	
12		3:41.55	Mack Horton	Australia	6 August 2016	Rio de Janeiro	
13		3:42.42	Kim Woo-min	South Korea	1 June 2024	Monaco	
14		3:42.51	Grant Hackett	Australia	22 July 2001	Fukuoka	
15		3:42.76	Guilherme Costa	Brazil	27 July 2024	Paris	
16		3:42.78	Larsen Jensen	United States	10 August 2008	Beijing	
17		3:42.81	Oliver Klemet	Germany	19 April 2024	Magdeburg	
18		3:43.11	Peter Vanderkaay	United States	10 August 2008	Beijing	
19		3:43.14	Léon Marchand	France	16 August 2026	Paris	
20		3:43.23	Gabriele Detti	Italy	19 July 2019	Gwangju	
21		3:43.24	Felix Auböck	Austria	23 June 2024	Belgrade	
22		3:43.27	Jack McLoughlin	Australia	12 June 2021	Adelaide	
23		3:43.33	Rex Maurer	United States	6 June 2025	Indianapolis	
24		3:43.36	Danas Rapsys	Lithuania	12 May 2019	Budapest	
25		3:43.40	Massimiliano Rosolino	Italy	16 September 2000	Sydney	

=== Men short course ===
- Correct as of October 2026

Ath.#	Perf.#	Time	Athlete	Nation	Date	Place	Ref.
1	1	3:32.25	Yannick Agnel	France	15 November 2012	Angers	
2	2	3:32.77	Paul Biedermann	Germany	14 November 2009	Berlin	
3	3	3:33.20	Danas Rapšys	Lithuania	4 December 2019	Glasgow	
	4	3:34.01	Rapšys #2		11 December 2018	Hangzhou	
4	5	3:34.32	Péter Bernek	Hungary	5 December 2014	Doha	
5	6	3:34.38	Kieran Smith	United States	15 December 2022	Melbourne	
6	7	3:34.46	Duncan Scott	Great Britain	31 October 2024	Singapore	
	8	3:34.55	Biedermann #2		10 December 2009	Istanbul	
7	9	3:34.58	Grant Hackett	Australia	18 July 2002	Sydney	
8	10	3:34.59	Park Tae-hwan	South Korea	6 December 2016	Windsor	
9	11	3:34.63	Ian Thorpe	Australia	21 January 2003	Stockholm	
10	12	3:34.66	Zhang Lin	China	22 February 2009	Tokyo	
11	13	3:34.81	Peter Vanderkaay	United States	22 February 2009	Tokyo	
	14	3:34.98	Biedermann #3		30 November 2008	Essen	
	15	3:35.01	Hackett #2		2 April 1999	Hong Kong	
12	16	3:35.05	Thomas Neill	Australia	15 December 2022	Melbourne	
	17	3:35.16	Hackett #3		19 July 2008	Melbourne	
13	17	3:35.16	Samuel Short	Australia	1 October 2026	Sydney	
14	19	3:35.30	Aleksandr Krasnykh	Russia	6 December 2016	Windsor	
	20	3:35.36	Hackett #4		31 August 2007	Melbourne	
15	21	3:35.45	Zhang Zhanshuo	China	28 October 2026	Beijing	
	22	3:35.46	Bernek #2		2 December 2015	Netanya	
16	23	3:35.47	Daniel Wiffen	Ireland	5 December 2023	Otopeni	
	24	3:35.49	Rapšys #3		1 November 2020	Budapest	
	25	3:35.51	Krasnykh #2		13 December 2017	Copenhagen	
17		3:35.67	Luke Hobson	United States	26 August 2022	Sydney	
18		3:35.75	Nikita Lobintsev	Russia	10 December 2009	Istanbul	
19		3:35.89	Elijah Winnington	Australia	12 December 2024	Budapest	
20		3:35.90	Felix Auböck	Austria	16 December 2021	Abu Dhabi	
21		3:36.01	Lucas Henveaux	Belgium	16 October 2026	Astana	
22		3:36.07	Carson Foster	United States	1 October 2026	Baku	
23		3:36.09	Tyler Melbourne-Smith	Great Britain	11 December 2025	Sheffield	
24		3:36.30	Matthew Sates	South Africa	21 October 2022	Berlin	
25		3:36.33	Jack McMillan	Great Britain	2 December 2025	Lublin	

=== Women long course ===
- Correct as of August 2026

Ath.#	Perf.#	Time	Athlete	Nation	Date	Place	Ref.
1	1	3:54.18	Summer McIntosh	Canada	7 June 2025	Victoria	
	2	3:55.37	McIntosh #2		4 December 2025	Austin	
2	3	3:55.38	Ariarne Titmus	Australia	23 July 2023	Fukuoka	
	4	3:55.44	Titmus #2		10 June 2024	Brisbane	
	5	3:56.08	McIntosh #3		28 March 2023	Toronto	
	6	3:56.26	McIntosh #4		27 July 2025	Singapore	
	7	3:56.40	Titmus #3		22 May 2022	Adelaide	
3	8	3:56.46	Katie Ledecky	United States	7 August 2016	Rio de Janeiro	
	9	3:56.69	Titmus #4		26 July 2021	Tokyo	
	10	3:56.81	Ledecky #2		1 May 2025	Fort Lauderdale	
	11	3:56.90	Titmus #5		13 June 2021	Adelaide	
	12	3:57.36	Ledecky #3		26 July 2021	Tokyo	
	13	3:57.49	Titmus #6		27 July 2024	Paris	
	14	3:57.94	Ledecky #4		27 May 2018	Indianapolis	
	15	3:58.06	Titmus #7		3 August 2022	Birmingham	
	16	3:58.15	Ledecky #5		18 June 2022	Budapest	
4	17	3:58.21	Li Bingjie	China	27 July 2025	Singapore	
	18	3:58.28	McIntosh #5		1 May 2025	Fort Lauderdale	
	19	3:58.34	Ledecky #6		23 July 2017	Budapest	
	20	3:58.35	Ledecky #7		15 June 2024	Indianapolis	
	21	3:58.37	Ledecky #8		23 August 2014	Gold Coast	
	21	3:58.37	McIntosh #6		27 July 2024	Paris	
5	23	3:58.42	Lani Pallister	Australia	14 August 2026	Irvine	
	24	3:58.44	Ledecky #9		30 June 2017	Indianapolis	
	25	3:58.47	Titmus #8		13 June 2023	Melbourne	
6		3:59.15	Federica Pellegrini	Italy	26 July 2009	Rome	
7		3:59.44	Erika Fairweather	New Zealand	11 February 2024	Doha	
8		4:00.05	Claire Weinstein	United States	6 June 2025	Indianapolis	
9		4:00.60	Joanne Jackson	Great Britain	26 July 2009	Rome	
10		4:00.65	Leah Smith	United States	27 June 2016	Omaha	
11		4:00.79	Rebecca Adlington	Great Britain	26 July 2009	Rome	
12		4:01.13	Camille Muffat	France	18 March 2012	Dunkirk	
13		4:01.23	Jazmin Carlin	Great Britain	7 August 2016	Rio de Janeiro	
14		4:01.31	Ajna Késely	Hungary	21 July 2019	Gwangju	
15		4:01.34	Simona Quadarella	Italy	16 August 2026	Paris	
16		4:01.77	Allison Schmitt	United States	29 July 2012	London	
17		4:01.90	Yang Peiqi	China	10 November 2025	Shenzhen	
18		4:01.95	Tang Muhan	China	20 September 2021	Xi'an	
19		4:02.08	Paige Madden	United States	15 June 2024	Indianapolis	
20		4:02.13	Laure Manaudou	France	31 July 2006	Budapest	
21		4:02.14	Isabel Gose	Germany	27 July 2024	Paris	
22		4:02.20	Katie Hoff	United States	16 February 2008	Columbia	
23		4:02.35	Chen Qian	China	17 October 2009	Jinan	
24		4:02.37	Boglárka Kapás	Hungary	7 August 2016	Rio de Janeiro	
25		4:02.47	Melani Costa	Spain	28 July 2013	Barcelona	

=== Women short course ===
- Correct as of October 2026

Ath.#	Perf.#	Time	Athlete	Nation	Date	Place	Ref.
1	1	3:50.25	Summer McIntosh	Canada	10 December 2024	Budapest	
2	2	3:51.30	Li Bingjie	China	27 October 2022	Beijing	
3	3	3:51.87	Lani Pallister	Australia	23 October 2025	Toronto	
	4	3:52.42	Pallister #2		17 October 2025	Westmont	
	5	3:52.80	McIntosh #2		28 October 2022	Toronto	
4	6	3:52.88	Katie Ledecky	United States	28 October 2022	Toronto	
	7	3:53.73	Pallister #3		10 December 2024	Budapest	
5	8	3:53.92	Ariarne Titmus	Australia	14 December 2018	Hangzhou	
6	9	3:53.97	Wang Jianjiahe	China	4 October 2018	Budapest	
	10	3:54.04	Ledecky #2		3 November 2022	Indianapolis	
	11	3:54.06	Ledecky #3		6 October 2019	Indianapolis	
	12	3:54.16	Pallister #4		25 October 2025	Toronto	
7	13	3:54.33	Isabel Gose	Germany	2 December 2025	Lublin	
	14	3:54.38	Pallister #5		10 October 2025	Carmel	
8	15	3:54.52	Mireia Belmonte	Spain	11 August 2013	Berlin	
	16	3:54.55	Pallister #6		1 October 2026	Sydney	
	17	3:54.56	Wang #2		14 December 2018	Hangzhou	
	18	3:54.58	Titmus #2		27 October 2020	Brisbane	
	19	3:54.63	Wang #3		28 September 2018	Eindhoven	
9	20	3:54.85	Camille Muffat	France	24 November 2012	Chartres	
10	21	3:54.88	Mary-Sophie Harvey	Canada	10 December 2024	Budapest	
11	22	3:54.92	Joanne Jackson	Great Britain	8 August 2009	Leeds	
	23	3:54.93	Muffat #2		21 October 2012	Berlin	
	24	3:55.04	Pallister #7		13 December 2022	Melbourne	
12	25	3:55.12	Paige Madden	United States	10 December 2024	Budapest	
13		3:55.16	Lauren Boyle	New Zealand	8 August 2013	Eindhoven	
14		3:55.89	Allison Schmitt	United States	18 December 2009	Manchester	
15		3:56.00	Erika Fairweather	New Zealand	13 December 2022	Melbourne	
16		3:56.09	Laure Manaudou	France	9 December 2006	Helsinki	
17		3:56.12	Claire Weinstein	United States	10 December 2024	Budapest	
18		3:56.24	Coralie Balmy	France	16 November 2008	Berlin	
19		3:56.52	Siobhán Haughey	Hong Kong	21 October 2022	Berlin	
20		3:56.70	Simona Quadarella	Italy	2 December 2025	Lublin	
21		3:56.71	Freya Colbert	Great Britain	2 December 2025	Lublin	
22		3:56.84	Melani Costa	Spain	8 August 2013	Eindhoven	
23		3:57.07	Katie Hoff	United States	17 December 2010	Dubai	
24		3:57.45	Holly Hibbott	Great Britain	21 December 2019	Las Vegas	
25		3:57.59	Federica Pellegrini	Italy	6 March 2011	Rome	

== Olympic champions ==
=== Men ===
Edition	Winner	Time	Notes	Ref.
(United Kingdom) London 1908	Henry Taylor (GBR)	5:36.8	WR	
(Sweden) Stockholm 1912	George Hodgson (CAN)	5:24.4	WR	
(Belgium) Antwerp 1920	Norman Ross (USA)	5:26.8		
(France) Paris 1924	Johnny Weissmuller (USA)	5:04.2	OR	
(Netherlands) Amsterdam 1928	Alberto Zorrilla (ARG)	5:01.6	OR	
(United States) Los Angeles 1932	Buster Crabbe (USA)	4:48.4	OR	
(Nazi Germany) Berlin 1936	Jack Medica (USA)	4:45.5	OR	
(United Kingdom) London 1948	Bill Smith (USA)	4:41.0	OR	
(Finland) Helsinki 1952	Jean Boiteux (FRA)	4:30.7	OR	
(Australia) Melbourne 1956	Murray Rose (AUS)	4:27.3	OR	
(Italy) Rome 1960	Murray Rose (AUS)	4:18.3	OR	
(Japan) Tokyo 1964	Don Schollander (USA)	4:12.2	WR	
Mexico City 1968	Mike Burton (USA)	4:09.0	OR	
(West Germany) Munich 1972	Brad Cooper (AUS)	4:00.27	OR	
(Canada) Montreal 1976	Brian Goodell (USA)	3:51.93	WR	
(Soviet Union) Moscow 1980	Vladimir Salnikov (URS)	3:51.31	OR	
(United States) Los Angeles 1984	George DiCarlo (USA)	3:51.23	(Note: Thomas Fahrner set an Olympic record of 3:50.91 in the b-final.)	
(South Korea) Seoul 1988	Uwe Dassler (GDR)	3:46.95	WR	
(Spain) Barcelona 1992	Yevgeny Sadovyi (EUN)	3:45.00	WR	
(United States) Atlanta 1996	Danyon Loader (NZL)	3:47.97		
(Australia) Sydney 2000	Ian Thorpe (AUS)	3:40.59	WR	
(Greece) Athens 2004	Ian Thorpe (AUS)	3:43.10		
(China) Beijing 2008	Park Tae-hwan (KOR)	3:41.86		
(United Kingdom) London 2012	Sun Yang (CHN)	3:40.14	OR	
(Brazil) Rio de Janeiro 2016	Mack Horton (AUS)	3:41.55		
(Japan) Tokyo 2020	Ahmed Hafnaoui (TUN)	3:43.36		
(France) Paris 2024	Lukas Märtens (GER)	3:41.78		

=== Women ===
Edition	Winner	Time	Notes	Ref.
(France) Paris 1924	Martha Norelius (USA)	6:02.2	OR	
(Netherlands) Amsterdam 1928	Martha Norelius (USA)	5:42.8	WR	
(United States) Los Angeles 1932	Helene Madison (USA)	5:28.5	WR	
(Nazi Germany) Berlin 1936	Rie Mastenbroek (NED)	5:26.4	OR	
(United Kingdom) London 1948	Ann Curtis (USA)	5:17.8	OR	
(Finland) Helsinki 1952	Valéria Gyenge (HUN)	5:12.1	OR	
(Australia) Melbourne 1956	Lorraine Crapp (AUS)	4:54.6	OR	
(Italy) Rome 1960	Chris von Saltza (USA)	4:50.6	OR	
(Japan) Tokyo 1964	Ginny Duenkel (USA)	4:43.3	OR	
Mexico City 1968	Debbie Meyer (USA)	4:31.8	OR	
(West Germany) Munich 1972	Shane Gould (AUS)	4:19.04	WR	
(Canada) Montreal 1976	Petra Thümer (GDR)	4:09.89	WR	
(Soviet Union) Moscow 1980	Ines Diers (GDR)	4:08.76	OR	
(United States) Los Angeles 1984	Tiffany Cohen (USA)	4:07.10	OR	
(South Korea) Seoul 1988	Janet Evans (USA)	4:03.85	WR	
(Spain) Barcelona 1992	Dagmar Hase (GER)	4:07.18		
(United States) Atlanta 1996	Michelle Smith (IRL)	4:07.25		
(Australia) Sydney 2000	Brooke Bennett (USA)	4:05.80		
(Greece) Athens 2004	Laure Manaudou (FRA)	4:05.34		
(China) Beijing 2008	Rebecca Adlington (GBR)	4:03.22	(Note: Federica Pellegrini set an Olympic record of 4:02.19 in the heats.)	
(United Kingdom) London 2012	Camille Muffat (FRA)	4:01.45	OR	
(Brazil) Rio de Janeiro 2016	Katie Ledecky (USA)	3:56.46	WR	
(Japan) Tokyo 2020	Ariarne Titmus (AUS)	3:56.69		
(France) Paris 2024	Ariarne Titmus (AUS)	3:57.49		

== World champions (long course) ==
=== Men ===
Edition	Winner	Time	Notes	Ref.
(Socialist Federal Republic of Yugoslavia) Belgrade 1973	Rick DeMont (USA)	3:58.18	WR	
(Colombia) Cali 1975	Tim Shaw (USA)	3:54.88	CR	
(West Germany) West Berlin 1978	Vladimir Salnikov (URS)	3:51.94	CR	
(Ecuador) Guayaquil 1982	Vladimir Salnikov (URS)	3:51.30	CR	
(Spain) Madrid 1986	Rainer Henkel (FRG)	3:50.05	CR	
(Australia) Perth 1991	Jörg Hoffmann (GER)	3:48.04	CR	
(Italy) Rome 1994	Kieren Perkins (AUS)	3:43.80	WR	
(Australia) Perth 1998	Ian Thorpe (AUS)	3:46.29		
(Japan) Fukuoka 2001	Ian Thorpe (AUS)	3:40.17	WR	
(Spain) Barcelona 2003	Ian Thorpe (AUS)	3:42.58		
(Canada) Montreal 2005	Grant Hackett (AUS)	3:42.91		
(Australia) Melbourne 2007	Park Tae-hwan (KOR)	3:44.30		
(Italy) Rome 2009	Paul Biedermann (GER)	3:40.07	WR	
(China) Shanghai 2011	Park Tae-hwan (KOR)	3:42.04		
(Spain) Barcelona 2013	Sun Yang (CHN)	3:41.59		
(Russia) Kazan 2015	Sun Yang (CHN)	3:42.58		
(Hungary) Budapest 2017	Sun Yang (CHN)	3:41.38		
(South Korea) Gwangju 2019	Sun Yang (CHN)	3:42.44		
(Hungary) Budapest 2022	Elijah Winnington (AUS)	3:41.22		
(Japan) Fukuoka 2023	Samuel Short (AUS)	3:40.68		
(Qatar) Doha 2024	Kim Woo-min (KOR)	3:42.71		
Singapore 2025	Lukas Märtens (GER)	3:42.35		

=== Women ===
Edition	Winner	Time	Notes	Ref.
(Socialist Federal Republic of Yugoslavia) Belgrade 1973	Heather Greenwood (USA)	4:20.28	CR	
(Colombia) Cali 1975	Shirley Babashoff (USA)	4:16.87	CR	
(West Germany) West Berlin 1978	Tracey Wickham (AUS)	4:06.28	WR	
(Ecuador) Guayaquil 1982	Carmela Schmidt (GDR)	4:08.98		
(Spain) Madrid 1986	Heike Friedrich (GDR)	4:07.45		
(Australia) Perth 1991	Janet Evans (USA)	4:08.63		
(Italy) Rome 1994	Yang Aihua (CHN)	4:09.64		
(Australia) Perth 1998	Chen Yan (CHN)	4:06.72		
(Japan) Fukuoka 2001	Yana Klochkova (UKR)	4:07.30		
(Spain) Barcelona 2003	Hannah Stockbauer (GER)	4:06.75		
(Canada) Montreal 2005	Laure Manaudou (FRA)	4:06.44		
(Australia) Melbourne 2007	Laure Manaudou (FRA)	4:02.61	CR	
(Italy) Rome 2009	Federica Pellegrini (ITA)	3:59.15	WR	
(China) Shanghai 2011	Federica Pellegrini (ITA)	4:01.97		
(Spain) Barcelona 2013	Katie Ledecky (USA)	3:59.82		
(Russia) Kazan 2015	Katie Ledecky (USA)	3:59.13	CR	
(Hungary) Budapest 2017	Katie Ledecky (USA)	3:58.34	CR	
(South Korea) Gwangju 2019	Ariarne Titmus (AUS)	3:58.76		
(Hungary) Budapest 2022	Katie Ledecky (USA)	3:58.15	CR	
(Japan) Fukuoka 2023	Ariarne Titmus (AUS)	3:55.38	WR	
(Qatar) Doha 2024	Erika Fairweather (NZL)	3:59.44		
Singapore 2025	Summer McIntosh (CAN)	3:56.26		

== World champions (short course) ==
=== Men ===
Edition	Winner	Time	Notes	Ref.
(Spain) Palma de Mallorca 1993	Daniel Kowalski (AUS)	3:42.95	CR	
(Brazil) Rio de Janeiro 1995	Daniel Kowalski (AUS)	3:45.14		
(Sweden) Gothenburg 1997	Jacob Carstensen (DEN)	3:43.44		
Hong Kong 1999	Grant Hackett (AUS)	3:35.01	WR	
(Greece) Athens 2000	Chad Carvin (USA)	3:41.13		
(Russia) Moscow 2002	Grant Hackett (AUS)	3:38.29		
(United States) Indianapolis 2004	Yuri Prilukov (RUS)	3:40.79		
(China) Shanghai 2006	Yuri Prilukov (RUS)	3:38:08		
(United Kingdom) Manchester 2008	Yuri Prilukov (RUS)	3:37.35		
(United Arab Emirates) Dubai 2010	Paul Biedermann (GER)	3:37.06		
(Turkey) Istanbul 2012	Paul Biedermann (GER)	3:39.15		
(Qatar) Doha 2014	Péter Bernek (HUN)	3:34.32	CR	
(Canada) Windsor 2016	Park Tae-hwan (KOR)	3:34.59		
(China) Hangzhou 2018	Danas Rapšys (LTU)	3:34.01	CR	
(United Arab Emirates) Abu Dhabi 2021	Felix Auböck (AUT)	3:35.90		
(Australia) Melbourne 2022	Kieran Smith (USA)	3:34.38		
(Hungary) Budapest 2024	Elijah Winnington (AUS)	3:35.89		

=== Women ===
Edition	Winner	Time	Notes	Ref.
(Spain) Palma de Mallorca 1993	Janet Evans (USA)	4:05.64	CR	
(Brazil) Rio de Janeiro 1995	Claudia Poll (CRC)	4:05.18	CR	
(Sweden) Gothenburg 1997	Claudia Poll (CRC)	4:00.03	WR	
Hong Kong 1999	Nadezhda Chemezova (RUS)	4:05.23		
(Greece) Athens 2000	Lindsay Benko (USA)	4:02.44		
(Russia) Moscow 2002	Yana Klochkova (UKR)	4:01.26		
(United States) Indianapolis 2004	Kaitlin Sandeno (USA)	4:02.01		
(China) Shanghai 2006	Kate Ziegler (USA)	4:01.79		
(United Kingdom) Manchester 2008	Kylie Palmer (AUS)	3:59.23	CR	
(United Arab Emirates) Dubai 2010	Katie Hoff (USA)	3:57.07	CR	
(Turkey) Istanbul 2012	Melanie Costa (ESP)	4:01.18		
(Qatar) Doha 2014	Mireia Belmonte (ESP)	3:55.76	CR	
(Canada) Windsor 2016	Leah Smith (USA)	3:57.78		
(China) Hangzhou 2018	Ariarne Titmus (AUS)	3:53.92	WR	
(United Arab Emirates) Abu Dhabi 2021	Li Bingjie (CHN)	3:55.83		
(Australia) Melbourne 2022	Lani Pallister (AUS)	3:55.04		
(Hungary) Budapest 2024	Summer McIntosh (CAN)	3:50.25	WR	
