= Swimming at the 1912 Summer Olympics – Men's 400 metre freestyle =

Men's 400 metre freestyle at the Games of the V Olympiad
- Venue: Djurgårdsbrunnsviken
- Dates: July 11–14
- Competitors: 26 from 13 nations

Medalists
1st place, gold medalist(s)		George Hodgson	Canada
2nd place, silver medalist(s)		John Hatfield	Great Britain
3rd place, bronze medalist(s)		Harold Hardwick	Australasia

The men's 400 metre freestyle was a swimming event held as part of the swimming at the 1912 Summer Olympics programme. It was the third appearance of the event, which had been introduced in 1904. The competition was held from Thursday July 11, 1912 to Sunday July 14, 1912.

Twenty-six swimmers from 13 nations competed.

== Records ==
These were the standing world and Olympic records (in minutes) prior to the 1912 Summer Olympics.

World record	5:28.4	(Hungary) Béla Las-Torres	Budapest (HUN)	June 5, 1912
Olympic record	5:36.8	(United Kingdom) Henry Taylor	London (GBR)	July 16, 1908

In the first heat Harold Hardwick set a new Olympic record with 5:36.0 minutes. In the fifth heat Cecil Healy improved the Olympic record with 5:34.0 minutes. In the first semi-final George Hodgson set a world record with 5:25.4 minutes and in the final he improved his record again with 5:24.4 minutes.

== Results ==
=== Quarterfinals ===
The top two in each heat advanced along with the fastest loser overall.

==== Heat 1 ====
Place	Swimmer	Time	Qual.
1	Harold Hardwick (ANZ)	5:36.0	QS OR
2	Malcolm Champion (ANZ)	5:37.0	QS
3	James Reilly (USA)	6:10.2	
4	Nils-Erik Haglund (SWE)	6:23.4	
5	Davide Baiardo (ITA)		
—	Mario Massa (ITA)	DNF	

==== Heat 2 ====
Place	Swimmer	Time	Qual.
1	Thomas Battersby (GBR)	6:03.6	QS
2	John Johnsen (NOR)	6:14.4	QS
3	Eskil Wedholm (SWE)	6:29.8	
—	Pavel Avksentyev (RUS)	DNF	

==== Heat 3 ====
Place	Swimmer	Time	Qual.
1	Max Ritter (GER)	5:44.6	QS
2	Alajos Kenyery (HUN)	5:46.0	QS
3	Nicholas Nerich (USA)	5:50.4	qs
—	Theodore Tartakover (ANZ)	DNF	
—	David Theander (SWE)	DNF	

==== Heat 4 ====
Place	Swimmer	Time	Qual.
1	Béla Las-Torres (HUN)	5:36.2	QS
2	Henry Taylor (GBR)	5:48.4	QS
—	Nikolay Voronkov (RUS)	DNF	

==== Heat 5 ====
Place	Swimmer	Time	Qual.
1	Cecil Healy (ANZ)	5:34.0	QS OR
2	John Hatfield (GBR)	5:35.6	QS
3	Franz Schuh (AUT)	6:09.4	

==== Heat 6 ====
Place	Swimmer	Time	Qual.
1	George Hodgson (CAN)	5:50.6	QS
2	William Foster (GBR)	5:52.4	QS
3	Oscar Schiele (GER)	5:57.0	
4	George Godfrey (RSA)	6:30.6	
5	Harry Hedegaard (DEN)	7:07.8	

=== Semifinals ===
The top two from each heat and the faster of the two third place swimmers advanced.

Semifinal 1

Place	Swimmer	Time	Qual.
1	George Hodgson (CAN)	5:25.4	QF WR
2	John Hatfield (GBR)	5:25.6	QF
3	William Foster (GBR)	5:49.0	
4	Nicholas Nerich (USA)	5:51.0	
5	Thomas Battersby (GBR)	5:51.2	
6	John Johnsen (NOR)		
—	Max Ritter (GER)	DNS	

Semifinal 2

Place	Swimmer	Time	Qual.
1	Harold Hardwick (ANZ)	5:31.0	QF
2	Béla Las-Torres (HUN)	5:34.8	QF
3	Cecil Healy (ANZ)	5:37.8	qf
4	Malcolm Champion (ANZ)	5:38.0	
5	Henry Taylor (GBR)	5:48.2	
—	Alajos Kenyery (HUN)	DNS	

=== Final ===
Place	Swimmer	Time
1	George Hodgson (CAN)	5:24.4 WR
2	John Hatfield (GBR)	5:25.8
3	Harold Hardwick (ANZ)	5:31.2
4	Cecil Healy (ANZ)	5:37.8
5	Béla Las-Torres (HUN)	5:42.0

== Notes ==
- Bergvall, Erik, ed. (1913). The Official Report of the Olympic Games of Stockholm 1912. Translated by Adams-Ray, Edward. Stockholm: Wahlström & Widstrand.
- Wudarski, Pawel (1999). "Wyniki Igrzysk Olimpijskich" (in Polish).
