= Béla Las-Torres =

Hungarian swimmer (1890–1915)

Personal information
- Born: April 20, 1890 Budapest, Kingdom of Hungary
- Died: October 12, 1915 (aged 25) Castelnuovo di Cattaro, (Note: The town, now in Montenegro, has through its history been called both Castelnuovo and Herceg Novi, in some time periods the names were used simultaneously. It has been variously under the control of the Republic of Venice, the Kingdom of Montenegro, Austria-Hungary and Fascist Italy.) Kingdom of Dalmatia

Sport
- Sport: Swimming
Medal record
Representing Hungary
Olympic Games
Silver medal – second place	1908 London	4x200m Freestyle

Béla Las-Torres (20 April 1890 – 12 October 1915) was a Hungarian freestyle swimmer who competed at the 1908 Summer Olympics and 1912 Summer Olympics.

At the 1908 Olympics, he won a silver medal as a member of a Hungarian 4x200 metre freestyle relay team. He also competed in the 400 metre freestyle event, reaching the semifinals. Four years later, he was fifth in the 400 metre freestyle competition, did not finish in 1500 metre freestyle final, and was a member of Hungarian freestyle relay team that won the silver medal in the 4x200 metre freestyle relay event. He was killed in action during World War I.

== See also ==
- List of Olympians killed in World War I
- World record progression 400 metres freestyle

== Notes ==
Records
Preceded by Alajos Kenyery	Men's 400 metre freestyle world record holder (long course); 05 June 1912 – 14 July 1912	Succeeded by George Hodgson
