= Otto Fahr =

German swimmer (1892–1969)

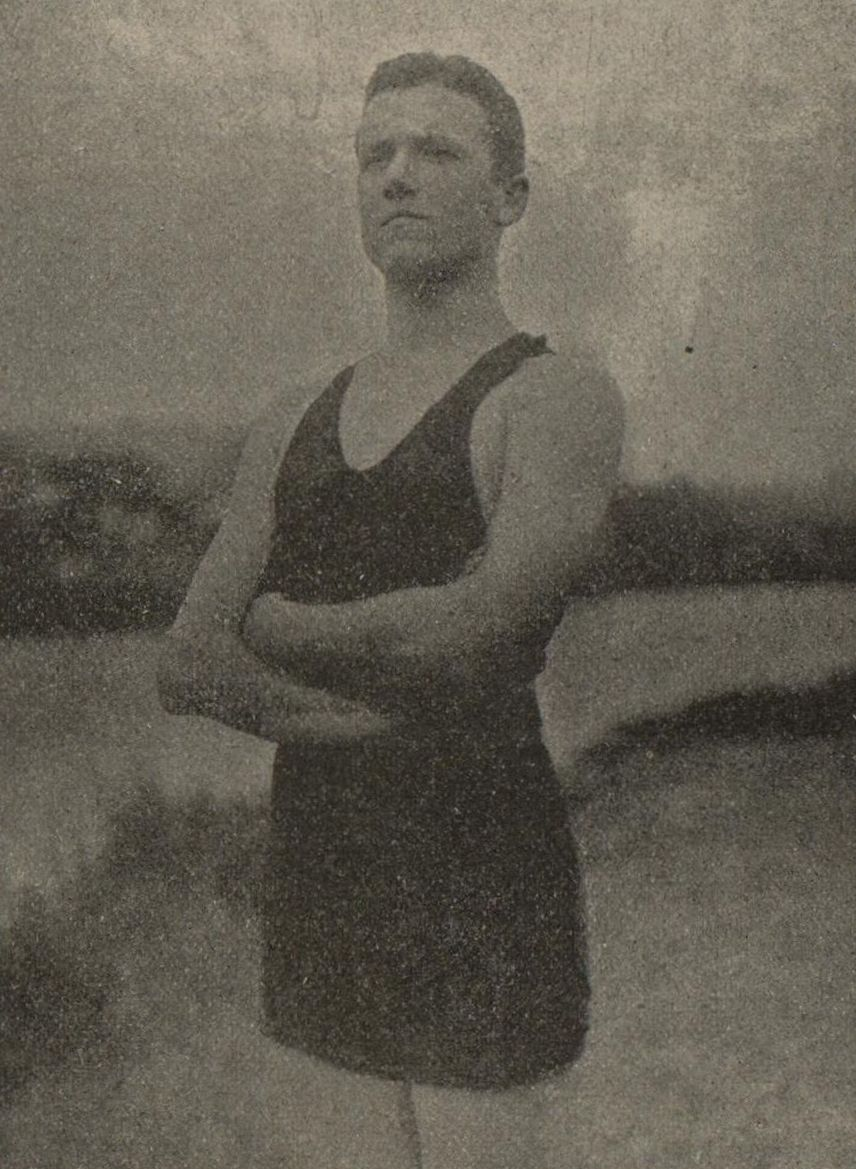
- Otto Fahr in 1909

Personal information
- Born: August 19, 1892 Bad Cannstatt, German Empire
- Died: February 28, 1969 (aged 76) Bad Cannstatt, West Germany

Sport
- Sport: Swimming
Medal record
Representing Germany
Olympic Games
| Silver medal – second place | 1912 Stockholm | 100 m backstroke |

Otto Fahr (German pronunciation: [ˈɔtoː ˈfaːɐ̯]; 19 August 1892 – 28 February 1969) was a German backstroke swimmer, who competed in the 1912 Summer Olympics. He was born and died in Bad Cannstatt. Fahr participated in only one event and won the silver medal in the 100 metre backstroke competition.

Records
| Preceded by (Germany) Oscar Schiele | Men's 100 m backstroke World Record Holder; April 29, 1912 – August 22, 1920 | Succeeded by (United States) Warren Kealoha |
