= Alajos Kenyery =

Hungarian swimmer

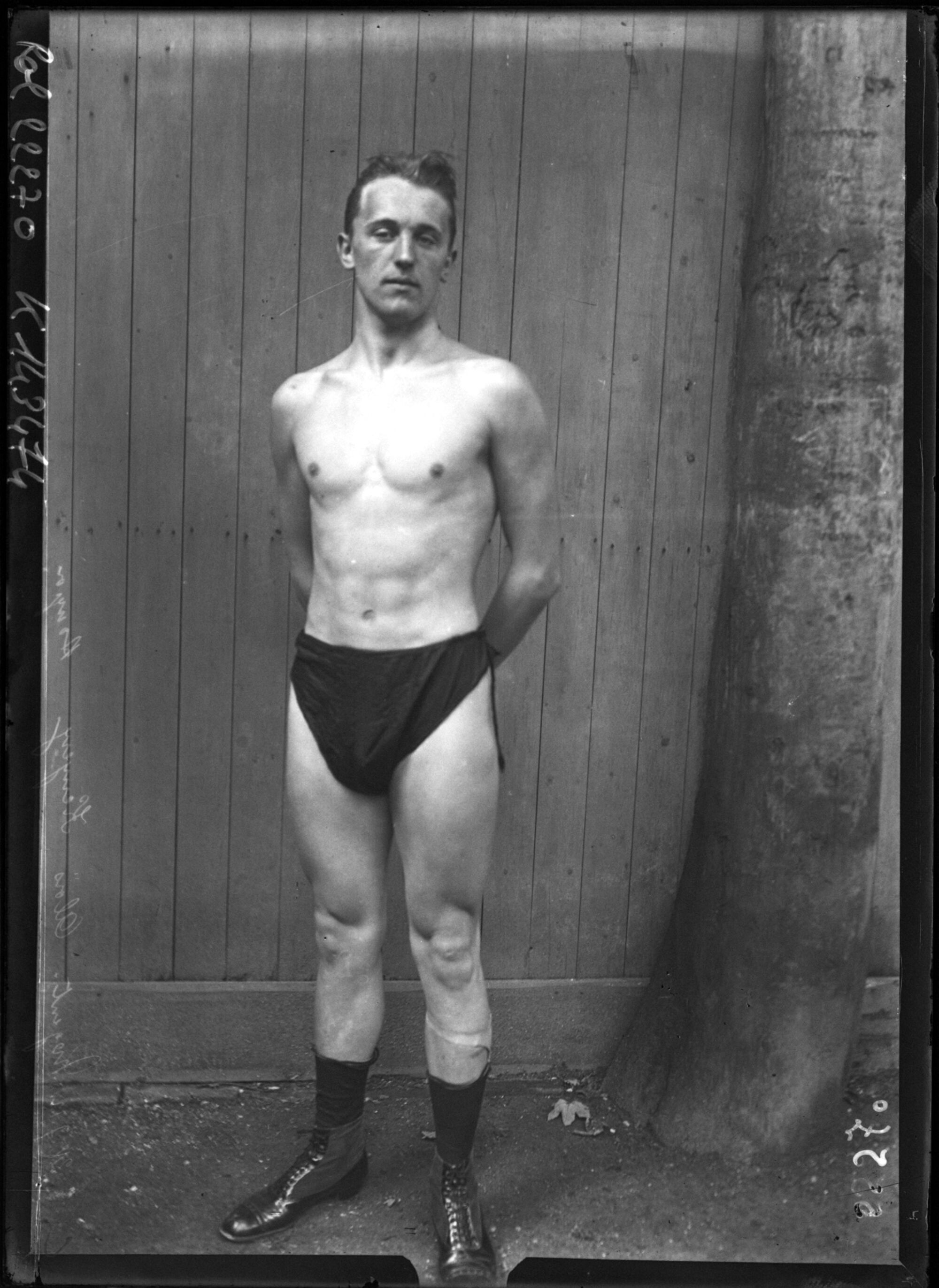

Personal information
- Full name: Kenyery Alajos Ferenc
- National team: Hungary
- Born: 13 May 1894 Budapest, Hungary
- Died: 9 November 1955 (aged 61) Milan, Italy

Sport
- Sport: Swimming
- Strokes: Freestyle
- Club: Muegyetemi Atlétikai és Futball Club

Alajos Ferenc Kenyery (later Kronberg, 13 May 1894 – 9 November 1955) was a Hungarian freestyle swimmer who competed in the 1912 Summer Olympics.

In 1912, he was eliminated in the first round of the 100 metre freestyle event. In the 400 metre freestyle competition, he qualified for the semi-finals but did not start in his heat. He was also a member of the Hungarian relay team, which didn't show up at the final of the 4x200 metre freestyle relay event.

== See also ==
- World record progression 400 metres freestyle

Records
Preceded by Thomas Battersby	Men's 400 metre freestyle world record holder (long course); 21 April 1912 – 5 June 1912	Succeeded by Béla Las-Torres
