= Swimming at the 1908 Summer Olympics – Men's 4 × 200 metre freestyle relay =

Men's 4 × 200 metre freestyle relay at the Games of the IV Olympiad
- Venue: White City Stadium
- Date: 24 July 1908
- Competitors: 24 from 6 nations
- Teams: 6
- Winning time: 10:55.6 WR

Medalists
1st place, gold medalist(s)		John Derbyshire, William Foster, Paul Radmilovic, Henry Taylor; Great Britain
2nd place, silver medalist(s)		Zoltán Halmay, Béla Las Torres, József Munk, Imre Zachár; Hungary
3rd place, bronze medalist(s)		Charles Daniels, Leo Goodwin, Harry Hebner, Leslie Rich; United States

The men's 4 × 200 metre freestyle relay, or 800 metre team race, was one of six swimming events on the Swimming at the 1908 Summer Olympics programme. It was the only relay event on the schedule, and the first appearance of the 4 × 200 in Olympic competition. Each nation could enter 1 team of 4 swimmers.

== Results ==
=== Semifinals ===
The fastest team in each semifinal and the fastest losing team from across the semifinals advanced to the final.

==== Semifinal 1 ====
Place	Nation	Swimmers	Time
1	Australasia	Frank Beaurepaire; Frank Springfield; Reginald Baker; Theodore Tartakover	11:35.0
2	Denmark	Poul Holm; Harald Klem; Ludvig Dam; Hjalmar Saxtorph	12:53.0

==== Semifinal 2 ====
Place	Nation	Swimmers	Time
1	Great Britain	William Foster; Paul Radmilovic; John Derbyshire; Henry Taylor	10:53.4 WR
2	United States	Harry Hebner; Leo Goodwin; Charles Daniels; Leslie Rich	11:01.4
3	Sweden	Gustaf Wretman; Gunnar Wennerström; Harald Julin; Adolf Andersson	Unknown

==== Semifinal 3 ====
Hungary had no competition in the third semifinal.

Place	Nation	Swimmers	Time
1	Hungary	József Munk; Imre Zachár; Béla Las Torres; Zoltán Halmay	Swam over

=== Final ===
Hungary led throughout the race until Halmay veered towards the wall and was caught by Taylor (who had only just before passed Rich) in the final 20 yards. Halmay struggled to the finish line, and was hauled out of the pool before he drowned.

Place	Nation	Swimmers	Time
1	Great Britain	John Derbyshire; Paul Radmilovic; William Foster; Henry Taylor	10:55.6
2	Hungary	József Munk; Imre Zachár; Béla las Torres; Zoltán Halmay	10:59.0
3	United States	Harry Hebner; Leo Goodwin; Charles Daniels; Leslie Rich	11:02.8
4	Australasia	Frank Beaurepaire; Frank Springfield; Reginald Baker; Theodore Tartakover	Unknown

== Sources ==
- Cook, Theodore Andrea (1908). The Fourth Olympiad, Being the Official Report. London: British Olympic Association.
- De Wael, Herman (2001). "Swimming 1908". Herman's Full Olympians.
