= Swimming at the 1912 Summer Olympics – Men's 1500 metre freestyle =

Men's 1500 metre freestyle at the Games of the V Olympiad
- Venue: Djurgårdsbrunnsviken
- Dates: July 6–10
- Competitors: 19 from 11 nations

Medalists
1st place, gold medalist(s)		George Hodgson	Canada
2nd place, silver medalist(s)		John Hatfield	Great Britain
3rd place, bronze medalist(s)		Harold Hardwick	Australasia

The men's 1500 metre freestyle was a swimming event held as part of the swimming at the 1912 Summer Olympics programme. It was the second appearance of the event, which had been introduced in 1908. At the 1904 and 1906 Olympics a one-mile freestyle contest was held. The competition was held from Saturday July 6, 1912 to Wednesday July 10, 1912.

Nineteen swimmers from eleven nations competed. The winning margin was 39.0 seconds which as of 2023 remains the only time this event was won by more than 35 seconds at the Olympics.

== Records ==
These were the standing world and Olympic records (in minutes) prior to the 1912 Summer Olympics.

World record	22:48.4	(United Kingdom) Henry Taylor	London (GBR)	July 25, 1908
Olympic record	22:48.4	(United Kingdom) Henry Taylor	London (GBR)	July 25, 1908

George Hodgson set a new world record with a 22:23.0 in the qualifying round and improved his own record in the final to 22:00.0.

== Results ==
=== Quarterfinals ===
The top two in each heat advanced along with the fastest loser overall.

==== Quarterfinal 1 ====
Place	Swimmer	Time	Qual.
1	Vilhelm Andersson (SWE)	23:12.2	QS
2	Malcolm Champion (ANZ)	23:34.0	QS
3	Henry Taylor (GBR)	24:06.4	qs
—	Herbert Wetter (NOR)	DNF	

==== Quarterfinal 2 ====
Place	Swimmer	Time	Qual.
1	Béla Las-Torres (HUN)	22:58.0	QS
2	Jack Hatfield (GBR)	23:16.6	QS
—	André Caby (FRA)	DNF	

==== Quarterfinal 3 ====
Place	Swimmer	Time	Qual.
1	George Hodgson (CAN)	22:23.0	QS WR
2	William Longworth (ANZ)	23:03.6	QS
3	Harry Hedegaard (DEN)	28:32.4	

==== Quarterfinal 4 ====
Place	Swimmer	Time	Qual.
1	Thomas Battersby (GBR)	23:58.0	QS
2	Franz Schuh (AUT)	25:19.8	QS
3	Eskil Wedholm (SWE)	27:38.0	
—	Mario Massa (ITA)	DNF	

==== Quarterfinal 5 ====
Place	Swimmer	Time	Qual.
1	Harold Hardwick (ANZ)	23:23.2	QS
2	William Foster (GBR)	23:52.2	QS
3	John Johnsen (NOR)	25:45.6	
4	Gustav Collin (SWE)	27:05.2	
—	Pavel Avksentyev (RU1)	DNF	

=== Semifinals ===
The top two from each heat and the faster of the two third place swimmers advanced.

Semifinal 1

Place	Swimmer	Time	Qual.
1	George Hodgson (CAN)	22:26.0	QF
2	Jack Hatfield (GBR)	22:33.4	QF
3	Harold Hardwick (ANZ)	23:14.0	qf
4	Vilhelm Andersson (SWE)	23:14.4	
—	Henry Taylor (GBR)	DNF	
—	Franz Schuh (AUT)	DNS	

Semifinal 2

Place	Swimmer	Time	Qual.
1	Béla Las-Torres (HUN)	23:09.8	QF
2	Malcolm Champion (ANZ)	23:24.2	QF
3	William Foster (GBR)	23:32.2	
4	Thomas Battersby (GBR)		
—	William Longworth (ANZ)	DNS	

=== Final ===
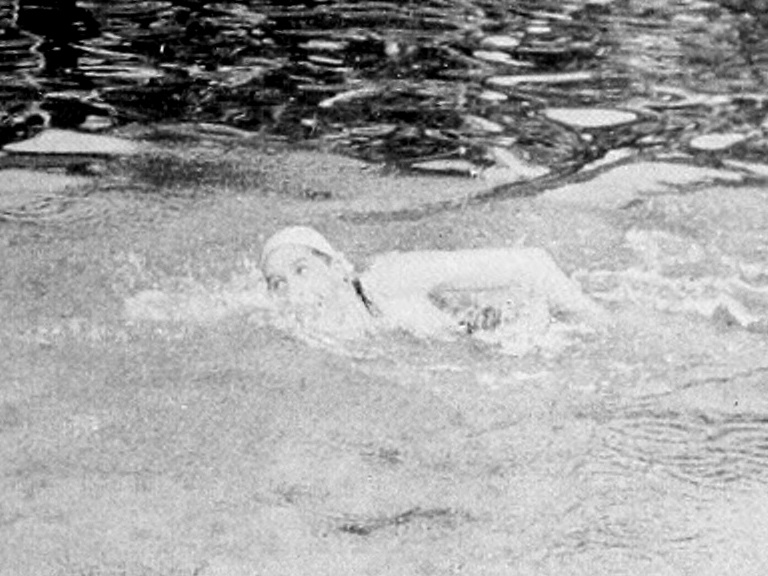
George Hodgson on the way to winning the gold medal.

Place	Swimmer	Time
1	George Hodgson (CAN)	22:00.0 WR
2	Jack Hatfield (GBR)	22:39.0
3	Harold Hardwick (ANZ)	23:15.4
-	Malcolm Champion (ANZ)	DNF
-	Béla Las-Torres (HUN)	DNF

== Notes ==
- Bergvall, Erik, ed. (1913). The Official Report of the Olympic Games of Stockholm 1912. Translated by Adams-Ray, Edward. Stockholm: Wahlström & Widstrand.
- Wudarski, Pawel (1999). "Wyniki Igrzysk Olimpijskich" (in Polish).
