= Swimming at the 1908 Summer Olympics – Men's 1500 metre freestyle =

Men's 1500 metre freestyle at the Games of the IV Olympiad
- Venue: White City Stadium
- Dates: July 21–25
- Competitors: 19 from 8 nations

Medalists
1st place, gold medalist(s)		Henry Taylor	Great Britain
2nd place, silver medalist(s)		Thomas Battersby	Great Britain
3rd place, bronze medalist(s)		Frank Beaurepaire	Australasia

The men's 1500 metre freestyle was one of 6 swimming events on the swimming at the 1908 Summer Olympics programme. Its distance was the longest of the 3 individual freestyle event distances. The competition was held from Tuesday July 21, 1908, to Saturday July 25, 1908.

Each nation could enter up to 12 swimmers. Nineteen swimmers from eight nations competed.

== Records ==
These were the standing world and Olympic records (in minutes) prior to the 1908 Summer Olympics.

World record	?	?		
Olympic record	27:18.2(*)	(Germany) Emil Rausch	St. Louis (USA)	September 6, 1904

(*) one mile (1609.34 m)

In the final Henry Taylor set the first official world record for this distance in 22:48.4.

== Competition format ==
With a much larger field than in 1904, the 1908 competition expanded to three rounds: heats, semifinals, and a final. The 1908 Games also restored the wild-card system from 1900, allowing the fastest swimmers who did not win their heat to advance. The seven heats consisted of between 1 and 4 swimmers, with the winner of the heat advancing along with the fastest loser from across the heats (all tied swimmers advanced in the case of equal times). There were two semifinals of 4 swimmers each; the top 2 finishers in each semifinal (regardless of overall time) advanced to the 4-person final.

Each race involved 15 lengths of the 100 metre pool. Any stroke could be used.

== Results ==
=== First round ===
Tuesday July 21, 1908: The fastest swimmer in each heat and the fastest loser advanced, qualifying eight swimmers for the semifinals.

==== Heat 1 ====
Place	Swimmer	Time	Qual.
1	Paul Radmilovic (GBR)	25:02.4	QS OR
2	Gunnar Wennerström (SWE)	27:15.4	
3	Oreste Muzzi (ITA)	28:52.6	

==== Heat 2 ====
Place	Swimmer	Time	Qual.
1	Frank Beaurepaire (ANZ)	23:45.8	QS OR
2	Sam Blatherwick (GBR)	25:15.4	
3	Piet Ooms (NED)	27:24.4	
4	Vilhelm Andersson (SWE)	27:34.4	

==== Heat 3 ====
Moist had no competition in the third heat.

Place	Swimmer	Time	Qual.
1	Lewis Moist (GBR)	26:52.0	QS

==== Heat 4 ====
Place	Swimmer	Time	Qual.
1	Thomas Battersby (GBR)	23:42.8	QS OR
2	Frank Springfield (ANZ)	24:52.4	
3	André Theuriet (FRA)	32:37.0	

==== Heat 5 ====
Place	Swimmer	Time	Qual.
1	John Jarvis (GBR)	25:51.6	QS
2	James Greene (USA)	28:09.0	
3	Robert Hassell (GBR)	28:14.8	

==== Heat 6 ====
Place	Swimmer	Time	Qual.
1	Henry Taylor (GBR)	23:24.4	QS OR
2	Otto Scheff (AUT)	24:15.8	qs
3	Gustaf Wretman (SWE)	28:40.8	
—	Eduard Meijer (NED)	DNF	

==== Heat 7 ====
Foster had no competition in the seventh heat.

Place	Swimmer	Time	Qual.
1	William Foster (GBR)	24:33.0	QS

=== Semifinals ===
Thursday July 23, 1908: The fastest two swimmers from each semifinal advanced to the final.

Semifinal 1

Place	Swimmer	Time	Qual.
1	Henry Taylor (GBR)	22:54.0	QF OR
2	Frank Beaurepaire (ANZ)	23:25.4	QF
3	William Foster (GBR)	Unknown	
4	Lewis Moist (GBR)	Unknown	

Semifinal 2

Place	Swimmer	Time	Qual.
1	Thomas Battersby (GBR)	23:23.0	QF
2	Otto Scheff (AUT)	24:25.0	QF
—	John Jarvis (GBR)	DNF	
—	Paul Radmilovic (GBR)	DNF	

=== Final ===
The final was held on Saturday July 25, 1908.

While Taylor stopped after the finish, Battersby swam an extra 109.344 metres after the finish to complete the mile. His time for the mile was 24:33.0, breaking the standing record of 24:42.6 set by David Billington in 1905.

Place	Swimmer	Time
1	Henry Taylor (GBR)	22:48.4 WR
2	Thomas Battersby (GBR)	22:51.2
3	Frank Beaurepaire (ANZ)	22:56.2
4	Otto Scheff (AUT)	Unknown

== Sources ==
- Cook, Theodore Andrea (1908). The Fourth Olympiad, Being the Official Report. London: British Olympic Association.
- De Wael, Herman (2001). "Swimming 1908". Herman's Full Olympians.
