= James Reilly (swimmer) =

American swimmer

Jim Reilly
Personal information
- Full name: James Herbert Reilly
- Born: March 11, 1890 New York, New York, U.S.
- Died: March 3, 1962 (aged 71) Auburn, New York, U.S.

Sport
- Sport: Swimming

James Herbert Reilly (March 11, 1890 – March 3, 1962) was an American swimmer and coach. He competed in two events at the 1912 Summer Olympics before becoming the swimming coach at Rutgers University for over 40 years.

Reilly attended Townsend Harris Hall High School, where he was named the captain of the swim team for his senior year. In 1910, Reilly was the national mile free-style swimming champion, and was also a member on the national champion indoor 400-yard free-style relay team of the New York Athletic Club in 1910 and 1911.

At the 1912 Summer Olympics, Reilly competed for the United States in both the 100 metre freestyle and 400 metre freestyle, but failed to advance from the first round in either event. Reilly was also scheduled to compete in the 1500 metre freestyle, but did not start in the event.

In 1915, Reilly was hired by Rutgers University to be the first head coach for the swimming program at the school. Reilly would remain at the school for the next 41 years, coaching future Olympians such as Walter Spence and George Kojac. While at Rutgers, Reilly's teams had a record of 227-83 in dual meets. Reilly was also a professor while at the school.

Following his retirement in 1956, Reilly moved to Auburn, New York in order to live with his daughter. After a prolonged illness, Reilly died at Auburn Memorial Hospital in 1962, at the age of 71.

In 1997, Reilly was elected to the Rutgers Athletics Hall of Fame. In 2002, Reilly was elected into the American Swimming Coaches Association Hall of Fame.
