= Jack Hatfield =

British swimmer (1893–1965)

Personal information
- Full name: John Gatenby Hatfield
- National team: Great Britain
- Born: 15 August 1893 Stokesley, England
- Died: 30 March 1965 (aged 71) Middlesbrough, England

Sport
- Sport: Swimming
- Strokes: Freestyle, water polo
- Club: Middlesbrough ASC
Medal record
Men's swimming
Representing Great Britain
Olympic Games
| Silver medal – second place | 1912 Stockholm | 400 m freestyle |
| Silver medal – second place | 1912 Stockholm | 1500 m freestyle |
| Bronze medal – third place | 1912 Stockholm | 4×200 m freestyle |

John Gatenby Hatfield (15 August 1893 – 30 March 1965) was an English competitive swimmer and water polo player who represented Great Britain internationally. Hatfield won three medals at the 1912 Summer Olympics in Stockholm, Sweden, and competed in three other Olympic Games.

Born in the town of Stokesley, North Yorkshire, he went on to found a sporting goods store in Middlesbrough, which remained open until August 2018. The store sponsored local sports, including a football league. In recognition of this and other contributions to the community, Hatfield's son was awarded the Freedom of the Borough of Middlesbrough in 2009.

Hatfield served in the British Expeditionary Force in World War I.

== Swimming career ==
=== Early life ===
Jack Hatfield was born in Stokesley, North Yorkshire, in 1893. He started swimming at age five, and by the age of 12, he had won his first title – Senior Champion of Middlesbrough. At 16, he won the Yorkshire Quarter Mile, knocking 11 seconds off the previous best time.

His father was the superintendent of Middlesbrough Baths, where James Hatfield did most of his training. He was also known to train in the River Tees, Smith's Dock, a flooded quarry in Great Ayton, and the boating lake in Albert Park. At the height of his fame, it was not uncommon for crowds of two to three thousand people to come and watch him train.

=== 1912 Olympics ===
In 1912, Hatfield was chosen for the Stockholm Olympic Games. In each of the 400 and 1500 metre freestyle events, including the preliminaries, he broke the world record – only to see his victory snatched away from him by Canada's George Hodgson, who won gold in both events.

Hatfield returned home with two silver medals and a bronze (won in the freestyle relay race) to a hero's welcome. He was greeted at Darlington Railway Station by a crowd of 20,000 people whilst a band played "Hail the Conquering Hero". No other male British swimmer succeeded in winning an individual Olympic medal until the 1964 Olympics in Tokyo, when Bobby McGregor won the silver.

In the two years following the 1912 Olympics, Hatfield won ten English Championships and broke five world records with the then-revolutionary Trudgen crawl (a variety of front crawl).

=== World War I ===
The outbreak of World War I meant that all championships were suspended for seven years, including the 1916 Olympics. Hatfield became a gunner in the Royal Artillery and spent four years in the trenches in France, only to be brought back for the Army Navy Championship, which he won in 1915.

=== Post-war career ===
After the war, his swimming career continued, and he took part in three further Olympic Games: Antwerp in 1920, Paris in 1924, and Amsterdam in 1928. He also took part in the European Games in Budapest in 1929 and was asked to captain the English team in the 1930 British Empire Games at the age of 37. He finished fourth in the 1500 metres freestyle final.

Hatfield led Middlesbrough's water polo team to victory, and as England's centre forward, he played against every European country between 1920 and 1932. His swimming career spanned two decades, during which time he won every title from the 300 yards to the five-mile Championships held in the River Thames - 42 titles in total. He broke more local, national, international, and world records in swimming than any other man until the arrival of Johnny Weissmuller.

== Jack Hatfield Sports ==
As well as his swimming credits, Hatfield was a keen all-round sportsman and a respected local businessman. Following the 1912 Olympics, his father set him up as the proprietor of a sports shop – Jack Hatfield Sports – on Newton Street in Middlesbrough. The "Jack Hatfield Swimming Costume" (the first costume for men to be made without sleeves and legs) found an international market and made his 12 ft by 13 ft shop known to many of the big names in the swimming world.

The shop soon grew to take in two neighbouring shops before it moved premises to Borough Road when Newton Street was redeveloped. It was a family-run business – Jack Hatfield's sister ran the shop whilst he was away, and following his death in 1965, three of his four sons took over the ownership of the shop, having worked there all their adult lives.

The shop had a reputation for outstanding personal service with the approach of service before profit. Hatfield ensured that he always had a large amount of stock that covered the needs of almost every athletic sport, and he could offer sound and expert advice in any of these areas.

They offered a service whereby they would blow up customers' footballs for them, and every weekend, the shelves would overflow with footballs waiting to be inflated. Sometimes the queues would be so long that other customers were unable to gain access to the shop.

The shop's 50th, 75th, and 85th anniversaries were celebrated, as well as the retirement of Hatfield's sons from the firm. A tribute in the Evening Gazette was published, which read: "It's sad to see the end of an era as the name Hatfield meant a lot to people in this part of the country, so good luck and good health to the family, you served your town well."

One of Middlesbrough's longest-running businesses, the shop remained open until August 2018.

=== Middlesbrough Football Club ===
Hatfield was closely connected with Middlesbrough Football Club all his life, and as a result, the shop supplied the club with all their sporting equipment. Jack Hatfield's was visited by scores of professional and amateur footballers over the years, and Hatfield counted the likes of Matt Busby and Brian Clough as personal friends. Hatfield was made one of the eight Directors of Middlesbrough Football Club in 1952. As well as bringing many top-name players to Middlesbrough, he also played an instrumental part in bringing three FIFA World Cup games to Ayresome Park in 1966, even though they were played a year after his death.

== Death and legacy ==
Hatfield died at the age of 71. In his obituaries, he was remembered as "possibly the most popular man on Teesside".

Hatfield was inducted into the International Swimming Hall of Fame in 1984. His achievements have also been honoured on a local level – Jack Hatfield Square was opened on Fry Street in Middlesbrough 15 years after his death. In attendance were the town's civic dignitaries and other guests. A service of dedication was held, accompanied by the Middlesbrough Sea Cadet Corps on pipes and drums. In 1999, a special plaque in commemoration was unveiled in Captain Cook's Square at the site of the former Middlesbrough Swimming Baths.

An exhibition was held at the Dorman Museum in Middlesbrough to mark the 100th anniversary of Hatfield's birth, which included the display of the "Illuminated Address" given to Hatfield by the people of Middlesbrough in 1924 in recognition of his swimming achievements. His medals were also displayed in a fundraising exhibition at the Marton Country Club Hotel to raise money for the Olympic Appeal Fund.

Jack Hatfield's eldest of four sons, also called Jack, was awarded the Freedom of the Borough of Middlesbrough in 2009.

== See also ==
- List of members of the International Swimming Hall of Fame
- List of Olympic medalists in swimming (men)
- World record progression 400 metres freestyle
