= Bartholomeus Roodenburch =

Dutch swimmer

Personal information
- Full name: Bartholomeus Adrianus Roodenburch
- National team: Netherlands
- Born: 29 June 1866 Amsterdam, the Netherlands.
- Died: 16 July 1939 (aged 73) Oegstgeest, the Netherlands.

Sport
- Sport: Swimming
- Strokes: Backstroke

Bartholomeus Roodenburch (29 June 1866 – 16 July 1939) was a Dutch backstroke swimmer who competed in the 1908 Summer Olympics in London.

Roodenburch was born in Amsterdam. Aged 42, he participated in the 100 meter backstroke competition of the 1908 Olympics, but he was eliminated in the first round, finishing 13th with a time of 1:36.2. He died in Oegstgeest.
