= Eric Seward =

British swimmer

Personal information
- Born: 6 July 1891 Melbourne, Victoria (AUS)
- Died: 11 October 1975 (aged 84)

Sport
- Sport: Swimming

Eric Seward (6 July 1891 – 11 October 1975) was a British swimmer. He competed in the men's 100 metre backstroke event at the 1908 Summer Olympics.

Seward was later a pilot with No 14 Squadron in the Royal Flying Corps in Palestine from 1916–1918. In 1917, the Martinsyde G.100 he was flying was brought down by Turkish anti-aircraft fire. Seward swam four miles under enemy fire to an outpost of the Wellington Mounted Rifles Regiment, ANZAC. He was subsequently awarded the Military Cross. This was memorialized in a painting, The Seward Exploit, and is in the collection of the Imperial War Museum, RAF Section.

After retiring from the RAF, he had a business career.
