= Amilcare Beretta =

Italian swimmer

Personal information
- Born: 10 December 1885 Milan, Italy
- Died: 12 November 1959 (aged 73)

Sport
- Sport: Swimming

Amilcare Beretta (10 December 1885 – 12 November 1959) was an Italian swimmer. He competed in two events at the 1908 Summer Olympics and the water polo tournament at the 1920 Summer Olympics. He won Italian national championships in swimming, water polo and boxing.
