= Hugo Lundevall =

Swedish swimmer

Personal information
- Full name: Knut Hugo Valfrid Lundevall
- Born: 7 December 1892 Estuna, Sweden
- Died: 16 January 1949 (aged 56) Stockholm, Sweden

Sport
- Sport: Swimming

Knut Hugo Valfrid Lundevall (7 December 1892 – 16 January 1949) was a Swedish swimmer. He competed in the men's 100 metre backstroke event at the 1912 Summer Olympics.

Born in Estuna, Norrtälje, Lundevall represented SK Neptun.
