= András Baronyi =

Hungarian sportsman

Personal information
- Full name: Baronyi András
- Nationality: Hungarian
- Born: 13 September 1892 Budapest
- Died: 6 June 1944 (aged 51) Budapest

Sport
- Sport: Swimming
- Strokes: Breaststroke and Backstroke
- Club: Magyar Atlétikai Club

András Baronyi (13 September 1892 – 6 June 1944) was a Hungarian swimmer and track and field athlete who competed in the 1908 Summer Olympics and in the 1912 Summer Olympics. He was born and died in Budapest.

In 1908, he was eliminated in the first round of the 200 metre breaststroke event. Four years later, at the 1912 Olympics, he finished fourth in the 100 metre backstroke competition. At the same Olympics, he also finished seventh in the standing long jump contest.
