= Paul Kellner =

German swimmer

Personal information
- Born: June 6, 1890 Spandau, German Empire
- Died: April 3, 1972 (aged 81) West Berlin, West Germany

Sport
- Sport: Swimming
Medal record
Representing Germany
Olympic Games
Bronze medal – third place	1912 Stockholm	100 metre backstroke

Paul Kellner (June 6, 1890 – April 3, 1972) was a German backstroke swimmer, who competed in the 1912 Summer Olympics. He was born in Spandau and died in West Berlin. Kellner participated in only one event and won the bronze medal in the 100 metre backstroke competition.
