= Gunnar Wennerström =

Swedish water polo player

Personal information
- Born: 27 June 1879 Mellerud, Sweden
- Died: 2 June 1931 (aged 51) Stockholm, Sweden

Sport
- Sport: Swimming
Medal record
Representing Sweden
Olympic Games
Bronze medal – third place	1908 London	Team competition

Gunnar Erik Emanuel Wennerström (27 June 1879 – 2 June 1931) was a Swedish water polo player and freestyle swimmer who competed in the 1908 Summer Olympics.

He was part of the Swedish water polo team, which was able to win the bronze medal. In the 1500 metres freestyle event he was eliminated in the first round. Also he was part of the Swedish 4 x 200 metre freestyle relay team.

Wennerström represented Stockholms KK.

== See also ==
- Dual sport and multi-sport Olympians
- List of Olympic medalists in water polo (men)
