= János Wenk =

Hungarian water polo player

Personal information
- Born: April 24, 1894 Csaca, Kingdom of Hungary, Austria-Hungary
- Died: October 17, 1962 (aged 68) Budapest, Hungary

Sport
- Sport: Swimming

János Wenk (24 April 1894 - 17 October 1962) was a Hungarian water polo player and backstroke swimmer who competed in the 1912 Summer Olympics and in the 1924 Summer Olympics.

Born in Csaca, he was part of the Hungarian water polo team, which competed in the 1912 tournament and, twelve years later, in the 1924 tournament. At the 1928 tournament, he was a reserve player and did not compete in a match.

In 1912, he also competed in the 100 metre backstroke event, but he was eliminated in the first round.

He died in Budapest.

== See also ==
- Hungary men's Olympic water polo team records and statistics
- List of men's Olympic water polo tournament goalkeepers
