= Frank Sandon =

British swimmer and educator

Personal information
- Born: 3 June 1890 Islington, London, England
- Died: 29 May 1979 (aged 88)

Sport
- Sport: Swimming

Frank Sandon (3 June 1890 – 29 May 1979) was a British swimmer and educator. He competed in the men's 100 metre backstroke event at the 1912 Summer Olympics.

Sandon studied mathematics at Corpus Christi College, Cambridge, finishing as a Wrangler. He joined the Home office but found he was 'too remote from real people', so after the First World War became a schoolmaster. He taught at Highgate School from 1921 to 1923 and at various grammar schools, becoming headmaster of Plymouth Corporation Grammar School, founded in 1562, for eight years until its closure in 1937. A strong believer in co-education, in 1941, Sandon was appointed headmaster of Millom County Secondary School in Millom, Cumberland. He wrote or contributed to numerous books on statistics.
