= Sándor Kugler =

Hungarian swimmer

Personal information
- Nationality: Hungarian
- Born: 11 August 1879 Budapest, Austria-Hungary
- Died: 16 November 1964 (aged 85)

Sport
- Sport: Swimming

Sándor Kugler (11 August 1879 – 16 November 1964) was a Hungarian swimmer. He competed in the men's 100 metre backstroke event at the 1908 Summer Olympics.
