= Nils-Erik Haglund =

Swedish swimmer

Personal information
- Nationality: Swedish
- Born: 19 June 1893 Stockholm, Sweden
- Died: 19 March 1921 (aged 27) Glasgow, Scotland

Sport
- Sport: Swimming
- Club: Stockholms KK

Nils-Erik Haglund (19 June 1893 – 19 March 1921) was a Swedish swimmer. He competed in the men's 400 metre freestyle event at the 1912 Summer Olympics.

Haglund represented Stockholms KK.
