= John Johnsen (swimmer) =

Norwegian swimmer

Personal information
- Born: January 5, 1892 Oslo, Norway
- Died: August 24, 1984 (aged 92) Oslo, Norway

Sport
- Sport: Swimming

John Haakon Johnsen (January 5, 1892 – August 24, 1984) was a Norwegian freestyle and backstroke swimmer who competed in the 1912 Summer Olympics. He was born and died in Oslo, and his club was Oslo IL.

In the 1912 Olympic Games, he was eliminated in the semi-finals of the 400 metre freestyle event. He also participated in the 100 metre freestyle competition, in the 1500 metre freestyle event, and in the 100 metre backstroke competition but was eliminated in all three contests in the first round.
