= Frederick Unwin (swimmer) =

British swimmer

Fred Unwin
Personal information
- Full name: Frederick Unwin
- Born: 5 October 1889 Cold Norton, Essex, England
- Died: 28 May 1965 (aged 75) St. Pancras, London, England

Sport
- Sport: Swimming

Frederick Unwin (5 October 1889 – 28 May 1965) was a British swimmer. He competed in the men's 100 metre backstroke event at the 1908 Summer Olympics.
