= Otto Groß =

German swimmer

Personal information
- Born: January 12, 1890 Karlsruhe, German Empire
- Died: October 16, 1964 (aged 74) Karlsruhe, West Germany

Sport
- Sport: Swimming
- Strokes: Backstroke

Otto Groß (12 January 1890 – 16 October 1964) was a German backstroke swimmer who competed in the 1912 Summer Olympics. He was born in Karlsruhe. In 1912, he finished fifth in the 100 metre backstroke competition.
