= David Theander =

Swedish swimmer

Personal information
- Nationality: Swedish
- Born: 19 March 1892 Stockholm, Sweden
- Died: 18 July 1985 (aged 93) Odensbacken, Sweden

Sport
- Sport: Swimming
- Club: Stockholms KK

David Theander (19 March 1892 – 18 July 1985) was a Swedish swimmer. He competed in the men's 400 metre freestyle event at the 1912 Summer Olympics.

Theander represented Stockholms KK.
