= László Szentgróthy =

Hungarian swimmer

Personal information
- Born: 11 October 1891 Esztergom, Austria-Hungary

Sport
- Sport: Swimming

László Szentgróthy (born 11 October 1891, date of death unknown) was a Hungarian swimmer. He competed in two events at the 1912 Summer Olympics.
