= Gunnar Sundman =

Swedish swimmer

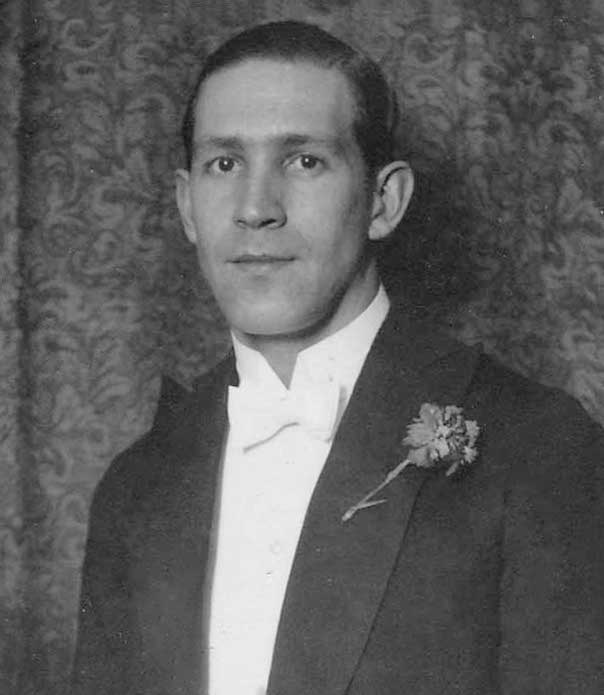

Personal information
- Full name: Gunnar Isidor Sundman
- Born: 15 April 1893 Stockholm, Sweden
- Died: 20 July 1946 (aged 53) Redding, California, United States

Sport
- Sport: Swimming
- Strokes: Backstroke
- Club: Stockholms KK

Gunnar Isidor Sundman (15 April 1893 – 20 July 1946) was a Swedish swimmer. He competed at the 1912 Summer Olympics in the 100 m backstroke event, but failed to reach the final.

Sundman later immigrated to the United States, where he continued to swim and worked as an engineer with the California Department of Transportation. He served in World War I.
