= Oskar Schiele =

German swimmer

Personal information
- Born: April 14, 1889 Halberstadt, German Empire
- Died: July 1, 1950 (aged 61) Magdeburg, West Germany

Sport
- Sport: Swimming
Medal record
Representing Germany
Intercalated Games
Silver medal – second place	1906 Athens	4x250 m freestyle relay

Oskar Schiele (April 14, 1889 – July 1, 1950) was a German freestyle and backstroke swimmer who competed in the 1906 Intercalated Games and in the 1912 Summer Olympics. He was born in Halberstadt and died in Magdeburg.

In 1906, he won a silver medal as a member of the German 4x250 m relay team. He also finished seventh in the one mile freestyle competition. Six years later, at the 1912 Olympics, he was eliminated in the first round of the 400 metre freestyle event as well as of the 100 metre backstroke competition. He was also a member of the German relay team, which finished fourth in the 4x200 metre freestyle relay event.
