= Ludvig Dam =

Danish swimmer

Personal information
- Born: March 24, 1884 Sjælland, Denmark
- Died: March 29, 1972 (aged 88) Odense, Denmark

Sport
- Sport: Swimming
Medal record
Representing Denmark
Olympic Games
Silver medal – second place	1908 London	100 m backstroke

Hans Peter Ludvig Dam (24 March 1884 – 29 March 1972) was a Danish freestyle and backstroke swimmer who competed in the 1906 Summer Olympics and 1908 Summer Olympics.

In the 1906 Olympics, he was sixth in his heat of 100 metre freestyle and did not advance.

In the 1908 Olympics, he won a silver medal in 100 metre backstroke. He was also a member of Danish 4x200 metre freestyle relay team, which placed second on its heat and did not advance.
