= Leslie Rich =

American swimmer

- Rich around age 23 in swimming jersey, circa 1910

Personal information
- Full name: Leslie George Rich Jr.
- National team: United States
- Born: December 29, 1886 Somerville, Massachusetts
- Died: October 1969 (aged 82) Dade City, Florida

Sport
- Sport: Swimming
- Events: 50, 100, 200, 400 freestyle Freestyle Relays
- Strokes: Freestyle
- Club: Brookline Swimming Club
Medal record
Men's swimming
Representing the United States
Olympic Games
Bronze medal – third place	1908 London	4x200 m freestyle

Leslie George Rich (December 29, 1886 – October 1969) was an American competition swimmer who represented the United States at the 1908 Summer Olympics in London, where he won a bronze medal swimming with the U.S. men's 4x200-meter freestyle relay team. He was later a supplemental selection for the 1912 Stockholm Olympics, and was scheduled to swim the 100 and 400-meter freestyle but did not compete. Rich attended Brookline High School and trained and competed for the Brookline Swimming Club. Prior to the 1908 Olympics, at a highly publicized swim match between Harvard and Yale at the Brookline Public Baths on March 11, Rich, as a Captain of the Brookline Swim Club, was scheduled to swim a 50-yard swim match with American Olympic Gold medalist and fellow 1908 Olympian Charles Daniels, but Daniels did not show for the event.

Leslie George Rich was born on December 29, 1886, in Somerville, Massachusetts, a Western Boston suburb, five miles North of Brookline, to George Sumner Rich and Edna Frances Holden Rich. Beginning in the early 1900s, Leslie's father George served as a Superintendent of the Brookline Public Baths, and was active with the Brookline Swim Club. The Brookline Club swam and trained at the Brookline Public Baths, one of the Boston area's earliest municipal pools, containing a 24 by 80 foot heated pool, where year round training could be provided. Leslie's sister Edna Mildred and brother Chester also competed for the Brookline Club. On March 10, 1900, Leslie was scheduled to swim in a relay race as a Junior for Brookline High School against Brookline's Pierce School. Rich began his swimming career with the Brookline Swimming Club, and represented the club during competition.

On June 11, 1901, after passing a variety of tests in swimming skills, Leslie Rich received a certificate from the Massachusetts Humane Society given at the Brookline Public Schools exhibition held at the Brookline Public Baths on Tappan Street. As part of the exhibition, Rich gave a demonstration of underwater swimming, and later received an additional diploma for demonstrating swimming proficiency from Dr. Walter Channing, Chairman of the Public Bath Committee.

== Brookline swim club races ==
On January 1, 1902, Rich placed second in the 200-yard handicap, and first in the suit and hat race, at a swimming carnival held at the Brookline Natatorium on Tappan Street. At the regular Brookline swimming club meet at the Brookline Public Baths on January 29, 1902, known first as a sprinter, Rich won the 50-yard handicap swim, the principle event, in a time of 34 seconds. He won the final of the 80-yard handicap swim in 59.6 seconds, in the regular meeting of the Brookline Swim Club in early February, 1902. His 59.6 second time was within a few seconds of the tank record.

Representing the Brookline Swimming Club before a crowd of thousands in late June, 1902, Rich placed third in the 50-yard scratch race, the first race of the day, held by the East Boston Athletic Association Boat Club. The race was held in open water in front of the East Boston Boat Club. In early July, 1906, again representing the Brookline Club, Rich placed second to James Ten Eyck of Syracuse in the 200-yard Championship scratch race at the South Barre Swimming Club Championships held at South Barre.

Noted for longer distance swimming in addition to sprint races, Rich was credited with swimming the 440-yard swim on March 9, 1904, in a record time of 6:03, around 5 seconds under the former record regional time of 6:08.

After improving his times in club standings, Rich was selected from several members of the Brookline Swimming Club to compete as a member of their Relay racing team in a dual meet against the New York Swimming Club in New York on February 5, 1905. Rich was selected with Herbert D. Holm, Daniel O'Neil, James B. Greene, and Richard O'Neil. At the time Rich was considered by member of the Boston sports media to be the fastest member of the Brookline team.

On August 19, 1905, Rich played water polo in the position of right forward representing the Magnolia Club against the Brookline Swim Club, in a losing 3-1 match at Crescent Beach in Gloucester, Massachusetts.

=== Match with Charles Daniels ===
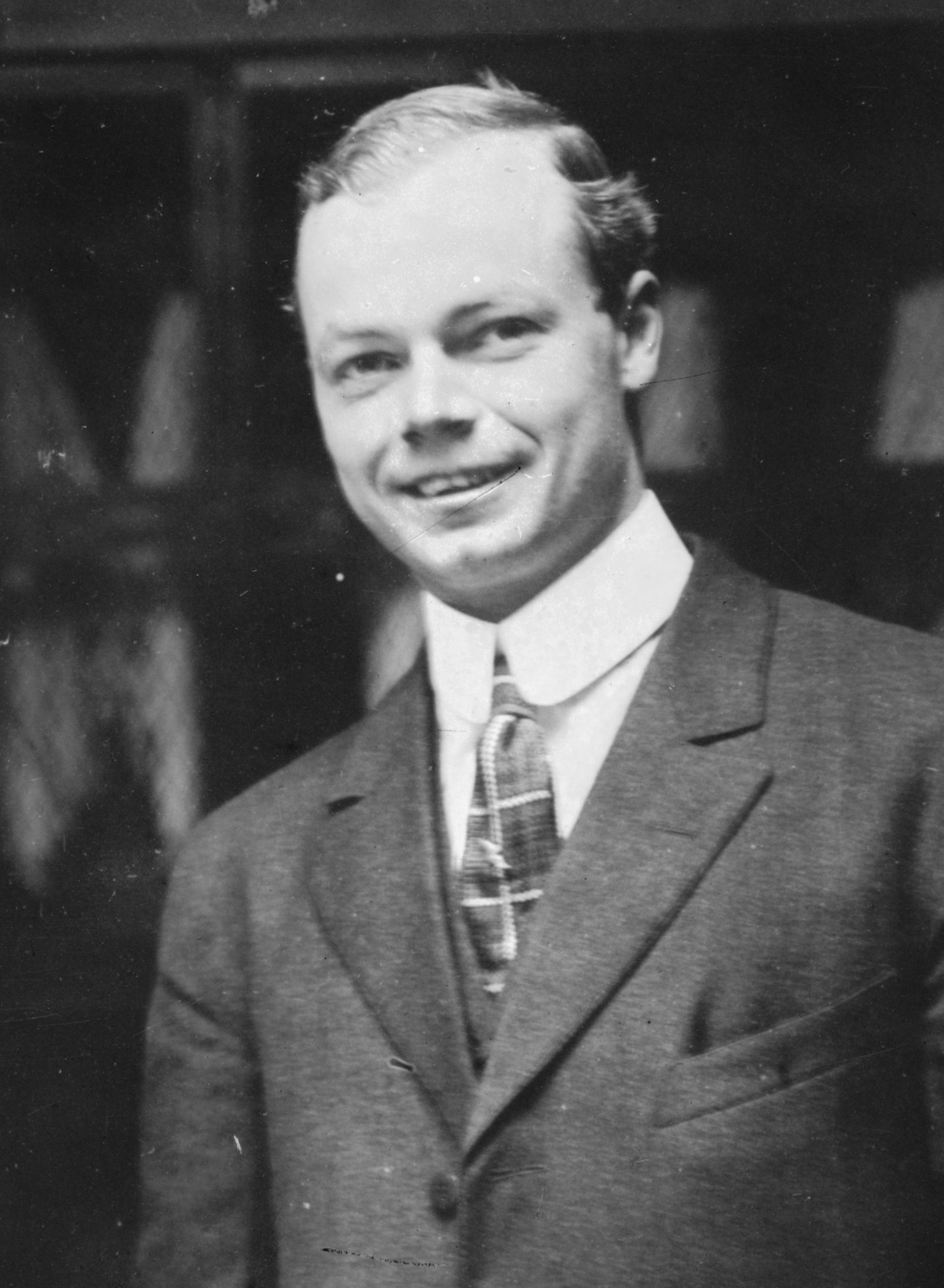
Olympic Champion Charles Daniels, 1907

On March 11, 1908, prior to the London Olympics, Rich, then acting as the Brookline Club's Captain, Rich was scheduled to swim a 50-yard race against Hall of Fame, four-time Olympic gold medalist Charles Daniels after a swim meet and water polo game between the Harvard and Yale Swim team at the Brookline Public Baths. After the Harvard-Yale match, two teams from Rich's Brookline Swim Club were scheduled for a swim meet and water polo match. Rich would perform his Monte Cristo dive after the competition between the Brookline teams. As swimming performances of the era included entertainment, the Monte Cristo was a high dive stunt executed with a feet-first landing that imitated the dive from the towering Château d'If prison into the water below by Edmond Dantes in the Count of Monte Cristo. It was sometimes performed escaping from a sack, or wearing prison clothes. Yale defeated Harvard in the swim match 33–20, though Yale won the water polo game 4–0. In a disappointing turn of events, Olympian Charles Daniels did not show up for his scheduled contest with Leslie Rich. By 1910, Rich was noted to have swum very close 50-yard freestyle matches against Daniels before sizable audiences.

== 1908 London Olympics ==
Rich won a bronze medal as a member of the third-place U.S. team in the mid-July 1908 Olympic men's 4×200-meter freestyle relay, that finished with a combined time of 11:02.8, together with teammates Harry Hebner, Leo Goodwin and Charles Daniels. Individually, he finished fourth overall in the men's 100-meter freestyle, with a time of 1:10.8 in heat 2 of the semi-final heats.

=== Kennebunk Swim Club exhibition ===
Just back from the 1908 Olympics, Rich judged the races and gave swimming demonstrations at the Kennebunk River Club Swimming exhibition in Kennebunkport, Maine on August 12, 1908. After the swimming competition, Rich and fellow Brookline Club swimmer Irvine Elliot demonstrated diving, swimming strokes, and swam a two-person 100-yard race, which was won by Rich. Rich later demonstrated his Monte Cristo dive.

== 1912 Stockholm Olympics ==
On June 11, 1912, after the U.S. Olympic trails in Verona Lakes, New Jersey, Rich was selected by the Olympic committee as part of a supplemental list of qualifiers for the 1912 Games in Stockholm. The members of the list each needed to raise $350 to attend. Rich was scheduled to swim the 100-meter and 400-meter freestyle, events in which he had formerly excelled, but did not participate.

Around 1923, Leslie was married to Rose Rich.

He died in October 1969, in Dade County, Florida and was buried in Laurel Hill Cemetery in Reading, Massachusetts, twenty miles North of Brookline.

== See also ==
- List of Olympic medalists in swimming (men)
