= Sydney Battersby =

British swimmer

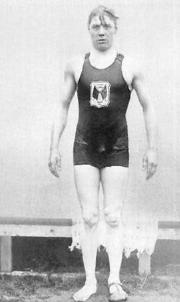
- Battersby in 1908

Personal information
- Full name: Thomas Sydney Battersby
- National team: Great Britain
- Born: 18 November 1887 Platt Bridge, Wigan, United Kingdom
- Died: 3 September 1974 (aged 86) Sydney, Australia

Sport
- Sport: Swimming
- Strokes: Freestyle
- Club: Wigan Swim Club
Medal record
Men's swimming
Representing Great Britain
Olympic Games
Silver medal – second place	1908 London	1500 m freestyle
Bronze medal – third place	1912 Stockholm	4×200 m freestyle

Thomas Sydney Battersby (18 November 1887 – 3 September 1974) was an English competition swimmer who represented Great Britain in freestyle events at two consecutive Olympic Games.

At the 1908 Summer Olympics hosted by London, he won a silver medal in the men's 1500-metre freestyle, finishing second with a time of 22:51.2, behind fellow Briton Henry Taylor (22:48.4), and ahead of Australian Frank Beaurepaire (22:56.2). He also advanced to the semi-finals in the 400-metre freestyle.

Four years later, at the 1912 Summer Olympics in Stockholm, Sweden, Battersby won a bronze medal as a member of the third-place British men's team in the 4×200-metre relay. He also reached the semi-finals of the 400-metre freestyle and 1500-metre freestyle.

During his competitive swimming career, Battersby set four world records in freestyle events, including the 400-metre, 330-yard, 440-yard and one-mile distances. Battersby had a reputation for physical toughness; at the 1908 Olympics, he continued to swim at the end of the 1500-metre event – a shorter distance than the imperial mile – in an attempt to break the world record for the mile freestyle. He fell short of breaking the world record but did set a new British national mark.

He was born in Platt Bridge, near Wigan, Lancashire, England. He died in Sydney, Australia. He was posthumously inducted into the International Swimming Hall of Fame as an "Honor Swimmer" in 2007.

== See also ==
- List of members of the International Swimming Hall of Fame
- List of Olympic medalists in swimming (men)
- World record progression 400 metres freestyle
