= József Munk =

Hungarian swimmer

Personal information
- Born: November 30, 1890 Budapest, Kingdom of Hungary
- Died: 1942 (aged 51–52)

Sport
- Sport: Swimming
Medal record
Representing Hungary
Olympic Games
Silver medal – second place	1908 London	4x200 m freestyle relay

József Munk (30 November 1890 – after 1942) was a Hungarian freestyle swimmer who competed at the 1908 Summer Olympics. He was Jewish, and in 1942 he fell into the hands of the Soviets. He was taken as a prisoner to the Soviet Union, from where he never returned.

At the 1908 Olympics he won a silver medal as a member of a Hungarian 4x200 metre freestyle relay team. He also competed in the 100 metre freestyle, but placed fourth in his heat and did not advance.

== See also ==
- List of select Jewish swimmers
