= William Foster (swimmer) =

English swimmer

Personal information
- Full name: William Foster
- National team: Great Britain
- Born: 10 July 1890 Haslingden, England
- Died: 17 December 1963 (aged 73) Fylde, England

Sport
- Sport: Swimming
- Strokes: Freestyle
- Club: Bacup Amateur Swimming Club
Medal record
Men's swimming
Representing Great Britain
Olympic Games
| Gold medal – first place | 1908 London | 4×200 m freestyle |
| Bronze medal – third place | 1912 Stockholm | 4×200 m freestyle |

William Foster (10 July 1890 – 17 December 1963) was an English competitive swimmer who represented Great Britain in the 1908 and 1912 Olympics. He was freestyle swimmer who won gold and bronze medals as a member of British relay teams and set a world record in the 4x200-metre freestyle relay.

At the 1908 Summer Olympics in London, he won the gold medal as part of the British 4×200-metre freestyle relay team and did not compete in any other competition. In the 400-metre freestyle final, he finished fourth, and in the 1500-metre freestyle event he was eliminated in the semi-finals.

Four years later, at the 1912 Summer Olympics in Stockholm, he won the bronze medal as part of the British 4×200-metre freestyle relay team. In the 400-metre freestyle competition as well as in the 1500-metre freestyle event, he was eliminated in the semi-finals.

== See also ==
- List of Olympic medalists in swimming (men)
- World record progression 4 × 200 metres freestyle relay
