= Imre Zachár =

Hungarian swimmer and water polo player

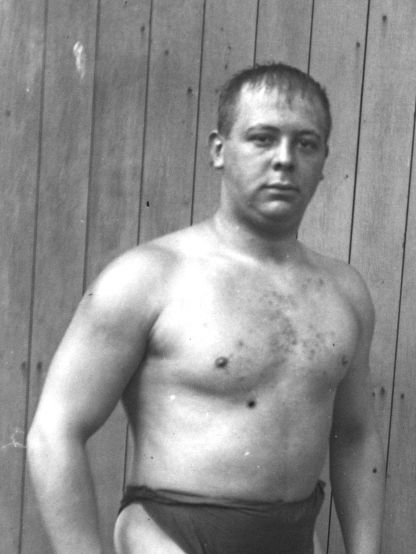
- Zachár in 1912

Personal information
- Born: May 11, 1890 Budapest, Austria-Hungary
- Died: April 7, 1954 (aged 63) Budapest, Hungary

Sport
- Sport: Swimming
Medal record
Representing Hungary
Olympic Games
Silver medal – second place	1908 London	4x200 m freestyle relay

Imre Zachár (11 May 1890 – 7 April 1954) was a Hungarian water polo player and freestyle swimmer who competed at the 1908 Summer Olympics and 1912 Summer Olympics.

== Swimming career ==
He was a member of the Hungarian 1908 Summer Olympics 4x200 metre freestyle relay team that received a silver medal, as well as a member of the Hungarian 4x200 metre freestyle relay team at the 1912 Summer Olympics, which qualified for the final, but did not compete. Zachár was also a member of the Hungarian water polo team which competed in the 1912 tournament.

== See also ==
- List of select Jewish swimmers
