= Herbert Haresnape =

British swimmer

Personal information
- Full name: Herbert Nickal Haresnape
- National team: Great Britain
- Born: 2 July 1880 Liverpool, England
- Died: 17 December 1962 (aged 82) Birkenhead, England
- Height: 5 ft 9 in (1.75 m)
- Weight: 128 lb (58 kg; 9.1 st)

Sport
- Sport: Swimming
- Strokes: Backstroke
- Club: Liverpool Swimming Club
Medal record
Men's swimming
Representing Great Britain
Olympic Games
Bronze medal – third place	1908 London	100 m backstroke

Herbert Nickal Haresnape (2 July 1880 – 17 December 1962) was an English competitive swimmer from West Derby, who represented Great Britain in two Olympic Games in the early 1900s.

At the 1908 Summer Olympics in London, he won a bronze medal in the men's 100-metre backstroke. Four years later at the 1912 Summer Olympics in Stockholm, he advanced to the semifinals in 100-metre backstroke.

== See also ==
- List of Olympic medalists in swimming (men)
