= Harry Hedegaard =

Danish swimmer

Personal information
- Born: 7 November 1894 Copenhagen, Denmark
- Died: 19 July 1939 (aged 44) Humlebæk, Denmark

Sport
- Sport: Swimming

Harry Hedegaard (7 November 1894 – 19 July 1939) was a Danish swimmer. At the age of 17, he competed for Denmark in the men's 400m freestyle and the men's 1,500m freestyle at the 1912 Summer Olympics.
