= Arno Bieberstein =

German swimmer

Personal information
- Born: 23 October 1883 Magdeburg, German Empire
- Died: 17 May 1918 (aged 34) Magdeburg, German Empire
Medal record
Men's swimming
Representing Germany
Olympic Games
Gold medal – first place	1908 London	100 m backstroke

Arno Bieberstein (23 October 1883 – 17 May 1918) was a German backstroke swimmer who competed in the 1908 Summer Olympics. He won a gold medal in the 100 metre backstroke event and did not compete in any other competition. In 1906 and 1907, he became German champion in backstroke as member of his homebased SC Hellas Magdeburg. He was born and died in Magdeburg.

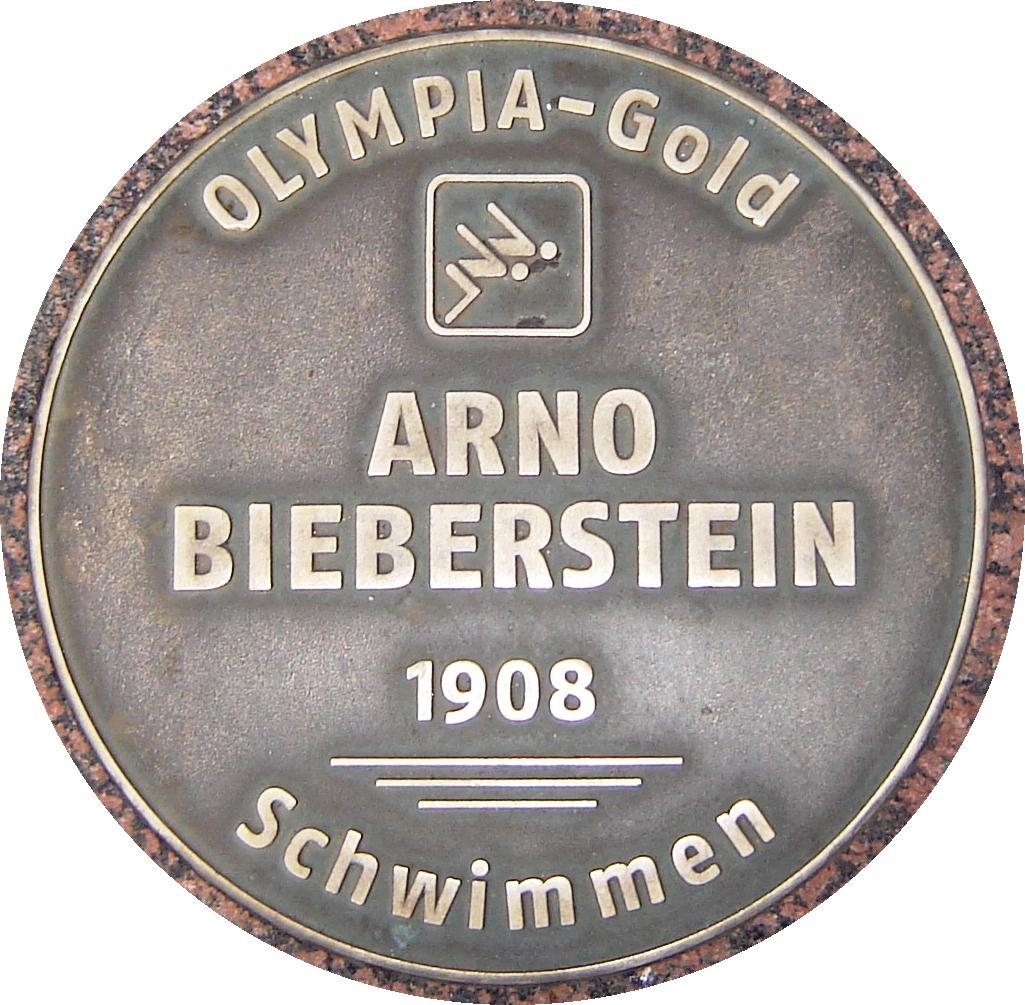
Bieberstein's 1908 Olympic Gold Medal
