= George Hodgson =

Canadian swimmer (1893–1983)

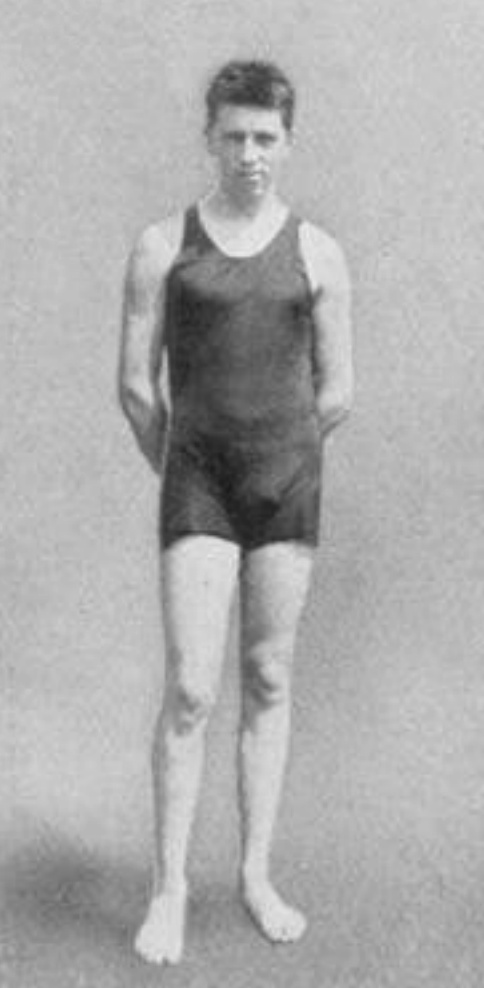
- Hodgson in 1912

Personal information
- Full name: George Ritchie Hodgson
- National team: Canada
- Born: October 12, 1893 Montreal, Quebec, Canada
- Died: May 1, 1983 (aged 89) Montreal, Quebec, Canada

Sport
- Sport: Swimming
- Strokes: Freestyle
- College team: McGill University
Medal record
Men's swimming
Representing Canada
Olympic Games
Gold medal – first place	1912 Stockholm	400 m freestyle
Gold medal – first place	1912 Stockholm	1500 m freestyle

George Ritchie Hodgson (October 12, 1893 – May 1, 1983) was a Canadian competition swimmer of the early 20th century, and considered by many to be the greatest swimmer in Canadian history. Hodgson won the two longer freestyle swimming gold medals at the 1912 Olympics, the only categories in which he competed. He also competed at the 1920 Summer Olympics.

== Personal life ==
George Hodgson was born in 1893 in Montreal, Quebec. He matriculated at McGill University in 1912, competing in swimming and water polo for the school. While there, he was admitted to the Zeta Psi fraternity and graduated with a Bachelor of Science in applied science in 1916. He was inducted into the Canada's Sports Hall of Fame in 1955, the International Swimming Hall of Fame in 1968, into the McGill University Sports Hall of Fame in 1996, and died in Montreal in 1983.

Several members of George Hodgson's extended family were also involved in Canadian sports. His uncles Billy and Archie Hodgson were prominent athletes with the Montreal Amateur Athletic Association in the 1880s and 1890s, playing both ice hockey and lacrosse with the organisation. Archie Hodgson was a member of the first Stanley Cup winning team in 1893, the same year George Hodgson was born.

== International career ==
George Hodgson, Canada's only Olympic gold medal winner in swimming until 1984, did not stay in competition very long. He won two gold medals at the 1912 Stockholm Olympics, with times of 5:24.4s in the 400-metre and 22:00.0s in the 1500-metre freestyle. He had already set a world record of 22:23.0 in the first round of the race. He was eighteen at the time and retired immediately after one of the greatest races of all time. His unprecedented success was widely attributed to his innovation of the trudgen stroke, a hybrid between the front crawl and sidestroke.

It was for the 1500 meter Olympic championship, and Hodgson broke world and Olympic records for 1000 yards and meters and 1 mile in addition to the prescribed 1500 meter race distance. His Olympic record at 400 meters stood until 1924 when Johnny Weissmuller broke it at Amsterdam. He was Canada's lone swimmer in 1912.

== World War I Service ==
During World War I, Hodgson served as a pilot in the Royal Naval Air Service (RNAS). He was appointed Probationer Flight Sub-Lieutenant, Ottawa on 18 January 1916, and was stationed at Chingford, then Felixstowe from 16 June 1916, where he carried out anti-submarine patrols, flying Felixstowe F2A flying boats. He was promoted to Flight Lieutenant on 30 June 1917. On 1 June 1918, he was posted to Southeast Area (service no. R 184192), and then from 18 August 1918 was pilot of Porte Baby 9810 (large flying boat) at Lerwick, Shetland, while serving at Houton Seaplane Station, Orkney. On 2 October 1918, he was posted to No.210 Training Depot Station and to Shorncliffe on 10 January 1919. He moved to the unemployed list on 22 January 1919.

=== Decorations ===
During the war, Hodgson received a number of decorations:

- Board of Trade Silver Medal for Gallantry in Saving Life at Sea, awarded on the recommendation of the President of the Board of Trade, announced in The Aeroplane, 27 March 1918; with F/Lt James Lindsay Gordon, Leading Mechanic (E) Sydney Francis Anderson, and Wireless Telegraphist (A.M.II) Bertram Harley Millichamp, ‘in recognition of their services in rescuing two men from an upturned float in the North Sea on May 29th last.’ Award effective 29 May 1917; presented at Buckingham Palace, 4 September 1918.
- Mention in Despatches, London Gazette 1 October 1917. (As Flight Lieutenant George Ritchie Hodgson, RNAS). for patrol duties in home waters.
- Air Force Cross, London Gazette 2 November 1918. (As Capt. George Ritchie Hodgson, RAF).

== Records ==
=== Olympic records ===
- 1912 gold (400 m freestyle)
- 1912 gold (1500 m freestyle)

Fastest freestyle mile in the 1911 Festival of Empire Games (now the Commonwealth Games)

== See also ==
- List of members of the International Swimming Hall of Fame
- List of Olympic medalists in swimming (men)
- World record progression 1500 metres freestyle

Records
Preceded by Henry Taylor	Men's 1500-metre freestyle world record-holder (long course); July 10, 1912 – July 8, 1923	Succeeded by Arne Borg
