= Henry Taylor (swimmer) =

British swimmer

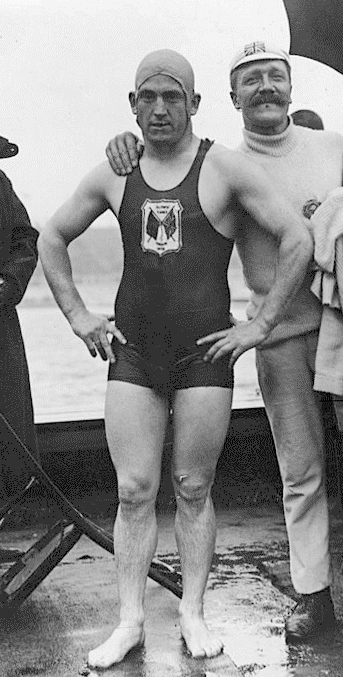
- Taylor with coach at 1908 Olympics

Personal information
- National team: Great Britain
- Born: 17 March 1885 Oldham, England
- Died: 28 February 1951 (aged 65) Oldham, England
- Height: 1.65 m (5 ft 5 in)
- Weight: 66 kg (146 lb)

Sport
- Sport: Swimming
- Strokes: Freestyle
- Club: Chadderton Swim Club; Hyde Seal Club
Medal record
Men's swimming
Representing Great Britain
Olympic Games
Gold medal – first place	1908 London	400 m freestyle
Gold medal – first place	1908 London	1500 m freestyle
Gold medal – first place	1908 London	4×200 m freestyle
Bronze medal – third place	1912 Stockholm	4×200 m freestyle
Bronze medal – third place	1920 Antwerp	4×200 m freestyle
Intercalated Games
Gold medal – first place	1906 Athens	1 mile freestyle
Silver medal – second place	1906 Athens	400 m freestyle
Bronze medal – third place	1906 Athens	4×250 m freestyle

Henry Taylor (17 March 1885 – 28 February 1951) was an English competitive swimmer who represented Great Britain in four Summer Olympics between 1906 and 1920. Taylor served in the Royal Navy during the First World War, and continued to swim competitively until 1926. His fortunes declined after he retired, and he died penniless. His record of three gold medals at one Olympic Games – the most by any Briton – stood for 100 years until it was equaled by cyclist Chris Hoy in 2008. Tying the medal count of American Mel Sheppard, he was the most successful athlete at the 1908 Olympics.

== Early life ==
Henry Taylor was born in Hollinwood in Oldham, Lancashire, on 17 March 1885 to James, a coal miner, and Elizabeth Taylor. Henry's parents died when he was young, and he was raised by his older brother, Bill. Taylor learned to swim in the Hollinwood Canal and practised in any water body he could find – baths, becks, canals, lakes, etc., including the Hollinwood Canal and Alexandra Park's boating lake. Austin Rawlinson, who was Taylor's friend and later president of Amateur Swimming Association, recalled that Taylor "loved his swimming more than anything else in life". At the age of seven Taylor swam in his first race.

Bill became his coach, and Henry trained in the Oldham Baths, and from 1894 in the Chadderton Baths, often on the "dirty water days" because of cheaper admission. During this time he continued to train in the canal, and when he got a job at a cotton mill, he spent his lunchtimes swimming in the canal. At 5 ft 5 in (1.65 m) and weighing 10 stone 6 pounds (66 kg), he wore a hand-woven silk swimming costume weighing about an ounce.

== Career ==
Taylor came to attention after success with Chadderton Swimming Club. He was selected for the 1906 Intercalated Games in Athens. Although he was not expected to win any medals, he eventually won gold in the one mile freestyle, a silver in the 400 m freestyle, and a bronze in the 4×250 m freestyle. Later that year, Taylor broke the world record for 880 yards (800 m). He was an automatic selection for the 1908 Summer Olympics.

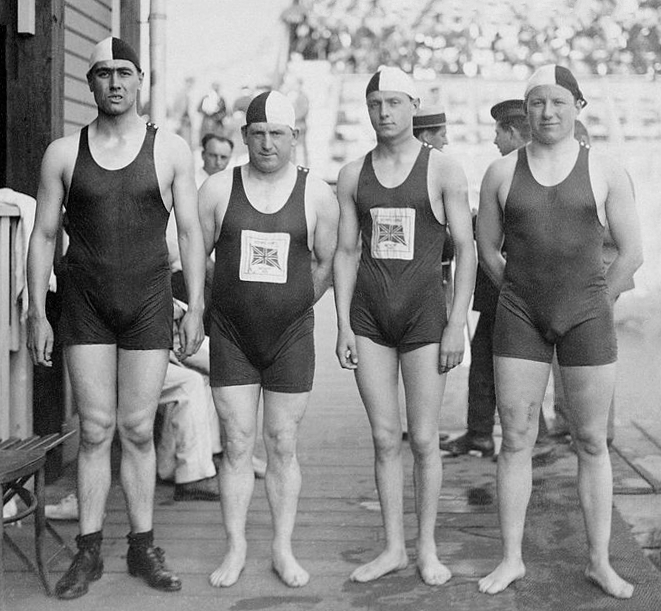
British 4 × 200 m freestyle relay team at the 1920 Olympics: Harold Annison, Henry Taylor, Percy Peter and Leslie Savage.

During the 1908 Summer Olympics in London, Taylor won gold medals in the three events in which he took part: the 400 m freestyle, the 4×200 m freestyle, and the 1500 m freestyle. He finished first in all of the races he took part in during the games bar one. After performing well in the heats of the 400 m freestyle, he finished second in the semi-final to Austrian Otto Scheff, who won the same event in the 1906 Intercalated Games. However, in the final, Taylor finished 10 seconds ahead of the Austrian, who won the bronze. The British press hailed Taylor as "Britain's Greatest Amateur Swimmer". He was the first man to hold the world record for the 1500 metres freestyle, a feat that he completed on 25 July 1908 in a time of 22:48.4 in London. His haul of three was the most gold medals won by any Briton at the Olympics. This feat was not repeated by any British participant in the Olympic Games for a century until Chris Hoy won three gold medals in cycling events at the 2008 Summer Olympics in Beijing.

Four years later, Taylor was selected for the 1912 Summer Olympics in Stockholm. In the 4×200 m freestyle relay, he helped his team win bronze. There were no Olympic Games in 1916 because of the First World War. Taylor joined the Royal Navy in 1914 and kept fit by swimming around the ships when his ship was anchored at Scapa Flow. He was present at the Battle of Jutland. A popular story tells that during the course of the battle, his ship, HMS St. Vincent, was sunk, and while the survivors waited for two hours to be rescued, Taylor swam around encouraging his crewmates. However, this story is probably a myth as HMS St Vincent was not sunk at the Battle of Jutland. He was transferred to HMS Ramillies where he remained until he was demobilised.

After the war, Taylor returned to swimming. He took part in the Morecambe Bay Race, winning eight times over a period of 20 years and at one point held the record. Taylor attempted to emulate Matthew Webb in swimming across the English Channel but failed due to bad weather. He annually took on the French champion, swimming in the River Thames and the River Seine and winning on every occasion. Taylor's last appearance in the Olympic Games was at Antwerp, Belgium, in 1920 when he again helped the 4×200 m freestyle relay team to a bronze medal.

== After swimming ==
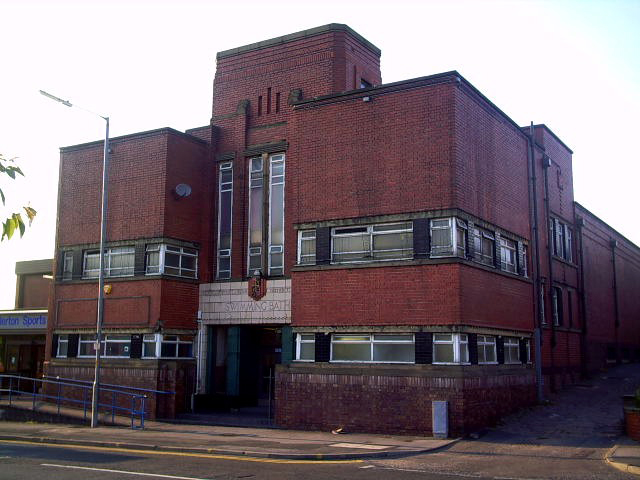
Following his Olympic career, Taylor was an attendant at Chadderton's swimming baths (pictured). Taylor's awards and a commemorative blue plaque are displayed at the baths.

Taylor continued swimming competitively into his 40s until he retired in 1926. He also played water polo for England. During his career he won over 35 trophies and 300 medals. He suffered a setback when the public house he owned in Dobcross, the Nudger, was closed due to financial difficulties. Taylor became an attendant at Chadderton Baths. To raise money, Taylor was forced to sell most of his prizes. He died in obscurity aged 65 on 28 February 1951, at lodgings in Brierley Street, Chadderton, he was penniless and unmarried. He was cremated and his remains were scattered at Rochdale Cemetery.

The trophies Taylor won were collected and temporarily displayed at Chadderton Baths. In 1969 he was posthumously inducted into the International Swimming Hall of Fame. In 2002, a blue plaque was unveiled at Chadderton Baths commemorating his swimming achievements. At the 2008 Summer Olympics in Beijing, China, Rebecca Adlington became the first British swimmer to win multiple gold medal at a single Olympic Games since Taylor won three in 1908.

== See also ==
- List of members of the International Swimming Hall of Fame
- List of Olympic medalists in swimming (men)
- World record progression 400 metres freestyle
- World record progression 800 metres freestyle
- World record progression 1500 metres freestyle
- World record progression 4 × 200 metres freestyle relay

Records
Preceded by Incumbent	Men's 1500-metres freestyle world record-holder (long course); 25 July 1908 – 10 July 1912	Succeeded by George Hodgson
