= Swimming at the 1912 Summer Olympics =

Swimming at the Games of the V Olympiad
- Venue: Djurgårdsbrunnsviken
- Dates: 6–12 July 1912
- No. of events: 9
- Competitors: 120 from 17 nations

At the 1912 Summer Olympics, nine swimming events were contested. Swimming events were held in a 100 m course built in Stockholm harbor. For the first time, women's events were part of the Olympic swimming program. The competitions were held from Saturday July 6, 1912, to Friday July 12, 1912. There was a total of 120 participants from 17 countries competing.

== Medal table ==
Rank	Nation	Gold	Silver	Bronze	Total
1	Germany	2	3	2	7
2	Australasia	2	2	2	6
3	United States	2	1	1	4
4	Canada	2	0	0	2
5	Great Britain	1	2	3	6
6	Sweden	0	1	0	1
7	Austria	0	0	1	1
Totals (7 entries)		9	9	9	27

== Medal summary ==
=== Men's events ===
Games	Gold	Silver	Bronze
100 m freestyle	Duke Kahanamoku (USA)	Cecil Healy (ANZ)	Ken Huszagh (USA)
400 m freestyle	George Hodgson (CAN)	John Hatfield (GBR)	Harold Hardwick (ANZ)
1500 m freestyle	George Hodgson (CAN)	John Hatfield (GBR)	Harold Hardwick (ANZ)
100 m backstroke	Harry Hebner (USA)	Otto Fahr (GER)	Paul Kellner (GER)
200 m breaststroke	Walter Bathe (GER)	Wilhelm Lützow (GER)	Paul Malisch (GER)
400 m breaststroke	Walter Bathe (GER)	Thor Henning (SWE)	Percy Courtman (GBR)
4 × 200 m freestyle relay	Australasia; Cecil Healy; Malcolm Champion; Leslie Boardman; Harold Hardwick	United States; Ken Huszagh; Harry Hebner; Perry McGillivray; Duke Kahanamoku	Great Britain; William Foster; Thomas Battersby; John Hatfield; Henry Taylor

=== Women's events ===
Games	Gold	Silver	Bronze
100 m freestyle	Fanny Durack (ANZ)	Wilhelmina Wylie (ANZ)	Jennie Fletcher (GBR)
4 × 100 m freestyle relay	Great Britain; Belle Moore; Jennie Fletcher; Annie Speirs; Irene Steer	Germany; Wally Dressel; Louise Otto; Hermine Stindt; Grete Rosenberg	Austria; Margarete Adler; Klara Milch; Josephine Sticker; Berta Zahourek

== Participating nations ==
A total of 120 swimmers (93 men and 27 women) from 17 nations (men from 17 nations - women from 8 nations) competed at the Stockholm Games:

- Australasia (9) (men:7 women:2)
- Austria (8) (men:3 women:5)
- Belgium (5) (men:4 women:1)
- Canada (1) (men:1 women:0)
- Denmark (1) (men:1 women:0)
- Finland (6) (men:4 women:2)
- France (3) (men:3 women:0)
- Germany (17) (men:13 women:4)
- Great Britain (18) (men:12 women:6)
- Greece (1) (men:1 women:0)
- Hungary (8) (men:8 women:0)
- Italy (2) (men:2 women:0)
- Norway (5) (men:4 women:1)
- Russia (4) (men:4 women:0)
- South Africa (1) (men:1 women:0)
- Sweden (24) (men:18 women:6)
- United States (7) (men:7 women:0)
