= History of competitive swimwear =

The history of competitive swimwear has been dominated by concerns over public nudity in the first half of the 20th century and by efforts to reduce water drag in the second half. Those efforts initially led swimmers to reduce the early sagging one-piece swimsuits down to briefs only. With the development of new materials that tightly fit the body and offered lower resistance to water than human skin, this trend was reversed to a complete body coverage from heels to neck and wrists. FINA banned full-body suits from competition effective from 1 January 2010, stating that it "wishes to recall the main and core principle is that swimming is a sport essentially based on the physical performance of the athlete".

Goggles were used in the crossing of the English Channel back in 1911, but only in 1970 appeared at international competitions. With the advent of rubber technology, latex swimming caps became mass-produced in the 1920s, and more efficient silicone caps appeared in the 1970s.

Today, competitive swimwear is a major business for companies like Speedo, Arena and TYR and its development involves such institutions as NASA and Australian Institute of Sport.

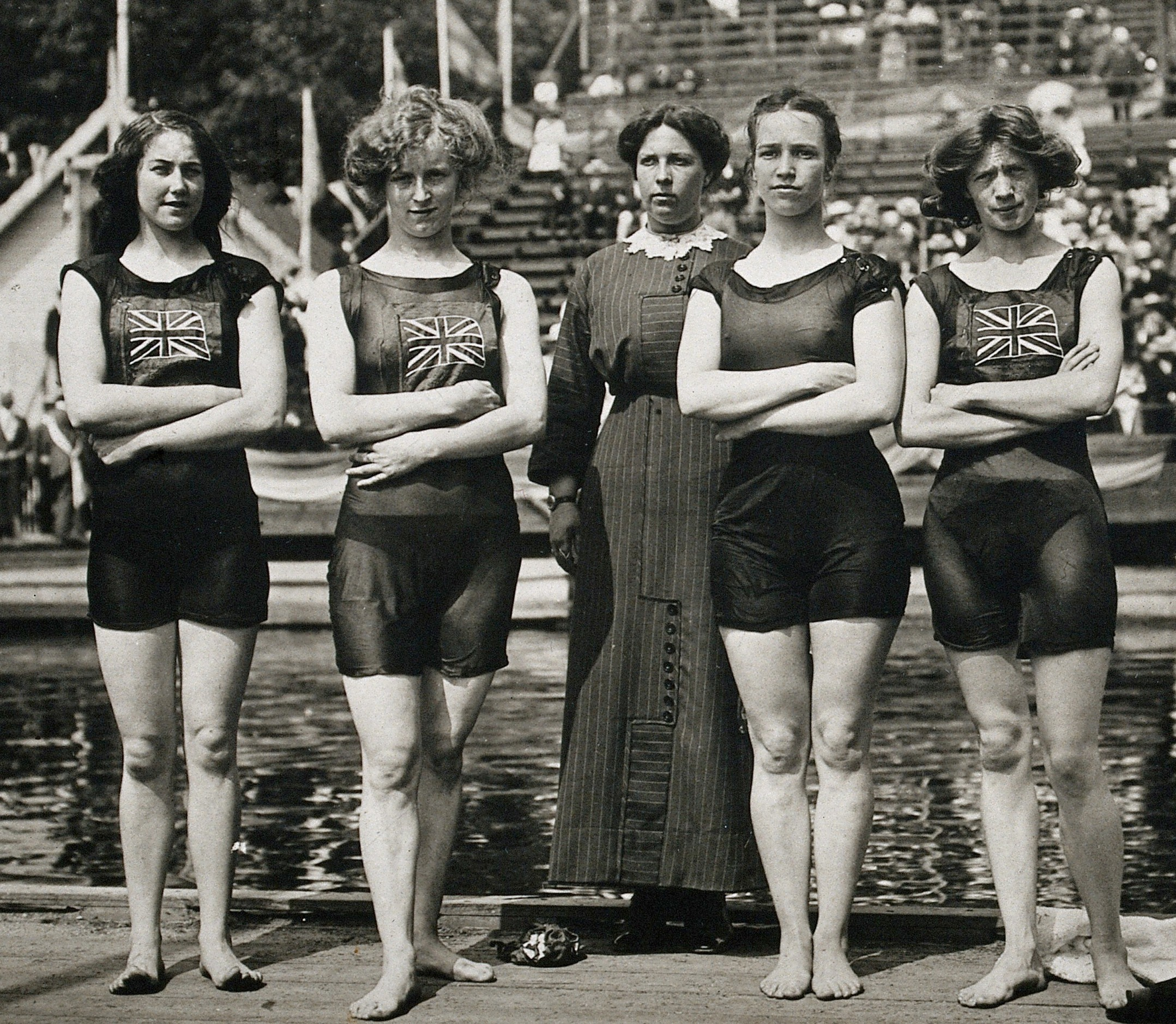
British 4 × 100 m freestyle team members, from left to right, Belle Moore, Jennie Fletcher, Annie Speirs and Irene Steer, at the 1912 Olympics, wearing silk suits and bikinis, with a chaperone in the middle

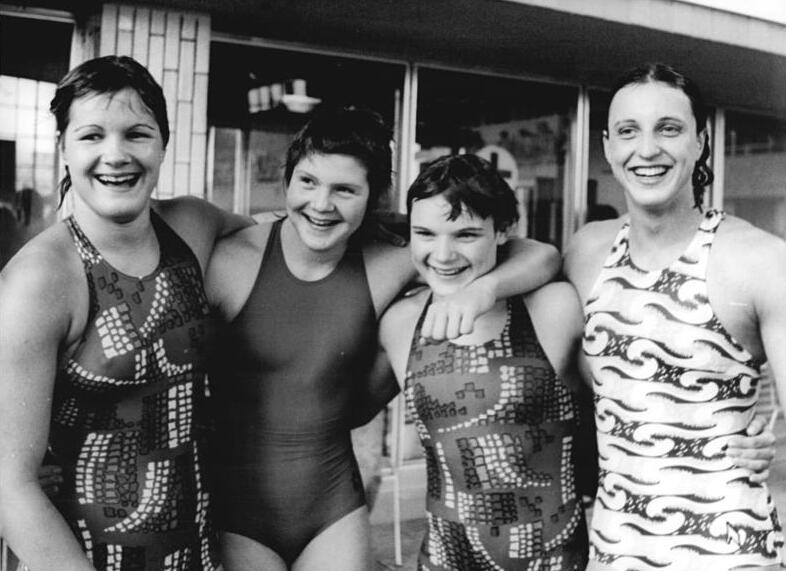
East German swimmers, from left to right, Monika Seltmann, Carola Nitschke, Andrea Pollack, Barbara Krause, wearing skinsuits at the 1976 national championships

== Early years ==
Olympic Games have been the most important international swimming competition. While men's events were an integral part of all Olympics, women's races were introduced only in 1912, and until 1924 were limited to a couple of freestyle events.

Public nudity was a major concern in designing early swimwear. It was a major factor behind the non-participation of American women in the 1912 Olympics. At those Games British women wore full-body silk suits of such a volume that they could be passed through a wedding ring. The suits were complemented by bras and bikini-style briefs as they became transparent when wet. Women's coaches were rare at early Olympics, and to further reduce the chances of harassment women were accompanied by chaperones. Even men wore one-piece swimsuits covering the body from hips to shoulders up to the 1940s. In 1928, Speedo introduced their racerback silk suit that was optimized to fit the body shape. It uncovered the shoulder blades, which almost resulted in disqualification of Clare Dennis at the 1932 Olympics, but became a norm by 1936. Meanwhile, men were allowed to swim in bare-chest suits in 1936, and in briefs only at the 1948 Olympics. In 1956, Speedo became the first company to introduce nylon and in the 1970s elastane to their swimsuits that improved their elasticity, durability and water drag – 21 out of 22 records at the 1972 Olympics were broken using nylon/elastane suits.

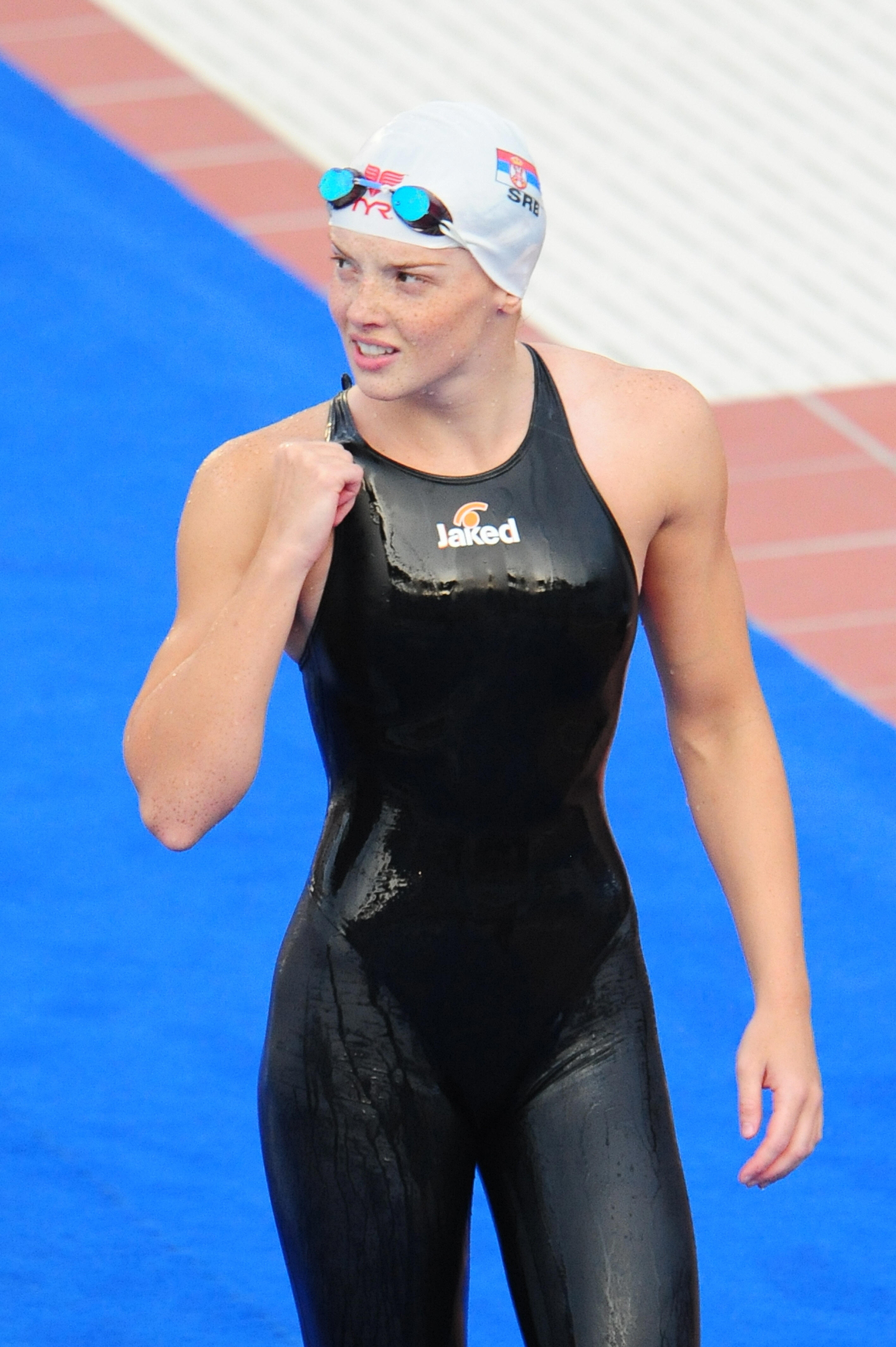
Nađa Higl in a Jaked skinsuit in 2010

At the same Olympics, East German swimmers adopted suits that were tightly following the body shape, the so-called "skinsuits". They were initially made of cotton and became virtually transparent when wet. The revealing shape and transparency caused outrage among US swimmers; meanwhile, at the 1973 World Aquatics Championships, East German women won 10 of 14 events and set seven world records. Those championships became the turning point for the world to adopt the skinsuit, modified with novel synthetic materials, as a standard competitive swimwear.

== Biomimetic suits ==
In 2000, Speedo launched the Fastskin suit series that mimicked shark skin. Their surface contained bumps and ridges that channeled the water over the swimmer's body approximately 3% more efficiently than traditional materials. Those suits covered most of the body, from neck to ankles and wrists, and their shape was optimized for specific swimming strokes, compressing some body parts while allowing more freedom to the others. Those suits were approved for the 2000 Olympics, where they helped win 83% of the medals. By the next Olympics, similar suits had been developed by Tyr Sport, Inc., but they were not approved by the FINA.

== Non-textile swimsuits ==
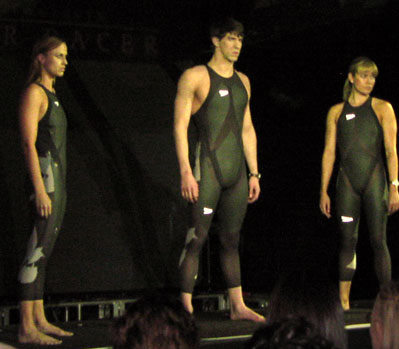
Amanda Beard (left), Michael Phelps (center), and Natalie Coughlin (right) wearing the LZR Racer Suit during its unveiling at a press conference in New York City in February 2008.

In February 2008, Speedo launched the LZR Racer swimsuit based on woven elastane-nylon and polyurethane (50%). The suit was developed by Italian company Mectex with the Australian Institute of Sport and NASA, which provided wind-tunnel testing facilities. The suits were manufactured at Petratex, a textile factory in Paços de Ferreira, Portugal, where the technology is patented. Like other suits used for high-competition racing, LZR Racer allows for better oxygen flow to the muscles, and holds the body in a more hydrodynamic position, while repelling water and increasing flexibility. The seams of the suit are ultrasonically welded to further reduce drag. The suit is chlorine-resistant and quick to dry. The suit reportedly can lower racing times by 2 to 4%.

FINA endorsed the suit for competitive use before the 2008 Beijing Olympics, where swimmers wearing the suit set 23 out of 25 world records and won 94% of the races and 89% of the medals.

Other companies offered their own alternative non-textile suits in 2008, including the 100% polyurethane Arena X-Glide, Jaked01 and Adidas Hydrofoil. By 24 August 2009, more than 130 world records had been broken by swimmers wearing non-textile suits, and more than 90 of them were set with the LZR Racer.

=== FINA rule changes ===
In 2009, the FINA Congress voted almost unanimously to revert its policy and ban all body-length swimsuits. The decision was taken in Rome on 24 July 2009, during the 2009 World Aquatics Championships. The new policy states that men's swimsuits may maximally cover the area from the waist to the knee, and women's counterparts from the shoulder to the knee. FINA also ruled that the fabric used must be a textile or a woven material and that a suit may not have any fastening devices such as a zipper (drawstrings on male jammers are allowed). Textile was defined as any open-mesh material like cotton, nylon, Lycra, etc. The new regulations took effect on 1 January 2010, and the previous records set in non-textile suits remain valid.

== Goggles ==
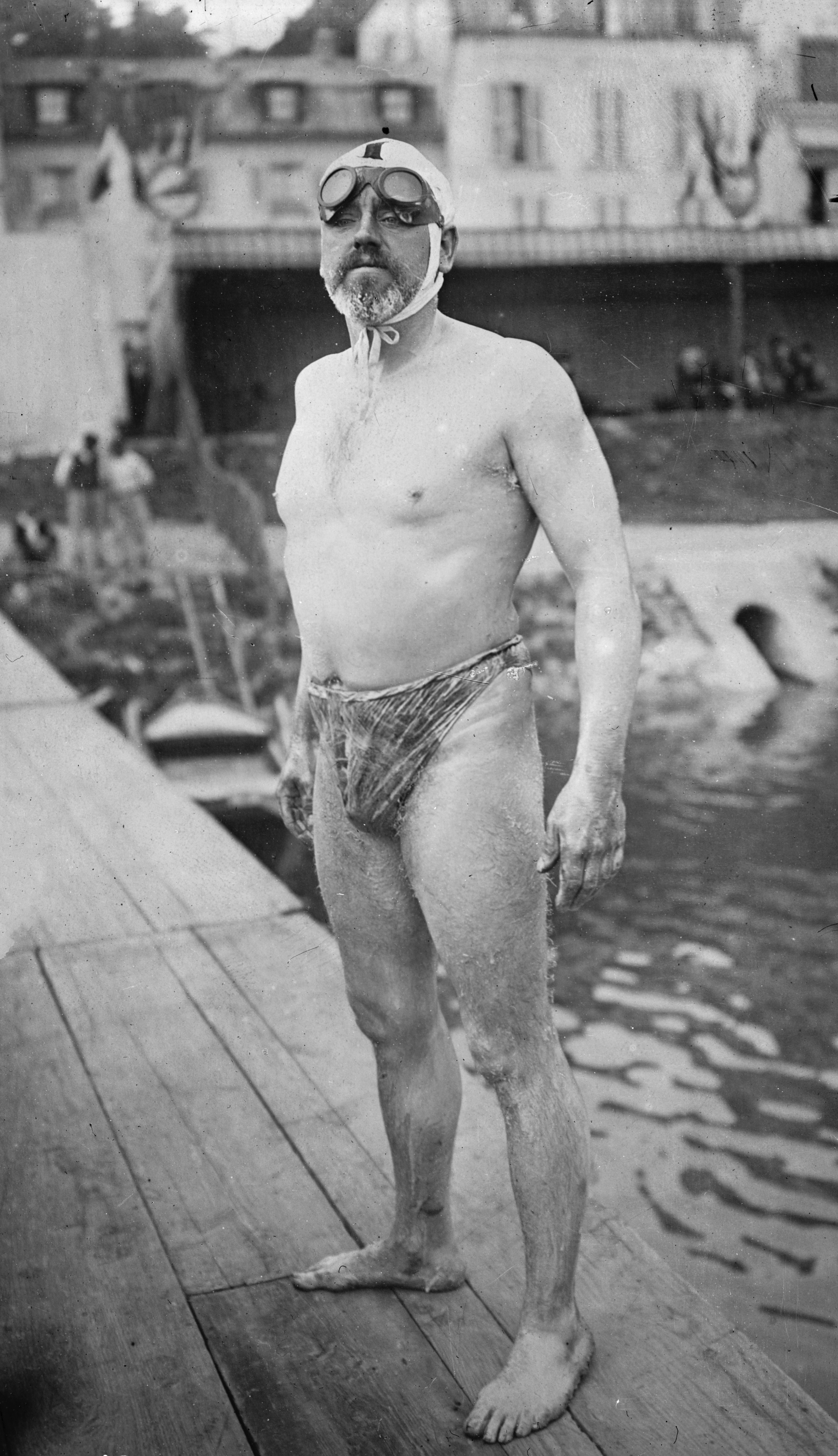
Thomas William Burgess wearing his motorcycle goggles in 1911

The first competitive swimmer to use goggles was Thomas William Burgess, during his crossing of the English Channel in 1911. His motorcycle goggles leaked water, yet they protected his eyes from water splashes during his breaststroke-only swim. In 1926, Gertrude Ederle also used motorcycle goggles when crossing the Channel. She swam crawl and therefore sealed her goggles with paraffin to render them water tight. Meanwhile, the vast majority of pool swimmers had no eye protection until the late 1960s, which limited their training time due to the eye irritation with disinfectants added to the pool water. When the first commercial goggles were introduced to competitive swimmers in 1968 they were met with limited success because of their fixed and rigid shape. Most swimmers could not fit them to their face and complained about leaks, especially after starts and turns. Only two years later David Wilkie became the first swimmer to use goggles in international pool competitions, at the 1970 Commonwealth Games. Goggles were first allowed at the Olympics in 1976, and many athletes used them in preparation at the 1972 Games.

== Caps ==
Swimming caps were used since the early 1900s, when they were made of cotton, silk, or rubberized fabrics and often featured an "aviator-style" chin strap to hold the cap in place. Stretchable and water-tight latex caps became widely available in the 1920s and more durable and smooth silicone caps in the 1970s. Further efforts to improve silicone caps went into eliminating wrinkles, which resulted in the seamless caps and then in more rigid "racing dome" caps of globular shape.

== See also ==
- Competitive swimwear
- High-technology swimwear fabric
- History of bikini
- History of swimwear
- Swimming at the Summer Olympics

== Bibliography ==
- "London Olympics 2012: The evolution of Olympic swimsuits". Daily News. 8 June 2012. Archived from the original on 9 August 2012.
