= Swimming at the 1912 Summer Olympics – Women's 100 metre freestyle =

Women's 100 metre freestyle at the Games of the V Olympiad
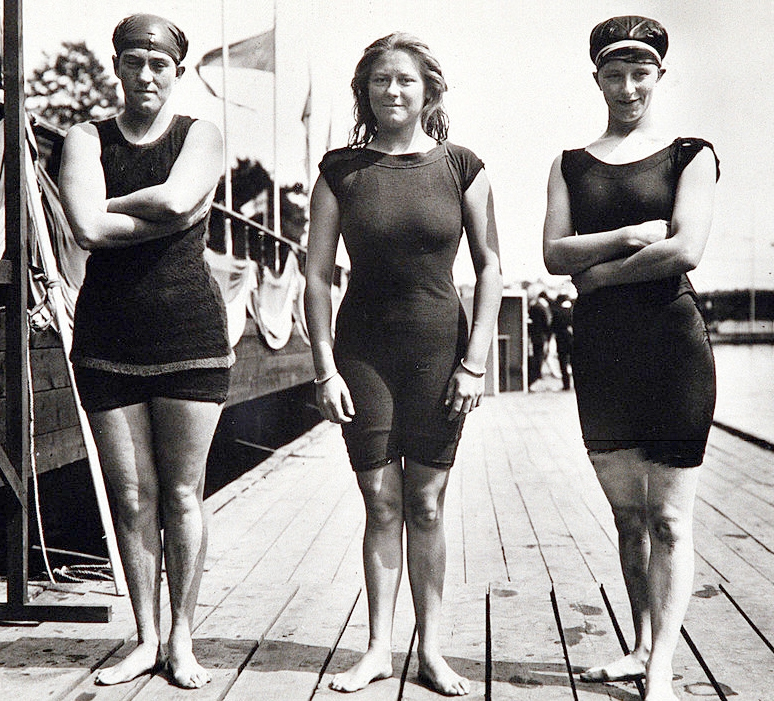
- Fanny Durack, Mina Wylie and Jennie Fletcher at the 1912 Olympics
- Venue: Djurgårdsbrunnsviken
- Dates: 8–12 July
- Competitors: 27 from 8 nations

Medalists
1st place, gold medalist(s)		Fanny Durack	Australasia
2nd place, silver medalist(s)		Mina Wylie	Australasia
3rd place, bronze medalist(s)		Jennie Fletcher	Great Britain

The women's 100 metre freestyle was a swimming event held as part of the swimming at the 1912 Summer Olympics programme. It was the first appearance of a women's event in Olympic swimming, followed closely by the 4×100 metre free relay. The competition was held from Monday to Friday, 8 to 12 July 1912.

Twenty-seven swimmers from eight nations competed.

Durack also won the gold medal, with compatriot Wylie close behind for silver.

== Records ==
These were the standing world and Olympic records (in minutes) prior to the 1912 Summer Olympics.

World record	1:20.6	(United Kingdom) Daisy Curwen	Birkenhead (GBR)	10 June 1912
Olympic record		none		

Belle Moore, swimming in the first heat, set the first Olympic record with 1 minute 29.8 seconds. In the second heat Daisy Curwen bettered the record with 1 minute 23.6 seconds, and in the fourth heat Fanny Durack set a new world record with 1 minute 19.8 seconds.

== Results ==
=== Quarterfinals ===
The top two in each heat advanced along with the fastest loser overall.

==== Heat 1 ====
Place	Swimmer	Time	Qual.
1	Belle Moore (GBR)	1:29.8	QS OR
2	Louise Otto (GER)	1:34.4	QS
3	Klara Milch (AUT)	1:37.2	
4	Greta Johansson (SWE)	1:41.4	
5	Tyyne Järvi (FIN)	1:42.4	
—	Aagot Norman (NOR)	DNF	

==== Heat 2 ====
Place	Swimmer	Time	Qual.
1	Daisy Curwen (GBR)	1:23.6	QS OR
2	Jennie Fletcher (GBR)	1:26.2	QS
3	Berta Zahourek (AUT)	1:38.6	
4	Josefa Kellner (AUT)	1:41.2	
5	Karin Lundgren (SWE)	1:44.8	
6	Sonja Johnsson (SWE)		

==== Heat 3 ====
Place	Swimmer	Time	Qual.
1	Mina Wylie (ANZ)	1:26.8	QS
2	Mary Langford (GBR)	1:28.0	QS
3	Hermine Stindt (GER)	1:29.2	
4	Josephine Sticker (AUT)	1:31.8	
5	Claire Guttenstein (BEL)		
6	Elsa Björklund (SWE)		

==== Heat 4 ====
Place	Swimmer	Time	Qual.
1	Fanny Durack (ANZ)	1:19.8	QS WR
2	Irene Steer (GBR)	1:27.2	QS
3	Wally Dressel (GER)	1:28.6	qs
4	Margarete Adler (AUT)	1:34.4	
5	Greta Carlsson (SWE)		
6	Regina Kari (FIN)		

==== Heat 5 ====
Place	Swimmer	Time	Qual.
1	Grete Rosenberg (GER)	1:25.0	QS
2	Annie Speirs (GBR)	1:25.6	QS
3	Vera Thulin (SWE)	1:44.0	

=== Semifinals ===
The top two from each heat and the faster of the two third place swimmers advanced.

Semifinal 1

Place	Swimmer	Time	Qual.
1	Fanny Durack (ANZ)	1:20.2	QF
2	Daisy Curwen (GBR)	1:26.8	QF
3	Annie Speirs (GBR)	1:27.0	qf
4	Belle Moore (GBR)	1:27.4	
5	Mary Langford (GBR)	1:29.2	
6	Louise Otto (GER)	1:32.0	

Semifinal 2

Place	Swimmer	Time	Qual.
1	Mina Wylie (ANZ)	1:27.0	QF
2	Jennie Fletcher (GBR)	1:27.2	QF
3	Grete Rosenberg (GER)	1:29.2	*
4	Wally Dressel (GER)	1:33.4	
—	Irene Steer (GBR)	DQ	

Curwen had to undergo an operation for appendicitis and missed the final. Rosenberg advanced to the final to replace her.

=== Final ===
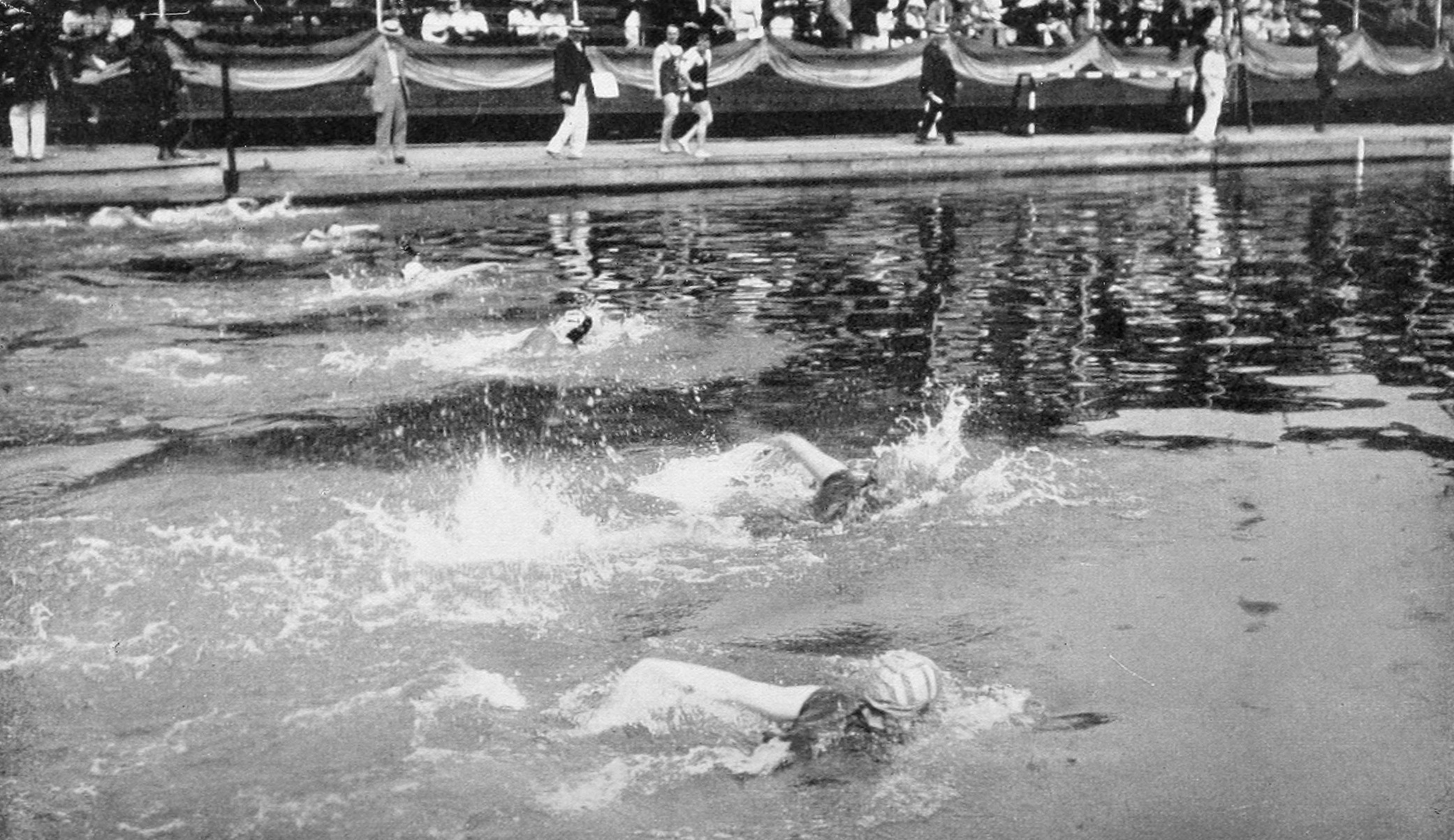
The final

Place	Swimmer	Time
1	Fanny Durack (ANZ)	1:22.2
2	Mina Wylie (ANZ)	1:25.4
3	Jennie Fletcher (GBR)	1:27.0
4	Grete Rosenberg (GER)	1:27.2
5	Annie Speirs (GBR)	1:27.4
—	Daisy Curwen (GBR)	DNS

== Notes ==
- Bergvall, Erik, ed. (1913). The Official Report of the Olympic Games of Stockholm 1912. Translated by Adams-Ray, Edward. Stockholm: Wahlström & Widstrand.
- Philipps, Wolfgang: „There was a hard struggle between Miss Fletcher and Fräulein Rosenberg“. Ein Beitrag zur niedersächsischen Schwimmsport-Geschichte (in German). In: Jahrbuch des Niedersächsischen Instituts für Sportgeschichte, Bd. 20-21 (2017-2018), pp. 183–209
- Wudarski, Pawel (1999). "Wyniki Igrzysk Olimpijskich" (in Polish).
