= Otto Scheff =

Austrian swimmer (1889–1956)

- Scheff as a youth

Personal information
- Full name: Otto Friedrich Wilhelm Scheff
- National team: Austria
- Born: December 12, 1889 Berlin, German Empire
- Died: October 26, 1956 (aged 66) Maria Enzersdorf, Austria
- Occupations: Attorney, politician Sports Official

Sport
- Sport: Swimming
- Strokes: Freestyle
- Club: Wiener Athletiksport Club
Medal record
Representing Austrian Empire
Olympic Games
Bronze medal – third place	1908 London	400 m freestyle
Intercalated Games
Gold medal – first place	1906 Athens	400 m freestyle
Bronze medal – third place	1906 Athens	1 mile

Otto Scheff, born Otto Sochaczewsky (December 12, 1889 – October 26, 1956) was an Austrian freestyle swimmer, water polo player, lawyer, politician, and sports official who competed in the 1906 Intercalated Games, and both the 1908, and 1912 Summer Olympics. He later worked as an attorney in Vienna, served in the National Council of Austria, and was the vice-president of the Austrian Olympic Committee.

Scheff was born in Berlin on September 12, 1889 into the family of Jewish writer Heinrich Sochaczewsky, who published under the pseudonym Victor von Falk. Scheff grew up in Wien (Vienna), Austria, soon distinguishing himself globally as the top middle-distance freestyler in the era of the trudgeon stroke, prior to the broad introduction of the Australian crawl. He swam for the Wiener Athletiksport Club. He first gained international recognition in 1905 at the international tournament held in Paris, then known as the World Championships, where he placed third in the 500-m freestyle behind British swimmers David Billington and Eric Forsyth.

== Records ==
Scheff set a long course European and World record of 2:31.6 in the 200-meter freestyle on 11 November 1908 in Vienna, Austria that held through 12 December 1924. His 200-meter record held as a world record that held through 9 September 1910.

From 1906-1908, Scheff established a total of four world records. He set the world record in the 1000 meter freestyle in 1908, which held through 1912 when it was broken by Canadian Hall of Fame swimmer George Hodgson.

He was attending school in 1906 when the Austrian Olympic Committee intervened in his schooling to allow him three weeks leave to compete in the 1906 Intercalated Games in Athens.

=== 1906 Intercalated Games ===
At the 1906 Intercalated Games in Athens, he competed in three events, beginning with the 1 mile freestyle race, a single heat where Scheff won the bronze medal behind gold medalist Henry Taylor and silver medalist John Arthur Jarvis both part of the British team.

Scheff subsequently won the gold medal by a two second margin in the 400 metre freestyle. He swam as part of the 4×250 metre freestyle relay team, which did not complete the event.

=== 1908 Olympics ===
Two years later he was in London for the 1908 Summer Olympics, and again entered three events.

In the 400 metre freestyle he won another bronze medal with a time of 5:46.0 after once again placing behind British swimmer Henry Taylor who took gold with a 5:36.8. He reached the semi-finals of the 1500 metre freestyle swimming a 24:25.4 in the second semi-final heat, but didn't complete the final, where British swimmer Henry Taylor, with a time of 22:48.4 again took the gold medal. He qualified for the semi-finals of the 100 metre freestyle, by swimming a 1:11.4 in his preliminary heat, but did not swim in the semi-finals.

=== 1912 Stockholm Olympics ===
Scheff trained Austria's 1912 women's Olympic swim team that won the bronze medal with a combined time of 6:27.0 in the 4×100 m freestyle behind the gold medal British and silver medal German team. The Austrian women's relay team was composed of Klara Milch, Josephine Sticker, Margarete Adler and Berta Zahourek, who were considered the most accomplished Austrian women's swimmers prior to the first World War.

At the 1912 Summer Olympics in Stockholm Scheff participated in the water polo tournament as part of the Austrian team which finished in fourth place. He was scheduled to participate in the 100 and 400-meter freestyle, but did not swim in his preliminary heat.

=== Later life ===
Scheff attended the University of Vienna, graduating in 1913 with a law degree, and enjoyed a successful career practicing law as a Viennese attorney.

From 1945 to 1953 he served in the National Council of Austria as a member of the Austrian People's Party, and served as the vice-president of the Austrian Olympic Committee.

He died at Maria Enzersdorf in 1956.

His daughter Gertraud Scheff was already qualified for the 1940 Summer Olympics in Tokyo, when the games were cancelled.

=== Honors ===
Scheff was inducted to the International Swimming Hall of Fame in 1988.

In his honor, Mödling, 15 km South of Vienna, named a street "Dr. Otto Scheff-Weg".

== See also ==
- List of members of the International Swimming Hall of Fame
- List of select Jewish swimmers
- World record progression 200 metres freestyle
