= Thulin =

Thulin is a Swedish surname. Notable people with the surname include:

- Camilla Thulin (born 1961), Swedish fashion designer
- Einar Thulin (1896–1963), Swedish high jumper
- Enoch Thulin (1881–1919), Swedish aircraft engineer, founder of AB Thulinverken
- Hans-Christian Thulin (born 1977), Swedish actor
- Ingrid Thulin (1926–2004), Swedish actress
- Jonathan Thulin (born 1988), Swedish singer
- Lars Uno Thulin (1939–2002), Norwegian engineer, civil servant and politician
- Vera Thulin (1893–1974), Swedish swimmer
- Willy Thulin (1889–1967), Swedish diver
- Tobias Thulin (born 1995), Swedish handballer

== Other ==
- 12379 Thulin, a minor planet
- Thulin aircraft, including a list of planes made by Swedish company AB Thulinverken
- Thulin A (automobile), built by Enoch Thulins Aeroplanfabrik, 1920–1925
- Thulin B (automobile), built by AB Thulinverken, 1926–1927
