= Daisy Curwen =

British swimmer (1889–1982)

Personal information
- Full name: Margaret Daisy Curwen
- Nationality: British
- Born: 6 December 1889 Liverpool, England
- Died: 25 June 1982 (aged 92) Wallasey, England

Sport
- Sport: Swimming

Daisy Curwen, later known by her married name Margaret Wright, (6 December 1889 – 25 June 1982) was a former British swimmer world record holder in the 100 m freestyle. Curwen competed at the 1912 Summer Olympics in Stockholm, but could not start in the final race any more due to appendicitis and an appendectomy prior to the finals.

== Biography ==
Curwen was born in December 1889 in Liverpool, England. She began swimming with her local club in Liverpool when she was 13. Between 1903 and 1917, Curwen won the Liverpool and District 100 yards freestyle event fourteen times. Curwen broke the world record for the 100 metres freestyle twice, first in September 1911 and again in June 1912. She also set six more world records in events from the 100 to 300 yards.

At the 1912 Summer Olympics in Stockholm, Sweden, Curwen competed in the women's 100 metre freestyle event. In her heat, Curwen set a new Olympic record. She went on to qualify for the final of the race, but was unable to start, after suffering with appendicitis which required surgery. As a result, Curwen also missed an opportunity to swim in the women's 4 × 100 metre freestyle relay race, where Great Britain won the gold medal.

Curwen did not compete in swimming after World War I. She was married to Tom Wright. She died in Wallasey on June 25, 1982 at the age of 92.

== See also ==
- World record progression 100 metres freestyle

Records
Preceded by Claire Guttenstein	Women's 100 m freestyle world record-holder (long course); 29 September 1911 – 9 July 1912	Succeeded by Fanny Durack
