= Aagot =

Norwegian feminine given name

Aagot or Ågot is a feminine Norwegian given name. Notable people with the name include:

- Aagot Børseth (1898–1993), Norwegian actress
- Aagot Didriksen (1874–1968), Norwegian actress
- Aagot Lading (1909–1963), Danish educator
- Aagot Nissen (1882–1978), Norwegian actress
- Aagot Norman (1892–1979), Norwegian swimmer
- Aagot Raaen (1873–1957), American writer and educator
- Ågot Valle (born 1945), Norwegian politician
- Aagot Vinterbo-Hohr (born 1936), Norwegian physician and writer

== See also ==
- Aagot (1882), a shipwreck of South Australia
