= Claire Guttenstein =

Belgian swimmer (1886–1948)

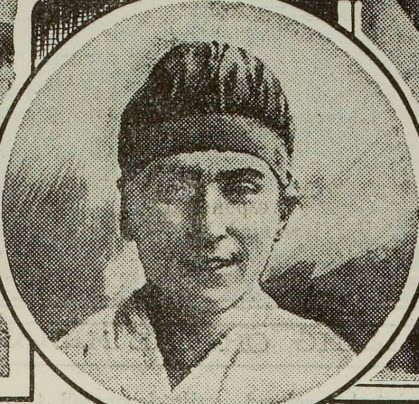
- Claire Guttenstein in 1910 in Paris

Personal information
- Born: September 19, 1886 Saint-Josse-ten-Noode, Belgium
- Died: April 20, 1948 (aged 61) Jette, Belgium

Sport
- Sport: Swimming

Claire Guttenstein (née Frick then Guttenstein, then Gutt; September 19, 1886 – April 20, 1948) was a Belgian swimmer from the early twentieth century, and was the first Belgian female to represent her country in the Olympic Games and an ex-world record holder in swimming.

Born in Saint-Josse-ten-Noode, she met economist Camille Guttenstein while he studied at the Free University of Brussels, they shared the same interest in theatre, and they married in 1906, she went on to have three sons Etienne, Francois and Jean-Max.

From October 2, 1910, to September 29, 1911, Guttenstein was the world record holder at 100 meters freestyle, with a time of 1:26.6. During this period, she was known for being victorious in many races with men. During the 1912 Olympic Games in Stockholm, twenty-four-year-old Guttenstein swam in one competition, the 100 meters freestyle, where she finished in fifth place in the third qualifying race and was eliminated from further competition, she was the oldest out of all the swimmers in this event.

In the early 1920s, her husband decided to change their surname to Gutt. In 1940, she convinced her husband to leave Belgium. In London, Camille would play an important role in the Belgian government in exile, Claire herself remained in Brussels where she headed the charity Secours d'hiver.

== See also ==
- World record progression 100 metres freestyle

Records
Preceded by Martha Gerstung	Women's 100 m freestyle world record holder (long course); 2 October 1910 – 29 September 1911	Succeeded by Daisy Curwen
