= Sonja Johnsson =

Swedish swimmer (1895–1986)

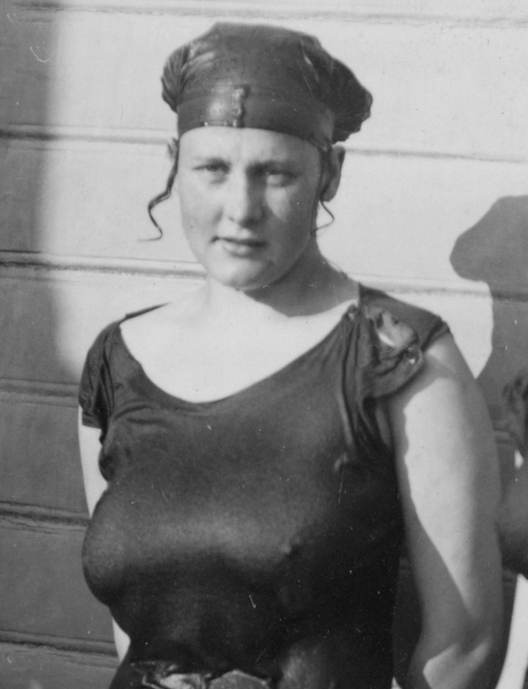

Personal information
- Full name: Sonja Sofia Valfrida Johnsson
- Nationality: Swedish
- Born: 7 August 1895 Stockholm, Sweden
- Died: 18 June 1986 (aged 90) Stockholm, Sweden

Sport
- Sport: Swimming
- Strokes: Freestyle
- Club: Stockholms KK

Sonja Sofia Valfrida Johnsson (later Dymling, 7 August 1895 – 18 June 1986) was a Swedish freestyle swimmer who competed in the 1912 Summer Olympics. She was eliminated in the first round of the 100 m event and finished fourth with the Swedish 4 × 100 m team.

Her nephew Stein competed for Norway in the discus throw at the 1948 and 1952 Olympics.
