= Elsa Björklund =

Swedish swimmer

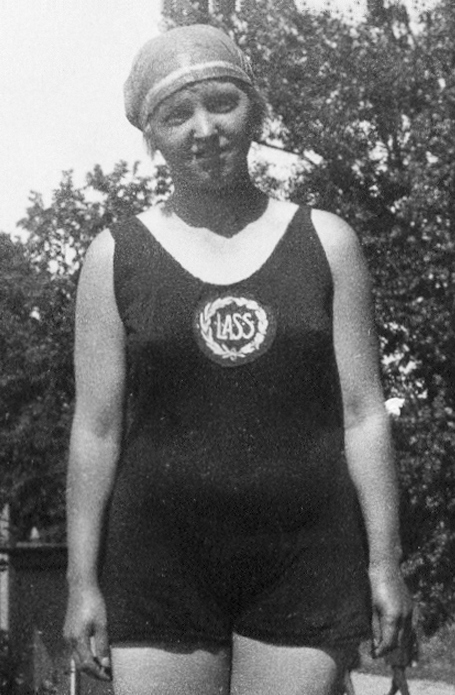

Personal information
- Born: 14 January 1895 Stockholm, Sweden
- Died: 15 May 1970 (aged 75) Stockholm, Sweden

Sport
- Sport: Swimming
- Strokes: Freestyle
- Club: Stockholms KK

Elsa Björklund (14 January 1895 – 15 May 1970) was a Swedish swimmer. She competed in the 100 metre freestyle event at the 1912 Summer Olympics, but failed to reach the final.
