= Greta Carlsson =

Swedish swimmer

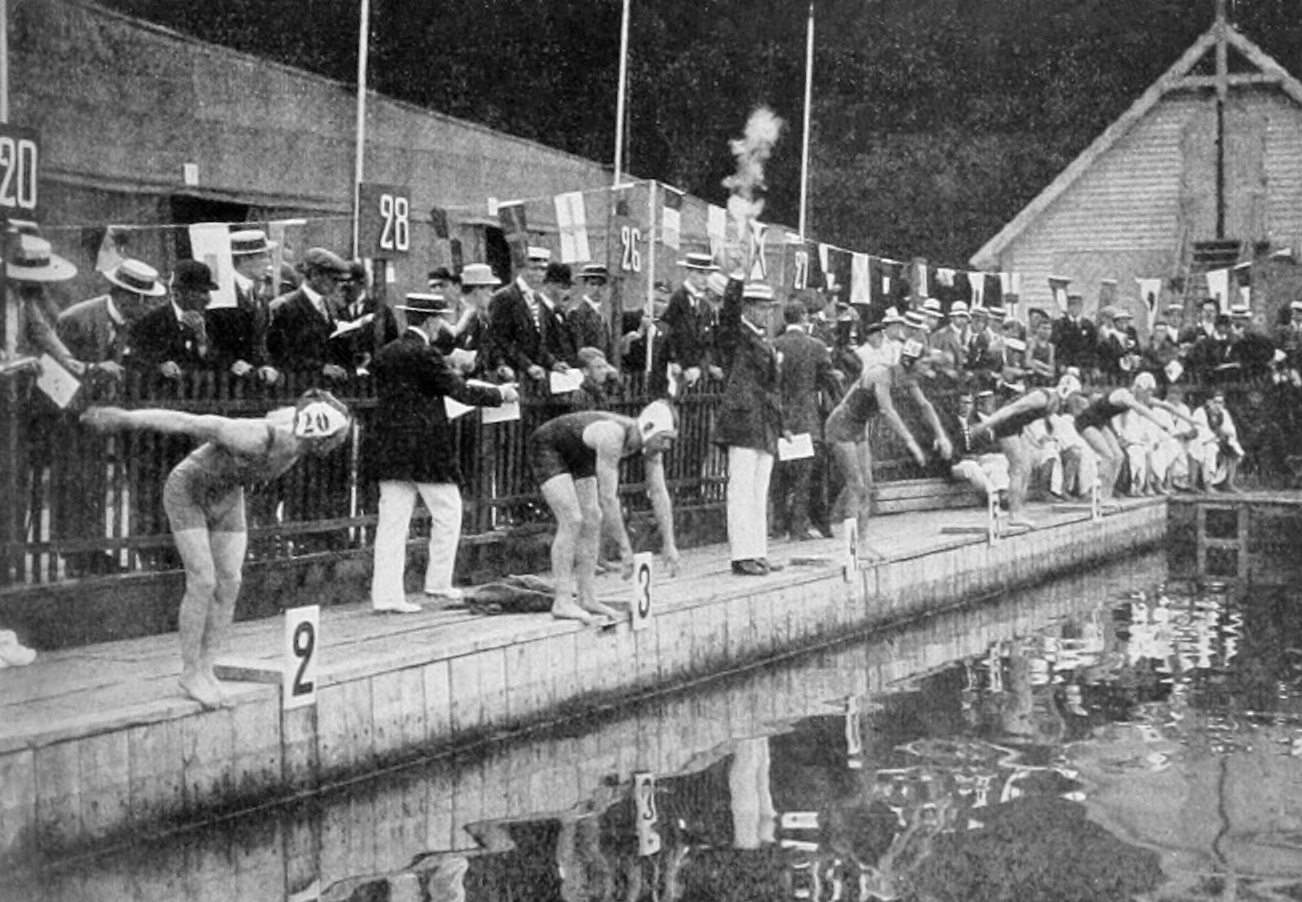

Personal information
- Full name: Greta Ingeborg Carlsson
- Nationality: Swedish
- Born: July 7, 1898 Eskilstuna, Södermanland
- Died: March 19, 1980 (aged 81) Sundbyberg, Stockholm

Sport
- Sport: Swimming
- Strokes: Freestyle
- Club: Eskilstuna Simsällskap

Greta Carlsson (later Nygren, July 7, 1898 – March 19, 1980) was a Swedish freestyle swimmer who competed in the 1912 Summer Olympics.

In 1912 she was part of the Swedish team which finished fourth in the 4 x 100 metre freestyle relay event at the 1912 Summer Olympics. In the solo 100 metre freestyle competition she was eliminated in the first round.

== Sources ==
- Evans, Hilary; Gjerde, Arild; Heijmans, Jeroen; Mallon, Bill; et al. "Greta Carlsson". Olympics at Sports-Reference.com. Sports Reference LLC. Archived from the original on 2010-01-12.
