= Willy Thulin =

Swedish diver

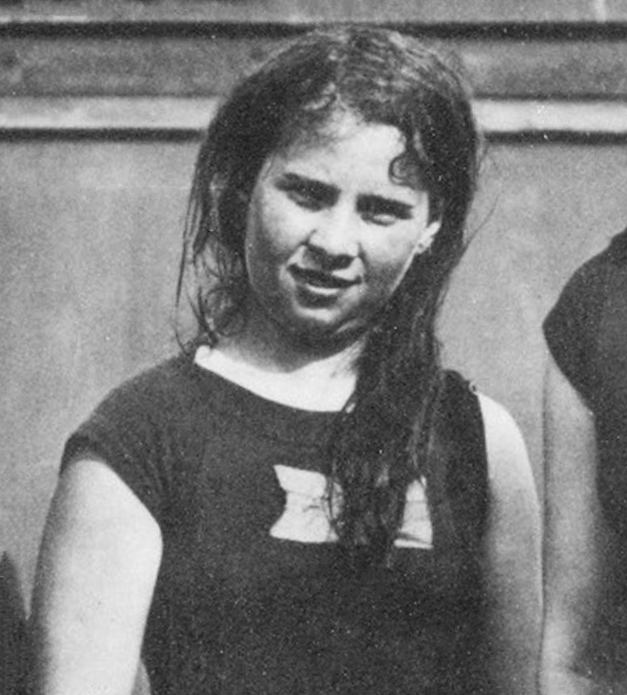

Personal information
- Born: 26 October 1889 Uppsala, Sweden
- Died: 3 May 1967 (aged 77) Stockholm, Sweden

Sport
- Sport: Diving
- Club: Stockholms KK

Villy "Willy" Elvira Thulin (later Sandberg, 26 October 1889 – 3 May 1967) was a Swedish diver. She competed in the 1912 Summer Olympics, but was eliminated in the first round of the 10 m platform event. Her younger sister Vera competed in swimming at the same Olympics.
