= Jennie Fletcher =

British swimmer (1890–1968)

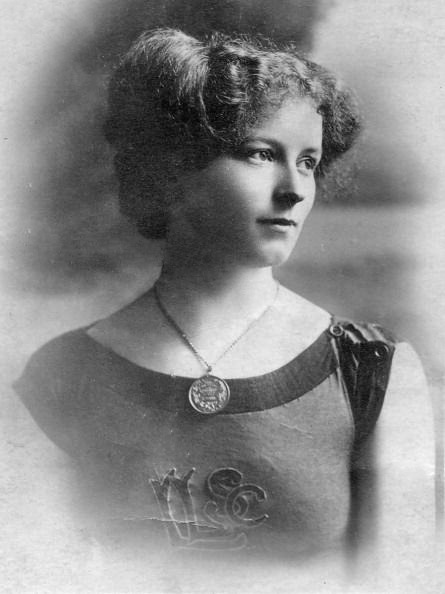
- Jennie Fletcher, c. 1905

Personal information
- Full name: Jennie Fletcher
- National team: Great Britain
- Born: 19 March 1890 Belgrave, Leicester, England
- Died: 17 January 1968 (aged 77) Teeswater, Ontario, Canada

Sport
- Sport: Swimming
- Strokes: Freestyle
- Club: Leicester Ladies SC
Medal record
Women's swimming
Representing Great Britain
Olympic Games
Gold medal – first place	1912 Stockholm	4×100 m freestyle
Bronze medal – third place	1912 Stockholm	100 m freestyle

Jennie Fletcher (19 March 1890 – 17 January 1968), later known by her married name Jennie Hyslop, was a British competitive swimmer, Olympic gold medallist, and former world record-holder. In 1905 she set a new world record in the 100-yard freestyle that stood for seven years. She was selected for the 1908 Olympics, but the women's swimming events were cancelled due to a shortage of participants. At the 1912 Summer Olympics, she won a gold medal in the 4×100-metre freestyle relay and a bronze medal in the individual 100-metre freestyle race. In 1971 she was inducted to the International Swimming Hall of Fame as an "Honor Swimmer".

Fletcher was born in an underprivileged family of 11 siblings and had to combine swimming with daily 12-hour work. In 1913, she began teaching swimming in Leicester, which ended her competitive career as she turned from an amateur into a professional. In 1917, she married and immigrated to Canada, where she gave birth to a daughter and five sons.

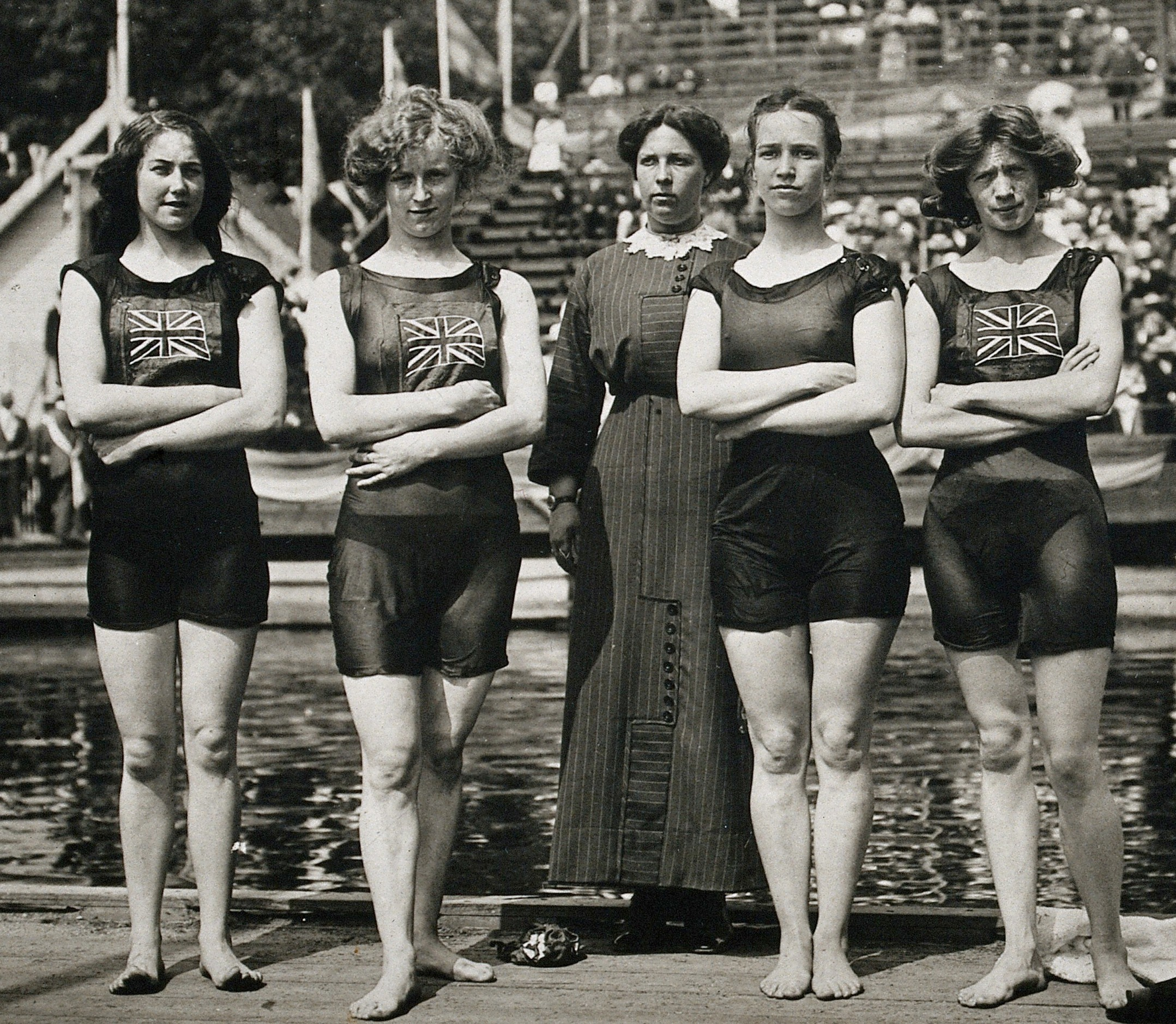
Belle Moore, Jennie Fletcher, Annie Speirs, and Irene Steer at the 1912 Olympics

== See also ==
- List of members of the International Swimming Hall of Fame
- List of Olympic medalists in swimming (women)
- World record progression 4 × 100 metres freestyle relay
