= Fanny Durack =

Australian swimmer (1889–1956)

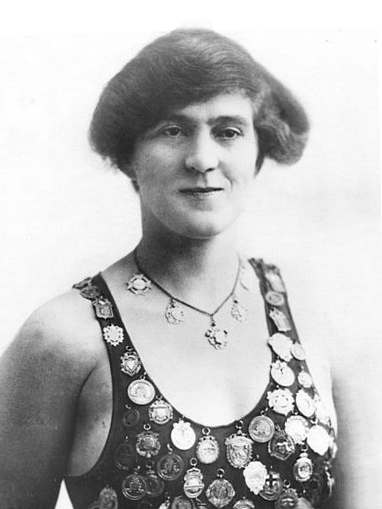

Personal information
- Full name: Sarah Frances Durack
- Born: 27 October 1889 Sydney, Australia
- Died: 20 March 1956 (aged 66) Sydney

Sport
- Sport: Swimming
- Strokes: Breaststroke, freestyle
Medal record
Women's swimming
Representing Australasia
Olympic Games
Gold medal – first place	1912 Stockholm	100 m freestyle

Sarah Frances "Fanny" Gately (née Durack; 27 October 1889 – 20 March 1956) was an Australian competition swimmer. From 1910 until 1918 she was the world's greatest female swimmer across all distances from freestyle sprints to the mile marathon.

== Life and career ==
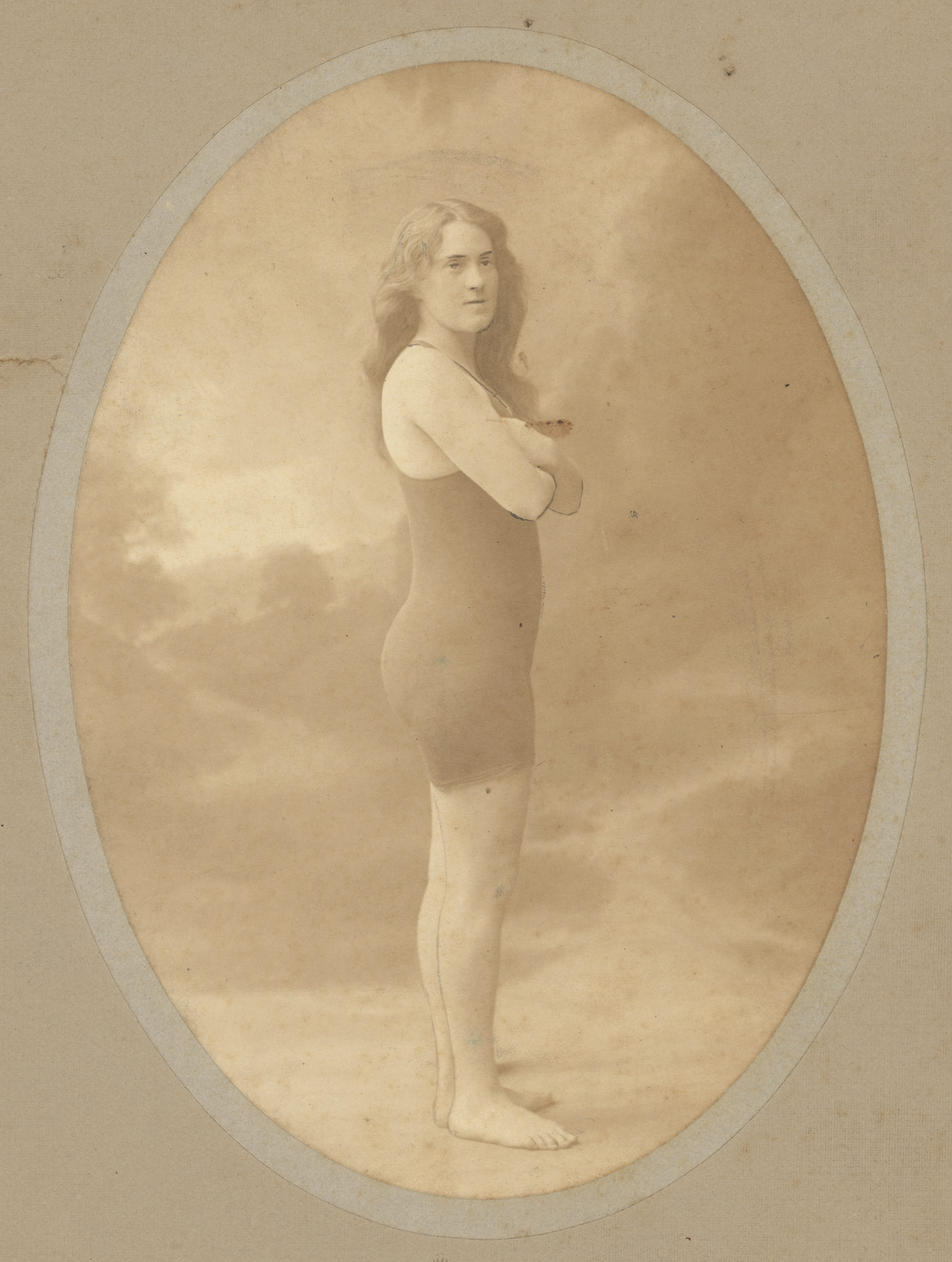
Fanny Durack, Stockholm Olympics, 1912

Durack learned to swim in Sydney's Coogee Baths in the Eastern Suburbs using breaststroke, the only style for which there was a championship for women at that time. In 1906 she won her first title, and over the next few years, dominated the Australian swimming scene. In the 1910–11 swimming season, Mina Wylie beat Durack in the 100-yard breaststroke and the 100- and 220-yard freestyle at the Australian Swimming Championships at Rose Bay. The two went on to become close friends.

From late 1912 to 1920, Durack held the official women's Freestyle swimming world record for 100 metres. She also held the 200M freestyle record from 1915 to 1921. Other world records held included 220 yards freestyle (1915 to 1921), 500M freestyle (1916 to 1917) and 1 mile freestyle (1914 to 1926). She also held many Australian and State records.

The New South Wales Ladies Swimming Association initially was opposed to women participating in the Olympic Games. The 1912 Summer Olympics in Stockholm was to be the first Olympics to have women's swimming. Durack and Wylie were initially refused permission by NSWLSA to compete, but later they were allowed to go provided they bore their own expenses. They organised local fundraising to raise the funds for themselves as well as for the obligatory chaperones. Durack set a new world record in the heats of the 100-metre freestyle. She won the final, becoming the first Australian woman to win an Olympic gold medal in a swimming event. Until the 1932 Olympics (when Clare Dennis won the 200-metre breaststroke in Los Angeles) she was the only such woman; and until the 1956 Olympics she and Dennis were the only two such women.

A week before the Australian team left for the 1920 Antwerp Olympics, in May 1920, Durack suffered appendicitis and had an emergency appendectomy. This was followed by typhoid fever and pneumonia and she was unable to participate in the Olympic team.

During World War I, The Golden Virgin statue of Mary and the infant Jesus on top of the Basilique Notre-Dame de Brebières in Albert, Somme, France, was hit by a shell on 15 January 1915, and slumped to a near-horizontal position. Australian troops nicknamed the leaning statue "Fanny", in honour of Fanny Durack as it resembled the swimmer diving off the blocks.

== Death and legacy ==
Durack died in Sydney in 1956. She was interred in Waverley Cemetery, together with her late husband Bernard Martin Gately. Fanny Durack Aquatic Centre in Petersham, Sydney, is named in her honour.

She was posthumously inducted into the International Swimming Hall of Fame as an "Honour Swimmer" in 1967. In addition to this, she was inducted onto the Victorian Honour Roll of Women in 2001.

Sarah Durack Ave at Sydney Olympic Park in Sydney is named in honour of her.

In 2022, she was an inaugural inductee of the Swimming Australia Hall of Fame.

== Gallery ==
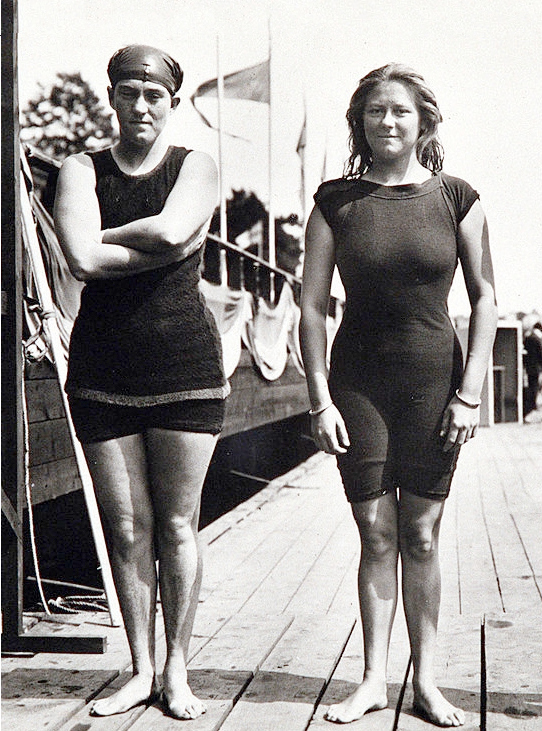
Fanny Durack (left) and Mina Wylie at the 1912 Olympics

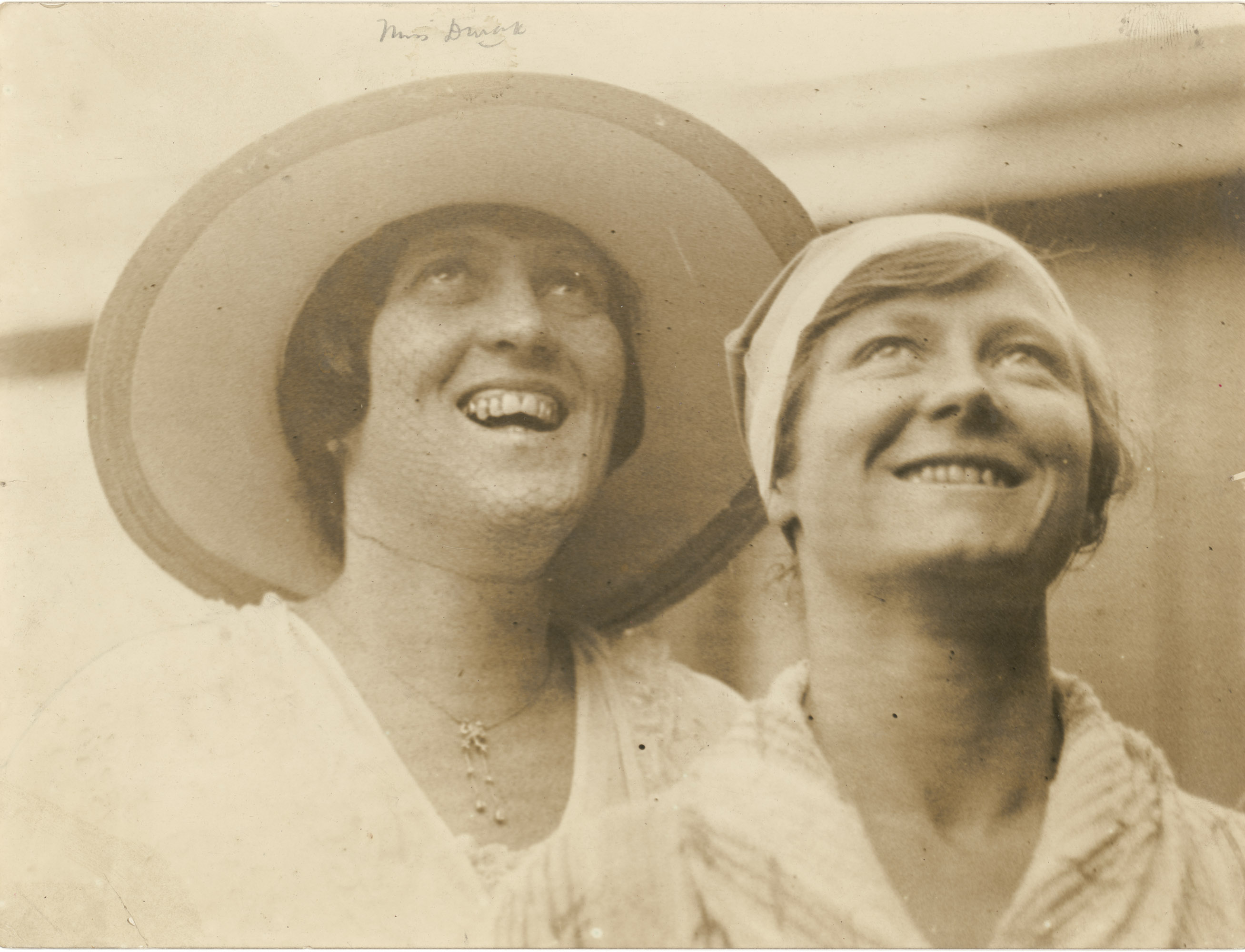
Fanny Durack 03 State Library of New South Wales a468006u

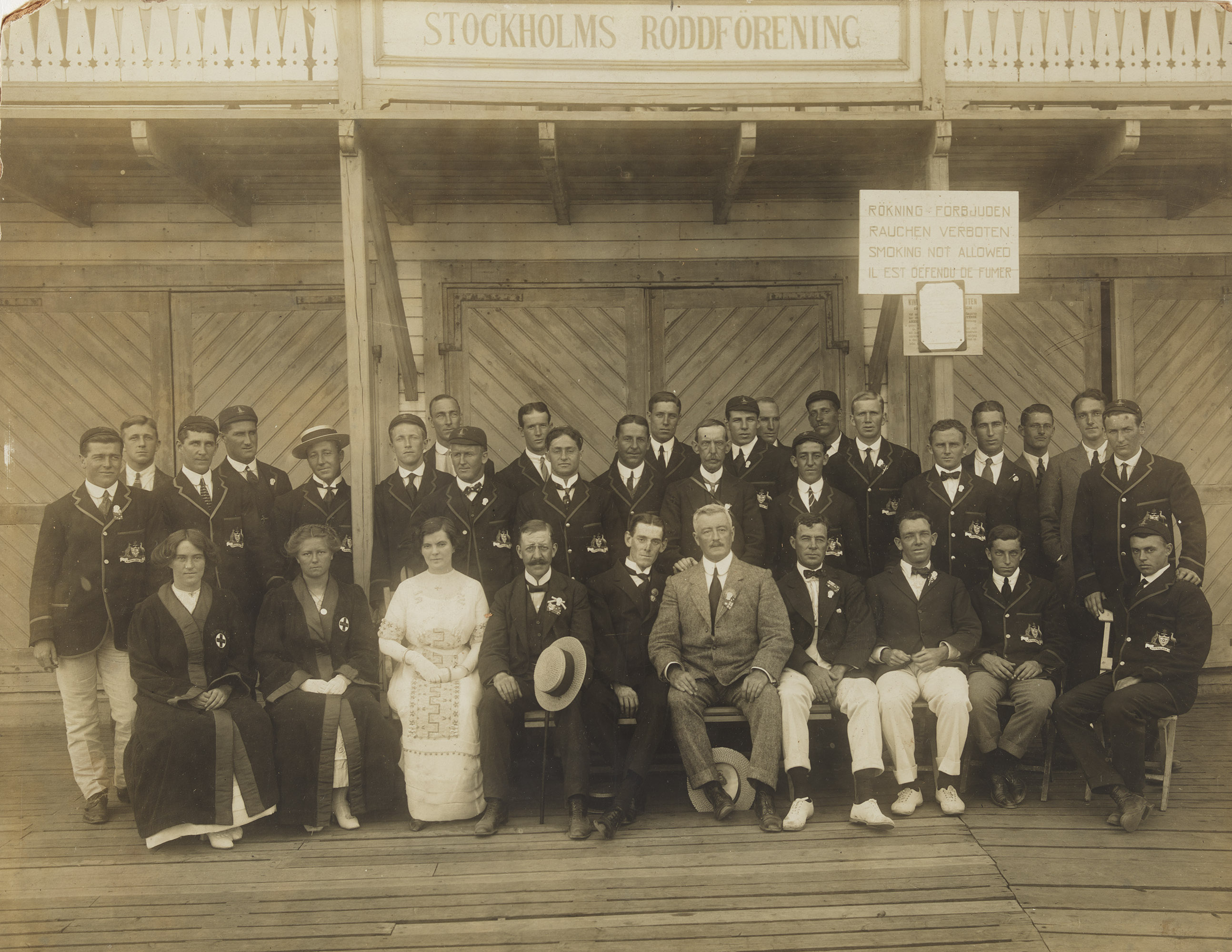
Fanny Durack 02 State Library of New South Wales a5614001u

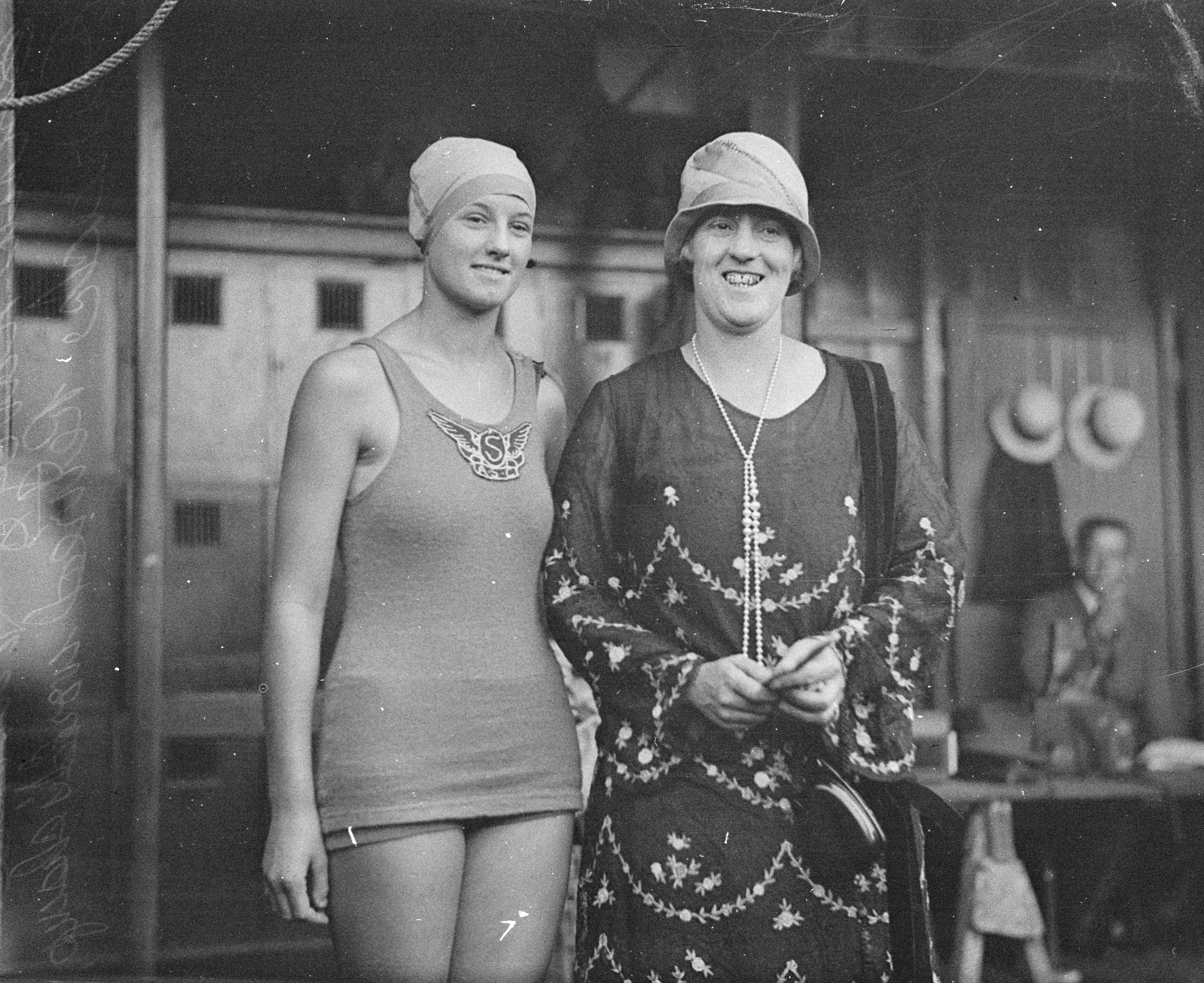
Fanny Durack State Library of New South Wales Hood 30001u

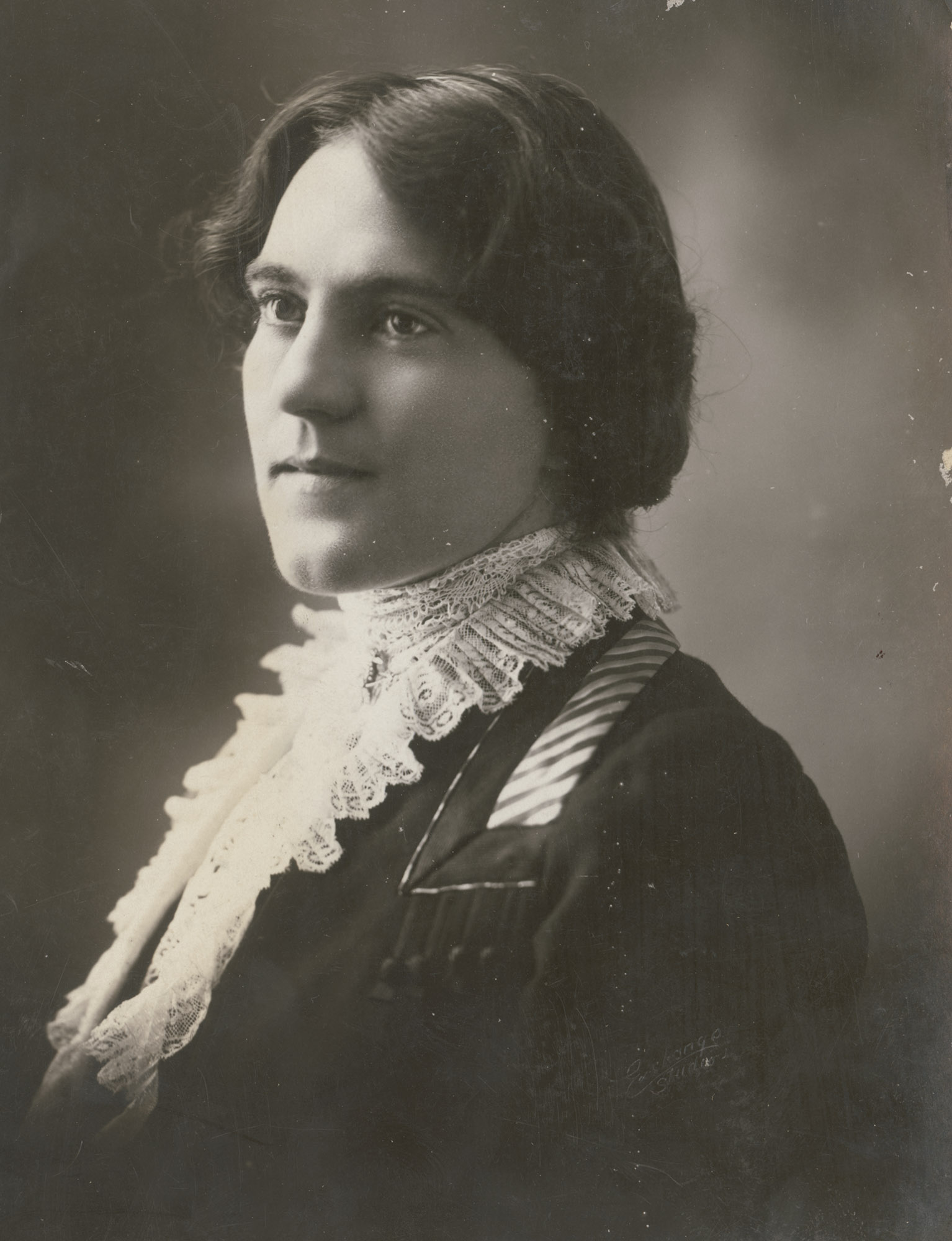
Fanny Durack 05 State Library of New South Wales a466001u

== Records ==
=== Olympic records ===
- 1912 gold (100m freestyle)

=== World records ===
- 100-yard freestyle (1912 to 1921)
- 100-metre freestyle (1912 to 1920)
- 220-yard freestyle (1915 to 1921)
- 500-metre freestyle (1916 to 1917)
- mile (1914 to 1926)

== See also ==
- List of members of the International Swimming Hall of Fame
- List of Olympic medalists in swimming (women)
- World record progression 100 metres freestyle
- World record progression 200 metres freestyle

== Bibliography ==
- FitzSimons, Peter (2006). Great Australian Sports Champions. Harper Collins Publishers. ISBN 0-7322-8517-8.
- David Wallechinsky, The Complete Book of the Summer Olympics, Little, Brown and Company (1996)

Records
Preceded by Daisy Curwen	Women's 100 m freestyle world record-holder (long course); 9 July 1912 – 23 August 1920	Succeeded by Ethelda Bleibtrey
