= Hermine Stindt =

German swimmer (1888–1974)

Personal information
- Born: January 3, 1888 Bremen, German Empire
- Died: February 19, 1974 (aged 86) Hanover, West Germany

Sport
- Sport: Swimming
Medal record
Representing Germany
Olympic Games
Silver medal – second place	1912 Stockholm	4x100 m freestyle relay

Hermine Stindt (January 3, 1888 – February 19, 1974) was a German freestyle swimmer, who competed in the 1912 Summer Olympics. She won a silver medal in relay together with her teammates Grete Rosenberg, Louise Otto and Wally Dressel. In the 100 metre freestyle competition she was eliminated in the first round.
