= Louise Otto =

German freestyle swimmer

Personal information
- Born: August 30, 1896 Hamburg, German Empire
- Died: March 9, 1975 (aged 78) Hamburg, West Germany

Sport
- Sport: Swimming
Medal record
Representing Germany
Olympic Games
Silver medal – second place	1912 Stockholm	4x100m freestyle relay

Louise Otto (August 30, 1896 – March 9, 1975) was a German freestyle swimmer, who competed in the 1912 Summer Olympics. She was born in Hamburg, Germany. She won a silver medal in the relay together with her teammates Grete Rosenberg, Wally Dressel and Hermine Stindt. Additionally, in the Women's 100 metre freestyle, she competed and was eliminated in the semi-finals.
