= Aagot Norman =

Norwegian swimmer

Personal information
- Born: July 29, 1892 Bergen, Norway
- Died: February 22, 1979 (aged 86) Bergen, Norway

Sport
- Sport: Swimming

Aagot Norman (29 July 1892 – 22 February 1979) was a Norwegian swimmer. She set two Norwegian records in 100m freestyle at the short course and attended the 100m freestyle during the 1912 Summer Olympics. This was the first time swimming was on the program for women. She did not finish during the first round.

== Norwegian national records by Aagot Norman ==
Event	Result	Date	Location
100m freestyle	1.46,2	1 September 1912	NOR Bergen
100m freestyle	1.49,2	30 July 1911	NOR Bergen
