= Grete Rosenberg =

German swimmer

Personal information
- Born: October 7, 1896 Hanover, German Empire
- Died: February 5, 1979 (aged 82) Hildesheim, West Germany

Sport
- Sport: Swimming
Medal record
Representing Germany
Olympic Games
Silver medal – second place	1912 Stockholm	4x100 m freestyle relay

Margareta "Grete" Rosenberg (October 7, 1896 – February 5, 1979) was a German freestyle swimmer, who competed in the 1912 Summer Olympics. She won a silver medal in the relay together with her teammates Wally Dressel, Louise Otto and Hermine Stindt. She finished fourth in the 100 metre freestyle competition.
