= Annie Speirs =

British swimmer

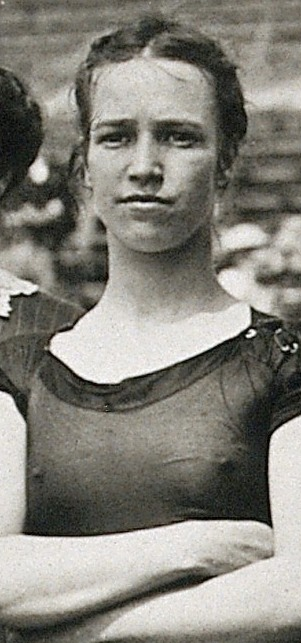
- Speirs in 1912

Personal information
- Full name: Annie Coupe Speirs
- Born: 14 July 1889 Liverpool, England
- Died: 26 October 1926 (aged 37) Liverpool, England

Sport
- Sport: Swimming
- Club: Liverpool Ladies SC
Medal record
Representing Great Britain
Olympic Games
Gold medal – first place	1912 Stockholm	4×100 m freestyle

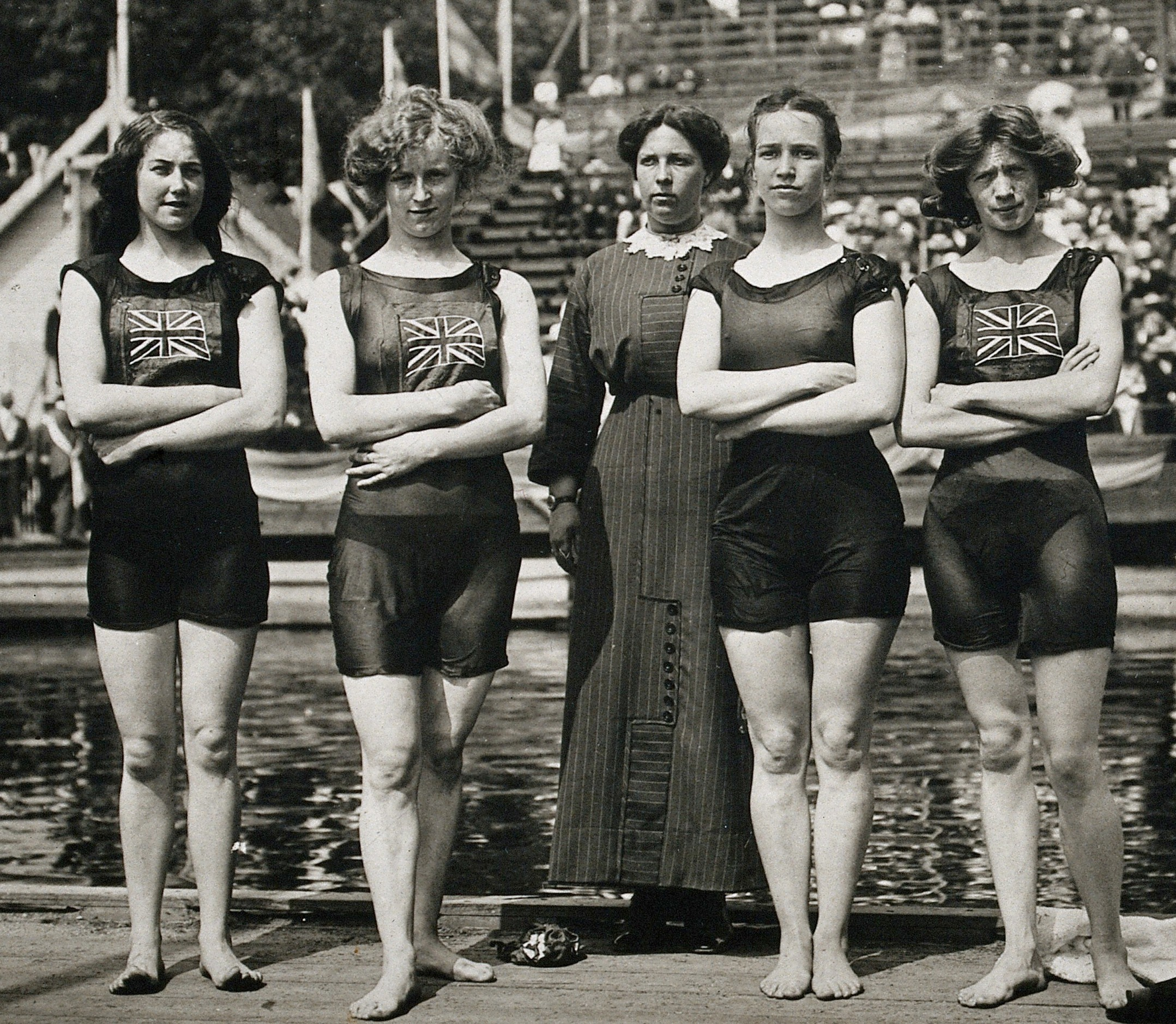
Belle Moore, Jennie Fletcher, Annie Speirs, and Irene Steer at the 1912 Olympics

Annie Coupe Speirs (14 July 1889 – 26 October 1926), also known by her married name Annie Coombe, was a British competition swimmer who won a gold medal in the women's 4×100-metre freestyle relay at the 1912 Summer Olympics in Stockholm, Sweden. Individually, she finished fifth in the women's 100-metre freestyle event.

== See also ==
- List of Olympic medalists in swimming (women)
- World record progression 4 × 100 metres freestyle relay
