= Mina Wylie =

Australian swimmer and Olympic athlete

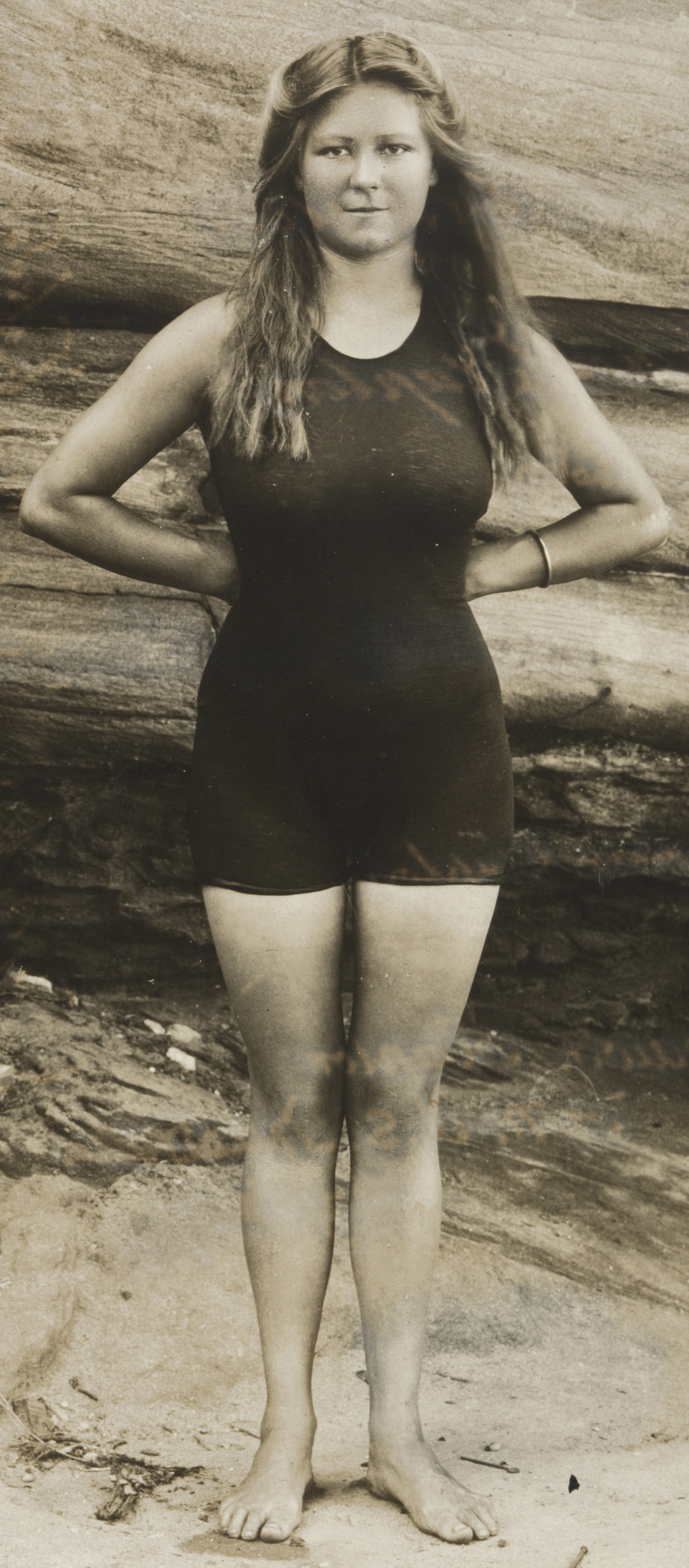
- Wylie in 1913

Personal information
- Full name: Wilhelmina Wylie
- Nationality: Australian
- Born: 27 June 1891 North Sydney, New South Wales
- Died: 6 July 1984 (aged 93) Sydney

Sport
- Sport: Swimming
- Strokes: Freestyle, breaststroke, backstroke
Medal record
Women's swimming
Representing Australasia
Olympic Games
| Silver medal – second place | 1912 Stockholm | 100 m freestyle |

Wilhelmina "Mina" Wylie (27 June 1891 – 6 July 1984) was one of Australia's first two female Olympic swimming representatives, along with friend Fanny Durack.

== Early life ==
Wylie grew up in South Coogee, in the South-Eastern Suburbs of Sydney, where her father Henry Wylie built Wylie's Baths in 1907. The Baths are the oldest surviving communal sea baths in Australia.

== Career ==
After competing against each other in the Australian and New South Wales Swimming Championships during the 1910/11 swimming season, Wylie and Durack persuaded officials to let them attend the 1912 Summer Olympics in Stockholm, Sweden, where women's swimming events were being held for the first time. Durack won a gold medal, and Wylie a silver medal. Twenty-seven women contested the 100-metre event, including six from Great Britain and four from Germany. Swimsuits generally reached down to the mid-thigh, although some were sleeveless. The pool was built in an inlet of Stockholm Harbour, and competitors swam without lane ropes. Durack's time in the 100-metre final was 1:22.2, and Wylie's was 1:25.4.

Wylie competed in New South Wales and Australian championships from 1906 to 1934, winning 115 titles, including every Australian and New South Wales championship event in 1911, 1922 and 1924 in freestyle, backstroke and breaststroke. She was inducted into the International Swimming Hall of Fame in 1975.

On 27 June 2021, to celebrate what would have been her 130th birthday, Wylie was honoured with a Google Doodle for Australian users.

== See also ==
- List of members of the International Swimming Hall of Fame
- List of Olympic medalists in swimming (women)
