= Belle Moore =

Scottish swimmer

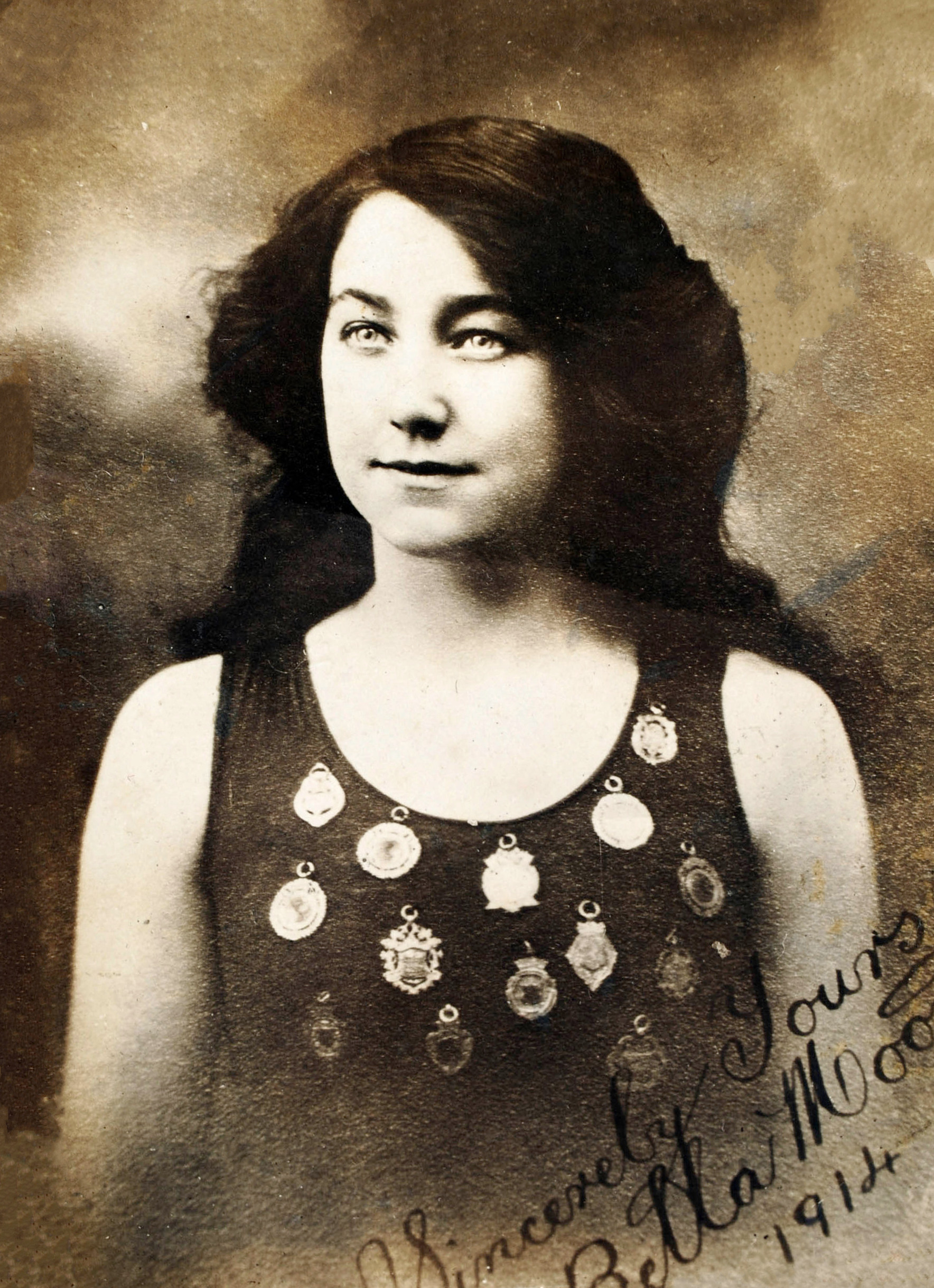
- Moore in 1914

Personal information
- Full name: Isabella McAlpine Moore
- Nickname: Belle
- National team: Great Britain
- Born: 23 October 1894 Glasgow, Scotland, United Kingdom
- Died: 7 March 1975 (aged 80) Baltimore, Maryland, United States

Sport
- Sport: Swimming
- Strokes: Freestyle
- Club: Premier Club
Medal record
Women's swimming
Representing Great Britain
Olympic Games
Gold medal – first place	1912 Stockholm	4×100 m freestyle

Isabella "Belle" McAlpine Moore (23 October 1894 – 7 March 1975), later known by her married name Belle Cameron, was a Scottish competitive swimmer who represented Great Britain in the Olympics.

At the 1912 Summer Olympics in Stockholm, Sweden, Moore won a gold medal as a member of the first-place British women's team in the 4×100-metre freestyle relay, together with teammates Jennie Fletcher, Annie Speirs and Irene Steer. The British women set a new world record in the event of 5:52.8, beating the German and Austrian women's relay teams by a wide margin. Swedish King Gustav V presented Moore and her teammates with their gold medals and Olympic laurels.

Moore was trained as a longer-distance swimmer, but only 100-metre swimming events were available for women at the 1912 Olympics; she was eliminated in the semi-finals of the women's 100-metre freestyle. At 17 years and 226 days old, she remains the youngest British woman to win an Olympic gold medal; she was also the only Scottish woman to win an Olympic gold medal in swimming until the 2020 Tokyo Olympics when Kathleen Dawson also won gold in the mixed 4 x 100 medley relay.

Moore was born the eighth child of nine in her family. She started training at an early age and was a member of the Glasgow Premier Ladies Swimming Club, which trained at Govanhill Baths. Another member was Scotland's first world swimming champion, Etta Mackay.

By the age of 17, Moore already worked as a swimming instructor. In 1919, she married George Cameron, a naval architect; together, they moved to Maryland, United States, where Moore gave birth to a daughter, Doris, and son, George. She spent the rest of her life in Maryland where she taught swimming to thousands of children. She was posthumously inducted into the International Swimming Hall of Fame as an "Honor Pioneer Swimmer" in 1989.

== See also ==
- List of members of the International Swimming Hall of Fame
- List of Olympic medalists in swimming (women)
- World record progression 4 × 100 metres freestyle relay
