= Josephine Sticker =

Austrian swimmer

Personal information
- Nickname: "Fini"
- National team: Austria
- Born: July 7, 1894 Vienna, Austria-Hungary
- Died: September 10, 1963 (aged 69) Vienna, Austria

Sport
- Sport: Swimming
- Strokes: Freestyle
- Club: Wien Club, Vienna
- Coach: Otto Scheff (1912 Olympics)
Medal record
Representing Austria
Olympic Games
Bronze medal – third place	1912 Stockholm	4×100 m freestyle

Josephine "Fini" Sticker (July 7, 1894 – September 10, 1963) was an Austrian freestyle swimmer, born in Vienna, who competed in the 1912 Summer Olympics.

Sticker was born July 7, 1894 into a Jewish family in Vienna, Austria-Hungary, and swam for the Wien Club in Viena, known officially as Damenschwimmklub.

== 1912 Stockholm Olympics ==
The 1912 Olympics were the first Olympics where woman were allowed to compete. The Austrian women's team were trained for the 1912 Olympics by attorney and former swimmer Otto Scheff, a 1907 World Champion, and holder of a bronze medal in the 1908 London Olympics. Sticker won the bronze medal in the 4×100 m freestyle relay event on July 15, 1912 becoming one of the first Austrian women to win an Olympic medal. Sticker swam the third leg of the relay with her teammates Margarete Adler, Klara Milch and Berta Zahourek. Both Adler and Milch were also considered by a few sources to be of the Jewish faith. The team from Great Britain took the gold medal with a combined time of 5:52.8, and the German team took the Silver with a combined time of 6:04.6.

Sticker also participated in the 100 metre freestyle competition, swimming a time of 1:31.8 finishing fourth in the third preliminary heat and did not advance to the semi-finals. Australian Fanny Durack took the gold with a 1:22.2, and Australian Mina Wylie took the silver with a time of 1:25.4.

Sticker died at 69 on September 10, 1963 in Vienna, Austria.

== See also ==
- List of select Jewish swimmers
