= Swimming at the 1912 Summer Olympics – Women's 4 × 100 metre freestyle relay =

Women's 4 × 100 metre freestyle relay at the Games of the V Olympiad
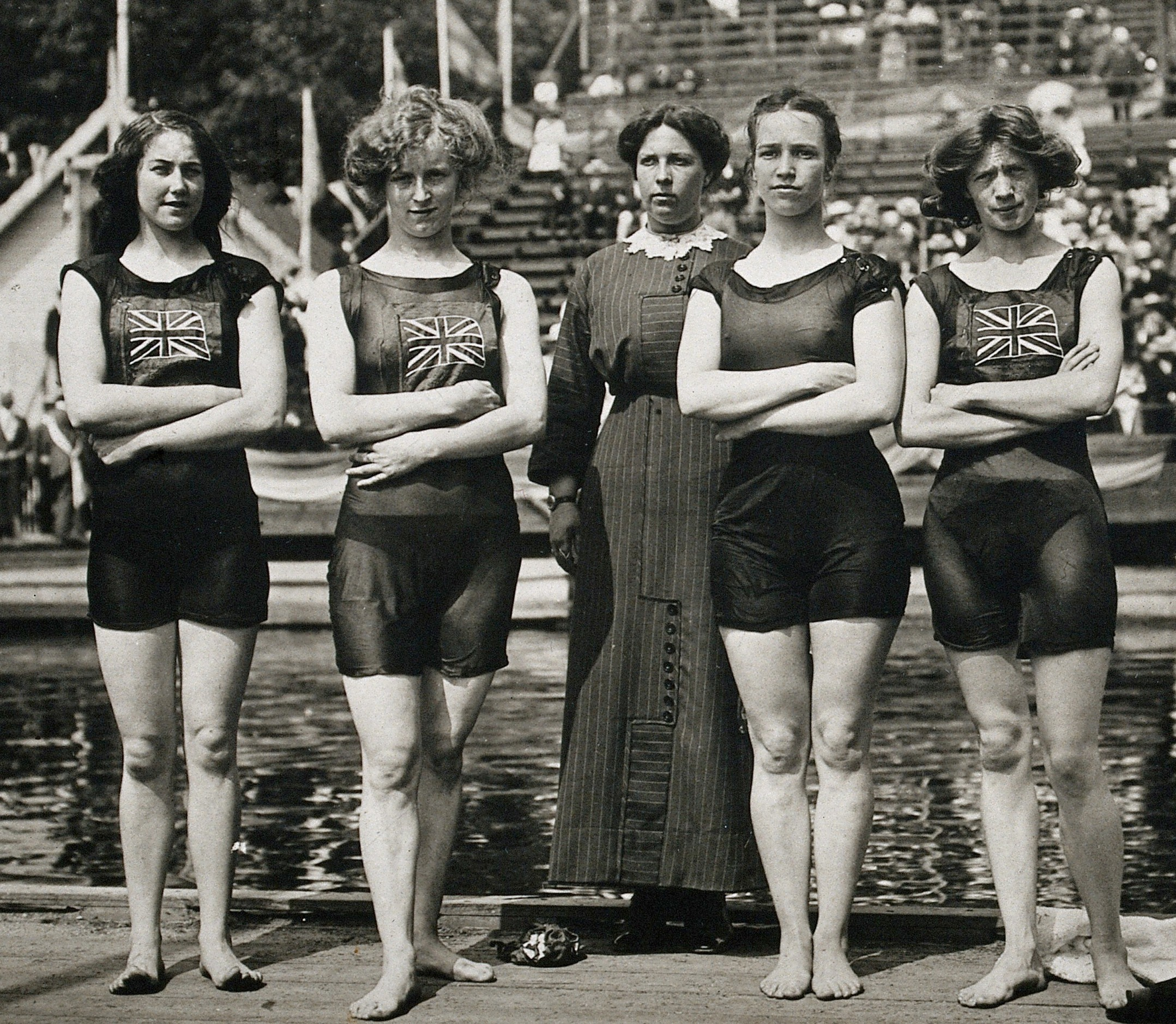
- Belle Moore, Jennie Fletcher, Annie Speirs and Irene Steer at the 1912 Olympics
- Venue: Djurgårdsbrunnsviken
- Date: 15 July 1912
- Competitors: 16 from 4 nations
- Teams: 16
- Winning time: 5:52.8 WR

Medalists
1st place, gold medalist(s)		Belle Moore, Jennie Fletcher, Annie Speirs, Irene Steer; Great Britain
2nd place, silver medalist(s)		Wally Dressel, Louise Otto, Hermine Stindt, Grete Rosenberg; Germany
3rd place, bronze medalist(s)		Margarete Adler, Klara Milch, Josephine Sticker, Berta Zahourek; Austria

The women's 4 × 100 metre freestyle relay was a swimming event held as part of the swimming at the 1912 Summer Olympics programme. It was the first appearance of the event, which along with the individual 100 metre freestyle marked the debut of women's Olympic swimming on 15 July 1912.

Four teams entered the event: Australasia, whose swimmers finished first and second in the individual 100m freestyle, did not have any other women present to make a relay team, and a request for their swimmers to swim two legs each was rejected.

Great Britain, with two of the individual finalists, won the gold. Germany took silver and Austria won bronze over the host Swedes. The competition was held on Monday July 15, 1912.

Sixteen swimmers from four nations competed.

== Records ==
There were no standing world and Olympic records (in minutes) prior to the 1912 Summer Olympics.

World record	-	none	-	-
Olympic record	-	none	-	-

Therefore, the time set by the British team was also the first official world record.

== Results ==
=== Final ===
Place	Swimmers	Time
1	Belle Moore, Jennie Fletcher, Annie Speirs, Irene Steer (GBR)	5:52.8 WR
2	Wally Dressel, Louise Otto, Hermine Stindt, Grete Rosenberg (GER)	6:04.6
3	Margarete Adler, Klara Milch, Josephine Sticker, Berta Zahourek (AUT)	6:17.0
4	Greta Carlsson, Greta Johansson, Sonja Johnsson, Vera Thulin (SWE)	
