= Vera Thulin =

Swedish swimmer

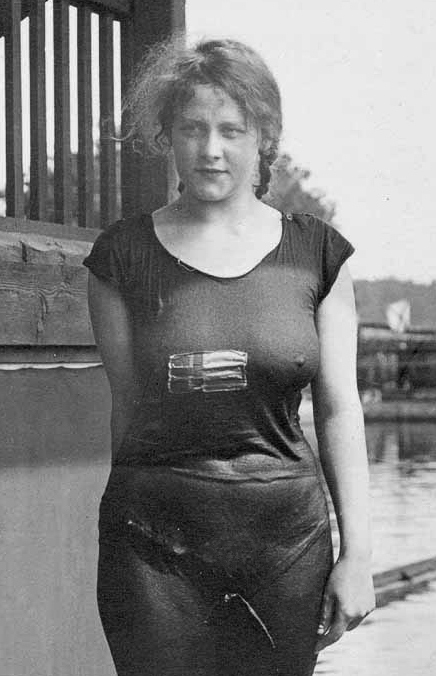

Personal information
- Full name: Vera Julia Thulin-Mirsky
- Nationality: Swedish
- Born: 7 June 1893 Uppsala, Uppland
- Died: 9 April 1974 (aged 80) Stockholm

Sport
- Sport: Swimming
- Strokes: Freestyle
- Club: Stockholms KK

Vera Julia Thulin (later Mirsky, 7 June 1893 – 9 April 1974) was a Swedish freestyle swimmer who competed in the 1912 Summer Olympics. She was eliminated in the first round of the 100 m event and finished fourth with the Swedish 4 × 100 m relay team. Her older sister Willy competed in diving at the same Olympics.

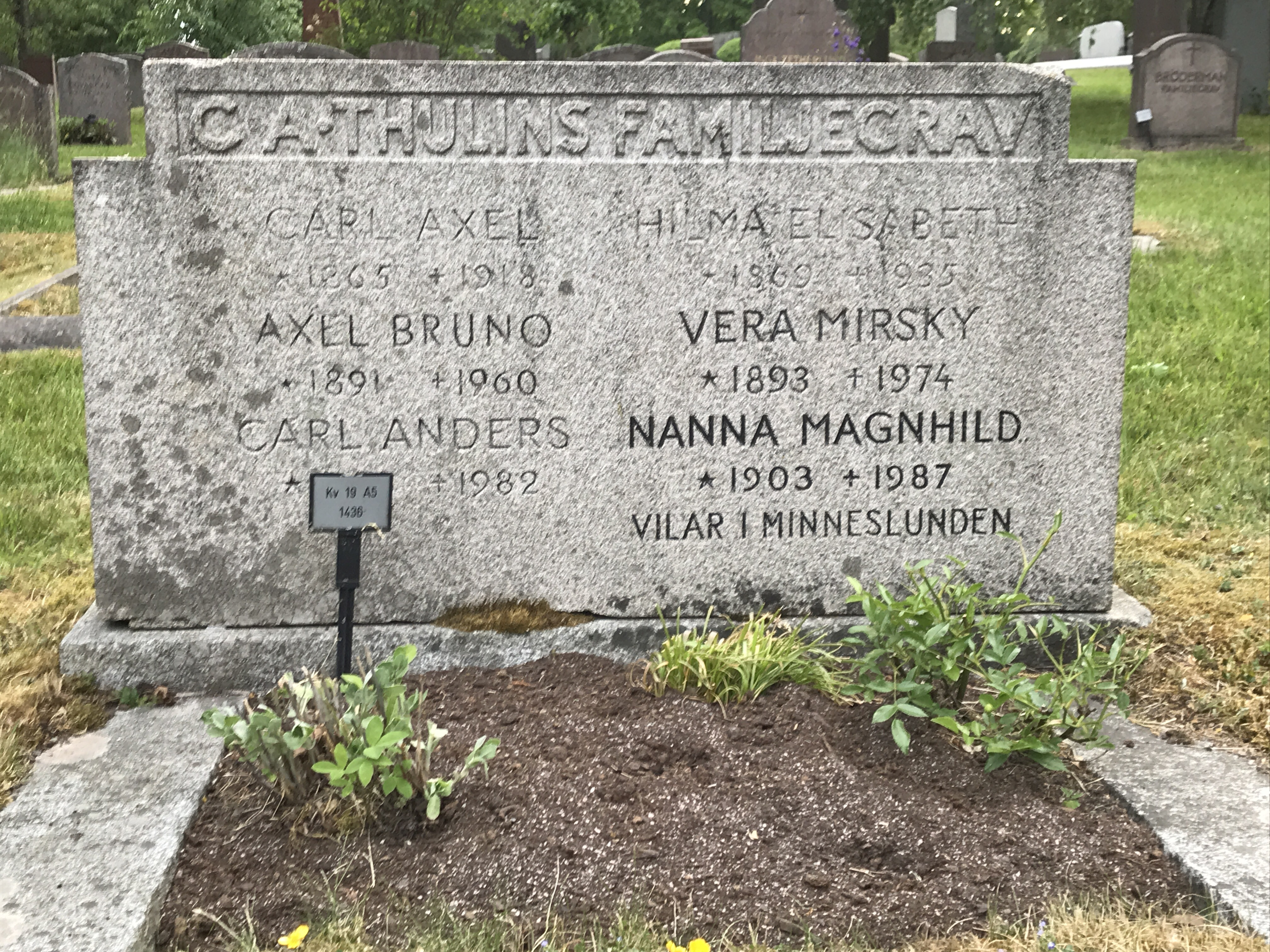
Vera Thulin's (Mirsky) grave.
