= Waltraud Dressel =

German swimmer

Personal information
- Born: June 3, 1893 Magdeburg, German Empire
- Died: June 10, 1940 (aged 47) Magdeburg, Germany

Sport
- Sport: Swimming
Medal record
Representing Germany
Olympic Games
Silver medal – second place	1912 Stockholm	4x100 m freestyle relay

Wally Dressel (June 3, 1893 – June 10, 1940) was a German freestyle swimmer, who competed in the 1912 Summer Olympics. She won a silver medal in the relay together with her teammates Grete Rosenberg, Louise Otto and Hermine Stindt. In the 100 metre freestyle competition, she was eliminated in the semi-finals.
