= Margarete Adler =

Austrian sportswoman

- Adler circa 1912

Personal information
- Nickname: Grete
- National team: Austria
- Born: 13 February 1896 Vienna, Austria-Hungary
- Died: 22 April 1990 (aged 94) Vienna, Austria-Hungary
- Spouse: Josef Pfundner

Sport
- Sport: Swimming
- Event(s): 100, 300, 400-meter freestyle Platform diving
- Strokes: freestyle
- Club: Wiener Damen-Schwimmklub Austria
- Coach: Otto Scheff (Olympics)
Medal record
Representing Austria
Olympic Games
Bronze medal – third place	1912 Stockholm	4×100 m freestyle

Margarete "Grete" Adler (13 February 1896 – 22 April 1990) was an Austrian freestyle swimmer, diver, and gymnastics teacher, who represented Wiener Damen-Schwimmklub, and participated in the Stockholm 1912 and Paris 1924 Summer Olympics. She was Jewish, and was born in Vienna.

== Biography ==
=== Early life and swimming ===
Adler was born February 13, 1896, in Viena, Austria to Maria Eleonore Adele Müller Adler and Gustav Adler (1869–1958). Her father Gustav was a police doctor, educational reformer, and sports official. Adler began swimming around the age of seven in Vienna's Margaretenbad, a local public bath. By the age of nine, she won her first swimming competition, and in December 1907, first competed in platform diving, and Junior gymnastics. By the age of eleven, she had begun to use the modern Australian crawl. She soon began winning breaststroke and backstroke events. Prior to WWI, she gained recognition as one of the leading swimmers in Austria, with Klara Milch, Berta Zahourek, Johanna, and Josefine Kellner and Josephine Sticker.

Austria's 1912 women's Olympic swim team was trained by attorney and former swimmer Otto Scheff, a 1907 World Champion, and holder of a bronze medal in the 1908 London Olympics. As she progressed, Adler trained with the Wiener Damen-Schwimmklub founded in 1894, also known as Schwimmvereinigung "Austria".

=== Swimming highlights ===
As noted in the table below, Adler captured the 100-freestyle National Championship of Austria in 1915, and from 1921 to 1924. She was Austria's 300-meter freestyle champion in 1915, 1916, 1918, and 1921. She also held the Austrian championship in the 400-meter freestyle from 1922 to 1924. Versatile in multiple areas of pool competition, in 1915, she was the Austrian diving champion as well.

=== 1912 Stockholm Olympics ===
Adler won the bronze medal in the 4×100 metre freestyle relay event, becoming the first Austrian woman to win an Olympic medal together with her teammates Klara Milch, Josephine Sticker and Berta Zahourek. Adler swam the leadoff leg of the relay. Both Sticker and Milch were also considered by a few sources to be of the Jewish faith. The team from Great Britain took the gold medal with a combined time of 5:52.8, and the German team took the Silver with a combined time of 6:04.6. The success of the Austrian women's team greatly increased the number of Austrian women participating in the sport of swimming and competitive swimming. At the age of 16 years and 152 days, she was the youngest female Austrian Summer Olympian to win a medal.

At the 1912 Olympics, Adler also competed in the 100-meter freestyle, but swam a time of 1:34.4 placing fourth in the fourth preliminary heat on July 9, 1912, and did not qualify for the finals.

=== Marriage ===
Adler was married to Josef Pfundner Jr. (Vienna, May 31, 1902-Vienna, October 15, 1983). Josef Pfunder Jr. took over operation of Vienna's Pfunder Bell Foundry in 1936 from his father Josef Pfunder Sr., and when the foundry closed in 1971, he continued to work in the area of bell research. The foundry, which formerly did metal casting, began producing bells after WWI. Josef's son Martin Pfunder converted the foundry to a bell museum after 1971. During WWII the foundry performed medal casting due to a shortage of raw materials, but returned to producing bells after 1945.

=== Post WWI swimming ===
At the 1915 War Championships, the largest meet subsequent to WWI, Adler captured three championships in one day, winning both the 100 and 300 meter freestyle events, as well as a gymnastics competition. In 1915, she also secured the national diving title, and in 1916 once again won the national championship in the 300-meter freestyle. In June 1918, she won the women's 200 m primary swim in 3:28 in Dianabad, also taking first in the 300-meter breaststroke with a time of 5:40.4.

=== 1924 Paris Olympics ===
At the 1924 Olympics in Paris she competed in the 10 metre platform diving event, finishing fourth in her heat. In 1924, the event was called plain high diving, but was basically a platform diving competition, held on both the 5-metre and 10-metre platforms. The event required four dives in each round by each competitor, with two compulsory dives and two optional. After 1928, the event would be named platform diving. Adler placed fourth in Round 2, but was required to place in the top three, to qualify for the final, and ending her Olympic career.

=== Post-swimming career ===
In 1926, Adler became the European champion in artistic diving. After 1926, she retired from competitive swimming, and taught gymnastics. Holding the title of professor, she taught at the girls' middle school in Albertgasse in Vienna 8. In her swimming retirement, she focused on the sport of skiing, popular in Vienna. In 1926 she received the Golden Badge of Honour of the Marathon Committee.

Margarethe Pfundner, also known as Margarete Adler Pfunder died on April 22, 1990, in Vienna at 94. Sources give varying death dates, but April 22 is the date provided by the Austrian Centre for Digital Humanities and Cultural Heritage. She was buried in Vienna's Friedhof Hietzing Cemetery as had been her husband Josef earlier in October 1983.

== National Champion ==
- 100 meter freestyle (1915, 1921–24)
- 300 meter freestyle (1915–16, 1918, 1921)
- 400 meter freestyle (1922–24)
- Diving (1915)

== See also ==
- List of select Jewish swimmers
