= Berta Zahourek =

Austrian swimmer

Personal information
- Born: January 3, 1896 Vienna, Austria-Hungary
- Died: June 14, 1967 (aged 71)

Sport
- Sport: Swimming
Medal record
Representing Austria
Olympic Games
Bronze medal – third place	1912 Stockholm	4×100 m freestyle

Berta Zahourek-Blaha (January 3, 1896 – June 14, 1967) was an Austrian freestyle swimmer who competed in the 1912 Summer Olympics.

She won the bronze medal in the 4×100 metre freestyle relay event, becoming the first Austrian woman to win an Olympic medal together with her teammates Margarete Adler, Klara Milch and Josephine Sticker.

She also participated in the 100 metre freestyle competition but was eliminated in the first round.
