= Klara Milch =

Austrian swimmer

Personal information
- Born: May 24, 1891 Smyrna, Ottoman Empire
- Died: July 13, 1970 (aged 79) Multan, Pakistan

Sport
- Sport: Swimming
Medal record
Representing Austria
Olympic Games
Bronze medal – third place	1912 Stockholm	4×100 m freestyle

Klara Milch (May 24, 1891 – July 13, 1970) was an Austrian freestyle swimmer who competed in the 1912 Summer Olympics. She was Jewish. She was the first woman to represent Austria at the Olympics.

She won the bronze medal in the 4×100 metre freestyle relay event, becoming the first Austrian woman to win an Olympic medal together with her teammates Margarete Adler, Josephine Sticker and Berta Zahourek. Milch also participated in the 100 metre freestyle competition but was eliminated in the first round.

== See also ==
- List of select Jewish swimmers
