= Irene Steer =

British swimmer (1889–1977)

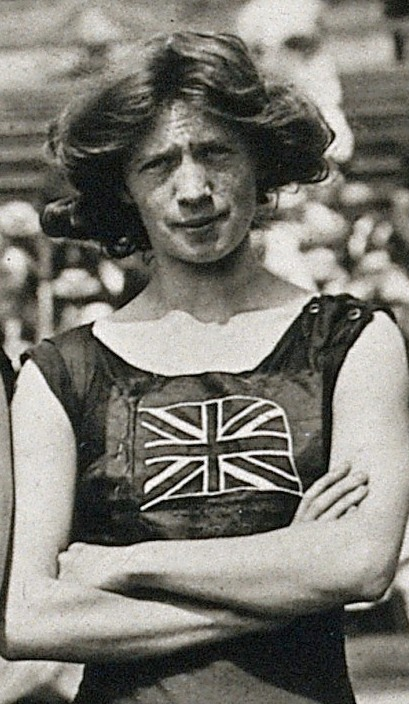
- Steer at 1912 Olympics

Personal information
- Born: 10 August 1889 Cardiff, Wales
- Died: 18 April 1977 (aged 87) Cardiff, Wales

Sport
- Sport: Swimming
- Club: Cardiff Ladies Premier SC
Medal record
Representing Great Britain
Olympic Games
Gold medal – first place	1912 Stockholm	4×100 m freestyle

Irene Steer (10 August 1889 – 18 April 1977) was a Welsh freestyle swimmer. Steer started as a breaststroke swimmer, but in 1908–1909 changed to crawl. From 1907 until 1913, she held the Welsh championship unbeaten every year and was described in reports of the races as a "beautiful", "neat" and the "most graceful swimmer". She held jointly the world record for 100m in 1910, 1912 and 1913.

In 1912, the first year that women were allowed to compete in swimming in the Olympics, Steer won a gold medal in the 4 × 100 m relay, swimming the final, anchor leg, but failed to reach the final of the individual 100 m race. She had had to make her own way to the Olympics venue in Stockholm and was one of the fewer than 50 women among the 2,500 athletes taking part.

After retiring from competitions she married William Nicholson, director and chairman of Cardiff City F.C. They had three daughters and one son.

In September 2025 a Purple Plaque was installed in Roath Park Lake to mark her Olympic swimming achievement.

She is one of only six Welsh women who have won Olympic gold medals before 2026, the others being Nicole Cooke (cycling, 2008), Jade Jones (taekwondo, 2012, 2016), Hannah Mills (sailing 2016, 2020), Elinor Barker (cycling, 2016) and Lauren Price (boxing, 2020).

== See also ==
- List of Olympic medalists in swimming (women)
- World record progression 4 × 100 metres freestyle relay
