= Aladi (name) =

- Gender: Female

Origin
- Origin: Igala
- Meaning: "a new beginning" or "Sunday"
- Region of origin: North-central Nigeria

Aladi is a feminine name of Nigerian origin, commonly used in the North Central region. It means "a new beginning," "the dawn of a new era," or "Sunday."
