= World Aquatics =

International governing body for water sports

- Sport: Swimming; diving; artistic swimming; water polo; open water swimming; high diving
- Jurisdiction: International
- Abbreviation: AQUA (formerly FINA)
- Founded: 19 July 1908; 118 years ago in London, United Kingdom
- Affiliation: Association of Summer Olympic International Federations (ASOIF)
- Headquarters: Lausanne, Switzerland (Note: A phased relocation of the headquarters to Budapest, Hungary, was under way as of 2026; see § Headquarters relocation and recent developments (2023–2026).)
- President: Husain Al-Musallam
- CEO: Brent Nowicki
- Operating income: ▲US$107.8 million (2024)
- Replaced: International Swimming Federation (FINA)

Official website
- www.worldaquatics.com

World Aquatics, known for most of its history as FINA (French: Fédération internationale de natation; English: International Swimming Federation), (Note: The official and original name prior to 2023 was in French.) is the international federation recognised by the International Olympic Committee (IOC) for administering international competition in water sports. Along with bodies such as World Athletics and World Rugby, it is one of the international federations that governs a given sport, or group of disciplines, on behalf of both the IOC and the wider sporting community. It has been headquartered in Lausanne, Switzerland, since 1986, although a phased move to Budapest, Hungary, was under way through the mid-2020s.

Founded on 19 July 1908 in London as FINA, the federation coordinated amateur competition in swimming, diving and water polo before gradually extending its authority to open water swimming, artistic (formerly synchronised) swimming and high diving. It changed its operating name to World Aquatics in January 2023, seven months after its Congress approved the change and a new constitution. The organisation is led by a president and a Bureau elected by a Congress of member federations, and its day-to-day affairs are run by an Executive under a Director. As of the mid-2020s, World Aquatics counted more than 210 national member federations, grouped into five continental associations, making it one of the larger international sport federations recognised by the IOC.

World Aquatics organises the biennial World Aquatics Championships, the sport's flagship event and the largest single gathering of its six disciplines, as well as a calendar of discipline-specific world cups, world series and junior championships, and it sets the competition programme for aquatics events at the Summer Olympics. Since 2021 the federation has been led by Kuwaiti sports administrator Husain Al-Musallam, whose tenure has been marked by a rebranding of the organisation, a new constitution, an overhaul of its finances and prize-money structure, and, at the same time, prolonged antitrust litigation in the United States, disputes over doping enforcement, and debate over its eligibility rules for transgender and intersex athletes.

== History ==
=== Founding and early years (1896–1945) ===
The former FINA logo, used from the 1980s until the 2023 rebrand

Organised international swimming pre-dated FINA by more than a decade, but without a common rulebook. Three swimming races were held at the first modern Olympic Games in 1896, and the swimming programme at the following Games was, by later standards, eccentric: the 1900 Summer Olympics in Paris were contested in the Seine and included events such as an underwater swimming race and a 200-metre obstacle swim, while the 1904 Summer Olympics in St. Louis featured a plunge for distance in a small lake. No international body existed to standardise rules, ratify records, or agree which events belonged on the Olympic programme.

That changed at the 1908 Summer Olympics in London, the first Games held in a purpose-built 100-metre pool. On 19 July 1908, delegates from eight national federations—Belgium, Denmark, Finland, France, Germany, Great Britain, Hungary and Sweden—met for around four-and-a-half hours at the Manchester Hotel in London and agreed to form a "world-wide swimming association". The meeting had been convened, somewhat informally, by George W. Hearn of Britain's Amateur Swimming Association, who later recalled that FINA's creation "came about more by accident than intention" and had originated in a wish to settle disputes over amateurism and compile a reliable list of world records while national delegates were already gathered in London for the Olympics. Hearn served as honorary secretary for the federation's first twenty years, with the first president, Hearn himself in an acting capacity, followed by an elected Bureau from 1924. The founders' stated priorities were to standardise the rules of swimming, diving and water polo; to ratify and maintain a list of world records; and to take charge of the Olympic competitions in those disciplines.

Membership grew steadily in FINA's early decades, reaching 38 national federations by 1928, sixteen years after women's swimming events had first appeared on the Olympic programme. Among the federation's formative figures was German-born swimmer Max Ritter, one of the eight founding delegates in 1908 and later a long-serving honorary secretary and treasurer before his election as FINA president in 1960; under his presidency FINA's membership passed ninety national federations by the 1964 Tokyo Olympics, even though the organisation remained essentially a volunteer body with an annual budget of under US$100,000 and no permanent staff. Competition during this period continued to be organised almost entirely through the Olympic Games and a small number of continental championships, and the two World Wars interrupted the Olympic cycle, and with it FINA's activities, in 1916, 1940 and 1944.

=== Post-war expansion and Cold War politics (1945–1990) ===
FINA's membership and remit expanded considerably in the decades after the Second World War, as decolonisation created new national federations and the Olympic movement itself grew. The federation opened its first permanent office, in Lausanne, Switzerland, in 1986, having previously been run out of the homes and workplaces of its volunteer officers.

The era's defining competition milestone was the inaugural World Championships, staged in Belgrade, Yugoslavia, in September 1973 and contested in swimming, diving, water polo and synchronised swimming. American administrator Hal Henning, FINA's president from 1972 to 1976, was closely involved in establishing the event and in the negotiations that determined the size of the Olympic swimming programme during his term.

The same Belgrade Congress became a flashpoint in the sporting boycott of apartheid South Africa. Meeting delegates voted to expel the all-white South African Amateur Swimming Union (SAASU), which had represented the country in FINA since 1909, after a sustained campaign by anti-apartheid campaigner Morgan Naidoo and the non-racial South African Swimming Federation, whose officials were barred from travelling to the Congress but whose "FINA Memorandum" cataloguing apartheid sport was circulated to delegates by Sam Ramsamy on their behalf. South Africa's swimmers remained excluded from FINA competition, including the Olympics, until the union was dissolved and replaced by a non-racial governing body in the early 1990s following the end of apartheid.

The 1970s and 1980s were also the years in which East Germany built the state-organised doping programme that made its swimmers, and above all its women, dominant in FINA competition; the episode, and FINA's much later reckoning with it, are discussed at § Doping below. The same years produced the sport's first major individual doping controversy at Olympic level, when American Rick DeMont was stripped of his 400-metre freestyle gold medal at the 1972 Summer Olympics after an inhaler prescribed for his asthma was found to contain a then-banned stimulant (see § Doping).

=== Discipline expansion and the "supersuit" era (1991–2018) ===
FINA steadily broadened the World Championships programme in the decades that followed: open water swimming was added in 1991, and a separate short-course (25-metre pool) World Championships was first held in Palma de Mallorca, Spain, in 1993. The federation convened its first World Aquatics Convention, a biennial conference on the business and governance of the sport, in Punta del Este, Uruguay, in 2010, and added high diving to the World Championships programme in 2013. In 2015, FINA staged the World Championships and the World Masters Championships consecutively in the same host city, Kazan, Russia, for the first time, a pairing that has continued at most editions since. Synchronised swimming was rebranded "artistic swimming" in 2017 to reflect an expansion of judging criteria beyond synchronisation to include choreography and artistic impression. FINA marked its 110th anniversary in 2018 by opening a new, larger headquarters building in Lausanne.

The sport's records also passed through a brief but disruptive technological episode in this period. Speedo's full-body LZR Racer swimsuit, introduced in February 2008 and incorporating bonded polyurethane panels for buoyancy and reduced drag, was credited with 23 of the 25 world records set at the 2008 Summer Olympics in Beijing, where swimmers wearing it won a large majority of the medals on offer. Rival manufacturers responded with all-polyurethane suits of their own, and the resulting "arms race" produced 43 world records at the 2009 World Championships in Rome alone, prompting many swimmers and commentators to describe the suits as a form of "technological doping." Having initially tried to regulate the suits by limiting their coverage rather than their material, FINA's Congress reversed course at that same 2009 Rome meeting and voted to ban all non-textile, full-body suits outright, effective from January 2010, restricting men's suits to the area between waist and knee and women's to the area between shoulder and knee. Several records set in the suits, in events such as the men's 50 and 100-metre freestyle, remained unbroken more than a decade later.

=== Governance reform and rebranding (2018–2023) ===
FINA's relationship with the swimmers it governed came under sustained strain from 2018, when the federation moved to block a breakaway professional circuit, the International Swimming League (ISL), from staging an inaugural meet in Turin by threatening to sanction any swimmer who competed in it; the dispute escalated into antitrust litigation in the United States that was not finally resolved until 2026 (see § Governance and antitrust litigation). Partly in response to the ISL's launch, FINA introduced its own short-lived Champions Swim Series in 2019, offering the highest prize purse the sport had then seen.

Husain Al-Musallam of Kuwait, who had served as FINA's first vice-president since 2015, was elected president in June 2021, becoming the first Asian administrator to lead the federation. His presidency began with a series of governance reforms, including the creation of an independent Aquatics Integrity Unit to handle disciplinary, ethics and anti-doping matters at arm's length from the elected leadership, a revised code of ethics, and an increase in the minimum representation of women on the Bureau. As part of a wider push to confront the federation's own history with doping, the Bureau voted in November 2021 to strip Lothar Kipke, the East German team doctor who had orchestrated systematic steroid use among his swimmers in the 1970s and 1980s, of an honour FINA had given him in the 1980s (see § Doping).

The federation's most visible change came on 12 December 2022, when an Extraordinary Congress in Melbourne approved a new constitution and voted to rename the organisation World Aquatics, with the new identity taking effect the following month. Officials presented the rebrand as part of a wider modernisation, alongside reforms to the governing structure, an enlarged and more gender-balanced Bureau, and a lengthened eight-year presidential term (renewable for a further four years) intended to mirror the term structure used by the IOC. Al-Musallam was re-elected under the new rules in July 2023.

=== Headquarters relocation and recent developments (2023–2026) ===
In May 2023, World Aquatics signed an agreement with the Hungarian government to relocate its headquarters from Lausanne to Budapest, a city that had already hosted the 2017 and 2022 World Championships; the move required unanimous approval from the Congress to take legal effect. The General Congress gave its approval in July 2023, and construction of a purpose-built headquarters in Budapest's 13th district began in October 2025, with World Aquatics stating the building was expected to be complete by the end of 2026 and an interim Budapest office opening in November 2024 ahead of a full transfer by 2027.

The federation's most recent World Championships were held in Fukuoka (2023), Doha (2024) and Singapore (2025), the last of these the first edition held in Southeast Asia; the 2027 championships are scheduled to return to Budapest and the 2029 edition to Beijing. A new Bureau, with Australian Matthew Dunn elevated to first vice-president and Portugal's António Silva confirmed as second vice-president, was elected at the Singapore Congress in July 2025. The period also saw the federation post record annual revenue, launch new world-ranking systems in several disciplines, and, in 2025–2026, become the target of litigation from a rival, doping-permissive competition promoter, the Enhanced Games (see § Governance and antitrust litigation).

== Name and disciplines ==
World Aquatics currently governs competition in six disciplines: swimming, diving, high diving, artistic swimming, water polo, and open water swimming. It also oversees Masters competition, open to competitors aged 18 and older, across its disciplines, and organises the separate World Aquatics Masters Championships for competitors aged 25 and older (30 and older in water polo).

Two of the six disciplines have changed names since FINA's founding. Synchronised swimming, part of the Olympic and FINA programme since the 1980s, was renamed "artistic swimming" in 2017 in recognition of an expanded judging emphasis on choreography and artistic impression alongside synchronisation. The federation itself dropped its French-derived acronym FINA for the English-language "World Aquatics" in January 2023, having operated under its original French name, Fédération internationale de natation, since 1908.

== Organisation and structure ==
Under the constitution ratified in December 2022, World Aquatics is governed and administered through seven bodies: the Congress, the Bureau, the Executive, the Aquatics Integrity Unit, the Athletes' Committee, the Technical Committees, and the Specialised Committees.

=== Congress ===
The Congress is the organisation's highest authority, with power to decide any matter arising within World Aquatics. An Ordinary Congress is held every two years, in principle alongside the World Championships or another major event, while an Extraordinary Congress may be convened by the Bureau or on the written request of at least one-fifth of members; both may be held in person or by teleconference, and voting by correspondence, including email, is permitted. Each member federation is represented by up to two delegates with voting rights, and each of the twenty elected members of the Athletes' Committee also holds one vote; the Honorary President chairs Congress sessions without a vote, and continental organisations may send up to two non-voting observers.

=== Bureau ===
The Bureau consists of the president and thirty-nine other members. Twenty-two continental representatives are elected by Congress, apportioned by region and by gender—five each from Africa, the Americas, Asia and Europe (with a cap of three of either gender per region) and two from Oceania, one of each gender—and from among them Congress elects five vice-presidents, one per continent, including a First and Second Vice-President, plus a treasurer. A further sixteen "World-at-Large" members are elected on a similar regional and gender basis, and the chair of the Athletes' Committee sits on the Bureau ex officio. Under the 2022 constitution the president's own term runs for eight years, renewable once for a further four, a lengthening intended to mirror the term structure used by the International Olympic Committee and to reduce the frequency of leadership contests; other Bureau members continue to be elected for four-year terms at each Ordinary Congress. Various standing committees and panels assist the Bureau with individual disciplines—for example the Technical Open Water Swimming Committee—or cross-cutting issues such as anti-doping.

=== Aquatics Integrity Unit ===
The Aquatics Integrity Unit (AQIU) was created as part of the 2021–2022 reform programme to handle ethics, disciplinary and safeguarding matters independently of the elected Bureau. It has since brought and adjudicated cases involving both athletes and officials; in one instance, a newly elected national-federation president was suspended from all international aquatics activity after an AQIU investigation found he had misled his federation's board during a dispute over a Bureau nomination.

=== Presidents ===
Each presidential term historically ran for four years, beginning and ending in the year following a Summer Olympics; under the 2022 constitution the term was lengthened to eight years, renewable once.

FINA/World Aquatics presidents
Name	Country	Term
George Hearn	Great Britain	1908–1924
Erik Bergvall	Sweden	1924–1928
Émile-Georges Drigny	France	1928–1932
Walther Binner	Germany	1932–1936
Harold Fern	Great Britain	1936–1948
René de Raeve	Belgium	1948–1952
M.L. Negri	Argentina	1952–1956
Jan de Vries	Netherlands	1956–1960
Max Ritter	West Germany	1960–1964
William Berge Phillips	Australia	1964–1968
Javier Ostos Mora	Mexico	1968–1972
Harold Henning	United States	1972–1976
Javier Ostos Mora (2nd term)	Mexico	1976–1980
Ante Lambaša	Yugoslavia	1980–1984
Robert Helmick	United States	1984–1988
Mustapha Larfaoui	Algeria	1988–2009
Julio Maglione	Uruguay	2009–2021
Husain Al-Musallam	Kuwait	2021–2023 (4-year term, superseded by constitutional change)
Husain Al-Musallam (re-elected)	Kuwait	2023–2031

=== Current Bureau members ===
Office	Officeholder	Country	Term
President	Husain Al-Musallam	Kuwait	2023–2031
First Vice President	Matthew Dunn	Australia	2025–2029
Second Vice President	António Silva	Portugal	2025–2029
Treasurer	Dale Neuburger	United States	2025–2029
Vice President	Yasser Mohamed Ibrahim Idris	Egypt	2025–2029
Vice President	Zhou Jihong	China	2025–2029
Executive Director	Brent Nowicki	United States	—

== Membership ==
Member federations by continental association

FINA's founding eight federations in 1908 had grown to 38 by 1928, 75 by 1958, 106 by 1978, 174 by 2000 and 197 by 2008. Bhutan became the 208th member in June 2017 and Anguilla the 209th later that year; by 2025 São Tomé and Príncipe had become the 210th. World Aquatics also permits unaffiliated athletes to compete under an "Athlete Refugee Team" banner, and, since 2023, allows Russian and Belarusian athletes to compete only as neutrals under conditions tied to the Russian invasion of Ukraine (see § Russia and Belarus).

Members are grouped into five continental associations:

- Africa (53 members): Africa Aquatics
- Americas (45 members): PanAm Aquatics
- Asia (45 members): Asia Aquatics
- Europe (52 members): European Aquatics
- Oceania (15 members): Oceania Aquatics

== Competitions ==
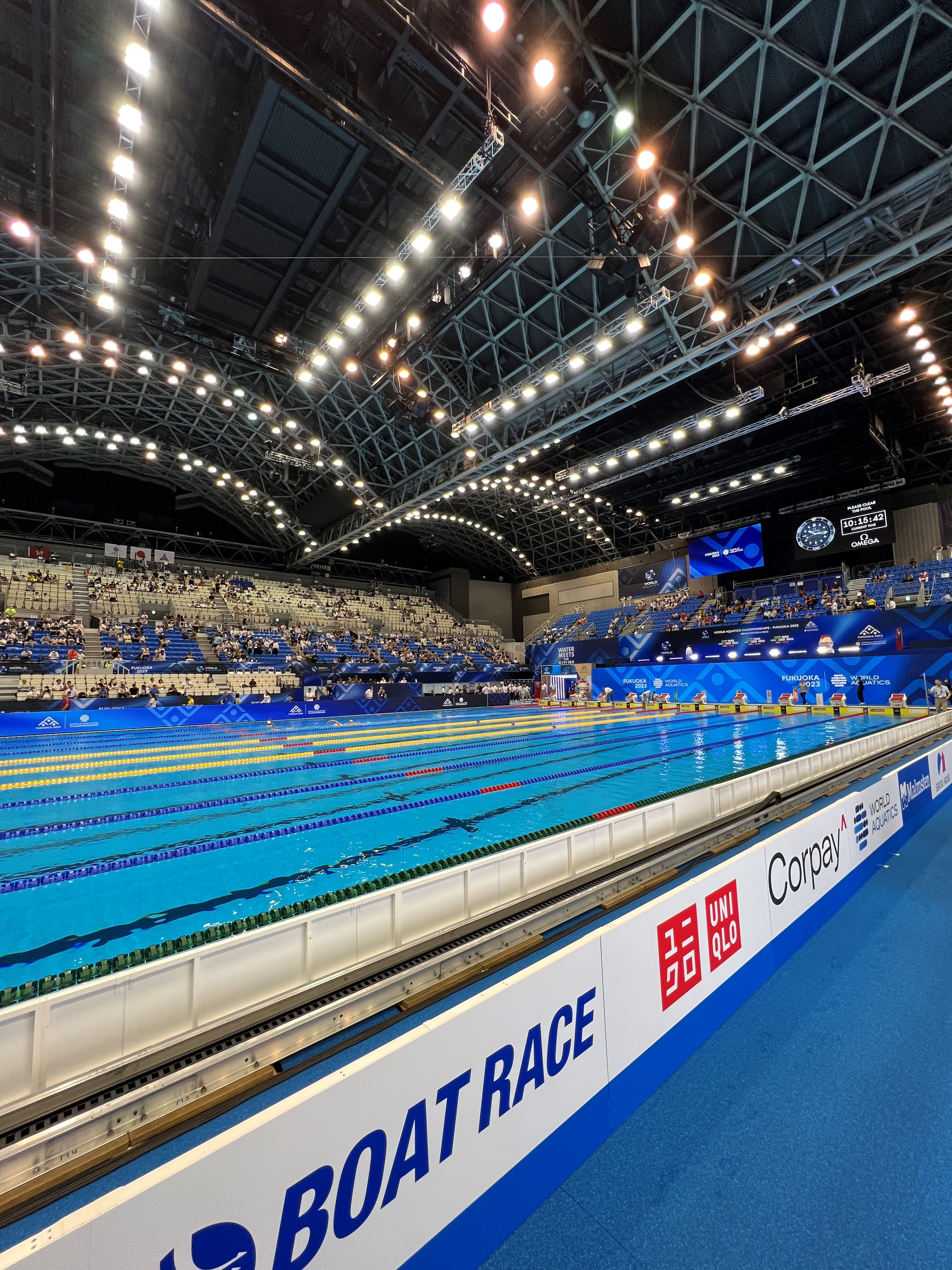
The main swimming venue at the 2023 World Aquatics Championships in Fukuoka, Japan

=== World Aquatics Championships ===
World Aquatics' flagship event is the World Aquatics Championships, traditionally held in odd-numbered years and contested across all six disciplines, with swimming races held in a 50-metre pool. The Open Water Swimming World Championships and, since 2015, the World Masters Championships (for competitors aged 25 and older, excluding high diving) are held alongside it. Before 2001 the championships were held at irregular intervals of two to four years; from 2001 to 2019 they settled into a biennial, odd-year rhythm, before the COVID-19 pandemic and a series of hosting changes—including the withdrawal of Kazan, Russia, following its invasion of Ukraine—forced editions in 2022, 2023, 2024 and 2025 before the event returned to a biennial schedule from 2025. The 2025 championships, in Singapore, were the first held in Southeast Asia and drew more than 2,500 athletes from over 200 national federations across the six disciplines.

=== Stand-alone discipline competitions ===
World Aquatics also runs a calendar of single-discipline tournaments, world series and junior events:

Discipline world tournaments

- Swimming: World Swimming Championships (25 m), a biennial short-course event held in even years
- Water polo: Men's and Women's Water Polo World Cups, which replaced the earlier Water Polo World Leagues; a four-a-side "WP4" format was launched in 2026
- Diving: Diving World Cup (biennial)
- High diving: High Diving World Cup (annual)

Discipline world series

- Swimming: Swimming World Cup (annual, usually 25 m, but 50 m in pre-Olympic years)
- Diving: Diving World Series (annual)
- Artistic swimming: Artistic Swimming World Cup (known as the World Series from 2017–2022)
- Open water swimming: Marathon Swim World Series (annual)

Junior championships

- Swimming: World Junior Swimming Championships (biennial)
- Water polo: Junior, Youth and Cadet Water Polo World Championships (biennial)
- Diving: World Junior Diving Championships (biennial)
- Artistic swimming: World Junior Artistic Swimming Championships (biennial)
- Open water swimming: World Junior Open Water Swimming Championships (biennial)

=== World rankings ===
World Aquatics assigns swimming performances a points value using a cubic formula benchmarked against world-record times, allowing results in different events and pool lengths to be compared on a common scale; the system, long known informally as "FINA points," is used by national federations and age-group programmes worldwide as well as by World Aquatics itself. From 2025 the federation introduced a dedicated world ranking system in open water swimming, combining an athlete's best results from the previous 24 months, weighted for the level and distance of the competition, the strength of the field, and how recently it was held; a comparable ranking system for water polo national teams followed the same year. The rankings are intended, among other things, to support qualification and seeding for World Aquatics events and to create new sponsorship and broadcast content.

== Rankings ==
=== Swimming ===
Athletes are ranked #1, and was updated as of November 2026.

==== Men ====
Event	Athlete/Country	Time
50 Freestyle	(Australia) Cameron McEvoy	20.88 (WR)
100 Freestyle	(Romania) David Popovici	46.56
200 Freestyle	(France) León Marchand	1.43.76
400 Freestyle	(Australia) Sam Short	3.40.52
800 Freestyle	(Australia) Sam Short	7.36.73
1500 Freestyle	(Germany) Johannes Liebmann	14.26.79 (WR)
50 Backstroke	(Russia) Kliment Kolesnikov	23.86
100 Backstroke	(South Africa) Pieter Coetze	51.71
200 Backstroke	(Hungary) Hubert Kos	1.52.30
50 Breastroke	(Italy) Simone Cerasuolo	26.20
100 Breastroke	(United States) Van Mathias	58.01
200 Breastroke	(Japan) Shin Ohashi	2.04.83 (WR)
50 Butterfly	(Russia) Egor Kornev	22.36
100 Butterfly	(Hungary) Kristóf Milak	49.48
200 Butterfly	(France) León Marchand	1.51.72
200 Medley	(Hungary) Hubert Kos	1.54.24
400 Medley	(France) León Marchand	4.04.56

==== Women ====
Event	Name	Time
50 Freestyle	(United States) Kate Douglass	23.19 (WR)
100 Freestyle	(Netherlands) Marrit Steenbergen	51.68 (WR)
200 Freestyle	(Australia) Mollie O'Callaghan	1.52.86
400 Freestyle	(Australia) Lani Pallister	3.58.42
800 Freestyle	(Australia) Lani Pallister	8.06.10
1500 Freestyle	(United States) Katie Ledecky	15.23.21
50 Backstroke	(Italy) Sara Curtis	26.56 (WR)
100 Backstroke	(United States) Regan Smith	57.49
200 Backstroke	(Australia) Kaylee McKeown	2.03.98
50 Breastroke	(China) Tang Qianting	29.44
100 Breastroke	(United Kingdom) Angharad Evans	1.04.87
200 Breaststroke	(Russia) Evgeniia Chikunova	2.19.32
50 Butterfly	(United States) Gretchen Walsh	24.51
100 Butterfly	(United States) Gretchen Walsh	54.33 (WR)
200 Butterfly	(Canada) Summer McIntosh	2.01.65 (WR)
200 Medley	(China) Yu Zidi	2.06.10
400 Medley	(Canada) Summer McIntosh	4.27.35

=== Water Polo ===
==== Men ====
World Aquatics Men's Water Polo Rankings (as of 15 September 2026)
Rank	Country	Games	Points
1	Greece	53	1934.40
2	Hungary	52	1917.55
3	Spain	51	1874.85
4	Croatia	50	1672.15
5	Italy	44	1524.75
6	Serbia	47	1523.35
7	Montenegro	52	1408.80
8	United States	39	1008.85
9	Australia	29	923.95
10	France	37	843.00

==== Women ====
World Aquatics Women's Water Polo Rankings (as of 15 September 2026)
Rank	Country	Games	Points
1	Spain	50	1851.75
2	Netherlands	52	1738.20
3	Hungary	51	1642.10
4	United States	47	1592.80
5	Greece	49	1580.25
6	Italy	51	1277.50
7	Australia	38	1216.30
8	China	33	949.90
9	Great Britain	36	722.55
10	Croatia	30	654.20

== Finances, sponsorship and broadcasting ==
World Aquatics reported total operating revenue of US$107.8 million for 2024, its highest ever, a figure inflated by the coincidence of an Olympic year with both the World Aquatics Championships (Doha) and the World Aquatics Swimming Championships (25 m, Budapest) in the same twelve months; Olympic revenue-sharing from the IOC contributed $38.9 million, media rights and sponsorship $32.1 million, and hosting fees and other commercial income the remainder. After expenses—including $28.7 million on development and athlete support and $10.8 million on administration—the federation posted an operating surplus of $38.8 million and, with investment income, a net surplus of $51.2 million for the year, taking combined assets to $241.5 million. World Aquatics has said it spent more than $10 million in legal fees defending its position in the ISL antitrust litigation between 2018 and the case's resolution in 2026 (see § Governance and antitrust litigation).

The federation derives the bulk of its commercial revenue from event sponsors and from broadcast agreements, including a long-running free-to-air arrangement with the European Broadcasting Union and a deal that keeps World Aquatics events on NBC Sports platforms in the United States through the 2028 Los Angeles Olympics.

== Controversies ==
=== Doping ===
==== East German state-sponsored doping ====
FINA's most consequential doping episode predates modern anti-doping testing regimes. From the early 1970s the East German government ran a covert, state-directed programme, internally designated State Plan 14.25, that administered anabolic steroids to athletes, including many teenage swimmers, without their informed consent; East German women alone won 32 of 41 available Olympic swimming titles between 1976 and 1988 and set 130 world records, 79 of them between 1973 and 1976. Because the doping was systemic rather than individually detected at the time, and because FINA and the IOC did not retroactively sanction athletes without an admission, no East German swimmer was ever stripped of a medal; Germany later paid roughly $4.1 million in compensation to more than 150 former East German athletes harmed by the programme. Lothar Kipke, the East German team's chief physician and a member of FINA's own medical commission—for which FINA had given him an honour in the 1980s—was convicted in a German court in 2000 on more than fifty counts of causing bodily harm to the athletes in his care. Amid a broader push for transparency under president Al-Musallam, and following a public petition from Olympic-era swimmers including Shirley Babashoff, FINA's Bureau voted unanimously in November 2021 to remove Kipke from its honours list.

==== Individual doping cases at the Olympics ====
American Rick DeMont became the first swimmer stripped of an Olympic gold medal for doping when, at the 1972 Summer Olympics, a post-race test after his win in the 400-metre freestyle detected trace ephedrine from Marax, an asthma medication he had properly declared on his pre-Games medical form; U.S. team officials had not passed that declaration on to the IOC's medical commission, but DeMont, then sixteen, was disqualified regardless and barred from his remaining events. The United States Olympic Committee formally welcomed him back and recognised his achievements in 2001, though the IOC has never restored his medal. Irish swimmer Michelle Smith, who won three gold medals and a bronze at the 1996 Summer Olympics amid persistent, unproven doping allegations from rivals, was banned from the sport for four years by FINA in 1998 after a urine sample she provided for an out-of-competition test was found to contain a concentration of alcohol inconsistent with human consumption, which FINA's panel concluded had been added deliberately to mask other substances; the Court of Arbitration for Sport upheld the ban on appeal, and because manipulation rather than a positive result for a banned substance was the finding, her Atlanta medals were not annulled.

==== Sun Yang case ====
Chinese swimmer Sun Yang, a triple Olympic champion, had already served a short ban imposed by the Chinese federation for a 2014 positive test when, in September 2018, he and members of his household destroyed a vial containing his blood during an out-of-competition doping control, after his entourage disputed the credentials of the visiting testers; his mother instructed a security guard to smash the sample container. A FINA disciplinary panel initially cleared Sun of wrongdoing, finding the testers had not adequately proven their accreditation, allowing him to compete—and win two gold medals amid podium protests from rivals including Australia's Mack Horton and Britain's Duncan Scott—at the 2019 World Championships in Gwangju. The World Anti-Doping Agency (WADA) appealed to the Court of Arbitration for Sport, which in February 2020 overturned FINA's finding and, citing Sun's prior violation, imposed an eight-year ban that ended his prospects of competing at the Tokyo Olympics. Sun successfully challenged that panel's composition before the Swiss Federal Supreme Court, which found that its chairman had made racially insensitive remarks about China during the hearing and ordered a new panel to reconsider the sanction; the reconstituted CAS panel in 2021 reduced the ban to four years and three months, backdated to February 2020, still barring Sun from the Tokyo Games but permitting a return to competition thereafter.

==== 2021 positive tests among Chinese swimmers ====
In 2024, reporting by The New York Times revealed that 23 Chinese swimmers, several of whom went on to win medals at the Tokyo Olympics, had tested positive for the banned heart medication trimetazidine in an in-competition test in early 2021; China's anti-doping authority attributed the results to accidental contamination of a hotel kitchen and did not publicly announce the finding, and WADA opted not to appeal the decision, saying it found no evidence to disprove the contamination theory. A member of World Aquatics' own anti-doping advisory body said it had been "inexplicably and forcibly shut out" of any review of the case, and a former WADA deputy director general said the episode had left athletes with "zero confidence" in the federation. In July 2024, World Aquatics confirmed that its executive director, Brent Nowicki, had been subpoenaed to testify before United States authorities as part of a federal criminal investigation into the affair.

==== Sanctions on retired athletes ====
World Aquatics has continued to impose anti-doping suspensions on athletes who had already retired by the time a violation was confirmed, including Lithuanian Rūta Meilutytė (banned 2019–2021) and Russians Artem Lobuzov, Alexandra Sokolova and Artem Podyakov (each banned 2021–2025).

=== Transgender and sex-eligibility policy ===
On 19 June 2022, at an Extraordinary General Congress held during the Budapest World Championships, member federations voted by 71 per cent to adopt a policy restricting the women's competition category by sex characteristics. Under the policy, transgender women are eligible for the women's category only if they can demonstrate to the federation's satisfaction that they have not experienced any part of male puberty beyond Tanner Stage 2, or before age 12, whichever is later; women who have undergone masculinising hormone therapy remain eligible provided any such treatment was pre-pubertal, lasted less than a year, and testosterone levels have returned to pre-treatment levels, while transgender men remain fully eligible for the men's category, which the policy does not restrict. FINA simultaneously announced it would work with a group of scientists, athletes and lawyers to explore creating a separate "open" category for some events.

Supporters of the policy, including a majority of the federations that voted for it, framed it as necessary to preserve fairness in women's competition; the policy's critics called it "discriminatory, harmful, unscientific and not in line with" the IOC's own 2021 framework, in the words of the advocacy group Athlete Ally, and it drew critical coverage from outlets including The Guardian and The Washington Post. American swimmer Lia Thomas challenged the policy's application to her before the Court of Arbitration for Sport; in June 2024, CAS ruled that she lacked standing to bring the case and that the ineligibility determination therefore stood.

=== Equipment disputes ===
In 2021, World Aquatics (then FINA) declined to approve the Soul Cap, a swim cap designed to accommodate natural Black hair, for use at the Olympics, stating the design did not fit "the natural form of the head" and that, to the federation's knowledge, elite competitors had not needed caps of that size. The decision drew criticism that it discouraged Black swimmers from the sport, and the federation said it would review the matter; it reversed the decision the following year and approved Soul Caps for competition.

=== Governance and antitrust litigation ===
==== International Swimming League ====
The International Swimming League (ISL), a team-based professional circuit conceived as a rival to federation-sanctioned competition, planned an inaugural exhibition meet in Turin, Italy, in December 2018. FINA instructed its member federations to enforce existing rules barring cooperation with "non-members" and warned that swimmers who competed could be banned from FINA events, including the Olympics; the Turin meet was cancelled after national federations complied. Three prominent swimmers, Katinka Hosszú, Michael Andrew and Tom Shields, then filed a proposed class-action antitrust suit against FINA in the U.S. District Court for the Northern District of California, and the ISL filed a related suit of its own, both alleging that FINA had violated the Sherman Antitrust Act by using its control of Olympic qualification to suppress a competing market for elite swimming competition.

A district court initially granted summary judgment for FINA, but the United States Court of Appeals for the Ninth Circuit reversed that decision in September 2024, allowing the case to proceed to trial. In September 2025, World Aquatics agreed to pay $4.6 million into a fund compensating swimmers who had signed contracts to compete in the cancelled 2018 event and the ISL's 2019 season. The ISL's own claim went to trial before U.S. Magistrate Judge Jacqueline Scott Corley, and on 23 January 2026 a San Francisco jury found that World Aquatics and at least one member federation had engaged in an unlawful group boycott of the league, that the two organisations were direct competitors, and that the anticompetitive harm outweighed any procompetitive justification—but concluded that the ISL, which had sought $41 million before mandatory trebling, had failed to prove it suffered measurable financial loss, and awarded damages of just $1. World Aquatics president Al-Musallam said the litigation had "taken up resources that would have been much better utilised" on the sport, and both sides claimed vindication in the case's outcome.

==== Enhanced Games ====
In June 2025, World Aquatics adopted a bylaw threatening lifetime ineligibility for athletes, coaches and other "relevant persons" who participate in or endorse sporting events that "embrace the use of scientific advancements or other practices that may include prohibited substances," a rule aimed at the Enhanced Games, a doping-permissive competition promoted by Australian entrepreneur Aron D'Souza and scheduled to hold its first edition in Las Vegas in 2026. In August 2025, Enhanced US LLC filed an antitrust suit in New York federal court against World Aquatics, USA Swimming and WADA, seeking up to $800 million and alleging the three organisations had unlawfully conspired to boycott the Enhanced Games and block its access to elite athletes. WADA had earlier called the Enhanced Games a "dangerous and irresponsible concept," while World Aquatics described it as "a circus, built on shortcuts." A federal judge dismissed the complaint for failure to state a claim in early 2026, while granting Enhanced leave to file an amended pleading.

==== Zhou Jihong ethics case ====
In May 2022, New Zealand Olympic diving judge Lisa Wright said that FINA vice-president Zhou Jihong had verbally confronted her after the men's 10-metre platform final at the 2020 Summer Olympics over her scoring of Chinese divers; the New Zealand federation lodged a complaint with FINA's Ethics Panel, which found the episode had involved "misunderstanding mixed with misjudgement" and directed Zhou to write a letter of apology, while recommending she be removed from her liaison role to the Diving technical committee. Separately, former New Zealand diving official Simon Latimer said he had sent FINA's executive director a whistleblower letter in December 2021 alleging that Zhou had coached Chinese divers during major events and influenced judging panels in their favour; video footage that subsequently circulated appeared to show Zhou coaching a Chinese diver during the Tokyo Games. Latimer was not returned to FINA's Technical Diving Committee at elections in July 2022, in a process in which Zhou had a say. FINA's by-laws were subsequently amended to bar holders of the Bureau Liaison role from acting as a team leader or coach at international events, including the Olympics.

=== Russia and Belarus ===
Following the 2022 Russian invasion of Ukraine, FINA banned Russian and Belarusian athletes and officials from its events through the end of 2022, withdrew hosting rights for a World Championships that had been due to take place in Russia, and stripped Russian and Belarusian competitors of the right to compete under their countries' names, flags or anthems. Times posted by Russian swimmers at non-FINA meets during 2022 were not recognised for world rankings or records. In September 2023, World Aquatics set out criteria under which individual Russian and Belarusian athletes could return to competition as neutrals, and in November 2025 extended similar terms to the Russian water polo team ahead of the 2026 season. On 13 April 2026, World Aquatics went further, restoring full membership to the Russian and Belarusian federations and allowing their athletes to compete under their own flags and anthems.

=== 2016 Rio Olympics water quality ===
During the diving competition at the 2016 Summer Olympics in Rio de Janeiro, the water in the Maria Lenk Aquatics Centre's diving pool turned a visible green over the course of a day, followed shortly afterwards by the adjoining water polo pool. FINA said the discolouration resulted from a drop in the water's pH level after venue staff ran out of water-treatment chemicals, while Rio 2016 organisers separately attributed it to an algae bloom brought on by heat and a lack of wind; FINA's medical committee tested the water and found no risk to athletes' health, though some competitors, including members of the United States water polo team, said the chemical treatment applied afterwards had stung their eyes and impaired visibility.

== See also ==
- History of competitive swimwear
- World Aquatics Athletes of the Year
- World Aquatics Day
- International Swimming Hall of Fame (ISHOF)
- List of swimming competitions
- List of international sport federations
- Major achievements in swimming by nation
