= Ostos =

Ostos is a Spanish surname. Notable people with the surname include:

- César Augusto Verástegui Ostos (born 1966), Mexican politician
- Luis Gerardo Ostos (born 1962), Mexican entrepreneur, Mexico and U.S.
- Javier Ostos Mora (1916-2008), Mexican lawyer
- Julio Ostos (born 1953), Venezuelan chess master
- Raymond Munoz Ostos (born 1963), American, Spanish-Mexican U.S. Army Military Officer
- Luis Ostos (born 1992), Peruvian long-distance runner
