= Javier Mora =

Javier Mora may refer to:

- Javier Mora (boxer) (born 1981), Mexican boxer
- Javier Ostos Mora (1916–2008), lawyer and sport politician from Mexico

== See also ==
- Mora (disambiguation)
