= WONC =

Radio station at North Central College in Naperville, Illinois

- Naperville, Illinois; United States
- Broadcast area: Chicago
- Frequency: 89.1 MHz
- Branding: Pure Rock FM 89

Programming
- Format: Album-oriented rock

Ownership
- Owner: North Central College

History
- First air date: 1968

Technical information
- Licensing authority: FCC
- Facility ID: 49179
- Class: A
- ERP: 1,500 watts
- HAAT: 50 meters (160 ft)
- Transmitter coordinates: 41°46′34.00″N 88°11′41.00″W

Links
- Public license information: Public file; LMS
- Webcast: Listen Live
- Website: wonc.org

WONC (89.1 FM) is a radio station broadcasting an album-oriented rock format. Licensed to Naperville, Illinois, United States, the station serves the Chicago area. The station is currently owned by North Central College.

== History ==
The station has been in operation since July 1, 1968. From 1997 to 2026, the station broadcast from a renovated house at 232 E. Chicago Ave. in Naperville. On July 30, 2026, the station began broadcasting from studios in Schneller Hall in Naperville. Before 1997, WONC's studios were located on the fourth floor of the Old Main campus building at 30 N. Brainard St. The broadcast tower is located at 1805 High Grove Lane on the western edge of Naperville.

On September 1, 1980, John V. Madormo succeeded Jon Yoder as the faculty advisor and general manager of WONC. Formerly a producer for Chicago's WGN radio, Madormo's experience led WONC to being recognized as one of the premier college radio stations in the country. The station won 20 Marconi awards during his tenure; no other college station won more.

Over the years, WONC has been a participating station in the IBS (Intercollegiate Broadcasting System) awards and has won several awards. WONC was named the 2015 Abraham and Borst Best College Station in the Nation and the 2015 IBS Best College station (Under 10,000 enrollment).

WONC celebrated its 50th anniversary May 11, 2018, with a party at the radio station that culminated with dozens of alumni attending and local press coverage by the Daily Herald and NCTV17. The party also served as a send-off for Madormo, who went on to retire after the 2017-18 academic year, having spent 38 of WONC's 50 years as general manager. Madormo was succeeded by North Central/WONC alum Zachary DeWitz.

== Format ==
The format has been album-oriented rock (commonly known within the radio business as AOR) since approximately 1987 and uses the slogan "Pure Rock FM 89". From the station's inception to the 1980s, it was a more typical college free-form station. An adult contemporary format was aired for a time prior to the switch to the current format.

Every night from 10 p.m. until midnight is reserved for "Vintage Rock", which plays rock songs that were released between the years 1964 and 1974. At 10:30 p.m. is the "4x4", which plays four consecutive songs from a featured artist as follows:

- Monday - The Doors
- Tuesday - The Rolling Stones
- Wednesday - Jimi Hendrix
- Thursday - The Beatles
- Friday - Led Zeppelin
- Saturday - The Who
- Sunday - Mystery artist

Every weekday features "Lunchtime Second Helpings", which plays back-to-back songs from every artist during the noon hour, and "The All-Request Pure Rock Happy Hour" at 5 p.m.

The station provides coverage of North Central College's football, men's basketball, women's basketball, baseball and softball games.

Each fall, the station hosts the John Drury High School Radio Awards, honoring the legendary Chicago newscaster. High school radio stations from around the country are invited to the North Central College campus, and students, advisors, and stations are recognized in 18 categories, including Best DJ, Best Newscast, Best PSA, Broadcaster of the Year, and Best High School Radio Station.
