= World Aquatics Day =

Barnabas Musa Diye

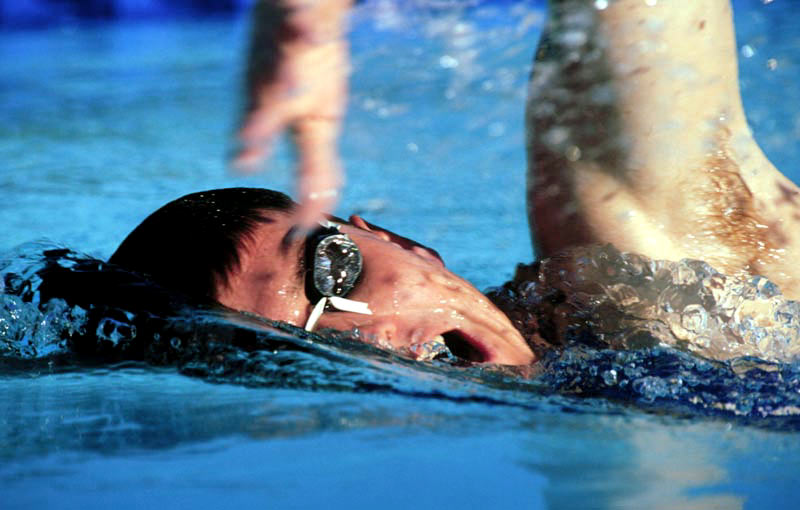
- Observed by: Global
- Type: FINA World Aquatics Day
- Celebrations: Competitions and events
- Date: First weekend of July
- Frequency: Annual

World Aquatics Day is an international day which recognises, and celebrates physical activity in aquatic sports. It was established by the organisation FINA, and takes place on the first weekend of July. This comes just before 19 July, which commemorates the founding of the federation in London, 1908.

When the FINA Bureau held a meeting in 2016, an international world day of aquatics was established, in an effort to encourage people around the globe to take part in any form of exercise in water. This includes, but is not limited to: swimming, diving, high diving, artistic swimming, water polo, and open water swimming, which are the six disciplines currently overseen by FINA. Aquatic organisations around the world organise activities and events to promote the positive wellbeing aquatic exercise can have. In 2020, due to the health crisis forcing many pools to close, organisations continued to promote aquatic sports with alternative dry land competitions.
