= Husain Al-Musallam =

Kuwaiti sports administrator (born 1960)

- حسين المسلم
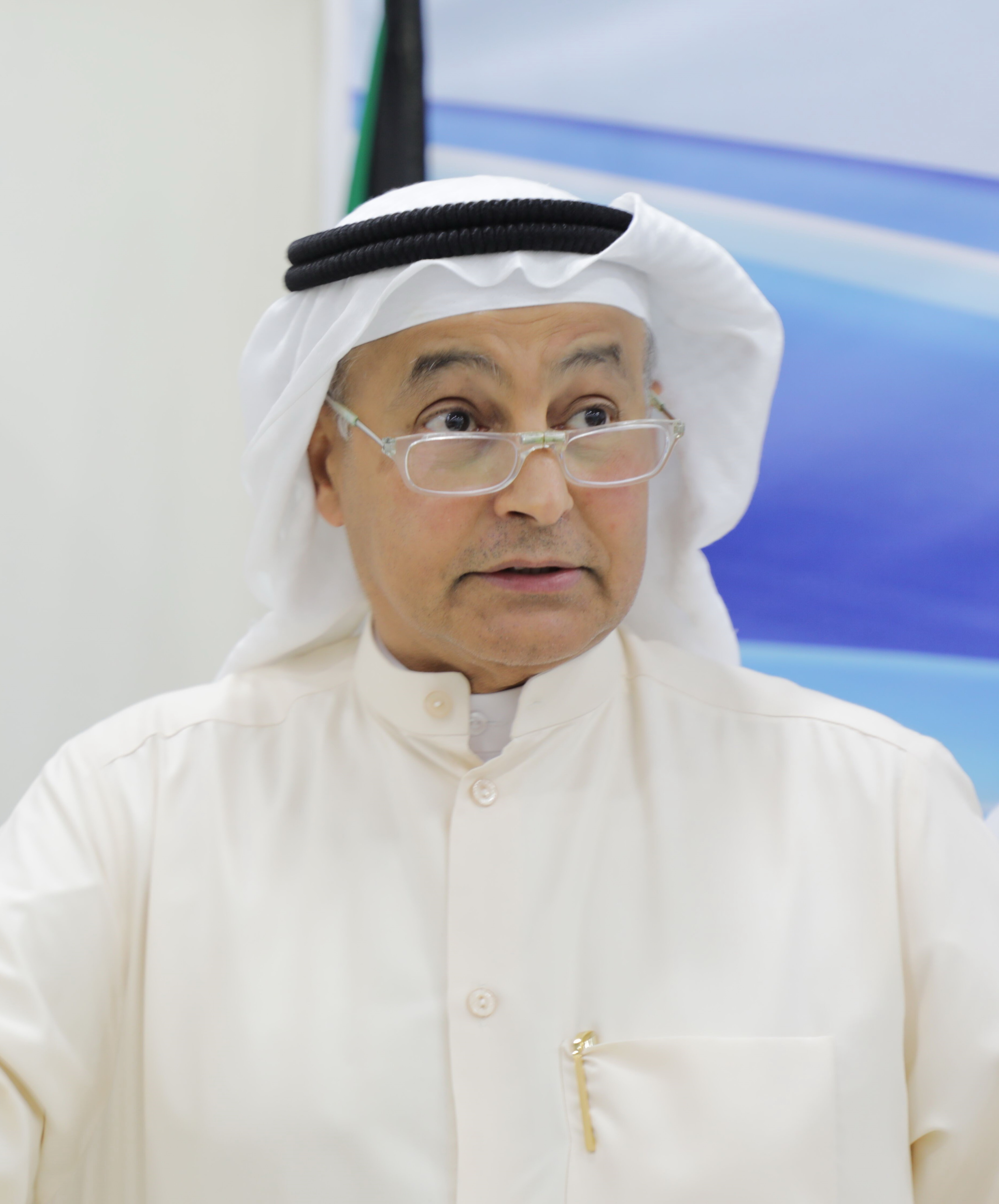

Director General of Olympic Council of Asia
- Incumbent
- Assumed office September 2005

Secretary General of Kuwait Olympic Committee
- Incumbent
- Assumed office March 2019

President of World Aquatics
- Incumbent
- Assumed office June 2021

Personal details
- Born: 19 May 1960 (age 66) Kuwait
- Education: University of Berlin - Sports Management Diploma
- Alma mater: Oxford Air Training School
- Profession: Sports administrator Former airline pilot

Husain Al-Musallam (Arabic: حسين المسلم; born 19 May 1960) is a Kuwaiti sports administrator and former airline pilot. He currently serves as the Director General of the Olympic Council of Asia, Secretary General of the Kuwait Olympic Committee (KOC), and the president of World Aquatics.

== Early life and career ==
Musallam was born on 19 May 1960 in Kuwait. He joined the swimming club of Kazma Sports Club at the age of 8 and became a member of the national team at 13. Between 1974 and 1976, he competed in all Pan-Arab, Asian and World Swimming Championships.

In 1978 he joined Kuwait Airways Corporation as a co-pilot and promoted to airline captain in 1988. He has worked as a training and check captain since 1994.

He joined the Olympic Council of Asia on 25 December 1982, and became Deputy Director General and Technical Director in December 1998. He joined the OCA Executive Board on 23 January 2003. He has served as the Director General since September 2005.

On 30 June 2019 he was elected as the Secretary General of the Kuwait Olympic Committee. He was re-elected in 2023 for another five-year term.

=== World Aquatics ===
In 2015 he was elected as First Vice President of International Swimming Federation (FINA), and became president in 2021. In December 2022, FINA changed its name to World Aquatics. In July 2023, Musallam was elected to a new eight-year term as the president of the World Aquatics organization.

== Controversies ==
=== Implication in FIFA bribery scandal ===
In May 2017, The Times suggested that Hussain Al-Musallam was "co-conspirator #3" in a US Department of Justice indictment of Richard Lai, a former member of FIFA's Audit and Compliance Committee and head of the Guam Football Association. In his guilty plea, Richard Lai admitted to accepting $750,000 in wire transfers from accounts controlled by "co-conspirator #3" or his assistants. The OCA, in a written statement to The Times, denied the allegations and "asked the OCA ethics committee to carry out a full review."

In September 2021, the Associated Press reported that Sheikh Ahmed Al-Fahad Al-Sabah and Hussain Al-Musallam were targeted by the U.S. Department of Justice for suspected racketeering and bribery in relation to FIFA. According to the AP, in 2017, the US formally requested evidence from Kuwait. American prosecutors "wanted to establish if the suspects made other payments to [Richard] Lai, or if their accounts were used to wire possible bribe payments to other soccer officials."

=== IOC ethics investigation into an alleged commission request ===
In July 2017, the International Olympic Committee (IOC) Ethics Commission launched an investigation into Al-Musallam, in his capacity as the Director General of the Olympic Council of Asia (OCA), following allegations reported by The Times, Der Spiegel, and SwimVortex. These reports accused Al-Musallam of attempting to secure a 10% commission from potential sponsorship contracts. The controversy stemmed from a recorded conversation, released by journalist Jens Weinreich, which documented a meeting between Al-Musallam and a Chinese marketing agent. During this meeting, Al-Musallam is allegedly heard proposing that he and OCA president Sheikh Ahmad Al-Fahad Al-Sabah receive 10% of any OCA sponsorship deals for the Asian Games as a 'commission'.

Al-Musallam asserted that the recording was misinterpreted, saying that, under the proposal, "10 per cent of the Rights Fee would go directly to the OCA (hence to 'us')", and that he "did not personally request any commission for [himself] at any stage nor did [he] receive any commission".

=== Gulf State Games contracts ===
In early 2024, allegations emerged against Al-Musallam in connection with his Secretary General role at the KOC and as an organizer of the 3rd Gulf State Games in May 2022. The claims state that a contract worth about KWD 3.42 million (approx $11.12 million) was awarded to Dynamic General Trading & Contracting (also known as Dynamic General Trading Import and Export), a company allegedly owned by members of his family, including his wife and children. Al-Musallam described the allegations as "baseless" and "politically motivated", and said KOC's Ethics Commission had cleared him of wrongdoing related to a contract with the Gulf State Games, having found "no violation of the rules" after reviewing all documentation.

=== Financial irregularities within Asia Aquatics ===
Again in early 2024 various reports emerged alleging financial irregularities within Asia Aquatics during Al-Musallam’s tenure. According to leaked correspondence from the Asia Aquatics Secretary General, substantial support funds provided by Kuwait’s Public Authority for Sport could not be accounted for, prompting calls for clarification from member federations ahead of the Asia Aquatics Congress. The KOC President also referred concerns to the Kuwait Ethics Commission and national anti-corruption authorities in relation to contract awards involving a company linked to Al-Musallam’s close relative.

=== Others ===
In May 2025, new reports accused Al-Musallam of distributing bribes using funds from the OCA and the Association of National Olympic Committees, supporting Kirsty Coventry's IOC presidential election, and negotiating the 2036 Olympics between Qatar and India to "save himself" amid investigations. Allegations also emerged regarding his acquisition of a Hungarian passport and property in Hungary, potentially funded through questionable means, alongside plans to relocate World Aquatics headquarters to Budapest by 2027.
