= Dick Blick (swimmer) =

American swimmer (born 1940)

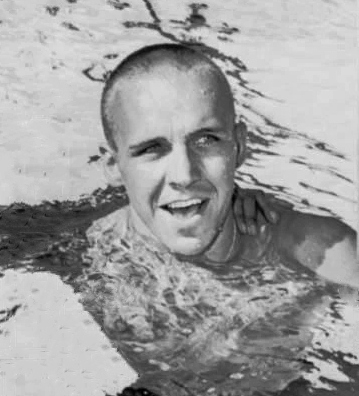
- Blick in 1961

Personal information
- Full name: Richard Adolph Blick
- Nickname: "Dick"
- National team: United States
- Born: July 29, 1940 (age 85) Los Angeles, California, U.S.
- Height: 6 ft 5 in (1.96 m)
- Weight: 192 lb (87 kg)
- Spouse: Shirley L. Youngberg
- Children: 2

Sport
- Sport: Swimming
- Strokes: Freestyle mid-range, and distance
- Club: North Central Swim Club
- College team: North Central College 1962
- Coach: Hal Henning (North Central College)
Medal record
Men's swimming
Representing the United States
Olympic Games
Gold medal – first place	1960 Rome	4x200 m freestyle
Pan American Games
Gold medal – first place	1959 Chicago	4x200m freestyle

Richard Adolph Blick (born July 29, 1940) is an American former competition swimmer, 1960 Olympic champion in the 4x200-meter freestyle relay, and former world record-holder. He competed for North Central College under International Hall of Fame Coach Dr. Hal Henning Jr. After his swimming career ended in 1962, he earned a Masters in Physical Education from Indiana University, and had a long career in High School education as a coach, math teacher, and principal in California.

Born to German immigrants Helen and Frank Blick in Los Angeles, California on July 29, 1940, Blick attended Bakersfield High School, where he played football, basketball, and helped lead the Bakersfield High swim team to two league titles. Along with a few other team members, he got an edge on the competition in his Senior year by finding a motel pool to train at in the winter, as the Bakersfield area had no heated outdoor pools. At the 1961 National Outdoor swimming championships in Los Angeles, he went under the standing record in the 200 freestyle, swimming a 2:01.5, though it placed him in third behind University of Southern California swimmer and two-time Olympian Murray Rose who set the new record. Rose would swim for the Australian 4x200 meter relay team in 1960 and earn the bronze medal, competing against Blick's American team in the event.

In international swimming competition, Blick was a member of the U.S. Pan American team from 1959-1961. Prior to his Olympic gold medal, Blick competed in the 1959 Pan American Games in Chicago, helping the US win gold in the 4x200 free relay. Yale swim coach Bob Kiphuth declared Blick at 19, "the finest 200-meter swimmer ever born in the United States", and considered him a "certain member of the 1960 Olympic team".

== 1960 Olympic gold medal ==
Blick qualified for the 1960 Olympics at the U.S. Trials in Detroit in August. At the trials on August 5, 1960, he finished second to George Harrison's of Stanford's time of 2:03.1 in the finals of the 200-meter freestyle. Blick's time was a 2:04.2, outstanding for 1960. For a brief period, Blick would be rated as the top swimmer in the world in the 200-meter freestyle event. Jeff Farrell finished third with a 2:04.6, despite suffering from an appendicitis around six days earlier.

After having qualified at the trials, Blick competed at the 1960 Olympic Games in Rome, where he won a gold medal as a member of the first-place U.S. team in the men's 4×200-meter freestyle relay. The American team set a new World Record time of 8:10.2, beating the Japanese team by 3 seconds, who were closely followed by the Australians. Swimming anchor for the U.S. team, Jeff Farrell, considered one of the fastest 200 metre swimmers in the world, performed up to expectations, despite his fairly recent appendicitis. George Harrison, who finished first in the 200-meter trials in Detroit, swam first.

== North Central College swimmer ==
Blick secured a swimming scholarship to Naperville, Illinois's North Central College where he started classes in Fall 1959 and was trained and managed by Hall of Fame Coach Dr. Hal Henning Jr. As a high point in his collegiate career, he helped lead North Central to two National championships in 1961 and 1962. As a world class swimmer at North Central, he won 11 National Association of Intercollegiate Athletics (NAIA) titles which included the 100-yard freestyle in 1959, and from 1961-62. . He also held titles in the 220-yard freestyle from 1959–62, which he considered his best event, and the 440-yard freestyle from 1959-62. Graduating North Central College in 1962, Blick set the American record in the 220-yard free, set both world and American records in the 200-meter free, and as part of an 800-meter free relay team, set a new American record. As of 1972, Blick remained the only North Central College athlete to ever win an Olympic gold medal.

== Educator and coach ==
After completing his degree at North Central, Blick received a Masters’ in Physical Education from Indiana University in 1962, and decided to retire from competitive swimming. Beginning his career in education around 1963 after moving to California, he coached swimming and taught at Foothill High School, Bakersfield High School, Lynbrook High School, San Jose High School, and Pioneer High Schools. His wife Shirley taught Elementary School.

Blick taught math and physical education for a long stint at Lynbrook High School in Cupertino, California and after 1990 at Kingsburg High School in Kingsburg, California. He served as the principal in the 80s at Los Gatos Christian. From 1978-1990, he served primarily as a High School administrator, likely in addition to teaching. In all, he spent over 30 years in California teaching math, and physical education, administering High School, and coaching swimming. In 1990, he coached the Ripon Sea Lions, an age group team in Ripon, California, in the Greater Modesto, California area.

As a coaching highlight, in 1976 he coached the San Jose Area's Lynbrook High School swim team to a perfect season, and was subsequently named California Coaches Association Coach of the Year. From 1964-1977, he coached 25 Prep All-Americans, in both swimming and water polo. He later coached teens, children, and a masters group at Crusader Aquatics in Modesto, California.

He is now retired and living in Nebraska with his wife, the former Shirley L. Youngberg, whom he married in June, 1962 while they were both Seniors at North Central College. The couple had a son and daughter. Now in his 80s, he continues to swim regularly at the Fremont YMCA pool, in Fremont, Nebraska, where the couple spends time with their son and grandchildren. Their daughter and family resides in California.

== Honors ==
In 1977, he was elected to the Bakerfield area's Bob Elias Kern County Sports Hall of Fame, and in 1976 was a California Coaches Association Coach of the Year. An exceptional collegiate swimmer, in 2004 he was inducted into the North Central College Sports Hall of Fame.

== See also ==
- List of Olympic medalists in swimming (men)
- World record progression 4 × 200 metres freestyle relay
