= Katherine Whitney Curtis =

American swimmer (1897–1980)

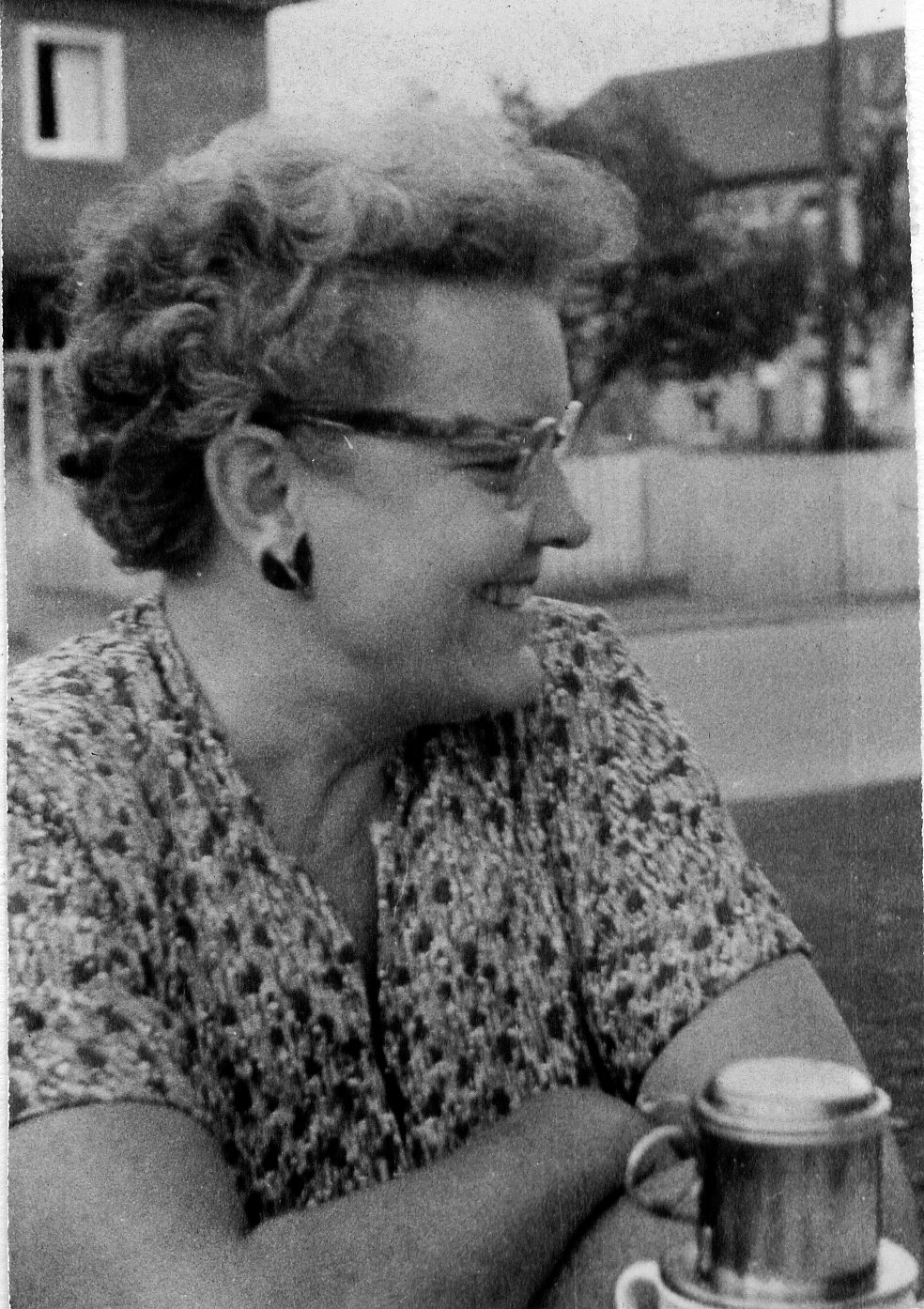
Kay Curtis in Nuremberg, Germany c. 1946

Katherine Whitney Curtis (January 4, 1897 – July 6, 1980), also spelled "Katharine" or "Kay" Curtis, was an American swimmer and physical education instructor who is widely credited as the true originator of synchronized swimming. While historical figures such as Esther Williams and Annette Kellerman are recognized for similar contributions, important historical details regarding the origin of the phrase "synchronized swimming", its reference to the Olympic sport, and the technical structure of that sport are all credited to Curtis.

The only descendants of Katherine's family survive through her nephew, Gaylord Whitney, in central Ohio. Her great-grandnephew, Jordan Whitney Wei, is both the writer and primary researcher for her first comprehensive biography.

Kay Curtis introduced synchronized swimming in 1934 at the Chicago World's Fair with Norman Ross as her announcer. To her, synchronized swimming was a co-ed sport as it still might be if she had not been transferred overseas (1943–1962) with the Red Cross as recreational director. One of her early disciples was International Swimming Federation President, Dr. Hal W. Henning. She staged a production for the Armed Forces in the spectacular fountains and pools and gardens of the palace built by the Kings of the Two Sicilys and used as Allied headquarters in Caserta, Italy. When she finally returned home in 1962 after observing synchronized swimming all over Europe, her baby was a full-blown sport and has been a dominant American aquatic sport and art form ever since. Her pioneer book Rhythmic Swimming (1936) was a classic textbook on the sport she originated. Her no-nonsense ability to say it like it is made her not only the tough mother of synchronized swimming but led Bill Bachrach to call Kay Curtis "the only person I was ever jealous of in swimming".

== Childhood ==
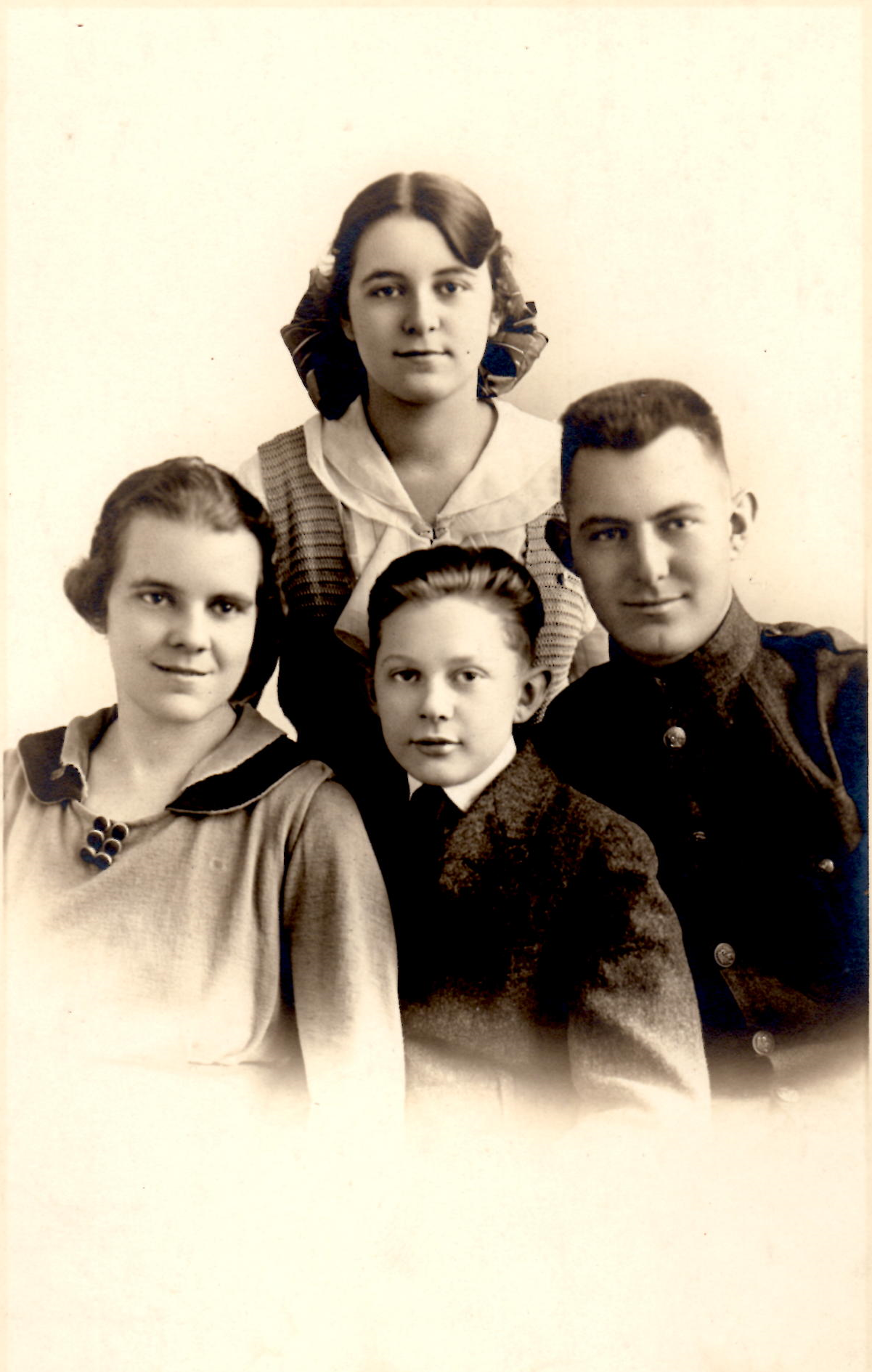
Whitney Children, c. 1917

Kay Curtis was born Katharine Townsend Whitney in Milwaukee, Wisconsin, on January 4, 1897. She was the daughter of Lee Rankin Whitney and Anne Townsend Whitney. Her father, Lee Whitney, was Chief Clerk of the Milwaukee branch of the Federal Bureau of Marine Inspection and Navigation. While Katharine and her siblings (two brothers and one sister) were still young their mother moved them to Delafield, Wisconsin, while their father remained in Milwaukee. When Katharine was of high school age, her mother moved the family to Madison, Wisconsin.

Katharine was an outstanding athlete during her high school years. On August 4, 1912, she swam across Lake Mendota, Wisconsin, a distance of three and one-half miles, in three hours and forty minutes, a remarkable accomplishment because she had to battle headwinds the entire distance. Three male swimmers who started with her were forced out before half the distance was accomplished. During the summer months of her high school career, Katharine was employed as a playground instructor by the Madison public schools.

== Education and early career ==
Katharine graduated from Madison's high school in June 1913 and entered the University of Wisconsin-Madison that fall. She attended college there until 1917, majoring in home economics and physical education, but did not take a degree. Between June and September 1917, she served as a swimming instructor at the University of Chicago. Her next job (September 1917 to June 1918) was as a physical education instructor at public schools in Tulsa, Oklahoma. Brief tenures of employment in physical education followed at Chico State Teachers College in Chico, California (the summer of 1918), the University of Chicago (August–September 1918), the Summit School for Girls in St. Paul, Minnesota (September 1918-June 1919), and again at the University of Chicago (the summer of 1919). Between September 1919 and June 1921, she taught physical education at The Principia, a private high school and college in St. Louis, Missouri. During this time, she also served as a coach at Camp Chocora in Tamworth, New Hampshire (the summer of 1920). The summer of 1921 found her as a swimming coach at Camp Minewonka at Three Lakes, Wisconsin.

Katharine returned to Chicago in September 1921, where she was employed in retail sales at the Moore Company until the following December, at which point she was hired by the Chicago Public Schools as an elementary-level physical education teacher, serving until June 1922. The summer of 1922 was spent coaching at Camp Minewonka. Katharine then enrolled at the University of Chicago in September 1923 to complete work on a Bachelor of Science degree, which she obtained on June 16, 1925. While working on her degree she was also employed by the U. of C. as a physical education instructor, and continued in that capacity until June 1927. Summer jobs as a swimming coach were held during this period at Camp Pinemere in Minocqua, Wisconsin (the summer of 1925), and at the University of Michigan in Ann Arbor (June 1926).

== Developing synchronized swimming ==
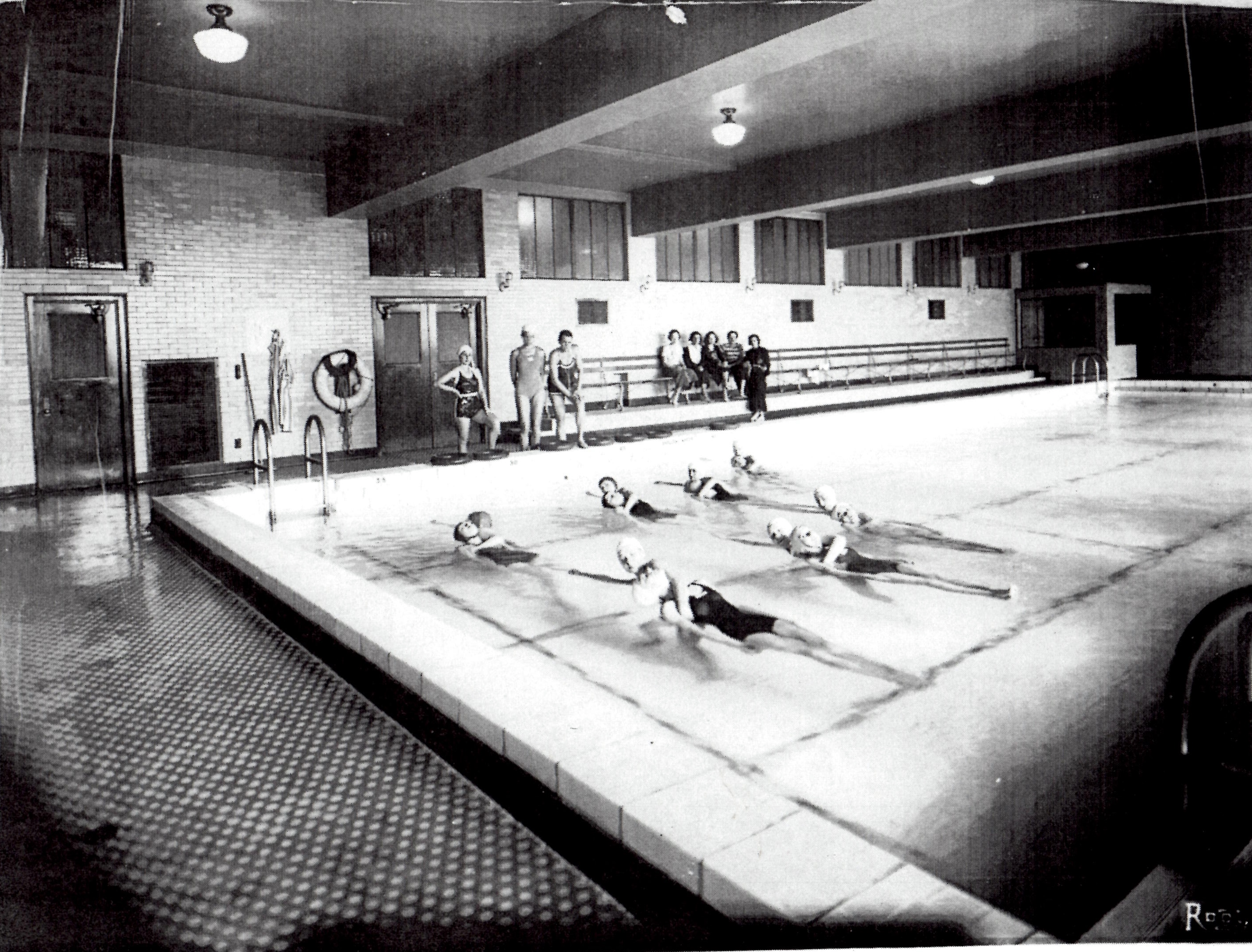
Swimming Class in Chicago, 1930s

Upon leaving the University of Chicago in June 1927, Katharine coached swimming at the University of Alabama at Tuscaloosa for a month. She then returned to Chicago that fall and began a fifteen-year career with the Chicago Public Schools, serving as a physical education instructor at the junior high and college levels. While on the faculty of Wright College in Chicago, she began developing a form of water pageantry that came to be known as synchronized swimming. She organized and trained the Kay Curtis Modern Mermaids, a swimming act of thirty girls who performed at the world's fair (Century of Progress International Exposition) in Chicago in 1933–1934. In 1936, she published a book on synchronized swimming, entitled Rhythmic Swimming (Minneapolis: Burgess Publishing Company). In January 1937, Katharine was divorced from George W. Curtis. No children resulted from the marriage. Katharine retained her husband's name for the remainder of her life. During these Chicago years, she also received a master's degree from DePaul University.

== World War II ==
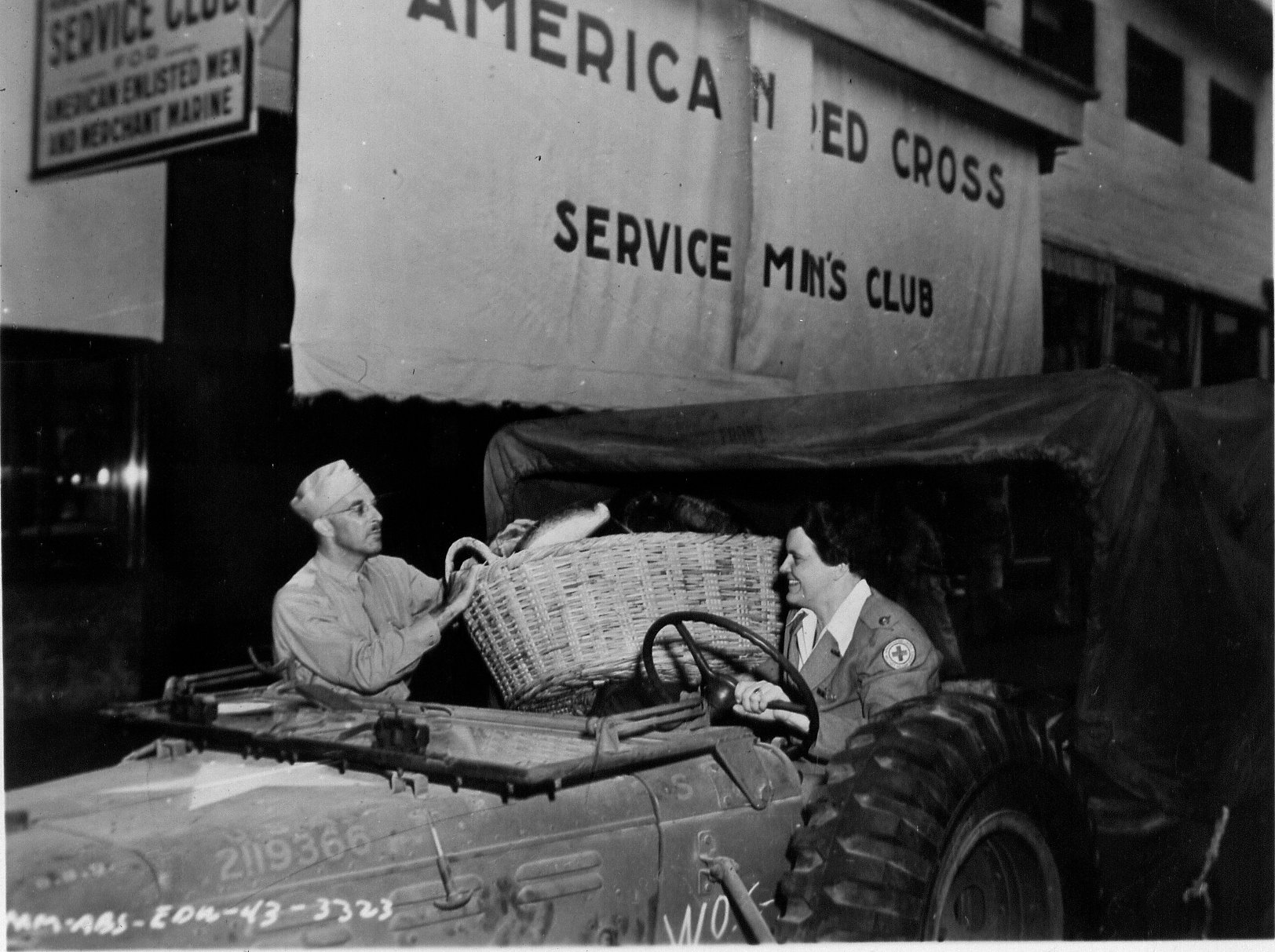
Curtis at Red Cross Club in Sicily, 1943

In May 1942, Curtis joined the American Red Cross. Her initial assignments were as Assistant Director of First Aid in Chicago (summer of 1942) and as a Club Director in Washington, D.C., until February 1943, when she was shipped to North Africa. She was stationed in Casablanca, Morocco, as a military recreations official before transferring to Sicily, Italy, in September 1943. Positions in Italy followed at Palermo (August–December 1943), at Capri (December 1943-May 1944), at San Spirito (May–August 1944), and at Caserta (November 1944-September 1945). While at Caserta, Curtis organized an "Aquacade", which was staged on June 16 and 17, 1945. As a Red Cross official, Curtis worked with military officers of all ranks, including General Patton and General Eisenhower.

Curtis was assigned to Marsailles, France, in October 1945 as Assistant Area Supervisor of Red Cross clubs, remaining there until early 1946. After returning briefly to Chicago's Wright College, the Red Cross requested that she serve in occupied Germany, and she arrived in Nurenburg in December 1946, where she supervised Red Cross service clubs in the area. The U.S. Army Special Services Unit assumed control of the service clubs in September 1947, and Curtis thereupon became Chief of the Leave Activities Section, Special Services, U.S. Army. Her duties included coordination between European bureaus of tourism, private travel agencies, and groups of U.S. armed forces personnel. Curtis became known as the "travel lady" to many servicemen and women as she assisted them with travel arrangements. Curtis remained with the Special Services Unit until September 1962, when she retired and settled in the Washington Island (Wisconsin) cottage which her mother had occupied for many years, named Ferda Lokin (which means "Journey's End).

== Later years ==
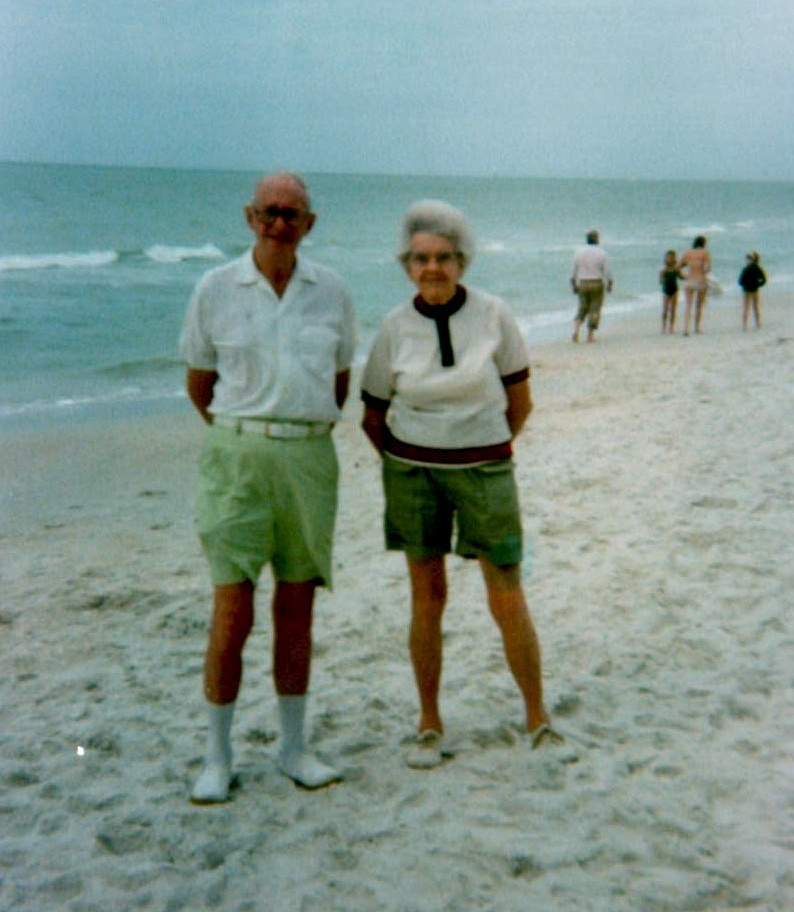
Kay Curtis & Brother in Naples, Florida

Curtis continued to travel extensively both in the U.S. and Europe and receiving awards for her pioneering career in synchronized swimming. In June 1959, she had become the first recipient of the Helms Synchronized Swimming Hall of Fame Award, and in May 1979, was inducted into the International Swimming Hall of Fame in Florida.

Even while "retired" on Washington Island, Curtis was busy, being called upon by various civic groups (arts councils, nature groups, Four-H Clubs) to assist or lead them in funding campaigns and building programs. In 1970 Curtis sold her Washington Island house, and moved to Florida in order to escape demands on her time, but did not care for the heat and humidity there. In July 1975, she returned to Washington Island, where she rented a house.

In the late 1970s, Curtis faced a recurrence of cancer, which she had first battled in the late 1960s. She died on July 6, 1980, in Wisconsin, and her ashes were scattered on Washington Island.
