= Jena Morrow =

American author and activist

- Education: North Central College
- Occupations: Writer, motivational speaker
- Known for: Books, eating disorders education
- Website: jenamorrow.blogspot.com

Jena Morrow is an American author and activist known for promoting education of eating disorders and body image issues. Morrow is further notable for combining eating disorder recognition with Christianity and for promoting the faith aspects of recovery.

== Literature ==
Morrow's first book Hollow: An Unpolished Tale was released April 21, 2010. In Hollow, she recounts her three-decade long battle with an eating disorder and her coping mechanisms. A central theme of the memoir is her positive relationship with Christianity in relation to her eating disorder and body image issues.

Her second book Hope for the Hollow: A Thirty-Day Inside-Out Makeover for Women Recovering from Eating Disorders was released three years later on June 28, 2013. Hope for the Hollow is a collection of thirty Christian devotionals used to battle eating disordered behaviors.

Morrow has also published two collections of Christian devotional poetry, titled Verses from a Yielded Vessel and Reflections of Grace.

She has been quoted at length in June Hunt's book How to Defeat Harmful Habits: Freedom from Six Addictive Behaviors. Hunt's book looks at overeating, alcohol and drug abuse, sexual addiction, codependency, anorexia, and bulimia and more from a Christian counseling perspective.

== In other media ==
Morrow also is a popular commentator on eating disordered topics, writing op-ed pieces for magazines and blogs and giving interviews on the radio.

She travels the United States speaking to groups about eating disorders and how detrimental they are in people's lives.

== Personal life ==
Morrow attended North Central College in Naperville, Illinois.
