= Hal Henning =

American swimming coach (1919–1988

Harold W. Henning Jr.
- Henning in Navy, early 1940s

Biographical details
- Born: January 30, 1919; Lockport, New York
- Died: May 23, 1988 (aged 69); Naperville, Illinois
- Education: North Central College; Loyola University Dental

Playing career
- 1937–1941: North Central College 1941
- Positions: freestyle, backstroke

Coaching career (HC unless noted)
- 1956, 1964: US Olympic Swim Team; Manager
- 1959–1965: U.S. Olympic Swim Committee Chair
- 1972–1976: President International Swimming Federation

Accomplishments and honors

Awards
- CSCAA 100 Greatest Coaches of the Century; 1979 International Swimming Hall of Fame

Harold W. "Hal" Henning Jr. (1919–1988) was an American dentist from Napierville Illinois, who was chair of the U.S. Olympic Swim Committee and then president of the International Swimming Federation, from 1972 through 1976. During his work with the swimming community in the 1970s, he lobbied to retain the number of swimming events in the Olympics, in 1973 reducing the total by 3 events, rather than the proposed 12. By preventing the loss of events, he helped retain media coverage time and gave a competitive advantage in Olympic competition to countries with strong, and balanced swim teams. Continuing his campaign to expand interest and coverage of swimming, he increased the number of seats for the swimming events at the 1976 Montreal Olympics, from 4400 to a total of 9000. As a member of the FINA bureau, and later Secretary and President, he helped to establish the first World Swimming Championship in Belgrade, Yugoslavia and the International Swimming Hall of Fame.

== Early swimming and coaching ==
Harold W. Henning was born in 1919, in Lockport, New York, to Harold Henning Sr and his wife. In high school, as an all-round athlete he participated in track, football and basketball, and excelled as a YMCA swimmer. Near the end of his high school years at the age of eighteen, he moved to Naperville, Illinois in 1937.

Graduating in 1941, he was a swimming All American specializing in freestyle and backstroke at Napierville's North Central College, though never an Olympian. As only a freshman at North Central in January 1938, he set a new conference record of 1:06.4 for the 100-yard backstroke, as well as winning the 50-yard freestyle and swimming on a winning medley relay team.

As a college senior at the March 1941 Illinois Conference Championships, he set records in both the 50-freestyle and 100-yard breaststroke events to lead North Central College to a first place in the team competition. Henning also swam for Chicago's Lake Shore Athletic Club, capturing two firsts and a second in short freestyle and backstroke events at the Midwest Swimming Meet in August 1939 in Moline, to tie as the meet's high scorer.

During his years in the military from October 1942 – 1945, he served as an instructor in Naval Aquatics Warfare. When his military service ended, he was instrumental in developing the education program for Red Cross swimming. At Red Cross, he worked with Katherine Whitney Curtis, a Red Cross physical education instructor and executive, the founder of synchronized swimming.

After his naval service he studied dentistry at Chicago's Loyola University, completing his degree in 1949. He then started a dental practice in Naperville, Illinois where he retained an association through his death in 1988.

=== Coaching ===
After college graduation and his 1941 marriage, he moved to Roseville, taught science and instructed sports at Roseville High School from 1941 to 1942. Greatly enhancing his knowledge of the sport of swimming, he coached the swim team at Monmouth College in his spare time, and later served 12 highly successful years volunteering as a coach for North Central College, his alma mater. At North Central, he led the school to 12 conference championships as well as 3 additional championships in the small college conference. While a coach he developed two Olympians, including 1960 Rome Olympic gold medalist Dick Blick, who would later teach and have a distinguished career as a High School swimming coach in California.

=== Swimming administrator ===
As a head of the American Amateur Athletic Union's Swimming Committee in the early 1960s, he pushed to start a Swimming Hall of Fame, and as a member of the FINA (The International Swimming Federation for International Competition) Bureau, gained support to recognize and sponsor the Hall by FINA. He served as the US Men's Olympic Swim Team manager for 1956, and later managed the U.S. Team at the Tokyo Olympics in 1964. Significantly, he was chairman of the U.S. Men's Olympic Swimming Committee from 1959 to 1965, and was first elected to the International Swimming Federation in 1964. After several years on the board, he served as president of the International Swimming Federation, from 1972 through 1976, a group that both protects and manages swimming, diving and water polo, throughout the world. This is the same organization known as FINA (Federation Internationale de Natation Amateur), for which he was both Secretary and became the first U.S-born President.

While acting as FINA Bureau member, Henning strongly lobbied for the idea of creating the vitally important FINA World Championship, to take place between the Olympics. Prior to Henning's acquiring the role of president of the International Swimming Federation from 1972 to 1976, the FINA Bureau agreed to hold its first World Championships in Belgrade, Yugoslavia. He served as an official at a number of Olympics, and at the Pan American Games.

Later in life, he chaired the Foreign relations committee of the U.S. Olympic Committee. From 1953 through 1959, he served as a member of the school board for the high schools and elementary schools in Naperville.

He died at Edward Hospital in Napierville, Illinois on May 23, 1988. Henning's wife Jean, who he married on September 6, 1941, was an author and a 1941 graduate of North Central College. She participated in diving, swimming and water ballet during her life. She helped establish the Harold W. Henning scholarship for pre-med or pre-dental students, and the Henning Library at the International Swimming Hall of Fame.

=== Honors ===
Henning was selected as one of the 100 Greatest Coaches of the Century by the College Swimming Coaches Association of America. For his advocacy of athletics and swimming, he received a Distinguished Alumni Award from his alma mater North Central College in November 1963. He was later admitted to the International Swimming Hall of Fame in 1979 as an Honor Contributor.
