= Duncan Scott =

Duncan Scott may refer to:

- Duncan Campbell Scott (1862–1947), Canadian bureaucrat, poet and prose writer
- Duncan Scott (comics) (died 2021), British comics artist
- Duncan Scott (director) (born 1947), American film and television director, writer, and producer
- Duncan Scott (swimmer) (born 1997), British swimmer
