= North Central College =

Private college in Naperville, Illinois, US

Coordinates: 41°46′32″N 88°8′34″W

- Former name: List: North Central: Plainfield College (1861–1864); North-Western College (1864–1926); Shimer: Mount Carroll Seminary (1852–1896); Frances Shimer Academy of the University of Chicago (1896–1907); Frances Shimer Junior College (1907–1950); Shimer College (1950–2017)
- Motto: Lux Veritas (Latin)
- Motto in English: "Light of Truth"
- Type: Private college
- Established: 1861; 165 years ago
- Accreditation: HLC
- Religious affiliation: United Methodist Church
- Endowment: $153.2 million (2025)
- President: Abiódún Gòkè-Pariolá
- Faculty: 139
- Students: 2,695
- Undergraduates: 2,304
- Postgraduates: 327
- Location: Naperville, Illinois, United States
- Campus: 69.4 acres (0.281 km^{2}); Midsize city
- Newspaper: The Chronicle
- Colors: (Cardinal red and white)
- Nickname: Cardinals
- Sporting affiliations: NCAA Division III – CCIW
- Mascot: Chippy the Cardinal
- Website: northcentralcollege.edu

North Central College is a private college in Naperville, Illinois, United States. It is affiliated with the United Methodist Church and has 73 undergraduate majors of study, 17 minors, 25 graduate programs, and 4 certificate programs offered by four undergraduate colleges/schools (College of Arts and Sciences, School of Business and Entrepreneurship, School of Education and Health Sciences, Shimer Great Books School) and one School of Graduate and Professional Studies.

== History ==
North Central College was founded in 1861 as "Plainfield College" in Plainfield, Illinois. Classes were first held on November 11 of that year. On February 15, 1864, the Board of Trustees changed the name of the school to "North-Western College". The college moved to Naperville in 1870 and the name was again changed in 1926 to North Central College.

In June 2017, North Central College acquired Shimer College and instituted the Shimer Great Books School of North Central College.

In October 2026, the college's Board of Trustees voted to adopt the name "North Central University Naperville," in an effort to reflect the breadth of programs offered and highlight its city. The change will go into effect on July 1st, 2027.

== Campus ==
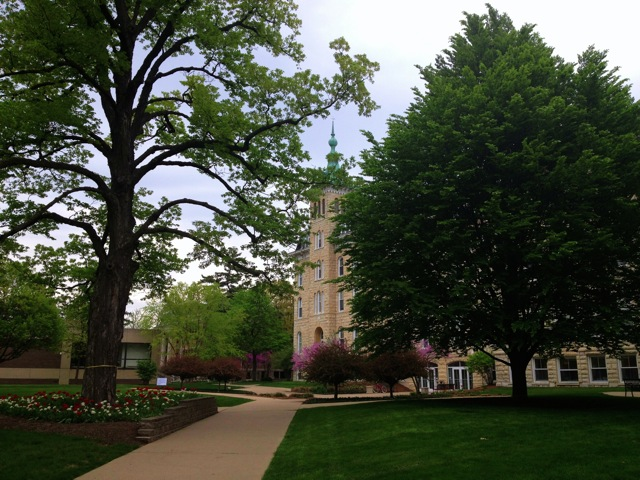
NCC Old Main in May 2013

The college is on a 65-acre (24 ha) campus 28 miles west of Chicago, in downtown Naperville. The campus sits just east of the DuPage River, between North and Prairie Avenues. Its eastern boundary is Loomis Street for most of the campus. Its western boundaries are Brainard Street for the portion north of Chicago Avenue and the DuPage River for the southern portion.

Old Main was completed in 1870 and remains the focal point of campus.

In the early 1900s, College President Herman J. Kiekhoefer and Judge John S. Goodwin initiated contact with philanthropist Andrew Carnegie to seek out funds for new facilities on campus. Carnegie agreed to donate $25,000 (approximately $679,059 in the current consumer price index) to then North-Western College for a new library building. Carnegie Library, as it was called, was one of only a few academic libraries in Illinois that received funding from Carnegie. The building still exists on campus and is now known as Carnegie Hall.

Pfeiffer Hall is North Central College's oldest fine arts building. The 4,500-square-foot building was built in 1926 and seats 1,057. This structure has been historically used by the college to screen films and host lectures, debates, and theatrical productions. Today Pfeiffer Hall continues to host events such as these along with live performances by popular music artists and comedians.

In 2008, North Central College dedicated the $30 million Wentz Concert Hall and Fine Arts Center. Designed by the Chicago architectural firm of Loebl Schlossman & Hackl, the 57,000-square-foot (5,300 m^{2}) facility was planned and sited with the needs of both the college and the Naperville community in mind. Plans evolved over a 15-year period, driven by explosive growth in the college's music, theatre and art programs, as well as the parallel transformation of the city's downtown, which has brought more than 50 restaurants, numerous national stores and the first four- and five-story buildings within a few blocks of the North Central campus.

The concert hall is named in honor of Myron Wentz, Class of 1963. Nearly $10 million in gifts from Wentz — a scientist, entrepreneur, and music lover — over the past two years have brought the facility to center stage. Plans for a new fine arts center were put on hold a decade ago when a devastating flood in Naperville forced the college to turn its attention to its damaged athletic complex instead.

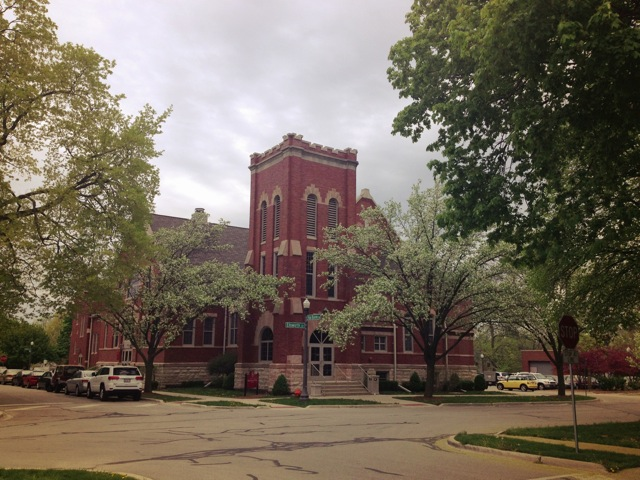
Meiley Swallow Hall

In addition to Wentz Concert Hall, the Fine Arts Center also features the Madden Theatre, which is a 150-seat “black box” experimental theatre that can double, as a dance studio and a facility to provide music rehearsal space, practice rooms and offices. The center also houses a spacious lobby, a kitchen facility and the Schoenherr Art Gallery (all supportive of major civic gatherings).

The rededication of Meiley-Swallow Hall, the old Grace Evangelical Church at Ellsworth Street and Van Buren Avenue, was a highlight during the 2007 Homecoming weekend. In 2005, the college embraced the opportunity to preserve a part of Naperville and North Central history by acquiring the former Grace Evangelical Church. The 95-year-old structure was erected by the same denomination that founded North Central College and an addition to the college's art and theatre programs. Special features of this building include nearly 23,000 square feet (2,100 m^{2}) of space, much-needed art display area, a 225-seat thrust stage theatre, and additional office space.

== Academics ==
North Central has all-college requirements, which include an intercultural seminar, a leadership, ethics, and values seminar, and a religion and ethics course, which are important components to the integrative curriculum. The college also has opportunities for individual work, such as the Richter Independent Study Grants and the Honors program's Senior Honors Thesis. Students are encouraged to study abroad, with opportunities on five continents from three-week courses to full-time term-long or full-year programs. Its most popular undergraduate majors, based on number out of 545 graduates in 2022, were:

- Psychology (64)
- Accounting (36)
- Marketing/Marketing Management (34)
- Business Administration, Management and Operations (27)
- Finance (27)
- Elementary Education and Teaching (25)
- Exercise Science and Kinesiology (23)

=== Rankings ===
North Central College garnered recognition as a top producer of Fulbright students for 2014–2015. The college is one of five schools in the world recognized with a 2015 Senator Paul Simon Award for Comprehensive Internationalization. In the 2007 through 2017 editions of the U.S. News & World Report "Best Colleges Rankings", North Central College is ranked in the top 20 Regional Universities (Midwest) as well as a "Best College for Veterans". Forbes magazine has rated North Central College among the top 20 percent of the nation's colleges and universities, through the 2010-2015 ranking editions.

=== Arts and media ===
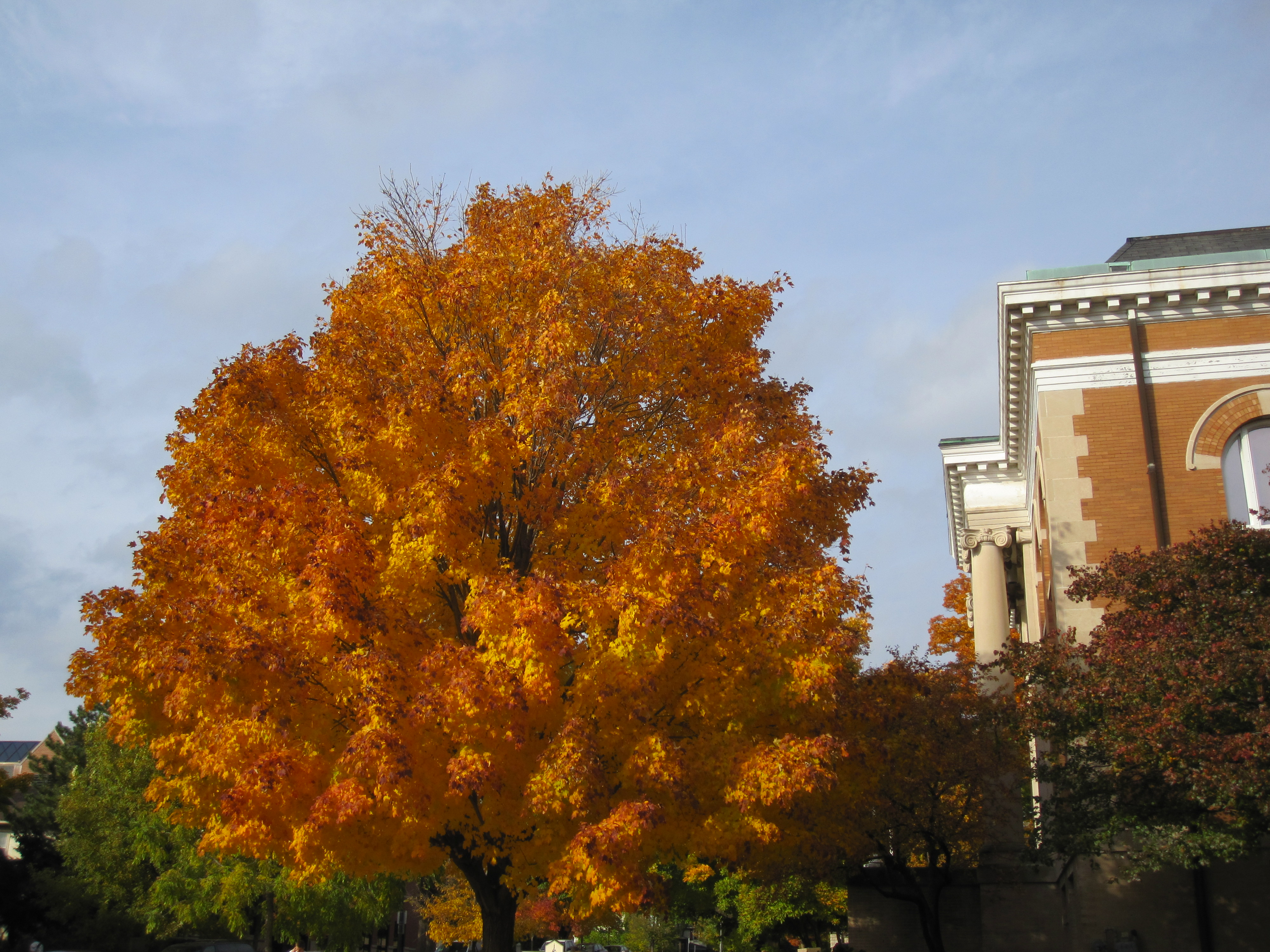
Carnegie Hall at NCC

North Central College offers majors like Music, Theatre, Musical Theatre and the most recently created, Theatrical Design and Technology. It has four theatre venues, Madden Theatre, Wentz Concert Hall, Meiley Swallow Hall and Pfeiffer Hall. Madden Theatre is a 150-seat, black box theater which hosts college performances and visiting guests, including concerts, cabaret-style revues, theater, film and dance performances.

Wentz Concert Hall has a capacity of 617 spectators, and is home to performances of classical, jazz and contemporary music. The acoustics in Wentz Concert Hall were designed by Talaske Sound Thinking, acoustical consultants for Chicago's critically acclaimed Pritzker Pavilion at Millennium Park. The venue also is ideally suited for recording. Wentz Concert Hall, which was created in honor of alumnus and donor Myron W. Wentz, has hosted a performers like cellist Yo-Yo Ma; Lyric Opera of Chicago soloist Elizabeth Futral; the Chicago Symphony Orchestra; jazz artists Herb Alpert, Chick Corea, Branford Marsalis, Herbie Hancock and Ramsey Lewis; and contemporary artists Béla Fleck and the Flecktones, Colbie Caillat, Los Lonely Boys and Dave Mason.

The hall is the west suburban home of the Chicago Sinfonietta, and the home of the DuPage Symphony Orchestra. It is an incomparable venue to showcase bands, orchestras and choirs of area high schools, as well as the college's multitude of musical ensembles and soloists. The Canadian quintet Canadian Brass, formed by Gene Watts and Charles Daellenbach, is a recurring guest at the hall.

The Pfeiffer Hall is the biggest theatre venue, with a capacity of 1,057 people and a large proscenium stage. When it opened, it was the largest theatre in the western suburbs of Chicago. Martin Luther King Jr., Robert Frost and Henry Kissinger, have been guest speakers. This hall also provides classrooms for the music and theatre programs, and faculty offices for North Central's speech communication department.

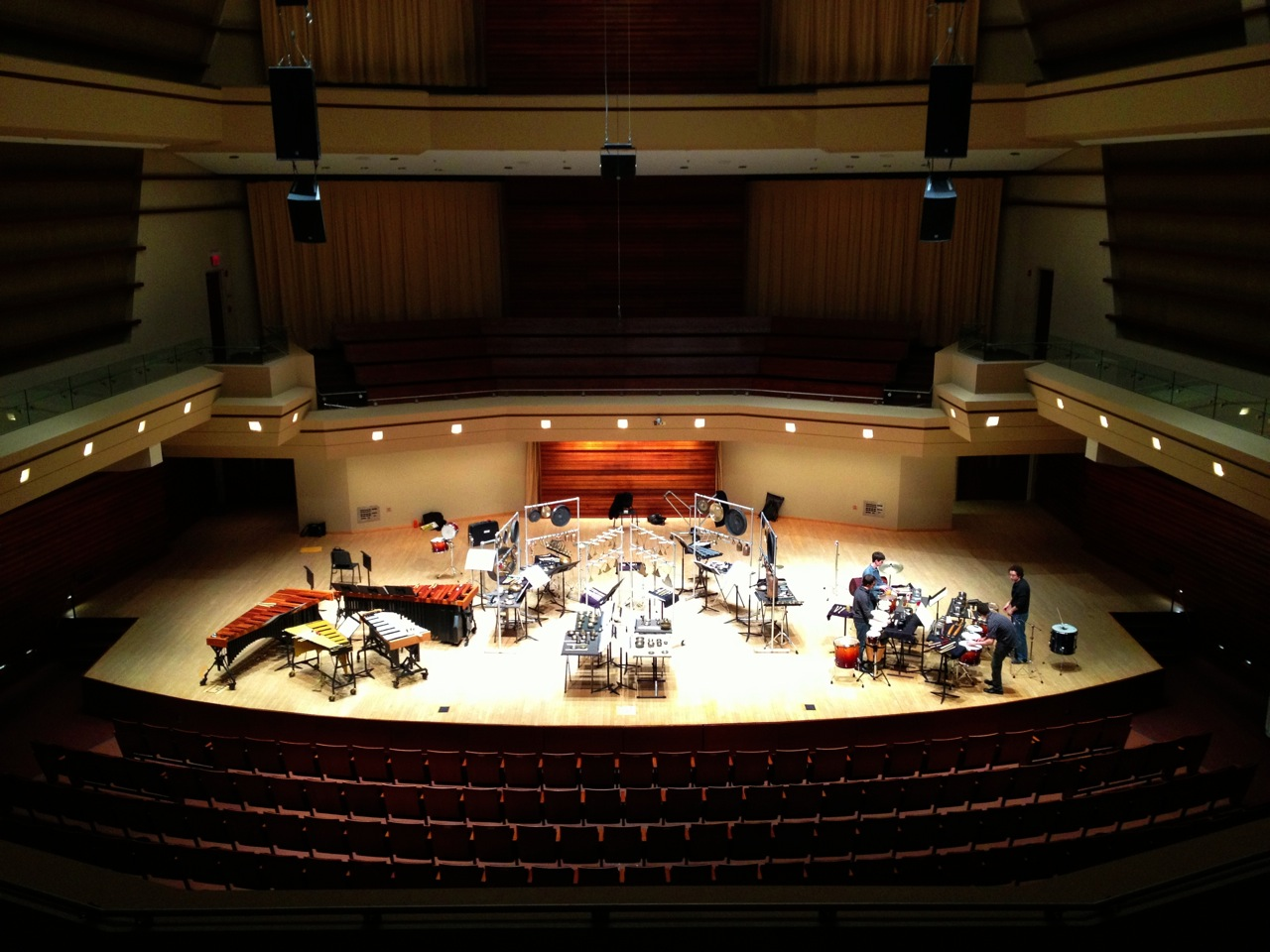
Third Coast Percussion rehearsing in Wentz Concert Hall on the campus of North Central College

The Meiley-Swallow Hall has a capacity of 239 people and is suitable for intimate theatre productions, panel discussions, presentations and speakers. The theatre is located inside Meiley-Swallow Hall, formerly Grace Evangelical Church and former Central Baptist Church, purchased by North Central College and renovated to house North Central College's fine arts performance, exhibit and curricular programs. It has a partnership with the Anderson's Bookshops in Naperville, and thanks to it, authors like Bill Bryson, Garth Stein and Antonio Sacre have been guest speakers.

The 2000 production of The Pirates of Penzance was selected to perform at Kennedy Center American College Theatre's Region III Festival. Productions of Ken Ludwig's Moon Over Buffalo and Schmidt and Jones' musical Philemon were both chosen to perform at the festival's "Evening of Scenes" in 2004 and 2005. The 2007 production of Thoroughly Modern Millie was selected as a regional finalist from more than 1,300 productions. The 2009 season featured a production of Cats, and in 2010, North Central became one of the first college theaters in the nation to stage a production of Andrew Lloyd Webber's The Phantom of the Opera.

=== Sciences ===
In 2016, the college launched their Brilliant Future campaign, which at the heart lie the construction of the college's new science center. Since the academic year 2014, the college has added new science majors including engineering, neuroscience and various health sciences. North Central's new science building opened in 2017 and was officially named the Dr. Myron Wentz Science Center in October 2017.

== Student life ==
=== Residential life ===
There are 12 residence halls at North Central College, eight of which are traditional while four are apartments and suites.

=== College radio station ===
North Central College is home to radio station WONC-FM 89.1. It is student-run, and is part of the Department of Communication and Media Studies. The station helps students pursue careers in both on-the-air and behind-the-scenes roles. It airs music and talk shows, traffic reports, coverage and broadcast of sports events, and public service announcements. In 1974, WONC received the Billboard Magazine Radio Station of the Year Award. In March 2015, it won the Best College Radio station award. No other college radio station has garnered more Marconi College Radio Awards than WONC. It was awarded the 2015 Intercollegiate Broadcasting System Abraham and Borst Best College Station in the Nation.

=== NCCLinked/The Chronicle ===
North Central's student-run campus news site, The Chronicle, regularly covers news about the college, student life, student athletics, and the surrounding Naperville community.

=== Athletics ===
NC athletics logo

North Central College's mascot is the Cardinal, in tradition of the bird's habitat in Illinois. The school competes in NCAA Division III and the College Conference of Illinois and Wisconsin (CCIW). It sponsors 22 sports and has won 30 team national championships, 26 NCAA and 4 NAIA. North Central athletes have won 115 individual national championships.

The total number of national championships puts the college at eighth on the all-time list for most national championships. North Central is the only school in the CCIW to win a national championship in four different sports. Since joining the CCIW, North Central has won 164 conference titles along with 14 CCIW postseason tournament titles.

== Notable alumni ==
- Dick Blick (swimmer) (Richard Adolph Blick) (born July 29, 1940), is an American former competitive swimmer, 1960 Olympic champion in the 4x200-meter freestyle relay, and former world record-holder. As of 1972, Blick remained the only North Central College athlete to ever win an Olympic gold medal.
- James Henry Breasted (1865–1935), American archaeologist and Egyptologist
- Hal Henning (1919–1988) North Central College swimmer, and then Associate North Central Swim Coach in the 1940s, he was Chair of the U.S. Olympic Swim Committee and then the first American president of the International Swimming Federation, from 1972 through 1976.
- P. J. Hyett (born 1983), software developer, and co-founder of GitHub
- Jena Morrow, author
- Joseph Edward Rall, endocrinologist and medical researcher
- Wayne Randazzo, Los Angeles Angels TV broadcaster
- Orrin Tucker, (1911–2011) musician and bandleader
- Paul A. Zahl (1910–1985), explorer and biologist and senior scientist to the National Geographic Society from 1958 to 1975
