= Javier Ostos Mora =

Lic. Javier Ostos Mora (August 15, 1916, in Mexico City, Mexico – November 5, 2008) was a former lawyer and sport politician from Mexico, most widely known for his work within the swimming community.

He was a permanent member of the Mexican Olympic Committee (Comité Olímpico Mexicano—COM), from 1941 through to his death; and served at various times as voice, first vice president and second vice president of COM.

He twice served as president of FINA, the International Swimming Federation: from 1968 to 1972 and 1976–1980; and in 1992 he was named FINA honorary life president. His presidency with FINA made him the first Mexican president of any international sport federation.

== Positions held ==
He was president of:

- FINA: 1968-'72, 1976-'80;
- the Amateur Swimming Union of the Americas (ASUA): 1968;
- CCCAN: 1955-'70, 1974-'78;
- the Mexican Swimming Federation (FMN: la Federación Mexicana de Natación): 1941, 1949-'51, 1955-'68, 1978-'80;

Honorary life member of: FINA, ASUA, and FMN.

Official/judge at the Summer Olympics in: London (1948), Rome (1960), Tokyo (1964), Mexico City (1968), Munich (1972), Montreal (1976), Moscow (1980), Los Angeles (1984), Seoul (1988), Barcelona (1992) and Atlanta (1996).
